= 2022 F1600 Championship Series =

12th season of the F1600 Championship Series

2022 F1600 season

Season
- Races: 21
- Start date: April 1
- End date: October 16

Awards
- Drivers' champion: (United States) Thomas Schrage
- Manufacturers' Cup: (France) Mygale

The 2022 F1600 Championship Series season was the eleventh season of the F1600 Championship Series. The season began on April 1 at Carolina Motorsports Park, and finished on October 17 at Pittsburgh International Race Complex.

Last year's champion, Nicholas d'Orlando of Team Pelfrey, moved up to the USF Juniors on the Road to Indy ladder. Thomas Schrage won the championship with Rice Race Prep. Schrage was chosen for the Team USA Scholarship.

== Drivers and teams ==
Pro Division
Team/Sponsor	No.	Drivers	Class	Rounds	Chassis	Engine
(United States) AntiSpeed	26	(United States) Charles Anti		7–9; 13–15	Van Diemen	Honda
(Canada) Britain West Motorsports	65	(Canada) Callum Baxter	R	1–3	Mygale	Honda
(United States) Chillout Motorsports	12	(United States) Porter Aiken		1–3	Spectrum	Honda
(United States) Chillout Motorsports	99	(United States) Porter Aiken		4–12	Piper	Honda
(Canada) Exclusive Autosport	92	(United States) Joey Brienza II		1–18	Spectrum	Honda
(Canada) Exclusive Autosport	93	(United States) Lindsay Brewer	R	7–9	Spectrum	Honda
(United States) Lavender Racing	96	(United States) Brandon Lavender	R	13–15; 19–21	Van Diemen	Honda
(United States) (Canada) Lee Racing w/ Rice Race Prep	3	(United States) Jonathan Lee		1–3	Swift	Honda
(United States) Lee Racing	3	(United States) Jonathan Lee		4–6; 10–12	Swift	Ford
(United States) Lee Racing	3	(United States) Jonathan Lee		16–18	Swift	Honda
(United States) Raceworks	70	(United States) Sam Lockwood	M	1–12; 19–21	Spectrum	Honda
(United States) Raceworks	70	(United States) Christopher Kierce		16–18	Spectrum	Honda
(Canada) Rice Race Prep	01	(United States) Thomas Schrage		All	Mygale	Honda
(Canada) Rice Race Prep	13	(United States) Gordon Scully	R	All	Mygale	Honda
(Canada) Rice Race Prep	18	(United States) Elliott Budzinski	R	13–15	Mygale	Honda
(Canada) Rice Race Prep	18	(United States) Anthony Cerciello	R	16–18	Mygale	Honda
(Canada) Rice Race Prep	32	(United States) Mateo Naranjo	R	19–21	Mygale	Honda
(Canada) Rice Race Prep	43	(United States) Will Holtz		1–9	Mygale	Honda
(United States) Sullivan Racing	19	(United States) Jack Sullivan	R	4–9; 13–15; 19–21	Piper	Honda
(United States) Team Pelfrey	80	(United States) Hugh Esterson		All	Mygale	Honda
(United States) Team Pelfrey	81	(United States) Nolan Allaer	R	All	Mygale	Honda
(United States) Team Pelfrey	82	(United States) Ayrton Houk		All	Mygale	Honda
(United States) Team Pelfrey	84	(United States) David Adorno		7–21	Mygale	Honda
(United States) Drivers Services	2	(United States) Mike Scanlan	M	10–21	Spectrum	Honda
(United States) Drivers Services	18	(United States) Gary Gecelter	R M	19–21	Spectrum	Honda
Dole Racing	4	(United States) John Dole	M	1–3	Spectrum	Honda
(United States) Auriana Racing	5	(United States) Joe Colasacco	M	1–3	Van Diemen	Honda
Dchultz	7	(United States) Timothy Steele	R	4–15; 19–21	Van Diemen	Honda
SteveSchultzBldr	71	(United States) Timothy Steele	R	1–3	Van Diemen	Honda
(United States) Steve Roux Racing	19	(United States) Steve Roux	M	16–18	Wyvern	Honda
Kelly-Moss Road & Race	8	(United States) Theodore Burns		19–21	Piper	Honda
Aero Metals	9	(United States) Robert Stowell	R M	4–15; 19–21	Spectrum	Honda
ATC Technologies Inc.	11	(United States) Christopher Kierce		1–6; 19–21	Van Diemen	Honda
Weiss	12	(United States) Bob Reid	M	4–6; 10–21	Citation	Honda
Shady Hill Clayworks	21	(United States) Dave Petzko	M	All	Spectrum	Honda
Steelfiber	24	(United States) Chris Horan		10–12; 19–21	Van Diemen	Honda
(United States) K-Hill Motorsports	27	(United States) Theo Peppes	M	10–12; 16–18	Mygale	Honda
Practical Precision Engineering	30	(United States) Will Velkoff		7–12; 16–21	Van Diemen	Honda
Morgan's Collision Center	31	(United States) Scott Rubenzer	M	1–6; 10–21	Spectrum	Honda
G-Force Motoersports	37	(United States) Garrett Dettman	G	1–3	Crossle	Honda
Home Tech Bldg. Consultants	41	(United States) Robert Albani	M	1–6; 10–12; 16–21	Mygale	Honda
Kingham Racing	47	(United States) Phil Kingham	R M	4–6; 10–15	Spectrum	Honda
Averill Racing Stuff	62	(United States) Robert Gross	G M	19–21	Piper	
Pit Lane Services	69	(United States) John Schimenti	R M	1–3	Spectrum	Honda
Bell Helmets / BP Motorsports	73	(United States) Robert Perona	M	1–9; 19–21	Piper	Honda
Messenger Racing	77	(United States) Jay Messenger	M	4–9	Van Diemen	Honda
ThermaMasters	85	(United States) David Livingston Jr.	M	4–12; 19–21	Spectrum	Honda
AdvAutomotive	93	(United States) Michael Bulzacchelli		4–6; 16–21	Piper	Honda

Icon	Class
M	Masters
R	Rookie
G	Guest

== Schedule ==
Rd.	Date	Track	Location
1	April 1–3	Carolina Motorsports Park	Kershaw, South Carolina
2	April 1–3	Carolina Motorsports Park	Kershaw, South Carolina
3	April 1–3	Carolina Motorsports Park	Kershaw, South Carolina
4	April 29–May 1	Mid-Ohio Sports Car Course	Lexington, Ohio
5	April 29–May 1	Mid-Ohio Sports Car Course	Lexington, Ohio
6	April 29–May 1	Mid-Ohio Sports Car Course	Lexington, Ohio
7	May 20–22	Barber Motorsports Park	Birmingham, Alabama
8	May 20–22	Barber Motorsports Park	Birmingham, Alabama
9	May 20–22	Barber Motorsports Park	Birmingham, Alabama
10	June 3–5	Pittsburgh International Race Complex	Wampum, Pennsylvania
11	June 3–5	Pittsburgh International Race Complex	Wampum, Pennsylvania
12	June 3–5	Pittsburgh International Race Complex	Wampum, Pennsylvania
13	July 8–10	Autobahn Country Club	Joliet, Illinois
14	July 8–10	Autobahn Country Club	Joliet, Illinois
15	July 8–10	Autobahn Country Club	Joliet, Illinois
16	August 19–21	Summit Point Motorsports Park	Summit Point, West Virginia
17	August 19–21	Summit Point Motorsports Park	Summit Point, West Virginia
18	August 19–21	Summit Point Motorsports Park	Summit Point, West Virginia
19	October 14–16	Pittsburgh International Race Complex	Wampum, Pennsylvania
20	October 14–16	Pittsburgh International Race Complex	Wampum, Pennsylvania
21	October 14–16	Pittsburgh International Race Complex	Wampum, Pennsylvania
References: Formula Race Promotions Set for Exciting 2022 Race Season

== Results & performance summaries ==
Round	Circuit	Location	Date	Pole position	Fastest lap	Winning driver
1	Carolina Motorsports Park	Kershaw, South Carolina	April 2	(United States) Thomas Schrage	(United States) Jonathan Lee	(United States) Ayrton Houk
2	Carolina Motorsports Park	Kershaw, South Carolina	April 3		(United States) Hugh Esterson	(United States) Thomas Schrage
3	Carolina Motorsports Park	Kershaw, South Carolina	April 3		(United States) Ayrton Houk	(United States) Thomas Schrage
4	Mid-Ohio Sports Car Course	Lexington, Ohio	April 30	(United States) Thomas Schrage	(United States) Ayrton Houk	(United States) Thomas Schrage
5	Mid-Ohio Sports Car Course	Lexington, Ohio	May 1		(United States) Nolan Allaer	(United States) Ayrton Houk
6	Mid-Ohio Sports Car Course	Lexington, Ohio	May 1		(United States) Nolan Allaer	(United States) Thomas Schrage
7	Barber Motorsports Park	Birmingham, Alabama	May 21	(United States) Hugh Esterson	(United States) Jack Sullivan	(United States) Hugh Esterson
8	Barber Motorsports Park	Birmingham, Alabama	May 22		(United States) Jack Sullivan	(United States) Ayrton Houk
9	Barber Motorsports Park	Birmingham, Alabama	May 22		(United States) Nolan Allaer	(United States) Jack Sullivan
10	Pittsburgh International Race Complex	Wampum, Pennsylvania	June 4	(United States) Hugh Esterson	(United States) Ayrton Houk	(United States) Hugh Esterson
11	Pittsburgh International Race Complex	Wampum, Pennsylvania	June 5		(United States) Thomas Schrage	(United States) Ayrton Houk
12	Pittsburgh International Race Complex	Wampum, Pennsylvania	June 5		(United States) Nolan Allaer	(United States) Nolan Allaer
13	Autobahn Country Club	Joliet, Illinois	July 9	(United States) Ayrton Houk	(United States) Jack Sullivan	(United States) Elliott Budzinksi
14	Autobahn Country Club	Joliet, Illinois	July 10		(United States) Ayrton Houk	(United States) Thomas Schrage
15	Autobahn Country Club	Joliet, Illinois	July 10		(United States) Jack Sullivan	(United States) Thomas Schrage
16	Summit Point Motorsports Park	Summit Point, West Virginia	August 20	(United States) Jonathan Lee	(United States) Ayrton Houk	(United States) Nolan Allaer
17	Summit Point Motorsports Park	Summit Point, West Virginia	August 21		(United States) Jonathan Lee	(United States) Hugh Esterson
18	Summit Point Motorsports Park	Summit Point, West Virginia	August 21		(United States) Ayrton Houk	(United States) Ayrton Houk
19	Pittsburgh International Race Complex	Wampum, Pennsylvania	October 15	(United States) Thomas Schrage	(United States) Thomas Schrage	(United States) Thomas Schrage
20	Pittsburgh International Race Complex	Wampum, Pennsylvania	October 16		(United States) Thomas Schrage	(United States) Thomas Schrage
21	Pittsburgh International Race Complex	Wampum, Pennsylvania	October 16		(United States) Thomas Schrage	(United States) Thomas Schrage

Team Performance Summary
Team	Wins	Poles	Podiums	Fast Laps
(Canada) Rice Race Prep	10	3	21	4
(United States) Team Pelfrey	10	3	32	11
(United States) Sullivan Racing	1	0	2	4
(Canada) Exclusive Autosport	0	0	3	0
(United States) Lee Racing	0	1	3	2

Driver Performance Summary
Driver	Wins	Poles	Podiums	Fast Laps
(United States) Thomas Schrage	9	3	16	4
(United States) Ayrton Houk	5	1	11	6
(United States) Hugh Esterson	3	2	12	1
(United States) Nolan Allaer	2	0	9	4
(United States) Elliott Budzinski	1	0	3	0
(United States) Jack Sullivan	1	0	2	4
(United States) Joey Brienza II	0	0	3	0
(United States) Robert Perona	0	0	2	0
(United States) Will Holtz	0	0	2	0
(United States) Jonathan Lee	0	1	3	2

Chassis Performance Summary
Team	Wins	Poles	Podiums	Fast Laps
(France) Mygale	20	6	53	15
(United States) Piper	1	0	4	4
(Australia) Spectrum	0	0	3	0
(United States) Swift	0	1	3	2

== Scoring System ==
Points are awarded to the top twentyfive classified drivers, and the top drivers who enables to achieve the Pole Position or the Fastest Lap during the qualify session are awarded with the corrispective bonus points +3 and +2 points.

The Season Championship will recognize only driver’s best 18 of 21 race results including all bonus points earned.

Points are awarded using the following system:

Position	1st	2nd	3rd	4th	5th	6th	7th	8th	9th	10th	11th	12th	13th	14th	15th	16th	17th	18th	19th	20th	21st	22nd	23rd	24th	25th+	DNF
Points	50	42	37	34	31	29	27	25	23	21	19	17	15	13	11	10	9	8	7	6	5	4	3	2	1	1

Guest drivers are ineligible to score points.

== Driver Standings ==
Pos	Driver	CMP			MO			BAR			PITT-1			ABCC			SP			PITT-2			Pts	Drop Pts
1	(United States) Thomas Schrage	**DNF**	1	1	**1**	2	1	15	2	2	2	5	2	2	1	1	5 (Note: 01 found in Violation of 1.6.17.5: SAFE PASS - Loss of 15 pts.) (Note: 01, found in Violation of 1.6.17.3: AVOIDABLE CONTACT - Loss of 10 pts.)	7	2	**1**	1	1	**839**	818
2	(United States) Ayrton Houk	1	2	2	3	1	13	4	1	5	10	1	3	**7**	3	16	17	2	1	9	4	4	**740**	704
3	(United States) Hugh Esterson	DNF (Note: 80 found in violation. 1.6.17.3 Avoidable Contact. Penalty: Loss of 15 Race points.)	3	14	4	6	2	**1**	3	3	**1**	2	16	4	9	3	4	1	18	2	2	3	**682**	678
4	(United States) Nolan Allaer	2	19	4	DNF	9	6	3	4 (Note: 43 & 81 are both found to be in violation of 1.6.17.4: RACING ROOM & 1.6.17.3: AVOIDABLE CONTACT - 81 Loss of 15 Race Points & Purse.)	7	3	4	1	6	4	5	1	3	12	3	3	2	**672**	647
5	(United States) Joey Brienza II	3	5	5	7	5	8	2	15	4	7	19	6	5	6	4	2	4	6				531	531
6	(United States) Jonathan Lee	18	8	10	9	12	21				12	3	4				**3**	4	3	5	6	5	390	390
7	(United States) Gordon Scully	9	10	8	10	8	18	DNF	9	17	19	8	8	10	8	7	18	7	16	10	9	7	**402**	386
8	(United States) Scott Rubenzer	7	12	12	11	13	9				11	14	9	11	11	9	6	8	8	12	12	9	370	370
9	(United States) Jack Sullivan				5	7	7	6	10	1				3	15	14				8	7	6	335	335
10	(United States) Porter Aiken	6	7	11	8	4	5	7	5	12 (Note: 99 found in violation of 1.6.17.3: AVOIDABLE CONTACT - Loss of 15 Race Points.)	4	6	5										319	319
11	(United States) Robert Perona	4	4	3	6	10	3	8	6 (Note: 73 found in violation of 1.6.17.5: SAFE PASS & 1.6.17.3: AVOIDABLE CONTACT - Loss of 10 Race Points & Purse.)	6										4	DNF	DNS	300	300
12	(United States) Timothy Steele	11	13	9	13	15	20	10	11	13	5	DNF	DNS	DNF	5	15				7	DNF	11	266	266
13	(United States) Bob Reid				14	11	12				9	11	18	12	12	10	11	13	10	13	15	14	248	248
14	(United States) David Adorno							12	14	8	DNS	20	20	8	10	8	7	9	5	21	11	22	247	247
15	(United States) Robert Albani	8 (Note: 41 found in violation. 1.6.17.3 Avoidable Contact. Penalty: Loss of 15 Race points and Purse.)	11	13	21	DNF	DNS				8	9	7				10	16	4	DNF	13	10	227	227
16	(United States) Dave Petzko	14	17	17	18	19	17	18	18	15	17	17	11	16	DNF	13	19	19	14	23	21	18	**188**	179
17	(United States) David Livingston Jr.				12	16	10	9	7	18 (Note: 85 found in violation of 1.6.17.3: AVOIDABLE CONTACT - Loss of 15 Race Points.)	14	10	14							22	14	13	**170**	177
18	(United States) Will Velkoff							16	16	DNF	15	13	10				12	12	13	16	16	17	146	146
19	(United States) Mike Scanlan										18	15	15	14	13	11	13	15	9	18	20	20	146	146
20	(United States) Will Holtz	17 (Note: 43 found in violation. 1.6.17.5 Safe Pass. Penalty: Loss of 15 Race points.)	DNS	DNS	2	3	4	5	DNF	DNF													**140**	146
21	(United States) Christopher Kierce	16	20	20	15	14	11										16	11	11	14	17	16	145	145
22	(United States) Sam Lockwood	13	15	19	17	18	15	17	17	14	16	16	12							19	23	23	142	142
23	(United States) Charles Anti							11	13	9				9	7	6							136	136
24	(United States) Elliott Budzinksi													1	2	2							134	134
25	(United States) Chris Horan										6	7	21							25	5	8	118	118
26	(United States) Robert Stowell				20	DNF	19	19	19	16	20	18	13	17	16	DNF				20	18	24	103	103
27	(United States) Michael Bulzacchelli				19	DNF	16										9	14	7	17	19	DNF	98	98
28	(Canada) Callum Baxter	5	6	7																			87	87
29	(United States) Jay Messenger				16	17	14	14	12	11													81	81
30	(United States) Theo Peppes										13	12	19				14	10	DNF				74	74
31	(United States) Theodore Burns																			6	8	15	65	65
32	(United States) Lindsay Brewer							13	8	10													61	61
33	(United States) Mateo Naranjo																			11	10	12	57	57
34	(United States) Phil Kingham				DNS	Wth	Wth				21	DNF	17	15	14	12							56	56
35	(United States) Joe Colasacco	DNF	9	6																			53	53
36	(United States) Anthony Cerciello																8	17	15				45	45
37	(United States) John Dole	10	16	15																			42	42
38	(United States) Brandon Lavender													13	DNS	DNS				15	22	19	37	37
39	(United States) Steve Roux																15	18	17				28	28
40	(United States) John Schimenti	15	18	18																			27	27
41	(United States) Gary Gecelter																			24	24	21	9	9
Drivers ineligible for points
	(United States) Garrett Dettman	12	14	16																				
	(United States) Robert Gross																			DNS	Wth	Wth		
Pos	Driver	CMP			MO			BAR			PITT-1			ABCC			SP			PITT-2			Pts	Drop Pts
References: FRP Official Points Standings & Results Archive F1600 & Race Monitor

Color	Result
Gold	Winner
Silver	2nd-place finish
Bronze	3rd-place finish
Green	Top 5 finish
Light Blue	Top 10 finish
Dark Blue	Other flagged position
Purple	Did not finish (DNF)
Brown	Withdrew (Wth)
Black	Disqualified (DSQ)
White	Did Not Start (DNS)
White	Race abandoned (C)
Blank	Did not participate

**In-line notation**
**Bold**	Pole position (3 points)
Italics	Fastest lap of the race (2 points)

Master of the Year
Masters

== Incident Reports ==
CMP 2022 - F1600 R1 Penalty Report
Mid-Ohio 2022 - F1600 Penalty Report
Barber 2022 - F1600 Penalty Report
PIRC-1 2022 - F1600 Penalty Report
Summit Point 2022 - F1600 Penalty/Incident Report

== See also ==
- 2022 F2000 Championship Series
