= Nolan Allaer =

American racing driver (born 2002)

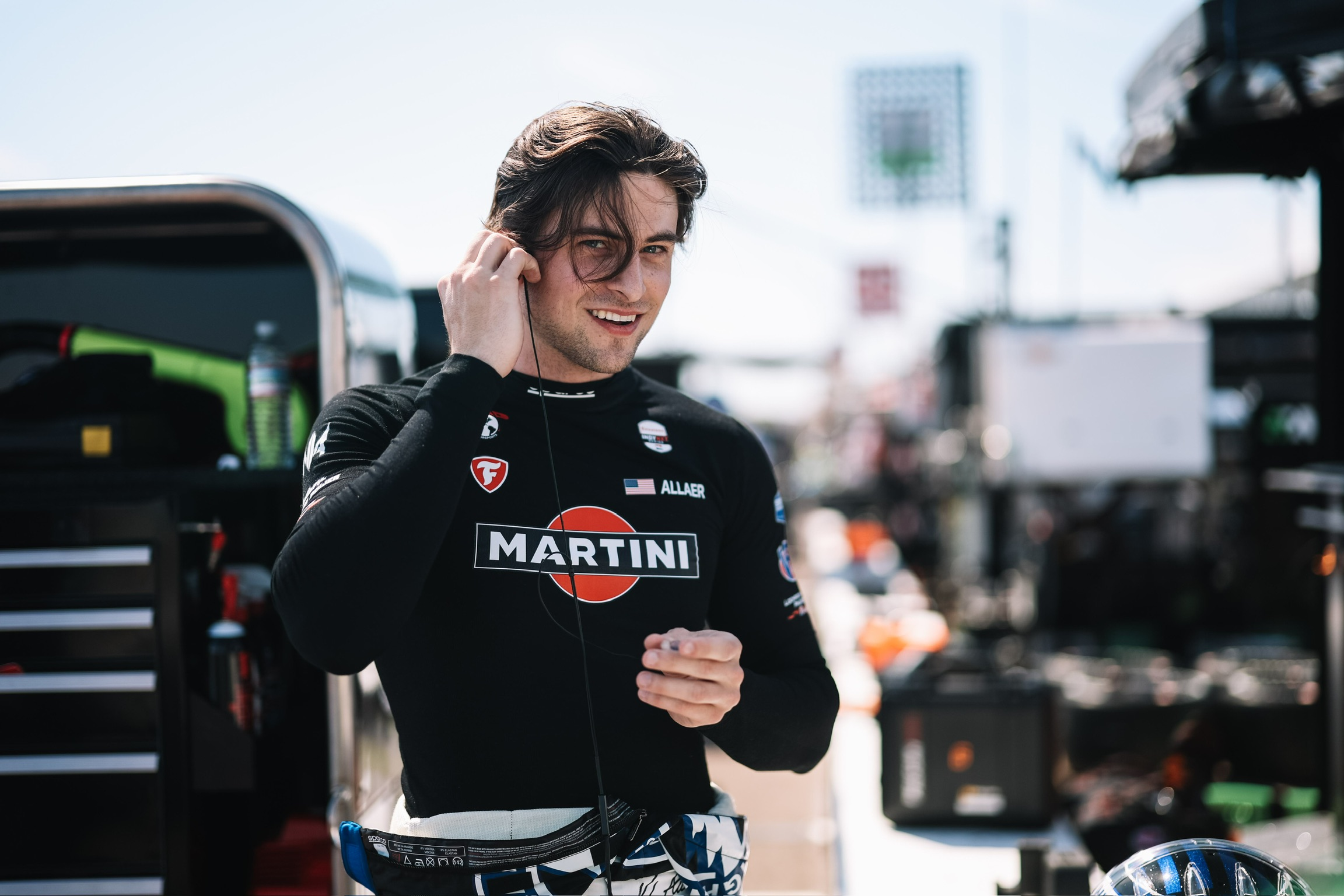
- Allaer in 2024
- Born: March 5, 2002 (age 24); Detroit, Michigan, U.S.

Indy NXT career
- Debut season: 2024
- Current team: HMD Motorsports
- Car number: 11
- Starts: 23
- Championships: 0
- Wins: 0
- Podiums: 0
- Poles: 0
- Fastest laps: 0
- Best finish: 16th in 2025

Nolan Allaer (born March 5, 2002) is an American racing driver who is currently competing in Indy NXT driving the No. 76 car for Juncos Hollinger Racing. He has previously driven for Abel Motorsports.

== Career ==
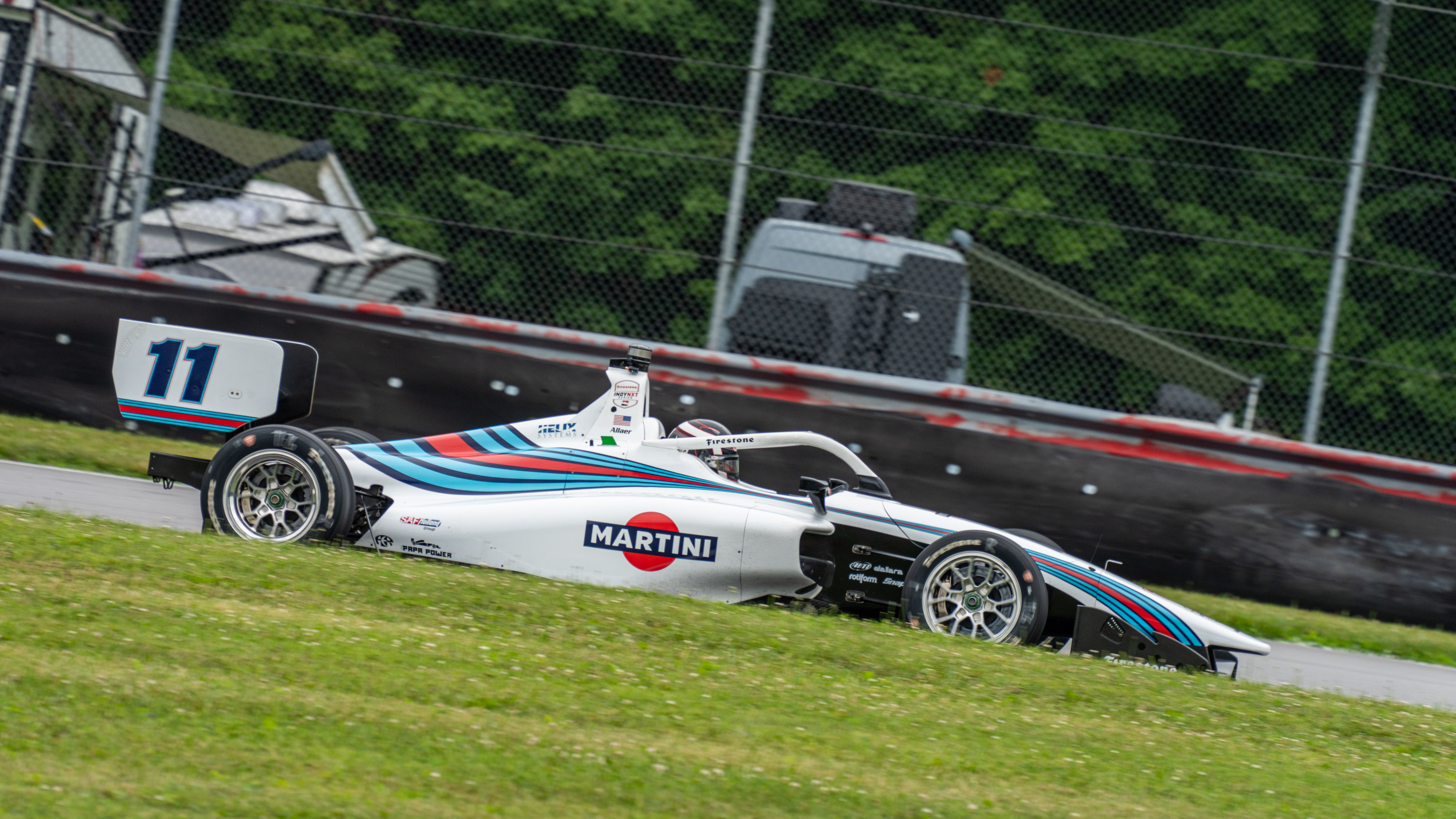
Allaer's 2024 Indy NXT car at Mid-Ohio Sports Car Course

Allaer started racing at age six, and in 2008, was competing in the Florida Karting Championship Series. His first race in the SCCA National Championship Runoffs garnered him a third place finish in the Formula Continental class. The following year at the SCCA Runoffs, he won the Formula Continental class over Simon Sikes, current USF2000 Championship, and finished third in Formula F. Allaer joined Team Pelfrey in 2022 to compete in the F1600 Championship Series earning two wins and nine podiums.

In 2023, Allaer returned to the SCCA Runoffs and won the Formula Continental for the second time, with his father, Robert finishing second. Additionally that weekend at the Runoffs, he won the Formula F championship winning with a Ford for the first time since 2011.

In 2024, it was announced that Allaer would be moving up to the Indy NXT series. He would end up 19th in the Drivers' Championship, missing Iowa, WWTR, Portland and Milwaukee.

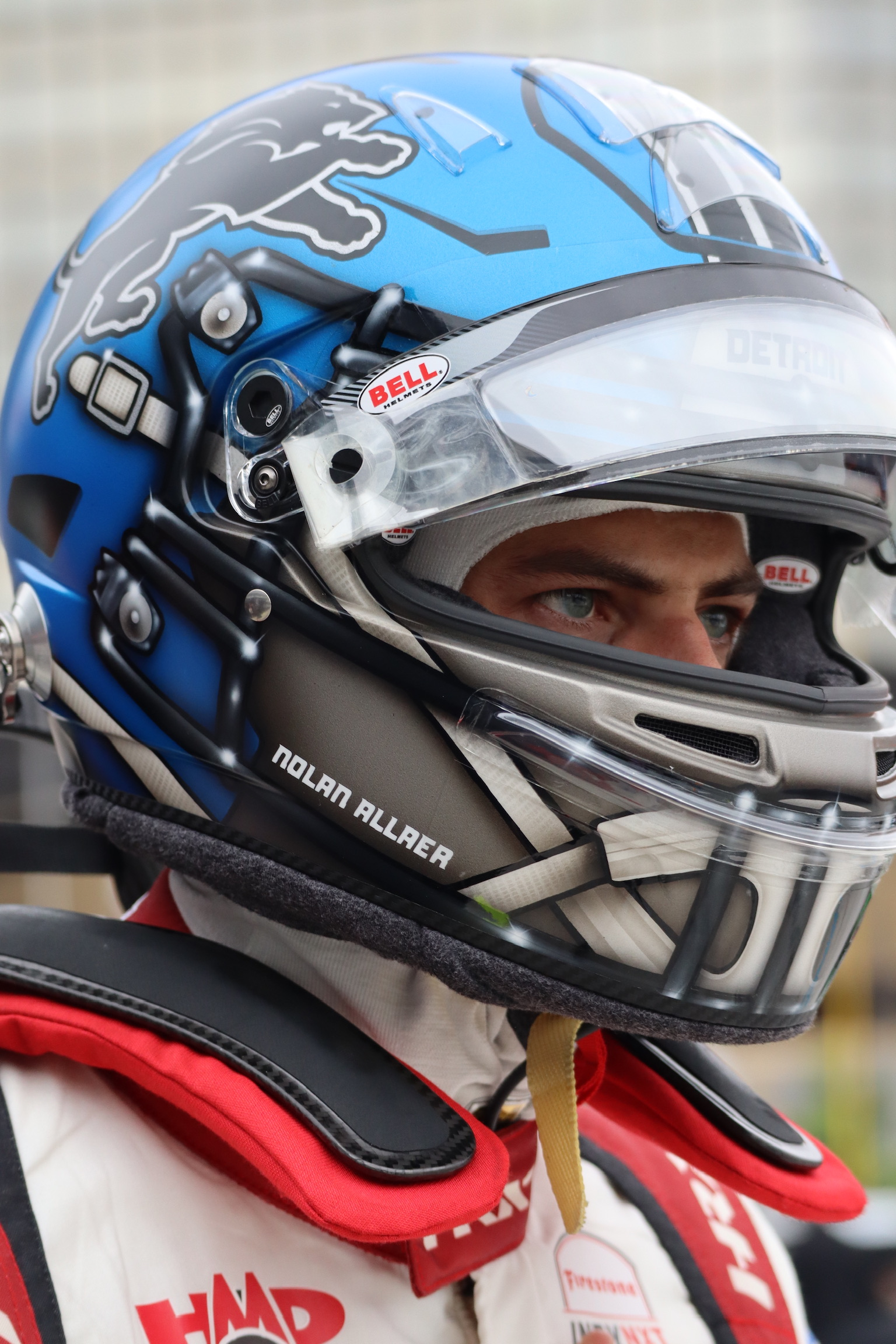
Allaer in his 2024 Indy NXT racesuit and helmet.

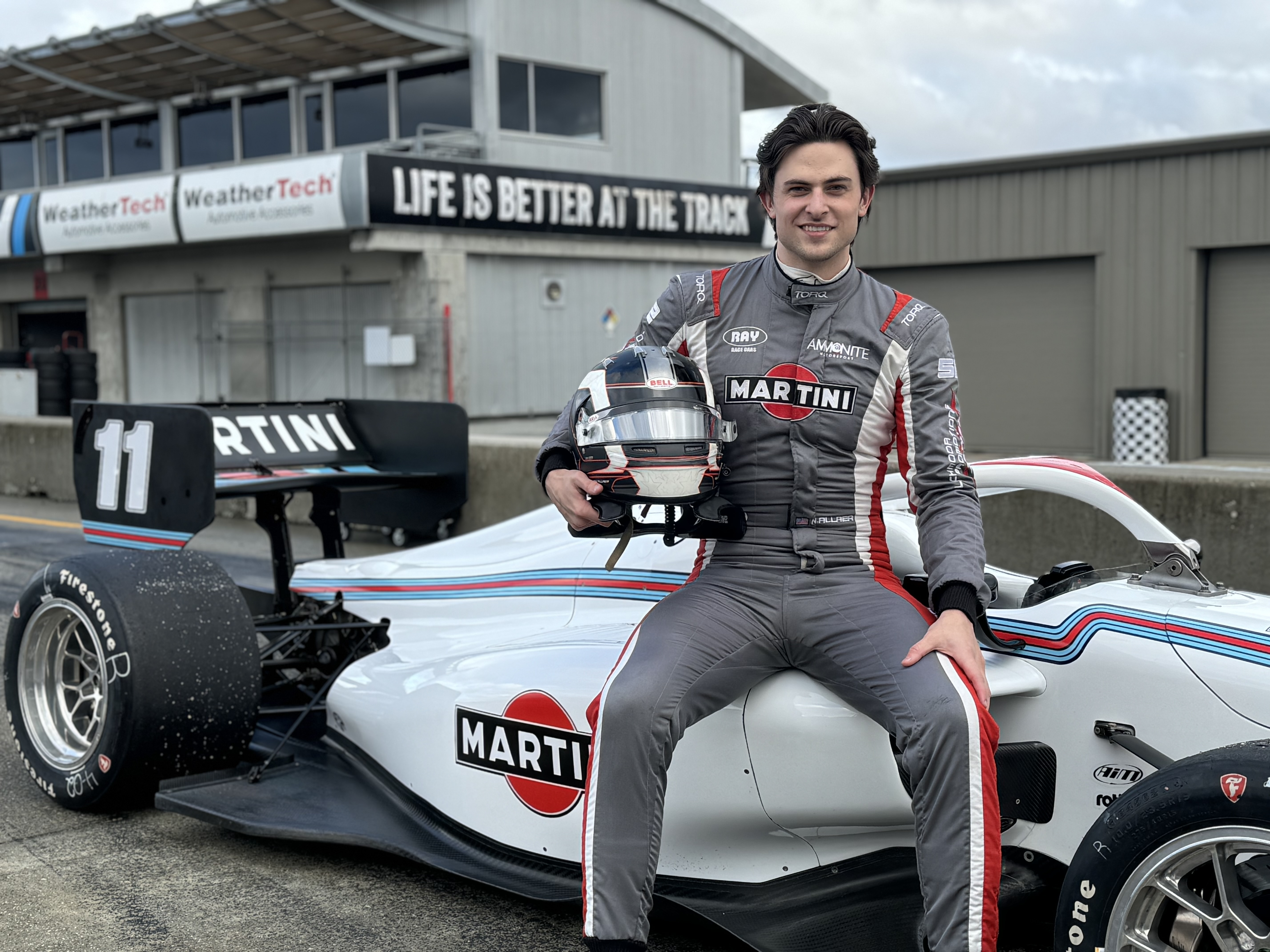
Allaer by his Martini-sponsored Indy NXT car at Laguna Seca.

Allar would stay with HMD Motorsports for his second Indy NXT campaign, driving full-time and only missing the Milwaukee race. He placed three places higher in the points in 16th.

At the start of 2026, Allaer would race in the Formula Regional Oceania Trophy with Giles Motorsport.

After no full-time campaign in 2026, Allar would join Indy NXT half way through the season, sharing the No. 76 Juncos Hollinger Racing car with Ricardo Escotto for the last seven rounds, who would do a partial FIA Formula 3 campaign. He would be backed by Faygo Beverages.

== Personal life ==
Allaer attends Miami University. His father, Robert, is a two-time SCCA National Championship Runoffs champion in the Formula Continental and his uncle, J. Lewis Cooper III, is a former SCCA National champion in Formula F. Allaer currently lives in Downtown Detroit, being the only known race car driver to live in Detroit City Limits.

== Racing record ==
=== Racing career summary ===
Season	Series	Team	Races	Wins	Poles	F/Laps	Podiums	Points	Position
2020	SCCA Great Lakes Division – Formula Continental	LTD Motorsports	4	2	0	0	4	92	**2nd**
2020	SCCA Great Lakes Division – Formula Ford	LTD Motorsports	2	0	0	0	2	37	8th
2021	SCCA National Championship Runoffs – Formula Continental	Martini/Chandon/LTD Motorsport	1	0	0	0	1	N/A	**3rd**
2022	F1600 Championship Series	Team Pelfrey	21	2	0	4	9	647	4th
2022	SCCA National Championship Runoffs – Formula Continental	LTD Motorsports	1	1	1	1	1	N/A	**1st**
2022	SCCA National Championship Runoffs – Formula F		1	0	0	0	1	N/A	**3rd**
2023	BRSCC National Formula Ford Championship	Ammonite Motorsport	16	0	0	0	0	78	6th
2023	Formula Ford Festival	Ammonite Motorsport	1	0	0	0	0	N/A	16th
2023	SCCA National Championship Runoffs – Formula Continental		1	1	1	1	1	N/A	**1st**
2023	SCCA National Championship Runoffs – Formula F		1	1	1	0	1	N/A	**1st**
2024	Indy NXT	HMD Motorsports	10	0	0	0	0	158	19th
2025	Indy NXT	HMD Motorsports	13	0	0	0	0	192	16th
2026	Formula Regional Oceania Trophy	Giles Motorsport	15	0	0	0	0	133	12th
2026	IMSA Ford Mustang Challenge	Spark Performance	4	0	0	0	0	980	10th
2026	Indy NXT	Juncos Hollinger Racing	5	0	0	0	0	67	26th
2026	GT4 America Series - Pro-Am	McCumbee McAleer Racing	8	0	0	0	2	60	11st

=== American open–wheel racing results ===
==== SCCA National Championship Runoffs ====
Year	Track	Car	Engine	Class	Finish	Start	Status
2021	Indianapolis	Van Diemen RF02	Ford	Formula Continental	3	3	Running
2022	VIR	Van Diemen RF02	Ford	Formula Continental	1	1	Running
2022	VIR	Van Diemen RF00	Ford	Formula F	3	4	Running
2023	VIR	Van Diemen RF02	Ford	Formula Continental	1	1	Running
2023	VIR	Van Diemen RF00	Ford	Formula F	1	1	Running

==== F1600 Championship Series ====
Year	Team	1	2	3	4	5	6	7	8	9	10	11	12	13	14	15	16	17	18	19	20	21	Rank	Points
2022	Team Pelfrey	CMP; 2	CMP; 19	CMP; 4	MO; 22	MO; 9	MO; 6	BAR; 3	BAR; 4	BAR; 7	PITT; 3	PITT; 4	PITT; 1	ABCC; 6	ABCC; 4	ABCC; 5	SP; 1	SP; 3	SP; 12	PITT; 3	PITT; 3	PITT; 2	**4th**	**647**

==== Indy NXT ====
(key) (Races in bold indicate pole position) (Races in italics indicate fastest lap) (Races with ^{L} indicate a race lap led) (Races with * indicate most race laps led)

Year	Team	1	2	3	4	5	6	7	8	9	10	11	12	13	14	15	Rank	Points
2024	HMD Motorsports	STP; 14	BAR; 18	IMS; 13	IMS; 17	DET; 17	RDA; 10	LAG; 20	LAG; 14	MOH; 8	IOW	GMP	POR	MIL	NSH; 13		19th	158
2025	HMD Motorsports	STP; 19	BAR; 20	IMS; 16	IMS; 20	DET; 15	GMP; 9	RDA; 16	MOH; 16	IOW; 19	LAG; 9	LAG; 14	POR; 15	MIL	NSH; 12		16th	192
2026	Juncos Hollinger Racing	BAR	BAR	IMS	IMS	DET	GAT	ROA	ROA	MOH; 24	MOH; 18	NSS	POR; 11	MIL	LAG; 9	LAG; 22	26th	67

* Season still in progress.

=== Complete Formula Regional Oceania Trophy results ===
(key) (Races in bold indicate pole position) (Races in italics indicate fastest lap)

Year	Team	1	2	3	4	5	6	7	8	9	10	11	12	13	14	15	16	DC	Points
2026	Giles Motorsport	HMP; 1; 14	HMP; 2; 9	HMP; 3; 10	HMP; 4; 7	TAU; 1; 12	TAU; 2; 13	TAU; 3; 9	TAU; 4; 8	TER; 1; 15†	TER; 2; 13	TER; 3 C	TER; 4; 12	HIG; 1; 15	HIG; 2; 10	HIG; 3; 11	HIG; 4; 15	12th	133
