= Joey Brienza =

American racing driver (born 2004)

- Nationality: (United States) American
- Born: Joey Brienza II; September 9, 2004 (age 22) Denver, Colorado, United States

USF Pro 2000 Championship career
- Debut season: 2025
- Current team: Exclusive Autosport
- Car number: 91
- Starts: 0
- Wins: 0
- Podiums: 0
- Poles: 0
- Fastest laps: 0

Previous series
- 2022–24 2023 2021–22: USF2000 Championship; USF Juniors; F1600 Championship Series

Joey Brienza II (born September 9, 2004) is an American racing driver who competes in the USF Pro 2000 Championship driving for Exclusive Autosport. He previously competed in the 2024 USF2000 Championship driving for Exclusive Autosport.

== Career ==
=== F1600 Championship Series ===
==== 2021 ====
On February 23, 2021, it was announced that Brienza would make his open-wheel racing debut in the 2021 F1600 Championship Series driving for Exclusive Autosport. He would get his first win in the series in the second race at Pittsburgh International Race Complex. He would have a successful season with one pole, one fastest lap, three wins, and nine podiums to finish third in the championship.

==== 2022 ====
Brienza would return to the series for the 2022 season once again driving for Exclusive Autosport. He would not contest the final three races at Pittsburgh International Race Complex. Brienza would have less success in his second season, finished fifth in the standings.

=== USF Juniors ===
On November 10, 2022, it was announced that Brienza would compete in the 2023 USF Juniors driving for Exclusive Autosport. At the opening round in Sebring International Raceway, he would qualify on pole for all three races by over half a second. In the first two races, Brienza would finish second to Quinn Armstrong and Nicolas Giaffone respectively. In the third race, Brienza was able to convert his pole to a win. He would go on to finish fifth in the championship.

=== USF2000 Championship ===
==== 2022 ====
Along with his full season campaign in the 2022 F1600 Championship Series, Brienza would compete in three races in the 2022 USF2000 Championship with Exclusive Autosport, at Indianapolis Motor Speedway, Road America, and Portland International Raceway.

==== 2023 ====
Brienza would return to the series in 2023 for more select starts with Exclusive Autosport. He would score a best finish of tenth at the opening race in St. Petersburg.

==== 2024 ====
In 2024, Brienza would make a full-season effort with Exclusive Autosport. He would qualify on pole at the first race at NOLA Motorsports Park, but ultimately finished third in the race. Brienza finished 5th in the championship.

=== USF Pro 2000 Championship ===
==== 2025 ====
For 2025, Brienza would move up to the USF Pro 2000 Championship with Exclusive Autosport for the full season.

==== 2026 ====
Brienza remained in the USF Pro 2000 Championship with Exclusive Autosport in 2026.

== Racing record ==
=== Career summary ===
Season	Series	Team	Races	Wins	Poles	F/Laps	Podiums	Points	Position
2021	F1600 Championship Series	Exclusive Autosport	24	3	1	1	9	703	**3rd**
2022	USF2000 Championship	Exclusive Autosport	3	0	0	0	0	23	27th
2022	F1600 Championship Series	Exclusive Autosport	18	0	0	0	3	531	5th
2023	USF Juniors	Exclusive Autosport	16	1	3	1	6	280	5th
2023	USF2000 Championship	Exclusive Autosport	5	0	0	0	0	38	24th
2024	USF2000 Championship	Exclusive Autosport	18	0	1	0	4	265	5th
2025	USF Pro 2000 Championship	Exclusive Autosport	18	0	0	0	0	182	11th
2026	USF Pro 2000 Championship	Exclusive Autosport	18	0	0	0	0	182	12th

* Season still in progress.

=== American open-wheel racing results ===
==== F1600 Championship Series ====
(key) (Races in bold indicate pole position) (Races in italics indicate fastest lap)

Year	Team	1	2	3	4	5	6	7	8	9	10	11	12	13	14	15	16	17	18	19	20	21	22	23	24	Rank	Points
2021	Exclusive Autosport	CMP; 1; 11	CMP; 2; 6	CMP; 3; 2	MOH; 1; 9	MOH; 2 DNF	MOH; 3; 9	ALA; 1; 14	ALA; 2; 4	ALA; 3; 2	PIR1; 1; 8	PIR1; 2; 1	**PIR1**; **3** DNF	ROA; 1; 1	ROA; 2; 4	ROA; 3; 18	SPM; 1; 1	SPM; 2; 3	SPM; 3; 2	ACC; 1; 5	ACC; 1; 5	ACC; 1; 16	PIR2; 1; 2	PIR2; 2; 4	PIR2; 3; 2	3rd	703
2022	Exclusive Autosport	CMP; 1; 3	CMP; 2; 5	CMP; 3; 5	MOH; 1; 7	MOH; 2; 5	MOH; 3; 8	ALA; 1; 2	ALA; 2; 15	ALA; 3; 4	PIR1; 1; 7	PIR1; 2; 19	PIR1; 3; 6	ACC; 1; 5	ACC; 2; 6	ACC; 3; 4	SPM; 1; 2	SPM; 2; 4	SPM; 3; 6	PIR2; 1	PIR2; 1	PIR2; 1				5th	531

==== USF Juniors ====
(key) (Races in bold indicate pole position) (Races in italics indicate fastest lap) (Races with * indicate most race laps led)

Year	Team	1	2	3	4	5	6	7	8	9	10	11	12	13	14	15	16	Rank	Points
2023	Exclusive Autosport	**SEB**; **1**; 2	**SEB**; **2**; 2*	**SEB**; **3**; 1*	ALA; 1; 4	ALA; 2; 6	VIR; 1; 14	VIR; 2; 2	VIR; 3; 5	MOH; 1; 6	MOH; 2; 13	ROA; 1; 3	ROA; 2; 9	ROA; 3; 9	COA; 1; 18	COA; 2; 3	COA; 3; 5	5th	280

==== USF2000 Championship ====
(key) (Races in bold indicate pole position) (Races in italics indicate fastest lap) (Races with * indicate most race laps led)

Year	Team	1	2	3	4	5	6	7	8	9	10	11	12	13	14	15	16	17	18	Rank	Points
2022	Exclusive Autosport	STP; 1	STP; 2	ALA; 1	ALA; 2	IMS; 1 DNS	IMS; 2; 12	IMS; 3 DNS	IRP	ROA; 1 DNS	ROA; 2; 18	MOH; 1	MOH; 2	MOH; 3	TOR; 1	TOR; 2	POR; 1 DNS	POR; 2 DNS	POR; 3; 10	27th	23
2023	Exclusive Autosport	STP; 1; 10	STP; 2; 16	SEB; 1	SEB; 2	IMS; 1	IMS; 2	IMS; 3	IRP; 14	ROA; 1	ROA; 2	MOH; 1	MOH; 2	MOH; 3	TOR; 1; 18	TOR; 2; 12	POR; 1	POR; 2	POR; 3	24th	37
2024	Exclusive Autosport	STP; 1; 10	STP; 2; 8	**NOL**; **1**; 3	NOL; 2; 5	NOL; 3; 5	IMS; 1; 2	IMS; 2; 22	IRP; 9	ROA; 1; 2	ROA; 2; 3	MOH; 1; 9	MOH; 2; 6	MOH; 3; 5	TOR; 1; 10	TOR; 2; 8	POR; 1; 12	POR; 2; 10	POR; 3; 5	5th	265

* Season still in progress.

==== USF Pro 2000 Championship ====
(key) (Races in bold indicate pole position) (Races in italics indicate fastest lap)

Year	Team	1	2	3	4	5	6	7	8	9	10	11	12	13	14	15	16	17	18	Rank	Points
2025	Exclusive Autosport	STP; 1; 13	STP; 2; 11	LOU; 1; 8	LOU; 2; 12	LOU; 3; 16	IMS; 1; 11	IMS; 2; 8	IMS; 3; 10	IRP; 18	ROA; 1; 6	ROA; 2; 10	ROA; 3; 12	MOH; 1; 7	MOH; 2; 14	TOR; 1; 7	TOR; 2; 16	POR; 1; 10	POR; 2; 10	11th	182
2026	Exclusive Autosport	ARL; 1; 10	ARL; 2; 22	IMS; 1; 11	IMS; 2; 17	IRP; 18	ROA; 1; 9	ROA; 2; 9	MOH; 1; 11	MOH; 2; 13	MOH; 3; 8	POR; 1; 7	POR; 2; 9	MAR; 1; 9	MAR; 2; 10	MIL; 14	ROA; 1; 8	ROA; 2; 10	ROA; 3; 10	12th	182

* Season still in progress.
