= Nicholas d'Orlando =

American racing driver

- Nationality: (United States) American
- Born: April 9, 2003 (age 23) Hartsdale, New York, United States
- Relatives: Michael d'Orlando (brother)

USF2000 Championship career
- Debut season: 2022
- Current team: Exclusive Autosport
- Car number: 92
- Starts: 12
- Wins: 0
- Podiums: 0
- Poles: 0
- Fastest laps: 1
- Best finish: 20th in 2022

Previous series
- 2022 2022 2021: USF Juniors; YACademy Winter Series; F1600 Championship Series

Championship titles
- 2021: F1600 Championship Series

Nicholas d'Orlando (born April 9, 2003) is an American racing driver who competed in the 2024 Radical Cup North America driving for Graham Rahal Performance. He previously competed in the 2023 USF2000 Championship driving for Exclusive Autosport. d'Orlando is the 2021 F1600 Championship Series champion. In 2024, Radical Indianapolis announced the addition of d’Orlando to the team in Sebring.

== Racing career ==
=== F1600 Championship Series ===
Due to budgetary issues, d'Orlando did not race in 2019 and 2020. In 2021, he made his car racing debut in the F1600 Championship Series driving for Team Pelfrey. He would take his maiden pole at the first race of the season at Carolina Motorsports Park, but ultimately retired at lap 14. He would immediately take his maiden win in the second race of the season. d'Orlando would go onto have a dominant season winning 12 out of 24 races and taking 18 podiums. He would finish 176 points ahead of the nearest competitor.

=== USF Juniors ===
On February 9, 2022, it was announced that d'Orlando would compete in the inaugural USF Juniors season in 2022 driving for DC Autosport with Cape Motorsports. Due to a lack of budget, he would not compete in the Virginia International Raceway round. However, he did not return for the rest of the season, instead opting to race in the USF2000 Championship.

=== USF2000 Championship ===
==== 2022 ====
d'Orlando would move up to the USF2000 Championship in 2022 debuting for Velocity Racing Development at the Road America round. He would finish in the top-10 in his first race after qualifying in 18th and would get fastest lap. d'Orlando would switch to Exclusive Autosport mid-season for the Toronto round.

==== 2023 ====
D'Orlando faced budget issues once again for the 2023 season. As a result, he would return to the series only for the first round at St. Petersburg, sticking with Exclusive Autosport.

2024

Radical Indianapolis added d'Orlando to their team in Sebring.

== Personal life ==
d'Orlando's older brother Michael d'Orlando is also a racing driver.

== Racing record ==
=== Career summary ===
Season	Series	Team	Races	Wins	Poles	F/Laps	Podiums	Points	Position
2021	F1600 Championship Series	Team Pelfrey	24	12	6	12	18	901	**1st**
2022	YACademy Winter Series	Cape Motorsports	6	0	0	0	0	39	6th
2022	USF Juniors	DC Autosport w/Cape Motorsports	5	0	0	0	0	39	22nd
2022	USF2000 Championship	Velocity Racing Development	5	0	0	1	0	77	20th
2022	USF2000 Championship	Exclusive Autosport	5	0	0	0	0	77	20th
2023	USF2000 Championship	Exclusive Autosport	2	0	0	0	0	23	26th

* Season still in progress.

=== American open-wheel racing results ===
==== F1600 Championship Series ====
(key) (Races in bold indicate pole position) (Races in italics indicate fastest lap)

Year	Team	1	2	3	4	5	6	7	8	9	10	11	12	13	14	15	16	17	18	19	20	21	22	23	24	Rank	Points
2021	Team Pelfrey	**CMP**; **1**; 13	CMP; 2; 1	CMP; 3; 1	MOH; 1; 3	MOH; 2; 2	MOH; 3; 2	ALA; 1 DNF	ALA; 2; 1	ALA; 3; 1	PIR1; 1; 1	**PIR1**; **2**; 26	PIR1; 3; 1	**ROA**; **1**; 3	ROA; 2; 5	ROA; 3; 1	SPM; 1 DNF	SPM; 2; 1	SPM; 3; 1	**ACC**; **1**; 1	**ACC**; **1**; 2	ACC; 1; 3	**PIR2**; **1**; 1	**PIR2**; **2**; 1	**PIR2**; **3** DNF	1st	901

==== USF Juniors ====
(key) (Races in bold indicate pole position) (Races in italics indicate fastest lap) (Races with * indicate most race laps led)

Year	Team	1	2	3	4	5	6	7	8	9	10	11	12	13	14	15	16	17	Rank	Points
2022	DC Autosport with Cape Motorsports	OIR; 1 DNS	OIR; 2; 11	OIR; 3 C†	ALA; 1; 8	ALA; 2; 6	VIR; 1	VIR; 2	VIR; 3	MOH; 1	MOH; 2	MOH; 3	ROA; 1	ROA; 2	ROA; 3	COA; 1	COA; 2	COA; 3	22nd	39

† Race was cancelled due to inclement weather.

==== USF2000 Championship ====
(key) (Races in bold indicate pole position) (Races in italics indicate fastest lap) (Races with * indicate most race laps led)

Year	Team	1	2	3	4	5	6	7	8	9	10	11	12	13	14	15	16	17	18	Rank	Points
2022	Velocity Racing Development	STP; 1	STP; 2	ALA; 1	ALA; 2	IMS; 1	IMS; 2	IMS; 3	IRP	ROA; 1; 10	ROA; 2; 13	MOH; 1; 15	MOH; 2; 8	MOH; 3; 20						20th	77
2022	Exclusive Autosport														TOR; 1; 9	TOR; 2; 12	POR; 1; 19	POR; 2; 19	POR; 3; 9	20th	77
2023	Exclusive Autosport	STP; 1; 6	STP; 2; 13	SEB; 1	SEB; 1	IMS; 1	IMS; 2	IMS; 3	IRP	ROA; 1	ROA; 2	MOH; 1	MOH; 2	MOH; 3	TOR; 1	TOR; 2	POR; 1	POR; 2	POR; 3	26th	23

* Season still in progress.
