= 2021 F1600 Championship Series =

11th season of the F1600 Championship Series

2021 F1600 season

Season
- Races: 24
- Start date: April 1
- End date: October 17

Awards
- Drivers' champion: (United States) Nicholas d'Orlando
- Manufacturers' Cup: (France) Mygale

The 2021 F1600 Championship Series season is the eleventh season of the F1600 Championship Series. The season commences on April 1 at Carolina Motorsports Park, and ends on October 17 at Pittsburgh International Race Complex.

Last year's champion, Simon Sikes, moved up to the U.S. F2000 National Championship on the Road to Indy ladder.

The season was won by Nicholas d'Orlando who won twelve out of the twenty-four races for Team Pelfrey.

== Drivers and teams ==
Pro Division
Team/Sponsor	No.	Drivers	Class	Rounds	Chassis	Engine
(United States) Auriana Racing	3	(United States) Joe Colasacco	M	4–6, 10–12	Van Diemen	Honda
(United States) Brad Hayes Racing	75	(United States) Ayrton Houk	R	4–6, 19–21	Piper	Honda
(Canada) Exclusive Autosport	92	(United States) Joey Brienza II	R	All	Spectrum	Honda
(Canada) Exclusive Autosport	93	(New Zealand) Billy Frazer	R	4–6	Spectrum	Honda
(United States) Drivers Services	2	(United States) Mike Scanlan	M	1–6, 10–24	Spectrum	Honda
(United States) Global Racing Team	51	(United States) TJ Zimmerman	R	4–15	Van Diemen	Mazda
(United States) K-Hill Motorsports	08	(United States) Jace Denmark	G	13–15	Mygale	Honda
(United States) K-Hill Motorsports	11	(Estonia) Tonis Kasemets	M	19–21	Mygale	Honda
(United States) K-Hill Motorsports	27	(United States) Theo Peppes	M	16–18, 22–24	Mygale	Honda
(United States) K-Hill Motorsports	27	(Republic of Ireland) Peter Dempsey		19–21	Mygale	Honda
(United States) K-Hill Motorsports	76	(United States) Ax Kametches		All	Mygale	Honda
(United States) K-Hill Motorsports	90	(United States) Omar Khan		4–15	Mygale	Honda
(United States) Lee Racing	0	(United States) Jonathan Lee		1–12	Swift	Ford
(United States) Lee Racing	05	(United States) Jonathan Lee		13–15	Swift	Ford
(United States) (Canada) Lee Racing w/ Rice Race Prep	0	(United States) Jonathan Lee		16–24	Swift	Ford
(United States) Pure Energy Racing	33	(United States) Jeffrey Bartz		4–9, 13–15, 19–21	Van Diemen	Honda
(United States) Raceworks	70	(United States) Sam Lockwood	M	1–12, 16–18, 22–24	Spectrum	Honda
(Canada) Rice Race Prep	01	(United States) Thomas Schrage		19–24	Mygale	Honda
(Canada) Rice Race Prep	6	(United States) Simon Sikes		4–6	Mygale	Honda
(Canada) Rice Race Prep	6	(United States) Dexter Czuba		7–9	Mygale	Honda
(Canada) Rice Race Prep	6	(United States) Thomas Schrage		10–12	Mygale	Honda
(Canada) Rice Race Prep	6	(Canada) Misha Goikhberg		13–15	Mygale	Honda
(Canada) Rice Race Prep	6	(United States) Andre Castro	R	16–18	Mygale	Honda
(Canada) Rice Race Prep	13	(United States) Kyle August		All	Mygale	Honda
(Canada) Rice Race Prep	43	(United States) Will Holtz		All	Mygale	Honda
(Canada) Rice Race Prep	52	(United States) Robert Perona	M	1–3	Mygale	Honda
(United States) Steve Roux Racing	19	(United States) Steve Roux	M	1–3	Wyvern	Honda
(United States) Team Pelfrey	80	(United States) Hugh Esterson		All	Mygale	Honda
(United States) Team Pelfrey	81	(United States) Nicholas d'Orlando	R	All	Mygale	Honda
(United States) Team Pelfrey	84	(United States) David Adorno		4–24	Mygale	Honda
(United States) TR Racing	32	(United States) Trevor Russell		4–6		Ford
(United States) Two Dogg Racing	88	(United States) Tim Kautz	M	13–15	Piper	Honda
AirportElectricServ	01	(United States) Thomas Schrage		4–6	Swift	
Dole Racing	4	(United States) John Dole	M	10–12, 16–18, 22–24	Spectrum	Honda
Aero Services Winchester	5	(United States) Steve Oseth	M	10–12, 16–18	Citation	Honda
Aero Services Winchester	72	(United States) Steve Oseth	M	22–24	Citation	Honda
ATC Technologies Inc.	11	(United States) Christopher Kierce		16–18, 22–24	Spectrum	Honda
Weiss	12	(United States) Bob Reid	M	1–6, 10–18, 22–24	Citation	Honda
Polestar	18	(United States) Robert Dietz		4–6	Van Diemen	Honda
Kelly-Moss Road & Race	18	(United States) Theodore Burns		13–15	Piper	Honda
Shady Hill Clayworks	21	(United States) David Petzko	M	10–18, 22–24	Spectrum	Honda
Steelfiber	24	(United States) Christopher Horan		4–6, 10–12	Van Diemen	Honda
(United States) AntiSpeed	26	(United States) Charles Anti		10–12	Van Diemen	Honda
Practical Precision Engineering	30	(United States) Will Velkoff		4–6, 10–12, 16–18, 22–24	Van Diemen	Honda
Morgan's Collision Center	31	(United States) Scott Rubenzer	M	All	Spectrum	Honda
IAM Advisory	37	(United States) Joe Parsons	M	16–18	Spectrum	Honda
Home Tech Bldg. Consultants	41	(United States) Robert Albani	M	1–6, 10–12, 16–18, 22–24	Mygale	Honda
Flying Cross Motorsports	47	(United States) Austin Kimberly		10–18	Spectrum	Ford
Porter Racing	54	(United States) Charles Horn	M	13–15	Swift	Honda
Gross Racing	62	(United States) Robert Gross	M	10–12	Piper	Honda
Steel Services	72	(United States) Tom Schwietz	M	10–12	Citation	Honda
Bell Helmets	73	(United States) Robert Perona	M	13–15	Piper	Honda
Messenger Racing	75	(United States) Jay Messenger	G M	13–15	Van Diemen	Honda
ThermaMasters	85	(United States) David Livingston Jr.	M	4–9, 13–15	Spectrum	Honda
Hardline Motorsports	90	(United States) Omar Khan		1–3	Mygale	Honda
AdvAutomotive	93	(United States) Michael Bulzacchelli		10–12, 16–18, 22–24	Piper	Honda

Icon	Class
M	Masters
R	Rookie
G	Guest

== Schedule ==
Rd.	Date	Track	Location
1	April 1–3	Carolina Motorsports Park	Kershaw, South Carolina
2	April 1–3	Carolina Motorsports Park	Kershaw, South Carolina
3	April 1–3	Carolina Motorsports Park	Kershaw, South Carolina
4	April 30 – May 2	Mid-Ohio Sports Car Course	Lexington, Ohio
5	April 30 – May 2	Mid-Ohio Sports Car Course	Lexington, Ohio
6	April 30 – May 2	Mid-Ohio Sports Car Course	Lexington, Ohio
7	May 20–23	Barber Motorsports Park	Birmingham, Alabama
8	May 20–23	Barber Motorsports Park	Birmingham, Alabama
9	May 20–23	Barber Motorsports Park	Birmingham, Alabama
10	June 18–20	Pittsburgh International Race Complex	Wampum, Pennsylvania
11	June 18–20	Pittsburgh International Race Complex	Wampum, Pennsylvania
12	June 18–20	Pittsburgh International Race Complex	Wampum, Pennsylvania
13	July 30 – August 1	Road America	Elkhart Lake, Wisconsin
14	July 30 – August 1	Road America	Elkhart Lake, Wisconsin
15	July 30 – August 1	Road America	Elkhart Lake, Wisconsin
16	August 20–22	Summit Point Motorsports Park	Summit Point, West Virginia
17	August 20–22	Summit Point Motorsports Park	Summit Point, West Virginia
18	August 20–22	Summit Point Motorsports Park	Summit Point, West Virginia
19	September 10–12	Autobahn Country Club	Joliet, Illinois
20	September 10–12	Autobahn Country Club	Joliet, Illinois
21	September 10–12	Autobahn Country Club	Joliet, Illinois
22	October 15–17	Pittsburgh International Race Complex	Wampum, Pennsylvania
23	October 15–17	Pittsburgh International Race Complex	Wampum, Pennsylvania
24	October 15–17	Pittsburgh International Race Complex	Wampum, Pennsylvania
References: The 2021 Formula Race Promotions Schedule is Here

== Results ==
Round	Circuit	Location	Date	Pole position	Fastest lap	Winning driver
1	Carolina Motorsports Park	Kershaw, South Carolina	April 2	(United States) Nicholas d'Orlando	(United States) Robert Perona	(United States) Ax Kametches
2	Carolina Motorsports Park	Kershaw, South Carolina	April 3		(United States) Ax Kametches	(United States) Nicholas d'Orlando
3	Carolina Motorsports Park	Kershaw, South Carolina	April 3		(United States) Robert Perona	(United States) Nicholas d'Orlando
4	Mid-Ohio Sports Car Course	Lexington, Ohio	May 1	(United States) Simon Sikes	(United States) Simon Sikes	(United States) Simon Sikes
5	Mid-Ohio Sports Car Course	Lexington, Ohio	May 2		(United States) Simon Sikes	(United States) Simon Sikes
6	Mid-Ohio Sports Car Course	Lexington, Ohio	May 2		(United States) Nicholas d'Orlando	(United States) Simon Sikes
7	Barber Motorsports Park	Birmingham, Alabama	May 22	(United States) Jonathan Lee	(United States) Hugh Esterson	(United States) Jonathan Lee
8	Barber Motorsports Park	Birmingham, Alabama	May 23		(United States) Nicholas d'Orlando	(United States) Nicholas d'Orlando
9	Barber Motorsports Park	Birmingham, Alabama	May 23		(United States) Nicholas d'Orlando	(United States) Nicholas d'Orlando
10	Pittsburgh International Race Complex	Wampum, Pennsylvania	June 19	(United States) Thomas Schrage	(United States) Nicholas d'Orlando	(United States) Nicholas d'Orlando
11	Pittsburgh International Race Complex	Wampum, Pennsylvania	June 20		(United States) Nicholas d'Orlando	(United States) Joey Brienza
12	Pittsburgh International Race Complex	Wampum, Pennsylvania	June 20		(United States) Nicholas d'Orlando	(United States) Nicholas d'Orlando
13	Road America	Elkhart Lake, Wisconsin	July 31	(United States) Nicholas d'Orlando	(United States) Hugh Esterson	(United States) Joey Brienza
14	Road America	Elkhart Lake, Wisconsin	August 1		(United States) Kyle August	(United States) Will Holtz
15	Road America	Elkhart Lake, Wisconsin	August 1		(United States) Will Holtz	(United States) Nicholas d'Orlando
16	Summit Point Motorsports Park	Summit Point, West Virginia	August 20	(United States) Jonathan Lee	(United States) Kyle August	(United States) Joey Brienza
17	Summit Point Motorsports Park	Summit Point, West Virginia	August 21		(United States) Ax Kametches	(United States) Nicholas d'Orlando
18	Summit Point Motorsports Park	Summit Point, West Virginia	August 21		(United States) Nicholas d'Orlando	(United States) Nicholas d'Orlando
19	Autobahn Country Club	Joliet, Illinois	September 10	(United States) Nicholas d'Orlando	(United States) Nicholas d'Orlando	(United States) Nicholas d'Orlando
20	Autobahn Country Club	Joliet, Illinois	September 11		(United States) Thomas Schrage	(United States) Thomas Schrage
21	Autobahn Country Club	Joliet, Illinois	September 11		(United States) Ax Kametches	(United States) Thomas Schrage
22	Pittsburgh International Race Complex	Wampum, Pennsylvania	October 15	(United States) Nicholas d'Orlando	(United States) Nicholas d'Orlando	(United States) Nicholas d'Orlando
23	Pittsburgh International Race Complex	Wampum, Pennsylvania	October 16		(United States) Nicholas d'Orlando	(United States) Nicholas d'Orlando
24	Pittsburgh International Race Complex	Wampum, Pennsylvania	October 16		(United States) Kyle August	(United States) Thomas Schrage

== Scoring System ==
Points are awarded to the top twentyfive classified drivers, and the top drivers who enables to achieve the Pole Position or the Fastest Lap during the qualify session are awarded with the corrispective bonus points +3 and +2 points.

The Season Championship will recognize only driver’s best 21 of 24 race results including all bonus points earned.

Points are awarded using the following system:

Position	1st	2nd	3rd	4th	5th	6th	7th	8th	9th	10th	11th	12th	13th	14th	15th	16th	17th	18th	19th	20th	21st	22nd	23rd	24th	25th+	DNF
Points	50	42	37	34	31	29	27	25	23	21	19	17	15	13	11	10	9	8	7	6	5	4	3	2	1	1

Guest drivers are ineligible to score points.

== Driver Standings ==
Pos	Driver	CMP			MO			BAR			PITT-1			RA			SP			ABCC			PITT-2			Pts	Drop Pts
1	(United States) Nicholas d'Orlando	**13** (Note: Violation: 1.6.17.3 AVOIDABLE CONTACT 1.6.17.4 RACING ROOM and 1.6.17.5 SAFE PASS. - 15 Race Points.)	1	1	3	2	2	DNF	1	1	1	26	1	**3**	5	1	DNF	1	1	**1**	2	3	**1**	1	DNF	**904**	901
2	(United States) Ax Kametches	1	8	4	2	24	23	4	3	3	3	3	7	2	7	4	4	4	20	3	6	4	6	8	4	**736**	725
3	(United States) Joey Brienza	11	6	2	9	DNF	9	14	4	2	8	1	DNF	1	4	18	1	3	2	5	5	16	2	4	2	**698**	703
4	(United States) Will Holtz	4	4 (Note: Violation: 1.6.17.4 RACING ROOM and 1.6.17.5 SAFE PASS. - 15 Race Points.)	3	5	5	4	7	5	4	6	23	4	5	1	10	2	5	3	4	3	10	8	5	15	**717**	684
5	(United States) Hugh Esterson	3	12	7 (Note: Violation: 1.6.16.11.b - Not under control through a waving yellow flag 1.6.17.2 - Did not complete the full race distance. - 10 Race Points.)	7	4	10	2	9	8	2	16	3	6	11	6	DNF	7	4 (Note: 80 is in violation of 1.6.17.3: Avoidable Contact -10 Race Points)	6	9	2	3	3	3	**670**	642
6	(United States) Jonathan Lee	2	2	6	6	3	24	**1**	2	13	13	2	5	14	14	11	**16** (Note: 0 is in violation of 1.6.17.3: Avoidable Contact. -10 racing points)	6	7	10	10	8	5	6	19	**617**	605
7	(United States) Kyle August	5	5	5	8	5	4	6	8	5	7	6	9	7	8	5	3	8	6	7	8	9	7	7	5	**666**	603
8	(United States) Scott Rubenzer	7	7	8	14	11	11	11	12	10	9	7	8	9	DNF	12	5	9	9	DNF	15	11	9	9	7	**474**	471
9	(United States) Thomas Schrage				20	17	20				**4**	4	2							2	1	1	4	2	1	404	404
10	(United States) David Adorno				21	18	15	8	11	14	16	8	10	11	12	8	18	17	8	11	11	14	11	11	6	358	358
11	(United States) Mike Scanlan	9	10	14	24	20	18				20	17	18	18	16	13	8	11	13	14	14	13	18	16	13	262	262
12	(United States) David Livingston Jr.				10	6	7	5	7	11				13	18	7										204	204
13	(United States) Omar Khan	8	9	9	19	16	22	13	14	12	11	15	17	16	13	14										**199**	204
14	(United States) Bob Reid	10	15	12	25	22	19				15	10	21	17	15	15	10	DNS	16				13	20	10	202	202
15	(United States) TJ Zimmerman				26	14	13	9	10	7	22	5	11	21	10	9										193	193
16	(United States) Jeffrey Bartz				16	9	8	10	13	9				8	DNF	DNS				12	12	12				**177**	191
17	(United States) Sam Lockwood	12	13	15	23	19	16	12	DNS	DNS	19	20	19				12	13	17				20	15	12	175	175
18	(United States) Simon Sikes				**1**	1	1																			157	157
19	(United States) Ayrton Houk				15	10	5													8	7	6				144	144
20	(United States) Rob Albani	14	14	10	22	21	DNS				DNF	25	DNF				6 (Note: 41 is in violation of 1.6.17.4 & 1.6.17.5: Racing Room & Safe Pass. -15 racing points)	10	DNS				10	DNF	8	141	141
21	(United States) Will Velkoff				17	DNF	14				25	22	22				11	12	15				12	14	9	132	132
22	(United States) Joe Colasacco				11	7	DNF				5	9	12													118	118
23	(United States) Robert Perona	6	3	13 (Note: Violation: 1.6.17.4 RACING ROOM and 1.6.17.5 SAFE PASS. - 10 Race Points.)										22	3	DNF										117	117
24	(United States) Steve Oseth										21	13	14				7	DNS	10				14	19	18	109	109
25	(United States) Michael Bulzacchelli										17	11	DNF				15	15	12 (Note: 93 is in violation: 93 — 1.6.17.4: Racing Room. -10 Race Points)				17	10	11	**92**	106
26	(United States) John Dole										18	12	15				9	DNF	11				21	12	DNF	102	102
27	(United States) Dave Petzko										23	19	23	19	17	16	13	14	18				19	17	17	100	100
28	(United States) Christopher Horan				12	12	12				14	24	6													95	95
28	(United States) Dexter Czuba							3	6	6																95	95
30	(Canada) Misha Goikhberg													23	6	2										74	74
31	(New Zealand) Billy Frazer				4	23	3																			**59**	71
32	(Estonia) Tonis Kasemets																			9	13	7				65	65
32	(United States) Christopher Kierce																19	19	14				16	13	14	65	65
32	(Republic of Ireland) Peter Dempsey																			DNF	4	5				**46**	65
35	(United States) Andre Castro																DNF	2	5 (Note: 6 violates 1.6.17.4: Racing Room. -10 Race points)							64	64
36	(United States) Theo Peppes																14	16	DNF				15	18	16	53	53
37	(United States) Robert Dietz				13	8	17																			49	49
37	(United States) Steve Roux	15	11	11																						49	49
39	(United States) Robert Gross										24	21	24							13	16	15				45	45
40	(United States) Tim Kautz													4	DNF	17										44	44
41	(United States) Charles Anti										10	14	20													40	40
42	(United States) Austin Kimberly										12	27	16	DNS	DNF	DNF	DNS	DNS	DNS							**20**	29
43	(United States) Trevor Russell				18	15	21																			24	24
43	(United States) Tom Schwietz										DNF	18	13													24	24
43	(United States) Joe Parsons																17	18	19							24	24
46	(United States) Theodore Burns													12	DNF	DNS										18	18
47	(United States) Charles Horn													20	19	DNS										13	13
Drivers ineligible for points
	(United States) Jace Denmark													10	2	3											
	(United States) Jey Messenger													15	9	DNF											
Pos	Driver	CMP			MO			BAR			PITT-1			RA			SP			ABCC			PITT-2			Pts	Drop Pts
References: FRP Official Points Standings & Results Archive F1600 & Race Monitor

Color	Result
Gold	Winner
Silver	2nd-place finish
Bronze	3rd-place finish
Green	Top 5 finish
Light Blue	Top 10 finish
Dark Blue	Other flagged position
Purple	Did not finish
Red	Did not qualify (DNQ)
Brown	Withdrew (Wth)
Black	Disqualified (DSQ)
White	Did Not Start (DNS)
White	Race abandoned (C)
Blank	Did not participate

**In-line notation**
**Bold**	Pole position (3 points)
Italics	Fastest lap of the race (2 points)

Master of the Year
Masters

== Incident Reports ==
Carolina MotorSports Park April 1-3, 2021 F1600 Penalty Report
Summit Point - 2021 — F1600 Incident Report - Race 1 & 3

== See also ==
- 2021 F2000 Championship Series
