= 2023 USF2000 Championship =

American Open Wheel Racing season

The 2023 USF2000 Championship presented by Cooper Tires was the fourteenth season of the USF2000 Championship since its revival in 2010. When the top rung of the Road to Indy ladder system, Indy Lights, was bought by Penske Entertainment (owners of IndyCar) in 2021 and the lower level series changed sanctioning to the United States Auto Club, changes were made to the other championships in the ladder. This, together with the Indy Lights being rebranded to Indy NXT, effectively ended the "Road to Indy" branding, with the three championships below Indy NXT now collectively called "USF Pro Championships Presented by Cooper Tires". The USF2000 Championship served as the middle rung of this ladder.

Simon Sikes won the Drivers' Championship at the final race weekend at Portland with two races to spare. His team, Pabst Racing, won their second consecutive and fifth all-time championship.

== Drivers and teams ==
Team	No.	Drivers	Rounds
DC Autosport	57	(United States) Carson Etter	11–13, 16–18
DC Autosport	68	(United States) Ethan Ho	3–7, 9–13, 16–18
DEForce Racing	1	(Canada) Mac Clark	All
DEForce Racing	10	(Mexico) Jorge Garciarce	All
DEForce Racing	11	(United States) Brady Golan	11–13
DEForce Racing	11	(Brazil) Lucas Fecury	16–18
DEForce Racing	12	(United States) Maxwell Jamieson	All
Exclusive Autosport	90	(New Zealand) Jacob Douglas	1–7
Exclusive Autosport	90	(United States) Thomas Schrage	11–13, 16–18
Exclusive Autosport	91	(United States) Joey Brienza	1–2, 8, 14–15
Exclusive Autosport	92	(United States) Nicholas d'Orlando	1–2
Exclusive Autosport	92	(Canada) Lucas Mann	5–7
Exclusive Autosport	92	(United States) Jack Jeffers	9–10
Exclusive Autosport	93	(United States) Avery Towns	1–15
Exclusive Autosport	95	(United States) Chase Gardner	1–15
Future Star Racing	56	(United States) Andre Castro	1–2
Future Star Racing	58	(United States) Trey Burke	1–2
Jay Howard Driver Development	6	(Cyprus) Evagoras Papasavvas	All
Jay Howard Driver Development	7	(United States) Al Morey	All
Jay Howard Driver Development	8	(Australia) Lochie Hughes	All
Jay Howard Driver Development	9	(Canada) Louka St-Jean	1–4
Jay Howard Driver Development	9	(United States) Dane Scott	9–10
Jay Howard Driver Development	9	(United States) Logan Adams	11–15
Jay Howard Driver Development	9	(United States) Ava Dobson	16–18
Pabst Racing	22	(United States) Simon Sikes	All
Pabst Racing	23	(New Zealand) Jacob Douglas	9–18
Pabst Racing	24	(United States) Max Garcia	3–18
Sarah Fisher Hartman Racing Development	67	(United States) Elliot Cox	All
Velocity Racing Development	2	(Canada) Nico Christodoulou	14–15
Velocity Racing Development	14	(United States) Sam Corry	All
Velocity Racing Development	17	(United States) Nikita Johnson	All
Velocity Racing Development	18	(United States) Danny Dyszelski	1–13
Velocity Racing Development	19	(United States) Gordon Scully	All
Velocity Racing Development	33	(United States) Max Taylor	5–7, 9–13, 16–18
Velocity Racing Development	97	(United States) Zack Ping	1–7, 9–13

- TJ Speed Motorsports took over two cars from Cape Motorsports to enter the championship in 2023, but ultimately decided against it.
- Noah Ping was signed to compete for Velocity Racing Development, but dropped out and instead signed with VRD-partnered team Arden in GB3.

== Schedule ==
The 2023 schedule was revealed on October 17, 2022. It featured two street circuits, five road courses and one oval round. The championship returned to Sebring for the first time since 2013. All rounds except the weekends at Sebring and Indianapolis Raceway Park supported the IndyCar Series.

Rd.	Date	Race name	Track	Location
1	March 4–5	Cooper Tires Grand Prix of St. Petersburg	R Streets of St. Petersburg	St. Petersburg, Florida
2	March 4–5	Discount Tire Grand Prix of St. Petersburg	R Streets of St. Petersburg	St. Petersburg, Florida
3	March 25–26	Cooper Tires Grand Prix of Sebring	R Sebring International Raceway	Sebring, Florida
4	March 25–26	Cooper Tires Grand Prix of Sebring	R Sebring International Raceway	Sebring, Florida
5	May 12–13	USF2000 Discount Tire Grand Prix of Indianapolis	R Indianapolis Motor Speedway Road Course	Speedway, Indiana
6	May 12–13	USF2000 Discount Tire Grand Prix of Indianapolis	R Indianapolis Motor Speedway Road Course	Speedway, Indiana
7	May 12–13	USF2000 Discount Tire Grand Prix of Indianapolis	R Indianapolis Motor Speedway Road Course	Speedway, Indiana
8	May 27	USF2000 Cooper Tires Freedom 75	O Lucas Oil Indianapolis Raceway Park	Brownsburg, Indiana
9	June 17–18	Discount Tire Grand Prix of Road America	R Road America	Elkhart Lake, Wisconsin
10	June 17–18	Discount Tire Grand Prix of Road America	R Road America	Elkhart Lake, Wisconsin
11	July 1–2	Discount Tire Grand Prix of Mid-Ohio	R Mid-Ohio Sports Car Course	Lexington, Ohio
12	July 1–2	Discount Tire Grand Prix of Mid-Ohio	R Mid-Ohio Sports Car Course	Lexington, Ohio
13	July 1–2	Discount Tire Grand Prix of Mid-Ohio	R Mid-Ohio Sports Car Course	Lexington, Ohio
14	July 15–16	Cooper Tires Grand Prix of Toronto	R Exhibition Place	Toronto, Ontario, Canada
15	July 15–16	Cooper Tires Grand Prix of Toronto	R Exhibition Place	Toronto, Ontario, Canada
16	September 2–3	Discount Tire Grand Prix of Portland	R Portland International Raceway	Portland, Oregon
17	September 2–3	Discount Tire Grand Prix of Portland	R Portland International Raceway	Portland, Oregon
18	September 2–3	Discount Tire Grand Prix of Portland	R Portland International Raceway	Portland, Oregon

== Race results ==
Rd.	Track	Pole position	Fastest lap	Most laps led	Race winner	
Rd.	Track	Pole position	Fastest lap	Most laps led	Driver	Team
1	(United States) Streets of St. Petersburg	(Australia) Lochie Hughes	(United States) Simon Sikes	(Australia) Lochie Hughes	(Australia) Lochie Hughes	Jay Howard Driver Development
2	(United States) Streets of St. Petersburg	(United States) Simon Sikes	(United States) Simon Sikes	(United States) Nikita Johnson	(United States) Nikita Johnson	Velocity Racing Development
3	(United States) Sebring International Raceway	(United States) Simon Sikes	(United States) Simon Sikes	(Australia) Lochie Hughes	(Australia) Lochie Hughes	Jay Howard Driver Development
4	(United States) Sebring International Raceway	(United States) Simon Sikes	(United States) Simon Sikes	(United States) Simon Sikes	(United States) Simon Sikes	Pabst Racing
5	(United States) Indianapolis Motor Speedway Road Course	(United States) Nikita Johnson	(United States) Nikita Johnson	(United States) Nikita Johnson	(United States) Sam Corry	Velocity Racing Development
6	(United States) Indianapolis Motor Speedway Road Course	(United States) Nikita Johnson	(United States) Simon Sikes	(United States) Simon Sikes	(United States) Simon Sikes	Pabst Racing
7	(United States) Indianapolis Motor Speedway Road Course	(United States) Simon Sikes	(United States) Simon Sikes	(Australia) Lochie Hughes	(Australia) Lochie Hughes	Jay Howard Driver Development
8	(United States) Lucas Oil Indianapolis Raceway Park	(Canada) Mac Clark	(Canada) Mac Clark	(Canada) Mac Clark	(Canada) Mac Clark	DEForce Racing
9	(United States) Road America	(Australia) Lochie Hughes	(Canada) Mac Clark	(United States) Simon Sikes	(United States) Simon Sikes	Pabst Racing
10	(United States) Road America	(Canada) Mac Clark	(United States) Danny Dyszelski	(Australia) Lochie Hughes	(Australia) Lochie Hughes	Jay Howard Driver Development
11	(United States) Mid-Ohio Sports Car Course	(Cyprus) Evagoras Papasavvas	(United States) Nikita Johnson	(Cyprus) Evagoras Papasavvas	(Cyprus) Evagoras Papasavvas	Jay Howard Driver Development
12	(United States) Mid-Ohio Sports Car Course	(United States) Simon Sikes	(United States) Simon Sikes	(United States) Simon Sikes	(Canada) Mac Clark	DEForce Racing
13	(United States) Mid-Ohio Sports Car Course	(United States) Simon Sikes	(United States) Simon Sikes	(United States) Simon Sikes	(United States) Simon Sikes	Pabst Racing
14	(Canada) Exhibition Place	(Cyprus) Evagoras Papasavvas	(Canada) Mac Clark	(United States) Nikita Johnson	(United States) Simon Sikes	Pabst Racing
15	(Canada) Exhibition Place	(United States) Simon Sikes	(Canada) Nico Christodoulou	(United States) Simon Sikes	(Canada) Nico Christodoulou	Velocity Racing Development
16	(United States) Portland International Raceway	(New Zealand) Jacob Douglas	(Cyprus) Evagoras Papasavvas	(New Zealand) Jacob Douglas	(New Zealand) Jacob Douglas	Pabst Racing
17	(United States) Portland International Raceway	(New Zealand) Jacob Douglas	(United States) Simon Sikes	(New Zealand) Jacob Douglas	(New Zealand) Jacob Douglas	Pabst Racing
18	(United States) Portland International Raceway	(New Zealand) Jacob Douglas	(New Zealand) Jacob Douglas	(United States) Simon Sikes	(United States) Simon Sikes	Pabst Racing

== Championship standings ==
=== Drivers' Championship ===
Scoring system

Position	**1st**	**2nd**	**3rd**	**4th**	**5th**	**6th**	**7th**	**8th**	**9th**	**10th**	**11th**	**12th**	**13th**	**14th**	**15th**	**16th**	**17th**	**18th**	**19th**	**20th+**
Points	30	25	22	19	17	15	14	13	12	11	10	9	8	7	6	5	4	3	2	1
Points (O)	45	38	33	29	26	23	21	20	18	17	15	14	12	11	9	8	6	5	3	2

- The driver who qualified on pole was awarded one additional point.
- One point was awarded to the driver who led the most laps in a race.
- One point was awarded to the driver who set the fastest lap during the race.

Pos	Driver	STP		SEB		IMS			IRP	ROA		MOH			TOR		POR			Points
1	(United States) Simon Sikes	4	**2**	**2**	**1***	13	1*	**3**	3	1*	10	2	**17***	**1***	1	**2***	3	2	1*	447
2	(United States) Nikita Johnson	3	1*	16	8	**3***	**3**	2	5	3	5	5	4	2	7*	18	4	3	7	344
3	(Australia) Lochie Hughes	**1***	3	1*	4	2	2	1*	6	**12**	1*	4	19	22	15	3	5	13	10	335
4	(Cyprus) Evagoras Papasavvas	2	4	3	10	19	9	6	2	8	19	**1***	2	4	**6**	7	2	5	6	323
5	(Canada) Mac Clark	11	20	4	2	14	4	10	**1***	16	**2**	3	1	3	4	13	8	4	9	318
6	(New Zealand) Jacob Douglas	8	15	13	3	15	6	20		2	6	23	6	15	13	5	**1***	**1***	**2**	249
7	(United States) Sam Corry	5	11	8	19	1	5	16	12	19	20	7	3	5	9	6	16	17	3	222
8	(Mexico) Jorge Garciarce	13	5	9	6	6	10	14	10	9	4	8	8	20	14	4	17	6	14	212
9	(United States) Max Garcia			6	7	18	12	4	7	15	3	20	5	7	2	15	6	18	5	207
10	(United States) Chase Gardner	12	14	5	9	5	15	15	4	4	7	10	7	6	8	17				193
11	(United States) Al Morey	15	10	15	11	7	17	13	8	18	13	9	16	10	12	9	7	10	13	172
12	(United States) Elliot Cox	18	18	7	5	16	7	17	9	5	18	22	23	23	17	14	10	8	12	145
13	(United States) Danny Dyszelski	16	7	10	17	4	8	7	16	10	8	12	15	8						141
14	(United States) Ethan Ho			18	15	8	11	5		7	9	6	9	12			19	7	11	137
15	(United States) Gordon Scully	19	8	12	12	11	18	9	15	14	14	18	14	16	16	16	9	12	15	133
16	(United States) Maxwell Jamieson	17	9	17	14	10	19	19	13	17	16	16	11	17	10	10	14	14	18	121
17	(United States) Avery Towns	20	12	14	16	12	13	18	11	21	15	21	18	11	11	8				101
18	(United States) Max Taylor					17	16	8		6	21	11	22	19			11	9	8	86
19	(United States) Zack Ping	21	17	19	13	9	20	11		20	11	14	20	18						60
20	(United States) Thomas Schrage											13	10	9			18	19	4	55
21	(Canada) Nico Christodoulou														5	1				48
22	(United States) Logan Adams											15	21	21	3	11				40
23	(United States) Carson Etter											19	13	14			15	11	16	38
24	(United States) Joey Brienza	10	16						14						18	12				37
25	(United States) Trey Burke	7	6																	29
26	(United States) Nicholas d'Orlando	6	13																	23
27	(Canada) Louka St-Jean	14	19	11	18															22
28	(United States) Brady Golan											17	12	13						21
29	(United States) Jack Jeffers									11	12									19
30	(Brazil) Lucas Fecury																12	15	17	19
31	(Canada) Lucas Mann					20	14	12												17
32	(United States) Ava Dobson																13	16	19	15
33	(United States) Andre Castro	9	21																	13
34	(United States) Dane Scott									13	17									12
Pos	Driver	STP		SEB		IMS			IRP	ROA		MOH			TOR		POR			Points

Color	Result
Gold	Winner
Silver	2nd place
Bronze	3rd place
Green	4th & 5th place
Light Blue	6th–10th place
Dark Blue	Finished (Outside Top 10)
Purple	Did not finish
Red	Did not qualify (DNQ)
Brown	Withdrawn (Wth)
Black	Disqualified (DSQ)
White	Did not start (DNS)
Blank	Did not participate

**In-line notation**
**Bold**	Pole position (1 point)
Italics	Ran fastest race lap (1 point)
*	Led most race laps (1 point); Not awarded if more than one driver led most laps
Rookie

=== Teams' championship ===
Scoring system

Position	**1st**	**2nd**	**3rd**	**4th**	**5th**	**6th**	**7th**	**8th**	**9th**	**10th+**
Points	22	18	15	12	10	8	6	4	2	1

- Single car teams received 3 bonus points per race as an equivalency to multi-car teams
- Only the best two results counted for teams fielding more than two entries

Pos	Driver	STP		SEB		IMS			IRP	ROA		MOH			TOR		POR			Points
1	Pabst Racing	4	2	2	1	10	1	3	3	1	3	2	5	1	1	2	1	1	1	476
1	Pabst Racing			6	7	12	11	4	7	2	6	12	6	7	2	5	3	2	2	476
2	Jay Howard Driver Development	1	3	1	4	2	2	1	2	8	1	1	2	4	3	3	2	5	5	413
2	Jay Howard Driver Development	2	4	3	10	6	7	6	6	10	11	4	12	9	6	7	5	10	8	413
3	Velocity Racing Development	3	1	8	8	1	3	2	5	3	5	5	3	2	5	1	4	3	3	372
3	Velocity Racing Development	5	7	10	11	3	5	7	11	6	8	7	4	5	7	6	7	9	6	372
4	DEForce Racing	10	5	4	2	4	4	8	1	9	2	3	1	3	4	4	6	4	7	272
4	DEForce Racing	11	8	9	6	9	9	10	9	12	4	8	8	11	9	9	9	6	11	272
5	Exclusive Autosport	6	9	5	3	5	6	9	4	4	7	9	7	6	8	8	11	12	4	157
5	Exclusive Autosport	8	10	11	9	8	12	11	10	11	10	10	10	8	10	10				157
6	Sarah Fisher Hartman Racing Development	12	11	7	5	11	8	12	8	5	12	13	12	13	11	11	8	8	10	109
7	DC Autosport			12	12	7	10	5		7	9	6	9	10			10	7	9	74
7	DC Autosport											11	11	12			12	11	12	74
8	Future Star Racing	7	6																	17
8	Future Star Racing	9	12																	17
Pos	Driver	STP		ALA		IMS			IRP	ROA		MOH			TOR		POR			Points

== See also ==
- 2023 IndyCar Series
- 2023 Indy NXT
- 2023 USF Pro 2000 Championship
- 2023 USF Juniors
