= Formula Continental =

Single seater, open wheel racing class motorsport

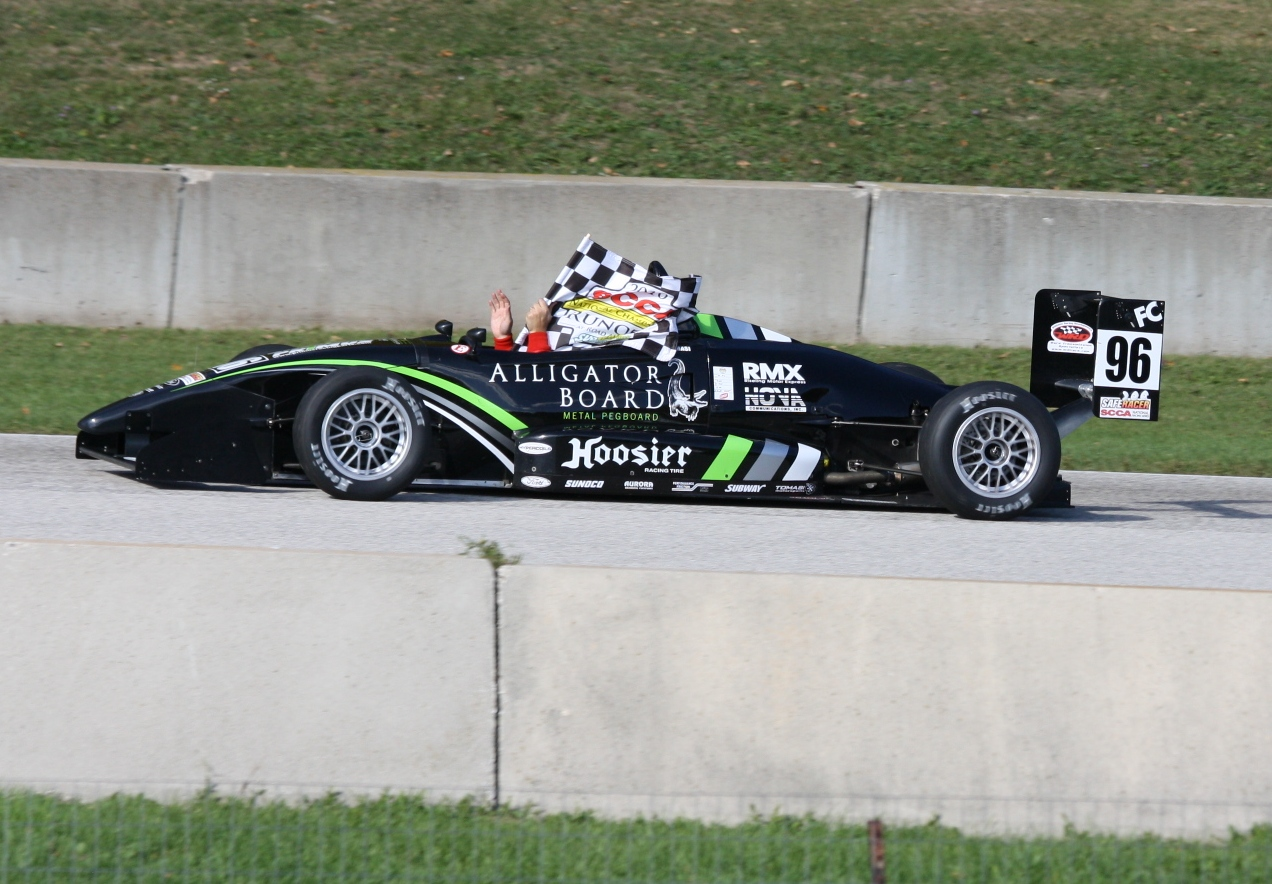
Formula Continental winner at 2010 SCCA National Championship Runoffs

Formula Continental is a single seater, open wheel racing class in motorsports. It replaced Formula C as a Sports Car Club of America (SCCA) racing class.

Most Formula Continental cars are Formula Ford 2000 (FF2000) models, which is a flat bottomed, steel tube frame open wheel car with smaller wings and a 2-liter engine derived from the steel blocked Ford Pinto, Ford Zetec, or Mazda MZR engines.

== Formula Continental at the SCCA National Championship Runoffs ==
Year	Driver	Car
1979	(United States) Thomas Pomeroy	Argo JM2
1980	(United States) Curtis Farley	Argo JM2
1981	(United States) Jim Hickman	Ralt RT5
1982	(United States) Terry McKenna	Ralt RT5
1983	(United States) Terry McKenna	Ralt RT5
1984	(United States) Terry McKenna	Ralt RT5
1985	(United States) Louis Rettenmeier	Ralt RT5
1986	(United States) Louis Rettenmeier	Ralt RT5
1987	(United States) Louis Rettenmeier	Ralt RT5
1988	(Canada) Claude Bourbonnais	Reynard 87SF
1989	(United States) Bobby Carville	Reynard
1990	(United States) Craig Taylor	Swift DB6
1991	(United States) Thomas Schwietz Jr.	Swift DB6
1992	(United States) Dave Weitzenhof	Citation 88SF
1993	(United States) Sam Schmidt	Van Diemen RF93
1994	(United States) Allen May	Van Diemen RF94
1995	(United States) David Pook	Van Diemen
1996	(United States) Justin Pritchard	Van Diemen
1997	(United States) B.J. Zacharias	Van Diemen
1998	(United States) Dave Weitzenhof	Citation 88SF
1999	(United States) Mike Andersen	Van Diemen RF97
2000	(Estonia) Tõnis Kasemets	Mygale SJ99
2001	(United States) Mike Andersen	Van Diemen RF00
2002	(United States) Andrew Prendeville	Van Diemen RF01
2003	(United States) Mike Andersen	Van Diemen RF00
2004	(United States) Brian Tomasi	Van Diemen RF01
2005	(United States) Niki Coello	Van Diemen RF01
2006	(United States) Niki Coello	Van Diemen RF01
2007	(United States) Charles Shaffer	Van Diemen RF00
2008	(United States) Niki Coello	Van Diemen RF01
2009	(United States) Niki Coello	Van Diemen RF01
2010	(United States) Brian Tomasi	Van Diemen DP08
2011	(United States) Revere Greist	Van Diemen DP07
2012	(United States) Gerry Szykulski	Van Diemen DP08
2013	(United States) Peter Portante	Van Diemen RF01
2014	(United States) Robert Allaer	Van Diemen RF02
2015	(China) Luo Yufeng	Van Diemen DP08
2016	(United States) John LaRue	Citation Snipe FC
2017	(United States) Austin McCusker	Van Diemen RF02
2018	(United States) Jason Reichert	Van Diemen RF03
2019	(United States) Tim Minor	Citation US2000
2020	(United States) Robert Allaer	Van Diemen RF02
2021	(United States) Simon Sikes	Citation US2000
2022	(United States) Nolan Allaer	Van Diemen RF02
2023	(United States) Nolan Allaer	Van Diemen RF02
2024	(United States) Michael Varacins	Van Diemen RF02
2025	(United States) Brandon Dixon	Citation US2000
