= 2026 IMSA Ford Mustang Challenge =

North American motor Racing Championship held in 2026

The 2026 IMSA Ford Mustang Challenge was the third season of the IMSA Ford Mustang Challenge. It began on March 18 at Sebring International Raceway and finished on October 6 at Circuit of the Americas.

== Schedule ==
The schedule was announced August 1, 2025, featuring 12 races over six double header events.

Round	Circuit	Location	Dates	Supporting
1	Sebring International Raceway	Sebring, Florida	March 18–20	IMSA SportsCar Championship
2	WeatherTech Raceway Laguna Seca	Monterey, California	May 1–3	IMSA SportsCar Championship
3	Mid-Ohio Sports Car Course	Lexington, Ohio	June 5–7	IMSA SportsCar Championship
4	Watkins Glen International	(New York (state)) Watkins Glen, New York	June 25–27	IMSA SportsCar Championship
5	Virginia International Raceway	Alton, Virginia	August 21–23	IMSA SportsCar Championship
6	Circuit of the Americas	Austin, Texas	September 4–6	FIA World Endurance Championship

== Entries ==
All teams use the Ford Mustang Dark Horse R.

Team	No.	Driver(s)	Class	Rounds
(United States) Spark Performance	3	(United States) Nolan Allaer	DH	2–3
(United States) Spark Performance	33	(United States) Alex Bachoura	DHL	1
(United States) Wheelhouse Motorsports	7	(United States) Sandy Satullo	DH	All
(United States) Wheelhouse Motorsports	8	(United States) Tom Tait	DHL	All
(United States) Wheelhouse Motorsports	17	(United States) Jim Farley	DH	1–3
(United States) Wheelhouse Motorsports	34	(United States) Will Lucas	DH	All
(United States) Wheelhouse Motorsports	63	(United States) Joseph Dederichs	DHL	All
(United States) Wheelhouse Motorsports	77	(United States) Michael Tosi	DH	1–2
(United States) Wheelhouse Motorsports	77	(United States) Dan McKeever	DHL	6
(United States) Paley Motorsport with AAG Racing	9	(United States) Chris Clarke	DHL	1–2, 4–6
(United States) Paley Motorsport with AAG Racing	29	(United States) Ryan Persing	DH	1–2, 4–6
(United States) NV Autosport	10	(United States) Stephen Vajda	DHL	4
(United States) TechSport Racing	18	(United States) Justin Gravett	DH	6
(United States) TechSport Racing	21	(United States) Colin Harrison	DH	1, 3–6
(United States) TechSport Racing	22	(United States) Devin Anderson	DH	All
(United States) Flying Lion Motorsports	25	(United States) Bruce Griffin	DHL	1
(United States) Flying Lion Motorsports	25	(United States) Ethan Low	DH	3–6
(United States) G2 Motorsports	28	(United States) Louis Gigliotti	DH	1, 3
(United States) Birdhouse Racing	37	(United States) Dave Luaces	DHL	3
(United States) Round 3 Racing	42	(United States) Cole Loftsgard	DH	All
(United States) Round 3 Racing	70	(United States) Joe Koenig	DHL	2–3
(United States) Round 3 Racing	70	(United States) Oleg Gorshkov	DHL	4–5
(United States) Round 3 Racing	70	(United States) Brad McCall	DHL	6
(United States) Nick Smither Racing	58	(United States) Nicholas Smither	DHL	1–2, 4–5
(United States) Nick Smither Racing	88	(Canada) Walter Bobko	DHL	1–2, 4–5
(United States) Torre Racing	79	(United States) Drew Neubauer	DHL	4
(United States) Torre Racing	84	(United States) Paolo Salvatore	DHL	All
(United States) Peterson Racing	87	(United States) Doug Peterson	DHL	1
(United States) Peterson Racing	87	(United States) Doug Peterson	DH	3–4
(United States) Automatic Racing	98	(United States) Tate Pritt	DH	All

Icon	Class
DH	Dark Horse
DHL	Dark Horse Legends

== Race results ==
Bold indicates overall winner.

Round		Circuit	Pole position	Fastest lap	Dark Horse Winner	Legends Winner
1	R1	Sebring	(United States) #42 Round 3 Racing	(United States) #42 Round 3 Racing	(United States) #42 Round 3 Racing	(United States) #33 Spark Performance
1	R1	Sebring	(United States) Cole Loftsgard	(United States) Cole Loftsgard	(United States) Cole Loftsgard	(United States) Alex Bachoura
1	R2	Sebring	(United States) #77 Wheelhouse Motorsports	(United States) #77 Wheelhouse Motorsports	(United States) #42 Round 3 Racing	(United States) #33 Spark Performance
1	R2	Sebring	(United States) Michael Tosi	(United States) Michael Tosi	(United States) Cole Loftsgard	(United States) Alex Bachoura
2	R1	Laguna Seca	(United States) Devin Anderson	(United States) Devin Anderson	(United States) #42 Round 3 Racing	(United States) #58 Nick Smither Racing
2	R1	Laguna Seca	(United States) #22 TechSport Racing	(United States) #22 TechSport Racing	(United States) Cole Loftsgard	(United States) Nicholas Smither
2	R2	Laguna Seca	(United States) Devin Anderson	(United States) Devin Anderson	(United States) Devin Anderson	(United States) #8 Wheelhouse Motorsports
2	R2	Laguna Seca	(United States) #22 TechSport Racing	(United States) #22 TechSport Racing	(United States) #22 TechSport Racing	(United States) Tom Tait
3	R1	Mid-Ohio	(United States) #42 Round 3 Racing	(United States) #42 Round 3 Racing	(United States) #42 Round 3 Racing	(United States) #84 Torre Racing
3	R1	Mid-Ohio	(United States) Cole Loftsgard	(United States) Cole Loftsgard	(United States) Cole Loftsgard	(United States) Paolo Salvatore
3	R2	Mid-Ohio	(United States) #42 Round 3 Racing	(United States) #7 Wheelhouse Motorsports	(United States) #22 TechSport Racing	(United States) #8 Wheelhouse Motorsports
3	R2	Mid-Ohio	(United States) Cole Loftsgard	(United States) Sandy Satullo	(United States) Devin Anderson	(United States) Tom Tait
4	R1	Watkins Glen	(United States) #42 Round 3 Racing	(United States) #22 TechSport Racing	(United States) #42 Round 3 Racing	(United States) #70 Round 3 Racing
4	R1	Watkins Glen	(United States) Cole Loftsgard	(United States) Devin Anderson	(United States) Cole Loftsgard	(United States) Oleg Gorshkov
4	R2	Watkins Glen	(United States) #22 TechSport Racing	(United States) #22 TechSport Racing	(United States) #42 Round 3 Racing	(United States) #70 Round 3 Racing
4	R2	Watkins Glen	(United States) Devin Anderson	(United States) Devin Anderson	(United States) Cole Loftsgard	(United States) Oleg Gorshkov
5	R1	VIR	(United States) #42 Round 3 Racing	(United States) #22 TechSport Racing	(United States) #42 Round 3 Racing	(United States) #70 Round 3 Racing
5	R1	VIR	(United States) Cole Loftsgard	(United States) Devin Anderson	(United States) Cole Loftsgard	(United States) Oleg Gorshkov
5	R2	VIR	(United States) #42 Round 3 Racing	(United States) #22 TechSport Racing	(United States) #34 Wheelhouse Motorsports	(United States) #70 Round 3 Racing
5	R2	VIR	(United States) Cole Loftsgard	(United States) Devin Anderson	(United States) Will Lucas	(United States) Oleg Gorshkov
6	R1	COTA	(United States) Devin Anderson	(United States) Devin Anderson	(United States) Devin Anderson	(United States) #9 Paley Motorsport with AAG Racing
6	R1	COTA	(United States) #22 TechSport Racing	(United States) #22 TechSport Racing	(United States) #22 TechSport Racing	(United States) Chris Clarke
6	R2	COTA	(United States) #42 Round 3 Racing	(United States) #42 Round 3 Racing	(United States) Devin Anderson	(United States) #70 Round 3 Racing
6	R2	COTA	(United States) Cole Loftsgard	(United States) Cole Loftsgard	(United States) #22 TechSport Racing	(United States) Brad McCall

== Championship standings ==
=== Points system ===
Championship points are awarded at the finish of each event according to the chart below. Ten bonus points each are awarded for the driver who earns the pole position and runs the fastest lap in each race event.

Position	1	2	3	4	5	6	7	8	9	10	11	12	13	14	15	16	17	18	19	20	21	22	23	24	25	26	27	28	29	30+
Points	350	320	300	280	260	250	240	230	220	210	200	190	180	170	160	150	140	130	120	110	100	90	80	70	60	50	40	30	20	10

=== Drivers' Championship ===
==== Standings: DH Drivers ====
Pos.	Driver	SEB (Florida)		LGA (California)		MOH (Ohio)		WGI (New York (state))		VIR (Virginia)		COT (Texas)		Bonus	Total Points
Pos.	Driver	R1	R2	R1	R2	R1	R2	R1	R2	R1	R2	R1	R2	Bonus	Total Points
1	(United States) Cole Loftsgard	**1**	1	1	4	**1**	**2**	**1**	1	**1**	**3**	2	**2**	90	4080
2	(United States) Devin Anderson	4	3	**2**	**1**	2	1	2	**2**	2	4	**1**	1	110	3970
3	(United States) Will Lucas	3	5	4	3	4	3	9	7	3	1	3	3	0	3430
4	(United States) Sandy Satullo	5	4	3	2	3	5	3	9	4	2	5	5	10	3370
5	(United States) Tate Pritt	7	7	5	7	7	7	5	4	5	6	4	8	0	3020
6	(United States) Ryan Persing	8	6	6	5			7	5	7	7	9	9	0	2410
7	(United States) Colin Harrison	6	8			9	9	6	6	6	8	7	7	0	2380
8	(United States) Ethan Low					6	4	4	3	8	5	8	4	0	2110
9	(United States) Doug Peterson	9	9	7	8	8	8	8	8					0	1830
10	(United States) Nolan Allaer			9	6	7	6							0	980
11	(United States) Michael Tosi	2	**2**	8	DNS									20	890
12	(United States) Justin Gravett											6	6	0	500
13	(United States) Louis Gigliotti	10	10											0	420
Drivers Ineligible to Score Points
—	(United States) Jim Farley	10	10	6	7	10	9							0	0

Colour	Result
Gold	Winner
Silver	Second place
Bronze	Third place
Green	Points classification
Blue	Non-points classification
Blue	Non-classified finish (NC)
Purple	Retired, not classified (Ret)
Red	Did not qualify (DNQ)
Red	Did not pre-qualify (DNPQ)
Black	Disqualified (DSQ)
White	Did not start (DNS)
White	Withdrew (WD)
White	Race cancelled (C)
Blank	Did not practice (DNP)
Blank	Did not arrive (DNA)
Blank	Excluded (EX)

**Bold** - Pole position
Italics - Fastest lap

==== Standings: DHL Drivers ====
Pos.	Driver	SEB (Florida)		LGA (California)		MOH (Ohio)		WGI (New York (state))		VIR (Virginia)		COT (Texas)		Bonus	Total Points
Pos.	Driver	R1	R2	R1	R2	R1	R2	R1	R2	R1	R2	R1	R2	Bonus	Total Points
1	(United States) Tom Tait	2	3	3	1	4	**1**	**3**	2	2	5	6	3	40	3700
2	(United States) Chris Clarke	3	2	**2**	**2**	5	6	2	3	7	**4**	1	4	70	3600
3	(United States) Paolo Salvatore	4	4	4	6	1	2	5	9	5	3	3	**2**	10	3430
4	(United States) Joseph Dederichs	7	7	6	3	2	3	4	6	6	DNS	4	5	10	2980
5	(United States) Nicholas Smither	5	5	1	4			7	4	3	2			0	2290
6	(United States) Walter Bobko	6	6	5	5			9	8	4	6			0	2000
7	(United States) Oleg Gorshkov							1	**1**	**1**	1			40	1440
8	(United States) Joe Koenig			7	DNS	3	4							0	820
9	(United States) Alex Bachoura	**1**	**1**											40	740
10	(United States) Brad McCall											2	1	0	670
11	(United States) Dave Luaces					**6**	5							10	520
12	(United States) Dan McKeever											**5**	6	10	520
13	(United States) Stephen Vajda							6	5					0	510
14	(United States) Drew Neubauer							8	7					0	470
15	(United States) Lou Gigliotti					DNS	DNS							0	0
16	(United States) Bruce Griffin	DNS	DNS											0	0

=== Teams' Championship ===
Pos.	Entrant	Points
1	(United States) Round 3 Racing	4120
2	(United States) TechSport Racing	4010
3	(United States) Wheelhouse Motorsports	3690
4	(United States) Automatic Racing	3130
5	(United States) Paley Motorsport with AAG Racing	3000
6	(United States) Torre Racing	2790
7	(United States) Flying Lion Motorsports	2160
8	(United States) Peterson Racing	1890
9	(United States) Nick Smither Racing	1880
10	(United States) Spark Performance	1580
11	(United States) NV Autosport	450
12	(United States) Birdhouse Racing	430
13	(United States) G2 Motorsports	420

== See also ==
- 2026 Mustang Cup Australia
