= Simon Sikes =

American racing driver

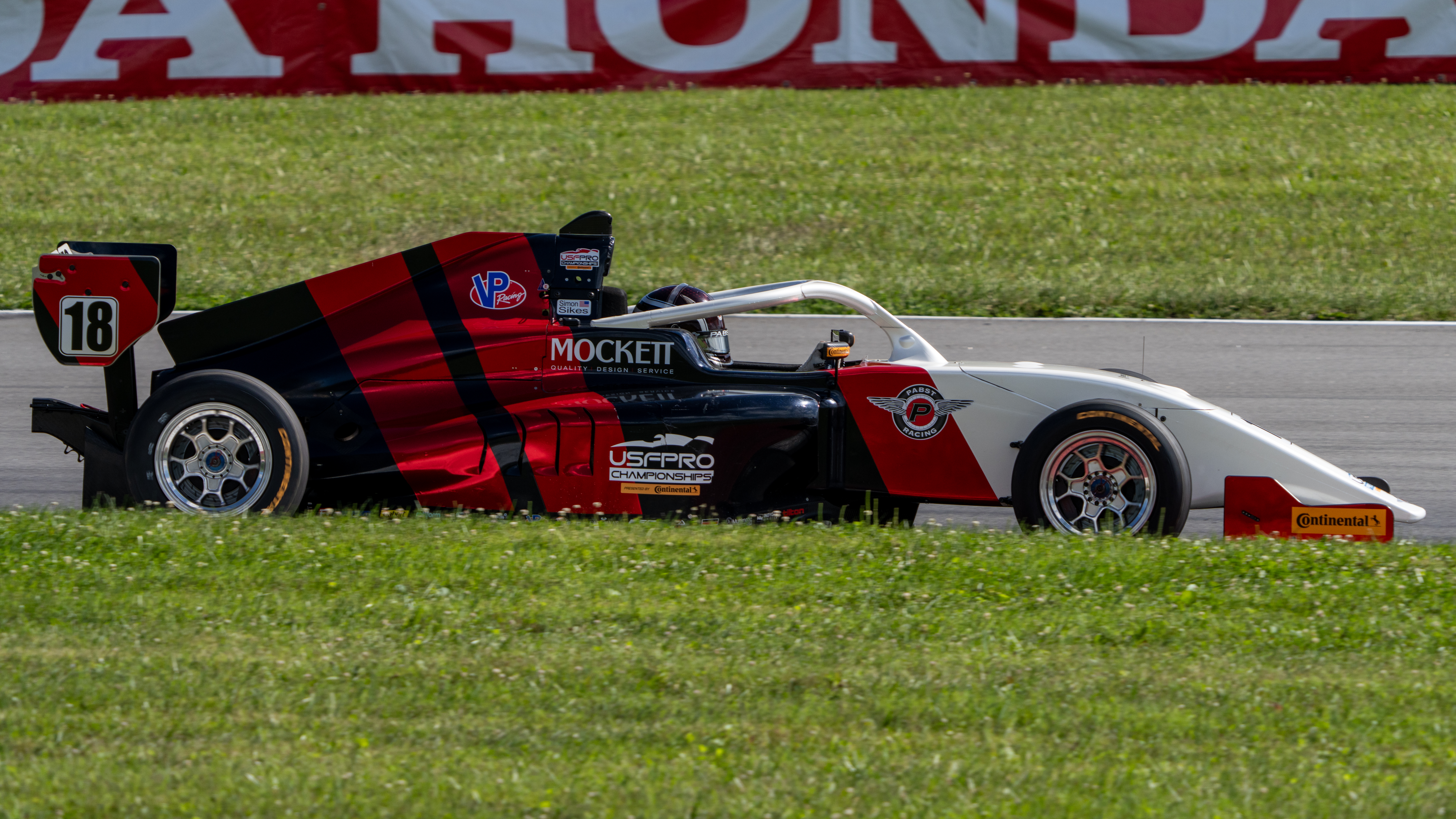
- Sikes at the Mid-Ohio Sports Car Course in 2024
- Nationality: (United States) American
- Born: December 7, 2000 (age 25) Atlanta, Georgia, United States

USF2000 Championship career
- Debut season: 2020
- Current team: Pabst Racing
- Car number: 22
- Starts: 44
- Wins: 6
- Podiums: 18
- Poles: 7
- Fastest laps: 10
- Best finish: 1st in 2023

Previous series
- 2017–21 2020–21 2018: F1600 Championship Series; SCCA Formula F F2000 Championship Series

Championship titles
- 2023 2021 2020 2020: USF2000 Championship; SCCA Runoffs Formula Continental; F1600 Championship Series; SCCA Runoffs Formula F

Simon Sikes (born December 7, 2000) is an American racing driver. He currently competes in the USF2000 Championship with Pabst Racing. He is the 2023 USF2000 champion.

== Career ==
=== USF2000 Championship ===
Having competed in three part-time seasons of the USF2000 Championship from 2020 onwards, Sikes would complete a full season in the series in 2023 with Pabst Racing. At the second round at Sebring, Sikes would get his maiden victory in the series. He would win a further five races and clinched the title at the final weekend.

=== USF Pro 2000 ===
For the 2024 season, Sikes would use his scholarship money from winning the USF2000 series to progress to the USF Pro 2000 Championship, where he remained with Pabst Racing.

== Racing record ==
=== Career summary ===
Season	Series	Team	Races	Wins	Poles	F/Laps	Podiums	Points	Position
2017	F1600 Championship Series	Rice Race Prep	3	0	0	0	0	99	20th
2018	F2000 Championship Series	Primus Racing	14	1	0	1	4	387	5th
2019	F1600 Championship Series	Rice Race Prep	3	2	0	1	2	133	17th
2020	Formula F SCCA National Championship Runoffs	Rice Race Prep	1	1	1	0	1	0	**1st**
2020	Formula Continental SCCA National Championship Runoffs	Rice Race Prep	1	0	0	0	1	0	**2nd**
2020	F1600 Championship Series	Rice Race Prep	14	8	2	2	11	464	**1st**
2020	U.S. F2000 National Championship	Legacy Autosport	8	0	0	0	0	70	19th
2021	Formula F SCCA National Championship Runoffs	Rice Race Prep	1	0	0	0	1	0	**2nd**
2021	Formula Continental SCCA National Championship Runoffs	Rice Race Prep	1	1	0	1	1	0	**1st**
2021	F1600 Championship Series	Rice Race Prep	3	3	3	2	3	157	18th
2021	U.S. F2000 National Championship	Legacy Autosport	10	0	0	1	4	136	14th
2022	U.S. F2000 National Championship	Legacy Autosport	8	0	0	0	0	119	14th
2023	USF2000 Championship	Pabst Racing	18	6	7	9	14	447	**1st**
2024	F1600 Championship Series	Rice Race Prep	2	0	0	1	1	48	33rd
2024	USF Pro 2000 Championship	Pabst Racing	18	2	1	4	5	272	4th
2025	USF2000 Championship	Sarah Fisher Hartman Racing	2	0	0	0	0	32	22nd

* Season still in progress.

=== SCCA National Championship Runoffs ===
Year	Track	Car	Engine	Class	Finish	Start	Status
2020	Road America	Mygale SJ12	Honda	Formula F	1	1	Running
2020	Road America	Citation	Ford	Formula Continental	2	4	Running
2021	Indianapolis	Mygale SJ12	Honda	Formula F	2	2	Running
2021	Indianapolis	Citation	Ford	Formula Continental	1	2	Running

=== American open-wheel racing results ===
==== USF2000 Championship ====
(key) (Races in bold indicate pole position) (Races in italics indicate fastest lap) (Races with * indicate most race laps led)

Year	Team	1	2	3	4	5	6	7	8	9	10	11	12	13	14	15	16	17	18	Rank	Points
2020	Legacy Autosport	ROA; 1	ROA; 2	MOH; 1	MOH; 2	MOH; 3	LOR	IMS; 1; 16	IMS; 2; 12	IMS; 3; 16	MOH; 4; 13	MOH; 5; 18	MOH; 6; 4	NJMP; 1	NJMP; 2	NJMP; 3	STP; 1; 8	STP; 2; 13		19th	70
2021	Legacy Autosport	ALA; 1; 16	ALA; 2; 17	STP; 1	STP; 2	IMS; 1; 11	IMS; 2; 14	IMS; 3; 21	LOR	ROA; 1; 7	ROA; 2; 2	MOH; 1; 3	MOH; 2; 3	MOH; 3; 2	NJMP; 1	NJMP; 2	NJMP; 3	MOH; 4	MOH; 5	14th	136
2022	Legacy Autosport	STP; 1; 5	STP; 2; 10	ALA; 1; 5	ALA; 2; 5	IMS; 1; 9	IMS; 2; 9	IMS; 3; 9	IRP; 8	ROA; 1	ROA; 2	MOH; 1	MOH; 2	MOH; 3	TOR; 1	TOR; 2	POR; 1	POR; 2	POR; 3	14th	119
2023	Pabst Racing	STP; 1; 4	**STP**; **2**; 2	**SEB**; **1**; 2	**SEB**; **2**; 1	IMS; 1; 15	IMS; 2; 1*	**IMS**; **3**; 3	IRP; 3	ROA; 1; 1*	ROA; 2; 10	MOH; 1; 2	**MOH**; **2**; 17*	**MOH**; **3**; 1*	TOR; 1; 1	**TOR**; **2**; 2*	POR; 1; 3	POR; 2; 2	POR; 3; 1*	1st	447
2025	Sarah Fisher Hartman Racing	STP; 1	STP; 2	NOL; 1	NOL; 2	NOL; 3	IMS; 1; 6	IMS; 2; 5	IRP	ROA; 1	ROA; 2	MOH; 1	MOH; 2	MOH; 3	TOR; 1	TOR; 2	POR; 1	POR; 2	POR; 3	22nd	32

==== USF Pro 2000 Championship ====
(key) (Races in bold indicate pole position) (Races in italics indicate fastest lap) (Races with * indicate most race laps led)

Year	Team	1	2	3	4	5	6	7	8	9	10	11	12	13	14	15	16	17	18	Rank	Points
2024	Pabst Racing	STP; 1; 21	STP; 2; 11	LOU; 1; 10	LOU; 2; 3	LOU; 3; 4	IMS; 1; 7	IMS; 2; 15	IMS; 3; 1	IRP; 15	ROA; 1; 20	**ROA**; **2**; 17*	ROA; 3; 5	MOH; 1; 5	**MOH**; **2**; 8	TOR; 1; 1*	TOR; 2; 7	POR; 1; 2	POR; 2; 3	4th	272
