= Carolina Motorsports Park =

Race track in Kershaw, South Carolina

CMP
- Full Circuit (2008–present)
- Location: Kershaw, South Carolina
- Coordinates: 34°29′16″N 80°35′49″W
- Owner: Motorsports Capital LLC (June 2020–present); Joe Hooker & Bob Humphreys (July 1999–May 2020)
- Operator: Motorsports Capital LLC (November 2019–present)
- Broke ground: July 1998; 28 years ago
- Opened: July 1999; 27 years ago
- Architect: Alan Wilson
- Major events: Current: Atlantic Championship (2026); USF Juniors (2026); F2000 Championship Series (2021–2022, 2026); 24 Hours of Lemons (2015–2020, 2023–present); Former: ChampCar Endurance Series (2021–2023, 2025); Formula Lites (2015)
- Website: https://carolinamotorsportspark.com/

Full Circuit (2008–present)
- Length: 2.279 mi (3.668 km)
- Turns: 14
- Race lap record: 1:22.529 ( (United States) Harbir Dass, Swift 016.a, 2026, F-Atlantic)

East Circuit (1999–present)
- Length: 1.247 mi (2.007 km)
- Turns: 9

West Circuit (2008–present)
- Length: 0.986 mi (1.587 km)
- Turns: 7

Original Circuit (1999–present)
- Length: 2.235 mi (3.597 km)
- Turns: 14

The Carolina Motorsports Park is a 2.279 mi (3.668 km) race track located in Kershaw, in the state of South Carolina. It was opened in 1999, and designed by Alan Wilson who has designed more than 20 road courses, including Burt Brothers Motorpark, Barber Motorsports Park, Autobahn Country Club. The circuit has also 0.700 mi (1.127 km) kart-track.

The circuit has mainly hosted minor national championships such as National Auto Sport Association, Sports Car Club of America, 24 Hours of Lemons; but it also hosts major junior national championships like Atlantic Championship Series and USF Juniors.

== Events ==
Current

- April: USF Juniors, 24 Hours of Lemons, Gridlife
- May: National Auto Sport Association, Sports Car Club of America
- August: Atlantic Championship Series, F2000 Championship Series, F1600 Championship Series
- November: National Auto Sport Association

Former

- ChampCar Endurance Series (2021–2023, 2025)
- Formula Lites (2015)
- North American Formula 1000 Championship (2021–2022)

== Lap records ==
As of August 2026, the fastest official lap records at the Carolina Motorsports Park are listed as:

Category	Time	Driver	Vehicle	Event
Full Circuit (2008–present): 2.279 mi (3.668 km)
Formula Atlantic	1:22.529	Harbir Dass	Swift 016.a	2026 Kershaw Atlantic Championship round
Formula 1000	1:23.774	Alex Mayer	JDR F1000	2021 Kershaw North American F1000 round
F2000 Championship	1:26.838	Brandon Dixon	Citation F2000	2021 Kershaw F2000 Championship round
Formula Regional	1:29.750	Aiden Zelaya	Ligier JS F3	2026 Kershaw Atlantic Championship round
Formula Lites	1:31.031	Vinicius Papareli	Crawford FL15	2015 Kershaw Formula Lites round
USF Juniors	1:32.1007	Iván Machado Pérez	Tatuus JR-23	2026 Kershaw USF Juniors round
F1600 Championship	1:32.952	Ax Kametches	Mygale SJ 2012	2021 Kershaw F1600 Championship round
