= Borland Racing Developments =

Australian racing car manufacturer

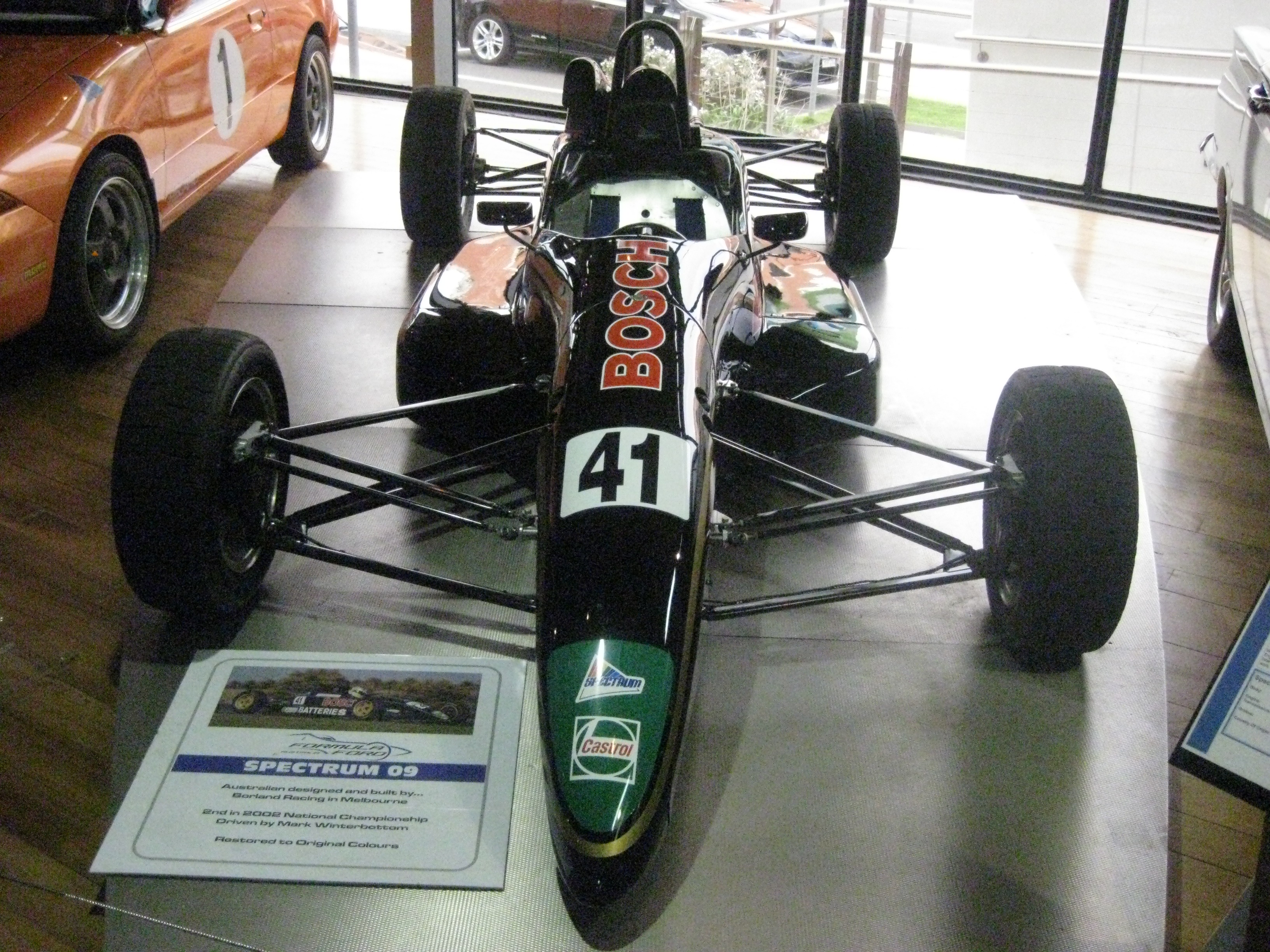
- The Spectrum 09 in which Mark Winterbottom placed 2nd in the 2002 Australian Formula Ford Championship
- Formation: 1984
- Purpose: Manufacturer of open-wheel racing cars
- Location: Australia

Borland Racing Developments is an Australian championship winning manufacturer of open-wheel racing cars, principally in the junior categories of Formula Ford and Formula Vee.

Borland Racing Developments was formed in 1984 to prepare and engineer cars for the Australian Formula 2 Championship. Four championships were secured in the next five years, after which Michael Borland turned his attention to producing the Spectrum Formula Ford and Sabre Formula Vee racing cars.

The Spectrum chassis established itself in the local Formula Ford market, taking a second for Jason Bargwanna in the 1996 title race. He gained a 1-2 in the 1998 Australian Championship for Adam Macrow and Christian Jones. The strength and popularity of the chassis grew with ongoing development and since 2004, the Spectrum has been the most consistently successful brand in Australian Formula Ford Championship racing.

In 2000, a New Zealand title to Phil Hellebrekers was the first international crown for the marque. In 2006 a Spectrum model 011 was built for the UK championship. On the Brands Hatch GP circuit, John Martin took a resounding victory in the chassis' debut weekend. This win was the impetus to appoint a UK agent in Mark Bailey Racing Ltd, which culminated in leading UK championship team Kevin Mills Racing switching to the Spectrum chassis for the 2008 season. With pole positions and race wins with KMR in 2008 and 2009, Spectrums are regular front runners in the UK championship.

BRD continues to develop a business as a specialist fabricator, meeting the demands of Daytona Sportscar production, historic restoration projects and production of specialty parts for the motor racing industry.

During 2007, the Braeside factory doubled in size to accommodate the existing workload and to provide capacity for new projects. Amongst the first of these projects were the Spectrum F2000 (the slicks and wings racer for the US market) and the Sabre 02 Formula Vee, 1600.

== Models ==
=== Spectrum Formula Ford ===
With both the UK and Australia adopting the Ford Duratec, 1600 cc motor (as used in the Ford Fiesta road cars) for Formula Ford competition from the 2006 season, it provided an opportune time to release the next evolution in the Spectrum line; the 011. Given how successful the 010 of 2004 and 2005 had been, the focus with the 011 was to fine-tune the chassis and suspension to maximise the benefits of the reduced weight and increased power from the new engine.

Success with the new model was immediate; John Martin won the inaugural Fiesta powered Formula Ford round on his way to the 2006 Australian title. During that season, BRD built a Spectrum 011 to the UK regulations and John delivered a victory at the Brands Hatch UKFFC round in the car's UK debut weekend. The 011 chassis dominated the Australian championship and continued to make its mark internationally.

As with all models since 2004, the new Spectrum included as standard lightweight components offered as expensive options on other chassis. The cars feature:

- Bespoke Penske adjustable dampers
- NMB aircraft quality rod ends and spherical bearings
- MoTeC SDL data logging system
- Motorsport quality wiring loom and electrical connectors
- Motorsport quality brake, fuel and oil lines and fittings
- FIA standard on board extinguisher, racing harness and fuel cell
- Fuel cell features internal motorsport collector for pick up as standard
- Mark Bailey Racing prepared Hewland LD200 gearbox

=== Spectrum FF1600 ===
All of the features of the Spectrum Formula Ford are available to the FF1600 racer. FF1600 cars are available to purchase new from the factory, or they can supply all of the components required to convert from Formula Ford.

BRD has been producing FF1600 cars since the 1980s, accumulating a string of race and championship wins at home and abroad. In 2009 Jesse Fenech won the Victorian State FF1600 Championship in a Spectrum 010b and Ben Norton drove the Wiltshire College Spectrum 011 to win the Castle Combe FF1600 Championship; arguably the two most competitive FF1600 Championships in the world at the time. Ben and the College also won the Castle Combe Carnival, becoming only the second driver to take the double in the same year.

=== Sabre Formula Vee ===
BRD sold 23 Sabre 01 Formula Vee racing cars between 1993 and 2000. Technical changes within the Formula Vee category and the demands of the rapidly growing Spectrum Formula Ford business placed the Sabre project on hold for a number of years.

By 2007, the Vee category had transitioned to the FV1600 regulations. New facilities and increased staffing levels enabled BRD to commence development of their second generation Vee, the Sabre 02, designed specifically for the FV1600 rules. The prototype was designed and built during 2008, before a thorough track testing program in 2009. With the car achieving lap record pace in testing, it was deemed production ready and the first orders were taken in late 2009.

The new Sabre took Formula Vee to the next level. The Sabre 02 shared many common components with the 2010 Spectrum 012 Formula Ford, including main body panels. The Sabre 02 also shared the Spectrum's debut success. In its first outing, Daniel Reinhardt drove the Junior Racing Developments team Sabre 02 to pole position, four from four race wins and a new lap record at Sandown International Raceway.

As with the Spectrum Formula Ford, the Sabre Formula Vee is built with components that include:

- Bespoke Penske adjustable dampers
- NMB aircraft quality rod ends and spherical bearings
- MoTeC SDL data logging system
- Motorsport quality wiring loom and electrical connectors
- Motorsport quality brake, fuel and oil lines and fittings

== Cars ==
| Year | Car | Engine | Class | Region |
|---|---|---|---|---|
| 1993 | Sabre 01 | Volkswagen 1200cc | Formula Vee Australia | Australia |
| 1995 | Spectrum 05 | Ford Kent 1600cc | Australian Formula Ford Championship | Australia |
| 1997 | Spectrum 06 | Ford Kent 1600cc | Australian Formula Ford Championship | Australia |
| 1999 | Spectrum 07 | Ford Kent 1600cc | Australian Formula Ford Championship | Australia |
| 2001 | Daytona Sportscar | LS1 Gen. III 6000cc | Grand tourer | |
| 2002 | Spectrum 09 | Ford Kent 1600cc | Australian Formula Ford Championship | Australia |
| 2004 | Spectrum 010 | Ford Kent 1600cc | Australian Formula Ford Championship | Australia |
| 2006 | Spectrum 011 | Ford Duratec 1600cc | Australian Formula Ford Championship | Australia |
| 2006 | Spectrum 011 | Honda L15A7 1500cc | F1600 Championship Series | United States |
| 2010 | Spectrum 012 | Ford Duratec 1600cc | Australian Formula Ford Championship | Australia |
| 2010 | Spectrum 012 | Honda L15A7 1500cc | F1600 Championship Series | United States |
| 2010 | Sabre 02 | Volkswagen 1600cc | Australian Formula Vee | Australia |
| 2012 | Spectrum 014 | Ford Duratec 1600cc | Australian Formula Ford Championship | Australia |
| 2012 | Spectrum 014 | Honda L15A7 1500cc | F1600 Championship Series | United States |
| 2014 | Spectrum 014z | Ford Zetec 2000cc | F2000 Championship Series | United States |
| 2016 | Formula Thunder 5000 | Ford Coyote 5000cc | Australian S5000 Championship (Prototype) | Australia |
| 2017 | Spectrum 015 | Ford Duratec 1600cc | Australian Formula Ford Championship | Australia |
