= F1600 Championship Series =

Motor racing series

- Category: Open wheeled
- Country: United States
- Inaugural season: 2011
- Constructors: Van Diemen, Piper, Mygale, Swift, Spectrum, Citation
- Engine suppliers: Ford Kent; Honda L15A7
- Tyre suppliers: H
- Drivers' champion: (Canada) Boss Patel
- Teams' champion: Brian Graham Racing
- Official website: F1600 Championship Series

The F1600 Championship Series was created by the SCCA in 2011. The series is organized by Formula Race Promotions, the same organization which organizes the F2000 Championship Series, and sanctioned by SCCA Pro Racing. From 2016 to 2018, its highest-placed driver between the age of 14 and 25 was invited to the Road to Indy Shootout.

== The Series ==
The class uses the Sports Car Club of America regulations for the Ford Kent engine-based Formula Ford regulations, which includes the option of either the Ford Kent or Honda L15A7 engine. Therefore, many drivers from the local club racing scene make their appearance in the national series.

=== 2011 Season ===
The first year saw many club racers and well established constructors racing in the series. Most cars were Van Diemen, Piper or Swift. Cape Motorsports began a collaboration with the Australian constructor Spectrum. Spectrum had already many years of Formula Ford experience in Australia. This also saw the introduction of Australian driver Mitch Martin who raced 2 races and scored a pole position and 2 second-place finishes. Volkswagen Jetta Cup graduate Wyatt Gooden made four appearances and scored 4 wins, this placed him sixth in the championship. Gooden went on to race in the F2000 Championship Series and USF2000. Bill Valet, who went on to win the inaugural championship, scored two wins but with seven podium finishes he outscored Tim Kautz (second) and Jim Goughary, Jr. (third).

=== 2012 Season ===
2012 saw the addition of Bryan Herta Autosport with drivers Brandon Newey and Canadian Garett Grist. Bryan Herta Autosport became the official importer of Mygale cars in the United States. This saw the introduction of the Mygale SJ12 in the F1600 Championship Series. Brandon Newey went on to win four races and score a second place in the championship. Cape Motorsports won the drivers championship with Finnish Formula Ford graduate Matias Köykkä. Köykkä won four races but due to more fastest race laps he won the championship over Newey. Australian Shae Davies, teammate of Köykkä, won three races out of six entries. A total of 46 drivers entered the 2012 season.

=== 2013 Season ===
Carbir was to return in Formula F as a constructor with a factory entry. The Carbir was to be driven by SCCA Formula Ford stand out Reid Hazelton but was unable to enter any races in 2013. It is assumed financial setbacks hampered the Carbir factory. The season starts 13 April.

2013 also sees the introduction of a 'Masters' class. The Masters class will be available for drivers that are 40 years old and up.

== Cars ==
All standard Formula Ford cars are allowed into the series. Due to rule changes in Formula Ford across Europe in early 2012 the F1600 Championship Series had to act. They acted in a way which allowed the Formula Ford Duratec car, when Ford Kent powered, into the series. Alongside the Van Diemen, Mygale and other cars there are also privately manufactured Formula Ford cars allowed like the 'Wiver'. In addition, both the Ford and Honda engines that are legal in SCCA competition are permitted in this series.

Engine comparison
	Ford 1600 GT Kent	Honda HPD L15A7 Fit
Engine Type	inline 4-cylinder	Production-based inline 4-cylinder
Displacement	1,598cc	1.5 L (91.3 cubic inches)
Valvetrain	Overhead valve	Single overhead camshaft, 4 valves per cylinder i-VTEC
Crankshaft	Cast iron	Steel alloy 5 main bearings
Pistons	Forged aluminium alloy	Cast aluminium alloy
Connecting rods	Forged steel alloy	Forged steel alloy
Engine management		HPD
Ignition system		Digital inductive
Lubrication	Dry sump	Dry sump
Cooling	Water cooled	Single mechanical water pump
Transmission	4-speed manual	4-speed manual
Fuel	Gasoline	91 octane unleaded
Weight		215 lbs (97.5 kg)

== Champions ==
Season	Driver	Team	Car	Engine
2011	(United States) Bill Valet	Valet Racing	Swift DB6	Ford
2012	(Finland) Matias Köykkä	Cape Motorsports w/ Wayne Taylor Racing	Spectrum 011	Honda
2013	(United States) Jake Eidson	Cape Motorsports w/ Wayne Taylor Racing	Spectrum 012	Honda
2014	(Norway) Ayla Ågren	Team Pelfrey	Mygale	Honda
2015	(Australia) Scott Andrews	Exclusive Autosport	Spectrum 014H	Honda
2016	(United States) Neil Verhagen	K-Hill Motorsports	Mygale	Honda
2017	(United States) Matthew Cowley	Team Pelfrey	Mygale	Honda
2018	(United States) Dario Cangialosi	K-Hill Motorsports	Mygale	Honda
2019	(United States) Jonathan Kotyk	K-Hill Motorsports	Mygale	Honda
2020	(United States) Simon Sikes	Rice Race Prep	Mygale	Honda
2021	(United States) Nicholas d'Orlando	Team Pelfrey	Mygale	Honda
2022	(United States) Thomas Schrage	Rice Race Prep	Mygale	Honda
2023	(United States) Porter Aiken	Aiken Racing	2009 Piper DF05	Honda
2024	(United States) Mateo Naranjo	Team Pelfrey	Mygale	Honda
2025	(United States) Ayrton Cahan	Eric Langbein Racing	2009 Piper DF05	Honda
2026	(Canada) Boss Patel	Brian Graham Racing	2014 Piper DL7	Honda
