= Autobahn Country Club =

US auto racing road course

Autobahn Circuit
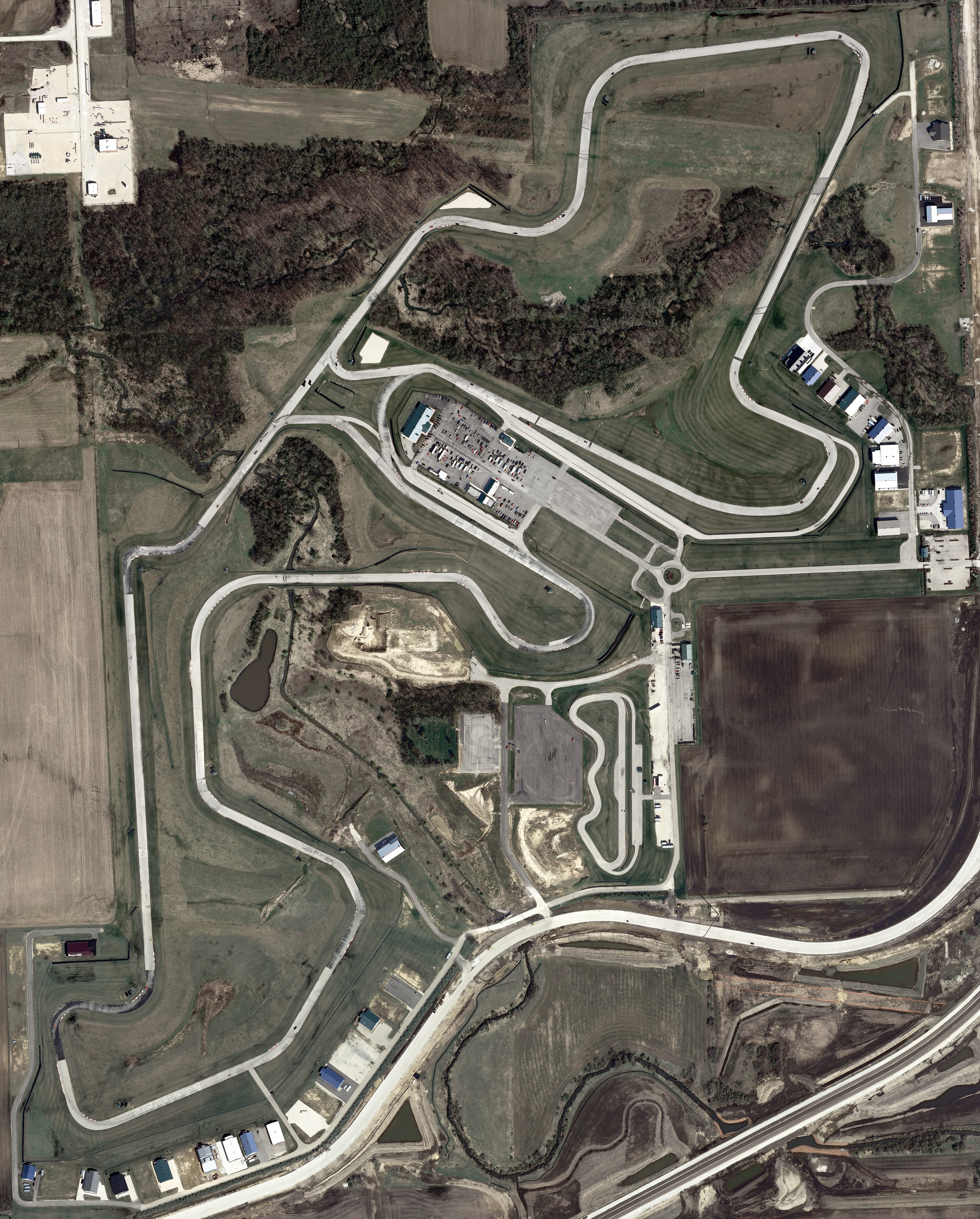
- 2010 orthophoto
- Location: 3795 CenterPoint Way, Joliet, Illinois 60436 815-722-2223
- Coordinates: 41°27′17″N 088°07′38″W
- Opened: October 2004; 21 years ago
- Architect: Alan Wilson
- Major events: Former: Atlantic Championship (2009, 2021); Trans-Am Series (2010); Star Mazda Championship (2009–2010); U.S. F2000 National Championship (2010); Global MX-5 Cup (2009–2010); Speed World Challenge (2009); IMSA GT3 Cup Challenge (2009)

Full Circuit (2004–present)
- Surface: Asphalt
- Length: 5.729 km (3.560 mi)
- Turns: 19
- Race lap record: 2:05.542 ( (United States) John Edwards, Swift 016.a, 2009, Formula Atlantic)

North Circuit (2004–present)
- Surface: Asphalt
- Length: 2.350 km (1.460 mi)
- Turns: 9

South Circuit (2004–present)
- Surface: Asphalt
- Length: 3.380 km (2.100 mi)
- Turns: 15
- Race lap record: 1:13.408 ( (United States) Keith Grant, Swift 016.a, 2021, Formula Atlantic)

Autobahn Country Club is an auto racing road course located in Joliet, Illinois, operated as a country club, while also hosting many outside events. Autobahn was the first purpose-built motorsports country club in the United States, and has inspired several others. The club has a sanctioning body called Autobahn Member Racing, which hosts series for Spec Miatas, GT cars, karts, Radical Sportscars, a discipline called Chase Racing similar to bracket racing, open wheel cars, as well as competitions for rallycross and autocross. As of the 2025 race season, the club requires a $50,000 membership initiation fee. Annual dues is $6600. Membership includes unlimited access to the tracks six days a week in season (April - October), use of the Member Clubhouse, which contains a bar and 40,000 sq. ft. event space. Members can purchase land to build garages and personal condos. A Social/Karting Membership is $5700 and includes all Member Social Events and unlimited access to the go-kart track at Kart Circuit Autobahn, during member hours. Notable members include legendary racers Bobby Rahal, Graham Rahal, David Heinemeier Hansson, Cooper MacNeil, Jay Howard, Peter Dempsey, and Tom Bagley. Many members use the club to drive their exotic and classic cars.

The facility is available for rent by private groups. It hosts events for various organizations including the SCCA, NASA, Gridlife, Midwestern Council, PCA, One Lap of America, and various marque and track day clubs. Many manufacturers also rent the facility for marketing events.

== The tracks and facilities ==
The Autobahn full track is 3.560 mi (5.729 km) in distance. The facility includes a configurable main track with a 1.460 mi (2.350 km) north track, a 2.100 mi (3.380 km) south track, a full track of 3.560 mi (5.729 km), skid pad, and a 0.520 mi (0.837 km) kart track. The full track can be split into two smaller tracks. Autobahn Country Club also offers a skidpad for the teen driving academy and drifting. The kart track is also open to the public on weekdays. The club has a fleet of performance cars for members to drive on track at reduced speeds.

== Businesses in paddock ==
Along with private garages and condos, various performance shops and race headquarters are located on the Autobahn campus. Some of these include Eurosport Racing, Team Stradale, Havoc Motorsport, Turn 3 Motorsport, and many other businesses available for onsite service.

== Lap records ==
As of September 2021, the fastest official race lap records at Autobahn Country Club for different classes are listed as:

Category	Time	Driver	Vehicle	Event
Full Circuit (2004–present): 3.560 mi (5.729 km)
Formula Atlantic	2:05.542	John Edwards	Swift 016.a	2009 Joliet Atlantic Championship round
Star Mazda	2:13.299	Conor Daly	Star Formula Mazda 'Pro'	2010 Joliet Star Mazda Championship round
US F2000	2:17.051	Patrick McKenna	Élan DP08	2010 Joliet US F2000 round
Trans-Am	2:21.137	R. J. López	Chevrolet Corvette Trans-Am	2010 Joliet Trans-Am round
South Circuit (2004–present): 2.100 mi (3.380 km)
Formula Atlantic	1:13.408	Keith Grant	Swift 016.a	2021 Joliet Atlantic Championship round
Formula 2000	1:18.024	Nathan Byrd	Van Diemen F2000	2021 Joliet F2000 Championship round
Formula 1600	1:26.227	Thomas Schrage	Mygale SJ 2012	2021 Joliet F1600 Championship round
