= F1000 =

F1000 may refer to:

== Racing ==
- F1000, a one-make open-wheel circuit racing series in the United Kingdom run by the 750 Motor Club
- Formula 1000, a 1-L (1000-cc) open-wheel open-cockpit single-seater motorsports car racing category
  - Australian Formula 1000
  - North American Formula 1000 Championship
- 2019 Chinese Grand Prix of Formula One; the 1000th Grands Prix of the World Driving Championship, with the special logo "F1000"
- 2020 Tuscan Grand Prix of Formula One, at Mugello, Italy; the 1000th Grands Prix for Scuderia Ferrari; the F1000 GP

== Vehicles ==
- DKW F1000 L, a panel van light commercial vehicle
- Ford F-1000, a pickup truck, part of the Ford F-Series (fifth generation)
- Farman F.1000, an airplane

== Other uses ==
- F1000 (publisher), a science publisher, and publisher of services for life scientists and clinical researchers
- HP F1000A, an MS-DOS based palmtop pocket PC

== See also ==
- Ferrari SF1000 (Scuderia Ferrari 1000), the F1 racecar for Ferarri's 1000th Grands Prix and 2020 season
- 1000 (disambiguation)
- F100 (disambiguation)
- F10 (disambiguation)
- F1 (disambiguation)
- F (disambiguation)
