= Bonanno =

Bonanno is an Italian surname derived from a medieval given name meaning 'good year'. Notable people with the surname include:

- Bonanno crime family, a Mafia family in New York City
  - Joseph Bonanno (1905–2002), founder
  - Salvatore Bonanno (1932–2008), son of Joseph
- Alfio Bonanno (born 1976), Australian-Italian tenor, songwriter, musician and composer
- Alfredo M. Bonanno (1937–2023), Italian anarchist
- Anthony Bonanno, Maltese archeologist
- Benny Bonanno (born c. 1951), American politician
- Bert Bonanno, American track and field coach and sports administrator
- George Bonanno, American clinical psychologist and pioneer of bereavement research
- Giovanna Bonanno (c. 1713–1789), Italian alleged witch and poisoner
- Giovanni Bonanno (born 1968), Italian racing driver
- Joseph A. Bonanno, American optometrist
- Kathleen Sheeder Bonanno (1956–2017), American poet, teacher, and contributing editor to The American Poetry Review
- Margaret Wander Bonanno (1950–2021), American science fiction author
- Mark Bonanno, Australian comedian
- Mike Bonanno (born 1968), American multimedia artist, leading member of The Yes Men
- Nicholas Bonanno (1927–2002), American trade unionist
- Nicolás Bonanno (born 1991), Argentine handball player
- Rinaldo Bonanno (1545–1600), Italian sculptor
- Robin Bonanno (born 1962), American race car driver

== See also ==
- Bonanno Pisano (fl. 1170s–1180s), Italian sculptor
- Bonanno: A Godfather's Story, a 1999 biopic based on the memoirs of Joseph and Bill Bonanno
- Bonanno catheter, a medical device
- Buonanno
- Bonano
- Bonnano
- Bonanni
