= 2014 CAMS WA AUS F1000 Championship =

The 2014 CAMS WA AUS F1000 Championship was a CAMS sanctioned Australian state motor racing title for drivers of Formula 1000 racing cars. It was the first state series for Formula 1000s to be held in Australia. The championship was contested over five round series which began on 26 April at Barbagallo Raceway and ended on 21 September at the same track. It was won by Stewart Burns, driving a Speads JKS 01.

== Teams and drivers ==
The following teams and drivers contested the 2014 CAMS WA AUS F1000 Championship. Each car was powered by a 1000cc motorcycle engine, as mandated by the category regulations.

Team	Chassis	No	Driver
2nd wind Sailboards	Firman 1000	2	(Australia) Jez Hammond
Ribuck Industries	Speads JKS 01	3	(Australia) Stewart Burns
Fleetcare	Stohr	4	(Australia) Leanne Tander
Fleetcare	Stohr	4	(Australia) Daniel Gate
Tony Rova	Speads RM 08 F1000	5	(Australia) Daniel Gate
Tony Rova	Speads RM 08 F1000	5	(Australia) Tony Rova
AP Racing Stohr	Stohr F1000	8	(Australia) Adam Proctor
	Speads RM03	11	(Australia) Bruce Allen
Tow It Trailers	Stohr F1000	98	(Australia) Ben Riley

== Calendar ==
The championship was contested over a four round series, with three races at each round, all of which were held at Barbagallo Raceway. A fifth round to be held in June was cancelled.

Round	Date	Round winner	Car
1	26 April	Ben Riley	Stohr F1000
2	7 June	Cancelled	
3	13 July	Ben Riley	Stohr F1000
4	31 August	Leanne Tander	Stohr
5	21 September	Daniel Gate	Stohr

== Points system ==
Championship points were awarded on a 25-20-18-17-16 basis to the top five classified finishers in each race. The results for each round of the Series were determined by the number of points scored by each driver at that round. The driver gaining the highest points total over the five rounds was declared the winner of the Championship.

== Results ==
Pos	Driver	Round 1			Round 3			Round 4			Round 5			Pts
1	(Australia) Stewart Burns	2	2	2	2	2	2	5	4	5	1	2	3	232
2	(Australia) Ben Riley	1	1	1	1	1	1	3	DNS	DNS	Ret	3	2	206
3	(Australia) Daniel Gate	Ret	DNS	DNS	3	3	3	Ret	DNS	DNS	2	1	1	124
4	(Australia) Bruce Allen	3	3	3				4	3	3				107
5	(Australia) Leanne Tander							1	2	1				68
6	(Australia) Adam Proctor							2	1	2				61
7	(Australia) Jez Hammond	DNS	DNS	DNS	DNS	DNS	DNS	DNS	Ret	4	DNS	DNS	4	34
8	(Australia) Tony Rova										DNS	DNS	5	16
Pos	Driver	Round 1			Round 3			Round 4			Round 5			Pts

Colour	Result
Gold	Winner
Silver	Second place
Bronze	Third place
Green	Points finish
Blue	Non-points finish
Blue	Non-classified finish (NC)
Purple	Retired (Ret)
Red	Did not qualify (DNQ)
Red	Did not pre-qualify (DNPQ)
Black	Disqualified (DSQ)
White	Did not start (DNS)
White	Withdrew (WD)
White	Race cancelled (C)
Blank	Did not practice (DNP)
Blank	Did not arrive (DNA)
Blank	Excluded (EX)
