= Bonano =

Bonanno is a surname. Notable people with the surname include:

- José Rosario Bonano (born 1956), Honduran politician
- Roberto Bonano (born 1970), Argentine footballer
- Sharkey Bonano (1904–1972), American jazz trumpeter and singer

== See also ==
- Estadio José "Pepito" Bonano, Guaynabo, Puerto Rico
- Bonanos
- Buonanno
- Bonanno
- Bonnano
