= 2022 North American Formula 1000 Championship =

6th season of the North American Formula 1000 Championship

2022 F1000 season

Season
- Races: 14
- Start date: April 1
- End date: October 16

Awards
- Drivers' champion: (United States) Nathan Byrd
- Manufacturers' Cup: (United States) JDR

The 2022 North American Formula 1000 Championship presented by EPC is the sixth season of the North American Formula 1000 Championship. The sixteen round season began on April 1 at Carolina Motorsports Park, and ended on October 16 at Pittsburgh International Race Complex.

Last year's champion, Alex Mayer, became a five-time champion in the series. Mayer has won every season since the series' launch. Mayer did not contest the championship this year. The championship was won by Nathan Byrd.

== Drivers and teams ==
Team	No.	Drivers	Rounds	Chassis
(United States) Area 81 Racing	81	(United States) Tim Pierce	1–2	JDR
(United States) Arrive Drive Motorsports	39	(United States) Nathan Byrd	1–8, 13–14	JDR
(United States) Arrive Drive Motorsports	99	(United States) Tommy Cadwalder R	1–4	JDR
(United States) BJF Motorsports	33	(United States) Charles Livingston	1–4	JDR
(United States) Hamilton Motorsports	93	(United States) Steve Hamilton	3–4	JDR
(United States) Hedrick Speedsports	22	(United States) Ben Hedrick R	1–2	Firman
(United States) Mantac Motorsports	12	(United States) Reilly Harris	3–4	Van Diemen
(United States) Momentum Motorsports	13	(United States) Doug Hertz	1–4	Firman
(United States) Prieto Performance	43	(United States) Shane Prieto	1–2	Firman
	9	(United States) Glenn Cooper	1–2	Nova-Dieman

R Eligible for Rookie of the Year

== Schedule ==
Rd.	Date	Track	Location
1	April 1–3	Carolina Motorsports Park	Kershaw, South Carolina
2	April 1–3	Carolina Motorsports Park	Kershaw, South Carolina
3	April 29–May 1	Mid-Ohio Sports Car Course	Lexington, Ohio
4	April 29–May 1	Mid-Ohio Sports Car Course	Lexington, Ohio
5	May 20–22	Barber Motorsports Park	Birmingham, Alabama
6	May 20–22	Barber Motorsports Park	Birmingham, Alabama
7	June 3–5	Pittsburgh International Race Complex	Wampum, Pennsylvania
8	June 3–5	Pittsburgh International Race Complex	Wampum, Pennsylvania
9	July 8–10	Autobahn Country Club	Joliet, Illinois
10	July 8–10	Autobahn Country Club	Joliet, Illinois
11	August 19–21	Summit Point Motorsports Park	Summit Point, West Virginia
12	August 19–21	Summit Point Motorsports Park	Summit Point, West Virginia
13	October 14–16	Pittsburgh International Race Complex	Wampum, Pennsylvania
14	October 14–16	Pittsburgh International Race Complex	Wampum, Pennsylvania

== Driver standings ==
Pos	Driver	CMP		MO	BAR	PITT	ABCC	SP		PITT	Pts
1	(United States) Nathan Byrd	1	1								259
2	(United States) Steve Hamilton	3	3					3	2		201
3	(United States) Tommy Cadwalader R	5	5					4	4		190
4	(United States) Shane Prieto	2	2					1	1		126
5	(United States) Tim Pierce	DNF	4					2	3		94
6	(United States) Doug Hertz	4	6								31
7	(United States) Rhys Myers							5	5		34
8	(United States) Jason Slahor							DNS	DNF		33
9	(United States) Charles Livingston							DNF	DNS		33
10	(United States) Ben Hedrick R	6	DNS								15
Pos	Driver	CMP		MO	BAR	PITT	ABCC	SP		PITT	Pts

Color	Result
Gold	Winner
Silver	2nd-place finish
Bronze	3rd-place finish
Green	Top 5 finish
Light Blue	Top 10 finish
Dark Blue	Other flagged position
Purple	Did not finish
Red	Did not qualify (DNQ)
Brown	Withdrew (Wth)
Black	Disqualified (DSQ)
White	Did Not Start (DNS)
White	Race abandoned (C)
Blank	Did not participate

== See also ==
- North American Formula 1000 Championship
