= 2021 North American Formula 1000 Championship =

5th season of the North American Formula 1000 Championship

2021 F1000 season

Season
- Races: 24
- Start date: April 1
- End date: October 17

Awards
- Drivers' champion: Alex Mayer
- Manufacturers' Cup: JDR
- Rookie of the Year: Nathan Byrd

The 2021 North American Formula 1000 Championship presented by EPC is the fifth season of the North American Formula 1000 Championship. The sixteen round season begins on April 1 at Carolina Motorsports Park, and ends on October 17 at Pittsburgh International Race Complex.

Last year's champion, Alex Mayer, became a four-time champion in the series, winning every season since the series' conception. Mayer was able to win another championship earning his fifth championship.

== Drivers and teams ==
Team	No.	Drivers	Rounds	Chassis
(United States) Area 81 Racing	81	(United States) Tim Pierce	1–8, 10–16	JDR
(United States) Arrive Drive Motorsports	39	(United States) Nathan Byrd R	1–2, 5–10	JDR
(United States) Arrive Drive Motorsports	99	(United States) Tommy Cadwalder R	4, 7–10	JDR
(United States) BJF Motorsports	33	(United States) Charles Livingston	1–2, 5–6, 9–10	JDR
(United States) Hamilton Motorsports	93	(United States) Steve Hamilton	All	JDR
(United States) Mantac Motorsports	12	(United States) Reilly Harris	All	Van Diemen
(United States) Mantac Motorsports	31	(United States) John Wilhelmi R	3–4, 9–10	Firman
(United States) Mayer Motorsports	77	(United States) Alex Mayer	All	JDR
(United States) Momentum Motorsports	13	(United States) Doug Hertz	1–2, 7–10	Firman
(United States) Prieto Performance	43	(United States) Shane Prieto	1–8, 10–16	Firman
(United States) Slahor Racing	19	(United States) Jason Slahor	1–2	Citation
(United States) Vardis Motorsports	00	(United States) Nicho Vardis	3–4, 7–8	JDR
(United States) 2 Veloce Racing	70	(United States) Rhys Meyers	1–2, 7–8	JDR
	9	(United States) Cooper Glenn	7–10	Nova-Dieman
	94	(United States) Joel Haas	1–2	Piper

R Eligible for Rookie of the Year

== Schedule ==
Rd.	Date	Track	Location
1	April 1–3	Carolina Motorsports Park	Kershaw, South Carolina
2	April 1–3	Carolina Motorsports Park	Kershaw, South Carolina
3	April 30 - May 2	Mid-Ohio Sports Car Course	Lexington, Ohio
4	April 30 - May 2	Mid-Ohio Sports Car Course	Lexington, Ohio
5	May 20–23	Barber Motorsports Park	Birmingham, Alabama
6	May 20–23	Barber Motorsports Park	Birmingham, Alabama
7	June 18–20	Pittsburgh International Race Complex	Wampum, Pennsylvania
8	June 18–20	Pittsburgh International Race Complex	Wampum, Pennsylvania
9	July 30 - August 1	Road America	Elkhart Lake, Wisconsin
10	July 30 - August 1	Road America	Elkhart Lake, Wisconsin
11	August 20–22	Summit Point Motorsports Park	Summit Point, West Virginia
12	August 20–22	Summit Point Motorsports Park	Summit Point, West Virginia
13	September 10–12	Autobahn Country Club	Joliet, Illinois
14	September 10–12	Autobahn Country Club	Joliet, Illinois
15	October 15–17	Pittsburgh International Race Complex	Wampum, Pennsylvania
16	October 15–17	Pittsburgh International Race Complex	Wampum, Pennsylvania

== Driver Standings ==
Pos	Driver	CMP		MO		BAR		PITT		RA		SP		ABCC		PITT		Pts
1	(United States) Alex Mayer	1	1	1	1	1	4	4	1	1	1	1	1			2	2	309
2	(United States) Tim Pierce	3	3	6	4	5	3	3	3			3	5			3	4	216
3	(United States) Steve Hamilton	4	5	5	6	4	5	7	4	4	2			3	3	4	DNF	214
4	(United States) Shane Prieto	2	2	3	2	2	1	5	DNF					1	1			208
5	(United States) Nathan Byrd R	9	4			3	2	8	2	DNF	4			2	4		1	207
6	(United States) Doug Hertz	6	10					9	DNF	3	5	2	2	DNF	2	5	7	176
7	(United States) Reilly Harris	10	6	4	3			2	7	2	3			5	DNS			154
8	(United States) Charles Livingston	5	9			6	DNF			5	6	6	4	4	5			154
9	(United States) Nicho Vardis			2	8			1	5							1	3	123
10	(United States) Rhys Meyers	11	8					6	6			4	6			7	6	116
11	(United States) Jason Slahor	7	7									5	3			6	5	95
12	(United States) John Wilhelmi R			7	7													28
13	(United States) Joel Haas	8	11															24
14	(United States) Tommy Cadwalder R				5													16
15	(United States) Glenn Cooper R												DNF					14
Pos	Driver	CMP		MO		BAR		PITT		RA		SP		ABCC		PITT		Pts

Color	Result
Gold	Winner
Silver	2nd-place finish
Bronze	3rd-place finish
Green	Top 5 finish
Light Blue	Top 10 finish
Dark Blue	Other flagged position
Purple	Did not finish
Red	Did not qualify (DNQ)
Brown	Withdrew (Wth)
Black	Disqualified (DSQ)
White	Did Not Start (DNS)
White	Race abandoned (C)
Blank	Did not participate

== See also ==
- North American Formula 1000 Championship
