= North American Formula 1000 Championship =

Motor racing tournament

- Category: Open wheeled
- Country: United States
- Inaugural season: 2013
- Constructors: Van Diemen, Piper, Citation, Firman Race Cars, JDR Motorsport
- Engine suppliers: Motorcycle-based 4-cycle up to 1000cc
- Tyre suppliers: Hoosier H
- Official website: North American Formula 1000 Championship

The North American Formula 1000 Championship is a motor racing series based on SCCA's open wheel Formula 1000 rules. It was founded in 2017 after the US Formula 1000 Championship ended in 2016. It serves somewhat as a successor to all the previous F1000 championships as all of those who were involved in its inception were part of either organizing or participating in all of the previous F1000 championships.

== Series ==
The North American Formula 1000 Championship began in 2017 as a series running within the SCCA Formula B (FB) class at SCCA Majors races at select venues located primarily in the Eastern United States. The first North American Formula 1000 Championship race was held at Road Atlanta in March 2017. It continued with this format in 2018 until the SCCA merged the Formula B (FB) class into its Formula Atlantic (FA) class in 2019.

Beginning in 2019 The North American Formula 1000 Championship has run the series with Formula Race Promotions https://www.formularacepromotions.com/. It has continued to run with Formula Race Promotions in both 2020 and 2021.

== History ==
Formula 1000 in the SCCA

The Sports Car Club of America (SCCA) created the Formula 1000 (otherwise known as FB or Formula B) class in 2007 as part of its Club Racing program. The SCCA immediately granted the class national status, allowing Formula 1000 to participate in all national club races with the exception the SCCA National Championship Runoffs.

To be able to compete as a class (FB) in the SCCA National Championship Runoffs, the class was required to have an average of 2.5 entries per national race. The class achieved that in 2009 and was invited to the National Championship Runoffs for the first time in 2010.

In May 2018 the SCCA suddenly and without warning or notice to the SCCA membership came out with a Car Count Criteria which specified how many Major (national) race entries each racing car class needed to maintain its National Championship Runoffs status. This Car Count Criteria was also backdated by more than a year to Jan 2017. As most F1000 (FB) drivers were competing in SCCA regional race events (which at the time was a route to the National Runoffs) as part of the North American F1000 Championship there was no opportunity to raise the Major race entry numbers in time by the end of 2018 to maintain SCCA National Runoffs status for F1000 (FB). As a result of this F1000 (FB) lost its National Runoffs status and many F1000 (FB) competitors decided to leave SCCA club racing entirely and compete with the North American F1000 Championship after it left SCCA Club Racing to compete as part of the Formula Race Promotions group. The last year F1000 (FB) competed as a class at the SCCA National Championship was in 2019 when 1 (one) car showed up.

F1000 (FB) was later merged into the Formula Atlantic (FA) class in 2020. F1000 currently runs in the SCCA FA class under the F1000 rules as stated in the December 2019 SCCA GCR (General Competition Rules).

Formula 1000 Race Series

In 2007, the Formula 1000 National Championship was created to increase interest in the class and build entries. In 2007 and 2008, the Formula 10000 National Championship was a single race, held during American Road Race of Champions at Road Atlanta. Justin Pritchard won the race both years in a Piper chassis.

In 2009, the Formula 1000 National Championship became more of a national championship in that it counted nationwide competitor participation in SCCA races as part of its series. This meant that all drivers throughout the US that scored points at their respective SCCA races could count those points toward the season-long Formula 1000 National championship. It used points earned in those events to determine an overall champion. Glenn Cooper won the first Formula 1000 National Championship in 2009.

In 2010, the West Coast-based F1000 Pro Series was formed with the participation of several F1000 manufacturers to help promote F1000 racing in the Western US. It was run in a similar manner to the F1000 National Championship as a series within a series, separate from SCCA FB but counting races within the SCCA as part of its series. It also organized and managed most of their events trackside at the actual venues, which included having their own separate podium and prize giving for F1000 competitors at each event that was separate from the SCCA. The first year consisted of a format of 15 selected races where drivers counted points earned from 10 of those races towards a drivers championship. It also had a Manufacturer's Cup for F1000 constructors and an end-of-season trophy for the top-scoring manufacturer. The series' first race was held at Phoenix Raceway in March 2010 and was won by Phil DeLao in a Phoenix Raceworks F1000. The Manufacturer's Cup in 2010 was won by Stohr Cars, who would go on to win the cup in 2011 and 2012 as well.

For 2011 the format was changed to ten races over five weekends at selected events (at SCCA national races) with points scored in all races. The series had a separate trophy and prize giving ceremony at every event. This format would be continued in 2012.

The US Formula 1000 Championship was created in 2013 when the F1000 Pro Series and the Formula 1000 National Championship joined to create a new national racing series for Formula 1000 cars. The series consisted of three championships in one. The US Formula 1000 Championship West, The US Formula 1000 Championship East, and an overall US Formula 1000 Championship.

The format for the US Formula 1000 championship called for each of the championship series (East and West) to run an equal number of events independently of each other as part of the SCCA SafeRacer national racing program, with points to be awarded based on in-class finishing positions at each event. Each series would crown a separate US Formula 1000 East and US Formula 1000 West Champion with an overall US Formula 1000 Champion decided at the SCCA National Runoffs. As in previous years it was run as a series within a series at SCCA Majors (national race) events.

The series first race was held as a joint East–West shootout event at the Circuit of the Americas in Austin, Texas on March 9, 2013, and was won by Lawrence Loshak in a JDR F1000. It was followed by a second race the next day which was won by Jose Gerardo in a Stohr. The US Formula 1000 Championship also conducted the first standing start ever in SCCA Club Racing in a race at Portland Raceway in July 2014 when it was granted its own run group during the event by the organizers. It was followed by two other standing starts, one later in the year at Pacific Raceway and another the following year at Road Atlanta. The US Formula 1000 Championship continued to run until the end of 2016.

== Cars ==
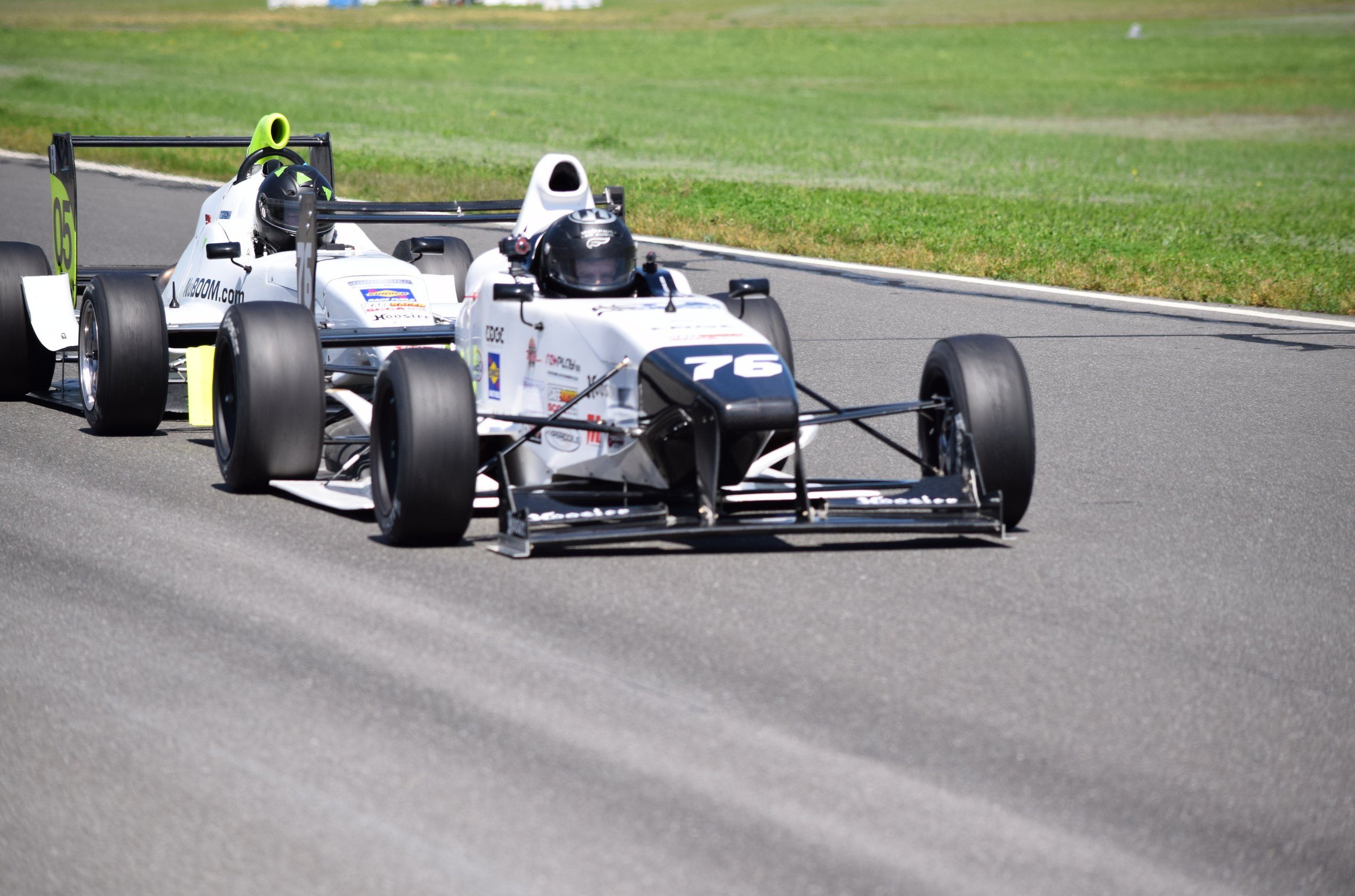

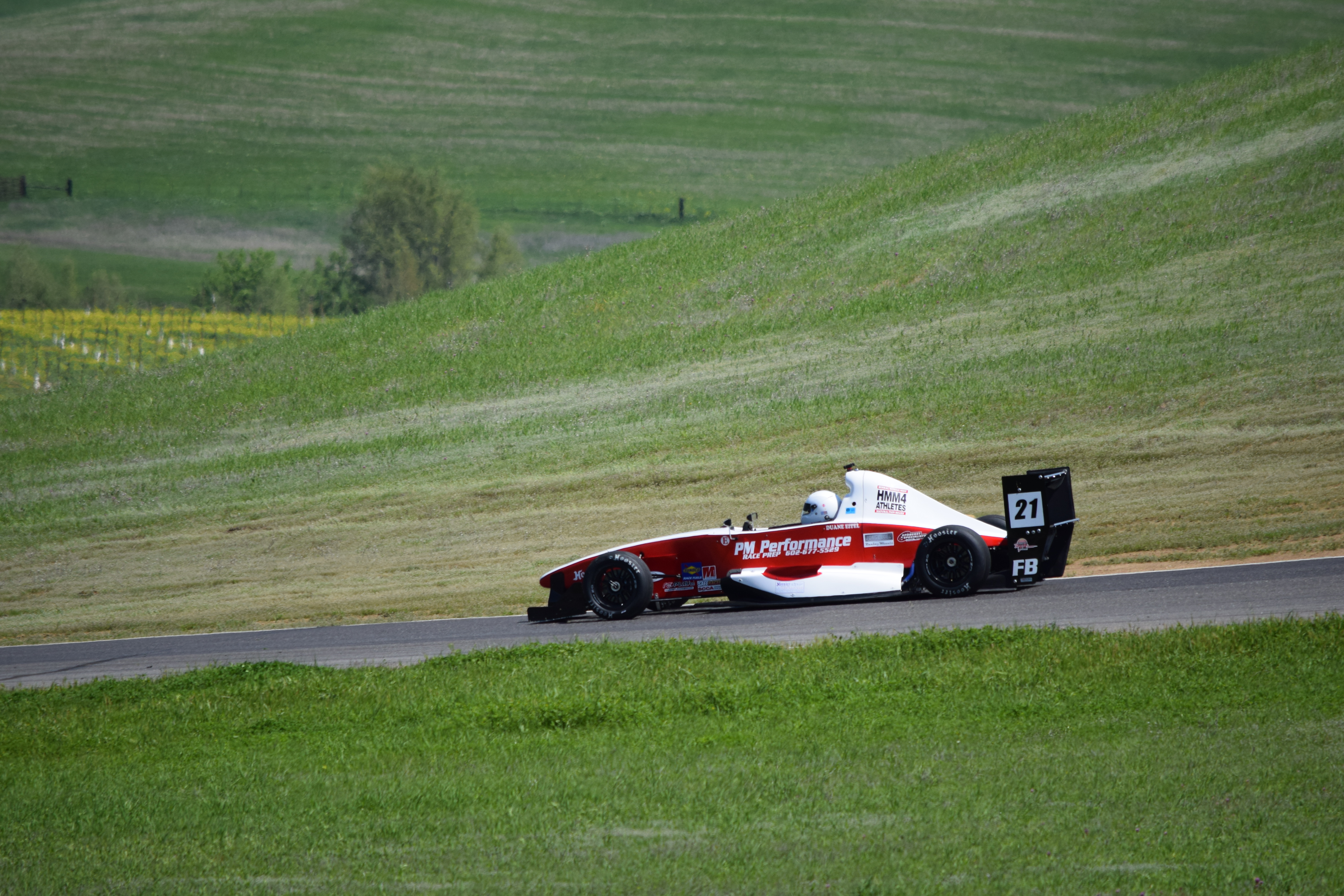

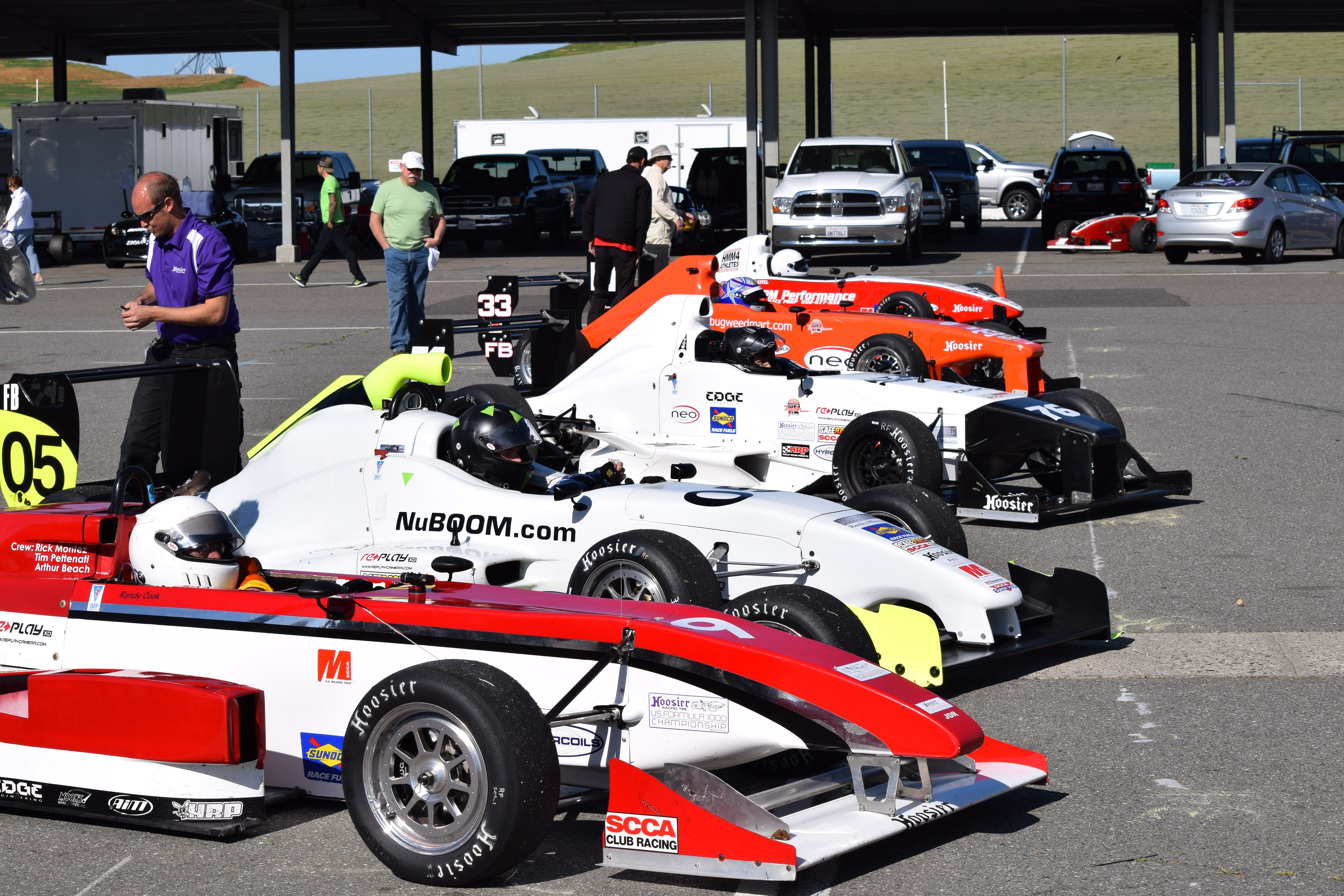

The SCCA General Competition Rules define the Formula 1000 car as follows: "A formula for purpose built, open-wheel, open cockpit racing cars. F1000 allows converted Formula Continental, Formula 2000, Formula F, and purpose-built motorcycle-powered tube frame chassis."

With more than 13 manufacturers, Formula 1000 boast more manufacturers than other open-wheel formula class in the world. Manufacturers build purpose-built Formula 1000 cars as a rolling chassis or provide kits for converting Formula 2000 (F2000) cars into F1000. Most provide cars race ready complete with engine and data system package. Purpose-built manufacturers include Stohr, Firman, Phoenix, JDR, Astra, Speads, Philadelphia, Edge, and Elan. Manufacturers that convert existing Formula 2000 cars include Piper, Citation, and Novak, who convert the Van Dieman. Others provide modified upgrade designs for existing purpose built cars.

Formula 1000 is also one of the few open-wheel racing classes that allow paddle shifters. There are multiple manufacturers of paddle shifters in Formula 1000.

It is possible to use any 4-cycle motorcycle-based 1000 cc engine. Most popular is the Suzuki GSXR engine. But there are also cars with Honda, Kawasaki, BMW or Yamaha engine.

== Formula 1000 Champions ==
=== North American Formula 1000 Champions ===
	North American Formula 1000 Championship	
2017	(United States) Alex Mayer	JDR F1000
2018	(United States) Alex Mayer	JDR F1000
2019	(United States) Alex Mayer	JDR F1000
2020	(United States) Alex Mayer	JDR F1000
2021	(United States) Alex Mayer	JDR F1000
2022	(United States) Nathan Byrd	JDR F1000

== Previous Formula 1000 Champions ==
- NOTE: 2019 SCCA National Championship Runoffs had only one entry as many boycotted the SCCA after they merged FB into FA class

	F1000 National Championship		F1000 Pro Series		SCCA National Championship Runoffs	
Year	Driver	Car	Driver	Car	Driver	Car
2007	(United Kingdom) Justin Pritchard	Piper DF5				
2008	(United Kingdom) Justin Pritchard	Piper DF5				
2009	(United States) Glenn Cooper	Van Diemen/Novak RF99				
2010	(United States) Brandon Dixon	Citation F1000	(Canada) Nicholas Belling	Firman	(United States) Brandon Dixon	Citation F1000
2011	(United States) Brandon Dixon	Citation F1000	(United States) Dave Palmer	Stohr F1000	(United States) Brian Novak	Piper DF5
2012	(United States) Brandon Dixon	Citation F1000	(United States) Lucian Pancea	Stohr F1000	(United States) Brandon Dixon	Citation F1000
2013					(United States) Lawrence Loshak	JDR F1000
2014					(United States) JR Osborne	Firman RFR-F1000
2015					(United States) JR Osborne	Firman RFR-F1000
2016					(United States) Kevin Roggenbuck	Firman RFR-F1000
2017					(United States) Alex Mayer	JDR F1000
2018					(United States) Gary Hickman	Edge Engineering
2019					(United States) Pete Frost	Phoenix

=== US Formula 1000 Champions ===
	US Formula 1000 Championship East		US Formula 1000 Championship West		US Formula 1000 Championship (Overall)	
2013	(United States) Lawrence Loshak	JDR F1000	(United States) Lucian Pancea	Stohr	(United States) Lawrence Loshak	JDR F1000
2014	(Canada) Jeremy Hill	Photon F1000	(United States) Larry Vollum	Stohr	(United States) Larry Vollum	Stohr
2015	East & West combined		East & West combined		(United States) JR Osborne	Firman
2016	East & West combined		East & West combined		(United States) Alex Mayer	JDR F1000

=== 2013 US Formula 1000 Championship Race Winners ===
	US Formula 1000 Championship (Overall Races)		US Formula 1000 Championship West		US Formula 1000 Championship East	
Race 1 COTA - Austin TX - March 9	(United States) Lawrence Loshak	JDR				
Race 2 COTA - Austin TX - March 10	(United States) Jose Gerardo	Stohr				
West Race 3 - Laguna Seca, Monterey, CA - April 14			(United States) Jake Latham	Stohr		
West Race 4 - Laguna Seca, Monterey, CA - April 14			(United States) Lucian Pancea	Stohr		
East Race 3 - VIR, Danville, VA - April 20					(United States) Glenn Cooper	Firman
East Race 4 - VIR, Danville, VA - April 21					(United States) Glenn Cooper	Firman
East Race 5 - Road Atlanta Atlanta, GA - May 18					(United States) Lawrence Loshak	JDR
East Race 6 - Road Atlanta Atlanta, GA - May 19					(United States) Lawrence Loshak	JDR
West Race 5 - Pacific, Kent, WA May 25			(United States) Lucian Pancea	Stohr		
West Race 6 - Pacific, Kent, WA May 26			(United States) Lucian Pancea	Stohr		
East Race 7 - Road America, Elkhart Lake, WI - June 15					(United States) Lawrence Loshak	JDR
East Race 8 - Road America, Elkhart Lake, WI - June 16					(United States) JR Osborne	Citation
West Race 7 - Sonoma Raceway, Sonoma, CA - July 6			(United States) Jose Gerardo	Stohr		
West Race 8 - Sonoma Raceway, Sonoma, CA - July 7			(United States) Jose Gerardo	Stohr		
East Race 9 - Watkins Glen, NY - July 6					(Canada) Jeremy Hill	Photon
East Race 10 - Watkins Glen, NY - July 7					(United States) Lawrence Loshak	JDR
West Race 9 - Miller MP, Tooele, UT - August 10			(United States) Jake Latham	Stohr		
West Race 10 - Miller MP, Tooele, UT - August 11			(United States) Lucian Pancea	Stohr		
Finale - Road America, WI - Sept 20	(United States) Lawrence Loshak	JDR				

=== 2014 US Formula 1000 Championship Race Winners ===
Note: 2014 saw the first standing starts in SCCA club racing when the US Formula 1000 Championship conducted standing starts at Pacific and Portland.

	US Formula 1000 Championship (Overall Races)		US Formula 1000 Championship West		US Formula 1000 Championship East	
East Race 1 - Road Atlanta, Atlanta, GA - March 22					(United States) Glenn Cooper	Firman
East Race 1 - Road Atlanta, Atlanta, GA - March 22					(United States) Glenn Cooper	Firman
West Race 1 - Thunderhill, Willows, CA - April 12			(United States) JR Osborne	Citation		
West Race 2 - Thunderhill, Willows, CA - April 13			(United States) JR Osborne	Citation		
East Race 3 - VIR, Danville, VA - April 19					(United States) Jason Bell	F1000
East Race 4 - VIR, Danville, VA - April 20					(United States) Glenn Cooper	Firman
West Race 3 - Pacific, Kent, WA May 24			(United States) Larry Vollum	Stohr		
West Race 4 - Pacific, Kent, WA May 25			(United States) Larry Vollum	Stohr		
East Race 5 - Road America, Elkhart Lake, WI - June 15					(Canada) Jeremy Hill	Photon
East Race 6 - Road America, Elkhart Lake, WI - June 16					(United States) Alex Mayer	F1000
West Race 5 - PIR, Portland, OR - July 5			(United States) Larry Vollum	Stohr		
West Race 6 - PIR, Portland, OR - July 6			(United States) Larry Vollum	Stohr		
East Race 7 - Watkins Glen, NY - July 5					(Canada) Jeremy Hill	Photon
East Race 8 - Watkins Glen, NY - July 6					(Canada) Jeremy Hill	Photon
West Race 7 - The Ridge, Shelton, WA - Aug 9			(United States) Larry Vollum	Stohr		
West Race 8 - The Ridge, Shelton, WA - Aug 10			(United States) Larry Vollum	Stohr		
East Race 9 - Mid Ohio, Troy OH - Aug 9					(Canada) Jeremy Hill	Photon
East Race 10 - Mid Ohio, Troy OH - Aug 10					(United States) Alex Mayer	F1000
West Race 9 - Laguna Seca, Monterey, CA - Sept 13			(United States) Gary Hickman	Phoenix		
West Race 9 - Laguna Seca, Monterey, CA - Sept 14			(United States) Jose Gerardo	Stohr		
Finale - Laguna Seca, Monterey, CA - Oct 11	(United States) JR Osborne	Firman RFR-F1000				

== See also ==
- 2022 North American Formula 1000 Championship
- 2021 North American Formula 1000 Championship
