= F-2000 =

F 2000 stands for:

- Eurofighter Typhoon F-2000A, a European fighter
- FN F2000, a Belgian bullpup rifle, designed by FN Herstal
- F2000, a heavy Truck by MAN Truck & Bus
- F2000, a business jet produced by French Dassault Aviation

== See also ==
- Formula 2000 (disambiguation)
- For the Formula 1 race car, see Ferrari F1-2000
