= Buonanno =

Buonanno is an Italian surname derived from a medieval given name meaning 'good year'. Notable people with the surname include:

- Alessandra Buonanno (born 1968), Italian-American theoretical physicist
- Gianluca Buonanno (1966–2016), Italian politician
- Helena Buonanno Foulkes (born 1964), American businesswoman and politician

== See also ==
- 73465 Buonanno, a minor planet
- Bonanno
- Bonano
