= Australian Formula 1000 =

CAMS WA AUS F1000 Championship
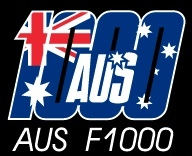
- Category: Single seater
- Country: Western Australia
- Inaugural season: 2014
- Engine suppliers: 1000cc motorbike engines
- Tyre suppliers: Hankook
- Drivers' champion: (Australia) Stewart Burns (Ribuck Industries) (Australia) Ben Riley (Infiniti Designer Pools & Matso Beer) (Australia) Alex Barboutis (Arise Racing - 34 Motorsport)
- Official website: www.ausf1000.com.au

The CAMS WA Aus F1000 Championship is an Australian state motor racing title for drivers of Formula 1000 racing cars. Starting in 2014, it is a state series. The series gained CAMS approval in 2014 and is based in Western Australia.

== History ==
The Formula 1000 category was established in North America in 2006 and within years had become popular across the United States and Europe. In 2013 Formula 1000 emerged in Australia in demonstration events before being approved to race by CAMS. A state series was contested in Australia for the first time in 2014 and will be an annual competition.

The series serves as a stepping stone for Australian racing drivers who aim to go on to greater things in motor racing both in Australia and overseas. Notably, two-time Australian Formula 3 Championship runner-up Leanne Tander competed in the inaugural championship, as did four-time Australian Sports Racer Series champion Adam Proctor.

F1000 competitors are predominantly self-run teams, with large-scale operations a rarity.

== CAMS WA Aus F1000 Championship ==
After a series of regularity events in 2013, the CAMS WA AUS F1000 Championship was approved by CAMS for 2014. It was the first F1000 season in Australian history and was contested over five rounds. It is officially known as the CAMS WA AUS F1000 State Championship.

The official Aus F1000 trophies are the Daniel Ricciardo Perpetual Trophy and the Silver Star Trophy

== Championships by season ==
=== 2014 Championship ===
The inaugural season was won by Stewart Burns from Ben Riley and saw eight drivers compete throughout the year.

The second meeting of the year was cancelled due to widespread mechanical issues.

The official tyre supplier of the series is Hankook through Perth Motorsport Tyres, with each competitor restricted to three sets of dry slicks for the season.

=== 2015 ===
After a successful 2014, Aus F1000 came back strong with 12 cars on the grid. With a strong start to the season and the new Arise Racing team bringing new cars and new competition to the series it brought 3 great races. Jordan Love set the new lap record for the series being 0:54.3312. By the end of the season the state championship was so close it saw Ben Riley and Rob Appleyard with the same number of points. Ben Riley took out the 2015 State Championship after winning and coming 2nd in more races than Rob Appleyard.

=== 2016 ===
2015 proved to be a successful year for the Aus F1000 series and 2016 brought even more close racing and competition. With 6 races for the season the cars and drivers have put on great races even in hard conditions. September brought a new and faster lap record set by Alex Barboutis with a time of 0:53.6872. The winner of the 2016 state championship and the Daniel Ricciardo Perpetual Trophy is Alex Barboutis.

This year a silver star trophy was introduced for people performing above 56.75 seconds a lap. If this lap time was broken 3 times the individual moves up into the State Championship. This year the winner of the Silver Star Trophy is Stewart Burns - Sponsors Ribuck Industries and TCS NDT.

=== 2017 ===
With the weather being touch and go all year on average 12 cars were set to compete for the 2017 CAMS WA Aus F1000 State Championship. Both Alex Barboutis and Sam Dicker proved strong with Alex Barboutis leading the State Championship by 3 points with only one round to go. Mike Folwell won the Silver Star on October 21.

== Series Winners ==
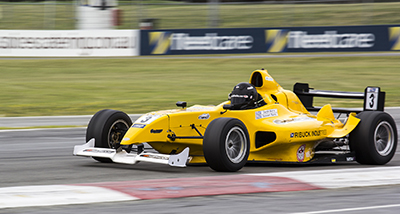
The Speads JKS 01 driven by 2014 champion Stewart Burns

Season	Series Name	Series Winner	Car
2014	CAMS WA Aus F1000 State Championship	Stewart Burns	Speads JKS 01
2015	CAMS WA Aus F1000 State Championship	Ben Riley	Stohr F1000
2016	CAMS WA Aus F1000 State Championship	Alex Barboutis	Stohr F1000
2017	CAMS WA Aus F1000 State Championship	Alex Barboutis	Stohr F1000
2018	CAMS WA Aus F1000 State Championship	Aaron Love	Stohr F1000
