= Bonani (surname) =

Bonani is a surname. Notable people with the surname include:

- João Bonani (born 1998), Brazilian association football player
- Maikon Bonani (born 1989), Brazilian player of American football

== See also ==
- Bonanni
