= Juninho da Silva =

Brazilian footballer

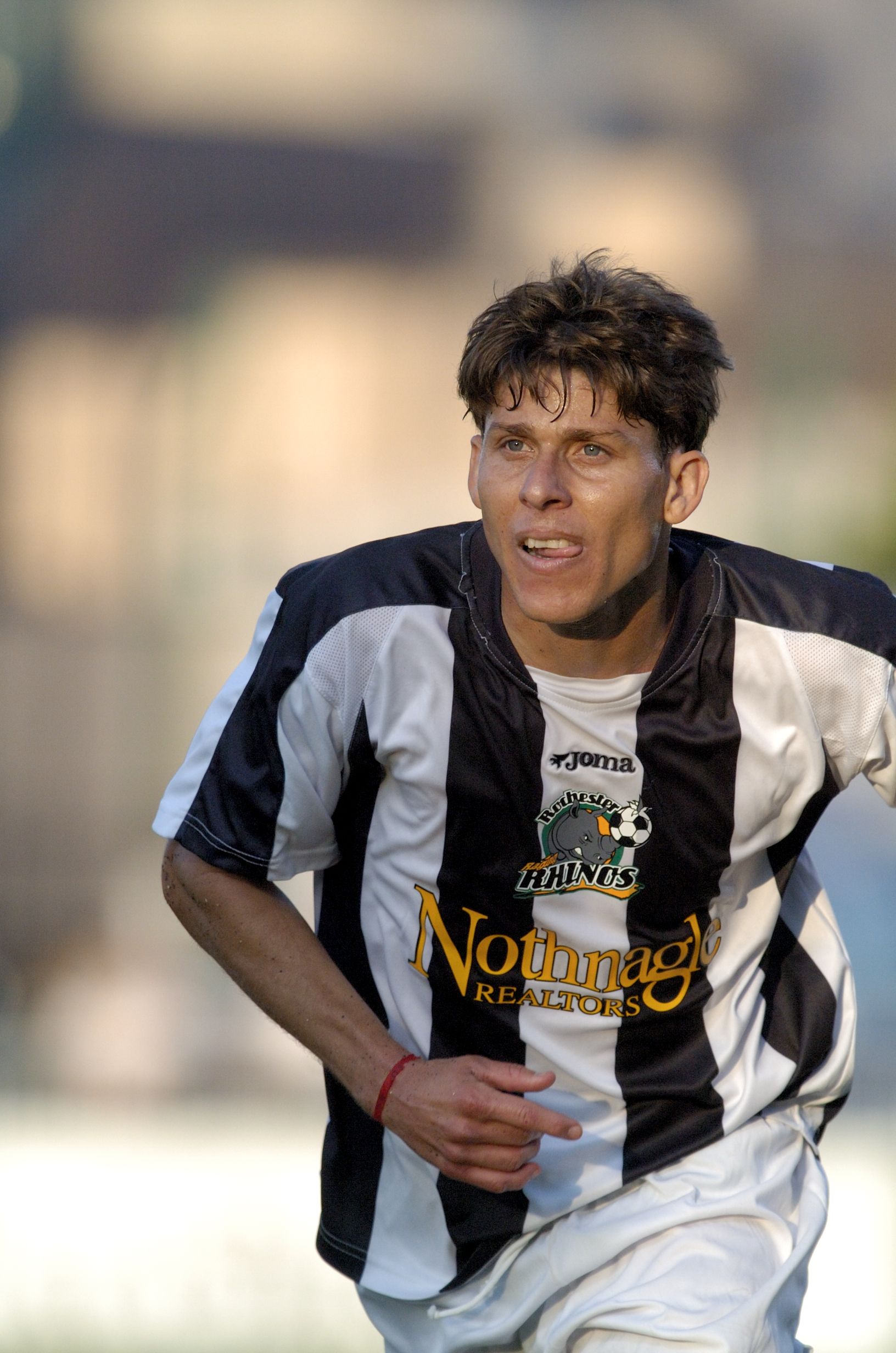

Edivaldo Sarafim da Silva Junior (born April 15, 1974) is a Brazilian retired professional association football midfielder. Using the name Juninho da Silva, played professionally in Brazil, Bolivia, Mexico, Tunisia, Puerto Rico and the United States.

Juninho da Silva started his career at the base of EC Vitoria of Bahia, Brazil, in 1989. In 1992, he moved to play for CR Flamengo in Rio de Janeiro, Brazil. Da Silva has accumulated several Brazilian clubs and abroad in his career, among them Independiente Petrolero Sucre in Bolivia, and CAB, Tunisia. After spending the season with EC Novo Hamburgo in Brazil, he signed with the Puerto Rico Islanders of the USL First Division in 2004, the Rochester Rhinos of USL-1 in 2005 and 2006. In the summer of 2008, Junhinho signed with Guaynabo Fluminense FC of the new Puerto Rico Soccer League. Then, in 2009, he signed with Club Atletico River Plate Ponce, also from the Puerto Rico Soccer League.
