= Formula 2000 =

Formula 2000 (F2000) may refer to:

- F2000 Championship Series
- USF2000 Championship
- Formula 2000 (Japan), a Japanese open-wheel racing category from 1973 to 1977
- Pacific F2000, a U.S. open-wheel racing category
- MRF Formula 2000, an Indian open-wheel racing category
- F2000 Italian Formula Trophy an Italian open-wheel racing series

== See also ==
- Formula 5000
- Formula 4000
- Formula 3000 (tier above F2000)
- Formula 1000
- Formula Three (replacement for F2000)
- Formula Two (replacement for F3000)
