= Bonanni =

Bonanni is an Italian surname derived from the medieval given name Bonanno, meaning 'good year'. Notable people with the surname include:

- Ángel Bonanni (born 1972), Uruguayan-Israeli actor and model
- Bret Bonanni (born 1994), American water polo player
- Claudio Bonanni (born 1997), Italian footballer
- Filippo Bonanni (1638–1723), Italian Jesuit scholar and conchologist
- Laudomia Bonanni (1907–2002), Italian writer and journalist
- Mariángela Bonanni (born 1988), Venezuelan beauty pageant winner and fashion model
- Massimo Bonanni (born 1982), Italian footballer
- Pearl Sinn-Bonanni (born 1967), Korean-American golfer
- Pietro Bonanni (1789–1821), Italian-American painter
- Raffaele Bonanni (born 1949), Italian trade unionist

== See also ==
- Bonani (surname)
