= Antonio Pacheco (Puerto Rican footballer) =

Puerto Rican footballer

Personal information
- Full name: Antonio Pacheco
- Place of birth: Puerto Rico
- Position: Forward

Team information
- Current team: Sevilla FC Puerto Rico

Senior career*
Years	Team	Apps	(Gls)
2010–	Guaynabo Fluminense		
2011–	Sevilla FC Puerto Rico	2	(0)
- * Club domestic league appearances and goals

Antonio Pacheco is a Puerto Rican soccer player who plays professionally in Puerto Rico for Guaynabo Fluminense. He has also played internationally for the Puerto Rico national football team and Puerto Rico Under-20 team.
