= Robin Bonanno =

American racing driver

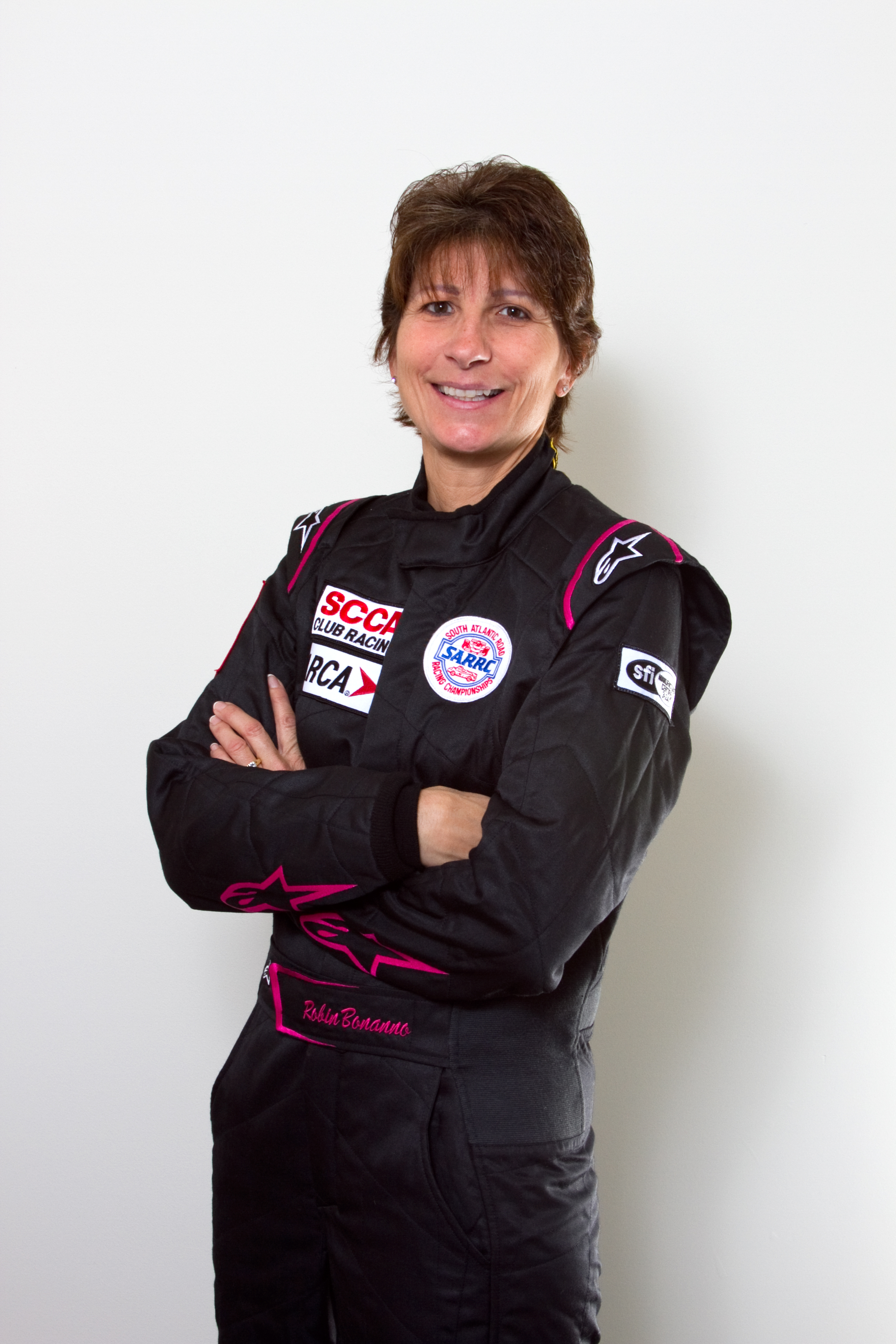
- Bonanno in 2009
- Nationality: American
- Born: August 4, 1962 (age 64) Nutley, New Jersey, U.S.
- Debut season: 2000
- Current team: Robin Bonanno Racing
- Crew chief: Carl Lunderstadt
- Former teams: Fast Track Racing
- Starts: 100+
- Championships: 5 Time SCCA DSR Champion
- Wins: 31 First Place Finishes

Robin Bonanno (born August 4, 1962 in Nutley, New Jersey) is an American race car driver with extensive experience in a variety of Sports Car and Stock Car sanctioned racing events. Bonanno was born in New Jersey then later moved to Florida in 1998 where she met Amos Johnson, who is a five-time winner of the Rolex 24 At Daytona. Johnson coached Bonanno through her early years behind the wheel, helping her to hone her racing skills.

Bonanno began racing in 2000 when she joined the Ferrari Club of America and brought her Ferrari to tracks such as Sebring International Raceway, Homestead-Miami Speedway and Moroso Motorsports Park. Bonanno began her professional racing career with the Sports Car Club of America and over the course of fifteen years has won five SCCA DSR road course championships in the Central Florida region. She has competed in The ARCA Menards Series driving the No. 10 car for Fast Track Racing.

From 2000 to 2003, Bonanno also raced a Triumph Spitfire in G Production of the SCCA. Bonanno obtained her racing license in September 2003 through Panoz Racing School at Sebring International Raceway. Bonanno also made her television debut at the Panoz Racing school during the filming of My Classic Car in September 2003. Later, Bonanno transferred to the British made Radical in D Sports Racing.

In December 2010, Bonanno competed in the Richard Petty Drivers Search III where she competed in several competitions including karts, midgets, short track, stock car, road course stock car, and Dodge Vipers. In addition, Bonanno ended up finishing in a Sprint Cup car at Charlotte Motor Speedway.

In April 2011, Bonanno went on to train in stock cars for the ARCA Menards Series, spending many practice hours at Rockingham Motor Speedway and the BMW Performance Driving School.

On May 22, 2011, Bonanno made her ARCA debut at New Jersey Motorsports Park competing in a road course event. She started 30th and finished, 24th completing the entire 67 lap race.

Throughout Bonanno's career, she had competed in over 100 SCCA sanctioned races including 57 podium finishes and 31 first-place finishes at race tracks including Daytona International Speedway and Sebring International Speedway.

== Personal life ==
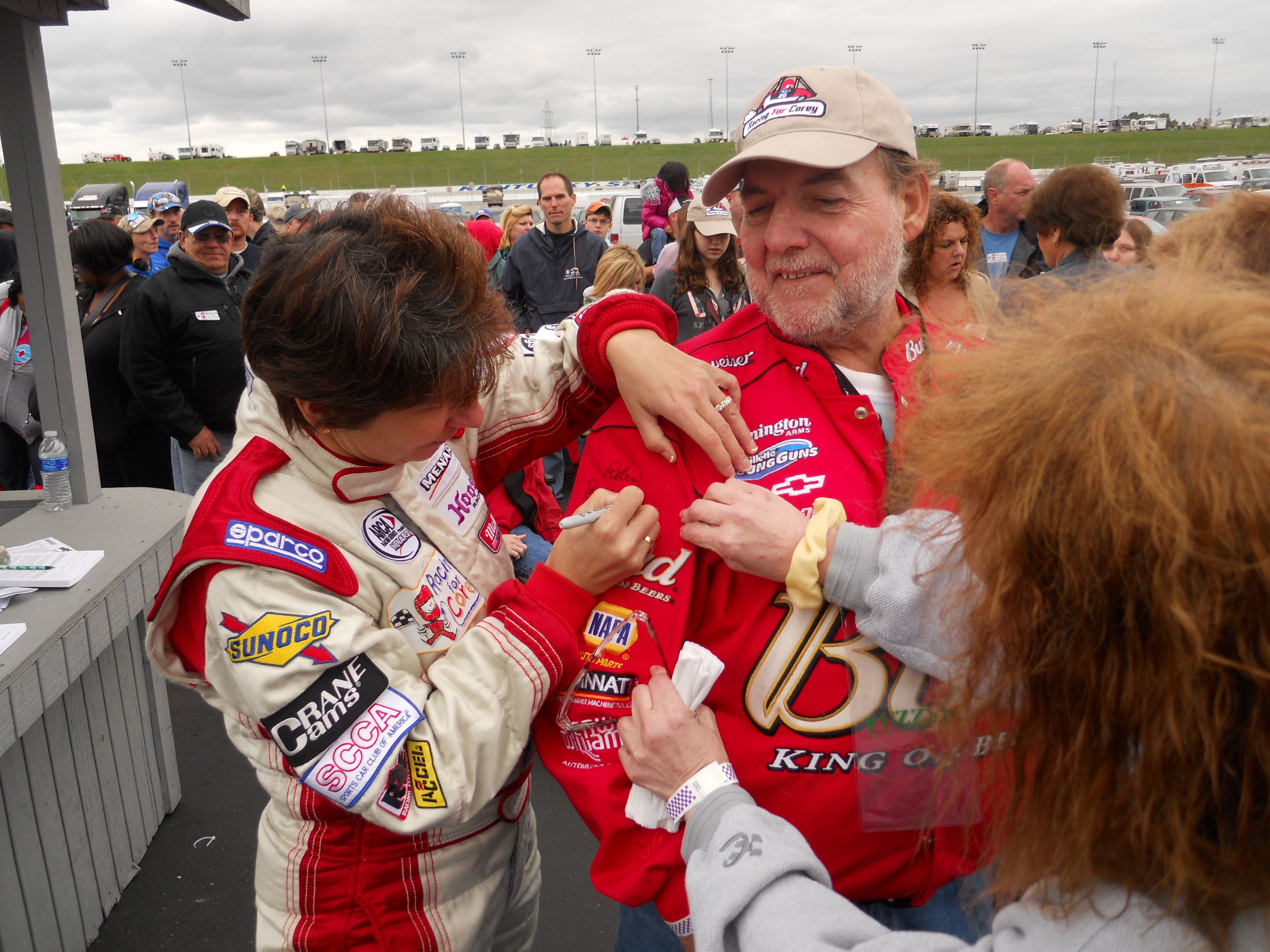
Robin Bonanno

At the age of 18, Bonanno started her first business manufacturing aluminum fly rod cases which sold products all over the world. While running her first business, she became a pilot and for two years enjoyed her passion for flying. After ten years of running her business, Bonanno sold the aluminum fly rod case company and went on to manage several other businesses. During this time, Bonanno also became a snow skiing instructor which she greatly enjoyed. After several years of business management, Bonanno retired to pursue a career in race car driving. Some of Bonanno's hobbies include bike riding, guitar playing and has even performed several ground-up car restorations. Bonanno is married to Carl Lunderstadt Sr. Bonanno and her husband Carl both have been racing instructors for five years teaching for SCCA and The Richard Petty Driving Experience on both road and oval courses.

== Championship Titles ==
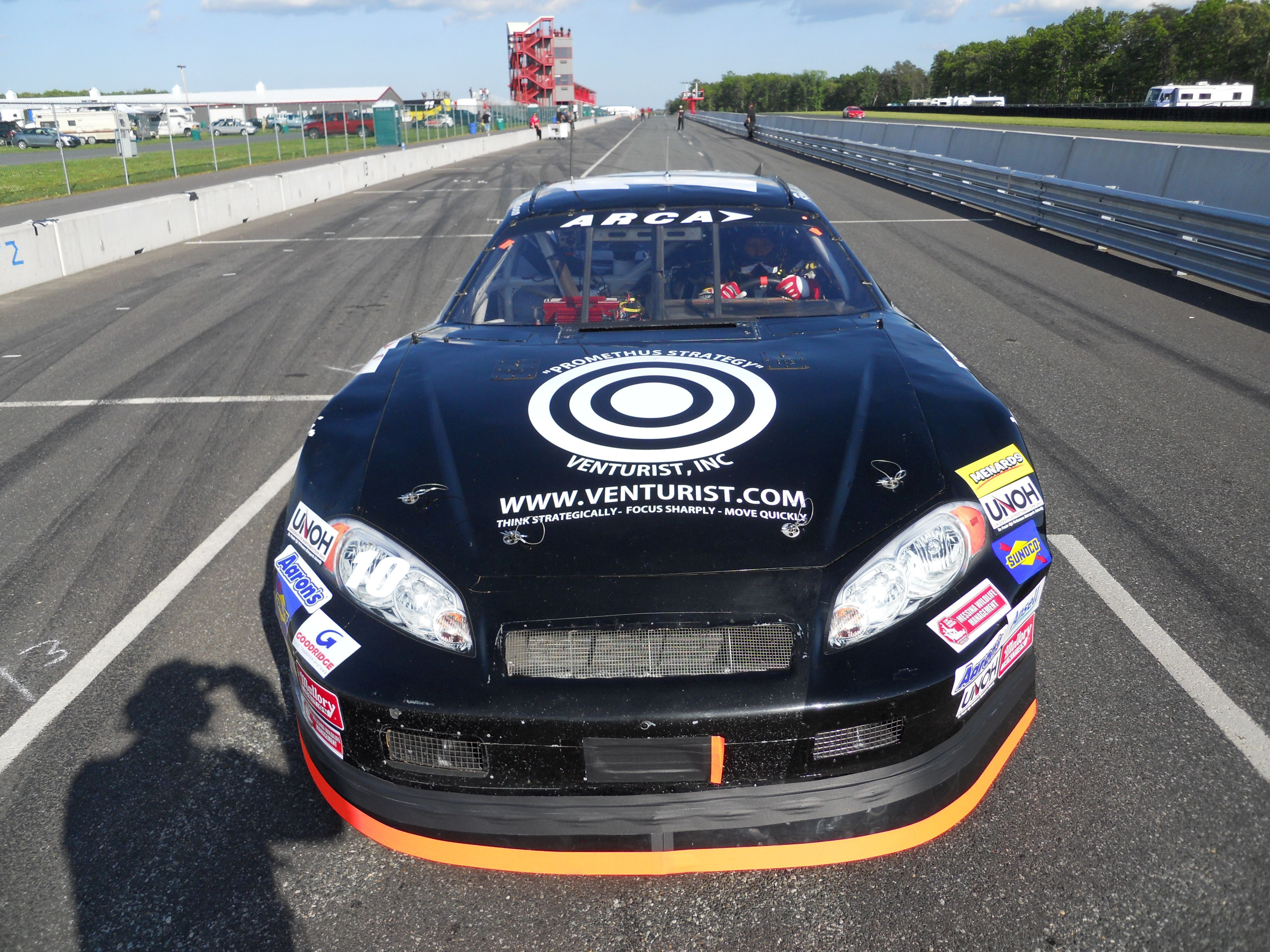
Robin Bonanno

SCCA Central Florida Region DSR 17x South Atlantic Road Racing and SCCA combined Championships, Formula Atlantic #50
2016, 2020, 2021, 2022 SARRC

== Accomplishments ==
Triumph Spitfire 2000 (Sebring, Florida)
ARCA Racing Series
Chevy Stock Car #10, Team Fast Track Racing
ARCA 2011 Best Finish (NJ) 24th
Richard Petty Drivers Search III Alumni
Richard Petty Race Instructor
SCCA Race Instructor

== Affiliates ==
Center State Bank

Venturist Inc.

Direct Mail Systems
