= Suprapubic cystostomy =

Surgical procedure to drain urine

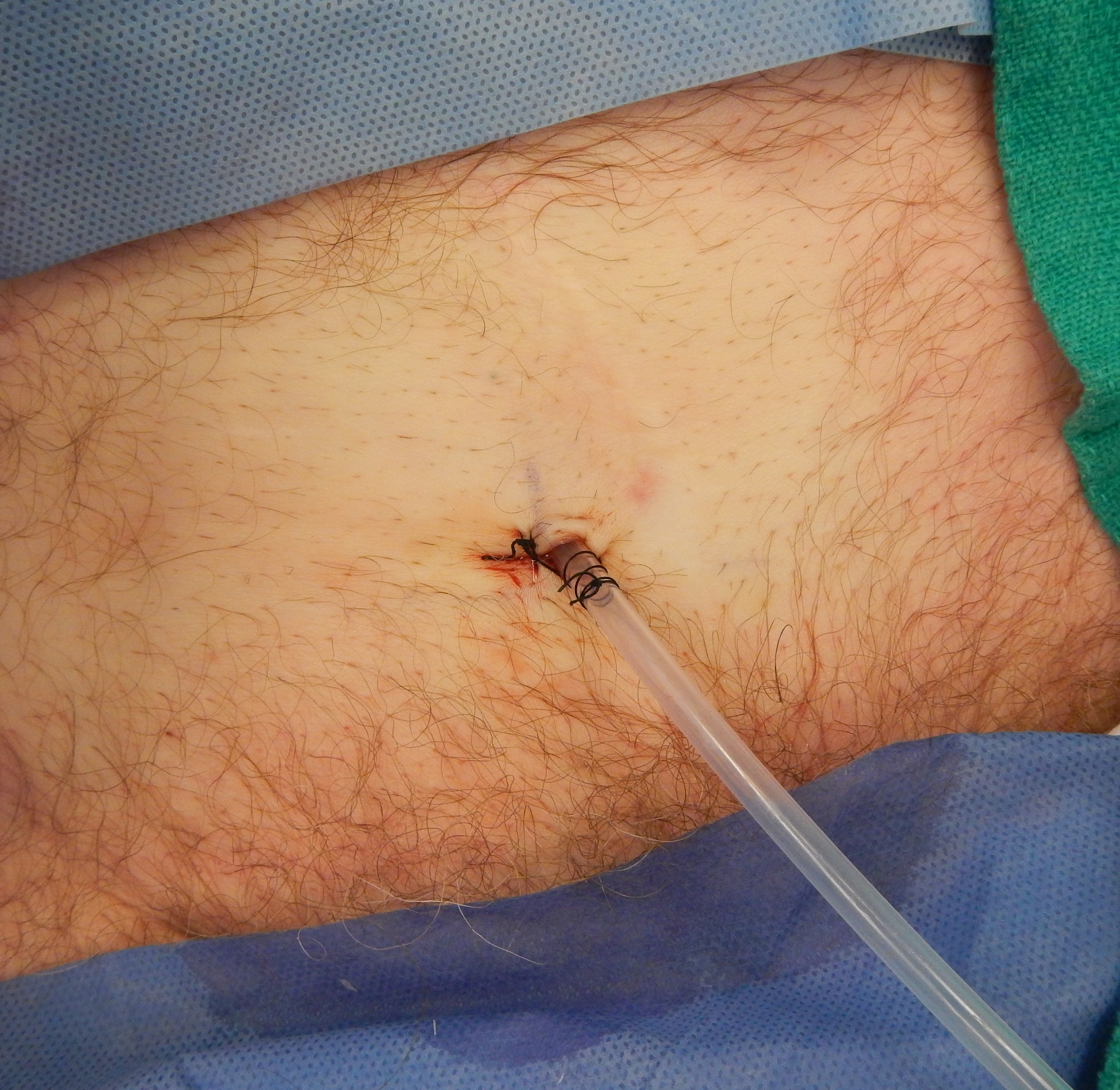
- A newly placed suprapubic catheter entering the abdomen just above the pubic bone
- Other names: Suprapubic catheter
- ICD-9-CM: V55.5, 57.17, 57.18
- MeSH: D003559

A suprapubic cystostomy or suprapubic catheter (SPC) (also known as a vesicostomy or epicystostomy) is a surgically created connection between the urinary bladder and the skin used to drain urine from the bladder in individuals with obstruction of normal urinary flow. The connection does not go through the abdominal cavity.

Urinary flow may be blocked by swelling of the prostate (benign prostatic hyperplasia), traumatic disruption of the urethra, congenital defects of the urinary tract, or by obstructions such as kidney stones passed into the urethra, and cancer. It is also a common treatment used among spinal cord injury patients who are unable or unwilling to use intermittent catheterization to empty the bladder and cannot otherwise void due to detrusor sphincter dyssynergia.

Initially, a thin tube (catheter) is placed through the skin just above the pubic bone into the bladder, often with the assistance of ultrasound imaging. This catheter initially remains in place for up to a month while the tissue around it scars and forms a tract (sinus) between the bladder and the body exterior. After the formation of scar tissue is complete, the catheter is replaced periodically in order to help prevent infection.

== Medical uses ==
- Failed urethral catheter,
- Long-term usage (if left in urethral long-term catheters, this can lead to acquired hypospadias and recurrent/chronic UTIs, urinary tract infections).
Illustrations
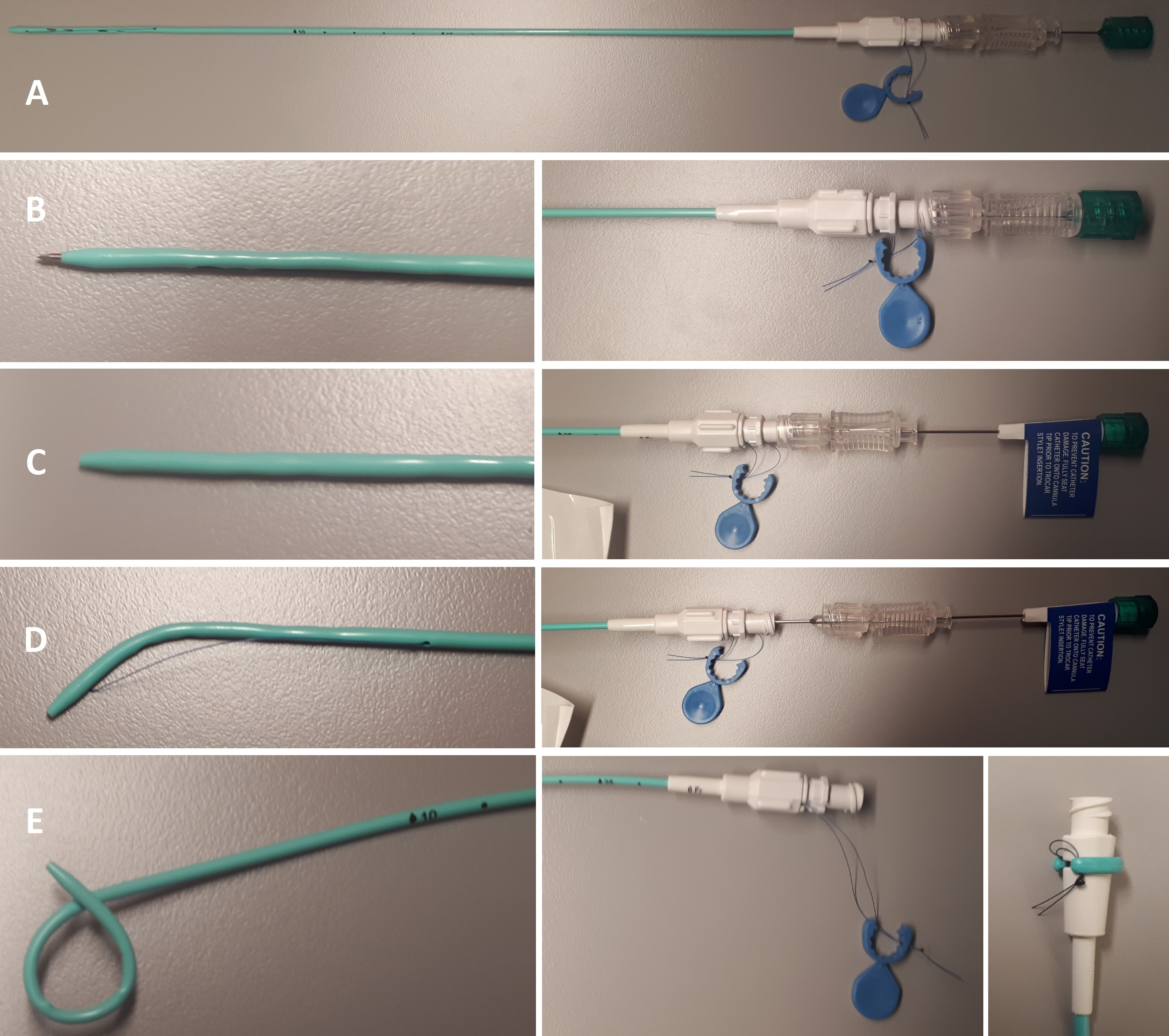
Various settings of a 6 French pigtail catheter with locking string, obturator (also called stiffening cannula), and puncture needle.
A. Overview
B. Both obturator and puncture needle engaged.
C. Puncture needle retracted. Obturator engaged.
D. Both obturator and puncture needle retracted.
E. Locking string is pulled (bottom center) and then wrapped and attached to the superficial end of the catheter.

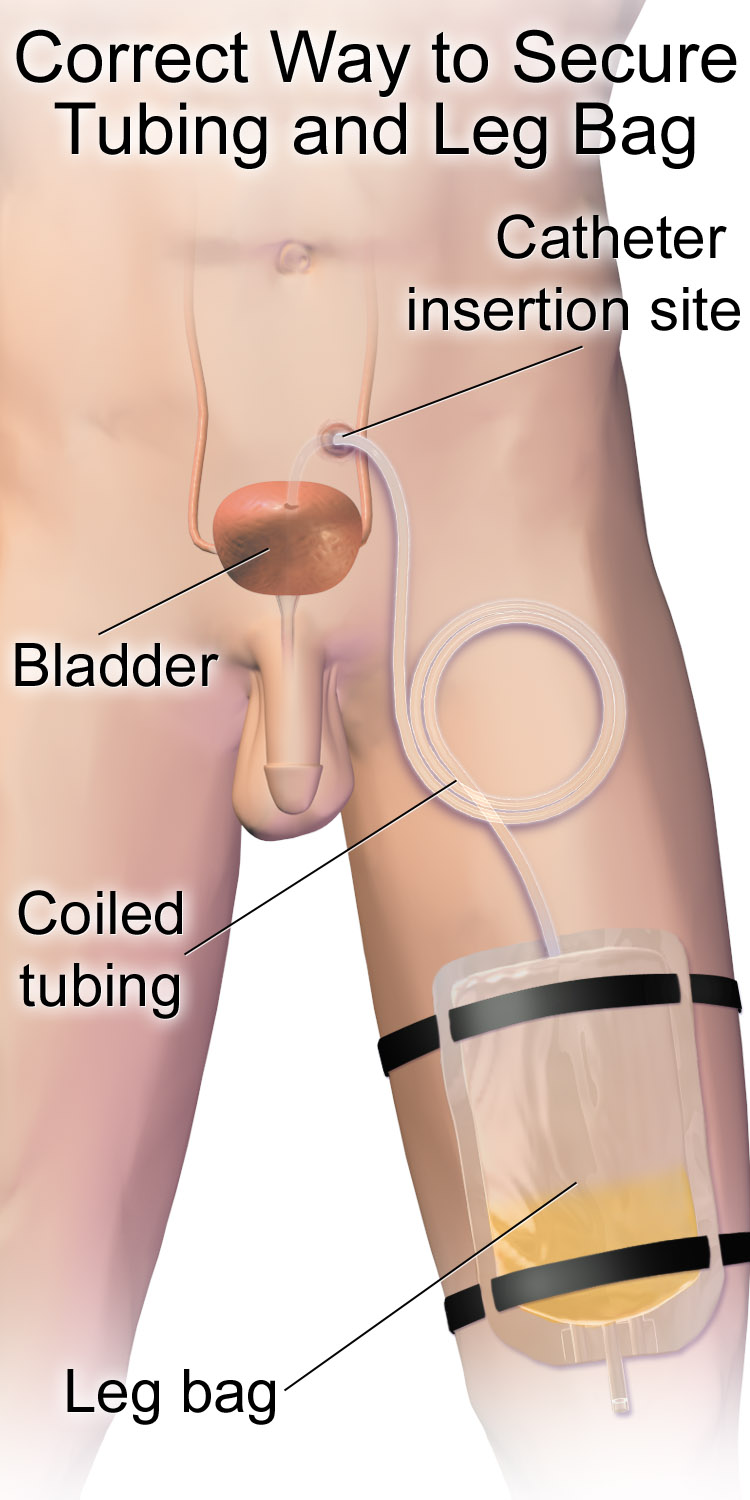
Illustration depicting the correct way to secure the tubing and leg bag of a suprapubic catheter on a male.

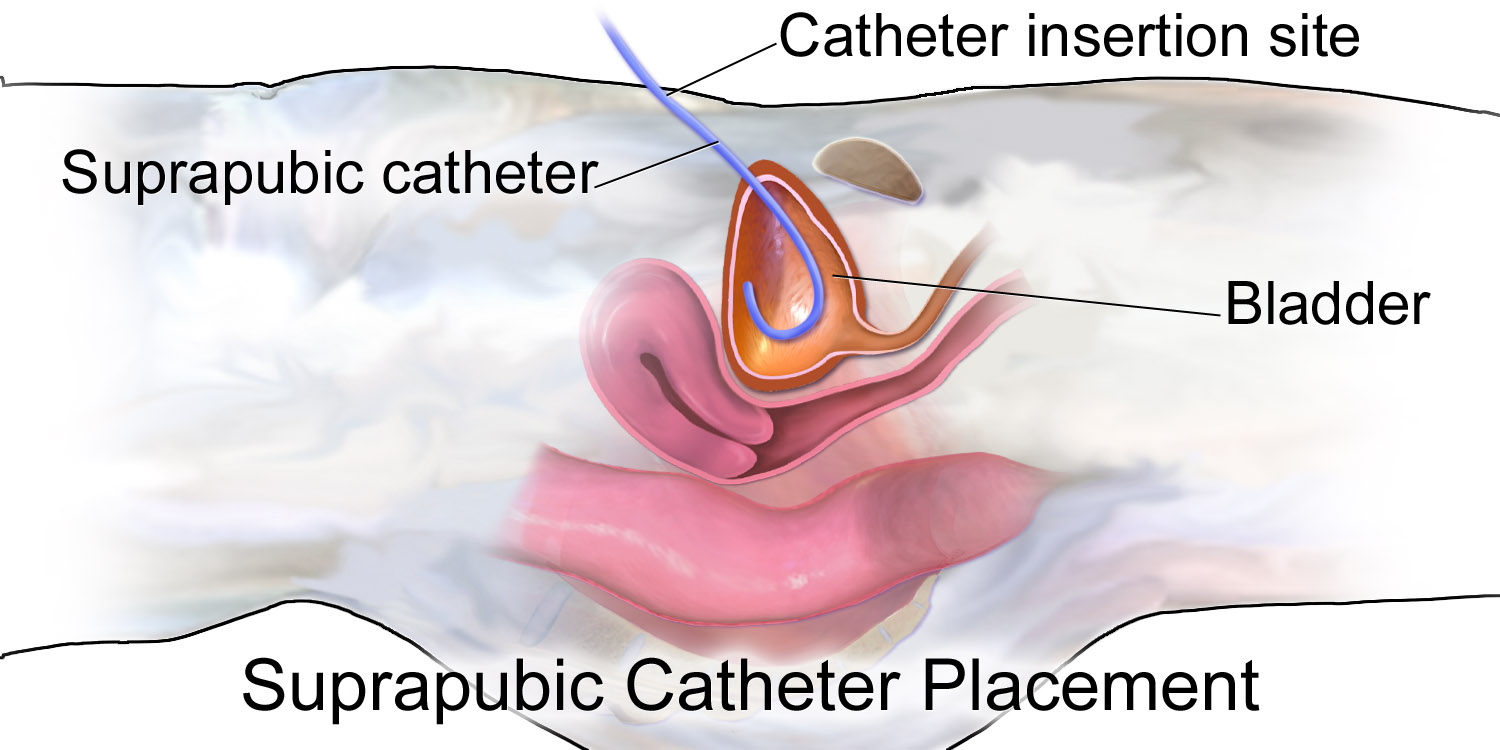
Illustration depicting the correct placement of a suprapubic catheter on a female.

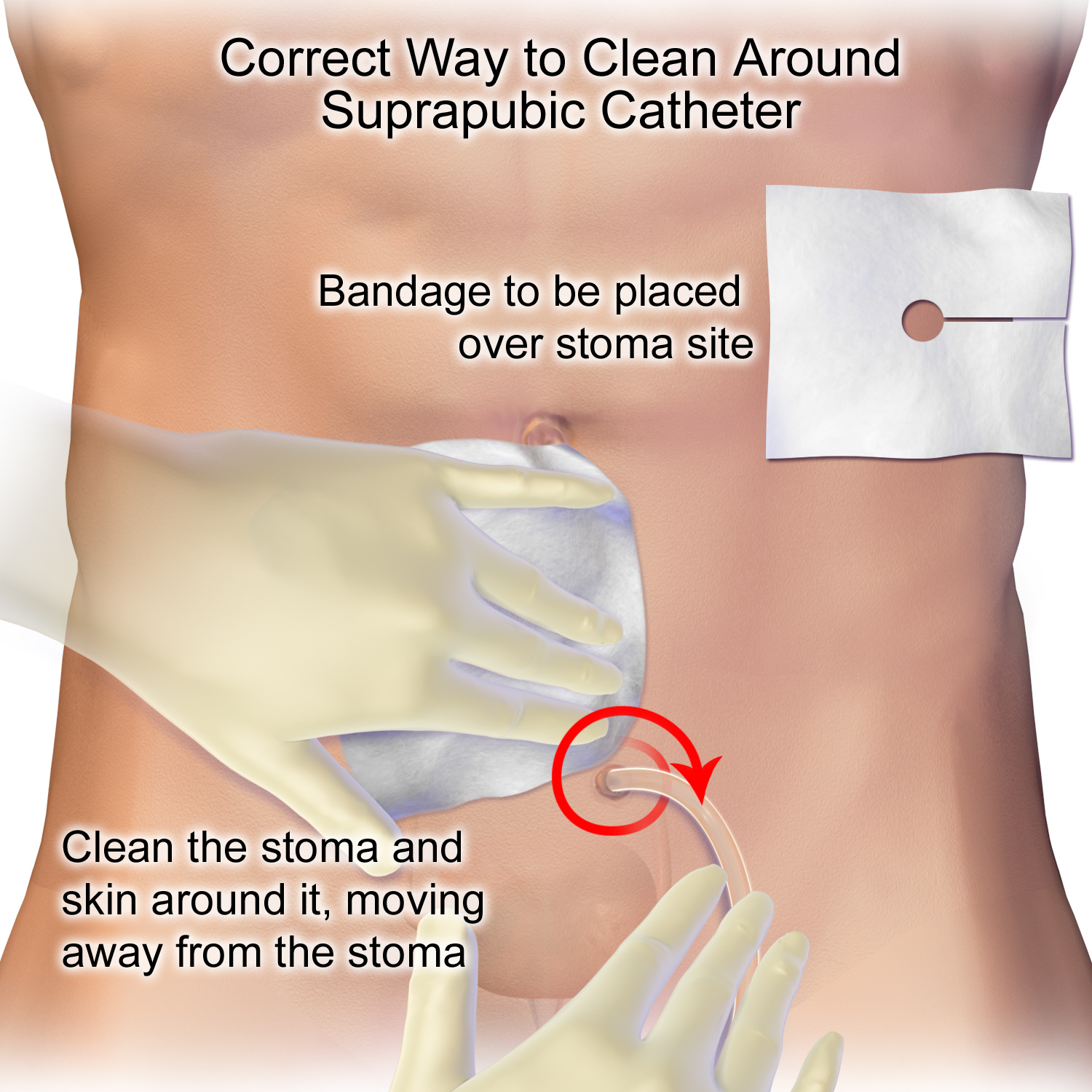
Illustration depicting the proper way to clean around a suprapubic catheter.

== Contraindications ==
- Need to rule out bladder cancer in cases of clot retention
- Lower abdominal incisions with likelihood of adhesions
- Pelvic fracture

== Complications ==
- UTIs
- Blockage
- Bladder stones
- Bladder cancer
- Bypass track by urine

== Society and culture ==
The "suprapubic cystotomy" is a specialty of the fictional physician Stephen Maturin in Patrick O'Brian's twenty-one volume series on the Royal Navy during the Napoleonic era. In modern medical terminology, "cystotomy" without the "s" refers to any surgical incision or puncture into the bladder, such as to remove urinary calculi or to perform tissue repair and reconstruction. "Cystostomy" is surgery specifically to provide drainage.

== See also ==
- List of surgeries by type
- Bonanno catheter, originally designed for suprapubic cystostomy
