= F10 =

F10, F 10, F.10, or F-10 may refer to:

== Aircraft ==
- Fokker F.10, a United States passenger and cargo airplane
- Hannover F.10, a German passenger and cargo triplane
- Douglas F3D Skyknight, a United States fighter aircraft was redesignated F-10 in 1962
- F-10 Vanguard, export designation of the Chinese Chengdu J-10 fighter aircraft
- A reconnaissance version of the United States North American B-25 Mitchell
- Falconar F10A, a Canadian homebuilt aircraft design

== Automobiles ==
- Ferrari F10, a race car
- Volvo F10, a truck platform
- BMW 5 Series (F10), a passenger car platform
- Datsun F10, a front-wheel drive supermini

== Other uses ==
- F10 (TV channel), a television channel in Bolivia
- F 10 Ängelholm, a Swedish Air Force wing
- ESP F-10, a guitar
- Factor X, a protein involved in coagulation
- F10, a function key on a computer keyboard
- A camera in the Fujifilm FinePix F series
- HMS Aurora (F10), a Royal Navy frigate
- HMS Parker (F10), a Royal Navy flotilla leader
- Blackwattle Bay ferry service, a ferry service in Sydney, Australia
- F10 notification to the Health and Safety Executive concerning a significant construction project in the UK, required under the Construction (Design and Management) Regulations 2007
- Italian submarine F10, an Italian Regia Marina (Royal Navy) submarine in commission from 1916 to 1930
