= F100 =

F-100 or F100 may refer to:

== Aerospace and defense ==
- North American F-100 Super Sabre, a fighter aircraft formerly in the service of the United States Air Force
- Fokker 100, a regional jet
- Pratt & Whitney F100, afterburning turbofan engine
- Álvaro de Bazán-class frigate (also known as the F100 class), in the service with the Spanish Armada Española

== Automotive ==
- Ford F-Series F-100, a pickup truck
- Formula F100, a racing class
- Daihatsu Hi-Line F100, a model of truck

== Other uses ==
- F-100 and F-75 (foods), a therapeutic food given to treat severe malnutrition
- Ferranti F100-L, a 16-bit microprocessor family from 1976
- Nikon F100, an autofocus 35mm single-lens reflex camera
- ESP F-100FM, one of the LTD Standard Series guitars manufactured by ESP
