= Estadio José "Pepito" Bonano =

Sports facility located in Guaynabo, Puerto Rico

Coordinates: 18.374484°N 66.112368°W

The Parque José “Pepito” Bonano is located in Guaynabo, Puerto Rico and is a sports facility used mainly for baseball, and soccer. It is used by Puerto Rico Soccer League's Guaynabo Fluminense FC for its soccer games.
