= Nicholas Bonanno =

American trade unionist (1927–2002)

Nicholas Bonanno (August 3, 1927 in New York City – July 19, 2002 in Atlanta) was an American trade unionist, the organizer, regional director, and Vice-President of the International Ladies' Garment Workers' Union (ILGWU).

== Biography ==
=== Work for the ILGWU ===
Nicholas “Nick” Bonanno worked for the ILGWU in a number of capacities for over fifty years. Beginning as a member of Local 89, also known as the Italian Dressmakers’ Union of the ILGWU, Bonanno worked as a sewing machine operator in New York City.

Bonanno was in the first class of the ILGWU's Training Institute, a competitive, year-long course in union leadership. After graduating in 1951, he served as an organizer and business agent in the ILGWU's Southeast Region. Throughout the 1950s and 1960s, Bonanno worked throughout the southern United States, the New York, and mid-Atlantic regions. In 1969, Bonanno was named Director of the ILGWU's Southeast Region, a position he held until 1995, when the ILGWU merged with the Amalgamated Clothing and Textile Workers Union to form the Union of Needletrades, Industrial and Textile Employees (UNITE). He was elected as a Vice-President of the ILGWU in 1971.

=== Other Labor Movement Involvement ===
Bonanno was also engaged in other labor movement activities, including the American Trade Union Council for Histadrut, Atlanta's Community Relations Committee, the United Italian American Labor Council., and the Jewish Labor Committee.

== Sources ==
- ILGWU. Communications Department biography files. 5780/177. Kheel Center for Labor-Management Documentation and Archives, Martin P. Catherwood Library, Cornell University.
- "Obituaries: Atlanta: Nicholas Bonanno, 74, labor movement leader." Atlanta Journal-Constitution. 24 Jul. 2002. Web. 26 Jan. 2011.
