= Bonanno catheter =

Medical device

A Bonanno catheter is a medical device. It was originally designed for suprapubic cystostomy (drainage of urine from the bladder through the skin, bypassing the urethra). Described by Dr J. P. Bonanno in 1970 and patented in 1987, it is produced by the medical supplies company Becton Dickinson. Apart from bladder drainage, it also has various other uses for which it has not actually been designed, such as thoracostomy and paracentesis.

The drain consists of a straight metal trocar, which serves as a core and guide for a plastic tube with a curved end that is kept straight while the trocar is inside. At the end of the plastic tube, a small flat plate is present that can be taped or sutured to the skin. The drain then ends in a connector that can be connected with a drainage bag.
