= D Sports Racing =

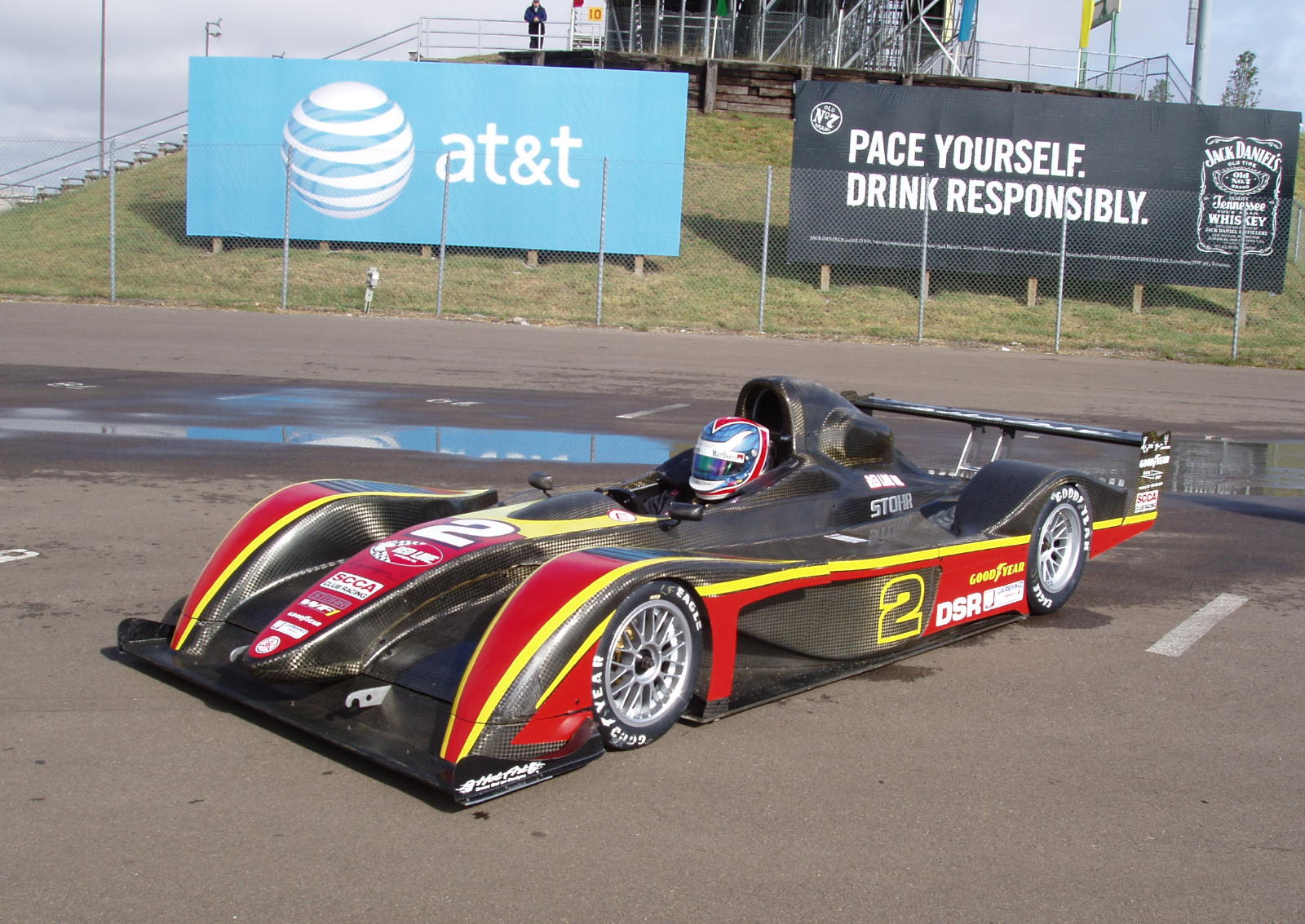
Mark Jaremko, 4 time DSR National Champion in his Stohr WF1

D Sports Racing now known as Prototype 2 is a sports prototype racecar class for road racing by the Sports Car Club of America. It has been called the one racing category that remains unfettered by regulations that have throttled innovation elsewhere in motorsport.

Usually known simply as DSR, the class began in 1968. DSR evolved from the SCCA's older H Modified class, which traces its roots back to the early 1950s. Today's DSR cars normally use a 1000cc four cylinder engine sourced from a Japanese motorcycle. Several other engines are allowed.

DSR's generally weigh under 1000 lbs with the driver and make 200 bhp at 13,000rpm. The relatively low cost of the engines and some new chassis manufacturers led to an explosion in growth of the class between the years 2000 and 2008. DSR's were the fastest class at the SCCA National Championship races in 2008.

== Manufacturers ==
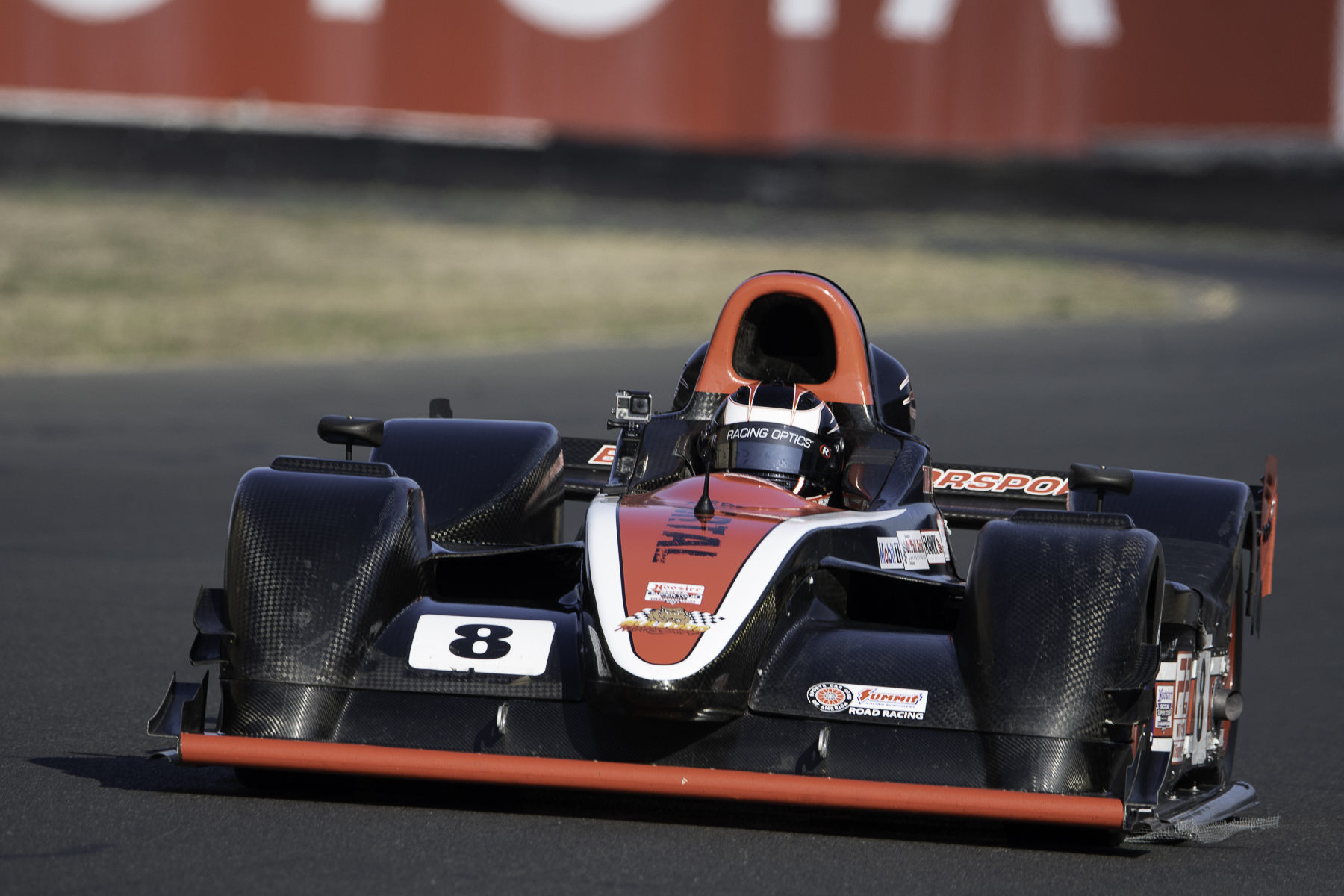
Tim Day Jr. in a Suzuki Hayabusa powered Stohr WF1 at the SCCA Runoffs in Prototype 2.

- A-Mac
- Cheetah
- Diasio
- Dragon
- Galmer
- LSR Prince
- Radical
- Speads
- Stohr Cars
- West Race Cars

== SCCA National Championship Runoffs ==
Year	Winner	Car	Engine
1966	(United States) Ed Luke	Lotus	Chevrolet
1967	(United States) Wayne Koch	Koch	
1968	(United States) Fred Plotkin	Abarth Special	
1969	(United States) Eric Kerman	Arachnid	Honda
1970	(United States) Marvin Thomson	Bobsy-Imp	
1971	(United States) Harry Stephenson	Maru	Honda
1972	(United States) Harry Stephenson	Maru	Honda
1973	(United States) Ronald Dennis	Ocelot	Suzuki
1974	(United States) Bob Marshall	Quasar	Suzuki
1975	(United States) Kendall Noah	Ocelot Mk.A	Suzuki
1976	(United States) Jeff Miller	Wynnfurst	Kohler
1977	(United States) Jeff Miller	Wynnfurst	Kohler
1978	(United States) Dave Leeson	LeGrand Mk.18	Kohler
1979	(United States) Dave Leeson	LeGrand Mk.18	Kohler
1980	(United States) Jerry Smith	LeGrand Mk.25	Kohler
1981	(United States) Jeff Miller	Lola T540	Kohler
1982	(United States) Paul Decker	LeGrand Mk.18	Suzuki
1983	(United States) Jeff Miller	Wynnfurst	Kohler
1984	(United States) Thomas Jagemann	Lola	Kohler
1985	(United States) Paul Decker	Decker Mk.1/2	
1986	(United States) Paul Decker	Decker Mk.1	
1987	(United States) Paul Decker	Decker Mk.1	
1988	(United States) Al Beasley Sr.	Bease-Decker Mk.II	
1989	(United States) Travis Duder	McCann	
1990	(United States) Michael Reupert	Lola	
1991	(United States) Travis Duder	Crossle	Nissan
1992	(United States) Travis Duder	Crossle	Nissan
1993	(United States) Travis Duder	Crossle	Nissan
1994	(United States) David Kaiser	LeGrand Mk.25D	
1995	(United States) David Kaiser	LeGrand Mk.25D	
1996	(United States) David Kaiser	LeGrand Mk.25D	
1997	(United States) Michael Reupert	Lola	
1998	(United States) Travis Duder	Cheetah SR-1	
1999	(United States) Bruce Sunseri	Cheetah SR-1	
2000	(United States) Al Beasley Jr.	BeaseDecker Mk.1	
2001	(United States) Marc Hoover	Cheetah	Mazda
2002	(United States) Mark Jaremko	Stohr 03D	
2003	(United States) Mark Jaremko	Stohr 03D	
2004	(United States) John Hill	Stohr	
2005	(United States) Mark Jaremko	Stohr WF1	
2006	(United States) Mark Jaremko	Stohr WF1	
2007	(United States) J.R. Osborne	Stohr WF1	
2008	(United States) J.R. Osborne	Stohr WF1	
2009	(United States) Garry Crook	Stohr WF1	Suzuki
2010	(United States) Lawrence Loshak	Stohr WF1	Suzuki
2011	(United States) Tom Bootz	Stohr WF1	Suzuki
2012	(United States) Scott Tucker	West WX10	Suzuki
2013	(United States) Chris Farrell	Stohr WF1	Suzuki
Prototype 2
2014	(United States) Fabian Okonski	Stohr 01D	Suzuki
2015	(United States) Chris Farrell	Stohr WF1	Suzuki
2016	(United States) Jeff Shafer	Stohr WF1	Suzuki
2017	(United States) Jeff Shafer	Stohr WF1	Suzuki
2018	(United States) Tim Day Jr.	Stohr WF1	Suzuki
2019	(United States) Tray Ayres	Van Diemen RF00	Mazda
2020	(United States) Greg Gyann	Stohr WF1	Suzuki
2021	(United States) Tim Day Jr.	Stohr WF1	Suzuki
2022	(United States) Greg Gyann	Stohr WF1	Suzuki
2023	(United States) Lucian Pancea	Stohr WF1	Suzuki
