= Stohr Cars =

Racing car designer/manufacturer

Stohr WF1
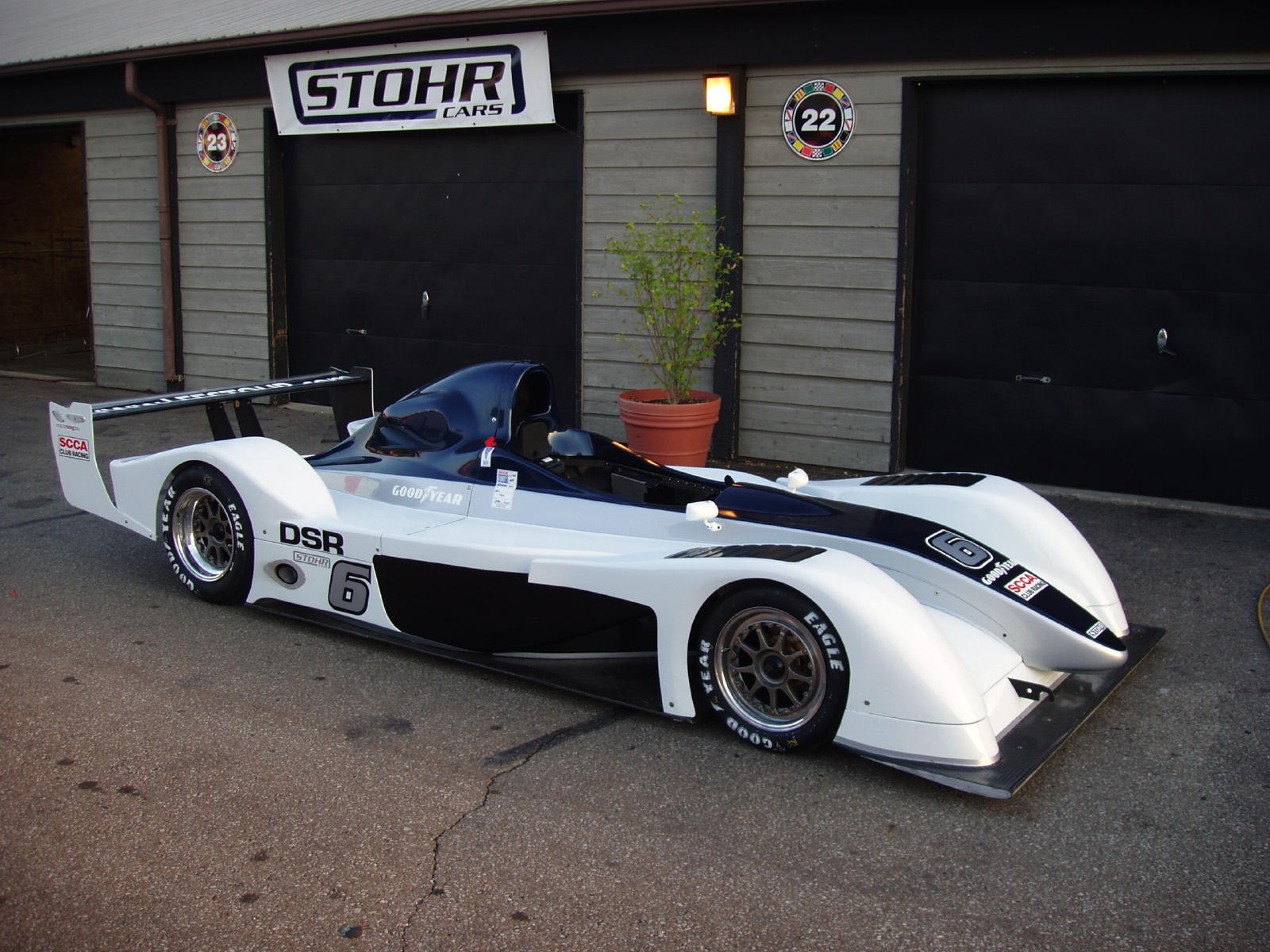

Overview
- Manufacturer: Stohr Cars
- Production: 2006-present
- Assembly: Denver, NC, USA
- Designer: Lee Stohr

Body and chassis
- Class: Sports car
- Body style: Roadster
- Layout: transversely mounted mid-engine, rear-wheel drive

Powertrain
- Engine: Various Sportbike
- Transmission: typically 6-speed sequential manual

Dimensions
- Wheelbase: 2,465 mm (97.0 in)
- Width: 1,625 mm (64.0 in)
- Curb weight: 353.78 kg (780.0 lb)

Chronology
- Predecessor: Stohr DSR

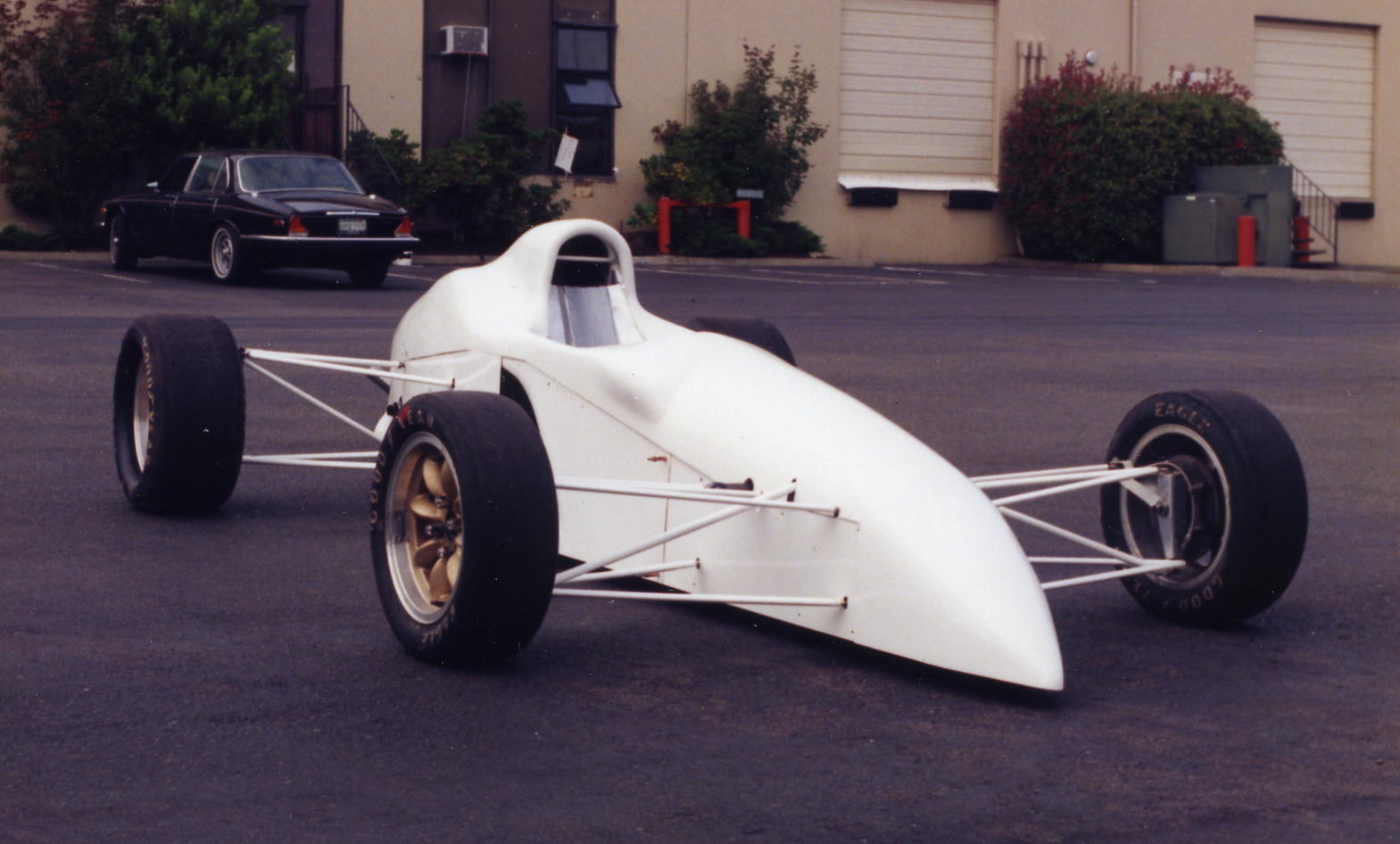
The first competitive Stohr Formula Ford

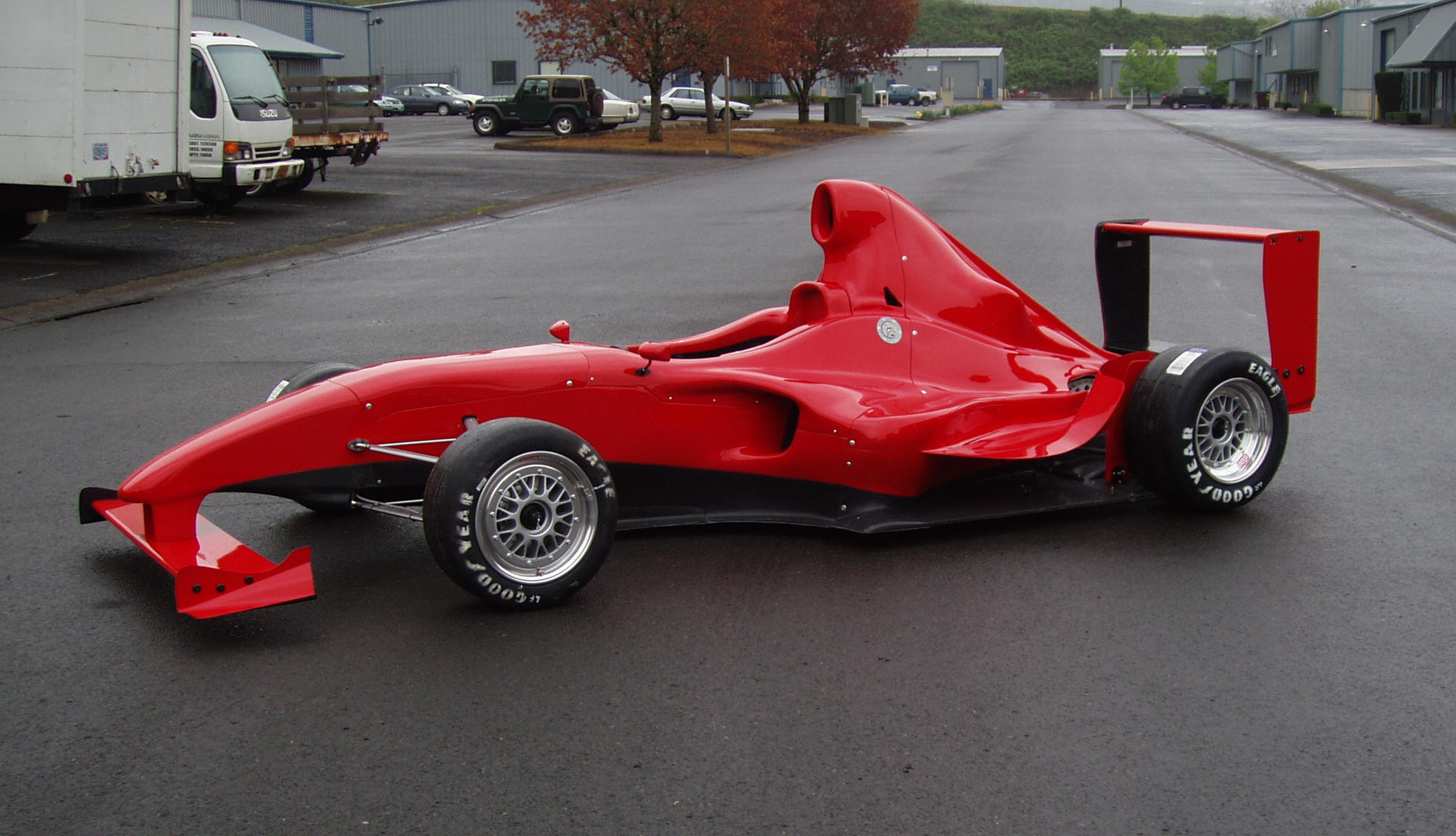
The Stohr F1000

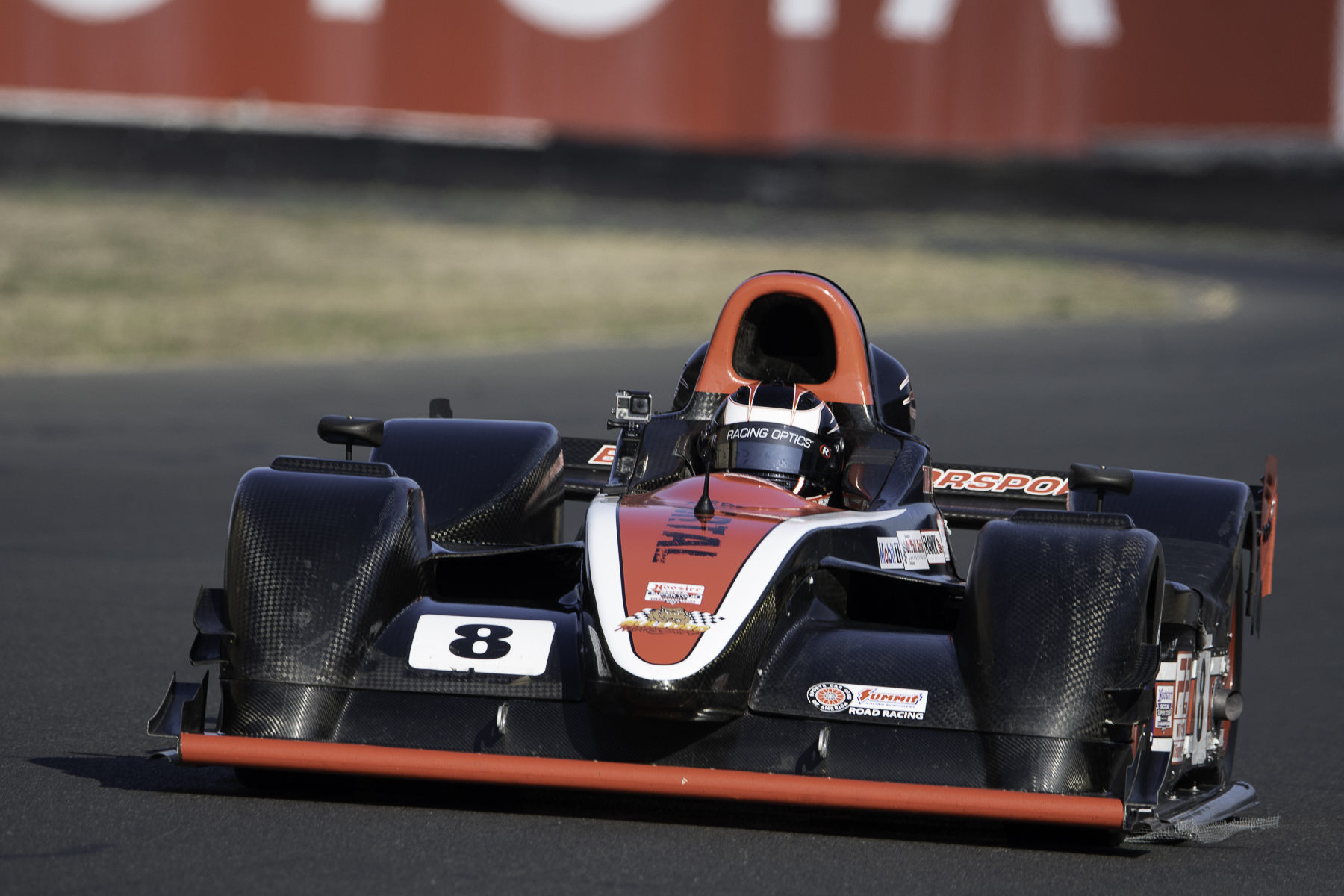
Tim Day Jr the 2018 SCCA National Champion in Prototype 2 in a 2006 Stohr WF1 race car, powered by a Suzuki Hayabusa motor

Stohr Cars designs and builds racing cars mainly for competition within the Sports Car Club of America. The business was founded by Lee Stohr in 1991 and is based in Denver, NC, USA. 138 racing cars have been produced as of December 2021. Stohr Cars was purchased by Dauntless Racing in 2014.

== Origins ==
After driving an Elden FF for several years in the early 1980s, Lee Stohr designed and built several of his own Formula Fords, Formula Continentals and a Formula 3 type car. In 2001 Stohr moved into the D Sports Racing class. Their first national championship came just one year later with a sports racer with Mark Jaremko driving at the SCCA Runoffs at Mid-Ohio. In 2005 Lee Stohr and Wayne Felch expanded the business with the introduction of the faster WF1. The company was one of the first to join the Formula 1000 class in early 2007. In 2014, Stohr Cars was acquired by Dauntless Racing of Vacaville, CA. In March 2021, Stohr Cars relocated from Vacaville, CA to a new and larger facility in Denver, NC

== Notable racing results ==
- 2023 SCCA National Champion, P2. Stohr WF1; Driver: Lucian Pancea
- 2022 SCCA National Champion, P2. Stohr WF1; Driver: Greg Gyann
- 2021 SCCA National Champion, P1. Stohr WF1; Driver: Lee Alexander
- 2021 SCCA National Champion, P2. Stohr WF1; Driver: Tim Day Jr.
- 2020 SCCA National Champion, P2. Stohr WF1; Driver: Greg Gyann
- 2018 SCCA National Champion, P2. Stohr WF1; Driver: Tim Day Jr.
- 2017 SCCA National Champion, P1. Stohr WF1; Driver: Jonathan Eriksen
- 2017 SCCA National Champion, P2. Stohr WF1; Driver: Jeff Shafer
- 2016 SCCA National Champion, P2. Stohr WF1; Driver: Jeff Shafer
- 2015 SCCA National Champion, P2. Stohr WF1; Driver: Chris Farrell
- 2015 SCCA National Champion, P1. Stohr WF1; Driver: Gianpolo Ciancimino
- 2014 SCCA National Champion, P2. Stohr 01D; Driver: Fabian Okonski
- 2014 SCCA National Champion, P1. Stohr WF1; Driver: Chris Farrell
- 2013 Australian National Champion, Sports Racer. Stohr WF1; Driver: Adam Proctor
- 2013 Grassroots Motorsport magazine, Track Day Car of the Year, Stohr WF1
- 2013 SCCA National Champion, D Sports Racing. Stohr WF1; Driver: Chris Farrell
- 2013 SCCA National Champion, C Sports Racing. Stohr WF1; Driver: Lee Alexander
- 2012 Australian National Champion, Sports Racer. Stohr WF1; Driver: Adam Proctor
- 2011 Australian National Champion, Sports Racer. Stohr WF1; Driver: Adam Proctor
- 2011 SCCA National Champion, D Sports Racing. Stohr WF1; Driver: Tom Bootz
- 2010 SCCA National Champion, D Sports Racing. Stohr WF1; Driver: Lawrence Loshak
- 2009 SCCA National Champion, D Sports Racing. Stohr WF1; Driver: Gary Crook
- 2008 SCCA National Champion, D Sports Racing. Stohr WF1; Driver: JR Osborne
- 2008 SCCA National Champion, C Sports Racing. Stohr WF1; Driver: JR Osborne
- 2007 SCCA National Champion, D Sports Racing. Stohr WF1; Driver: JR Osborne
- 2006 SCCA National Champion, D Sports Racing. Stohr WF1; Driver: Mark Jaremko
- 2005 SCCA National Champion, D Sports Racing. Stohr WF1; Driver: Mark Jaremko
- 2004 SCCA National Champion, D Sports Racing. Stohr DSR; Driver: John Hill
- 2003 SCCA National Champion, D Sports Racing. Stohr DSR; Driver: Mark Jaremko
- 2002 SCCA National Champion, D Sports Racing. Stohr DSR; Driver: Mark Jaremko
- 2023 Tire Rack Ultimate Track Car Challenge. Stohr 01D; Driver: Ghais Khaleghi

== Cars ==
Year	Car	Class
1990	Stohr FF2	Formula Ford 1600
1993	Stohr	Formula Ford 2000
1995	Stohr F3	Formula 3
1999	Stohr FF99	Formula Ford 1600
2001	Stohr 01D	D Sports Racing
2005	Stohr WF1	D Sports Racing
2007	Stohr F1000	Formula 1000
