= Ralph Firman Racing =

British racecar constructor

- Industry: Automotive
- Founded: 2008
- Founder: Ralph Firman, Sr. Ralph Firman Jr.
- Headquarters: Snetterton
- Website: http://www.rfrcars.com/

Ralph Firman Racing is a British racecar constructor. The company was founded in 2008 by Ralph Firman, Sr.

== History ==
Ralph Firman, Sr. was one of the founders of Van Diemen in 1973 which went on to become one of the leading formula car constructors in the world before being sold to Élan Motorsport Technologies in 1999. After the sale Ralph Firman, Sr. set up a small company near the Snetterton Motor Racing Circuit which became Ralph Firman Racing (RFR) in 2008.

In 2009 RFR began to develop Formula 1000 and F2000 Championship Series cars. In both classes the RFR cars won races in their first season in America. In 2012 the RFR Formula 1000 was chosen as the exclusive car for the Middle East-based Formula Gulf 1000.

In September 2012, RFR was hired by Jonathan Palmer's MotorSport Vision to develop and build a new car for the BRDC Formula 4 Championship, the MSV F4-013 which made its debut in 2013. The company has also launched new Formula Ford 1600 chassis, the RFR17 and RFR21.

== Cars ==
Year	Car	Class
2009	RFR F1000	Formula 1000
2009	RFR F2000	F2000 Championship Series
2013	MSV F4-013	BRDC Formula 4 Championship
