= Formula 1000 =

Open wheel class of Formula car racing

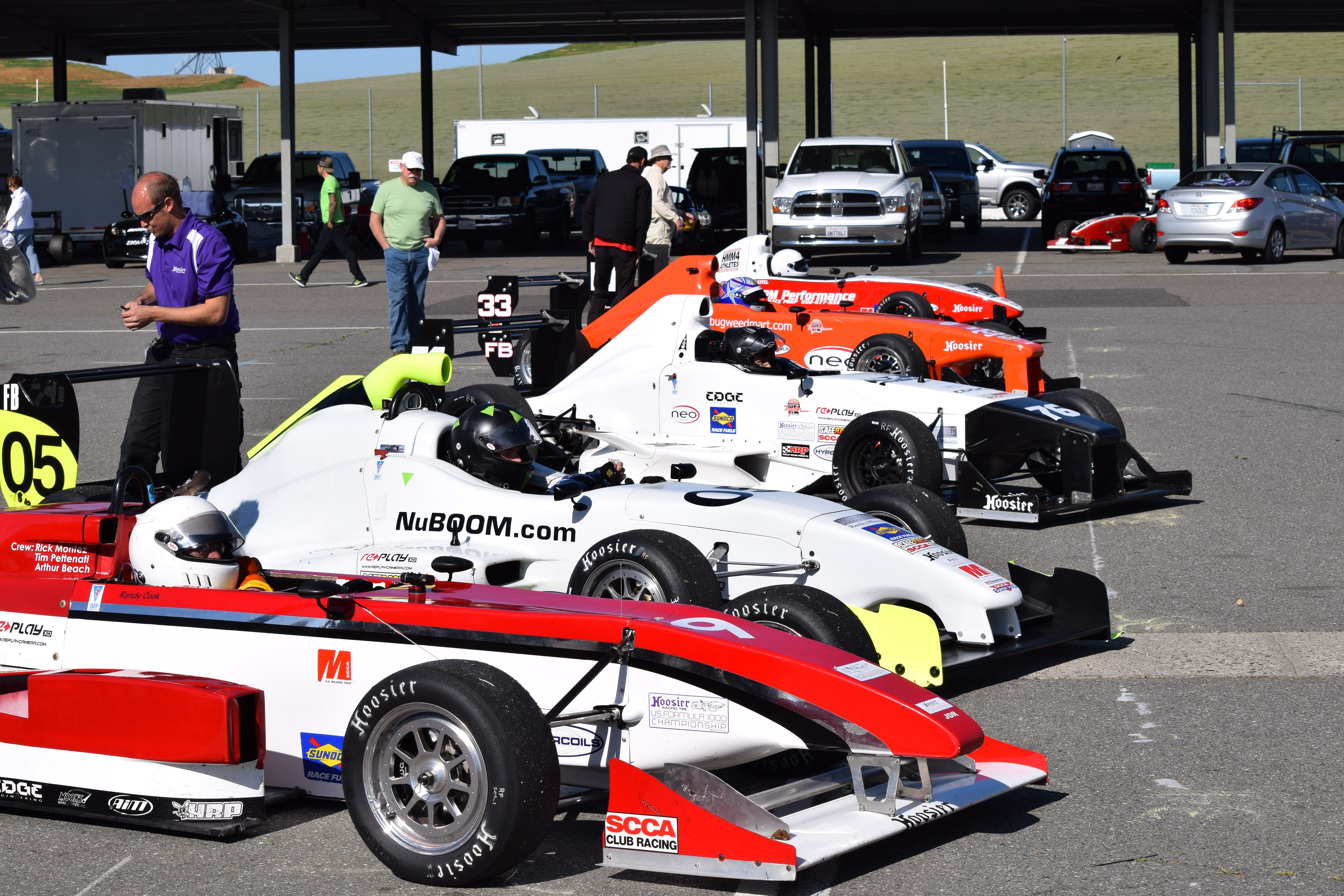
F1000 cars in 2013.

Formula 1000 (F1000) is a class of open wheel formula racing with professional and amateur series worldwide. Formula 1000 gets its name from the 1000 cc (1.0 L) super-bike engine used to power a single seat, open wheel race car with fully adjustable wings and suspension.

Currently in the United States, F1000 runs in SCCA under the FA (Formula Atlantic) class (it was previously run as the FB class prior to 2020) or under SCCA Pro Racing with the North American Formula 1000 Championship.

Formula 1000 cars are priced between $40,000 to $75,000. SCCA rules also allow conversion of an existing Formula car (e.g., FC) to meet F1000 requirements.

Formula 1000 race cars can reach speeds higher than 274 km/h (170 mph) and experience as much as 3 Gs of downforce on brakes and corners.

There is a similar but distinct category in the UK called F1000, run by the 750 Motor Club.

== Manufacturers ==
Manufacturers of Formula 1000 race car conversions are listed below in alphabetical order. A Formula 1000 conversion involves the modification of an existing Formula 1000 race car to meet current Formula 1000 rules. One of the major changes involved in a conversion is replacing the original engine and drive train with a 1000 cc super-bike engine using a chain drive train. Other modifications may include chassis frame changes, suspension changes and the addition of an aerodynamics package consisting of front and rear wings with a floor pan diffuser.

Manufacturers
Manufacturer	Models	Notes
Citation		
Griiip	G1	
Gloria	C7F	
JDR Race Cars		
Novak Van Diemen Conversion		
Philadelphia Motorsports		
Phoenix Race Works	F1K.10	
Piper Engineering	DF6	
Racing Concepts	Speads RM-07A	
Ralph Firman Racing	RFR F1000 009	
SSR Engineering	2007 RF07	
Stohr Cars	F1000	

== Engines ==
All specifications are manufacturer claimed. Rear wheel horsepower is measured with engine installed in superbike. Installed in a Formula car, rear wheel horsepower may differ from values below.

=== Manufacturers ===
Honda, Kawasaki, Suzuki, Yamaha, Aprilia

=== Popular Suzuki engines in F1000 competition ===
==== Suzuki K7: 2007–2008 ====
- Engine: 998.6 cc (60.94 cu in), 4-stroke, four-cylinder, liquid-cooled, DOHC, 16-valve, TSCC
- Bore Stroke: 73.4 mm (2.89 in) x 59.0 mm (2.32 in)
- Compression Ratio: 12.5:1
- Power (crank) 185 hp (138 kW) @ 12,000 rpm
- Fuel System: Fuel Injection
- Lubrication: Wet Sump or Dry Sump
- Ignition: Digital/transistorized
- Transmission: 6-speed, constant mesh 6-speed, constant mesh, Back-torque limiting clutch

==== Suzuki K9: 2009–2012 ====
- Engine 999 cc (61.0 cu in), 4-stroke, four-cylinder, liquid-cooled, DOHC, 16-valve, TSCC
- Bore Stroke: 74.5 mm (2.93 in) x 57.3 mm (2.26 in)
- Compression Ratio 12.8:1
- Power (crank) 191 hp (142 kW) @ 12,000 rpm
- Fuel System: Fuel Injection
- Lubrication: Wet Sump or Dry Sump
- Ignition: Digital/transistorized
- Transmission: 6-speed sequential, constant mesh 6-speed, constant mesh, Back-torque limiting clutch

=== Honda engines ===
Honda Engine
	2004/2005	2006/2007
Engine Type	998 cc liquid-cooled inline four-cylinder	
Bore/Stroke	75.0 mm (3.0 in) x 56.5 mm (2.2 in)	
Compression Ratio	11.9:1	12.2:1
Rear Wheel Horsepower	148.6 bhp (110.8 kW) @ 10,750 rpm	158.8 bhp (118.4 kW) @ 11,500 rpm
Rear Wheel Torque	76.4 lb⋅ft (103.6 N⋅m) @ 8,500 rpm	79.6 lb⋅ft (107.9 N⋅m) @ 8,750 rpm
Redline	13,000 rpm	xx,xxx rpm
Valve Train	DOHC; four valves per cylinder	
Fuel Delivery	Dual Stage Fuel Injection (DSFI)	
Ignition	Computer-controlled digital transistorized with three-dimensional mapping	
Drivetrain
Transmission	Cassette-type, close-ratio six-speed	

== Formula 1000 at the SCCA National Championship Runoffs ==
Year	Winner	Car	Engine
2010	(United States) Brandon Dixon	Citation F1000	Suzuki
2011	(United States) Brian Novak	Piper F1000	Suzuki
2012	(United States) Brandon Dixon	Citation F1000	Suzuki
2013	(United States) Lawrence Loshak	JDR-012	Suzuki
2014	(United States) J.R. Osborne	RFR F1000	Kawasaki
2015	(United States) J.R. Osborne	RFR F1000	Kawasaki
2016	(United States) Kevin Roggenbuck	RFR F1000	Kawasaki
2017	(United States) Alex Mayer	JDR-012	Suzuki
2018	(United States) Gary Hickman	Phoenix	Suzuki
2019	(United States) Pete Frost	Phoenix	Suzuki

== Defunct editions of F1000 ==
Defunct F1000 Racing Series:

- F1000 Championship (2007-2013) - Was a "membership" championship that did not run its own events.
- F1000 Pro Series (2009-2013) - Ran events on the West Coast before merging with F1000 Championship to form US Formula 1000 Championship.
- US Formula 1000 Championship (2013-2016) - Ran events in conjunction with SCCA Majors

== See also ==
Professional Formula 1000 Racing Series

- Australian Formula 1000
- North American Formula 1000 Championship
