= 2026 F1600 Championship Series =

16th season of the F1600 Championship Series

2026 F1600 season

Season
- Races: 21
- Start date: March 12
- End date: October 18

Awards
- Drivers' champion: (Canada) Boss Patel
- Manufacturers' Cup: (United States) Piper

The 2026 F1600 Championship Series season was the fifteenth season of the F1600 Championship Series.

The prior year's winner was Ayrton Cahan from Eric Langbein Racing.

== Drivers and teams ==
Pro Division
Team/Sponsor	No.	Drivers	Class	Rounds	Chassis	Engine
Rehm Racing	03	(United States) Greg Peluso	M	1–9, 13–18	Mygale	
Rehm Racing	9	(United States) Robert Stowell	M	1–3, 19–21	Spectrum	
Rehm Racing	9	(Canada) Connor Clubine	R	10–12	Spectrum	Honda
Rehm Racing	12	(United States) Bob Reid	M	1–18	Spectrum	
(United States) K-Hill Motorsports	06	(United States) David Ybarra	R	1–11, 13–21	Mygale	Honda
(United States) K-Hill Motorsports	06	(United States) David Adorno	M	12	Mygale	Honda
(United States) K-Hill Motorsports	33	(United States) David Adorno	M	1–11, 13–21	Mygale	Honda
(United States) K-Hill Motorsports	3	(United States) Jake LeRoy	R	All	Mygale	Honda
(United States) K-Hill Motorsports	75	(United States) Axel LeRoy	R	All	Mygale	Honda
Eric Langbein Racing	1	(United States) Aryan Narola	R	13–15	Piper	Ford
Eric Langbein Racing	5	(United States) John Thompson	M	1–6, 13–15, 19–21	Piper	
Eric Langbein Racing	23	(United States) Robert Dusek III	R	16–21	Ray FF	
Eric Langbein Racing	72	(United States) Steve Oseth	M	1–6, 10–21	Citation	
Brian Graham Racing	4	(Canada) Christian Menezes	R	1–6, 10–21	Piper	Honda
Brian Graham Racing	4	(Canada) Christian Menezes	R	7–9	Van Diemen	Honda
Brian Graham Racing	6	(Canada) Boss Patel	R	All	Piper	Honda
John Dole Racing	8	(United States) John Dole	M	4–6, 10–12	Ray FF	
John Dole Racing	91	(United States) John P Dole		4–6, 10–15	Mygale	Honda
(United States) Raceworks	10	(United States) John Kierce		1–6, 13–15, 19–21	Van Diemen	
(United States) Raceworks	11	(United States) Christopher Kierce		13–15	Spectrum	Honda
(United States) Raceworks	70	(United States) Christopher Kierce		19–21	Spectrum	Honda
(United States) Raceworks	70	(United States) Sam Lockwood	M	1–3, 13–15	Spectrum	
Dietz Motorsports /Polestar Motorsports	18	(United States) Robert Dietz		4–6	Van Diemen	Honda
Dietz Motorsports /Polestar Motorsports	22	(United States) James Dietz	M	4–6	Van Diemen	Honda
(United States) Drivers Services	18	(United States) Gary Gecelter	M	1–3	Spectrum	
(United States) Drivers Services	26	(United States) Charles Anti	M	16–18	Van Diemen	Honda
Iron Rock Motorsports	37	(United States) Clayton Stiles	R	19–21	Piper	
Iron Rock Motorsports	38	(Mexico) Nicolas Orbezo	R	19–21	Piper	
Wright Racing	94	(United States) Jonathan Farmer	R	1–9	Ray FF	
Wright Racing	94	(United States) Hugh Esterson		19–21	Ray FF	
Partstop Spectrum	2	(United States) Mike Scanlan	M	1–6, 10–15	Spectrum	
Holeshot Sportswear	8	(United States) Jack Haydu		7–9	Van Diemen	
Holeshot Sportswear	16	(United States) Jack Haydu		1–3	Van Diemen	
Holeshot Sportswear	81	(United States) Jack Haydu		4–6	Van Diemen	
Snaplaunch.AI	17	(United States) Cooper Travis		All	Spectrum	Honda
Shady Hill Clayworks	21	(United States) Dave Petzko	M	1–6, 10–15	Spectrum	Honda
Maisey Racing	22	(United States) Mark Walthew	R M	13–15	Ray FF	
Practical Precision Engineering	30	(United States) Will Velkoff		4–6, 10–15	Van Diemen	
AJMoto	31	(United States) Scott Rubenzer	M	1–15, 19–21	Spectrum	
(United States) Auriana Racing	32	(United States) Joe Colasacco	M	10–12	Van Diemen	
privater	32	(United States) Neil Radloff	G M	16–18	Spectrum	
Kingham Racing	47	(United States) Phil Kingham	M	4–15	Spectrum	
Mitchell Motors	52	(United States) Jack Herberger	G	4–6	Vorscha	
Averill Racing Stuff	62	(United States) Robert Gross	M	4–12	Piper	Honda
Bob Perona Motorsport	73	(United States) Roman McCurdy		1–6, 15–21	Piper	
ThermaMasters	85	(United States) David Livingston Jr.	M	1–12, 19–21	Spectrum	

Icon	Class
M	Masters
R	Rookie
G	Guest

== Schedule ==
Rd.	Date	Track	Location
–	January 21–22	Sebring International Raceway	Sebring, Florida
1	March 13–15	Michelin Raceway Road Atlanta	(Georgia (U.S. state)) Braselton, Georgia
2	March 13–15	Michelin Raceway Road Atlanta	(Georgia (U.S. state)) Braselton, Georgia
3	March 13–15	Michelin Raceway Road Atlanta	(Georgia (U.S. state)) Braselton, Georgia
4	April 24–26	Mid-Ohio Sports Car Course	Lexington, Ohio
5	April 24–26	Mid-Ohio Sports Car Course	Lexington, Ohio
6	April 24–26	Mid-Ohio Sports Car Course	Lexington, Ohio
7	June 26–28	Road America	Plymouth, Wisconsin
8	June 26–28	Road America	Plymouth, Wisconsin
9	June 26–28	Road America	Plymouth, Wisconsin
10	July 17–19	Watkins Glen International	(New York (state)) Dix, New York
11	July 17–19	Watkins Glen International	(New York (state)) Dix, New York
12	July 17–19	Watkins Glen International	(New York (state)) Dix, New York
13	August 7–9	Summit Point Motorsports Park	Summit Point, West Virginia
14	August 7–9	Summit Point Motorsports Park	Summit Point, West Virginia
15	August 7–9	Summit Point Motorsports Park	Summit Point, West Virginia
16	August 28–30	Carolina Motorsports Park	Kershaw, South Carolina
17	August 28–30	Carolina Motorsports Park	Kershaw, South Carolina
18	August 28–30	Carolina Motorsports Park	Kershaw, South Carolina
19	October 16–18	Barber Motorsports Park	Birmingham, Alabama
20	October 16–18	Barber Motorsports Park	Birmingham, Alabama
21	October 16–18	Barber Motorsports Park	Birmingham, Alabama
References: Formula Race Promotions Announces 2026 Schedule

Test Days

== Results and performance summaries ==
Round	Circuit	Location	Date	Pole position	Fastest lap	Winning driver	Masters class winner	Supporting
1	Michelin Raceway Road Atlanta	(Georgia (U.S. state)) Braselton, Georgia	March 14	(Canada) Christian Menezes	(United States) Cooper Travis	(Canada) Boss Patel	(United States) David Adorno	F2000 Championship Series; Atlantic Championship; SVRA Sprint Series; Trans-Am Series; International GT; Ginetta Challenge Race Series
2	Michelin Raceway Road Atlanta	(Georgia (U.S. state)) Braselton, Georgia	March 15		(Canada) Boss Patel	(Canada) Christian Menezes	(United States) Scott Rubenzer	F2000 Championship Series; Atlantic Championship; SVRA Sprint Series; Trans-Am Series; International GT; Ginetta Challenge Race Series
3	Michelin Raceway Road Atlanta	(Georgia (U.S. state)) Braselton, Georgia	March 15		(United States) David Ybarra	(Canada) Christian Menezes	(United States) David Livingston Jr.	F2000 Championship Series; Atlantic Championship; SVRA Sprint Series; Trans-Am Series; International GT; Ginetta Challenge Race Series
4	Mid-Ohio Sports Car Course	Lexington, Ohio	April 25	(Canada) Boss Patel	(United States) John P Dole	(Canada) Boss Patel	(United States) Phil Kingham	F2000 Championship Series; Atlantic Championship; Formula Vee Challenge Cup Series
5	Mid-Ohio Sports Car Course	Lexington, Ohio	April 26		(Canada) Christian Menezes	(Canada) Boss Patel	(United States) Scott Rubenzer	F2000 Championship Series; Atlantic Championship; Formula Vee Challenge Cup Series
6	Mid-Ohio Sports Car Course	Lexington, Ohio	April 26		(United States) Axel LeRoy	(Canada) Christian Menezes	(United States) David Adorno	F2000 Championship Series; Atlantic Championship; Formula Vee Challenge Cup Series
7	Road America	Plymouth, Wisconsin	June 27	(United States) Cooper Travis	(United States) Cooper Travis	(United States) David Livingston Jr.	(United States) David Livingston Jr.	F2000 Championship Series; Atlantic Championship; Porsche GT3 Cup Trophy USA; Trans-Am Series
8	Road America	Plymouth, Wisconsin	June 28		(United States) David Ybarra	(United States) David Ybarra	(United States) Phil Kingham	F2000 Championship Series; Atlantic Championship; Porsche GT3 Cup Trophy USA; Trans-Am Series
9	Road America	Plymouth, Wisconsin	June 28		(United States) David Ybarra	(United States) David Ybarra	(United States) David Livingston Jr.	F2000 Championship Series; Atlantic Championship; Porsche GT3 Cup Trophy USA; Trans-Am Series
10	Watkins Glen International	(New York (state)) Dix, New York	July 18	(Canada) Connor Clubine	(United States) Cooper Travis	(Canada) Christian Menezes	(United States) David Adorno	F2000 Championship Series; Atlantic Championship; Porsche GT3 Cup Trophy USA; Trans-Am Series
11	Watkins Glen International	(New York (state)) Dix, New York	July 19		(Canada) Christian Menezes	(United States) Cooper Travis	(United States) Phil Kingham	F2000 Championship Series; Atlantic Championship; Porsche GT3 Cup Trophy USA; Trans-Am Series
12	Watkins Glen International	(New York (state)) Dix, New York	July 19		(Canada) Christian Menezes	(Canada) Boss Patel	(United States) Phil Kingham	F2000 Championship Series; Atlantic Championship; Porsche GT3 Cup Trophy USA; Trans-Am Series
13	Summit Point Motorsports Park	Summit Point, West Virginia	August 8	(United States) Cooper Travis	(United States) John P Dole	(United States) David Ybarra	(United States) David Adorno	F2000 Championship Series; Atlantic Championship; Formula Vee Challenge Cup Series
14	Summit Point Motorsports Park	Summit Point, West Virginia	August 9		(Canada) Boss Patel	(United States) David Ybarra	(United States) David Adorno	F2000 Championship Series; Atlantic Championship; Formula Vee Challenge Cup Series
15	Summit Point Motorsports Park	Summit Point, West Virginia	August 9		(United States) David Ybarra	(United States) David Ybarra	(United States) Scott Rubenzer	F2000 Championship Series; Atlantic Championship; Formula Vee Challenge Cup Series
16	Carolina Motorsports Park	Kershaw, South Carolina	August 29	(United States) Cooper Travis	(United States) Cooper Travis	(United States) Cooper Travis	(United States) Charles Anti	F2000 Championship Series; Atlantic Championship; Formula Vee Challenge Cup Series
17	Carolina Motorsports Park	Kershaw, South Carolina	August 30		(United States) Cooper Travis	(United States) Cooper Travis	(United States) David Adorno	F2000 Championship Series; Atlantic Championship; Formula Vee Challenge Cup Series
18	Carolina Motorsports Park	Kershaw, South Carolina	August 30		(United States) David Ybarra	(United States) David Adorno	(United States) David Adorno	F2000 Championship Series; Atlantic Championship; Formula Vee Challenge Cup Series
19	Barber Motorsports Park	Birmingham, Alabama	October 17	(United States) Cooper Travis	(United States) Cooper Travis	(United States) David Ybarra	(United States) David Adorno	F2000 Championship Series; Atlantic Championship; Formula Regional Americas Championship; Formula 4 United States Championship; Ligier Junior Formula Championship; SVRA Sprint Series
20	Barber Motorsports Park	Birmingham, Alabama	October 18		(United States) Robert Dusek III	(United States) David Ybarra	(United States) David Adorno	F2000 Championship Series; Atlantic Championship; Formula Regional Americas Championship; Formula 4 United States Championship; Ligier Junior Formula Championship; SVRA Sprint Series
21	Barber Motorsports Park	Birmingham, Alabama	October 18		(United States) Cooper Travis	(United States) David Ybarra	(United States) David Adorno	F2000 Championship Series; Atlantic Championship; Formula Regional Americas Championship; Formula 4 United States Championship; Ligier Junior Formula Championship; SVRA Sprint Series

== Scoring system ==
Points are awarded to the top twenty-five classified drivers, and the top drivers who are able to achieve the Pole Position or the Fastest Lap during the qualify session are awarded with corresponding +3 and +2 bonus points.

The Season Championship will recognize only each driver's best 18 of 21 race results including all bonus points earned.

The weekend format and with it the points system were overhauled for the 2026 season. Each weekend will now comprise three races, the first two of which are designated as Heat Races and award points per class according to the following scale.

Position	1st	2nd	3rd	4th	5th	6th	7th	8th	9th	10th	11th	12th	13th	14th	15th	16th	17th	18th+	DNF
Points	25	23	21	19	17	15	13	11	10	9	8	7	6	5	4	3	2	1	1

Race 3

The third race of the weekend, called the Feature Race, awards more points:

Position	1st	2nd	3rd	4th	5th	6th	7th	8th	9th	10th	11th	12th	13th	14th	15th	16th	17th	18th	19th	20th	21st	22nd	23rd	24th	25th+	DNF
Points	50	42	37	34	31	29	27	25	23	21	19	17	15	13	11	10	9	8	7	6	5	4	3	2	1	1

Guest drivers are ineligible to score points.

== Driver standings ==
Pos	Driver	RAT			MOH			RA			WGI			SP			CMP			BAR			Pts	Drop Points
1	(Canada) Boss Patel	1	2	4	**1**	1	12	4	2	3	4	15	1	2	2	3	4	4	2	2	2	4	551	511
2	(United States) Cooper Travis	3	DNF	3	3	4	6 (Note: 17 Found in violation of: 1.6.17.3: AVOIDABLE CONTACT. Loss of 10 Race points & purse.)	**2**	3	2	3	1	2	**3**	3	5	**1**	1	10 (Note: 17 Found in violation of: 1.6.17.5: SAFE PASS & 1.6.17.3: AVOIDABLE CONTACT. Loss of 15 Race points.) (Note: 17 Found in violation of: 1.6.17.3: AVOIDABLE CONTACT. Loss of 10 Race points.)	**8**	4	5	498	488
3	(United States) David Ybarra	2	15	2	2	12	7 (Note: 06 Found in violation of: 1.6.17.3: AVOIDABLE CONTACT. Loss of 15 Race points & purse.)	11	1	1	2	3 (Note: 06 Found in violation of: 1.6.17.3: AVOIDABLE CONTACT & 1.6.17.4: RACING ROOM & Unsportsmanlike Conduct. Loss of 15 Race Points & Suspension for 1 race: Championship Race at WGI.)	DSQ	1	1	1	2	5	13	1	1	1	488	478
4	(Canada) Christian Menezes	**11**	1	1	6	3	1	6	6	6	1	2	3	16	19	4	5	12	3	15 (Note: 4 Found in violation of: 1.6.17.5: SAFE PASS & 1.6.17.3: AVOIDABLE CONTACT. Loss of 10 Race Points.)	5	DNF	433	437
5	(United States) David Adorno	4	17	8	DNF	11	2	12 (Note: 33 Found in violation of: 1.6.17.3: AVOIDABLE CONTACT. Loss of 15 Race points.)	8	DNF	5	17	10	5	5	19	DNF	2 (Note: 33 Found in violation of: 1.6.17.5: SAFE PASS & 1.6.17.3: AVOIDABLE CONTACT. Loss of 15 Race points & formal reprimand.)	1	5	3	2	321	327
6	(United States) Jake LeRoy	6	4 (Note: 3 Found in violation of: 1.6.17.3: AVOIDABLE CONTACT. Loss of 15 Race points.)	5	22	9	DNF	8	DNF	7	8	5	6	15	DNF	7	6	8	4	3	7	3	321	318
7	(United States) Axel LeRoy	5	10	16 (Note: 75 Found in violation of: 1.6.17.3: AVOIDABLE CONTACT. Loss of 15 Race points.)	9	23 (Note: 75 Found in violation of: 1.6.17.3: AVOIDABLE CONTACT. Loss of 15 Race points.)	4	7	4 (Note: 75 Found in violation of: 1.6.17.3: AVOIDABLE CONTACT. Loss of 10 Race points.)	9	14	16	4	6	7	6	3	9	11	6 (Note: 75 Found in violation of: 1.6.17.3: AVOIDABLE CONTACT. Loss of 10 Race points.)	16	6	284	300
8	(United States) Bob Reid	12	7	11	8	7	DNF	5	7	8	11	9	8	9	10	11	10	10	7				245	245
9	(United States) Steve Oseth	8	8	9	12	14	10				10	8	17	8	9	10	8	7	5	12	13	11	236	236
10	(United States) David Livingston Jr.	10	5	6	11	8	9	1	11	4	19	11	12							9	12	13	222	222
11	(United States) Phil Kingham				4	6	DNF	3	5	5	12	6	7	11	11	9							192	192
12	(United States) Scott Rubenzer	7	3	DNF	5	5	5	DNS	DNS	DNS	17	10	11	7	8	8				10	DNF	DNS	189	189
13	(United States) John P Dole				7	2	18				6	19	DNF	4	4	2							145	145
14	(United States) John Thompson	9	9	7	10	10	8							10	DNF (Note: 5 Found in violation of: 1.6.17.3: AVOIDABLE CONTACT & 1.6.17.5: SAFE PASS. Loss of 10 Race points & formal reprimand.)	12				13	14	14	131	140
15	(United States) Robert Dusek III																DNF	3	12	4	6	8	100	100
16	(United States) Roman McCurdy	17	6	10	DNF	DNF	DNF										9	11	8	7	DNF	DNS	98	98
17	(United States) Greg Peluso	DNF	DNS	Wth	Wth			9	10	10				17	16	15	11	13	9				94	94
18	(United States) Dave Petzko	DNF	12	12	18	18	16				15	12	14	12	14	DNF							74	74
19	(Canada) Connor Clubine										**7**	4	5										66	66
20	(United States) John Kierce	18	DNS	DNS	19	15	14							DSQ (Note: 10 Found to be in violation for being UNDERWEIGHT. Disqualification in Race 1 and loss of qualifying lap times for Race 2.)	13	14				17	15	10	65	65
21	(United States) Mike Scanlan	DNF (Note: 2 Found in violation of: 1.6.17.3: AVOIDABLE CONTACT & 1.6.17.5: SAFE PASS. Loss of 15 Race points.)	13	14	15	21	17				18	13	15 (Note: 2 Found in violation of: 1.6.17.5: SAFE PASS. Loss of 15 Race points.)	13	15	16							42	60
22	(United States) Charles Anti																7	6	6				57	57
23	(United States) Will Velkoff				13	22	DNF				13	DNF	13	DNF	12	13							53	53
24	(United States) Joe Colasacco										9	7	9										46	46
25	(United States) Christopher Kierce													19	17	DNF				11	10	9	44	44
26	(United States) Robert Dietz				14	24	3																43	43
27	(United States) Clayton Stiles																			14	11	7	40	40
28	(United States) Jack Haydu	DNS	DNS	Wth	16	17	13	10	9	DNF													40	40
29	(United States) Jonathan Farmer	16	14	DNS	DNF	13	11	DNS	DNS	DNS													34	34
30	(Mexico) Nicolas Orbezo																			16	8	12	31	31
31	(United States) Gary Gecelter	13	11	13																			29	29
32	(United States) Aryan Narola													14	6	18							28	28
33	(United States) Robert Gross				20	20	19				20	14	16										25	25
34	(United States) Sam Lockwood	15	16	15										DNS	DNS	DNS							18	18
35	(United States) James Dietz				21	16	15																15	15
36	(United States) John Dole				17	19	20				16	18	DNF										14	14
37	(United States) Mark Walthew													18	18	17							11	11
38	(United States) Hugh Esterson																			DNS	9	DNS	10	10
39	(United States) Robert Stowell	14	DNS	DNS																Wth			5	5
Drivers ineligible for points
	(United States) Jack Herberger				Wth																			
	(United States) Neil Radloff																Wth							
Pos	Driver	RAT			MOH			RA			WGI			SP			CMP			BAR			Pts	Drop Points
References: FRP Official Points Standings & Championship Series Central & Race Monitor

Color	Result
Gold	Winner
Silver	2nd-place finish
Bronze	3rd-place finish
Green	Top 5 finish
Light Blue	Top 10 finish
Dark Blue	Other flagged position
Purple	Did not finish (DNF)
Brown	Withdrew (Wth)
Pink	Unqualified Car (CNQ)
Black	Disqualified (DSQ)
White	Did Not Start (DNS)
White	Race abandoned (C)
Blank	Did not participate

**In-line notation**
**Bold**	Pole position (3 points)
Italics	Fastest lap of the race (2 points)

Master of the Year
Masters

== Incident reports ==
- Road Atlanta 2026 - Incident Review/Penalty Report
- Mid-Ohio 2026 - Incident Review/Penalty Report
- Road America 2026 - Incident Review/Penalty Report
- WGI 2026 - Incident Review/Penalty Report
- Summit Point 2026 - Incident Review/Penalty Report
- CMP 2026 - Incident Review/Penalty Report
- Barber 2026 - Incident Review/Penalty Report

== Live streaming on YouTube ==
- Road America:

Qualifying Session of Road America: 6.27.26 9 AM ET - Saturday Morning Sessions at Road America (WI)
Heat Race 1 of Road America: 6.27.26 1:30 PM ET - Saturday Afternoon Sessions at Road America (WI)
Heat Race 2 of Road America: 6.28.26 - 9AM ET - International GT and FRP F1600 at Road America (WI)
Feature Race of Road America: 6.28.26 - 3:35PM ET - FRP F-1600 / FRP F-2000 at Road America (WI)

- Watkins Glen:

Free Practice 1 of Watkins Glen: 7.17.26 - 8:30AM - Friday Morning Sessions at Watkins Glen (NY)
Free Practice 2 of Watkins Glen: 7.17.26 - 1:10PM - Friday Afternoon Sessions at Watkins Glen (NY)
Heat Race 1 of Watkins Glen: 7.18.26 - 3:00PM - Saturday Afternoon Racing at Watkins Glen (NY)
Heat Race 2 of Watkins Glen: 7.19.26 - 12:30PM - FRP F1600 Race 2 at Watkins Glen (NY)
Feature Race of Road America: 7.19.26 - 4:10PM - FRP F1600, Formula Atlantic, FE2 Races at Watkins Glen (NY)

== See also ==
- 2026 F2000 Championship Series
- 2026 Atlantic Championship
