= 2026 F2000 Championship Series =

15th season of the F2000 Championship Series

2026 F2000 Championship Series season

Season
- Races: 14
- Start date: March 12
- End date: October 18

Awards
- Drivers' champion: Robert Wright

The 2026 F2000 Championship Series season was the fifteenth season of the F2000 Championship Series. It was held over twenty races across seven race weekends.

The season began on March 12 at Road Atlanta and finished on October 18 at Barber Motorsports Park. Wright Racing's Robert Wright won the championship title with three races to spare.

== Drivers and teams ==
Team	No.	Driver	Car	Rounds
Auriana Racing	2	(United States) Joe Colasacco	Van Diemen FC	4
Layke MotorSports	03	(United States) Carter Sheets	2003 Van Diemen F2000	1–5
BBR Racing	4	(United States) David Otte	2001 Van Diemen RF01	3
England Racing	5	(United States) Ron Hornig	1971 Brabham BT35-18	7
England Racing	83	(United States) Geoff Brabham	1971 Brabham BT35	7
privateer	6	(United States) Steve Egger	Brabham BT35 - 26	7
USNG Racing	11	(United States) Zain Khan	Ligier JS F4	2
Arrive Drive Motorsport	11	(United States) Gary Laughlin	Ligier JS F4	5
Arrive Drive Motorsport	11	(United States) David Adorno	Ligier JS F4	6
Arrive Drive Motorsport	96	(Canada) Nick Gilkes	2012 Van Diemen	1
Arrive Drive Motorsport	97	(United States) Dustin Hodges	2012 Elan DP08 F2000	5
Momentum Motorsports	35	(United States) Eric Presbrey	2000 Van Diemen RF03	6–7
Palm Rat Golf	38	(United States) Ethan Alexander	1999 Van Diemen RF99	3
Fahan Paving	39	(United States) Chris Fahan	2002 Van Diemen RF02	5
privateer	47	(United States) Chris Monteleone	2010 Carbir DS3	4
Weitzenhof Racing	67	(United States) Dave Weitzenhof	1995 Citation 95SFZ	1–4
Audien Hearing	68	(United States) Steve Jenks	Metrik ZF2	1
Personal Wealth Solutions	72	(United States) Jeremy Swank	2005 Van Diemen RF05	2
privateer	76	(United States) Steve Yarborough	1989 Swift FC	7
Wright Racing	90	(United States) Robert Wright	2012 Elan DP08	All
Wright Racing	95	(Pakistan) Arshia Akhtar	2002 Van Diemen RF02	1
privateer	95	(United States) Thomas Fatur	2002 Van Diemen F2000	4

== Schedule ==
The race schedule was announced on November 25, 2025. Pittsburgh International Race Complex dropped off the schedule after the track was closed down, and New Jersey Motorsports Park was also not featured, with the series instead returning to Carolina Motorsports Park and to Barber Motorsports Park for the first time since 2022.

Round		Circuit	Date	Support bill	Map of circuit locations
1	H1	Road Atlanta, Braselton	March 14	SVRA Sprint Series; Trans-Am Series; Porsche GT3 Cup Trophy USA	2026 F2000 Championship Series is located in the United States
1	H2	Road Atlanta, Braselton	March 15	SVRA Sprint Series; Trans-Am Series; Porsche GT3 Cup Trophy USA	2026 F2000 Championship Series is located in the United States
1	FR	Road Atlanta, Braselton	March 15	SVRA Sprint Series; Trans-Am Series; Porsche GT3 Cup Trophy USA	2026 F2000 Championship Series is located in the United States
2	H1	Mid-Ohio Sports Car Course, Lexington	April 25	FRP race weekend Formula Ford Challenge Series; Formula Vee Challenge Cup Series; Vintage Sports 2000 North America	2026 F2000 Championship Series is located in the United States
2	H2	Mid-Ohio Sports Car Course, Lexington	April 26	FRP race weekend Formula Ford Challenge Series; Formula Vee Challenge Cup Series; Vintage Sports 2000 North America	2026 F2000 Championship Series is located in the United States
2	FR	Mid-Ohio Sports Car Course, Lexington	April 26	FRP race weekend Formula Ford Challenge Series; Formula Vee Challenge Cup Series; Vintage Sports 2000 North America	2026 F2000 Championship Series is located in the United States
3	H1	Road America, Elkhart Lake	June 27	Trans-Am Series; Porsche GT3 Cup Trophy USA	2026 F2000 Championship Series is located in the United States
3	H2	Road America, Elkhart Lake	June 28	Trans-Am Series; Porsche GT3 Cup Trophy USA	2026 F2000 Championship Series is located in the United States
3	FR	Road America, Elkhart Lake	June 28	Trans-Am Series; Porsche GT3 Cup Trophy USA	2026 F2000 Championship Series is located in the United States
4	H1	Watkins Glen International, Watkins Glen	July 18	Trans-Am Series; Porsche GT3 Cup Trophy USA; Formula Continental Challenge Series	2026 F2000 Championship Series is located in the United States
4	H2	Watkins Glen International, Watkins Glen	July 19	Trans-Am Series; Porsche GT3 Cup Trophy USA; Formula Continental Challenge Series	2026 F2000 Championship Series is located in the United States
4	FR	Watkins Glen International, Watkins Glen	July 19	Trans-Am Series; Porsche GT3 Cup Trophy USA; Formula Continental Challenge Series	2026 F2000 Championship Series is located in the United States
5	H1	Summit Point Motorsports Park, Summit Point	August 8	FRP race weekend	2026 F2000 Championship Series is located in the United States
5	H2	Summit Point Motorsports Park, Summit Point	August 9	FRP race weekend	2026 F2000 Championship Series is located in the United States
5	FR	Summit Point Motorsports Park, Summit Point	August 9	FRP race weekend	2026 F2000 Championship Series is located in the United States
6	H1	Carolina Motorsports Park, Kershaw	August 29	FRP race weekend	2026 F2000 Championship Series is located in the United States
6	H2	Carolina Motorsports Park, Kershaw	August 30	FRP race weekend	2026 F2000 Championship Series is located in the United States
6	FR	Carolina Motorsports Park, Kershaw	August 30	FRP race weekend	2026 F2000 Championship Series is located in the United States
7	H1	Barber Motorsports Park, Birmingham	October 16–18	SVRA Sprint Series; Formula Regional Americas Championship	2026 F2000 Championship Series is located in the United States
7	FR	Barber Motorsports Park, Birmingham	October 16–18	SVRA Sprint Series; Formula Regional Americas Championship	2026 F2000 Championship Series is located in the United States

== Race results ==
Round		Circuit	Pole position	Fastest lap	Winning driver	Winning team
1	H1	Road Atlanta	(United States) Dave Weitzenhof	(Canada) Nick Gilkes	(Canada) Nick Gilkes	Arrive Drive Motorsport
1	H2	Road Atlanta		(Canada) Nick Gilkes	(United States) Robert Wright	Wright Racing
1	FR	Road Atlanta		(Canada) Nick Gilkes	(Canada) Nick Gilkes	Arrive Drive Motorsport
2	H1	Mid-Ohio Sports Car Course	(United States) Jeremy Swank	(United States) Carter Sheets	(United States) Carter Sheets	Layke MotorSports
2	H2	Mid-Ohio Sports Car Course		(United States) Jeremy Swank	(United States) Carter Sheets	Layke MotorSports
2	FR	Mid-Ohio Sports Car Course		(United States) Jeremy Swank	(United States) Jeremy Swank	Personal Wealth Solutions
3	H1	Road America	(United States) David Otte	(United States) David Otte	(United States) David Otte	BBR Racing
3	H2	Road America		(United States) David Otte	(United States) David Otte	BBR Racing
3	FR	Road America		(United States) David Otte	(United States) Carter Sheets	Layke MotorSports
4	H1	Watkins Glen International	(United States) Carter Sheets (Note: Qualifying for round four was cancelled due to adverse weather. No points for pole position were awarded.)	(United States) Joe Colasacco	(United States) Robert Wright	Wright Racing
4	H2	Watkins Glen International		declared non-race after delay due to a crash		
4	FR	Watkins Glen International		(United States) Joe Colasacco	(United States) Joe Colasacco	Auriana Racing
5	H1	Summit Point Motorsports Park	(United States) Robert Wright	race cancelled due to inclement weather		
5	H2	Summit Point Motorsports Park		(United States) Chris Fahan	(United States) Chris Fahan	Fahan Paving
5	FR	Summit Point Motorsports Park		(United States) Chris Fahan	(United States) Chris Fahan	Fahan Paving
6	H1	Carolina Motorsports Park	(United States) Robert Wright	(United States) Eric Presbrey	(United States) Eric Presbrey	Momentum Motorsports
6	H2	Carolina Motorsports Park		(United States) Eric Presbrey	(United States) Eric Presbrey	Momentum Motorsports
6	FR	Carolina Motorsports Park		(United States) Eric Presbrey	(United States) Eric Presbrey	Momentum Motorsports
7	H1	Barber Motorsports Park	(United States) Robert Wright	(United States) Eric Presbrey	(United States) Eric Presbrey	Momentum Motorsports
7	FR	Barber Motorsports Park		(United States) Eric Presbrey	(United States) Robert Wright	Wright Racing

== Season report ==
The 2026 F2000 Championship Series started in March at Road Atlanta with Arrive Drive Motorsport driver Nick Gilkes taking pole position in qualifying. Five cars started the first heat race, in which Gilkes converted his pole position into a victory ahead of Layke MotorSports driver Carter Sheets and Wright Racing's Robert Wright. The latter of these was then able to beat the three-car field in a damp heat race two, consigning Gilkes to second place, with third taken by Wright's teammate Arshia Akhtar. Only Gilkes and Wright started the feature race, and it was Gilkes who took victory to leave Road Atlanta leading Wright by 19 points in the championship standings.

Round two, held at the Mid-Ohio Sports Car Course, saw pole position go to Personal Wealth Solutions driver Jeremy Swank. However, he was unable to finish the first heat race, leaving Sheets to take victory ahead of Weitzenhof Racing's Dave Weitzenhof and Wright. Sheets doubled up in heat race two, with Swank bouncing back from his retirement and taking second as Weitzenhof completed the podium. The feature race brought victory for Sheets after all as he narrowly beat Sheets to the win and Weizenhof came third again. Pre-event points leader Gilkes did not enter the round and therefore dropped to third in the standings. Wright was the beneficiary and now led Sheets by 45 points.

‍Road America hosted round three, and it began with remarkable performances for a series rookie as debutant David Otte bested the five-car field in qualifying to take pole position for BBR Racing. He continued his pace by winning the first heat race. Sheets and Wright took second and third on the road, before post-race penalties for both elevated Weitzenhof to second place. The second heat race saw a similar picture as Otte was once again closely shadowed by Sheets, before he took another victory by 0.045 seconds. The feature race then saw Sheets finally able to get past Otte and take victory. With Wright taking third, Sheets was able to close up to 30 points behind him in the standings.

The season reached its halfway point around Watkins Glen International. The weekend was disrupted by thunderstorms and crashes throughout, with the F2000 qualifying session cancelled and its races combined with the Atlantic Championship's field. The F2000 win in the first race went to championship leader Wright, with series returnee Joe Colasacco taking second for Auriana Racing and Weitzenhof taking third. The second race was declared a non-event after a heavy crash between Weitzenhof and privateer Chris Monteleone saw only five laps completed. That meant Colasacco's on-track win was voided, but he bounced back in the feature race to take victory as the sole finisher in his class.

Round five at Summit Point Motorsports Park brought more weather-induced disruptions, as the first heat race was cancelled after Wright took pole position for it in qualifying. When racing got underway on Sunday with the second heat race, Wright was unable to defend his starting position as Fahan Paving's Chris Fahan overtook him to claim a debut victory. Arrive Drive Motorsport's Dustin Hodges completed the podium, also on debut. The feature race saw no change to the top two, with Fahan claiming another victory while Wright in second grew his championship lead to 107 over Sheets after the latter withdrew from the weekend. This time, third went to Arrive Drive Motorsport's Gary Laughlin.

Only three drivers entered the penultimate round at Carolina Motorsports Park, and three became two when Arrive Drive's David Adorno withdrew. That left only championship leader Wright and Momentum Motorsports' series returnee Eric Presbrey, and the former claimed pole position in qualifying. Presbrey had the superior race pace, however, as he passed Wright to take victory. Wright then did not start the second heat race, leaving Presbrey to take another victory without opposition, before the battle resumed in the feature race. Presbrey came out on top again to sweep the weekend, but with no other drivers attending the event, second place allowed Wright to seal the championship title.

The final weekend at Barber Motorsports Park saw only one heat race held ahead of the feature race. Wright took pole position, but lost out to Presbrey in the race, who took his fourth victory in a row as England Racing's Geoff Brabham took third. Presbrey then fell to fifth in the final feature race of the season, but set the fastest lap to clinch third in the standings by a single point. Wright ended his title-winning campaign with a victory as Brabham took second this time and privateer Steve Yarborough completed the podium.

== Standings ==
=== Scoring system ===
The weekend format and with it the points system were overhauled for the 2026 season. Each weekend now comprised three races, the first two of which were designated as Heat Races and awarded points per class according to the following scale.

Position	1st	2nd	3rd	4th	5th	6th	7th	8th	9th	10th	11th	12th	13th	14th	15th	16th	17th	18th+
Points	25	23	21	19	17	15	13	11	10	9	8	7	6	5	4	3	2	1

The third race of the weekend, called the Feature Race, awarded more points:

Position	1st	2nd	3rd	4th	5th	6th	7th	8th	9th	10th	11th	12th	13th	14th	15th	16th	17th	18th	19th	20th	21st	22nd	23rd	24th	25th+
Points	50	42	37	34	31	29	27	25	23	21	19	17	15	13	11	10	9	8	7	6	5	4	3	2	1

Three points were awarded for pole position, as well as two more points for the fastest lap per race.

=== Drivers' standings ===
Pos	Driver	ATL			MOH			ROA			WGL			SUM			CAR			BAR		Pts
Pos	Driver	R1	R2	R3	R1	R2	R3	R1	R2	R3	R1	R2	R3	R1	R2	R3	R1	R2	R3	R1	R2	Pts
1	(United States) Robert Wright	3	1	2	3	(4)	4	3	4	3	1	C	(DNS)	**C**	2	2	**2**	(DNS)	2	**2**	1	476
2	(United States) Carter Sheets	2	DNS	DNS	1	1	2	4†	2	1	6	C	Ret	C	WD	WD						225
3	(United States) Eric Presbrey																1	1	1	1	5	166
4	(United States) Dave Weitzenhof	4	DNS	WD	2	3	3	2	3	DNS	3	C	DNS									165
5	(Canada) Nick Gilkes	**1**	2	1																		107
6	(United States) David Otte							**1**	1	2												101
7	(United States) Jeremy Swank				**Ret**	2	1															81
8	(United States) Chris Fahan													C	1	1						79
9	(United States) Joe Colasacco										2	C	1									77
10	(United States) Geoff Brabham																			3	2	63
11	(United States) Gary Laughlin													C	4	3						56
12	(United States) Steve Yarborough																			4	3	56
13	(United States) Ethan Alexander							Ret	5	4												52
14	(United States) Ron Hornig																			5	4	51
15	(United States) Steve Egger																			6	6	44
16	(Pakistan) Arshia Akhtar	5	3	DNS																		38
17	(United States) Dustin Hodges													C	3	Ret						22
18	(United States) Chris Monteleone										4	C	DNS									19
19	(United States) Thomas Fatur										5	C	Ret									18
—	(United States) Steve Jenks	DNS	WD	WD																		0
—	(United States) Zain Khan				DNS	WD	WD															0
—	(United States) David Adorno																WD	WD	WD			0
Pos	Driver	R1	R2	R3	R1	R2	R3	R1	R2	R3	R1	R2	R3	R1	R2	R3	R1	R2	R3	R1	R2	Pts
Pos	Driver	ATL			MOH			ROA			WGL			SUM			CAR			BAR		Pts

Colour	Result
Gold	Winner
Silver	Second place
Bronze	Third place
Green	Points classification
Blue	Non-points classification
Blue	Non-classified finish (NC)
Purple	Retired, not classified (Ret)
Red	Did not qualify (DNQ)
Red	Did not pre-qualify (DNPQ)
Black	Disqualified (DSQ)
White	Did not start (DNS)
White	Withdrew (WD)
White	Race cancelled (C)
Blank	Did not practice (DNP)
Blank	Did not arrive (DNA)
Blank	Excluded (EX)

**Bold** – Pole

Italics – Fastest Lap

* – Penalty

== See also ==
- 2026 Atlantic Championship
- 2026 F1600 Championship Series
