= 2026 Atlantic Championship =

Motorsport racing series

2026 Atlantic Championship Series season

Season
- Races: 14
- Start date: March 12
- End date: October 18

Awards
- 016 Class Champion Open Class Champion: Harbir Dass; Nicho Vardis

The 2026 Atlantic Championship Series season was the thirteenth season of the revived Atlantic Championship. The series was organized by Formula Race Promotions and sanctioned by SCCA Pro Racing.

The season was held over seven weekends from January to October 2026. K-Hill Motorsports driver Harbir Dass won the 016 Class championship title with three races to spare, while the title in the Open Class went to Vardis Motorsports' Nicho Vardis.

== Drivers and teams ==
Drivers competed in two classes, after the USF Juniors class that was established in 2025 received no entries: The 016 Class was only open to Swift 016a cars, while the Open Class served all other eligible entries. All teams and drivers were American-registered.

| Team | No. | Driver | Car | Rounds |
016 Class entries
| DrivenTires.com | 8 | Ryan Saari | 2006 Swift 016 | 2, 5 |
| DrivenTires.com | 8 | Vaughn Glace | 2006 Swift 016 | 4 |
| K-Hill Motorsports | 06 | Harbir Dass | 2006 Swift 016 | 3–6 |
| K-Hill Motorsports | 9 | Harbir Dass | 2006 Swift 016 | 1–2 |
| K-Hill Motorsports | 15 | Jean-Luc Liverato | 2006 Swift 016 | 7 |
| K-Hill Motorsports | 74 | Dudley Fleck | 2006 Swift 016 Mazda | 2–3 |
| privateer | 21 | Clay DellaCava | 2006 Swift 016 | 7 |
| Zober Industries Inc. | 66 | Richard Zober | 2006 Swift 016 Mazda | 4 |
| MotoNomaddicts | 68 | John McAleer | 2006 Swift 016 | 1–3 |
Open Class entries
| Johnston and Associates | 3 | Brett Johnston | 2004 Mazda Pro Mazda | 7 |
| Johnston and Associates | 73 | James Johnston Sr. | 2004 Swift 014 | 7 |
| Arrive Drive Motorsports | 3 | Dustin Hodges | 2018 JDR F1000 | 6 |
| Arrive Drive Motorsports | 33 | Drew Holtgraewe | 2018 JDR F1000 | 5–7 |
| Arrive Drive Motorsports | 07 | Austin Holtgraewe | 2025 JDR F1000 | 5 |
| Arrive Drive Motorsports | 33 | Ayrton Houk | 2018 JDR F1000 | 1 |
| Arrive Drive Motorsports | 39 | Tim Pierce | 2012 JDR F1000 | 1 |
| Arrive Drive Motorsports | 39 | Pierce Krone | 2012 JDR F1000 | 5 |
| K-Hill Motorsports | 4 | Jean-Luc Liverato | 2007 Dallara IPS | 1 |
| K-Hill Motorsports | 06 | Bruce Hamilton | 2001 Swift 014 MZR | 1, 5 |
| K-Hill Motorsports | 32 | Kirk Kindsfater | 2002 Swift 014.a | 4 |
| Forty 48 Competition | 46 | James French | 2001 Swift 014/CSR | 1, 3 |
| Forty 48 Competition | 71 | Jeffrey Antonelli | 2006 Star Pro Mazda | 3 |
| TF Companies | 21 | Whitney Strickland | 2025 Ligier JS F3 | 5 |
| Home Tech Consultants | 41 | Robert Albani | 2001 Swift 014 MZR | 1, 5 |
| Road Race Industries | 72 | Jim Johnston Jr. | 2004 Mazda Pro Mazda | 7 |
| Eric Langbein Racing | 80 | Jim Kelleher | 1980 March 80A | 7 |
| Vardis Motorsports | 00 | Nicho Vardis | 2013 JDR F1000 | 2–4, 7 |
| Team Tonis | 09 | J.R. Smart | 2002 Swift 014.a | 3 |

== Race calendar ==
The race schedule was announced on September 30, 2024. Pittsburgh International Race Complex dropped off the schedule after the track was closed down, and New Jersey Motorsports Park was also not featured, with the series instead debuting at the Carolina Motorsports Park and returning to Barber Motorsports Park for the first time since 2022.

| Round | | Circuit | Date | Support bill | Map of circuit locations |
|---|---|---|---|---|---|
| 1 | H1 | Road Atlanta, Braselton | March 14 | SVRA Sprint Series; Trans-Am Series; Porsche GT3 Cup Trophy USA | 2026 Atlantic Championship is located in the United States |
| 1 | H2 | Road Atlanta, Braselton | March 15 | SVRA Sprint Series; Trans-Am Series; Porsche GT3 Cup Trophy USA | 2026 Atlantic Championship is located in the United States |
| 1 | FR | Road Atlanta, Braselton | March 15 | SVRA Sprint Series; Trans-Am Series; Porsche GT3 Cup Trophy USA | 2026 Atlantic Championship is located in the United States |
| 2 | H1 | Mid-Ohio Sports Car Course, Lexington | April 25 | FRP race weekend Formula Ford Challenge Series; Formula Vee Challenge Cup Series; Vintage Sports 2000 North America | 2026 Atlantic Championship is located in the United States |
| 2 | H2 | Mid-Ohio Sports Car Course, Lexington | April 26 | FRP race weekend Formula Ford Challenge Series; Formula Vee Challenge Cup Series; Vintage Sports 2000 North America | 2026 Atlantic Championship is located in the United States |
| 2 | FR | Mid-Ohio Sports Car Course, Lexington | April 26 | FRP race weekend Formula Ford Challenge Series; Formula Vee Challenge Cup Series; Vintage Sports 2000 North America | 2026 Atlantic Championship is located in the United States |
| 3 | H1 | Road America, Elkhart Lake | June 27 | Trans-Am Series; Porsche GT3 Cup Trophy USA | 2026 Atlantic Championship is located in the United States |
| 3 | H2 | Road America, Elkhart Lake | June 28 | Trans-Am Series; Porsche GT3 Cup Trophy USA | 2026 Atlantic Championship is located in the United States |
| 3 | FR | Road America, Elkhart Lake | June 28 | Trans-Am Series; Porsche GT3 Cup Trophy USA | 2026 Atlantic Championship is located in the United States |
| 4 | H1 | Watkins Glen International, Watkins Glen | July 18 | Trans-Am Series; Porsche GT3 Cup Trophy USA; Formula Continental Challenge Series | 2026 Atlantic Championship is located in the United States |
| 4 | H2 | Watkins Glen International, Watkins Glen | July 18 | Trans-Am Series; Porsche GT3 Cup Trophy USA; Formula Continental Challenge Series | 2026 Atlantic Championship is located in the United States |
| 4 | FR | Watkins Glen International, Watkins Glen | July 19 | Trans-Am Series; Porsche GT3 Cup Trophy USA; Formula Continental Challenge Series | 2026 Atlantic Championship is located in the United States |
| 5 | H1 | Summit Point Motorsports Park, Summit Point | August 8 | FRP race weekend | 2026 Atlantic Championship is located in the United States |
| 5 | H2 | Summit Point Motorsports Park, Summit Point | August 9 | FRP race weekend | 2026 Atlantic Championship is located in the United States |
| 5 | FR | Summit Point Motorsports Park, Summit Point | August 9 | FRP race weekend | 2026 Atlantic Championship is located in the United States |
| 6 | H1 | Carolina Motorsports Park, Kershaw | August 29 | FRP race weekend | 2026 Atlantic Championship is located in the United States |
| 6 | H2 | Carolina Motorsports Park, Kershaw | August 30 | FRP race weekend | 2026 Atlantic Championship is located in the United States |
| 6 | FR | Carolina Motorsports Park, Kershaw | August 30 | FRP race weekend | 2026 Atlantic Championship is located in the United States |
| 7 | H1 | Barber Motorsports Park, Birmingham | October 18 | SVRA Sprint Series; Formula Regional Americas Championship | 2026 Atlantic Championship is located in the United States |
| 7 | FR | Barber Motorsports Park, Birmingham | October 18 | SVRA Sprint Series; Formula Regional Americas Championship | 2026 Atlantic Championship is located in the United States |

== Race results ==
| Round | | Circuit | 016 Class | | | | Open Class | | | |
| Round | | Circuit | Pole position | Fastest lap | Winning driver | Winning team | Pole position | Fastest lap | Winning driver | Winning team |
|---|---|---|---|---|---|---|---|---|---|---|
| 1 | H1 | Road Atlanta | Harbir Dass | Harbir Dass | John McAleer | MotoNomaddicts | James French | James French | James French | Forty 48 Competition |
| 1 | H2 | Road Atlanta | | Harbir Dass | Harbir Dass | K-Hill Motorsports | | James French | James French | Forty 48 Competition |
| 1 | FR | Road Atlanta | | Harbir Dass | Harbir Dass | K-Hill Motorsports | | James French | James French | Forty 48 Competition |
| 2 | H1 | Mid-Ohio Sports Car Course | Harbir Dass | Harbir Dass | Harbir Dass | K-Hill Motorsports | Nicho Vardis | Nicho Vardis | Nicho Vardis | Vardis Motorsports |
| 2 | H2 | Mid-Ohio Sports Car Course | | Harbir Dass | Harbir Dass | K-Hill Motorsports | | Nicho Vardis | Nicho Vardis | Vardis Motorsports |
| 2 | FR | Mid-Ohio Sports Car Course | | John McAleer | John McAleer | MotoNomaddicts | | Nicho Vardis | Nicho Vardis | Vardis Motorsports |
| 3 | H1 | Road America | Harbir Dass | Dudley Fleck | Harbir Dass | K-Hill Motorsports | Nicho Vardis | Nicho Vardis | J.R. Smart | Team Tonis |
| 3 | H2 | Road America | | Dudley Fleck | Dudley Fleck | K-Hill Motorsports | | J.R. Smart | J.R. Smart | Team Tonis |
| 3 | FR | Road America | | Dudley Fleck | Dudley Fleck | K-Hill Motorsports | | no starters | | |
| 4 | H1 | Watkins Glen International | Harbir Dass | Harbir Dass | Harbir Dass | K-Hill Motorsports | Nicho Vardis | Nicho Vardis | Nicho Vardis | Vardis Motorsports |
| 4 | H2 | Watkins Glen International | | declared non-race after delay due to a crash | | | | declared non-race after delay due to a crash | | |
| 4 | FR | Watkins Glen International | | Vaughn Glace | Vaughn Glace | DrivenTires.com | | Nicho Vardis | Nicho Vardis | Vardis Motorsports |
| 5 | H1 | Summit Point Motorsports Park | Harbir Dass | race cancelled due to inclement weather | | | Bruce Hamilton | race cancelled due to inclement weather | | |
| 5 | H2 | Summit Point Motorsports Park | | Harbir Dass | Harbir Dass | K-Hill Motorsports | | Bruce Hamilton | Bruce Hamilton | K-Hill Motorsports |
| 5 | FR | Summit Point Motorsports Park | | Harbir Dass | Harbir Dass | K-Hill Motorsports | | Bruce Hamilton | Bruce Hamilton | K-Hill Motorsports |
| 6 | H1 | Carolina Motorsports Park | Harbir Dass | Harbir Dass | Harbir Dass | K-Hill Motorsports | Dustin Hodges | Dustin Hodges | Drew Holtgraewe | Arrive Drive Motorsports |
| 6 | H2 | Carolina Motorsports Park | | Harbir Dass | Harbir Dass | K-Hill Motorsports | | Dustin Hodges | Dustin Hodges | Arrive Drive Motorsports |
| 6 | FR | Carolina Motorsports Park | | Harbir Dass | Harbir Dass | K-Hill Motorsports | | Dustin Hodges | Dustin Hodges | Arrive Drive Motorsports |
| 7 | H1 | Barber Motorsports Park | Jean-Luc Liverato | Clay DellaCava | Clay DellaCava | privateer | Nicho Vardis | James Johnston Sr. | Brett Johnston | Johnston and Associates |
| 7 | FR | Barber Motorsports Park | | Jean-Luc Liverato | Jean-Luc Liverato | K-Hill Motorsports | | Nicho Vardis | Nicho Vardis | Vardis Motorsports |

== Season report ==
The opening round of the 2026 Atlantic Championship was held at Road Atlanta. K-Hill Motorsports driver Harbir Dass claimed pole position in the 016 Class, but mechanical issues meant he was unable to finish the first heat race, with MotoNomaddicts driver John McAleer, the only other entrant in class, taking the win. Dass bounced back in heat race two, before then also winning the feature race to close up in the standings. The Open Class saw James French sweep the weekend in his Forty 48 Competition entry. He took pole position in qualifying before beating Arrive Drive Motorsports’ Ayrton Houk and K-Hill Motorsports’ Bruce Hamilton to victory in heat race one. He doubled up in race two, with Hamilton second this time, before going three for three in the feature race to end the weekend with a 23-point advantage over Hamilton, who came second once again.

Round two of the season at Mid-Ohio Sports Car Course saw two more entries join the 016 class in Ryan Saari, competing for DrivenTires.com, and K-Hill Motorsports driver Dudley Fleck. Dass took his second pole position of the year before dominating the first heat race ahead of Fleck and Saari. He repeated the feat in the second heat race, with Fleck second again and McAleer this time taking third. He looked set to remain unbeaten in the feature race, but retired with a car issue after leading the first ten laps. McAleer took over at the front to take victory and remain 39 points ahead of Dass in the standings as Saari took second as the only other finisher in class. The Open Class meanwhile saw just a single entrant for round two: Vardis Motorsports' Nicho Vardis therefore swept the weekend, taking maximum points to draw equal with pre-event class leader French.

Road America hosted round three, and Dass took 016 class pole position once again ahead of his competitors Fleck and McAleer. He converted his advantage into victory in the first heat race as McAleer had to retire with a technical issue. Dass's luck turned in the second heat race, as this time he hit technical trouble and finished third, with the win going to Fleck. The latter then doubled up in the feature race and took another victory as McAleer grew his points lead with another second place. Competition in the Open class began with pole position for Vardis, before he was bested by French, Team Tonis driver J.R. Smart and Forty 48's Jeffrey Antonelli in the race. French was then disqualified, handing victory to Smart, who then also won the second heat race as the sole finisher. None of the four Open class entrants started the feature race, so Vardis took over the class lead.

Round four at Watkins Glen International saw disruptions and delays caused by weather throughout, leading to the series' races being combined with the F2000 Championship Series races. Dass was among only a few drivers completing laps in the wet qualifying session to start the first race from pole position, and he converted that into a lights-to-flag victory. DrivenTires' series debutant Vaughn Glace was the only other 016 competitor to start the first race. A heavy crash for two F2000 competitors and the subsequent delays saw the second race declared a non-event, before Glace doubled up on his race 1 podium and took victory in the feature race. Dass retired after just two laps, but still took the championship lead over the absent McAleer. Vardis was the only Open Class driver starting any of the two races, so he took two more victories to extend his points lead to 107.

The next weekend, held at Summit Point Motorsports Park, saw similar disruptions caused by wet weather: After Dass and Hamilton took pole positions in qualifying for the 016 class and the open class, respectively, a lightning storm hit the area, causing the first race of the weekend to be cancelled. The second heat race, held in dry conditions on Sunday, saw Dass take victory in dominant fashion as he lapped the whole field and set a new track record. Saari came second as Hamilton led Home Tech Consultants' Robert Albani and Arrive Drive Motorsports’ Pierce Krone in the Open Class. With Saari not starting the feature race, Dass was without competition in the 016 Class, so he grew his points lead to 94 points. Hamilton swept the weekend in the Open Class to move within 49 points of Vardis, with Krone and TF Companies' Whitney Strickland completing the class podium.

The Atlantic Championship debuted at Carolina Motorsports Park for the penultimate weekend of its season, but only three drivers entered the two classes. Dass was the only entrant in the 016 class, and therefore took pole position and won all three races. With both McAleer and Fleck absent since round three, Dass was able to take the class championship title with one race weekend to spare. Holtgraewe was joined by Arrive Drive Motorsports' Dustin Hodges in the Open Class, and the latter was fastest in qualifying. Holtgraewe had the superior pace in the first heat race, however, and was able to pass Hodges to win. Hodges bounced back with a win in the second heat race, before also claiming victory in the feature race. Two second races still meant Holtgraewe rose to third in the standings, with the title battle still open heading into the final round.

The season final at Barber Motorsports Park saw only one heat race held ahead of the feature race. The round attracted only two entrants in the 016 Class: K-Hill Motorsports driver Jean-Luc Liverato took pole position, but was beaten in the heat race by privateer Clay DellaCava before he bounced back and won the feature race. Seven drivers entered the Open Class, where Vardis took pole position before falling to sixth place in the heat race. That allowed Brett Johnston to win for his Johnston and Associates team ahead of Road Race Industries' Jim Johnston Jr. and Hodges, before Vardis closed his title-winning season with victory in the feature race, leading Hodges and James Johnston Sr.

== Standings ==
=== Scoring system ===
The weekend format and with it the points system were overhauled for the 2026 season. Each weekend now comprised three races, the first two of which were designated as Heat Races and awarded points per class according to the following scale.

| Position | 1st | 2nd | 3rd | 4th | 5th | 6th | 7th | 8th | 9th | 10th | 11th | 12th | 13th | 14th | 15th | 16th | 17th | 18th+ |
| Points | 25 | 23 | 21 | 19 | 17 | 15 | 13 | 11 | 10 | 9 | 8 | 7 | 6 | 5 | 4 | 3 | 2 | 1 |

The third race of the weekend, called the Feature Race, awarded more points:

| Position | 1st | 2nd | 3rd | 4th | 5th | 6th | 7th | 8th | 9th | 10th | 11th | 12th | 13th | 14th | 15th | 16th | 17th | 18th | 19th | 20th | 21st | 22nd | 23rd | 24th | 25th+ |
| Points | 50 | 42 | 37 | 34 | 31 | 29 | 27 | 25 | 23 | 21 | 19 | 17 | 15 | 13 | 11 | 10 | 9 | 8 | 7 | 6 | 5 | 4 | 3 | 2 | 1 |

Three points were awarded for pole position in each class, as well as two more points for the fastest lap per race per class.

=== Drivers' standings ===
| Pos | Driver | ATL | | | MOH | | | ROA | | | WGL | | | SUM | | | CAR | | | BAR | | Pts |
| Pos | Driver | R1 | R2 | R3 | R1 | R2 | R3 | R1 | R2 | R3 | R1 | R2 | R3 | R1 | R2 | R3 | R1 | R2 | R3 | R1 | R2 | Pts |
016 Class standings
| 1 | Harbir Dass | **Ret** | 1 | 1 | **1** | 1 | (Ret) | **1** | 3 | 3 | **1** | C | Ret | **C** | 1 | 1 | **1** | 1 | 1 | | | 451 |
| 2 | John McAleer | 1 | 2 | 2 | 4 | 3 | 1 | Ret | 2 | 2 | | | | | | | | | | | | 248 |
| 3 | Dudley Fleck | | | | 2 | 2 | DNS | 2† | 1 | 1 | | | | | | | | | | | | 150 |
| 4 | Ryan Saari | | | | 3 | 4 | 2 | | | | WD | WD | WD | C | 2 | DNS | | | | | | 105 |
| 5 | Jean-Luc Liverato | | | | | | | | | | | | | | | | | | | **2** | 1 | 78 |
| 6 | Vaughn Glace | | | | | | | | | | 2 | C | 1 | | | | | | | | | 75 |
| 7 | Clay DellaCava | | | | | | | | | | | | | | | | | | | 1 | 2 | 69 |
| — | Richard Zober | | | | | | | | | | DNS | C | DNS | | | | | | | | | 0 |
Open Class standings
| 1 | Nicho Vardis | | | | **1** | 1 | 1 | **3** | DNS | DNS | **1** | C | 1 | | | | | | | **6** | 1 | 287 |
| 2 | Drew Holtgraewe | | | | | | | | | | | | | C | 6 | 4 | 1 | 2 | 2 | 5 | 5 | 187 |
| 3 | Dustin Hodges | | | | | | | | | | | | | | | | **2** | 1 | 1 | 3 | 2 | 170 |
| 4 | Bruce Hamilton | 3 | 2 | 2 | | | | | | | | | | **C** | 1 | 1 | | | | | | 168 |
| 5 | James French | **1** | 1 | 1 | | | | DSQ | Ret | DNS | | | | | | | | | | | | 110 |
| 6 | Pierce Krone | | | | | | | | | | | | | C | 3 | 2 | | | | | | 63 |
| 7 | Brett Johnston | | | | | | | | | | | | | | | | | | | 1 | 4 | 59 |
| 8 | Whitney Strickland | | | | | | | | | | | | | C | 5 | 3 | | | | | | 54 |
| 9 | J.R. Smart | | | | | | | 1 | 1 | DNS | | | | | | | | | | | | 52 |
| 10 | James Johnston Sr. | | | | | | | | | | | | | | | | | | | 7 | 3 | 52 |
| 11 | Jim Johnston Jr. | | | | | | | | | | | | | | | | | | | 2 | 7 | 50 |
| 12 | Austin Holtgraewe | | | | | | | | | | | | | C | 4 | 5 | | | | | | 50 |
| 13 | Jim Kelleher | | | | | | | | | | | | | | | | | | | 4 | 6 | 48 |
| 14 | Ayrton Houk | 2 | 3 | DNS | | | | | | | | | | | | | | | | | | 44 |
| 15 | Jeffrey Antonelli | | | | | | | 2 | Ret | DNS | | | | | | | | | | | | 24 |
| 16 | Robert Albani | DNS | WD | WD | | | | | | | | | | C | 2 | Ret | | | | | | 24 |
| — | Jean-Luc Liverato | DNS | DNS | DNS | | | | | | | | | | | | | | | | | | 0 |
| — | Rocco Magni | DNS | WD | WD | | | | | | | | | | | | | | | | | | 0 |
| — | Tim Pierce | DNS | WD | WD | | | | | | | | | | | | | | | | | | 0 |
| — | Kirk Kindsfater | | | | | | | | | | DNS | C | DNS | | | | | | | | | 0 |
| Pos | Driver | R1 | R2 | R3 | R1 | R2 | R3 | R1 | R2 | R3 | R1 | R2 | R3 | R1 | R2 | R3 | R1 | R2 | R3 | R1 | R2 | Pts |
| Pos | Driver | ATL | | | MOH | | | ROA | | | WGL | | | SUM | | | CAR | | | BAR | | Pts |

| Colour | Result |
|---|---|
| Gold | Winner |
| Silver | Second place |
| Bronze | Third place |
| Green | Points classification |
| Blue | Non-points classification |
| Blue | Non-classified finish (NC) |
| Purple | Retired, not classified (Ret) |
| Red | Did not qualify (DNQ) |
| Red | Did not pre-qualify (DNPQ) |
| Black | Disqualified (DSQ) |
| White | Did not start (DNS) |
| White | Withdrew (WD) |
| White | Race cancelled (C) |
| Blank | Did not practice (DNP) |
| Blank | Did not arrive (DNA) |
| Blank | Excluded (EX) |

**Bold** – Pole

Italics – Fastest Lap

* – Penalty

== See also ==
- 2026 F2000 Championship Series
- 2026 F1600 Championship Series
