= Nick Gilkes =

British-Canadian racing driver (born 2005)

Nicholas Gilkes
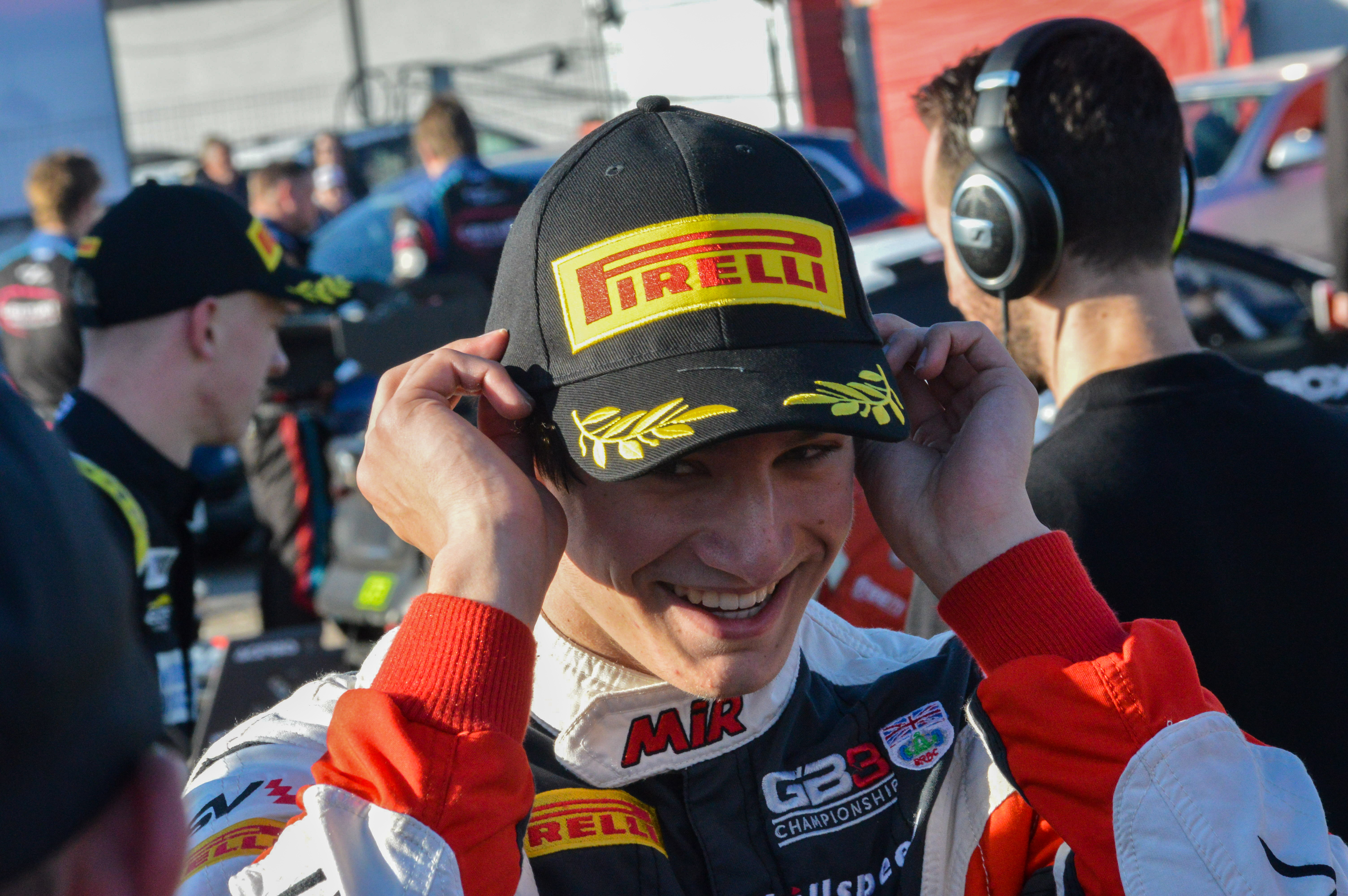
- Gilkes pictured after his first GB3 win at Donington Park in 2022
- Nationality: (Canada) Canadian (United Kingdom) British via dual nationality
- Born: 16 May 2005 (age 21) Richmond Hill, Canada
- Relatives: Megan Gilkes (sister)

Eurocup-3 career
- Debut season: 2023
- Current team: Drivex
- Car number: 64
- Starts: 22 (22 entries)
- Wins: 0
- Podiums: 0
- Poles: 0
- Fastest laps: 0
- Best finish: 11th in 2023

Previous series
- 2022 2021 2021: GB3 Championship; Ontario F1600 Championship; Canadian F1600 Championship

Championship titles
- 2021 2021: Ontario F1600 Championship; Canadian F1600 Championship

Nicholas Gilkes (born 16 May 2005) is a British-Canadian racing driver currently competing in Eurocup-3 with Drivex. He is the 2021 Ontario F1600 and Canadian F1600 champion respectively and a race winner in the GB3 Championship.

== Career ==
=== Karting ===
Having started racing in Barbados, Gilkes moved into serious competition once he and his family moved back to Canada. There, he took the Goodwood Kartways Novice Club title in 2016 and became Pfaff Kartsport Cup winner two years later. Gilkes' tenure in the United States' karting scene turned out to bear fruit, with second place at the US Grand Nationals. In 2020, his final year of karting, Gilkes also won the Canadian KartStars Championship.

=== Formula Ford ===
Gilkes made his single-seater debut in 2021, competing in the Ontario-based Toyo Tires F1600 Championship Series and Canadian F1600 Championships for Britain West Motorsport. He experienced two dominant campaigns and took both titles, therefore becoming the youngest ever Ontario F1600 champion.

Before the end of the year, Gilkes made his first racing appearance in Britain. Driving for Kevin Mills Racing, he would compete in the Walter Hayes Trophy, where he finished 20th, and the Formula Ford Festival, where he collided with his sister in the semi-final heat.

=== GB3 Championship ===
Following a test at Silverstone, Gilkes was announced to be signing for Hillspeed to compete in the GB3 Championship in 2022. Having qualified seventeenth in both qualifying sessions at the first round at Oulton Park, Gilkes finished sixteenth and eighteenth in races 1 and 2. Due to the reverse grid format the Canadian was able to start from third place in the final race of the weekend. He would end up missing out on the podium after being overtaken by David Morales in the closing stages of the race. At the following round at the Silverstone Circuit, the Canadian would score his first podium in the series, profiting from a quick getaway at the start to overtake two competitors and closely battling Cian Shields for the victory in the final laps. Round three at Donington Park would start out in disappointing fashion however, as a suspension issue in qualifying meant that Gilkes was forced to start from last place in all three races. A collision with David Morales in Race 1 compounded matters, as it led to the Canadian's first retirement of the season. He would come back fighting in the third race, overtaking ten cars to finish twelfth. A then-best qualifying performance of thirteenth at Snetterton Circuit, which he described as "a fairly decent result", would be cancelled out by a car failure which prevented Gilkes from starting Race 1.

After the summer break, Gilkes would qualify twelfth at Spa-Francorchamps and, for the first time that season, finished twelfth or better in each race despite a lack of experience at the circuit compared to his rivals, with a fifth place in the reversed-grid race capping off his weekend. During the following event at Silverstone, the Canadian became embroiled in a fight for the podium, however he would spin out on a damp part of the track after an overtake attempt on Zak Taylor. An anonymous weekend followed, as Gilkes finished outside of the top-fifteen in the main races. Gilkes concluded his season in perfect fashion however, winning the final race of the campaign at Donington Park, having managed to lead from start to finish. He ended up fourteenth in the standings with 165.5 points.

=== Eurocup-3 ===
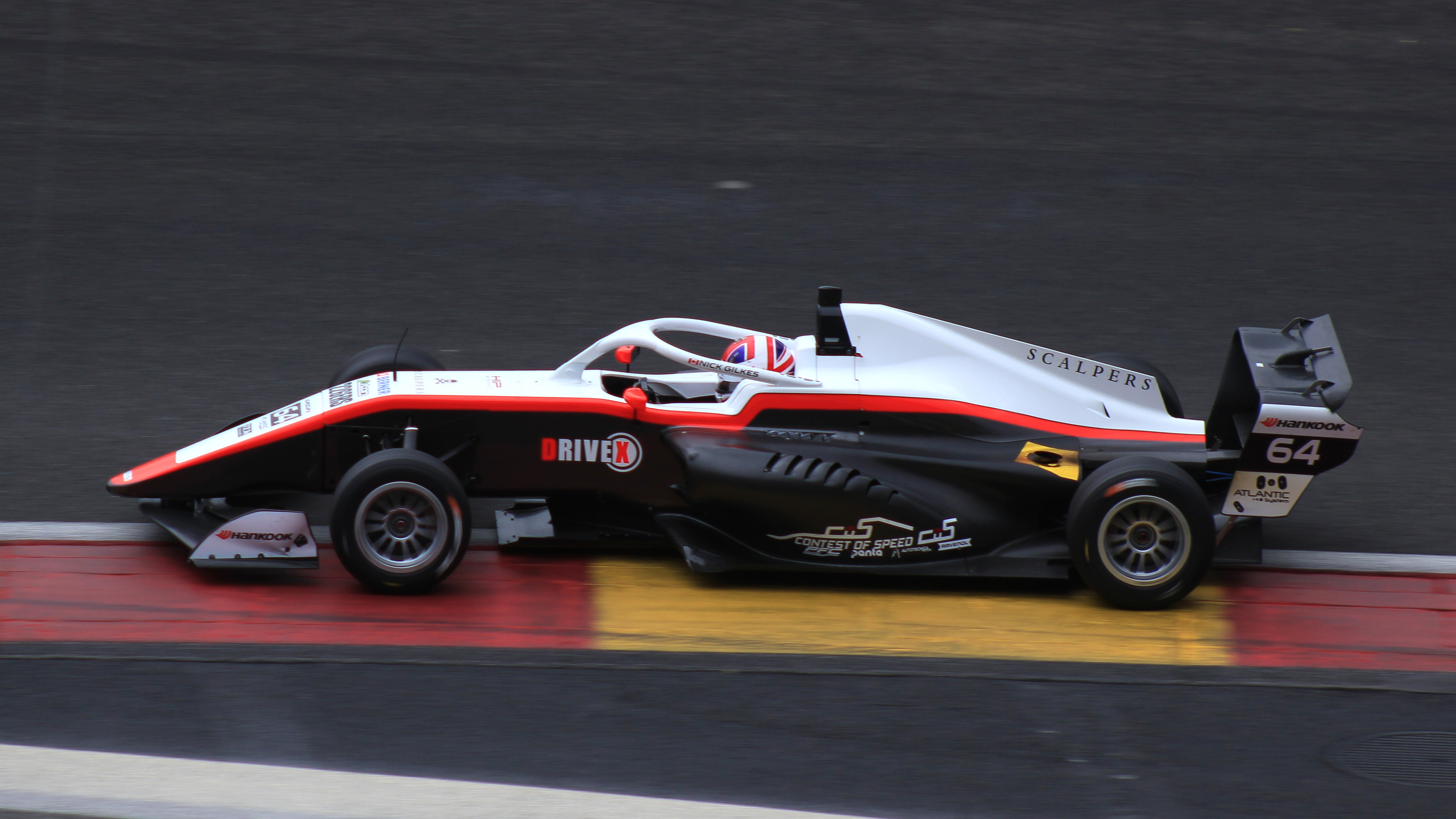
Gilkes during the 2023 Eurocup-3 race at the Circuit de Spa-Francorchamps

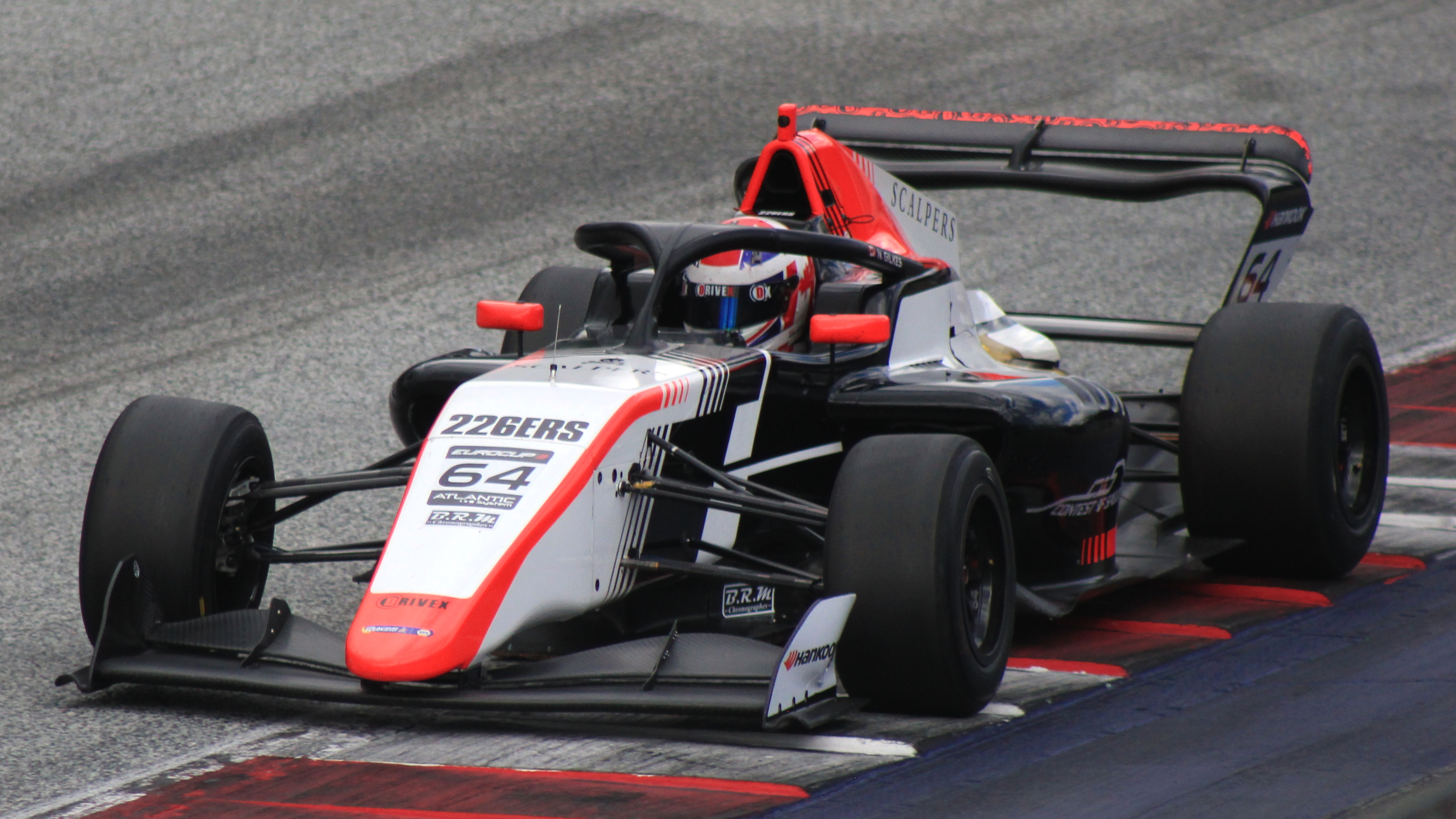
Gilkes at the Red Bull Ring in 2024

Gilkes would team up with Drivex for the 2023 season, driving in the newly formed Eurocup-3 series alongside Formula Nordic champion William Karlsson. He finished eleventh in the standings, scoring a best race result of fifth at Estoril.

== Personal life ==
Gilkes is the younger brother of Megan Gilkes, who was previously competing in F1 Academy.

== Racing record ==
=== Racing career summary ===
Season	Series	Team	Races	Wins	Poles	F/Laps	Podiums	Points	Position
2021	Toyo Tires F1600 Championship Series	Britain West Motorsport	18	7	8	7	17	435	**1st**
2021	Canadian F1600 Championship	Britain West Motorsport	9	8	3	7	9	?	**1st**
2021	Formula Ford Festival	Kevin Mills Racing	2	0	0	0	0	N/A	NC
2021	Formula Ford 1600 - Walter Hayes Trophy	Kevin Mills Racing	1	0	0	0	0	N/A	20th
2022	GB3 Championship	Hillspeed	23	1	0	0	2	165.5	14th
2023	Eurocup-3	Drivex	16	0	0	0	0	37	11th
2024	Eurocup-3	Drivex	12	0	0	0	0	1	23rd
2025	USF Pro 2000 Championship	Jay Howard Driver Development	4	0	0	0	0	22	24th
2025	F2000 Championship Series	ADSA/WRIGHT Racing	2	2	1	1	2	107	8th
2026	F2000 Championship Series	Arrive Drive Motorsport	3	2	0	3	3	107	5th

* Season still in progress.

=== Complete Toyo Tires F1600 Championship Series results ===
(key) (Races in bold indicate pole position) (Races in italics indicate fastest lap)

Year	Team	1	2	3	4	5	6	7	8	9	10	11	12	13	14	15	16	17	18	DC	Points
2021	Britain West Motorsport	**CMP1**; **1**; 2	CMP1; 2; 3	CMP1; 3; 2	**CMP2**; **1**; 1	**CMP2**; **2**; 2	CMP2; 3; 7	**CAL**; **1**; 2	CAL; 2; 2	CAL; 3; 2	**CMP3**; **1**; 1	CMP3; 2; 3	CMP3; 3; 2	**CMP4**; **1**; 1	CMP4; 2; 1	**CMP4**; **3**; 3	CMP5; 1; 1	CMP5; 2; 1	**CMP5**; **3**; 1	1st	435

=== Complete GB3 Championship results ===
(key) (Races in bold indicate pole position) (Races in italics indicate fastest lap)

Year	Team	1	2	3	4	5	6	7	8	9	10	11	12	13	14	15	16	17	18	19	20	21	22	23	24	DC	Points
2022	Hillspeed	OUL; 1; 16	OUL; 2; 18	OUL; 3; 4	SIL1; 1; 17	SIL1; 2; 17	SIL1; 3; 2^{2}	DON1; 1 Ret	DON1; 2; 18	DON1; 3; 12^{10}	SNE; 1 DNS	SNE; 2; 12	SNE; 3; 19	SPA; 1; 12	SPA; 2; 11	SPA; 3; 5^{2}	SIL2; 1; 14	SIL2; 2; 12	SIL2; 3; 16	BRH; 1; 19	BRH; 2; 17	BRH; 3; 6	DON2; 1; 13	DON2; 2; 15	DON2; 3; 1	14th	165.5

=== Complete Eurocup-3 results ===
(key) (Races in bold indicate pole position) (Races in italics indicate fastest lap)

Year	Team	1	2	3	4	5	6	7	8	9	10	11	12	13	14	15	16	17	DC	Points
2023	Drivex	SPA; 1; 7	SPA; 2; 9	ARA; 1 Ret	ARA; 2; 6	MNZ; 1; 10	MNZ; 2; 14	ZAN; 1 Ret	ZAN; 2; 13	JER; 1; 11	JER; 2; 9	EST; 1; 5	EST; 2; 8	CRT; 1 Ret	CRT; 2; 11	CAT; 1; 11	CAT; 2; 8		11th	37
2024	Drivex	SPA; 1; 10	SPA; 2 C	RBR; 1; 16	RBR; 2; 20	POR; 1; 12	POR; 2; 16	POR; 3; 13	LEC; 1 Ret	LEC; 2; 15	ZAN; 1; 16	ZAN; 2; 19	ARA; 1; 16	ARA; 2; 19	JER; 1	JER; 2	CAT; 1	CAT; 2	23rd	1

=== American open-wheel racing results ===
==== USF Pro 2000 Championship ====
(key) (Races in bold indicate pole position) (Races in italics indicate fastest lap)

Year	Team	1	2	3	4	5	6	7	8	9	10	11	12	13	14	15	16	17	18	Position	Points
2025	Jay Howard Driver Development	STP; 1	STP; 2	LOU; 1	LOU; 2	LOU; 3	IMS; 1	IMS; 2	IMS; 3	IRP	ROA; 1	ROA; 2	ROA; 3	MOH; 1; 17	MOH; 2; 17	TOR; 1; 13	TOR; 2; 15	POR; 1	POR; 2	24th	14

Sporting positions
Preceded by Mac Clark	Toyo Tires F1600 Championship Series; Champion; 2021	Succeeded by Jake Cowden
Preceded by TBC	Canadian F1600 Championship; Champion; 2021	Succeeded by TBC
