= 2024 NACAM Formula 4 Championship =

Auto racing series

The 2024 NACAM Formula 4 Championship season was the eighth season of the NACAM Formula 4 Championship. It began on 25 October at Autódromo Hermanos Rodríguez in Mexico City and ended on 17 December at the same circuit.

The championship switched from the first generation Formula 4 Mygale M14-F4 chassis and Ford EcoBoost engines to the second generation Tatuus F4-T421 chassis and the Fiat-Abarth engines.

== Teams and drivers ==
Team	No.	Driver	Rounds
(Mexico) Santinel Racing Team	7	(Romania) Horia-Traian Chirigut	1–2
(Mexico) Ram Racing	13	(Mexico) Max Mora	All
(Mexico) Ram Racing	33	(Mexico) Alan Zezatti	All
(Mexico) Ram Racing	34	(Mexico) Zaky Ibrahim	All
(Mexico) Alessandros Racing	17	(Mexico) José Martínez	All
(Mexico) Alessandros Racing	27	(Mexico) Helio Meza	All
(Mexico) Alessandros Racing	29	(Mexico) José Carlos Hernández	All
(Mexico) Alessandros Racing	32	(Spain) Nerea Martí	3
(Mexico) Alessandros Racing	08	(Mexico) Alejandro Bobadilla	All
(Mexico) RRK Motorsports	23	(United States) Alex Franco	1–2
(Mexico) RRK Motorsports	88	(Mexico) Cristian Cantú	1

== Race calendar ==
Initially, all rounds would be held in Mexico except one round in Panama. Except the support round of the 2024 Mexico City Grand Prix, both other rounds would be a part of the Copa Notiauto series roster. In June 2024, another tentative schedule was published with the beginning of the season postponed and the final rounds pushed into 2025. By January 2025, the series concluded and the remaining rounds were moved to the 2025 season.

Round		Circuit	Date	Pole position	Fastest lap	Winning driver	Winning team
1	R1	Autódromo Hermanos Rodríguez (Grand Prix Circuit, Mexico City)	26 October	(Mexico) José Carlos Hernández	(Mexico) José Carlos Hernández	(Mexico) José Carlos Hernández	(Mexico) Alessandros Racing
1	R2	Autódromo Hermanos Rodríguez (Grand Prix Circuit, Mexico City)	27 October	(Mexico) José Carlos Hernández	(Mexico) Helio Meza	(Mexico) José Carlos Hernández	(Mexico) Alessandros Racing
2	R1	Autódromo Miguel E. Abed (Short Int. Circuit, Amozoc, Puebla)	23 November	(Mexico) Helio Meza	(Mexico) Helio Meza	(Mexico) Helio Meza	(Mexico) Alessandros Racing
2	R2	Autódromo Miguel E. Abed (Short Int. Circuit, Amozoc, Puebla)	24 November		(Mexico) Helio Meza	(Mexico) José Carlos Hernández	(Mexico) Alessandros Racing
2	R3	Autódromo Miguel E. Abed (Short Int. Circuit, Amozoc, Puebla)	24 November	(Mexico) Helio Meza	(Mexico) José Carlos Hernández	(Mexico) Helio Meza	(Mexico) Alessandros Racing
3	R1	Autódromo Hermanos Rodríguez (Grand Prix without Foro, Mexico City)	16 December	(Mexico) José Carlos Hernández	(Mexico) José Carlos Hernández	(Mexico) José Carlos Hernández	(Mexico) Alessandros Racing
3	R2	Autódromo Hermanos Rodríguez (Grand Prix without Foro, Mexico City)	17 December		(Spain) Nerea Martí	(Spain) Nerea Martí	(Mexico) Alessandros Racing
3	R3	Autódromo Hermanos Rodríguez (Grand Prix without Foro, Mexico City)	17 December	(Mexico) José Carlos Hernández	(Spain) Nerea Martí	(Mexico) José Carlos Hernández	(Mexico) Alessandros Racing

== Championship standings ==
Points were awarded to the top 10 classified finishers in each race.

Position	**1st**	**2nd**	**3rd**	**4th**	**5th**	**6th**	**7th**	**8th**	**9th**	**10th**
Points	25	18	15	12	10	8	6	4	2	1

=== Drivers' Championship ===
Pos	Driver	AHR1		PUE			AHR2			Pts
Pos	Driver	R1	R2	R1	R2	R3	R1	R2	R3	Pts
1	(Mexico) José Carlos Hernández	**1**	**1**	2	1	2	**1**	2	**1**	179
2	(Mexico) Helio Meza	3	2	**1**	2	**1**	3	3	4	143
3	(Mexico) Zaky Ibrahim	2	3	5	5	5	4	5	8	89
4	(Mexico) Alejandro Bobadilla	5	DNS	3	3	3	5	6	3	88
5	(Mexico) José Martínez	6	4	4	8	4	6	4	5	78
6	(Spain) Nerea Martí						2	1	2	61
7	(Mexico) Max Mora	8	5	7	4	9	7	7	6	54
8	(Mexico) Alan Zezatti	10	7	9	6	6	8	8	7	39
9	(United States) Alex Franco	9	6	8	7	8				24
10	(Romania) Horia-Traian Chirigut	7	DNS	6	9	7				22
11	(Mexico) Cristian Cantú	4	DNS							12
Pos	Driver	R1	R2	R1	R2	R3	R1	R2	R3	Pts
Pos	Driver	AHR1		PUE			AHR2			Pts

Colour	Result
Gold	Winner
Silver	Second place
Bronze	Third place
Green	Points classification
Blue	Non-points classification
Blue	Non-classified finish (NC)
Purple	Retired, not classified (Ret)
Red	Did not qualify (DNQ)
Red	Did not pre-qualify (DNPQ)
Black	Disqualified (DSQ)
White	Did not start (DNS)
White	Withdrew (WD)
White	Race cancelled (C)
Blank	Did not practice (DNP)
Blank	Did not arrive (DNA)
Blank	Excluded (EX)

**Bold** – Pole
Italics – Fastest Lap

=== Nations Cup ===
Only the highest classified driver scored points for their nation.

Pos	Nation	AHR1		PUE1			AHR2			Pts
Pos	Nation	R1	R2	R1	R2	R3	R1	R2	R3	Pts
1	Mexico	1	1	1	1	1	1	2	1	193
2	Spain						2	1	2	61
3	United States	9	6	8	7	8				24
4	Romania	7	DNS	6	9	7				22
Pos	Nation	R1	R2	R1	R2	R3	R1	R2	R3	Pts
Pos	Nation	AHR1		PUE			AHR2			Pts
