= 2026 Trans-Am Series =

58th season of the Trans-Am Series

The 2026 Trans-Am Series season (known for sponsorship reasons as the 2026 Trans-Am Series presented by Pirelli) was the 58th running of the Trans-Am Series and sanctioned by SCCA Pro Racing. The National Championship began at Sebring International Raceway on February 26, and finished at Circuit of The Americas on November 8. The Western Championship began at Sonoma Raceway on April 23 and finished at Circuit of The Americas. Both championships ran two rounds jointly at Sonoma and COTA. From this year onwards, the events would no longer be held under the SpeedTour name, as Parella Motorsports & SpeedTour have been rebranded under Racing America.

A new championship was created for this season, named TA Sprint, consisting of races that are 50 miles or 35 minutes. Eligible cars are TA2-based cars that currently compete in the Trans-Am Series, as well as older TA2 cars running in the SCCA Club Racing GT2 class, and other club racing platforms.

== National Championship ==
=== Calendar ===
Round	Race	Circuit	Date
1	1	Sebring International Raceway, Sebring, Florida	February 26 – March 1
2	2	(Georgia (U.S. state)) Road Atlanta, Braselton, Georgia	March 12–15
3	3	Sonoma Raceway, Sonoma, California	April 23–26
3	4	Sonoma Raceway, Sonoma, California	April 23–26
4	5	Lime Rock Park, Lakeville, Connecticut	May 21–23
5	6	Indianapolis Motor Speedway, Speedway, Indiana	June 18–21
6	7	Road America, Elkhart Lake, Wisconsin	June 25–28
7	8	(New York (state)) Watkins Glen International, Watkins Glen, New York	July 16–19
7	9	(New York (state)) Watkins Glen International, Watkins Glen, New York	July 16–19
8	10	Canadian Tire Motorsport Park, Bowmanville, Canada	September 3–6
9	11	Virginia International Raceway, Alton, Virginia	September 17–20
10	12	Circuit of the Americas, Austin, Texas	November 5–8

=== Entry list ===
==== TA/GT/SGT/XGT/GT1/TAC ====
Car	No.	Driver	Rounds
TA
Dodge Challenger	2	(United States) Kaylee Bryson	1–2
Dodge Challenger	2	(United States) Boris Said	5
Ford Mustang	3	(United States) Paul Menard	1–7
Ford Mustang	4	(United States) Jon DeGaynor	1, 5–7
Ford Mustang	16	(United States) Matthew Brabham	1–8
Ford Mustang	20	(Brazil) Rafa Matos	3
Ford Mustang	20	(United States) Chris Dyson	4–5, 7–8
Ford Mustang	31	(United States) Paul Menard	8
Ford Mustang	57	(United States) David Pintaric	1–8
Chevrolet Camaro	02	(United States) Kaylee Bryson	5
Chevrolet Camaro	7	(Austria) Martin Ragginger	1–2, 5
Chevrolet Camaro	8	(United States) Tomy Drissi	1–8
Chevrolet Camaro	9	(United States) Cole Moore	8
Chevrolet Camaro	17	(United States) Adam Andretti	1–2
Chevrolet Camaro	59	(United States) Simon Gregg	1–3
Chevrolet Corvette	23	(United States) Amy Ruman	5–7
SGT
Chevrolet Camaro	49	(United States) Patrick Utt	1–5
Chevrolet Corvette	88	(United States) Austen Dinger	6
Dodge Viper	84	(United States) Lee Saunders	1
Ferrari 458 Challenge	97	(United States) Chris Coffey	1–4, 7
Ford Mustang	30	(United States) Dana Blackhurst	2, 5
Ford Mustang	49	(United States) Patrick Utt	6, 8
Ford Mustang	60	(United States) Tim Gray	2, 5–6
Ford Mustang	68	(United States) Ray Mason	1
Ford Mustang GT500	24	(United States) Derric Carter	6
Maserati MC GT4	27	(United States) Chris Coffey	5
Porsche 992	15	(United States) Milton Grant	1–2, 5, 7
Porsche 991.2 GT3 Cup	72	(United States) Zach Arnold	2, 5, 7–8
Porsche 991.1 GT3 Cup	91	(United States) Jesse Schmidt	4, 7
XGT
Porsche 911 GT3 R	10	(United States) Erich Joiner	4
Mercedes-AMG GT3	14	(United States) Billy Griffin	1–2, 4
GT
Howe HR6	6	(United States) Adrian Wlostowski	5
Howe HR6	51	(United States) Matthew Butson	5
Porsche 997.1 GT3 Cup	13	(United States) Michael Saia	4, 7
Ford Mustang GT500	24	(United States) Derric Carter	1–2, 4–5, 7
Factory5 Daytona 65 R	47	(United States) Brion Gluck	4–5
GT1
Chevrolet Camaro	11	(United States) Jordan Bupp	1–2, 7
Chevrolet Camaro	64	(United States) Rob Dickey	6
Chevrolet Camaro	98	(United States) Brent Goforth	2, 4–5
Chevrolet Camaro	99	(United States) Bill Goforth	4
Chevrolet Corvette	00	(United States) Lawrence Loshak	6
Chevrolet Corvette	99	(United States) Bill Goforth	5
Ford Mustang	6	(United States) Colin Comer	6
Ford Mustang	22	(Puerto Rico) Axel Rivera	1
Ford Mustang	70	(United States) David Jans	1
Ford Mustang	77	(United States) Paul Fix	1
TAC
Chevrolet Camaro	9	(United States) Ken Thwaits	1–3, 5–6
Chevrolet Camaro	65	(United States) Steve Goldman	3
Dodge Challenger	85	(United States) Ken Sutherland	5–6
Dodge Challenger	86	(Canada) David Kunicki	3, 5–6
Ford Mustang	08	(United States) Matt Crandall	1–2
Ford Mustang	27	(United States) John Moore	3
Ford Mustang	32	(United States) Cole Moore	1–2
Ford Mustang	32	(United States) Aaron Young	3
Ford Mustang	62	(United States) Jim Guthrie	1–3, 5–6
Ford Mustang	67	(United States) Phil Fogg Jr	2–3, 5
Ford Mustang	89	(United States) Cole Moore	5
Ford Mustang	92	(United States) Chris Evans	3
Ford Mustang	99	(United States) Cole Moore	3, 6

==== CUBE 3 Architecture TA2 Series ====
Car	No.	Driver	Class	Rounds
TA2
Chevrolet Camaro	00	(United States) Jared Odrick	PA	1–8
Chevrolet Camaro	7	(United States) Noah Harmon	P	1–8
Chevrolet Camaro	8	(Mexico) Andrés Pérez de Lara	P	2
Chevrolet Camaro	8	(United States) Ben Maier	P	4
Chevrolet Camaro	8	(United States) JC Meynet	PA	5–6
Chevrolet Camaro	17	(Israel) Alon Day	P	1–2, 4–8
Chevrolet Camaro	18	(United States) Naz Olkhovskyi	PA	5
Chevrolet Camaro	19	(United States) Graham Jacobson	P	1–8
Chevrolet Camaro	24	(United States) Aiden Dorvee	PA	4–5, 7
Chevrolet Camaro	25	(United States) Jace Denmark	P	1–3
Chevrolet Camaro	27	(United States) Lanie Buice	P	1–3, 5–8
Chevrolet Camaro	27	(United States) Connor Mosack	P	4
Chevrolet Camaro	28	(United States) Helio Meza	P	1–8
Chevrolet Camaro	44	(United States) Patrick Paul	PA	1–2, 5
Chevrolet Camaro	46	(United States) Tim Carroll	PA	5–6
Chevrolet Camaro	48	(United States) Connor Mosack	P	1, 3
Chevrolet Camaro	48	(United States) Naz Olkhovskyi	PA	2
Chevrolet Camaro	48	(United States) Matthew Brabham	P	6
Chevrolet Camaro	48	(United States) Tristan McKee	P	7
Chevrolet Camaro	51	(United States) Gavin Gleitsman	P	2–8
Chevrolet Camaro	53	(United States) Bryan Scheible	PA	5, 7
Chevrolet Camaro	57	(United States) Max Reaves	P	3–4
Chevrolet Camaro	62	(United States) Landen Lewis	P	4
Chevrolet Camaro	63	(United States) Gavin Gleitsman	P	1
Chevrolet Camaro	66	(United States) Christina Lam	PA	1–3, 5–8
Chevrolet Camaro	72	(United States) Preston Peables	PA	2, 4–5, 7
Chevrolet Camaro	75	(United States) Tanner Reif	P	1–8
Chevrolet Camaro	89	(United States) James Libecco	PA	7
Chevrolet Camaro	91	(United States) Justin Elder	PA	8
Chevrolet Camaro	117	(Israel) Alon Day	P	3
Dodge Challenger	26	(United States) Thomas Merril	P	1–2, 7
Ford Mustang	2	(United States) Joe Federl	P	3, 5–8
Ford Mustang	3	(United States) Adrian Wlostowski	P	1–8
Ford Mustang	12	(Brazil) Rafa Matos	P	1–2, 4
Ford Mustang	16	(United States) Jim Gallaugher	PA	1–3, 5–7
Ford Mustang	26	(Brazil) Rafa Matos	P	3
Ford Mustang	26	(United States) Thomas Merril	P	4–5
Ford Mustang	29	(United States) Maciej Tuniewicz	PA	1, 4, 7
Ford Mustang	31	(United States) Michael LaPaglia	PA	5–6
Ford Mustang	61	(United States) Roberto Sabato	PA	1–2, 6–8
Ford Mustang	64	(United States) Matt Gray	PA	1–7
Ford Mustang	67	(United States) Matt Griffin	PA	1–2
Ford Mustang	68	(United States) Jace Denmark	P	5–6, 8
Ford Mustang	71	(United States) Eric Cayton	P	1–8
Ford Mustang	88	(United States) Stanton Barrett	P	1–8
Ford Mustang	91	(United States) Ethan Jacobs	P	6
Ford Mustang	97	(United States) Tom Sheehan	PA	1, 4, 7
Ford Mustang	98	(United States) Doug Winston	PA	1–2, 4, 6–8
Toyota Camry	9	(United States) Keith Prociuk	PA	1–2, 4–6
Toyota Camry	9	(Brazil) Rafa Matos	P	7
Toyota Camry	10	(United States) Ethan Tovo	P	1–8
Toyota Camry	15	(Australia) Nathan Herne	P	7
Toyota Camry	20	(United States) Seamus McKendree	P	1–6
Toyota Camry	20	(United States) Jay Thomas	P	7
Toyota Camry	30	(United States) Jackson Tovo	P	1–8
Toyota Camry	70	(United States) Sam Corry	P	1–3
Toyota Camry	70	(United States) Jay Thomas	P	8
Toyota Camry	90	(United States) Vinnie Meskelis	P	1, 7
Toyota Camry	90	(United States) Jake Bollman	P	4
Toyota Camry	90	(United States) Tyler Kicera	P	5–6
Toyota Camry	95	(United States) Gian Buffomante	P	1–2, 4–8
Toyota Camry	99	(United States) Cale Phillips	PA	1–8

Icon	Class
P	Pro
PA	Pro-Am

=== Race results ===
Round	Race	Circuit	TA Winning driver	TA2 Winning driver	TA2 Pro-Am Winning driver	XGT Winning driver	SGT Winning driver	GT Winning driver	TAC Winning driver	GT1 Winning driver
1	1	Sebring International Raceway	(United States) Matthew Brabham	(United States) Helio Meza	(United States) Jared Odrick	(United States) Billy Griffin	(United States) Lee Saunders	(United States) Derric Carter	(United States) Cole Moore	(United States) Jordan Bupp
2	2	Road Atlanta	(United States) Matthew Brabham	(United States) Helio Meza	(United States) Keith Prociuk	(United States) Billy Griffin	(United States) Chris Coffey	(United States) Derric Carter	(United States) Jim Guthrie	(United States) Jordan Bupp
3	3	Sonoma Raceway	(United States) Matthew Brabham	(United States) Helio Meza	(United States) Jared Odrick	No entries	(United States) Chris Coffey	No entries	(United States) Cole Moore	No entries
3	4	Sonoma Raceway	(United States) Matthew Brabham	(United States) Helio Meza	(United States) Jared Odrick	No entries	(United States) Chris Coffey	No entries	(United States) Phil Fogg Jr	No entries
4	5	Lime Rock Park	(United States) Paul Menard	(Israel) Alon Day	(United States) Jared Odrick	(United States) Erich Joiner	(United States) Jesse Schmidt	(United States) Michael Saia	Did not participate	(United States) Brent Goforth
5	6	Indianapolis Motor Speedway	(United States) Matthew Brabham	(United States) Helio Meza	(United States) Keith Prociuk	No entries	(United States) Zach Arnold	(United States) Adrian Wlostowski	(United States) Cole Moore	(United States) Brent Goforth
6	7	Road America	(United States) Matthew Brabham	(Israel) Alon Day	(United States) Jared Odrick	No entries	(United States) Derric Carter	No entries	(United States) Cole Moore	(United States) Colin Comer
7	8	Watkins Glen International	(United States) Matthew Brabham	(United States) Helio Meza	(United States) Cale Phillips	No entries	(United States) Zach Arnold	(United States) Michael Saia	Did not participate	No entries
7	9	Watkins Glen International	(United States) Matthew Brabham	(United States) Tristan McKee	(United States) Cale Phillips	No entries	(United States) Zach Arnold	(United States) Derric Carter	Did not participate	No entries
8	10	Canadian Tire Motorsport Park				No entries	No entries	No entries	Did not participate	No entries
9	11	Virginia International Raceway							Did not participate	
10	12	Circuit of the Americas							Did not participate	

== TA Sprint Championship ==
=== Calendar ===
Round	Race	Circuit	Date
1	1	Sebring International Raceway, Sebring, Florida	February 26 – March 1
2	2	Lime Rock Park, Lakeville, Connecticut	May 21–23
3	3	Road America, Elkhart Lake, Wisconsin	June 25–28
3	4	Road America, Elkhart Lake, Wisconsin	June 25–28
4	5	(New York (state)) Watkins Glen International, Watkins Glen, New York	July 16–19
5	6	Circuit of the Americas, Austin, Texas	November 5–8

=== Entry list ===
Car	No.	Driver	Rounds
TA2
Chevrolet Camaro	8	(United States) Jim Guthrie	3
Chevrolet Camaro	11	(United States) Paul Ruth	1
Chevrolet Camaro	18	(United States) Naz Olkhovskyi	3
Chevrolet Camaro	46	(United States) Tim Carroll	3
Chevrolet Camaro	66	(United States) Christina Lam	3
Chevrolet Camaro	89	(United States) James Libecco	1
Dodge Challenger	09	(United States) Rene Molina	1
Ford Mustang	02	(United States) John Atwell	1, 3
Ford Mustang	16	(United States) Alan Davison	1
Ford Mustang	16	(United States) Jim Gallaugher	3
Ford Mustang	24	(United States) Brad McAllister	3
Ford Mustang	27	(United States) Rob Kacprowicz	1, 3
Ford Mustang	54	(United States) Bruce Raymond	1, 3

=== Race results ===
Round	Race	Circuit	Winning driver	Winning car
1	1	Sebring International Raceway	(United States) John Atwell	Ford Mustang
2	2	Lime Rock Park	No entries	
3	3	Road America	(United States) John Atwell	Ford Mustang
3	4	Road America	(United States) John Atwell	Ford Mustang
4	5	Watkins Glen International	No entries	
5	6	Circuit of the Americas		

== Western Championship ==
=== Calendar ===
Round	Race	Circuit	Date
1	1	Sonoma Raceway, Sonoma, California	April 23–26
1	2	Sonoma Raceway, Sonoma, California	April 23–26
2	3	WeatherTech Raceway Laguna Seca, Monterey, California	October 2–4
2	4	WeatherTech Raceway Laguna Seca, Monterey, California	October 2–4
3	5	Circuit of the Americas, Austin, Texas	November 5–8

=== Entry list ===
Car	No.	Driver	Rounds
TA
Ford Mustang	3	(United States) Paul Menard	1
Ford Mustang	16	(United States) Matthew Brabham	1
Ford Mustang	20	(Brazil) Rafa Matos	1
Ford Mustang	57	(United States) David Pintaric	1
Chevrolet Camaro	8	(United States) Tomy Drissi	1
Chevrolet Camaro	59	(United States) Simon Gregg	1
TA2
Chevrolet Camaro	00	(United States) Jared Odrick	1
Chevrolet Camaro	7	(United States) Noah Harmon	1
Chevrolet Camaro	19	(United States) Graham Jacobson	1
Chevrolet Camaro	25	(United States) Jace Denmark	1
Chevrolet Camaro	27	(United States) Lanie Buice	1
Chevrolet Camaro	28	(United States) Helio Meza	1
Chevrolet Camaro	46	(United States) Tim Carroll	1
Chevrolet Camaro	48	(United States) Connor Mosack	1
Chevrolet Camaro	51	(United States) Gavin Gleitsman	1
Chevrolet Camaro	57	(United States) Max Reaves	1
Chevrolet Camaro	66	(United States) Christina Lam	1
Chevrolet Camaro	75	(United States) Tanner Reif	1
Chevrolet Camaro	117	(Israel) Alon Day	1
Chevrolet Camaro	128	(United States) JC Meynet	1
Ford Mustang	2	(United States) Joe Federl	1
Ford Mustang	3	(United States) Adrian Wlostowski	1
Ford Mustang	16	(United States) Jim Gallaugher	1
Ford Mustang	17	(United States) Tim Lynn	1
Ford Mustang	26	(Brazil) Rafa Matos	1
Ford Mustang	31	(United States) Michael LaPaglia	1
Ford Mustang	39	(United States) Bob Accardo	1
Ford Mustang	64	(United States) Matt Gray	1
Ford Mustang	71	(United States) Eric Cayton	1
Ford Mustang	80	(United States) Kyle Kelley	1
Ford Mustang	88	(United States) Stanton Barrett	1
Ford Mustang	127	(United States) John Moore	1
Ford Mustang	199	(United States) Cole Moore	1
Toyota Camry	10	(United States) Ethan Tovo	1
Toyota Camry	20	(United States) Seamus McKendree	1
Toyota Camry	30	(United States) Jackson Tovo	1
Toyota Camry	70	(United States) Sam Corry	1
Toyota Camry	99	(United States) Cale Phillips	1
SGT
Chevrolet Camaro	49	(United States) Patrick Utt	1
Ferrari 458 Challenge	97	(United States) Chris Coffey	1
XGT
GT
TAC
Chevrolet Camaro	9	(United States) Ken Thwaits	1
Chevrolet Camaro	65	(United States) Steve Goldman	1
Dodge Challenger	86	(Canada) David Kunicki	1
Ford Mustang	27	(United States) John Moore	1
Ford Mustang	32	(United States) Aaron Young	1
Ford Mustang	62	(United States) Jim Guthrie	1
Ford Mustang	67	(United States) Phil Fogg Jr	1
Ford Mustang	92	(United States) Chris Evans	1
Ford Mustang	99	(United States) Cole Moore	1
GT1

=== Race results ===
Round	Race	Circuit	TA Winning driver	TA2 Winning driver	XGT Winning driver	SGT Winning driver	GT Winning driver	TAC Winning driver	GT1 Winning driver
1	1	Sonoma Raceway	(United States) Matthew Brabham	(United States) Helio Meza	No entries	(United States) Chris Coffey	No entries	(United States) Cole Moore	No entries
1	2	Sonoma Raceway	(United States) Matthew Brabham	(United States) Helio Meza	No entries	(United States) Chris Coffey	No entries	(United States) Phil Fogg Jr	No entries
2	3	Laguna Seca							
2	4	Laguna Seca							
3	5	Circuit of the Americas							

== Championship Standings ==
=== Points System ===
Race Position	**1**	**2**	**3**	**4**	**5**	**6**	**7**	**8**	**9**	**10**	**11**	**12**	**13**	**14**	**15**	**16**	**17**	**18**	**19**	**20**	**21**	**22**	**23**	**24**	**25**	**26**	**27**	**28**	**29**	**30**	**31**	**32**	**33**	**34**	**35**	**36**	**37**	**38**	**39**	**40**
Points	103	98	93	88	84	80	76	72	68	64	60	57	54	51	48	45	42	39	36	33	30	28	26	24	22	20	18	16	14	12	10	9	8	7	6	5	4	3	2	1

Qualifying Position	**1st**	**2nd**	**3rd**	**4th**	**5th**
Points	5	4	3	2	1

=== National Championship ===
==== TA ====
Pos.	Driver	SEB (Florida)	ATL (Georgia (U.S. state))	SON (California)		LRP (Connecticut)	IMS (Indiana)	ELK (Wisconsin)	WGL (New York (state))		MOS (Canada)	VIR (Virginia)	AUS (Texas)	Points
Pos.	Driver	1	2	3	4	5	6	7	8	9	10	11	12	Points
1	(United States) Matthew Brabham	**1**^{5}	**1**^{5}	**1**^{5}	**1**^{5}	**5**^{5}	**1**^{5}	**1**^{5}	**1**^{5}	**1**^{5}				938
2	(United States) Paul Menard	2^{4}	2^{4}	2^{2}	2^{4}	1^{4}	3^{3}	4^{4}	2^{4}	3^{4}				888
3	(United States) Tomy Drissi	8^{2}	3^{3}	3^{1}	5^{2}	2^{1}	6^{1}	2^{3}	5^{2}	5^{1}				796
4	(United States) David Pintaric	7^{1}	7^{1}	4^{3}	4^{1}	3^{2}	5	3^{2}	4	4^{2}				781
5	(United States) Chris Dyson					4^{3}	4^{2}		3^{3}	2^{3}				375
6	(United States) Simon Gregg	9	6	5	3									325
7	(United States) Jon DeGaynor		6				8	5	DNS	6				317
8	(Austria) Martin Ragginger	3^{3}	8				2							270
9	(United States) Kaylee Bryson	5	5				9							236
10	(United States) Adam Andretti	4	4^{2}											177
11	(United States) Amy Ruman						7	DNS	DNS	7				153
12	(Brazil) Rafa Matos			6	DNS									84
13	(United States) Boris Said						10							64
Pos.	Driver	SEB (Florida)	ATL (Georgia (U.S. state))	SON (California)		LRP (Connecticut)	IMS (Indiana)	ELK (Wisconsin)	WGL (New York (state))		MOS (Canada)	VIR (Virginia)	AUS (Texas)	Points

Colour	Result
Gold	Winner
Silver	Second place
Bronze	Third place
Green	Points classification
Blue	Non-points classification
Blue	Non-classified finish (NC)
Purple	Retired, not classified (Ret)
Red	Did not qualify (DNQ)
Red	Did not pre-qualify (DNPQ)
Black	Disqualified (DSQ)
White	Did not start (DNS)
White	Withdrew (WD)
White	Race cancelled (C)
Blank	Did not practice (DNP)
Blank	Did not arrive (DNA)
Blank	Excluded (EX)

**Bold** – Pole
Italics – Fastest Lap
^{5, 4, 3, 2, 1} – points earned from qualifying positions
