= Helio Meza =

Mexican-American racing driver

- Meza in 2026
- Born: November 27, 2007 (age 18)

CARS Late Model Stock Tour career
- Debut season: 2025
- Years active: 2025–present
- Starts: 3
- Championships: 0
- Wins: 0
- Poles: 0
- Best finish: 48th in 2026

ARCA Menards Series West career
- 2 races run over 1 year
- Best finish: 42nd (2026)
- First race: 2026 Kyle Busch Classic (LVMS Bullring)
- Last race: 2026 Desert Diamond Casino West Valley 100 (Phoenix)
Wins	Top tens	Poles
0	0	1
- Statistics up to date as of November 2, 2026.

Helio Meza (born November 27, 2007) is a Mexican-American professional auto racing driver. He last competed in the Trans-Am Series, driving the No. 28 Chevrolet Camaro for Alessandro Racing & Team SLR in the TA2 class, and part-time in the ARCA Menards Series West, driving the No. 28 Chevrolet for Pinnacle Racing Group.

== Early life ==
Meza was raised in Houston, Texas.

== Career ==
In 2023, Meza competed in the Lucas Oil Formula Car Race Series, where he finished third in the standings with three wins. It was during this year that he was one of the winners in the Spec MX-5 Shootout.

In 2024, Meza competed in the NACAM Formula 4 Championship, driving for Alessandros Racing, where he finished runner-up in the championship to José Carlos Hernández with two wins. During this year, he won a Spec MX-5 Scholarship for the season. He also ran a partial schedule in the Mikel's Trucks Series, where he won two races, as well as the NASCAR Mexico Challenge Series.

In 2025, Meza ran full-time in the Mazda MX-5 Cup, where he drove for BSI Racing. He finished fifth in the final standings with two podium finishes at the Mid-Ohio Sports Car Course and Canadian Tire Motorsports Park. He also ran all but one race in the NASCAR Mexico Challenge Series, driving the No. 27 for Alessandros Racing, where he won four races and finished runner-up in the standings to Diego Ortíz. Alongside those campaigns, Meza made his debut in the Trans-Am Series at the Circuit of the Americas, where he won in the TA2 class. He also competed his select late-model races, primarily at Hickory Motor Speedway, including make his debut in the CARS Late Model Stock Tour at Florence Motor Speedway, driving the No. 27 for Matt Piercy Racing.

In 2026, Meza will drive full-time in the Trans-Am Series, driving the No. 28 Chevrolet for Alessandros Racing & Team SLR in the TA2 class.

=== ARCA Menards Series West ===
Meza's No. 28 car at the Las Vegas Motor Speedway Bullring in 2026

In September 2026, it was revealed that Meza will make his debut in the ARCA Menards Series West at the Las Vegas Motor Speedway Bullring, driving the No. 28 Chevrolet for Pinnacle Racing Group.

== Personal life ==
Meza was born with microtia atresia, and received a bone conduction hearing aid at an early age. At the age of seven, he received surgery to get a bone anchored implant. When he transitioned from karting to cars, Meza's father came up with a bone conduction system inside of his racing helmet.

== Motorsports career results ==
=== Complete NACAM Formula 4 Championship results ===
(key) (Races in bold indicate pole position) (Races in italics indicate fastest lap)

Year	Team	1	2	3	4	5	6	7	8	9	10	11	12	13	14	15	16	17	DC	Points
2024	Alessandros Racing	AHR1; 1; 3	AHR1; 2; 2	**PUE**; **1**; 1	PUE; 2; 2	**PUE**; **3**; 1	AHR2; 1; 3	AHR2; 2; 3	AHR2; 3; 4										2nd	143
2025	Alessandros Blue	PUE1; 1	PUE1; 2	PUE1; 3	AHR1; 1	AHR1; 2	AHR1; 3	AHR2; 1	AHR2; 2	AHR2; 3	AHR3; 1	AHR3; 2	AHR3; 3	PUE2; 1	PUE2; 2	PUE2; 3	**AHR4**; **1**; 1	AHR4; 2; 2	12th	43

=== ARCA Menards Series West ===
(key) (Bold – Pole position awarded by qualifying time. Italics – Pole position earned by points standings or practice time. * – Most laps led. ** – All laps led.)

ARCA Menards Series West results
Year	Team	No.	Make	1	2	3	4	5	6	7	8	9	10	11	12	13	AMSWC	Pts	Ref
2026	Pinnacle Racing Group	28	Chevy	KER	PHO	TUC	SHA	CNS	TRI	SON	PIR	AAS	MAD	**LVS**; 18	PHO; 23	KER	42nd	49	

=== CARS Late Model Stock Car Tour ===
(key) (Bold – Pole position awarded by qualifying time. Italics – Pole position earned by points standings or practice time. * – Most laps led. ** – All laps led.)

CARS Late Model Stock Car Tour results
Year	Team	No.	Make	1	2	3	4	5	6	7	8	9	10	11	12	13	14	15	CLMSCTC	Pts	Ref
2025	Matt Piercy Racing	27	Chevy	AAS	WCS	CDL	OCS	ACE	NWS	LGY	DOM	CRW	HCY	AND	FLC; 15	SBO	TCM	NWS	71st	27	
2026	Matt Piercy Racing	7	Chevy	SNM	WCS	NSV	CRW	ACE	LGY	DOM; 12	NWS	HCY; 14	AND	FLC	TCM	NPS	SBO		48th	58	
