= Summit Point Motorsports Park =

Motorsports Park in West Virginia

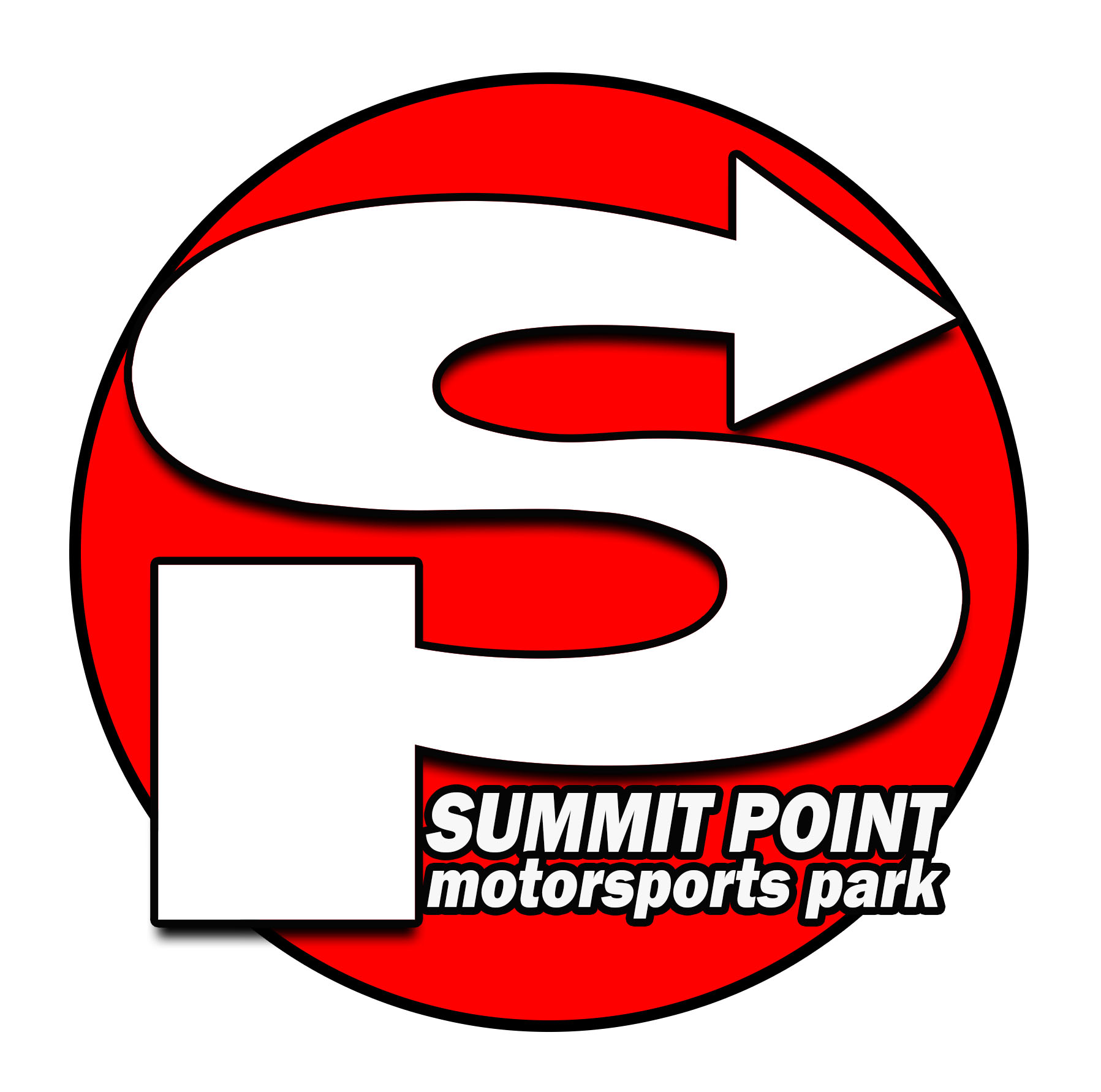

- Summit Point Main Circuit (1970–present)
- Location: Summit Point, WV, USA
- Coordinates: 39°14′3.8″N 77°58′31.04″W
- Capacity: open seating without capacity limitation
- Owner: Bill Scott Racing, Inc.
- Operator: Bill Scott Racing, Inc.
- Broke ground: 1969
- Opened: October 1969; 57 years ago
- Former names: Summit Point Raceway (1969–2003)
- Major events: Current: Atlantic Championship (2017–2019, 2023–present); Former: 12 Hours at the Point (1999–2009); Formula D (2007); IMSA GT Championship (1971, 1982, 1987–1989); Can-Am (1986); Trans-Am Series (1983–1985)

Summit Point Main Circuit (1970–present)
- Length: 3.219 km (2.000 mi)
- Turns: 10
- Race lap record: 1:03.862 ( (United States) Harbir Dass, Swift 016.a, 2026, Formula Atlantic)

Jefferson Circuit (1996–present)
- Length: 1.771 km (1.100 mi)
- Turns: 7

Shenandoah Circuit (2004–present)
- Length: 3.540 km (2.200 mi)
- Turns: 22

Summit Point Original Circuit (1969–1970)
- Length: 3.219 km (2.000 mi)
- Turns: 8

Summit Point Motorsports Park is a road racing and driver training facility located in Jefferson County, West Virginia about two hours west of Washington, D.C. in the state's Eastern Panhandle.

== Current status ==
Summit Point Motorsports Park features three road racing circuits that are currently used for amateur automobile, motorcycle racing, and contracted government training.

== History ==
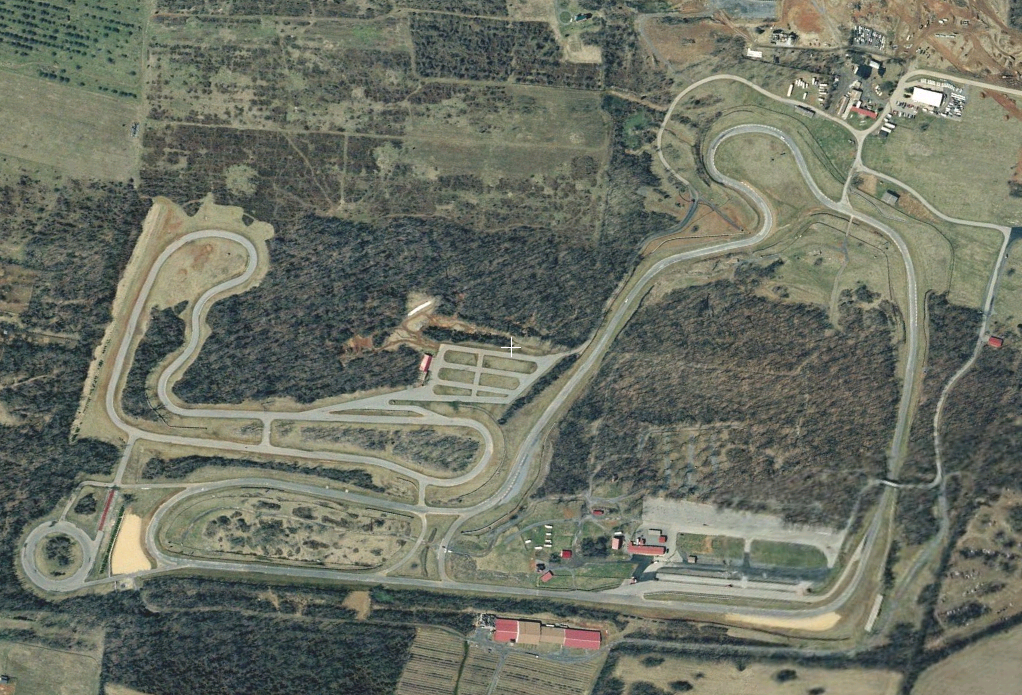
The aerial view of the Summit Point Main Circuit and Jefferson Circuit

Designed and built in 1969–1970 by local auto racing businessman Pat Goodman, Summit Point Motorsports Park (then "Summit Point Raceway"), opened in October 1969.

The first races held there were SCCA regional races in the fall of 1969 with IMSA International Sedans being the first professional event, later to become The Radial Tire Series, and IMSA Pro Formula Ford. The event was held on Memorial Day, May 30, 1970. (The holiday was still celebrated on the 30th then.) Rasey Feezell won in an Alfa Romeo 4-door sedan, whose modifications were very questionable, taking home the grand sum of $200 prize money. Five of the eleven entrants were from Raleigh, North Carolina.

During its early years and since SCCA held numerous events at the track. Several Regional and National races were run each year. Many racers got their start in the popular SCCA Driver's Schools held there by the Washington DC Region.

Paul Newman ran several of his early races there in a Bob Sharp-prepared Datsun 510 sedan. He wished to be just another "racer" and did not want to be recognized at racing events as a "superstar", so he and wife Joanne Woodward kept to themselves and eschewed signing autographs. Few realized they were racing in the company of famous actors. The only outward clue was the plate on his 510's front bumper... "PLN"

Over time the track was host to a number of professional races sanctioned by IMSA and the SCCA Trans-Am Series through the late 1980s.

The track was sold to Bill Scott and his partner Tom Milner in the early 1980s. Bill was 1970 Formula Vee World Champion Bill Scott.

The Sportscar Vintage Racing Association returned to Summit Point in 2023 after a two-decade absence.

In addition to racing, the track became a training ground for various federal agencies and other security organizations.

== Circuits ==
Summit Point Main layout (1970–present)

=== Summit Point Main ===
Summit Point Main is a 10-turn, 2.000 mi (3.219 km) road course that features a 2,900 ft (880 m) main straight. This original circuit opened in 1970.

The original layout did not include the "Carousel", presently denoted Turns 6 and 7. In the original layout, Turn 5 was a ~90 deg. left-hander leading to a 90 deg. right-hander at the entry to what is now denoted Turn 8. Therefore, the original layout had 8 turns (or 9 depending on how you counted them). The "Carousel" wasn't added until sometime after mid-1973.

No longer used for professional auto races, it hosts many WKC, WKA, SCCA, Audi, Mazda Drivers, BMWCCA, N2 Track Days, and NASA club races, track days, and schools. In addition, motorcycle races are run by CCS and WERA.

The Main Circuit is also the annual home of the Jefferson 500 vintage race and The 12 Hours at the Point endurance race.

The Main Circuit was repaved in the Fall of 2017.

Jefferson Circuit layout (1996–present)

=== Jefferson Circuit ===
The Jefferson Circuit is a Nine-turn, 1.100 mi (1.770 km) road course that was designed and built by Bill Scott as a dedicated course for high-performance, accident avoidance and emergency operation driver training. Opened in 1996, the Jefferson is a course that demands constant attentiveness and smooth inputs from drivers.

The circuit hosts a number of driver training schools, as well as a handful of motorcycle trackdays each year.

=== Shenandoah Circuit ===
Shenandoah Circuit layout (2004–present)

The Shenandoah Circuit is a 22-turn, 2.200 mi (3.541 km) road course that first opened in 2004. Widely considered one of the most technical circuits of the recent crop of race courses, the Shenandoah also boasts a smaller scale replica of the Nürburgring-Nordschleife's famous banked Karussell turn. It is also known as the concrete jungle.

Since opening in late 2004, the Shenandoah has played host to a number of high-performance driver education clinics, a handful of road races and a number of motorcycle races. After a number of races and schools, minor changes were made to the track layout in late 2004 and early 2005, including the addition of a straight between turns 5 and 7.

=== Washington Circuit ===
The Washington Circuit is Summit Point's newest addition constructed and opened in 2009.

Several layouts are used depending on the types of events occurring and the weather conditions, but the course is most often configured as the "Washington Long Course". This is 0.520 mi (0.837 km) and 11 turns, including a sweeping 160-degree decreasing radius corner and 3 straights.

== Lap records ==
As of August 2026, the fastest official race lap records at Summit Point Motorsports Park are listed as:

Category	Time	Driver	Vehicle	Event
Summit Point Main Circuit (1970–present): 2.000 mi (3.219 km)
Formula Atlantic	1:03.862	Harbir Dass	Swift 014.a	2026 Summit Point Atlantic Championship round
IMSA GTO	1:12.240	Pete Halsmer	Mercury Cougar XR-7	1989 Summit Point Grand Prix
Can-Am	1:12.650	Horst Kroll	Frissbee KR3	1986 SCCA Can-Am Challenge Summit Point
Trans-Am	1:15.460	Willy T. Ribbs	Mercury Capri	1985 Summit Point Trans-Am round
IMSA GTU	1:18.070	John Overton	Mazda RX-7	1989 Summit Point Grand Prix
IMSA AC	1:18.760	Tommy Riggins	Buick Somerset	1989 Summit Point Grand Prix
