= Summit Point, West Virginia =

- Unincorporated community
- Location within West Virginia Location within the United States
- Coordinates: 39°14′58″N 77°57′31″W
- Country: United States
- State: West Virginia
- County: Jefferson
- Time zone: UTC-5 (Eastern (EST))
  - Summer (DST): UTC-4 (EDT)
- ZIP codes: 25446
- GNIS ID: 1555747

Summit Point is an unincorporated community in Jefferson County in the U.S. state of West Virginia.

The community is located along the Baltimore and Ohio Railroad at the intersection of West Virginia Secondary Route 1 and Summit Point Pike in the lower Shenandoah Valley.

It was the birthplace of James Carson Breckinridge, A Marine Corps General and Recipient of the Navy Cross and the Order of Military Merit
