= Josh Pierson =

American racing driver (born 2006)

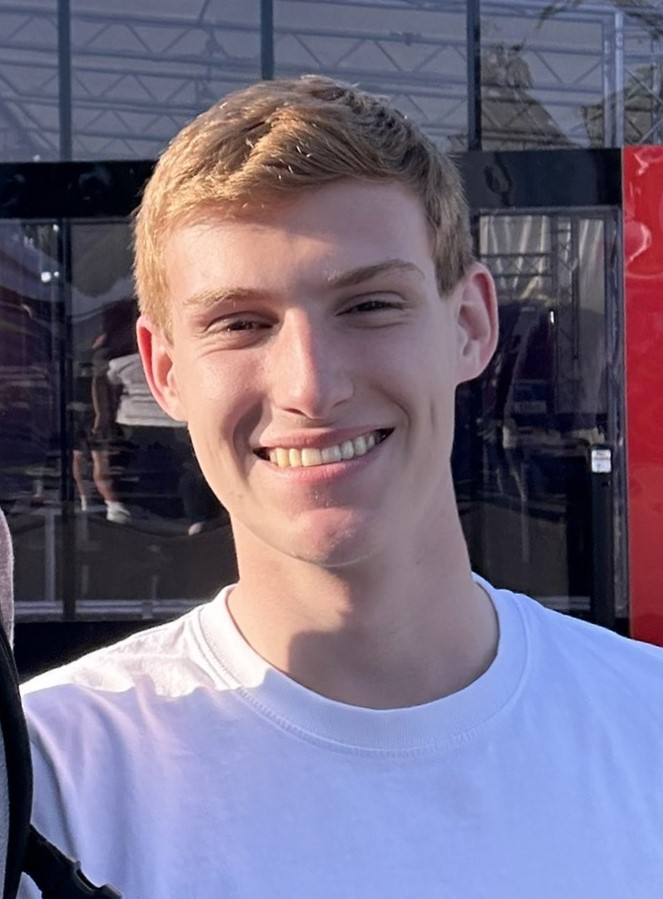
- Pierson in 2023
- Nationality: (United States) American
- Born: Joshua Pierson; February 14, 2006 (age 20) Portland, Oregon, United States
- Categorisation: FIA Silver (2022–2023); FIA Gold (2024–)

IndyCar Series career
- Team: No. 4 (A. J. Foyt Racing)
Wins	Podiums	Poles
0	0	0

Previous series
- 2023—2026 2022–2023 2022 2020–2021 2020: Indy NXT; FIA World Endurance Championship; Asian Le Mans Series - LMP2; U.S. F2000 Championship; F1600 Championship Series

24 Hours of Le Mans career
- Years: 2022–2023
- Teams: United Autosports
- Best finish: 10th (2022)
- Class wins: 0

Joshua Pierson (born February 14, 2006) is an American racing driver who is set to compete in the IndyCar Series, driving the No. 4 Chevrolet for A. J. Foyt Racing. Pierson previously drove in Indy NXT for Andretti Global, the FIA World Endurance Championship in LMP2 for United Autosports, and is the youngest driver to start the 24 Hours of Le Mans at 16 years and 119 days.

== Racing career ==
=== Early career ===
==== Karting ====
Having begun his karting career aged two when his father Greg bought him a go-kart, Pierson soon began competing in regional and national competitions. The American would win a number of accolades during the 2010s, most notably winning the Rotax Florida Winter Tour in 2016 and taking home the US Rotax Grand Nationals title the subsequent year.

=== Sportscar career ===
==== FIA World Endurance Championship ====
===== 2022: LMP2 debut =====
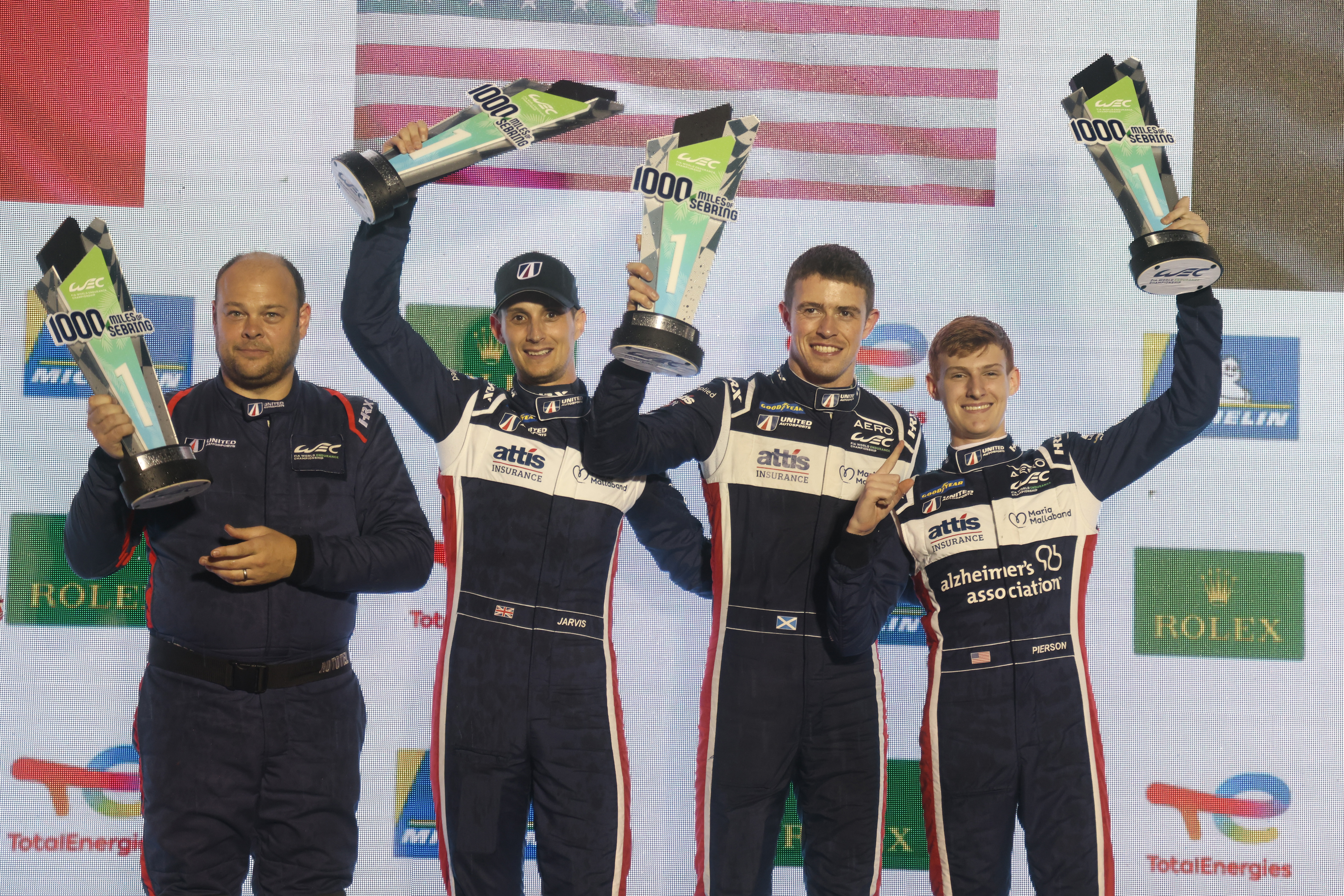
Pierson and the No. 23 United Autosports USA team won the race at Sebring in LMP2 class in 2022.

On August 17, 2021, United Autosports announced that it had signed Pierson to compete in the LMP2 category of the 2022 FIA World Endurance Championship. This would make Pierson the youngest ever driver to compete in the 24 Hours of Le Mans at 16 years and 119 days. Having gathered some prototype racing experience at the 24 Hours of Daytona and two rounds of the Asian Le Mans Series, where he managed to take two victories in as many starts, Pierson won his debut race at the 1000 Miles of Sebring alongside teammates Oliver Jarvis and Paul di Resta. With the team having controlled the race before an untimely red flag brought a premature end to proceedings, Pierson became the youngest race winner in series history. Following a points-scoring round in Spa, Pierson claimed the record of being the youngest starter at Le Mans and ended up finishing sixth. More points were scored in the subsequent two races, which brought the No. 23 United crew into outside contention for the LMP2 title come the 8 Hours of Bahrain. Despite finishing second during the race, the result would only yield third in the teams' championship for Pierson and Jarvis, though the American would receive an award for being the "Revelation of the Year" of the 2022 WEC campaign.

===== 2023: Return to United =====
Pierson re-signed with United Autosports to compete in the 2023 WEC season, once again partnering Oliver Jarvis, with a revolving door of drivers claiming the lineup's third seat. Beginning his sophomore season in the WEC at Sebring, Pierson would inherit the lead from Jarvis and extend their gap during a triple stint. However, their strong race came undone as an onboard camera inside of Pierson's car came loose and hit the ignition switch, pushing it out and causing the No. 23 United to come to a halt, forcing them to retire in what Co-Owner Richard Dean described as "a one in a million thing". The team bounced back strongly in Portugal, where Pierson, Jarvis and Giedo van der Garde fought to take victory, overcoming a radio issue for Jarvis during their penultimate pitstop that had dropped them to second. Another podium followed at the 6 Hours of Spa-Francorchamps, where teammate Tom Blomqvist narrowly missed out on the win to Louis Delétraz in the No. 41 WRT. The Centenary 24 Hours of Le Mans did not yield much success, as Blomqvist experienced a crash following a loss of brakes, leading to an eighth-placed finish, meanwhile Pierson and the team would miss out on a podium again during the Monza round, as a last-lap pass from Delétraz on Jarvis relegated the No. 23 to fourth by the flag. Fuji ended up burying any remaining title ambitions for Pierson, who finished fourth alongside Jarvis and Ben Hanley; Pierson had shown impressive pace, though he was also involved in a collision with Rui Andrade for which he was given a ten-second penalty which set the team back, before Hanley lost further time when he was hit by João Paulo de Oliveira's Vanwall. After taking eighth place in Bahrain, Pierson and Jarvis finished fifth in the drivers' standings.

==== IMSA WeatherTech SportsCar Championship ====
===== 2022: IMSA debut =====
Parallel to his WEC commitments, Pierson also partook in a full-time campaign in the IMSA SportsCar Championship as part of the PR1/Mathiasen Motorsports team. Pierson finished sixth in the drivers' standings, having gotten a podium finish at the season-ending Petit Le Mans race.

===== 2023: Switch to TDS Racing =====
For 2023, Pierson would join series newcomer TDS Racing for that year's endurance rounds of the IMSA SportsCar Championship.

=== American open-wheel racing career ===
==== Lower formulas / IndyCar ladder ====
At the age of 14, Pierson made his car racing debut in 2020, competing for Exclusive Autosport in the U.S. F2000 National Championship and partaking in two rounds of the F1600 Championship Series. The campaign did not amount to much, as Pierson ended up finishing twentieth in the drivers' standings.

Pierson would return to the USF2000 Championship the following year, this time as part of the Pabst Racing outfit alongside Jace Denmark and Yuven Sundaramoorthy. He started out strongly, scoring a pair of third places at Barber, before bettering that performance with two runner-up spots on the Indy Road Course. Pierson continued to take regular finishes inside the top ten for the remainder of the season, though he would only manage to add one further podium to his name. He ended the year fourth overall, one place behind teammate Sundaramoorthy.

==== Indy NXT ====
===== 2023: Rookie season =====
Alongside his endurance racing commitments, Pierson rejoined the Road to Indy ladder to contest the 2023 Indy NXT campaign with HMD Motorsports. Having missed five races, he ended up 15th in the standings, scoring a best finish of sixth at Iowa.

===== 2024: First full-time season =====
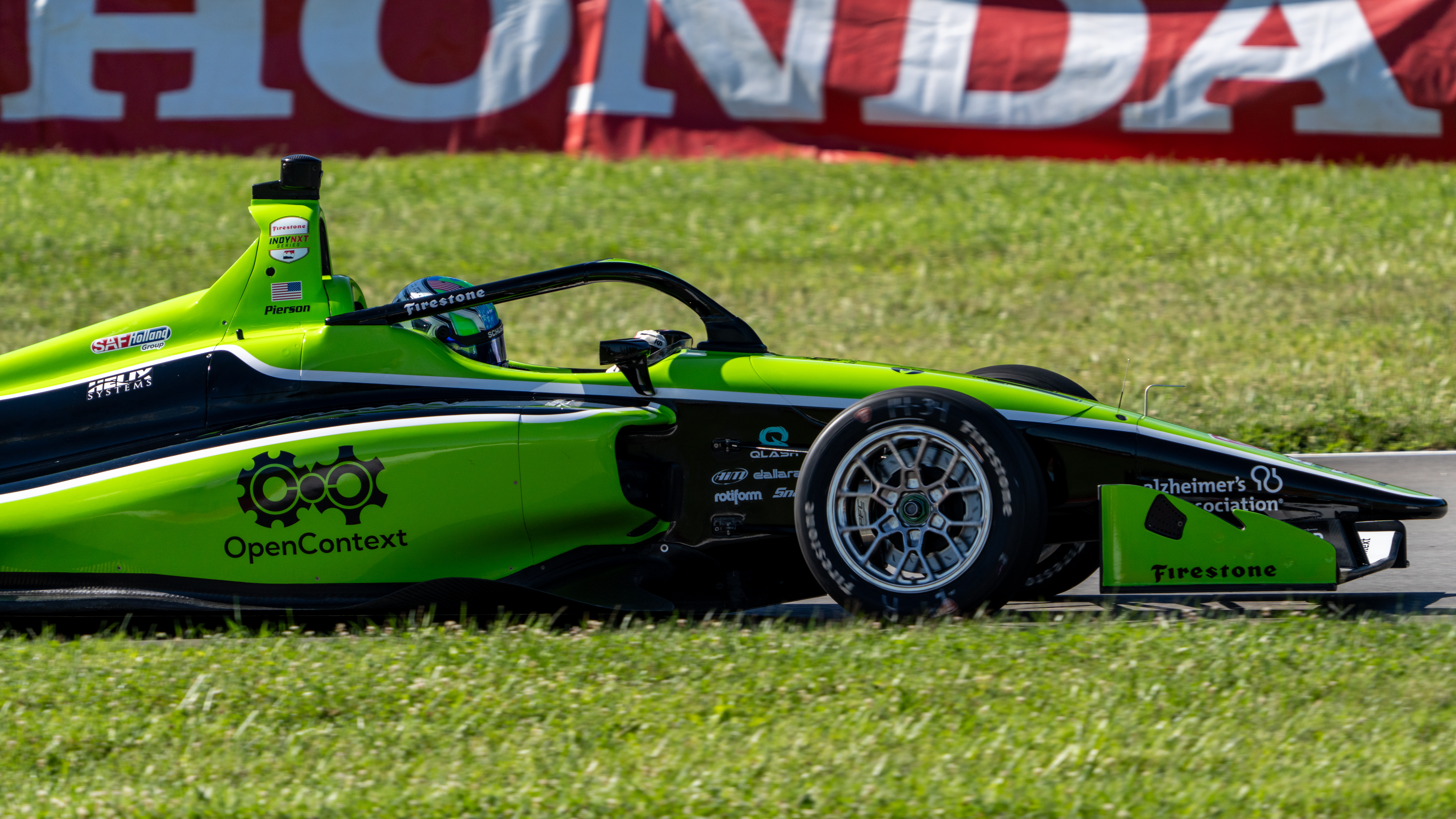
Pierson at Mid-Ohio Sports Car Course in 2024

Pierson remained in Indy NXT for 2024, still driving for HMD Motorsports, but on a full-time schedule. During the season opener at St. Petersburg, Pierson collided with Jamie Chadwick and was penalised for avoidable contact, eventually ending up thirteenth.

===== 2025 =====
Pierson was retained by HMD Motorsports for a third season of Indy NXT in 2025. At Laguna Seca, Pierson claimed his first Indy NXT podium with a third place finish.

===== 2026: Switch to Andretti Global =====
For the 2026 season, Pierson switched to Andretti Global after three years of competing with HMD Motorsports. At Gateway and Road America Race 1, Pierson scored podium finishes. Pierson took his maiden pole position in qualifying for the penultimate weekend at the Milwaukee Mile. He led from the start, controlling the opening stint before he spun out of an unthreatened lead on lap 54 and crashed. Pierson began the first leg of the season-ending double-header at Laguna Seca with another pole position. Pierson controlled the race in front and took his maiden series victory.

==== IndyCar Series ====
Pierson joined Ed Carpenter Racing's new racing programme for 2023, becoming a development driver for the 2023 IndyCar Series.

===== 2027: Full-time with A. J. Foyt Racing =====
On October 14, 2026, Pierson passed his IndyCar evaluation and licensing test on the Indianapolis Motor Speedway Road Course driving for A. J. Foyt Enterprises. On October 27, it was confirmed that Pierson would drive the No. 4 Chevrolet for A. J. Foyt.

== Racing record ==
=== Career summary ===
Season	Series	Team	Races	Wins	Poles	F/Laps	Podiums	Points	Position
2020	F1600 Championship Series	lovation, TransUnion	6	0	0	0	2	152	16th
2020	U.S. F2000 National Championship	Exclusive Autosport	16	0	0	0	0	57	20th
2021	U.S. F2000 National Championship	Pabst Racing	18	0	0	0	5	291	4th
2022	Asian Le Mans Series - LMP2	United Autosports	2	2	0	0	2	0	NC†
2022	FIA World Endurance Championship - LMP2	United Autosports	6	1	0	0	2	113	**3rd**
2022	24 Hours of Le Mans - LMP2	United Autosports	1	0	0	0	0	N/A	6th
2022	IMSA SportsCar Championship - LMP2	PR1/Mathiasen Motorsports	7	0	0	0	1	1809	6th
2023	Indy NXT	HMD Motorsports	9	0	0	0	0	173	15th
2023	FIA World Endurance Championship - LMP2	United Autosports	7	1	0	0	2	92	5th
2023	24 Hours of Le Mans - LMP2	United Autosports	1	0	0	0	0	N/A	8th
2023	IMSA SportsCar Championship - LMP2	TDS Racing	4	0	0	0	1	892	14th
2024	Indy NXT	HMD Motorsports	14	0	0	0	0	264	14th
2025	Indy NXT	HMD Motorsports	14	0	0	1	2	378	6th
2025	Formula Regional Oceania Championship	mtec Motorsport	12	0	0	2	3	219	7th
2026	Indy NXT	Andretti Global	17	1	2	1	3	364	11th
2027	IndyCar Series	A. J. Foyt Racing						-*	-*

* Season still in progress.
^{†} As Pierson was a guest driver, he was ineligible to score points.

=== American open-wheel racing results ===
==== F1600 Championship Series ====
(key) (Races in bold indicate pole position) (Races in italics indicate fastest lap)

Year	Team	1	2	3	4	5	6	7	8	9	10	11	12	13	14	15	16	17	18	Rank	Points
2020	Exclusive Autosport	PIT; 17	PIT; 6	PIT; 4	MOH	MOH	MOH	VIR	VIR	VIR	SPMP	SPMP	SPMP	PIT; 3	PIT; 2	PIT; DNF	ATL	ATL	ATL	16th	152

==== U.S. F2000 National Championship ====
(key) (Races in bold indicate pole position) (Races in italics indicate fastest lap)

Year	Team	1	2	3	4	5	6	7	8	9	10	11	12	13	14	15	16	17	18	Rank	Points
2020	Exclusive Autosport	ROA; 13	ROA; 19	MOH; 15	MOH; 16	MOH; 17	LOR; 19	IMS; 17	IMS; 18	IMS; 12	MOH; 17	MOH; 16	MOH; 18	NJMP; 13	NJMP; 10	NJMP; 10	STP; 15	STP; DNS		20th	57
2021	Pabst Racing	ALA; 3	ALA; 3	STP; 7	STP; 10	IMS; 4	IMS; 2	IMS; 2	LOR; 8	ROA; 9	ROA; 3	MOH; 8	MOH; 12	MOH; 11	NJMP; 6	NJMP; 11	NJMP; 5	MOH; 11	MOH; 6	4th	291

==== Indy NXT ====
(key) (Races in bold indicate pole position) (Races in italics indicate fastest lap) (Races with ^{L} indicate a race lap led) (Races with * indicate most race laps led)

Year	Team	1	2	3	4	5	6	7	8	9	10	11	12	13	14	15	16	17	Rank	Points
2023	HMD Motorsports	STP; 16	BAR	IMS; 17	DET	DET	RDA; 11	MOH; 9	IOW; 6	NSH; 10	IMS; 8	GMP; 10	POR; 17	LAG	LAG				15th	173
2024	HMD Motorsports	STP; 13	BAR; 17	IMS; 21	IMS; 12	DET; 8	RDA; 7	LAG; 13	LAG; 9	MOH; 9	IOW; 11	GMP; 13	POR; 9	MIL; 12	NSH; 10				14th	264
2025	HMD Motorsports	STP; 9	BAR; 5	IMS; 6	IMS; 9	DET; 4	GMP; 6	RDA; 4	MOH; 5	IOW; 11	LAG; 3	LAG; 2	POR; 11	MIL; 11	NSH; 9				6th	378
2026	Andretti Global	STP; 7	ARL; 23	BAR; 24	BAR; 14	IMS; 6	IMS; 8	DET; 14	GAT; 3	ROA; 2	ROA; 22	MOH; 11	MOH; 6	NSS; 6	POR; 21	**MIL**; 22*	**LAG**; 1*	LAG; 24	11th	364

==== IndyCar Series ====
(key)

Year	Team	No.	Chassis	Engine	1	2	3	4	5	6	7	8	9	10	11	12	13	14	15	16	17	Rank	Points	Ref
2027	A. J. Foyt Enterprises	4	Dallara DW12	Chevrolet	STP	PHX	ARL	ALA	LBH	IMS	INDY	DET	GTW	ROA	MOH	BCN	POR	MRK	MIL	MIL	LAG	-*	0*	

==== Indianapolis 500 ====
Year	Chassis	Engine	Start	Finish	Team
2027	Dallara	Chevrolet			A. J. Foyt Enterprises

* Season still in progress.

=== Complete WeatherTech SportsCar Championship results ===
(key) (Races in bold indicate pole position; results in italics indicate fastest lap)

Year	Team	Class	Make	Engine	1	2	3	4	5	6	7	Pos.	Points
2022	PR1/Mathiasen Motorsports	LMP2	Oreca 07	Gibson GK428 4.2 L V8	DAY; 8	SEB; 4	LGA; 4	MOH; 6	WGL; 6	ELK; 5	PET; 3	6th	1809
2023	TDS Racing	LMP2	Oreca 07	Gibson GK428 4.2 L V8	DAY; 4	SEB; 8	MON	WGL; 4	ELK	IMS	PET; 2	14th	892

=== Complete FIA World Endurance Championship results ===
(key) (Races in bold indicate pole position) (Races in italics indicate fastest lap)

Year	Entrant	Class	Chassis	Engine	1	2	3	4	5	6	7	Rank	Points
2022	United Autosports USA	LMP2	Oreca 07	Gibson GK428 4.2 L V8	SEB; 1	SPA; 6	LMS; 6	MNZ; 5	FUJ; 5	BHR; 2		3rd	113
2023	United Autosports	LMP2	Oreca 07	Gibson GK428 4.2 L V8	**SEB**; Ret	PRT; 1	**SPA**; 2	LMS; 6	MNZ; 4	FUJ; 4	**BHR**; 8	5th	92

=== Complete 24 Hours of Le Mans results ===
Year	Team	Co-Drivers	Car	Class	Laps	Pos.	Class Pos.
2022	(United States) United Autosports USA	(United Kingdom) Alex Lynn (United Kingdom) Oliver Jarvis	Oreca 07-Gibson	LMP2	368	10th	6th
2023	(United Kingdom) United Autosports	(United Kingdom) Tom Blomqvist (United Kingdom) Oliver Jarvis	Oreca 07-Gibson	LMP2	323	18th	8th

=== Complete Formula Regional Oceania Championship results ===
(key) (Races in bold indicate pole position) (Races in italics indicate fastest lap)

Year	Team	1	2	3	4	5	6	7	8	9	10	11	12	13	14	15	DC	Points
2025	mtec Motorsport	TAU; 1; 8	TAU; 2; 2	TAU; 3; 6	HMP; 1; 4	HMP; 2; 6	HMP; 3; 3	MAN; 1; 5	MAN; 2; 3	MAN; 3; 9	TER; 1; 6	TER; 2; 5	TER; 3; 6	HIG; 1	HIG; 2	HIG; 3	7th	219
