= 2020 F1600 Championship Series =

9th season of the F1600 Championship Series

2020 F1600 season

Season
- Races: 18
- Start date: June 19
- End date: October 31

Awards
- Drivers' champion: (United States) Simon Sikes
- Manufacturers' Cup: (France) Mygale

The 2020 F1600 Championship Series season was the ninth season of the F1600 Championship Series. The previous year's champion was Jonathan Kotyk of K-Hill Motorsports.

Simon Sikes’ performances in the F1600 Championship Series helped him earn a spot as a Team USA scholar and allowed him to make his debut in the USF2000 before the year ended. During his short time in the Road to Indy, he achieved his best finish in fourth place.

In the end, he easily won the F1600 title, beating karting graduate Dylan Christie and Dexter Czuba. He also took home the SCCA National Runoff title in Formula F.

Jackson Lee won two races in the F1600 series but missed a third of the season. He finished fourth in the points standings. His status as a Team USA scholar allowed him to travel to England to compete in the National FF1600 finale and other important races at the end of the year. His best finish was 10th place in the final race of the FFord Festival.

Maxwell Esterson joined him on the flight across the ocean. Esterson won one F1600 race and finished 14th in the WHT.

== Drivers and teams ==
Pro Division
Team/Sponsor	No.	Drivers	Class	Rounds	Chassis	Engine
(Canada) Rice Race Prep	6	(United States) Simon Sikes		All	Mygale	Honda
(Canada) Rice Race Prep	13	(United States) Burton August		4–6; 10–12	Mygale	Honda
(Canada) Rice Race Prep	13	(United States) Steve Oseth	M	7–9	Mygale	Honda
(Canada) Rice Race Prep	13	(United States) Jason Pribyl		13–15	Mygale	Honda
(Canada) Rice Race Prep	52	(United States) Jackson Lee		1–12	Mygale	Honda
(Canada) Rice Race Prep	52	(United States) Trey Burke		13–18	Mygale	Honda
(United States) Drivers Services	2	(United States) Mike Scanlan	M	1–3; 7–18	Spectrum	Honda
(United States) Brad Hayes Racing	74	(United States) Jonathan Kotyk		1–6	Piper	Honda
(United States) Team Pelfrey	23	Baylor Griffin		16–18	Mygale	Honda
(United States) Team Pelfrey	80	(United States) Maxwell Esterson		1–15	Mygale	Honda
(United States) Team Pelfrey	81	(United States) Dylan Christie		1–3	Mygale	Honda
(United States) Team Pelfrey	81	(United States) Dexter Czuba		4–15	Mygale	Honda
(United States) Team Pelfrey	81	(United States) David Adorno		16–18	Mygale	Honda
(United States) Team Pelfrey	82	(United States) Dexter Czuba		1–3	Mygale	Honda
(United States) Team Pelfrey	82	(United States) Dylan Christie		4–18	Mygale	Honda
(United States) Raceworks	42	(United States) Ryan Bjerke		7–12	Spectrum	Honda
(United States) Raceworks	70	(United States) Sam Lockwood	M	1–6	Spectrum	Honda
(United States) Raceworks	76	(United States) Ax Kametches		1–6	Spectrum	Honda
Dole Fuels	4	(United States) John Dole	M	1–3	Spectrum	Honda
Dole Fuels	4	(United States) Glen Cordova	M	13–15	Spectrum	Honda
(United States) Auriana Racing	3	(United States) Joe Colasacco	M	13–15	Van Diemen	Honda
(United States) Auriana Racing	5	(United States) Joe Colasacco	M	7–12	Van Diemen	Honda
ATC Technologies Inc.	11	(United States) Christopher Kierce		10–12; 16–18	Spectrum	Honda
Weiss	12	(United States) Bob Reid	M	1–15	Citation	Honda
(United States) K-Hill Motorsports	12	(United States) Ax Kametches		16–18	Mygale	Honda
(United States) K-Hill Motorsports	27	Bryson Morris		16–18	Mygale	Honda
(United States) K-Hill Motorsports	90	(United States) Omar Khan		All	Mygale	Honda
Polestar	18	(United States) Robert Dietz		4–6	Van Diemen	Honda
Shady Hill Clayworks	21	(United States) David Petzko	M	1–6; 10–15	Spectrum	Honda
Aiken Racing	21	(United States) Porter Aiken		16–18	Piper	Honda
Steelfiber	24	(United States) Christopher Horan		1–3	Van Diemen	Honda
ThursdayPools	27	(United States) Zachary Rivard		1–6	Van Diemen	Honda
Practical Precision Engineering	30	(United States) Will Velkoff		1–6; 10–15	Van Diemen	Honda
Morgan's Collision Center	31	(United States) Scott Rubenzer	M	1–6; 10–18	Spectrum	Honda
(United States) Pure Energy Racing	33	(United States) Jeffrey Bartz		4–6	Van Diemen	Honda
Aero Services Winchester	36	(United States) Steve Oseth	M	1–3; 10–15	Citation	Honda
Home Tech Bldg. Consultants	41	(United States) Robert Albani	M	1–3; 7–15	Mygale	Honda
Spectrum	47	(United States) Austin Kimberly		1–3; 13–18	Spectrum	Ford
	48	(United States) Peter Portante	G	4–6		
Creative Dynamics	57	(United States) Chris Smith	M	7–9	Van Diemen	Honda
Steel Services	72	(United States) Tom Schwietz	M	1–3; 7–12	Citation	Honda
Bell Helmets	73	(United States) Robert Perona	M	1–3	Piper	Honda
Primus	75	(United States) Jay Messenger	M	16–18	Van Diemen	Honda
Brumbaugh Racing	86	Kevin Brumbaugh	G	16–18	Van Diemen	Honda
Exclusive Autosport / lovation	91	(United States) Josh Pierson		1–3	Spectrum	Honda
Exclusive Autosport / lovation	92	(United States) Josh Pierson		13–15	Spectrum	Honda
(United States) Lee Racing	177	(United States) Jonathan Lee		16–18	Swift	Ford

Icon	Class
M	Masters
R	Rookie
G	Guest

== Schedule ==
Rd.	Date	Track	Location
1	June 19–21	Pittsburgh International Race Complex	Wampum, Pennsylvania
2	June 19–21	Pittsburgh International Race Complex	Wampum, Pennsylvania
3	June 19–21	Pittsburgh International Race Complex	Wampum, Pennsylvania
4	July 3–5	Mid-Ohio Sports Car Course	Lexington, Ohio
5	July 3–5	Mid-Ohio Sports Car Course	Lexington, Ohio
6	July 3–5	Mid-Ohio Sports Car Course	Lexington, Ohio
7	July 17–19	Virginia International Raceway	Alton, Virginia
8	July 17–19	Virginia International Raceway	Alton, Virginia
9	July 17–19	Virginia International Raceway	Alton, Virginia
10	August 21–23	Summit Point Motorsports Park	Summit Point, West Virginia
11	August 21–23	Summit Point Motorsports Park	Summit Point, West Virginia
12	August 21–23	Summit Point Motorsports Park	Summit Point, West Virginia
13	October 16–18	Pittsburgh International Race Complex	Wampum, Pennsylvania
14	October 16–18	Pittsburgh International Race Complex	Wampum, Pennsylvania
15	October 16–18	Pittsburgh International Race Complex	Wampum, Pennsylvania
16	October 30–31	Michelin Raceway Road Atlanta	Braselton, Georgia
17	October 30–31	Michelin Raceway Road Atlanta	Braselton, Georgia
18	October 30–31	Michelin Raceway Road Atlanta	Braselton, Georgia
Cancelled Events
–	~~31 Jul – 2 Aug~~	Barber Motorsports Park	Birmingham, Alabama
References: Formula Race Promotions Postpones May Event; Season Expected to Commence in June

== Results & performance summaries ==
Round	Circuit	Location	Date	Pole position	Fastest lap	Winning driver
1	Pittsburgh International Race Complex	Wampum, Pennsylvania	June 20	(United States) Simon Sikes	(United States) Simon Sikes	(United States) Simon Sikes
2	Pittsburgh International Race Complex	Wampum, Pennsylvania	June 21		(United States) Simon Sikes	(United States) Simon Sikes
3	Pittsburgh International Race Complex	Wampum, Pennsylvania	June 21		(United States) Dexter Czuba	(United States) Simon Sikes
4	Mid-Ohio Sports Car Course	Lexington, Ohio	July 5	(United States) Maxwell Esterson	(United States) Dylan Christie	(United States) Simon Sikes
5	Mid-Ohio Sports Car Course	Lexington, Ohio	July 5		(United States) Jackson Lee	(United States) Dexter Czuba
6	Mid-Ohio Sports Car Course	Lexington, Ohio	July 5		(United States) Jeffrey Bartz	(United States) Jackson Lee
7	Virginia International Raceway	Alton, Virginia	July 18	(United States) Maxwell Esterson	(United States) Joe Colasacco	(United States) Simon Sikes
8	Virginia International Raceway	Alton, Virginia	July 19		(United States) Dexter Czuba	(United States) Maxwell Esterson
9	Virginia International Raceway	Alton, Virginia	July 19		(United States) Maxwell Esterson	(United States) Jackson Lee
10	Summit Point Motorsports Park	Summit Point, West Virginia	August 22	(United States) Simon Sikes	(United States) Jackson Lee	(United States) Simon Sikes
11	Summit Point Motorsports Park	Summit Point, West Virginia	August 22		(United States) Burton August	(United States) Dylan Christie
12	Summit Point Motorsports Park	Summit Point, West Virginia	August 23		(United States) Maxwell Esterson	(United States) Dylan Christie
13	Pittsburgh International Race Complex	Wampum, Pennsylvania	October 17	(United States) Maxwell Esterson	(United States) Dylan Christie	(United States) Simon Sikes
14	Pittsburgh International Race Complex	Wampum, Pennsylvania	October 18		(United States) Maxwell Esterson	(United States) Dylan Christie
15	Pittsburgh International Race Complex	Wampum, Pennsylvania	October 18		(United States) Dexter Czuba	(United States) Simon Sikes
16	Michelin Raceway Road Atlanta	Braselton, Georgia	October 31	(United States) Simon Sikes	(United States) Dylan Christie	(United States) Dylan Christie
17	Michelin Raceway Road Atlanta	Braselton, Georgia	October 31		(United States) Simon Sikes	(United States) Simon Sikes
18	Michelin Raceway Road Atlanta	Braselton, Georgia	October 31		(United States) Jonathan Lee	(United States) Trey Burke

== Scoring System ==
Points are awarded to the top twentyfive classified drivers, and the top drivers who enables to achieve the Pole Position or the Fastest Lap during the qualify session are awarded with the corrispective bonus points +3 and +2 points.

The Season Championship will recognize only driver’s best 15 of 18 race results including all bonus points earned.

Points are awarded using the following system:

Position	1st	2nd	3rd	4th	5th	6th	7th	8th	9th	10th	11th	12th	13th	14th	15th	16th	17th	18th	19th	20th	21st	22nd	23rd	24th	25th+	DNF
Points	50	42	37	34	31	29	27	25	23	21	19	17	15	13	11	10	9	8	7	6	5	4	3	2	1	1

Guest drivers are ineligible to score points.

If a guest driver finishes in first position, the second-placed finisher will receive 50 points. The same goes for every other points scoring position. So if three guest drivers end up placed fourth, fifth and sixth, the seventh-placed finisher will receive thirtyfourth points and so forth - until the twentyeighth-placed finisher receives the final point.

== Driver Standings ==
Pos	Driver	PITT-1			MO			VIR			SP			PITT-2			RA			Pts	Drop Pts
1	(United States) Simon Sikes	**1**	1	1	1	2	DNS	1	6	6	**1**	2	2	1	10	1	**2**	1	2	**724**	689
2	(United States) Dylan Christie	2 (Note: Christie was found to be in violation of the PRR section 1.6.17.4 - Penalty: Loss of 10 Points & Purse.)	2	8	2	3	9	DNF	7	2	3	1	1	2	1	5	1	2	4	**648**	599
3	(United States) Dexter Czuba	6	5	5	3	1	3	3	3	4	4	6	5	4	3	10				515	515
4	(United States) Jackson Lee	12	8	6	5	4	1	2	2	1	2	3	3							440	440
5	(United States) Maxwell Esterson	4	4	3	**4**	5	2	**12**	1	3	17	5	4	**8**	14	DSQ				423	423
6	(United States) Scott Rubenzer	7	9	9	8	11	7				7	9	6	6	5	2	7	5	6	412	412
7	(United States) Bob Reid	11	13	18	10	13	12	8	13	11	16	15	14	10	7	12				253	253
8	(United States) Mike Scanlan	16	16	20				7	8	9	14	13	17	15	12	9	14	10	14	236	236
9	(United States) Omar Khan	21	20	19	13	15	14	10	12	12	DNF	16	16	14	9	8	12	11	12	**247**	235
10	(United States) Rob Albani	20	21	13				6	10	13	8	17	11	9	6	3				233	233
11	(United States) Ax Kametches	10	12	11	12	8	10										10	7	3	195	195
12	(United States) Steve Oseth	13	19	17				DNS	11	14	12	7	12	11	8	11				187	187
13	(United States) Christopher Horan	5	3	7	6	6	8													178	178
14	(United States) Dave Petzko	14	15	15	11	14	11				13	10	13	13	13	DNS				167	167
15	(United States) Trey Burke													5	4	13	6	3	1	166	166
16	(United States) Josh Pierson	17	6	4										3	2	DNF				152	152
17	(United States) Burton August				DNF	9	5				5	4	7							149	149
18	(United States) Joe Colasacco							5	5	5	10	12	18	DNS	DNS	DNS				141	141
19	(United States) Ryan Bjerke							4	4	10	11	18	9							139	139
20	(United States) Will Velkoff	15	14	16	DNS	Wth	Wth				15	14	15	12	11	7				132	132
21	(United States) Tom Schwietz	DNF	DNS	DNS				9	DNS	7	6	8	10							126	126
22	(United States) Jonathan Kotyk	3	7	2	DNS	Wth	Wth													106	106
23	Baylor Griffin																3	4	5	102	102
24	(United States) Jonathan Lee																5	6	7	89	89
25	(United States) Jeffrey Bartz				7	7	6													85	85
26	(United States) Christopher Kierce										9	11	8				DNF	DNS	13	83	83
27	(United States) Robert Dietz				9	10	4													78	78
28	(United States) Austin Kimberly	DNF	DNS	DNF										DNS	DNS	DNS	8	8	9	75	75
29	(United States) Porter Aiken																4	14	8	74	74
30	(United States) Jason Pribyl													7	16	4				71	71
31	(United States) Chris Smith							11	9	8										67	67
32	Bryson Morris																9	9	10	67	67
33	(United States) Zachary Rivard	9	11	10	DNS	Wth	Wth													63	63
34	(United States) Sam Lockwood	18	18	14	DNF	12	13													62	62
35	(United States) David Adorno																13	12	11	51	51
36	(United States) Glen Cordova													16	15	6				50	50
37	(United States) Robert Perona	8	10	DNF																47	47
38	(United States) Jey Messenger																11	15	DNS	32	32
39	(United States) John Dole	19	17	12 (Note: John Dole/M Car #4 Underweight - Penalty: Loss of Points & Purse)																16	16
Drivers ineligible for points
	Kevin Brumbaugh																15	13	DNF		
	(United States) Peter Portante				DNS	Wth	Wth														
Pos	Driver	PITT-1			MO			VIR			SP			PITT-2			RA			Pts	Drop Pts
References: FRP Official Points Standings & Results Archive F1600 & Race Monitor

Color	Result
Gold	Winner
Silver	2nd-place finish
Bronze	3rd-place finish
Green	Top 5 finish
Light Blue	Top 10 finish
Dark Blue	Other flagged position
Purple	Did not finish (DNF)
Brown	Withdrew (Wth)
Black	Disqualified (DSQ)
White	Did Not Start (DNS)
White	Race abandoned (C)
Blank	Did not participate

**In-line notation**
**Bold**	Pole position (3 points)
Italics	Fastest lap of the race (2 points)

Master of the Year
Masters

== Incident Reports ==
PIRC-1 — Penalty Report

== See also ==
- F1600 Championship Series
- 2020 F2000 Championship Series
