= 2027 IndyCar Series =

American auto racing season

2027 IndyCar season
- NTT IndyCar Series

Season
- Races: 17
- Start date: March 7
- End date: September 5

Awards
- Drivers' champion
- Manufacturers' Cup
- Rookie of the Year
- Indianapolis 500 winner

The 2027 NTT IndyCar Series is scheduled to be the 116th official championship season of American open-wheel racing and the 32nd season under IndyCar Series sanction. Its showcase event will be the 111th Running of the Indianapolis 500.

== Background and series news ==
- The 2027 season will be the final season for the Dallara DW12 chassis and its 2.2 liter V6 powertrains that was introduced in 2012, as a new Dallara-built chassis package and 2.4 liter V6 engine formula will be introduced in 2028.
- On April 28, 2026, IndyCar announced a new rule that non-chartered entries would not be permitted to race outside the Indianapolis 500 beginning with the 2027 season.

== Confirmed entries ==
The following teams, entries, and drivers are contracted to compete in the 2027 NTT IndyCar Series season. All teams use a spec-series Dallara DW12 chassis with 2018 universal aero kit and Firestone tires.

Team	Engine	No.	Driver(s)	Round(s)	Ref(s)
A. J. Foyt Enterprises (Note: Technical partnership with Team Penske.)	Chevrolet	4	(United States) Josh Pierson R	All	
A. J. Foyt Enterprises	Chevrolet	14	(Norway) Dennis Hauger	All	
Andretti Global	Honda	26	(Australia) Will Power	All	
Andretti Global	Honda	27	(United States) Kyle Kirkwood	All	
Andretti Global	Honda	28	(Sweden) Marcus Ericsson	All	
Arrow McLaren	Chevrolet	5	(Mexico) Pato O'Ward	All	
Arrow McLaren	Chevrolet	6	(New Zealand) Scott Dixon	All	
Arrow McLaren	Chevrolet	7	(Sweden) Felix Rosenqvist	All	
Arrow McLaren	Chevrolet	31	(United States) Ryan Hunter-Reay	7	
Chip Ganassi Racing	Honda	8	(Cayman Islands) Kyffin Simpson	All	
Chip Ganassi Racing	Honda	9	(Denmark) Christian Lundgaard	All	
Chip Ganassi Racing	Honda	10	(Spain) Álex Palou	All	
Dale Coyne Racing	Honda	18	TBA	All	
Dale Coyne Racing	Honda	19	(United States) Nikita Johnson R	All	
Dreyer & Reinbold Racing (Note: Technical partnership with Rahal Letterman Lanigan Racing.)	Honda	24	(United States) Conor Daly	All	
Ed Carpenter Racing	Chevrolet	20	(United States) Alexander Rossi	All	
Ed Carpenter Racing	Chevrolet	21	(Denmark) Christian Rasmussen	All	
Juncos Hollinger Racing	Chevrolet	76	TBA	All	
Juncos Hollinger Racing	Chevrolet	77	TBA	All	
Meyer Shank Racing (Note: Technical partnership with Chip Ganassi Racing.) with Curb-Agajanian	Honda	60	(New Zealand) Marcus Armstrong	All	
Meyer Shank Racing with Curb-Agajanian	Honda	66	(Germany) Mick Schumacher	All	
Rahal Letterman Lanigan Racing	Honda	15	(United States) Graham Rahal	All	
Rahal Letterman Lanigan Racing	Honda	45	(United Kingdom) Louis Foster	All	
Team Penske	Chevrolet	2	(United States) Josef Newgarden	All	
Team Penske	Chevrolet	3	(New Zealand) Scott McLaughlin	All	
Team Penske	Chevrolet	12	(United States) David Malukas	All	

Icon	Status
R	Eligible for Rookie of the Year
RY	Rookie of the Year

=== Driver changes ===
- On July 3, 2026, Meyer Shank Racing announced a multi-year contract extension for Marcus Armstrong that would see him move over to the No. 60 car previously piloted by reigning Indianapolis 500 winner Felix Rosenqvist.
- On July 6, 2026, Arrow McLaren confirmed reports that six-time series champion Scott Dixon would leave Chip Ganassi Racing after 23 years of working together and move over to McLaren, while Rosenqvist would also make his return to McLaren, having raced there from 2021 to 2023. That announcement meant that Christian Lundgaard and Nolan Siegel left the team after two and three seasons, respectively.
- On September 4, 2026, Meyer Shank Racing announced a multi-year contract for Mick Schumacher that would see him drive the No. 66 car previously driven by Armstrong.
- On September 5, 2026, Dreyer & Reinbold Racing announced the signing of Conor Daly on a multi-year deal, making his return to full time IndyCar competition after losing his seat at Juncos Hollinger Racing after 2025. He previously entered the Indianapolis 500 with Dreyer & Reinbold in 2024 and 2026.
- On September 16, 2026, A. J. Foyt Enterprises announced they had signed Dennis Hauger on a multi-year deal to drive car 14. Hauger had driven for Dale Coyne Racing during the 2026 season.
- On September 29, 2026, Chip Ganassi Racing announced the team had signed Christian Lundgaard on a multi-year deal to drive the No. 9 car vacated by Dixon, thereby effectively completing a driver swap between CGR and McLaren.
- On October 27, 2026, A. J. Foyt Enterprises announced that they had signed Josh Pierson to a multi-year deal to drive the No. 4 car vacated by Caio Collet. Pierson steps up to IndyCar after a four-year Indy NXT stint that yielded five podiums and an eleventh place in the standings in 2026.
- On November 10, 2026, Dale Coyne Racing announced that they had signed Nikita Johnson to drive the No. 19 car for the 2027 season. Johnson had won the Indy NXT championship in 2026.

=== Team changes ===
- On July 22, 2026, Dreyer & Reinbold Racing announced that they had acquired one of Rahal Letterman Lanigan Racing's three full-time charters, meaning the team would return to full-time IndyCar competition for the first time since the 2012 season. DRR's engine supply partner was later announced to be Honda, the first time two parties reunited since the 2011 season and thus ending the fifteen-year alliance with Chevrolet, while this development also meant that RLL would downsize to two full-time entries. In addition, Honda will provide equal full-factory and trackside support treatment for Dreyer & Reinbold Racing.

== Schedule ==
Icon	Legend
O	Oval/Speedway
R	Road course
S	Street circuit

Rd.	Date	Race name	Track	Location
1	March 7	Firestone Grand Prix of St. Petersburg	S Streets of St. Petersburg	St. Petersburg, Florida
2	March 13	Good Ranchers 250	O Phoenix Raceway	Avondale, Arizona
3	March 21	Java House Grand Prix of Arlington	S Streets of Arlington	Arlington, Texas
4	April 4	Children's of Alabama Indy Grand Prix	R Barber Motorsports Park	Birmingham, Alabama
5	April 18	Grand Prix of Long Beach	S Streets of Long Beach	Long Beach, California
6	May 15	Sonsio Grand Prix	R Indianapolis Motor Speedway Road Course	Speedway, Indiana
7	May 30	111th Running of the Indianapolis 500	O Indianapolis Motor Speedway	Speedway, Indiana
8	June 6	Chevrolet Detroit Grand Prix	S Streets of Detroit	Detroit, Michigan
9	June 13	Bommarito Automotive Group 500	O World Wide Technology Raceway	Madison, Illinois
10	June 27	XPEL Grand Prix at Road America	R Road America	Elkhart Lake, Wisconsin
11	July 4	Honda Indy 200 at Mid-Ohio	R Mid-Ohio Sports Car Course	Lexington, Ohio
12	July 18	IndyCar Grand Prix of Barcelona	R Circuit de Barcelona-Catalunya	Montmeló, Barcelona
13	August 1	OnlyBulls Grand Prix of Portland	R Portland International Raceway	Portland, Oregon
14	August 15	Ontario Honda Dealers Indy at Markham	S Streets of Markham	Markham, Ontario
15	August 28	Snap-on Milwaukee Mile double-header	O Milwaukee Mile	West Allis, Wisconsin
16	August 29	Snap-on Milwaukee Mile double-header	O Milwaukee Mile	West Allis, Wisconsin
17	September 5	IndyCar Grand Prix of Monterey	R WeatherTech Raceway Laguna Seca	Monterey, California

=== Schedule changes ===
- IndyCar will make its debut in Europe with a race at the Circuit de Barcelona-Catalunya, held on July 18. It will be the first top-level American open-wheel race to be held in Europe since the Bavaria Champ Car Grand Prix of the 2007 Champ Car World Series.
- Nashville Superspeedway, which had been on the calendar since 2024, as well as the Washington Street Circuit, which hosted a special one-off race in 2026, will not return for the 2027 season.

== Points standings ==
- Ties will be broken by number of wins, followed by number of 2nds, 3rds, etc.; then by finishing position in the previous race; then by random draw.

Position	1st	2nd	3rd	4th	5th	6th	7th	8th	9th	10th	11th	12th	13th	14th	15th	16th	17th	18th	19th	20th	21st	22nd	23rd	24th	25th+
Points	50	40	35	32	30	28	26	24	22	20	19	18	17	16	15	14	13	12	11	10	9	8	7	6	5

=== Driver standings ===
- At all races except the Indy 500, the pole position qualifier will earn 1 point (unless qualifying is not held). The twelve Indy 500 qualifiers who qualify for the fast 12 session will receive points based on the results of that session, descending from 12 points for first place.
- Drivers who lead at least one race lap will be awarded 1 point. The driver who leads the most laps during a race will score an additional 2 points.
- Each entrant-initiated engine change-out performed, prior to the engine having reached its distance mandate, will result in a loss of 10 championship points.

=== Engine manufacturer standings ===
The top-two finishing full-season eligible entrants for a manufacturer in each race will score points toward the engine manufacturer's championship. Points scored will be the same as the driver's championship except for bonus points – a race win will be worth five bonus points for a manufacturer, while a pole position will be worth one bonus point (except at the Indianapolis 500). A full-season entry will be eligible to score manufacturer points until it exceeds the maximum number of allowed engines per entry.

For Indianapolis 500 qualifying, the manufacturer that runs the fastest speed on Saturday will receive one bonus point; while the manufacturer that qualifies on pole position will receive two bonus points.

== See also ==
- 2027 Indy NXT
- 2027 USF Pro 2000 Championship
- 2027 USF2000 Championship
- 2027 USF Juniors
