= 2027 USF2000 Championship =

Racing season

The 2027 USF2000 Championship presented by Continental Tire is scheduled to be the eighteenth season of the USF2000 Championship since its revival in 2010. The championship serves as the second rung of the IndyCar Series's USF Pro Championships ladder system and is thereby placed three levels below IndyCar. The 2027 season will be held over 18 races across eight race weekends. It will start on March 5 around the Streets of St. Petersburg and end on October 3 at Road America.

== Drivers and teams ==
All drivers will compete using Tatuus USF-22 racecars with Elite Mazda 2.0-014A engines and Continental tires.

Team	No.	Driver(s)	Status	Round(s)
CSV Motorsport	TBA	TBA		TBC
Pabst Racing	24	(Canada) Lucas Nanji		All

Icon	Status
R	Rookie

=== Team changes ===
CSV Motorsport, an outfit co-founded by racing driver Zach Veach and GT racing team Czabok-Simpson Motorsport, will enter the championship as a new team.

=== Driver changes ===
Reigning Teams' Champions Pabst Racing promoted Eddie Beswick to their USF Pro 2000 outfit.

== Schedule ==
The 2027 schedule was revealed on October 29, 2026. The championship will visit two street circuits, five road courses and one oval. The second Road America event that was added in 2026 was not retained, with the series instead returning to WeatherTech Raceway Laguna Seca for the first time since 2019. All rounds except the weekend at Road America will be run in support of the IndyCar Series, with the Lucas Oil Indianapolis Raceway Park round also officially independent from the IndyCar Series, but run in support of the Dave Steele Classic and Hoosier Hundred events on the weekend of the Indianapolis 500.

Icon	Legend
O	Oval/Speedway
R	Road course
S	Street circuit

Rd.	Date	Race name	Track	Location
1	March 5–7	TBA	S Streets of St. Petersburg	St. Petersburg, Florida
2	March 5–7	TBA	S Streets of St. Petersburg	St. Petersburg, Florida
3	May 13–15	TBA	R Indianapolis Motor Speedway Road Course	Speedway, Indiana
4	May 13–15	TBA	R Indianapolis Motor Speedway Road Course	Speedway, Indiana
5	May 13–15	TBA	R Indianapolis Motor Speedway Road Course	Speedway, Indiana
6	May 27–28	TBA	O Lucas Oil Indianapolis Raceway Park	Brownsburg, Indiana
7	July 1–4	TBA	R Mid-Ohio Sports Car Course	Lexington, Ohio
8	July 1–4	TBA	R Mid-Ohio Sports Car Course	Lexington, Ohio
9	July 29—August 1	TBA	R Portland International Raceway	Portland, Oregon
10	July 29—August 1	TBA	R Portland International Raceway	Portland, Oregon
11	July 29—August 1	TBA	R Portland International Raceway	Portland, Oregon
12	August 13–15	TBA	S Streets of Markham	Markham, Ontario
13	August 13–15	TBA	S Streets of Markham	Markham, Ontario
14	September 2–5	TBA	R WeatherTech Raceway Laguna Seca	Monterey, California
15	September 2–5	TBA	R WeatherTech Raceway Laguna Seca	Monterey, California
16	September 30—October 3	TBA	R Road America	Elkhart Lake, Wisconsin
17	September 30—October 3	TBA	R Road America	Elkhart Lake, Wisconsin
18	September 30—October 3	TBA	R Road America	Elkhart Lake, Wisconsin

== Championship standings ==
=== Drivers' Championship ===
Scoring system

Position	1st	2nd	3rd	4th	5th	6th	7th	8th	9th	10th	11th	12th	13th	14th	15th	16th	17th	18th	19th	20th+
Points	30	25	22	19	17	15	14	13	12	11	10	9	8	7	6	5	4	3	2	1
Points (O)	45	38	33	29	26	23	21	20	18	17	15	14	12	11	9	8	6	5	3	2

- The driver who qualifies on pole will be awarded one additional point.
- One point will be awarded to the driver who led the most laps in a race.
- One point will be awarded to the driver who set the fastest lap during the race.

=== Teams' championship ===
Scoring system

Position	1st	2nd	3rd	4th	5th	6th	7th	8th	9th	10th+
Points	22	18	15	12	10	8	6	4	2	1

- Single car teams will receive 3 bonus points as an equivalency to multi-car teams.
- Only the best two results will be counted for teams fielding more than two entries.

== See also ==
- 2027 IndyCar Series
- 2027 Indy NXT
- 2027 USF Pro 2000 Championship
- 2027 USF Juniors
