= 2027 Indy NXT =

American motor racing season

2027 Indy NXT season
- Indy NXT by Firestone

Season
- Races: 15
- Start date: March 7
- End date: September 5

Awards

The 2027 Indy NXT by Firestone is scheduled to be the 41st season of Indy NXT by Firestone, the second-highest class of American open-wheel car racing, and the 25th season sanctioned by IndyCar. This will be the fifth year of the championship running under the Indy NXT moniker following its acquisition by Penske Entertainment, the owner of the IndyCar Series, in 2022.

== Teams and drivers ==
The following teams and drivers are contracted to compete in the 2027 Indy NXT by Firestone. All teams will compete with Dallara IL-15 chassis, inline four-cylinder engines developed by Advanced Engine Research, and tires supplied by Firestone.

Team	No.	Driver	Rounds
Abel Motorsports	32	(Netherlands) Niels Koolen	All
A. J. Foyt Racing (Note: Technical partnership with HMD ENVE Motorsports.)	4	(United Kingdom) Bart Harrison R	All
Cape Motorsports Powered by ECR	21	(United States) Bryce Aron	All
Chip Ganassi Racing	10	(Argentina) Alessandro de Tullio	All
Chip Ganassi Racing	11	(United States) Carson Etter	All
HMD | ENVE Motorsports	55	(Brazil) Leonardo Escorpioni R	All

Key
Symbol	Meaning
R	Eligible for Rookie of the Year

=== Team changes ===
- On November 16, 2026, PV3 Enterprises, the parent company of racing team ENVE Motorsports, announced it had acquired the HMD Motorsports operation, with the team running as HMD | ENVE Motorsports from the 2027 season.

=== Driver changes ===
- On October 13, 2026, Abel Motorsports announced that Niels Koolen would move over to the team's No. 32 car for his third Indy NXT season after coming 15th in 2026 driving for Chip Ganassi Racing.
- On October 22, 2026, A. J. Foyt Racing announced the signing of Bart Harrison, who would make his full-time series debut piloting the No. 4 car after three race outings in 2026 with HMD Motorsports that yielded one top-ten result.
- On October 27, 2026, HMD Motorsports announced that 2026 USF Pro 2000 runner-up Leonardo Escorpioni would graduate to Indy NXT and drive the team's No. 55 entry in 2027.
- On November 2, 2026, Cape Motorsports Powered by ECR announced that Bryce Aron would drive the No. 21 entry previously piloted by reigning champion Nikita Johnson. Aron joins the team for his fourth Indy NXT campaign after finishing 14th in 2026 driving for Chip Ganassi Racing.
- On November 11, 2026, Chip Ganassi Racing announced Alessandro de Tullio would join the team in the No. 10 car previously driven by Koolen, moving over from A. J. Foyt Racing after coming sixth in 2026.

== Schedule ==
The 2027 Indy NXT by Firestone schedule was unveiled by IndyCar on November 13, 2026. A total of 15 races were included, two fewer than in 2026.

Icon	Legend
O	Oval/Speedway
R	Road course
S	Street circuit

Round	Date	Race	Track	Location
1	March 7	Grand Prix of St. Petersburg	S St. Petersburg Street Circuit	St. Petersburg, Florida
2	March 21	Grand Prix of Arlington	S Arlington Street Circuit	Arlington, Texas
3	April 3	Grand Prix of Alabama	R Barber Motorsports Park	Birmingham, Alabama
4	April 4	Grand Prix of Alabama	R Barber Motorsports Park	Birmingham, Alabama
5	May 15	Grand Prix of Indianapolis	R Indianapolis Motor Speedway Road Course	Speedway, Indiana
6	June 6	Detroit Grand Prix	S Detroit Street Circuit	Detroit, Michigan
7	June 13	World Wide Technology Raceway	O World Wide Technology Raceway	Madison, Illinois
8	June 26	Grand Prix at Road America	R Road America	Elkhart Lake, Wisconsin
9	June 27	Grand Prix at Road America	R Road America	Elkhart Lake, Wisconsin
10	July 3	Grand Prix at Mid-Ohio	R Mid-Ohio Sports Car Course	Lexington, Ohio
11	July 4	Grand Prix at Mid-Ohio	R Mid-Ohio Sports Car Course	Lexington, Ohio
12	July 31	Grand Prix of Portland	R Portland International Raceway	Portland, Oregon
13	August 28	Milwaukee Mile	O Milwaukee Mile	West Allis, Wisconsin
14	September 4	Grand Prix of Monterey	R WeatherTech Raceway Laguna Seca	Monterey, California
15	September 5	Grand Prix of Monterey	R WeatherTech Raceway Laguna Seca	Monterey, California

=== Schedule changes ===
Two races were dropped from the schedule: Indy NXT will only hold one race at the Indianapolis Motor Speedway Road Course, which previously held a double-header event, and will not return to Nashville Superspeedway as IndyCar will also not race there in 2027.

== Championship standings ==
Scoring system

Position	1st	2nd	3rd	4th	5th	6th	7th	8th	9th	10th	11th	12th	13th	14th	15th	16th	17th	18th	19th	20th	21st	22nd	23rd	24th
Points	50	40	35	32	30	28	26	24	22	20	19	18	17	16	15	14	13	12	11	10	9	8	7	6

- The fastest driver in each qualifying session will be awarded one additional point.
- Every driver who led at least one lap will be awarded a bonus point, the driver who led the most laps will receive two points.

Entrants will score points in the same way drivers scored points, including bonus points for pole position and laps led.

== See also ==
- 2027 IndyCar Series
- 2027 USF Pro 2000 Championship
- 2027 USF2000 Championship
- 2027 USF Juniors
