= 2027 USF Pro 2000 Championship =

Racing season

The 2027 USF Pro 2000 Championship presented by Continental Tire is scheduled to be the 29th season of the junior series two levels below the IndyCar series. It will be the fifth season under the USF Pro 2000 moniker after the championship's most recent rebrand in 2023. The championship serves as the upper rung of the IndyCar Series's USF Pro Championships ladder system. The season will be held over 18 races across nine race weekends. It will start on March 5 around the Streets of St. Petersburg and end on October 3 at Road America.

== Drivers and teams ==
All drivers will compete using Tatuus IP-22 racecars with Elite Mazda 2.0-014A engines and Continental tires. This will be the final year for that chassis and engine package, as a new Tatuus APT-28 chassis and a new Honda engine will be introduced in 2028.

Team	No.	Driver(s)	Status	Round(s)
JHDD powered by ECR	7	(United States) JT Hoskins		All
Pabst Racing	20	(Australia) Eddie Beswick	R	All

Icon	Status
R	Rookie

=== Driver changes ===
Pabst Racing promoted Eddie Beswick from their USF2000 outfit after he finished the 2026 season in third.

== Schedule ==
The 2027 schedule was revealed on October 29, 2026. The championship will visit two street circuits, four road courses and two ovals. USF Pro 2000 will return to the Streets of St. Petersburg as its season opener after not racing there in 2026, while the Streets of Arlington were not included in the schedule after their debut in 2026. All rounds except the second weekend at Road America will be run in support of the IndyCar Series, with the Lucas Oil Indianapolis Raceway Park round also officially independent from the IndyCar Series, but run in support of the Dave Steele Classic and Hoosier Hundred events on the weekend of the Indianapolis 500.

Icon	Legend
O	Oval/Speedway
R	Road course
S	Street circuit

Rd.	Date	Race name	Track	Location
1	March 5–7	TBA	S Streets of St. Petersburg	St. Petersburg, Florida
2	March 5–7	TBA	S Streets of St. Petersburg	St. Petersburg, Florida
3	May 13–15	TBA	R Indianapolis Motor Speedway Road Course	Speedway, Indiana
4	May 13–15	TBA	R Indianapolis Motor Speedway Road Course	Speedway, Indiana
5	May 27–28	TBA	O Lucas Oil Indianapolis Raceway Park	Brownsburg, Indiana
6	June 24–27	TBA	R Road America	Elkhart Lake, Wisconsin
7	June 24–27	TBA	R Road America	Elkhart Lake, Wisconsin
8	July 1–4	TBA	R Mid-Ohio Sports Car Course	Lexington, Ohio
9	July 1–4	TBA	R Mid-Ohio Sports Car Course	Lexington, Ohio
10	July 1–4	TBA	R Mid-Ohio Sports Car Course	Lexington, Ohio
11	July 29—August 1	TBA	R Portland International Raceway	Portland, Oregon
12	July 29—August 1	TBA	R Portland International Raceway	Portland, Oregon
13	August 13–15	TBA	S Streets of Markham	Markham, Ontario
14	August 13–15	TBA	S Streets of Markham	Markham, Ontario
15	August 27–28	TBA	O Milwaukee Mile	West Allis, Wisconsin
16	September 30—October 3	TBA	R Road America	Elkhart Lake, Wisconsin
17	September 30—October 3	TBA	R Road America	Elkhart Lake, Wisconsin
18	September 30—October 3	TBA	R Road America	Elkhart Lake, Wisconsin

== Championship standings ==
=== Drivers' Championship ===
Scoring system

Position	1st	2nd	3rd	4th	5th	6th	7th	8th	9th	10th	11th	12th	13th	14th	15th	16th	17th	18th	19th	20th+
Points	30	25	22	19	17	15	14	13	12	11	10	9	8	7	6	5	4	3	2	1
Points (O)	45	38	33	29	26	23	21	20	18	17	15	14	12	11	9	8	6	5	3	2

- The driver who qualifies on pole will be awarded one additional point.
- One point will be awarded to the driver who led the most laps in a race.
- One point will be awarded to the driver who set the fastest lap during the race.

=== Teams' championship ===
Scoring system

Position	1st	2nd	3rd	4th	5th	6th	7th	8th	9th	10th+
Points	22	18	15	12	10	8	6	4	2	1

- Single car teams will receive 3 bonus points as an equivalency to multi-car teams.
- Only the best two results will count for teams fielding more than two entries.

== See also ==
- 2027 IndyCar Series
- 2027 Indy NXT
- 2027 USF2000 Championship
- 2027 USF Juniors
