= Freedom 250 Grand Prix =

IndyCar race held in Washington, D.C.

(United States) 2026 Freedom 250 Grand Prix of Washington, D.C.
Race details
15th round of the 2026 IndyCar season
← Previous race	Next race →
- Layout of the circuit
- Date: August 23, 2026
- Official name: Freedom 250 Grand Prix of Washington, D.C.
- Location: Washington Street Circuit, Washington, D.C.
- Course: Temporary street circuit 1.700 mi / 2.736 km
- Distance: 147 (Note: The race was originally scheduled to be 125 laps (212.5 mi, 341.986 km), before being extended to 147 laps (250 mi, 402.336 km)) laps 250 mi / 402.336 km

Pole position
- Driver: (Spain) Álex Palou (Chip Ganassi Racing)
- Time: 56.8993

Fastest lap
- Driver: (Australia) Will Power (Andretti Global)
- Time: 0:57.9495 (on lap 122 of 147 (Note: The race was originally scheduled to be 125 laps (212.5 mi, 341.986 km), before being extended to 147 laps (250 mi, 402.336 km)))

Podium
- First: (United States) Kyle Kirkwood (Andretti Global)
- Second: (Denmark) Christian Lundgaard (Arrow McLaren)
- Third: (Australia) Will Power (Andretti Global)

The Freedom 250 Grand Prix of Washington D.C. was an NTT IndyCar Series motor race held on August 23, 2026, at the 1.7 mi (2.7 km) Washington Street Circuit in Washington, D.C. It was the fifteenth round of the 2026 NTT IndyCar Series. The race consisted of 147 laps, extended from the originally scheduled 125 laps.

Kyle Kirkwood won the race, followed by Christian Lundgaard and Will Power on the podium.

== Background ==
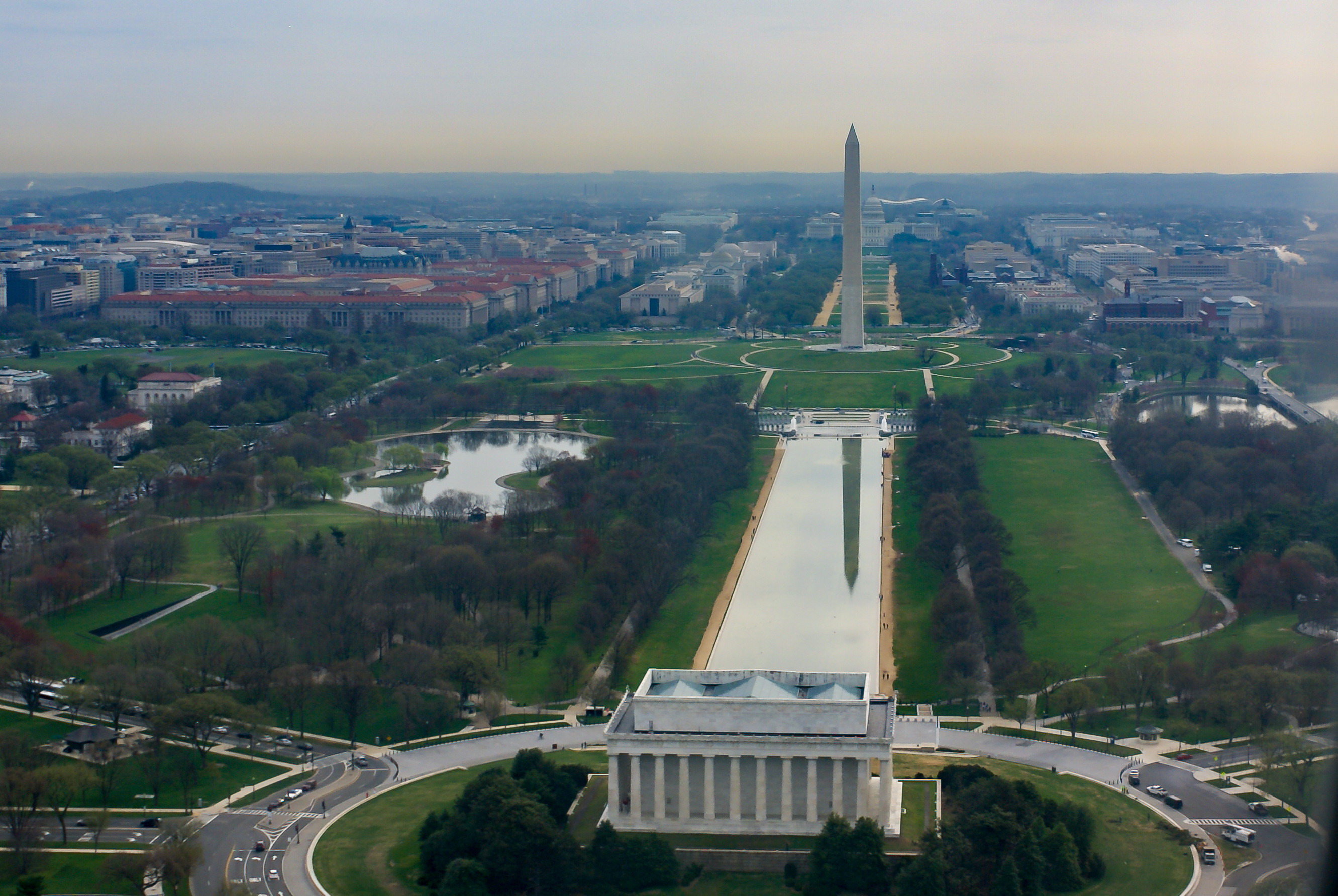
The National Mall, the area where the race was held. The Lincoln Memorial and its reflecting pool, the Washington Monument behind it, and the United States Capitol in the background

On January 23, 2026, months after the NTT IndyCar Series' 2026 schedule was released, United States President Donald Trump posted an AI-generated video of a proposed 'D.C. Grand Prix' motor race to Truth Social as part of the Department of Transportation's push to host an IndyCar Series race on the streets of Washington, D.C. for the United States Semiquincentennial. The race was officially announced on January 30, with Trump signing an executive order authorizing the race. It was the first major motor race to be held at Washington, D.C. since the 2002 Grand Prix of Washington D.C. American Le Mans Series race and the second event held in proximity to the White House along with the UFC Freedom 250. The order instructed the Secretary of the Interior and the Secretary of Transportation to design the course layout within fourteen days and to "ensure that all permits, approvals, and other authorizations ... are issued and granted as expeditiously as possible".

The executive order also instructed the two Secretaries, in coordination with Washington, D.C. mayor Muriel Bowser, to "ensure that any roads, trails, or bridges to be used as part of the race course are properly maintained and capable of being used in such a manner". More than 200 manholes were welded down because they may have otherwise been road hazards. The street circuit was composed around the National Mall.

=== Race promotion ===
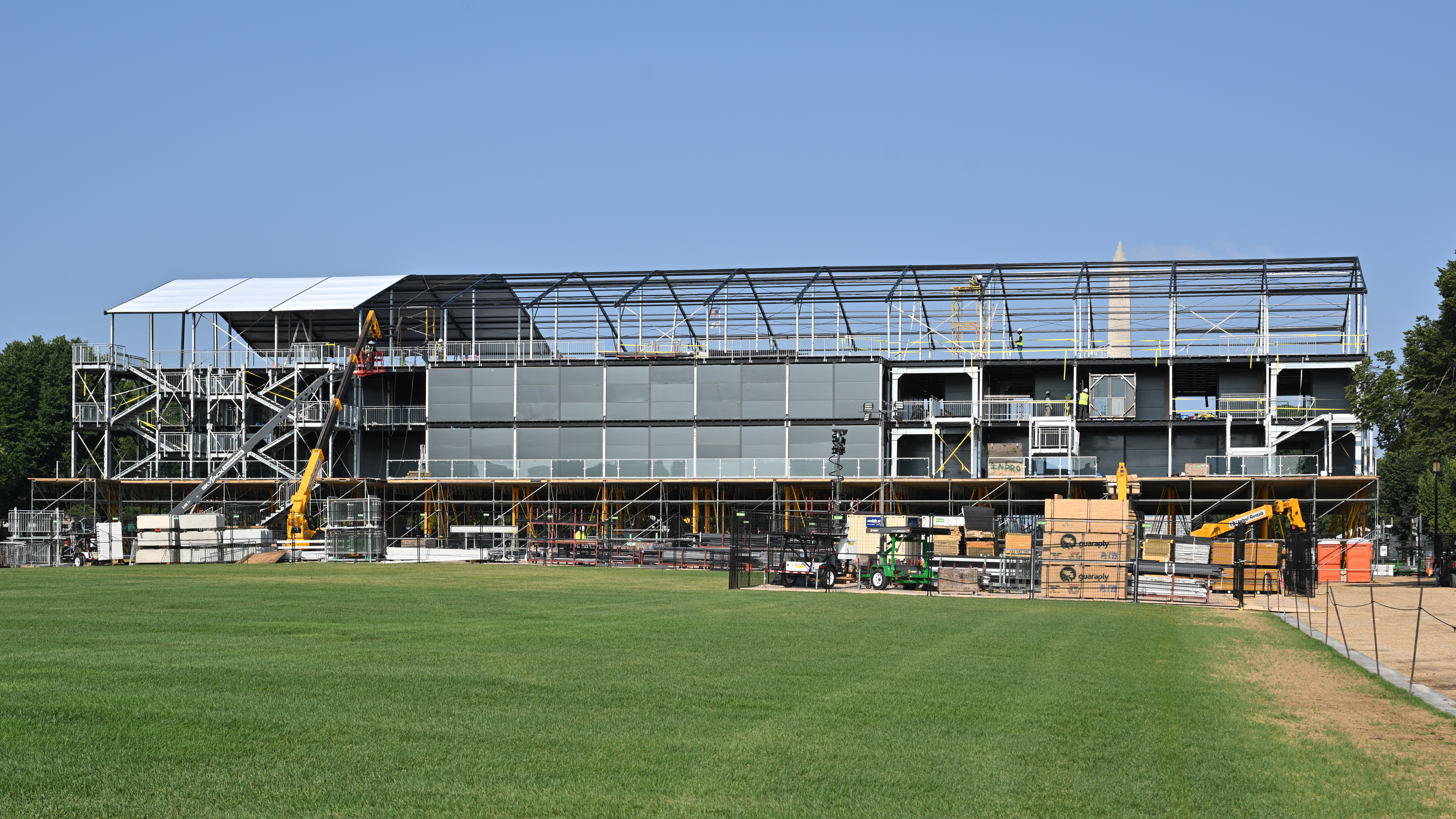
Grandstands being built near 7th Street.

In February 2026, IndyCar (the NTT IndyCar Series' governing body) announced a partnership with Monumental Sports & Entertainment to support the promotion and commercial development of the race. Under the agreement, Monumental was appointed as the event’s official agency for marketing, sponsorship sales, and corporate hospitality. Its role includes securing commercial partners and coordinating hospitality activities associated with the race weekend. IndyCar stated that the collaboration was intended to draw on Monumental’s experience in hosting large-scale sporting and entertainment events in the Washington metropolitan area.

In May 2026, IndyCar launched an officially licensed T-shirt with the slogan "One Nation, One Race" around an IndyCar Series driver posed in a manner similar to the Lincoln Memorial. In an email to The Athletic, IndyCar said: "A shirt was removed from IndyCar’s online store following feedback from customers. We understand that some individuals found its phrasing concerning and therefore have remedied the situation." Reuters summarized the internet backlash as "fans objected to language they said could be interpreted as white-supremacist"

=== Freedom 250 Grand Prix showcase ===
On July 13, President Donald Trump invited drivers (David Malukas, Álex Palou and Felix Rosenqvist) and personnel (including Roger Penske) to the White House for the Freedom 250 Grand Prix showcase. Malukas and his Team Penske crew performed a pit stop demonstration in front of the West Wing.

== Entry list ==
The entry list includes the 25 chartered, full-time IndyCar Series entries. There were no part-time or "one-off" entries. All entries used a spec Dallara DW12 chassis with the UAK-18 universal aero kit and the 2020-adopted aeroscreen. Honda (HRC US) and Chevrolet (Ilmor) are the engine providers. Firestone is the exclusive tire supplier. This is the third season of hybrid energy recovery system powertrains in IndyCar.

Going into the race, Álex Palou led the 2026 IndyCar Series points championship, with a 133-point lead over Kyle Kirkwood. Palou led the drivers this season with six victories and six pole positions before the race Josef Newgarden and Christian Lundgaard had two wins each going into the race. Kyle Kirkwood, Pato O'Ward, Marcus Ericsson, and Indy 500 winner Felix Rosenqvist each had one win.

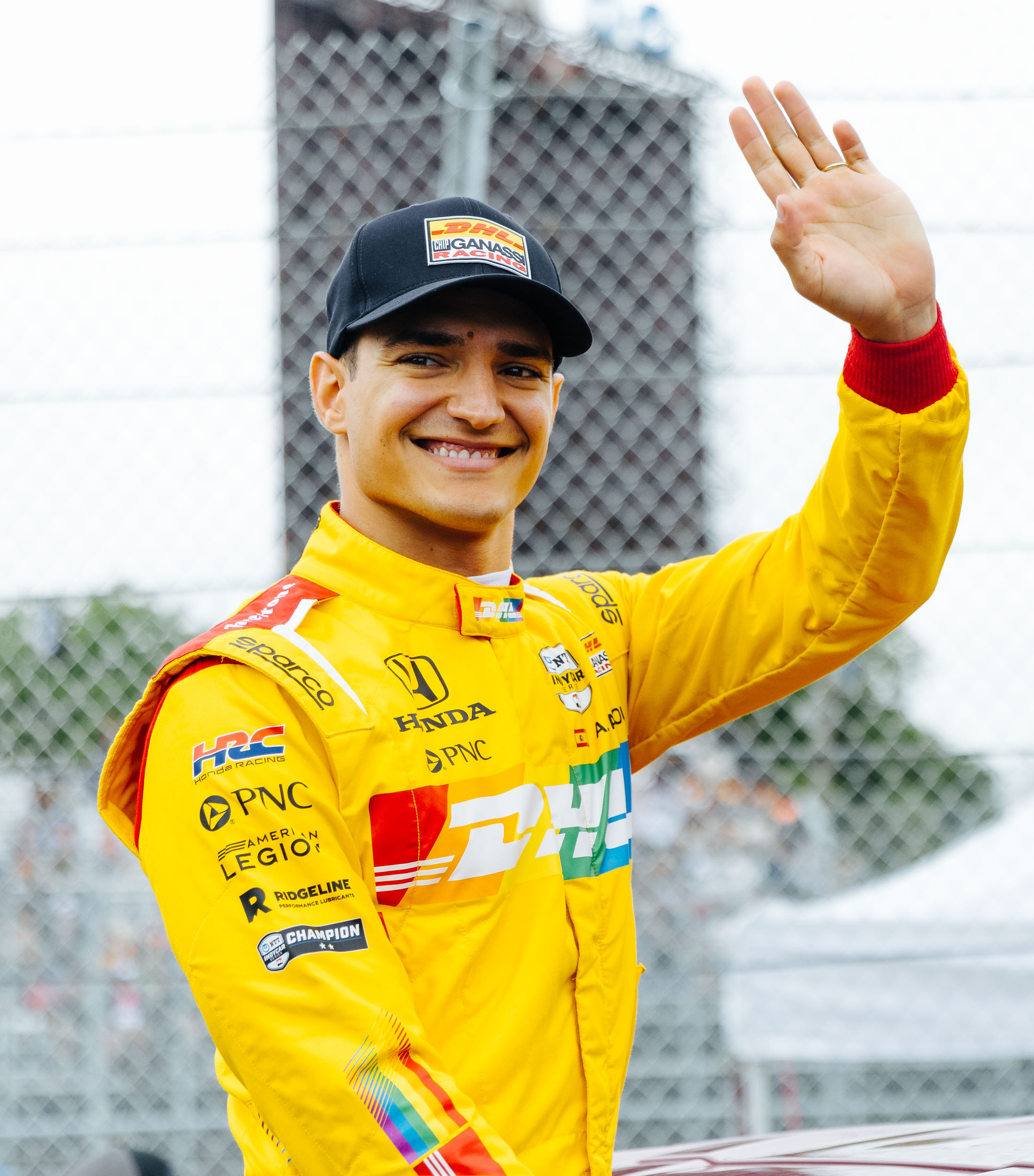
Four-time IndyCar Series champion Álex Palou (pictured in 2024) led the points standings entering the Freedom 250 Grand Prix.

No.	Driver	Team	Engine
2	(United States) Josef Newgarden	Team Penske	Chevrolet
3	(New Zealand) Scott McLaughlin	Team Penske	Chevrolet
4	(Brazil) Caio Collet R	A.J. Foyt Racing	Chevrolet
5	(Mexico) Pato O'Ward	Arrow McLaren	Chevrolet
6	(United States) Nolan Siegel	Arrow McLaren	Chevrolet
7	(Denmark) Christian Lundgaard	Arrow McLaren	Chevrolet
8	(Cayman Islands) Kyffin Simpson	Chip Ganassi Racing	Honda
9	(New Zealand) Scott Dixon	Chip Ganassi Racing	Honda
10	(Spain) Álex Palou	Chip Ganassi Racing	Honda
12	(United States) David Malukas	Team Penske	Chevrolet
14	(United States) Santino Ferrucci	A.J. Foyt Racing	Chevrolet
15	(United States) Graham Rahal	Rahal Letterman Lanigan Racing	Honda
18	(France) Romain Grosjean	Dale Coyne Racing	Honda
19	(Norway) Dennis Hauger R	Dale Coyne Racing	Honda
20	(United States) Alexander Rossi	ECR	Chevrolet
21	(Denmark) Christian Rasmussen	ECR	Chevrolet
26	(Australia) Will Power	Andretti Global	Honda
27	(United States) Kyle Kirkwood	Andretti Global with Curb-Agajanian	Honda
28	(Sweden) Marcus Ericsson	Andretti Global	Honda
45	(United Kingdom) Louis Foster	Rahal Letterman Lanigan Racing	Honda
47	(Germany) Mick Schumacher R	Rahal Letterman Lanigan Racing	Honda
60	(Sweden) Felix Rosenqvist	Meyer Shank Racing with Curb-Agajanian	Honda
66	(New Zealand) Marcus Armstrong	Meyer Shank Racing with Curb-Agajanian	Honda
76	(Netherlands) Rinus VeeKay	Juncos Hollinger Racing	Chevrolet
77	(United States) Sting Ray Robb	Juncos Hollinger Racing	Chevrolet
OFFICIAL REPORT

- R IndyCar Series rookie

== Practice and qualifying ==
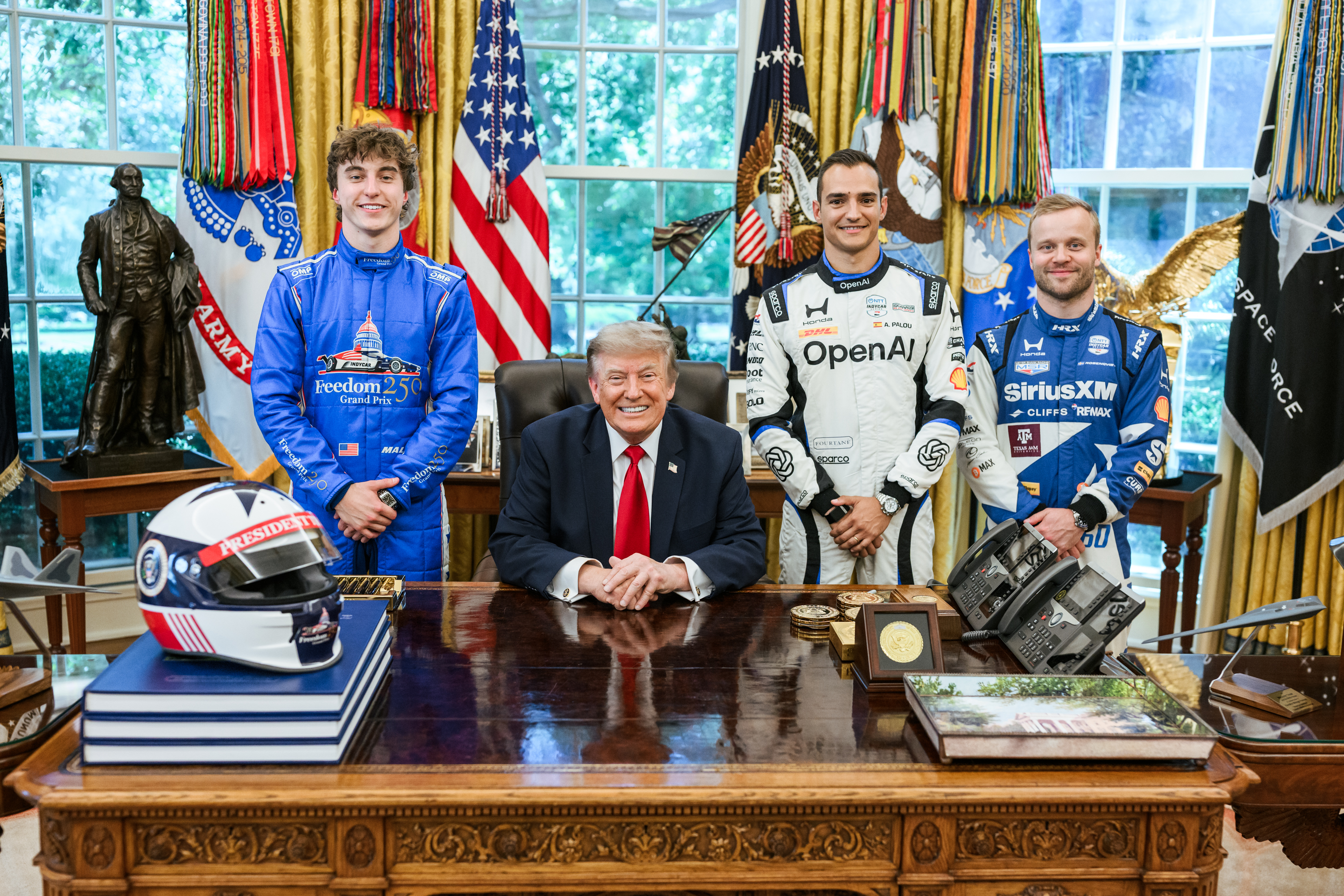
President Donald Trump (center) with three drivers involved in the race; from left to right: David Malukas, Álex Palou and Felix Rosenqvist

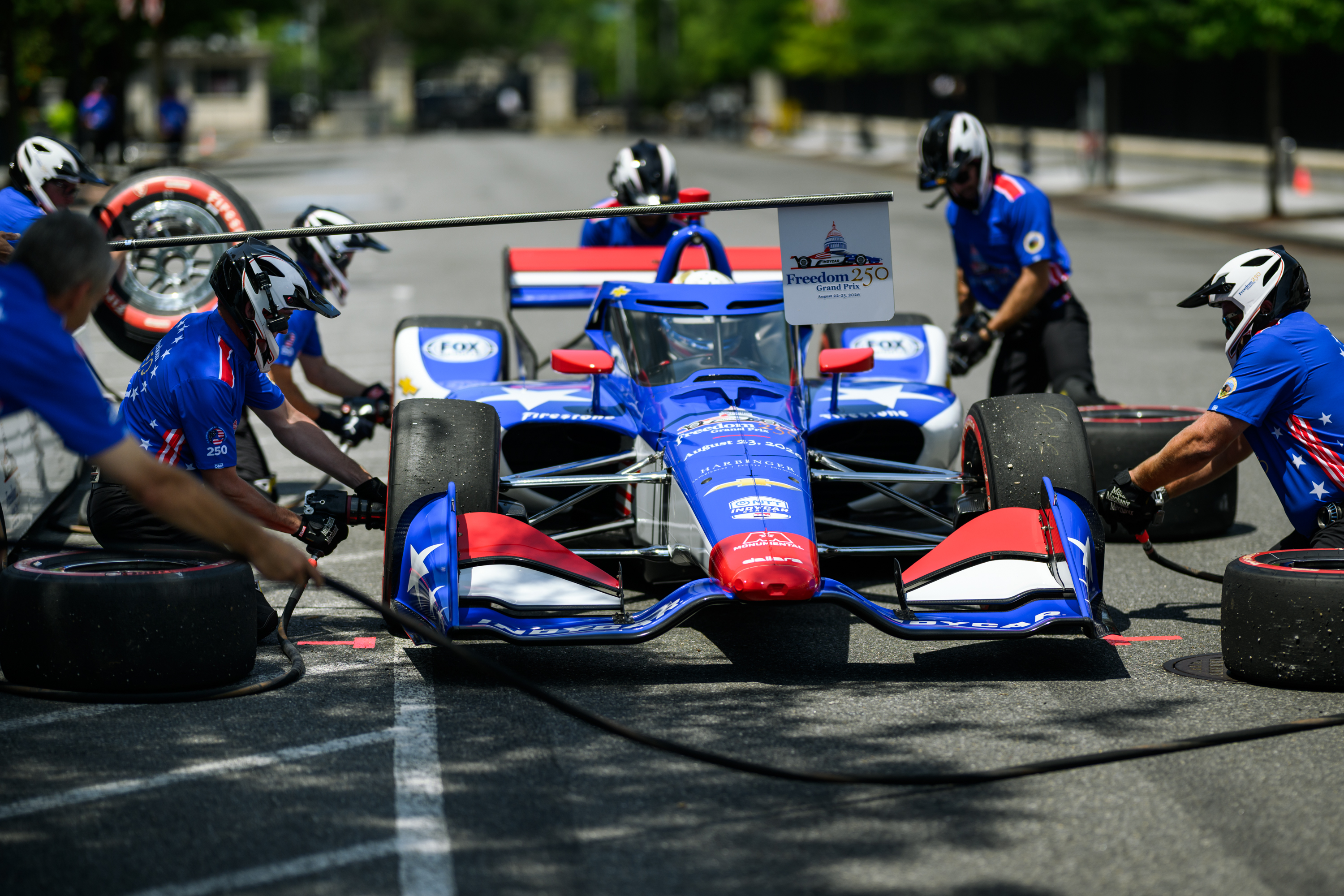
A pit stop being done by the West Wing.

=== Practice 1 ===
The first practice session was held Saturday August 22, beginning at 9:00 a.m. ET. The session was divided into three groups. Due to overnight rain, the first session was declared "wet", with cars utilizing rain tires. Christian Lundgaard, Will Power, and Christian Rasmussen, all made light clipping contact with walls, but no major incidents were reported. About 25 minutes into the session, the track surface had dried sufficiently, and competitors switched to slick tires.

Top Practice Speeds
Pos	No.	Driver	Team	Engine	Lap Time
1	27	(United States) Kyle Kirkwood	Andretti Global with Curb-Agajanian	Honda	57.3744
2	10	(Spain) Álex Palou	Chip Ganassi Racing	Honda	57.6123
3	19	(Norway) Dennis Hauger R	Dale Coyne Racing	Honda	57.7381
OFFICIAL REPORT

=== Practice 2 ===
The second and final practice session was held Saturday August 22, 2026 at 1:00 p.m. ET. Álex Palou posted the fastest lap of the day, with an unofficial track record of 56.6145 seconds. Graham Rahal and Louis Foster, both of Rahal Letterman Lanigan Racing, suffered damage after hitting bumps approaching turn 6, and subsequently making contact with the concrete wall. No injuries were reported.

Top Practice Speeds
Pos	No.	Driver	Team	Engine	Lap Time
1	10	(Spain) Álex Palou	Chip Ganassi Racing	Honda	56.6145
2	27	(United States) Kyle Kirkwood	Andretti Global with Curb-Agajanian	Honda	56.6911
3	9	(New Zealand) Scott Dixon	Chip Ganassi Racing	Honda	56.8180
OFFICIAL REPORT

=== Qualifying ===
The qualifying session was held on Saturday August 22 at 5:00 p.m. ET. Álex Palou won his seventh pole position of the season.

Classification
Pos	No.	Driver	Team	Engine	Time	Final grid
1	10	(Spain) Álex Palou	Chip Ganassi Racing	Honda	56.8993	1
2	27	(United States) Kyle Kirkwood	Andretti Global with Curb-Agajanian	Honda	57.4661	2
3	3	(New Zealand) Scott McLaughlin	Team Penske	Chevrolet	57.6200	3
4	21	(Denmark) Christian Rasmussen	ECR	Chevrolet	57.8892	4
5	66	(New Zealand) Marcus Armstrong	Meyer Shank Racing with Curb-Agajanian	Honda	58.8145	5
6	12	(United States) David Malukas	Team Penske	Chevrolet	1:10.6709	6
7	5	(Mexico) Pato O'Ward	Arrow McLaren	Chevrolet	57.3064	7
8	19	(Norway) Dennis Hauger R	Dale Coyne Racing	Honda	57.4202	8
9	7	(Denmark) Christian Lundgaard	Arrow McLaren	Chevrolet	57.4420	9
10	60	(Sweden) Felix Rosenqvist	Meyer Shank Racing with Curb-Agajanian	Honda	57.5120	10
11	4	(Brazil) Caio Collet R	A.J. Foyt Racing	Chevrolet	57.7407	11
12	6	(United States) Nolan Siegel	Arrow McLaren	Chevrolet	58.0701	17
13	26	(Australia) Will Power	Andretti Global	Honda	57.0916	12
14	9	(New Zealand) Scott Dixon	Chip Ganassi Racing	Honda	57.5785	13
15	28	(Sweden) Marcus Ericsson	Andretti Global	Honda	57.2799	20
16	2	(United States) Josef Newgarden	Team Penske	Chevrolet	57.6329	14
17	20	(United States) Alexander Rossi	ECR	Chevrolet	57.4793	15
18	45	(United Kingdom) Louis Foster	Rahal Letterman Lanigan Racing	Honda	57.7457	16
19	76	(Netherlands) Rinus VeeKay	Juncos Hollinger Racing	Chevrolet	57.4946	21
20	47	(Germany) Mick Schumacher R	Rahal Letterman Lanigan Racing	Honda	57.8405	24
21	18	(France) Romain Grosjean	Dale Coyne Racing	Honda	57.5080	18
22	14	(United States) Santino Ferrucci	A.J. Foyt Racing	Chevrolet	57.9615	25
23	15	(United States) Graham Rahal	Rahal Letterman Lanigan Racing	Honda	57.8697	19
24	77	(United States) Sting Ray Robb	Juncos Hollinger Racing	Chevrolet	58.4827	22
25	8	(Cayman Islands) Kyffin Simpson	Chip Ganassi Racing	Honda	59.1654	23
OFFICIAL REPORT

=== Warmup ===
The warmup session was held Sunday August 23, at 9:15 a.m. ET. Overnight, track crews attempted to grind down bumps along the straightaway leading into turn six. All 25 cars took laps, with Josef Newgarden setting the fastest lap. No incidents were reported.

Top Practice Speeds
Pos	No.	Driver	Team	Engine	Lap Time
1	2	(United States) Josef Newgarden	Team Penske	Chevrolet	57.6076
2	10	(Spain) Álex Palou	Chip Ganassi Racing	Honda	57.6858
3	12	(United States) David Malukas	Team Penske	Chevrolet	57.8364
OFFICIAL REPORT

== Race ==
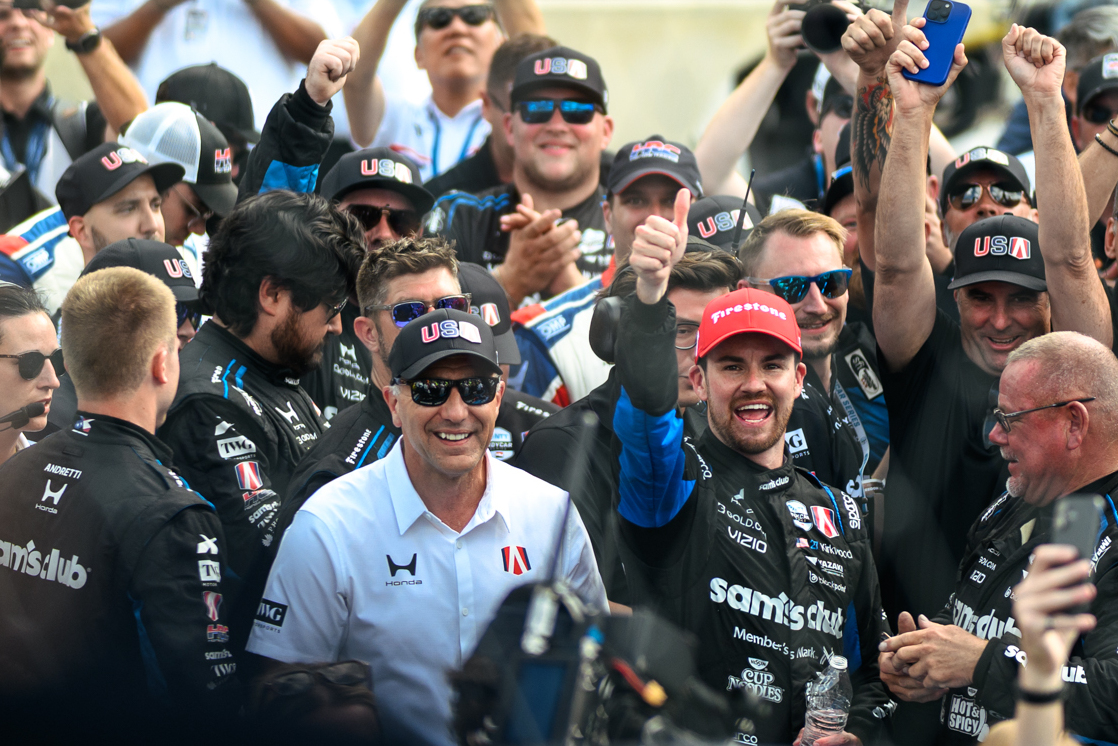
Kyle Kirkwood (second-right) and his Andretti Global team celebrating in victory lane.

The race was held on Sunday, August 23, 2026, at 1:00 PM ET.

Classification
Pos	No.	Driver	Team	Engine	Laps	Time/Retired	Pit Stops	Grid	Laps Led	Pts.
1	27	(United States) Kyle Kirkwood	Andretti Global	Honda	147	2:40:42.9548	3	2	128	53
2	7	(Denmark) Christian Lundgaard	Arrow McLaren	Chevrolet	147	+3.0906	3	9		40
3	26	(Australia) Will Power	Andretti Global	Honda	147	+4.1842	3	13	4	36
4	28	(Sweden) Marcus Ericsson	Andretti Global	Honda	147	+12.4637	3	21		32
5	8	(Cayman Islands) Kyffin Simpson	Chip Ganassi Racing	Honda	147	+13.8628	4	23		30
6	6	(United States) Nolan Siegel	Arrow McLaren	Chevrolet	147	+15.6513	3	18		28
7	9	(New Zealand) Scott Dixon	Chip Ganassi Racing	Honda	147	+18.5866	3	13		26
8	2	(United States) Josef Newgarden	Team Penske	Chevrolet	147	+19.4761	3	14		24
9	4	(Brazil) Caio Collet R	A.J. Foyt Enterprises	Chevrolet	147	+20.1903	3	11		22
10	18	(France) Romain Grosjean	Dale Coyne Racing	Honda	147	+22.2182	4	19		20
11	47	(Germany) Mick Schumacher R	Rahal Letterman Lanigan Racing	Honda	147	+26.6443	4	24		19
12	20	(United States) Alexander Rossi	ECR	Chevrolet	147	+30.9341	4	15		18
13	15	(United States) Graham Rahal	Rahal Letterman Lanigan Racing	Honda	147	+32.0496	6	20	12	18
14	21	(Denmark) Christian Rasmussen	ECR	Chevrolet	146	+1 Lap	12	4		16
15	19	(Norway) Dennis Hauger R	Dale Coyne Racing	Honda	146	+1 Lap	3	8		15
16	5	(Mexico) Pato O'Ward	Arrow McLaren	Chevrolet	146	+1 Lap	8	7		14
17	66	(New Zealand) Marcus Armstrong	Meyer Shank Racing with Curb-Agajanian	Honda	146	+1 Lap	4	5		13
18	45	(United Kingdom) Louis Foster	Rahal Letterman Lanigan Racing	Honda	146	+1 Lap	4	16		12
19	60	(Sweden) Felix Rosenqvist	Meyer Shank Racing with Curb-Agajanian	Honda	146	+1 Lap	5	10		11
20	10	(Spain) Álex Palou	Chip Ganassi Racing	Honda	144	+3 Laps	5	1		11
21	14	(United States) Santino Ferrucci	A.J. Foyt Enterprises	Chevrolet	132	Retired	6	25		9
22	3	(New Zealand) Scott McLaughlin	Team Penske	Chevrolet	128	Contact	3	3	3	9
23	76	(Netherlands) Rinus VeeKay	Juncos Hollinger Racing	Chevrolet	43	Contact	1	19		7
24	12	(United States) David Malukas	Team Penske	Chevrolet	35	Contact	1	6		6
25	77	(United States) Sting Ray Robb	Juncos Hollinger Racing	Chevrolet	35	Contact	1	24		5
Fastest lap: (Australia) Will Power (Andretti Global) – 57.9495(Lap 122)
Official results

== Championship standings after the race ==
Drivers' Championship standings

	Pos.	Driver	Points
Unchanged	1	(Spain) Álex Palou	553
Unchanged	2	(United States) Kyle Kirkwood	462 (-91)
Plus	3	(Denmark) Christian Lundgaard	443 (-110)
Minus	4	(United States) David Malukas	411 (-142)
Unchanged	5	(Mexico) Pato O'Ward	399 (-154)

Engine manufacturer standings

	Pos.	Manufacturer	Points
Unchanged	1	Honda	1316
Unchanged	2	Chevrolet	1124 (–192)

- Note: Only the top five positions are included.

== Broadcasting ==
=== Television ===
The race was televised live on Fox in the second year of a multi-year contract with the series. Practice and qualifying was aired on FS1 and FS2. Will Buxton served as the lead commentator with driver analysts James Hinchcliffe and Townsend Bell. Pre-race host Chris Myers and analyst Danica Patrick returned to the crew after serving in those roles at the Indianapolis 500. They were joined by Fox newcomer Hélio Castroneves.

Fox
Booth announcers	Pre/Post-race	Pit reporters
Announcer: Will Buxton; Color: Townsend Bell; Color: James Hinchcliffe	Host: Chris Myers; Analyst: Helio Castroneves; Analyst: Danica Patrick; Features: Tom Rinaldi	Kevin Lee; Georgia Henneberry; Jack Harvey; Jamie Little

=== Radio ===
The race was broadcast by INDYCAR Radio. The chief announcer is Mark Jaynes in his eleventh year as chief announcer, and 31st year overall with the network. The broadcast was be carried on 32 terrestrial radio affiliates in the United States, along with SiriusXM and online streaming.

IMS Radio Network
Booth Announcers	Turn Reporter	Pit/garage reporters
Chief Announcer: Mark Jaynes; Driver analyst: Matthew Brabham	Jake Query	Alex Wollf; Jonathan Grace

== Notes ==
Previous race: 2026 Ontario Honda Dealers Indy Markham	IndyCar Series; 2026 season	Next race: 2026 Snap-on IndyCar Weekend
Previous race: —	Freedom 250 Grand Prix	Next race: —
