= IndyCar Series at the Circuit de Barcelona-Catalunya =

IndyCar Series race at the Circuit de Barcelona-Catalunya

IndyCar Series
- Venue: Circuit de Barcelona-Catalunya
- Location: Montmeló, Barcelona, Catalonia, Spain
- First race: 2027
- Distance: TBA
- Laps: TBA
- Most wins (manufacturer): Chassis: Dallara IR-18; Engine:

Circuit information
- Length: 4.657 km (2.894 mi)
- Turns: 14

The IndyCar Series at the Circuit de Barcelona-Catalunya is a IndyCar Series race that is scheduled to be held at the Circuit de Barcelona-Catalunya in Montmeló, near Barcelona, Catalonia.

The 2027 running of the race will become the first IndyCar event to be held in Spain; the first held outside of the United States and Canada since the São Paulo Indy 300 in 2013; and the first to be held in Europe since the Bavaria Champ Car Grand Prix in the Netherlands in 2007.

== History ==
On 19 October 2026, it was rumored that a race would be held at the Circuit de Barcelona-Catalunya as part of a multi-year deal beginning in 2027. With the absence of the circuit from Formula One's 2027 calendar, an opportunity opened for IndyCar to strike a deal with the venue's organizers to host from 2027. The race was officially announced in 23 October 2026, alongside the full release of the 2027 IndyCar Series race calendar. The race will be in the home country of five-time and reigning IndyCar Series champion Álex Palou.

== Past winners ==
Season	Date	Driver	Team	Chassis	Engine	Race Distance		Race Time	Average Speed	Report
Season	Date	Driver	Team	Chassis	Engine	Laps	Miles (km)	Race Time	Average Speed	Report
2027	July 18			Dallara IR-18	Chevrolet or Honda					Report
