= 2027 Indianapolis 500 =

American motor race

111th Indianapolis 500
Indianapolis Motor Speedway

Indianapolis 500
- Sanctioning body: IndyCar
- Season: 2027 IndyCar Series
- Date: May 30, 2027

Television in the United States
- Network: Fox
- Announcers: Will Buxton, James Hinchcliffe, Townsend Bell

Chronology
Previous	Next
2026	2028

The 2027 Indianapolis 500 (branded as the 111th Running of the Indianapolis 500 presented by Gainbridge for sponsorship reasons) is an IndyCar Series race that will be held on Sunday May 30, 2027, at the Indianapolis Motor Speedway in Speedway, Indiana. The month of May activities formally begin with the Sonsio Grand Prix on the combined road course.

The annual Open Test, which includes rookie orientation, will take place on May 4–5. Practice will begin on Tuesday, May 18, and Time Trials are scheduled for May 22–23. Carb Day, the traditional final day of practice, along with the Pit Stop Challenge, will take place on Friday May 28. Felix Rosenqvist, the 2026 winner will be attempting to defend his victory, having announced a switch from Meyer Shank Racing to Arrow McLaren, his second stint with that team.

This will be the final Indianapolis 500 for the Dallara DW12 chassis, which debuted in 2012. The current iteration, the UAK-18 (with 2020-adopted aeroscreen), along with the 2.2 L, V-6 hybrid energy recovery system powertrains, will be retired at the end of the 2027 season. The new Dallara IR-28 chassis, and a 2.4 L, V-6 engine formula will be introduced in 2028.

== Race background ==
The Indianapolis 500, commonly called the Indy 500, is held at the Indianapolis Motor Speedway, a 2.5-mile (4.02 km) paved oval. First held in 1911, it is currently a points-paying race of the NTT IndyCar Series. The event is contested by "Indy cars", a formula of professional-level, single-seat, open cockpit, open-wheel, purpose-built race cars. The race is the most prestigious event of the IndyCar calendar, and one of the oldest and most important automobile races in the world. The race traditionally has a field of 33 cars.

=== Rule changes ===
- Non-chartered ("Indy-only") entries in the IndyCar Series are no longer permitted to compete in races other than the Indianapolis 500.

Previous race: 2027 Sonsio Grand Prix	IndyCar Series; 2027 season	Next race: 2027 Chevrolet Detroit Grand Prix
Previous race: 2026 Indianapolis 500	Indianapolis 500	Next race: 2028 Indianapolis 500
