= Dylan Christie =

American racing driver

- Nationality: (United States) American
- Born: November 6, 2003 (age 23) Princeton, New Jersey, U.S.

U.S. F2000 National Championship career
- Debut season: 2021
- Current team: DEForce Racing
- Car number: 11
- Former teams: Turn 3 Motorsport
- Starts: 33
- Wins: 0
- Podiums: 1
- Poles: 0
- Fastest laps: 0
- Best finish: 15th in 2021

Previous series
- 2020: F1600 Championship Series

Dylan Christie (born November 6, 2003) is an American racing driver. He currently competes in the U.S. F2000 National Championship with DEForce Racing. Christie previously competed in the championship with Turn 3 Motorsport in 2021.

== Career ==
=== U.S. F2000 National Championship ===
On January 8, 2021, it was announced that Christie would compete in the U.S. F2000 National Championship for Turn 3 Motorsport in 2021. He finished 15th in the championship.

In 2022, Christie would switch to DEForce Racing.

== Racing record ==
=== Career summary ===
Season	Series	Team	Races	Wins	Poles	F/Laps	Podiums	Points	Position
2020	F1600 Championship Series	Team Pelfrey	15	4	0	3	12	599	**2nd**
2021	U.S. F2000 National Championship	Turn 3 Motorsport	18	0	0	0	0	121	15th
2022	U.S. F2000 National Championship	DEForce Racing	18	0	0	0	1	188	11th

* Season still in progress.

=== American open-wheel racing results ===
==== U.S. F2000 National Championship ====
(key) (Races in bold indicate pole position) (Races in italics indicate fastest lap) (Races with * indicate most race laps led)

Year	Team	1	2	3	4	5	6	7	8	9	10	11	12	13	14	15	16	17	18	Rank	Points
2021	Turn 3 Motorsport	ALA; 1; 21	ALA; 2; 20	STP; 1; 9	STP; 2; 13	IMS; 1; 8	IMS; 2; 11	IMS; 3; 24	LOR; 10	ROA; 1; 15	ROA; 2; 9	MOH; 1; 20	MOH; 2; 25	MOH; 3; 26	NJMP; 1; 15	NJMP; 2; 14	NJMP; 3; 13	MOH; 4; 12	MOH; 5; 14	15th	121
2022	DEForce Racing	STP; 1; 9	STP; 2; 13	ALA; 1; 15	ALA; 2; 8	IMS; 1; 18	IMS; 2; 14	IMS; 3; 21	IRP; 10	ROA; 1; 4	ROA; 2; 6	MOH; 1; 8	MOH; 2; 20	MOH; 3; 5	TOR; 1; 10	TOR; 2; 3	POR; 1; 18	POR; 2; 7	POR; 3; 15	11th	188

* Season still in progress.
