= Washington Street Circuit =

Racetrack in Washington, D.C.

- Street Circuit (2026)
- Location: Washington, D.C., U.S.
- Coordinates: 38°53′14″N 77°02′11″W
- FIA Grade: 2
- Opened: 22 August 2026; 2 months ago
- Closed: 23 August 2026; 2 months ago
- Architect: Tony Cottman
- Major events: Current: IndyCar Series; Freedom 250 Grand Prix (2026); IROC (2026)

Street Circuit (2026)
- Length: 1.700 mi (2.736 km)
- Turns: 7
- Race lap record: 0:57.9495 ( (Australia) Will Power, Dallara IR-18, 2026, IndyCar)

The Washington Street Circuit is a 1.700 mi (2.736 km) street circuit in the city of Washington, D.C. that hosted the NTT IndyCar Series and IROC in 2026.

== History ==
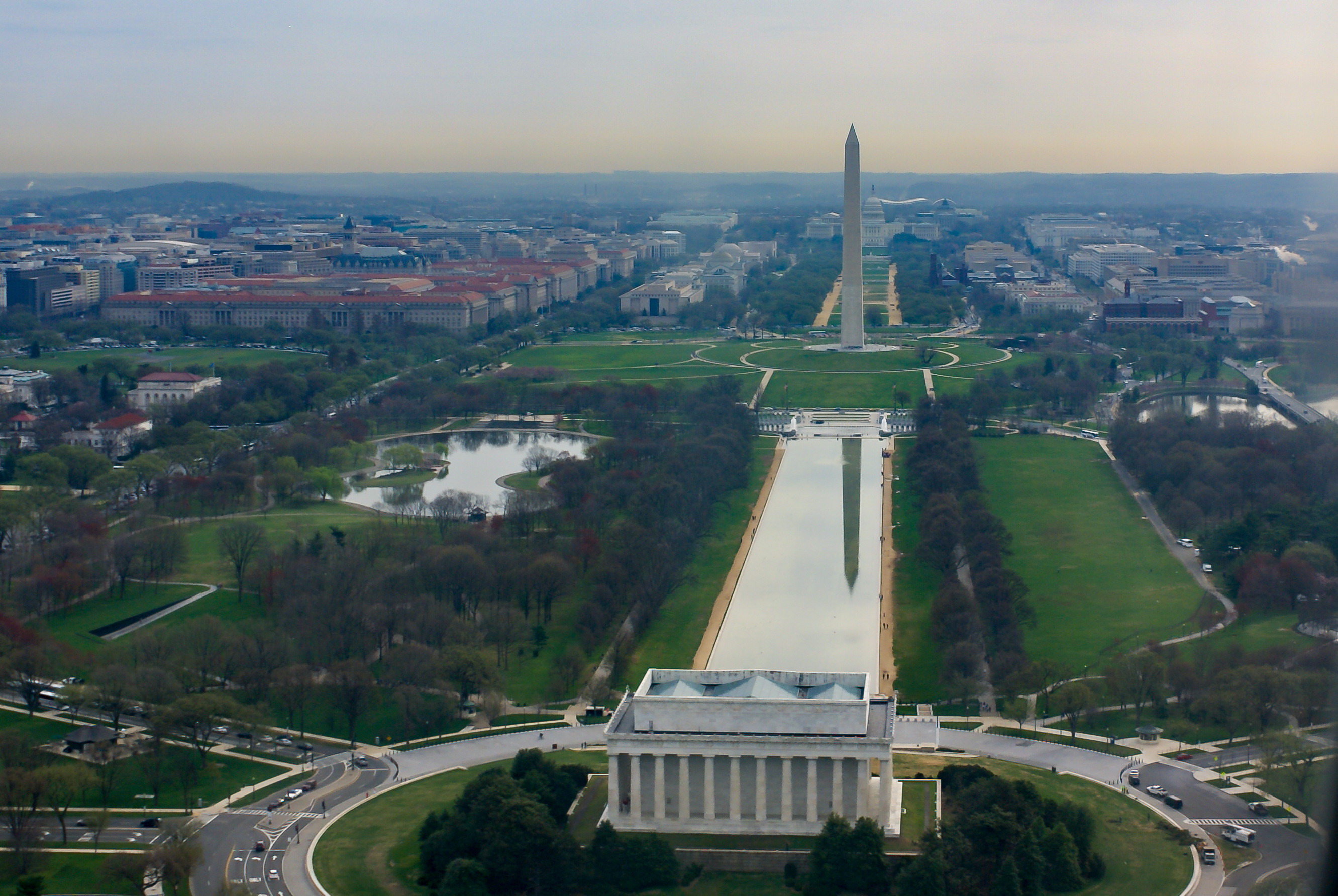
The National Mall, the area where the race was held. The Lincoln Memorial and its reflecting pool, the Washington Monument behind it, and the United States Capitol in the background

The original 2026 IndyCar Series schedule was released on September 16, 2025, with no races in Washington, D.C. Rumors circulated that President Donald Trump wanted to host a race to celebrate the United States Semiquincentennial. The race was officially announced on January 30, 2026, with President Trump signing an executive order authorizing the race. The order instructed the secretary of the interior and the secretary of transportation to design the course layout within 14 days and to "ensure that all permits, approvals, and other authorizations ... are issued and granted as expeditiously as possible". The executive order also instructed the two Secretaries, in coordination with Washington, D.C. mayor Muriel Bowser, to "ensure that any roads, trails, or bridges to be used as part of the race course are properly maintained and capable of being used in such a manner". The street circuit will be composed around the National Mall. It is the second race hosted in Washington, D.C. since America's 25th birthday (the other was the 2002 Grand Prix of Washington D.C.) on July 4, 1801, when festivities including horseback riding and cockfighting were celebrated. President Thomas Jefferson and the Washington Jockey Club "established a racecourse just blocks from the White House, with part of the course running across Pennsylvania Avenue and through what is now Lafayette Park" according to the White House Historical Association.

== Events ==
Current

- August: IndyCar Series Freedom 250 Grand Prix, IROC

== Lap records ==
As of August 2026, the fastest official race lap records at the Washington Street Circuit are listed as:

| Category | Time | Driver | Vehicle | Event |
Street Circuit (2026): 1.700 mi (2.736 km)
| IndyCar | 0:57.9495 | Will Power | Dallara IR-18 | 2026 Freedom 250 Grand Prix |
| IROC | 1:13.764 | Helio Castroneves | Pontiac Firebird IROC | 2026 Washington IROC round |
