= 2025 Trans-Am Series =

Motor racing competition

The 2025 Trans-Am Series season was the 57th running of the Trans-Am Series and was sanctioned by SCCA Pro Racing. The National Championship began at Sebring International Raceway on February 20, and finished at Circuit of The Americas on November 2. The Western Championship began at Sonoma Raceway on April 24. It also finished at Circuit of The Americas on November 2. Both championships ran together at three rounds of the season.

This season saw the introduction of the new Toyota Camry Trans Am TA2 body by Toyota Racing Development (TRD).

== National Championship ==
=== Calendar ===
Round	Event	Circuit	Date
1	Sebring SpeedTour	Sebring International Raceway, Sebring, Florida	February 20–23
2	Mission Foods Road Atlanta SpeedTour	(Georgia (U.S. state)) Road Atlanta, Braselton, Georgia	March 20–23
3	Sonoma SpeedTour	Sonoma Raceway, Sonoma, California	April 24–27
4	Mission Foods Laguna Seca SpeedTour	WeatherTech Raceway Laguna Seca, Monterey, California	May 2–4
5	Lime Rock SpeedTour	Lime Rock Park, Lakeville, Connecticut	May 23–26
6	Mid-Ohio SpeedTour	Mid-Ohio Sports Car Course Lexington, Ohio	June 19–22
7	Road America SpeedTour	Road America, Elkhart Lake, Wisconsin	June 26–29
8	Watkins Glen SpeedTour	(New York (state)) Watkins Glen International, Watkins Glen, New York	July 11–13
9	CTMP SpeedTour	Canadian Tire Motorsport Park, Bowmanville, Canada	August 28–31
10	VIR SpeedTour	Virginia International Raceway, Alton, Virginia	September 18–21
11	Barber SpeedTour	Barber Motorsports Park, Birmingham, Alabama	October 17–19
12	COTA SpeedTour	Circuit of the Americas, Austin, Texas	October 30–November 2

=== Entry list ===
==== TA/GT/SGT/XGT/GT1/TAC ====
Car	No.	Driver	Rounds
TA
Chevrolet Camaro	7	(United States) Keith Grant	1–2
Chevrolet Camaro	8	(United States) Tomy Drissi	All
Chevrolet Camaro	17	(United States) Adam Andretti	1–3, 5–12
Chevrolet Camaro	59	(United States) Simon Gregg	12
Chevrolet Camaro	70	(United States) Brent Crews	1–2
Chevrolet Camaro	70	(United States) David Pintaric	4
Chevrolet Corvette	23	(United States) Amy Ruman	1–11
Dodge Challenger	2	(United States) Brent Crews	3–4
Dodge Challenger	2	(United States) Aaron Quine	6
Dodge Challenger	2	(United States) Kaz Grala	8
Ford Mustang	3	(United States) Paul Menard	1–8, 10–12
Ford Mustang	4	(United States) Wally Dallenbach	1, 6
Ford Mustang	16	(United States) Chris Dyson	1, 3–11
Ford Mustang	16	(United States) Matthew Brabham	2, 12
Ford Mustang	21	(United Kingdom) Humaid Masaood	1–2, 8–11
Ford Mustang	21	(United States) Matthew Brabham	5–7
Ford Mustang	21	(United States) Adam Andretti	4
Ford Mustang	31	(United States) Brandon Jones	1, 7, 10
Ford Mustang	31	(United States) Paul Menard	9
Ford Mustang	57	(United States) David Pintaric	1–3, 6–8, 11
SGT
Chevrolet Camaro	49	(United States) Patrick Utt	1–2, 12
Chevrolet Corvette	54	(United States) Eric Foss	2, 11
Chevrolet Corvette	71	(United States) David Melnick	5
Dodge Challenger	09	(United States) Rene Molina Jr	12
Dodge Viper	84	(United States) Lee Saunders	1
Ferrari 458 Challenge	97	(United States) Chris Coffey	12
Ferrari 458 Challenge Evo	03	(United States) Yousuf Nabi	3
Ford Mustang	00	(United States) Ray Mason	8
Ford Mustang	0	(United States) Ray Mason	9
Ford Mustang	34	(United States) Patrick Paul	7, 10–11
Ford Mustang	36	(United States) Joshua Carlson	1–5, 7–10, 12
Ford Mustang	60	(United States) Tim Gray	6–7, 12
Ford Mustang	82	(United States) Ray Mason	6
Pontiac Grand Prix	7	(United States) Rudy Revak	3–4
Porsche 991.1 GT3 Cup	6	(United States) Carey Grant	2, 6, 10–11
Porsche 991.1 GT3 Cup	12	(United States) JD Koos	3–4
Porsche 991.1 GT3 Cup	55	(United States) Milton Grant	2, 6, 8, 10–11
Porsche 992	15	(United States) Milton Grant	12
XGT
IRC GT	10	(Canada) Paul Tracy	1–2
Chevrolet Corvette	0	(United States) Austin Hill	6
Chevrolet Corvette	02	(United States) Kaylee Bryson	1–2, 6–7, 10–11
Chevrolet Corvette	82	(Canada) James Beaton	8–9
Lamborghini Huracán GT3 Evo	22	(United States) Xuanqian Wang	3–4
Mercedes-AMG GT3	14	(United States) Billy Griffin	1–2, 10–11
Mercedes-AMG GT3 Evo	42	(United States) Danny Lowry	1–2, 10–11
Porsche 911 GT3 R	51	(United States) Shannon Herford	2
Porsche 991 GT3 R	10	(United States) Erich Joiner	5, 11
Porsche 992 GT3 R	68	(United States) Mustafa Bakir	1
GT
Aston Martin GT4	89	(United States) Mike Fitzpatrick	1
Chevrolet Camaro	65	(United States) Joe Bogetich	12
Chevrolet Corvette	28	(United States) Casey Jones	10, 12
FFR Daytona 65 R	47	(United States) Brion Gluck	11
Ford Mustang	24	(United States) Derric Carter	12
Ford Mustang	41	(United States) Jeff Lindstrom	1–2
Howe HR6	9	(United States) Adrian Wlostowski	11
Howe HR6	11	(United States) Rich Rinke	6
Howe HR6	12	(United States) Jack Rinke	6
Howe HR6	39	(United States) Todd Napieralski	6
Maserati MC GT4	27	(United States) Jake Latham	11–12
Maserati MC GT4	38	(United States) Colin Cohen	1, 3–4, 6–7, 10–12
Maserati MC GT4	97	(United States) Chris Coffey	1–4, 6–7, 10–11
Porsche 718 Cayman GT4 Clubsport	49	(United States) Ryan Szyjakowski	7
Porsche Cayman S	29	(United States) Maciej Tuniewicz	5
GT1
Chevrolet Camaro	64	(United States) Rob Dickey	2, 7
Chevrolet Corvette	00	(United States) Ray Kobs	7, 12
Ford Mustang	04	(United States) Jon DeGaynor	1, 6–7, 12
Ford Mustang	6	(United States) Colin Comer	7
TAC
Chevrolet Camaro	9	(United States) Ken Thwaits	3–4
Chevrolet Camaro	64	(United States) Rob Dickey	10
Chevrolet Camaro	72	(United States) Michelle Nagai	3–4
Dodge Challenger	85	(United States) Ken Sutherland	3–4
Ford Mustang	04	(United States) Jon DeGaynor	10
Ford Mustang	08	(United States) Derek Thorn	4
Ford Mustang	27	(United States) John Moore	3–4
Ford Mustang	62	(United States) Jim Guthrie	3–4
Ford Mustang	92	(United States) Chris Evans	3–4
Ford Mustang	99	(United States) Cole Moore	4

==== CUBE 3 Architecture TA2 Series ====
Car	No.	Driver	Rounds
TA2
Chevrolet Camaro	00	(United States) Jared Odrick	2, 5–12
Chevrolet Camaro	2	(United States) Mike Skeen	2–5, 7
Chevrolet Camaro	5	(United States) Jordan Menzin	2
Chevrolet Camaro	7	(United States) Noah Harmon	1–3, 5–7, 10–11
Chevrolet Camaro	8	(United States) Carson Brown	1, 3, 8
Chevrolet Camaro	8	(United States) Rob Clifton	2
Chevrolet Camaro	8	(United States) Connor Mosack	5
Chevrolet Camaro	8	(United States) Lanie Buice	10, 12
Chevrolet Camaro	17	(United States) Corey Day	1, 6, 11
Chevrolet Camaro	18	(United States) Caleb Bacon	2, 5
Chevrolet Camaro	26	(United States) Thomas Merrill	1–2, 4–7, 9, 12
Chevrolet Camaro	26	(United States) Brandon Hampson	8
Chevrolet Camaro	26	(United States) Tyler Kicera	11
Chevrolet Camaro	27	(United States) Barry Boes	1–8
Chevrolet Camaro	27	(United States) Helio Meza	12
Chevrolet Camaro	28	(United States) Tristan McKee	1–2, 5–7, 9–12
Chevrolet Camaro	28	(United States) JC Meynet	3–4
Chevrolet Camaro	33	(United States) Greg Tolson	3
Chevrolet Camaro	41	(United States) Adam Andretti	1
Chevrolet Camaro	46	(United States) Tim Carroll	3–4, 12
Chevrolet Camaro	48	(United States) Mike Skeen	1
Chevrolet Camaro	48	(United States) Naz Olkhovskyi	10–11
Chevrolet Camaro	53	(United States) Bryan Scheible	9, 12
Chevrolet Camaro	55	(United States) Clay Koevary	3–4
Chevrolet Camaro	57	(Brazil) Rafa Matos	1–7
Chevrolet Camaro	66	(United States) Caleb Shrader	3
Chevrolet Camaro	67	(United States) Matt Griffin	1–2, 10–12
Chevrolet Camaro	75	(United States) Jake Bollman	11
Chevrolet Camaro	93	(Sweden) Andreas Nilsson	11
Chevrolet Camaro	98	(Norway) Stein Frederic Akre	4
Chevrolet Camaro	100	(United States) Jared Odrick	3–4
Chevrolet Camaro	117	(United States) Corey Day	3
Chevrolet Camaro	128	(United States) Tristan McKee	3–4
Chevrolet Camaro	128	(United States) JC Meynet	12
Chevrolet Camaro	198	(Norway) Stein Frederic Akre	3, 12
Dodge Challenger	88	(United States) Viktor Czapla	4
Ford Mustang	00	(United States) Jared Odrick	1
Ford Mustang	00	(United States) John Schweitzer	4
Ford Mustang	02	(United States) John Atwell	12
Ford Mustang	2	(United States) Jim Guthrie	1
Ford Mustang	3	(United States) Adrian Wlostowski	All
Ford Mustang	6	(United States) Jim Gallaugher	9–12
Ford Mustang	9	(United States) Keith Prociuk	1–3, 5–12
Ford Mustang	10	(United States) Tyler Gonzalez	1
Ford Mustang	12	(Argentina) Valentin Aguirre	1–2, 7
Ford Mustang	12	(Argentina) Diego Ciantini	10
Ford Mustang	14	(United States) Matt Parent	3
Ford Mustang	14	(United States) Bryan Scheible	11
Ford Mustang	15	(Australia) Edan Thornburrow	1–2, 5
Ford Mustang	16	(United States) Jim Gallaugher	1–3, 5–8
Ford Mustang	17	(United States) Tim Lynn	3–4
Ford Mustang	18	(United States) Jordan Menzin	1
Ford Mustang	20	(United States) Seamus McKendree	3–4, 8, 10, 12
Ford Mustang	20	(United States) JC Meynet	7
Ford Mustang	22	(United States) Frank Widmoser	12
Ford Mustang	29	(United States) Maciej Tuniewicz	1, 5, 8, 10
Ford Mustang	30	(United States) Julian DaCosta	1–5
Ford Mustang	31	(United States) Michael LaPaglia	3–4
Ford Mustang	34	(United States) Patrick Paul	1–2
Ford Mustang	38	(United States) Troy Ermish	3
Ford Mustang	39	(United States) Bob Accardo	1, 3–8, 10, 12
Ford Mustang	40	(United States) Mia Lovell	1–2
Ford Mustang	43	(United States) Jacob Yesnick	1–2
Ford Mustang	47	(United States) Dominic Starkweather	1–2, 4
Ford Mustang	51	(United States) Will Robinson	1–8, 10–12
Ford Mustang	60	(United States) Boris Said Jr.	1–2
Ford Mustang	61	(United States) Roberto Sabato	1–2, 7–9
Ford Mustang	64	(United States) Matt Gray	1–2, 6–7, 10–12
Ford Mustang	69	(Canada) Brody Goble	3–4, 12
Ford Mustang	70	(United States) Sam Corry	1–2
Ford Mustang	71	(United States) Eric Cayton	1–7, 9–12
Ford Mustang	80	(United States) Kyle Kelley	3–4, 12
Ford Mustang	80	(United States) Ben Maier	6
Ford Mustang	80	(United States) JC Meynet	10
Ford Mustang	80	(United States) Ethan Ayars	11
Ford Mustang	87	(United States) Doug Peterson	1
Ford Mustang	89	(United States) Austin Green	1
Ford Mustang	90	(United States) Thomas Annunziata	1
Ford Mustang	95	(United States) Gian Buffomante	1–5
Ford Mustang	97	(United States) Tom Sheehan	1–11
Ford Mustang	98	(United States) Doug Winston	1–3, 5–9, 11–12
Ford Mustang	99	(United States) Cale Phillips	1–2, 5–8, 10–12
Ford Mustang	99	(United States) Cole Moore	3–4
Ford Mustang	127	(United States) John Moore	3
Toyota Camry	2	(United States) Carson Brown	10, 12
Toyota Camry	10	(United States) Tyler Gonzalez	2, 9
Toyota Camry	10	(United States) Brent Crews	3–4
Toyota Camry	10	(United States) Corey Heim	5
Toyota Camry	10	(United States) Tyler Kicera	7–8
Toyota Camry	10	(United States) Ben Maier	10
Toyota Camry	10	(United States) Thomas Annunziata	11
Toyota Camry	10	(United States) Boris Said Jr.	12
Toyota Camry	15	(Australia) Nathan Herne	8, 12
Toyota Camry	30	(United States) Julian DaCosta	6–12
Toyota Camry	40	(United States) Mia Lovell	3–4, 6, 10, 12
Toyota Camry	60	(United States) Boris Said Jr.	3–11
Toyota Camry	60	(United States) Ben Maier	12
Toyota Camry	70	(United States) Sam Corry	3–12
Toyota Camry	90	(United States) Thomas Annunziata	2–8
Toyota Camry	90	(United States) Ethan Ayars	12
Toyota Camry	95	(United States) Gian Buffomante	6–12

=== Race results ===
Round	Circuit	TA Winning driver	TA2 Winning driver	XGT Winning driver	SGT Winning driver	GT Winning driver	TAC Winning driver	GT1 Winning driver
1	Sebring International Raceway	(United States) Paul Menard	(United States) Thomas Annunziata	(Canada) Paul Tracy	(United States) Joshua Carlson	(United States) Chris Coffey	Did not participate	No entries
2	Road Atlanta	(United States) Matthew Brabham	(United States) Thomas Annunziata	(Canada) Paul Tracy	(United States) Joshua Carlson	(United States) Chris Coffey	Did not participate	(United States) Rob Dickey
3	Sonoma Raceway	(United States) Paul Menard	(United States) Brent Crews	(United States) Xuanqian Wang	(United States) Joshua Carlson	(United States) Chris Coffey	(United States) Jim Guthrie	No entries
4	Laguna Seca	(United States) Chris Dyson	(Brazil) Rafa Matos	No finishers	(United States) Joshua Carlson	(United States) Colin Cohen	(United States) Ken Sutherland	No entries
5	Lime Rock Park	(United States) Paul Menard	(United States) Sam Corry	(United States) Erich Joiner	(United States) Joshua Carlson	(United States) Maciej Tuniewicz	Did not participate	No entries
6	Mid-Ohio Sports Car Course	(United States) Matthew Brabham	(United States) Tristan McKee	(United States) Kaylee Bryson	(United States) Carey Grant	(United States) Chris Coffey	Did not participate	(United States) Jon DeGaynor
7	Road America	(United States) Chris Dyson	(United States) Mike Skeen	(United States) Kaylee Bryson	(United States) Joshua Carlson	(United States) Chris Coffey	Did not participate	(United States) Colin Comer
8	Watkins Glen International	(United States) Paul Menard	(United States) Tyler Kicera	(Canada) James Beaton	(United States) Joshua Carlson	No entries	Did not participate	No entries
9	Canadian Tire Motorsport Park	(United States) Paul Menard	(United States) Tristan McKee	(Canada) James Beaton	No starters	No entries	Did not participate	No entries
10	Virginia International Raceway	(United States) Chris Dyson	(United States) Carson Brown	(United States) Billy Griffin	(United States) Patrick Paul	(United States) Chris Coffey	Did not participate	(United States) Jon DeGaynor
11	Barber Motorsports Park	(United States) Adam Andretti	(United States) Tristan McKee	(United States) Erich Joiner	(United States) Eric Foss	(United States) Adrian Wlostowski	Did not participate	No entries
12	Circuit of the Americas	(United States) Matthew Brabham	(United States) Helio Meza	No entries	(United States) Joshua Carlson	(United States) Jake Latham	No entries	(United States) Jon DeGaynor

== Western Championship ==
=== Calendar ===
Round	Event	Circuit	Date
1	Buttonwillow SpeedTour	Buttonwillow Raceway Park, Buttonwillow, California	March 14–26
2	Sonoma SpeedTour	Sonoma Raceway, Sonoma, California	April 24–27
3	Mission Foods Laguna Seca SpeedTour	WeatherTech Raceway Laguna Seca, Monterey, California	May 2–4
4	PIR SpeedTour	Portland International Raceway, Portland, Oregon	July 25–27
5	Thunderhill SpeedTour	Thunderhill Raceway Park, Willows, California	October 10–12
6	COTA SpeedTour	Circuit of the Americas, Austin, Texas	October 30–November 2

=== Entry list ===
Car	No.	Driver	Rounds
TA
Chevrolet Camaro	8	(United States) Tomy Drissi	2–3, 6
Chevrolet Camaro	17	(United States) Adam Andretti	2, 6
Chevrolet Camaro	59	(United States) Simon Gregg	6
Chevrolet Camaro	70	(United States) David Pintaric	3
Chevrolet Corvette	23	(United States) Amy Ruman	2–3
Dodge Challenger	2	(United States) Brent Crews	2–3
Ford Mustang	3	(United States) Paul Menard	2–3, 6
Ford Mustang	16	(United States) Chris Dyson	2–3
Ford Mustang	16	(United States) Matthew Brabham	6
Ford Mustang	21	(United States) Adam Andretti	3
Ford Mustang	57	(United States) David Pintaric	2
Ford Mustang	88	(Canada) Cole Boudreau	4
TA2
Chevrolet Camaro	00	(United States) Jared Odrick	6
Chevrolet Camaro	8	(United States) Lanie Buice	6
Chevrolet Camaro	26	(United States) Thomas Merrill	6
Chevrolet Camaro	27	(United States) Barry Boes	2–3
Chevrolet Camaro	27	(United States) Helio Meza	6
Chevrolet Camaro	28	(United States) JC Meynet	1–5
Chevrolet Camaro	28	(United States) Tristan McKee	6
Chevrolet Camaro	33	(United States) Greg Tolson	2
Chevrolet Camaro	46	(United States) Tim Carroll	All
Chevrolet Camaro	53	(United States) Bryan Scheible	6
Chevrolet Camaro	55	(United States) Clay Koevary	1–3
Chevrolet Camaro	66	(United States) Caleb Shrader	2–3
Chevrolet Camaro	66	(United States) Amir Haleem	5
Chevrolet Camaro	67	(United States) Matt Griffin	6
Chevrolet Camaro	92	(Norway) Stein Frederic Akre	1
Chevrolet Camaro	98	(Norway) Stein Frederic Akre	3–5
Chevrolet Camaro	128	(United States) JC Meynet	6
Chevrolet Camaro	198	(Norway) Stein Frederic Akre	2, 6
Dodge Challenger	88	(United States) Viktor Czapla	1, 3
Ford Mustang	00	(United States) John Schweitzer	3–4
Ford Mustang	02	(United States) John Atwell	6
Ford Mustang	3	(United States) Adrian Wlostowski	6
Ford Mustang	6	(United States) Jim Gallaugher	6
Ford Mustang	9	(United States) Keith Prociuk	6
Ford Mustang	17	(United States) Tim Lynn	1–5
Ford Mustang	20	(United States) Seamus McKendree	All
Ford Mustang	22	(United States) Frank Widmoser	6
Ford Mustang	24	(United States) Brad McAllister	1, 4
Ford Mustang	31	(United States) Michael LaPaglia	1–4
Ford Mustang	32	(United States) Barry Boes	1, 4
Ford Mustang	33	(United States) Greg Tolson	1
Ford Mustang	34	(United States) Patrick Paul	4
Ford Mustang	38	(United States) Troy Ermish	2
Ford Mustang	39	(United States) Bob Accardo	6
Ford Mustang	40	(United States) Mia Lovell	1
Ford Mustang	51	(United States) Will Robinson	6
Ford Mustang	64	(United States) Matt Gray	6
Ford Mustang	66	(United States) Caleb Shrader	1
Ford Mustang	69	(Canada) Brody Goble	All
Ford Mustang	71	(United States) Eric Cayton	6
Ford Mustang	80	(United States) Kyle Kelley	All
Ford Mustang	98	(United States) Doug Winston	6
Ford Mustang	99	(United States) Cole Moore	1–4
Ford Mustang	99	(United States) Cale Phillips	6
Ford Mustang	127	(United States) John Moore	2
Toyota Camry	2	(United States) Carson Brown	6
Toyota Camry	10	(United States) Jade Avedisian	4
Toyota Camry	10	(United States) Boris Said Jr.	6
Toyota Camry	15	(Australia) Nathan Herne	6
Toyota Camry	19	(Australia) Jack Perkins	4
Toyota Camry	30	(United States) Julian DaCosta	6
Toyota Camry	40	(United States) Mia Lovell	2–6
Toyota Camry	44	(United States) Brian Lock	5
Toyota Camry	60	(United States) Ben Maier	6
Toyota Camry	70	(United States) Sam Corry	6
Toyota Camry	90	(United States) Ethan Ayars	6
Toyota Camry	95	(United States) Gian Buffomante	6
SGT
Chevrolet Camaro	49	(United States) Patrick Utt	6
Ferrari 458 Challenge	97	(United States) Chris Coffey	6
Ferrari 458 Challenge Evo	03	(United States) Yousuf Nabi	2
Ford Mustang	36	(United States) Joshua Carlson	2–3, 6
Ford Mustang	60	(United States) Tim Gray	6
Pontiac Grand Prix	7	(United States) Rudy Revak	2–3
Porsche 991.1 GT3 Cup	12	(United States) JD Koos	3
Porsche 991.2 GT3 Cup	81	(United States) Simon Asselin	1–2
Porsche 992	15	(United States) Milton Grant	6
XGT
Lamborghini Huracán GT3 Evo	22	(United States) Xuanqian Wang	2–3
Porsche 991.1 GT3 Cup	12	(United States) JD Koos	1
Porsche 991.2 GT3 Cup	81	(United States) Simon Asselin	4
GT
Chevrolet Camaro	65	(United States) Joe Bogetich	6
Chevrolet Corvette	28	(United States) Casey Jones	6
Ford Mustang	24	(United States) Derric Carter	6
Maserati MC GT4	27	(United States) Jake Latham	6
Maserati MC GT4	38	(United States) Colin Cohen	2–3, 6
Maserati MC GT4	97	(United States) Chris Coffey	2–3
TAC
Chevrolet Camaro	9	(United States) Ken Thwaits	1–4
Chevrolet Camaro	72	(United States) Michelle Nagai	1–3, 5
Dodge Challenger	85	(United States) Ken Sutherland	1–5
Ford Mustang	08	(United States) Derek Thorn	1, 3
Ford Mustang	27	(United States) John Moore	1–5
Ford Mustang	62	(United States) Jim Guthrie	2–3
Ford Mustang	92	(United States) Chris Evans	1–4
Ford Mustang	99	(United States) Cole Moore	3
GT1
Chevrolet Corvette	00	(United States) Ray Kobs	6
Ford Mustang	04	(United States) Jon DeGaynor	6

=== Race results ===
Round	Circuit	TA Winning driver	TA2 Winning driver	XGT Winning driver	SGT Winning driver	GT Winning driver	TAC Winning driver	GT1 Winning driver
1	Buttonwillow Raceway Park	No entries	(Canada) Brody Goble	(United States) JD Koos	(United States) Simon Asselin	No entries	(United States) John Moore	No entries
2	Sonoma Raceway	(United States) Paul Menard	(United States) Barry Boes	(United States) Xuanqian Wang	(United States) Joshua Carlson	(United States) Chris Coffey	(United States) Jim Guthrie	No entries
3	Laguna Seca	(United States) Chris Dyson	(Canada) Brody Goble	No starters	(United States) Joshua Carlson	(United States) Colin Cohen	(United States) Ken Sutherland	No entries
4	Portland International Raceway	(Canada) Cole Boudreau	(Canada) Brody Goble	(United States) Simon Asselin	No entries		(United States) Ken Sutherland	No entries
4	Portland International Raceway	No starters	(Canada) Brody Goble	(United States) Simon Asselin	No entries		(United States) Ken Sutherland	No entries
5	Thunderhill Raceway Park	No entries	(Canada) Brody Goble	No entries	No entries		(United States) Ken Sutherland	No entries
6	Circuit of the Americas	(United States) Matthew Brabham	(United States) Helio Meza	No entries	(United States) Joshua Carlson	(United States) Jake Latham	No entries	(United States) Jon DeGaynor
