= Perrone =

Perrone is an Italian surname; it may refer to:

- Ciro Perrone (1921-2011), New York City mobster and soldier in the Genovese crime family
- Diego Perrone (born 1979), retired Uruguayan footballer
- Dino Perrone Compagni (1879-1950), leading figure in the early years of Italian fascism
- Elisabetta Perrone (born 1968), retired Italian female race walker
- Emanuel Perrone (born 1983), Argentine footballer
- Ettore Perrone di San Martino (1789–1849), Italian politician and military leader
- Felipe Perrone (born 1986), Brazilian water polo player
- Gabriel Perrone (born 1965), Argentine football manager
- Giovanni Perrone (1794–1876), Italian theologian
- Giovanni Tommaso Perrone (1602-1677), Roman Catholic prelate who served as Bishop of Nicastro
- Máximo Perrone (born 2003), Argentine footballer
- Nico Perrone (born 1935), Italian essayist, historian and journalist
- Paul J. Perrone, author of books and articles on various Java-based software technologies
- Serena Perrone (born 1979), American artist
