= Paul J. Perrone =

American writer

Paul J. Perrone has written numerous books and articles on various Java-based software technologies. He has also founded Perrone Robotics fusing open and standard software technologies with the field of robotics. He has helped push robotics into the mainstream and brought the term "popular robotics" into the public eye.

In addition to robotics software for personal and professional use. Perrone was the team lead for Team Jefferson, a 2005 DARPA Grand Challenge team, and a DARPA Grand Challenge (2007) team. He chaired the SAE Committee for On Road Autonomous Vehicle Standards and features prominently in the news and online involving the deployment of autonomous vehicles across applications such as for Jaguar Land Rover, mining trucks, tractor trailers, transit vans, buses for transit, and autonomous shuttles.

He has been a frequent presenter at Sun Microsystem's JavaOne conference, namely James Gosling's keynote sessions presenting an autonomous dune buggy (Tommy), an unmanned helicopter, an autonomous Scion Xb (Tommy Jr), and Lincvolt, an energy-efficient vehicle owned and spearheaded by rock star Neil Young. He received a Duke Award for Tommy, and a Golden Duke and Lifetime Achievement Award for Lincvolt.

He is featured in a documentary about a robotic car entered into the historic 2005 DARPA Grand Challenge and was featured in a Discovery Science special called "RoboCars" for his robotic car entered into the 2007 DARPA Urban Challenge.

In 2010, he was also one of 25 individuals living in Charlottesville, Virginia who are well regarded in their respective fields.

He is the host of the DRIVEN podcast, a podcast about autonomous vehicles, AI, robotics, and more. He has interviewed the likes of James Gosling, Jon Snoddy, and Nolan Bushnell on his show. Nolan Bushnell also sits on the board of Perrone Robotics.
