= LincVolt =

Overview
- Manufacturer: Ford
- Production: 1959
- Assembly: Wixom, Michigan, U.S. (Wixom Assembly Plant)
- Designer: John Najjar

Body and chassis
- Class: large car (EPA)
- Body style: 2-door convertible
- Layout: Front engine, rear-wheel drive

Powertrain
- Engine: Plug-in hybrid 150 kW (200 hp) electric motor/generator units Capstone Microturbine 30 kilowatts (40 hp) range extender/internal combustion engine biodiesel
- Transmission: none
- Range: Over 500 miles (800 km) total electricity/gasoline range according to lincvolt

Dimensions
- Wheelbase: 131.0 in (3,327 mm)
- Length: 1959: 227.1 in (5,768 mm)
- Width: 1959: 80.1 in (2,035 mm)
- Height: 1959: 56.7 in (1,440 mm)
- Curb weight: 5,000–5,700 lb (2,300–2,600 kg)

Chronology
- Predecessor: Lincoln Continental

LincVolt is a 1959 Lincoln Continental, owned by musician Neil Young, that was converted into a more fuel-efficient, hybrid demonstrator vehicle.

LincVolt participated in the Xprize Progressive Insurance Automotive X Prize. The LincVolt team had to withdraw from the X Prize competition as they were making a car whereas the purpose of the competition was to produce a commercial business plan.

A documentary film was being produced by Larry Johnson before his death on January 21, 2010.

On the morning of November 9, 2010, a fire started in LincVolt's charging system while it was recharging at a warehouse belonging to Young. The car was damaged, but it has been restored. The last version of the LincVolt's hybrid engine uses Domestic-Green Carbon-Neutral Cellulosic Ethanol from Biomass.

== Versions ==
=== Version 1: Prototype ===
- Prime builder: Johnathan Goodwin of H-Line Conversions, Wichita, Kansas
- Generator: Mazda Wankel engine
- Prime mover electric motor: UQM 15 kW prime mover
- Batteries: ?

=== Version 2010 ===
In 2010 Neil Young gave a speech at the Specialty Equipment Market Association convention.

- Prime builder: Roy Brizio Street Rods, San Francisco; Perrone Robotics; and Johnathan Goodwin
- Generator: Capstone Microturbine 30 kW
- Prime mover electric motor: UQM 150 kW prime mover
- Batteries: Thunder Sky lithium iron phosphate battery pack made in China, #110 of 110 Amp-Hour

=== Version 2011: After the fire ===
- Prime builder: Roy Brizio Street Rods, San Francisco; and Perrone Robotics
- Generator: Capstone Microturbine 30 kW
- Prime mover electric motor: UQM 150 kW prime mover
- Batteries: A123 Systems lithium-ion battery pack
