= Harold Rosen (electrical engineer) =

American electrical engineer

- Born: Harold Allen Rosen; March 20, 1926; New Orleans, Louisiana, U.S.
- Died: 30 January 2017 (aged 90); Pacific Palisades, Los Angeles, California, U.S.
- Education: California Institute of Technology (MSc., PhD); Tulane University (BEng.)
- Occupation: Electrical engineer
- Known for: Developer of the first geosynchronous satellite

Dr. Harold Allen Rosen (20 March 1926 – 30 January 2017) was an American electrical engineer, known as "the father of the geostationary satellite", and "father of the communications satellite".

He formed and led the team that designed and built the first geosynchronous communications satellite, Syncom, for Hughes Aircraft Company.

== Early life ==
Harold Allen Rosen was born on March 20, 1926, in New Orleans, Louisiana.

He served as a radio communication and radar technician in the U.S. Navy during World War II, from 1944 to 1946. His experiences in the Navy provided him with hands-on experience with radio communications and the then-new field of radars.

He graduated from Tulane University in New Orleans in 1947 with a Bachelor of Engineering degree in electrical engineering. He received an M.S. and a PhD in electrical engineering in 1948 and 1951 respectively from the California Institute of Technology in Pasadena.

== Career ==
While still in graduate school, he began working for Raytheon, where he helped develop early anti-aircraft guided missiles, making many innovations in the fields of radar and missile guidance and control. After joining the Hughes Aircraft Company in 1956, and while he was working on the development of airborne radars, the world was catapulted into the space age by the 1957 launch of Sputnik, the world's first artificial satellite. At the same time, his department's most important program was cancelled. His boss, Frank Carver, challenged him to find a worthwhile new project that could keep the skilled staff gainfully employed.

Stimulated by the possibilities of the new Space Age, Rosen wanted it to be some kind of space program. Because at that time international telephony was very expensive and hard to arrange, and transoceanic television was impossible, he decided it should be some kind of communication satellite since these problems could be solved that way. He began to research what kind of communication satellite system would work best for this purpose. At the time, Rosen was unaware of science writer Arthur C. Clarke's 1945 description of a geosynchronous satellite, but he was aware of the conventional wisdom regarding geostationary satellites, expressed most stridently by the highly regarded Bell Labs, at that time the world's leading communications R&D entity, in a March 1959 IRE Journal titled “Transoceanic Communications Via Satellites,” written by John Pierce and Rudy Kompfner. They expressed the view that geostationary satellites would be too heavy to be launched by the rockets that were then available. And, even if geostationary satellites could be launched, their presumed complexity would prevent them from having a long enough lifetime to be commercially viable. Rosen, in reading their paper, felt otherwise. He reasoned that since Bell Labs designed communication equipment for ground applications, it had little incentive for keeping the weight down. Also, he was confident that his previous experience in guided missile design was more relevant for designing the control system for such a satellite and that the supposedly-complex control system the authors claimed would be necessary would not be needed.

Rosen had an epiphany when it occurred to him that if he used spin-phased impulses on a spin-stabilized satellite, he could have a simple, long-lived control system to go along with the satellite's lightweight electronics. He gathered a small team of gifted colleagues (most notably, Don Williams, Tom Hudspeth and John Mendel) to convert the concept into a design for a practical geostationary communication satellite system. The spin stabilized satellite itself weighed only 55 pounds. When his superiors initially refused to fund the project, Rosen began talking to his contacts at Raytheon; rather than lose him to his previous employer, Hughes' management agreed to support prototype development. He subsequently convinced the U.S. government to fund the Syncom program, a flight program that was based on the Hughes prototype. After a discouraging rocket failure that doomed Syncom I in February 1963, Syncom II was successfully launched in August 1963. It was followed by Syncom III in 1964, in time to relay live television signals from Tokyo during the Summer Olympics. The first commercial satellite, Early Bird, was launched in 1965. With communication satellites a commercial reality, Hughes formed a division to pursue this as a business, and Rosen became its technical director. He later became a vice president of Hughes and a member of its policy board in 1975. In these roles he was key in helping to build the world's largest communications satellite business at Hughes Aircraft Company.

Upon his retirement from Hughes in 1992, he joined with his brother Benjamin in another development project.

== Rosen Motors ==
In 1993 Harold Rosen and his brother Benjamin founded Rosen Motors in Woodland Hills, California. They developed a gas turbine-powered series hybrid automotive powertrain using a 55,000 rpm flywheel energy storage subsystem to provide bursts of acceleration to augment the turbine's more steady power output. The flywheel also stored energy through regenerative braking. The flywheel was composed of a titanium hub with a carbon fiber cylinder and was gimbal mounted to minimize adverse gyroscopic effects on vehicle handling. The prototype vehicle was a Saturn, modified to accept the new engine/flywheel unit. It was successfully road tested in the Mojave Desert in January 1997 but was never mass-produced, when the automakers to whom it was demonstrated chose not to go with the flywheel technology. The company was dissolved in November 1997. Their sister company, Capstone Turbine Corporation (Tarzana, Los Angeles) received the company's technology and continued to develop and market it after 1997.

After the closure of Rosen Motors, Rosen became a consultant for Boeing in the design of new satellite systems.

== Personal life ==
In 1949, Rosen married Rosetta, and they had two sons, Robert (born 1950) and Rocky (born 1966). Rosetta died in 1969. In 1984 he married Deborah Castleman, a satellite systems engineer also working at Hughes Aircraft Company.

Rosen died at his home the Pacific Palisades neighborhood of Los Angeles on January 30, 2017, due to complications from a stroke, aged 90.

== Honors and recognitions ==
Rosen has more than 80 patents. He was a Fellow of the IEEE and the AIAA, and a member of the National Academy of Engineering. Rosen has received numerous awards which include:

- 1964 – The Astronautics Engineer Award, awarded by The National Space Club
- 1965 - Golden Plate Award of the American Academy of Achievement
- 1968 – First Aerospace Communication Award from the American Institute of Aeronautics and Astronautics (AIAA)
- 1973 – The Spacecraft Design of the Award from the AIAA
- 1976 – L. M. Ericsson International Prize for Communications, presented by the King of Sweden
- 1976 – Lloyd V. Berkner Award
- 1976 – Caltech Distinguished Alumni Award
- 1982 – IEEE Alexander Graham Bell Medal
- 1985 – National Medal of Technology
- 1985 – NEC Communications & Computing Prize, in Japan
- 1987 – Inducted into the Society of Satellites Professionals International Hall of Fame
- 1990 – Arthur C. Clarke Award, in Sri Lanka
- 1995 – NAE Charles Stark Draper Prize
- 2003 – Inducted into the National Inventors Hall of Fame
- 2014 – Philip J. Klass Lifetime Achievement Award – Aviation Week & Space Technology magazine
- 2015 – Robert H. Goddard Memorial Trophy, awarded by The National Space Club
