= Cole Moore =

American Professional racing driver (born 1997)

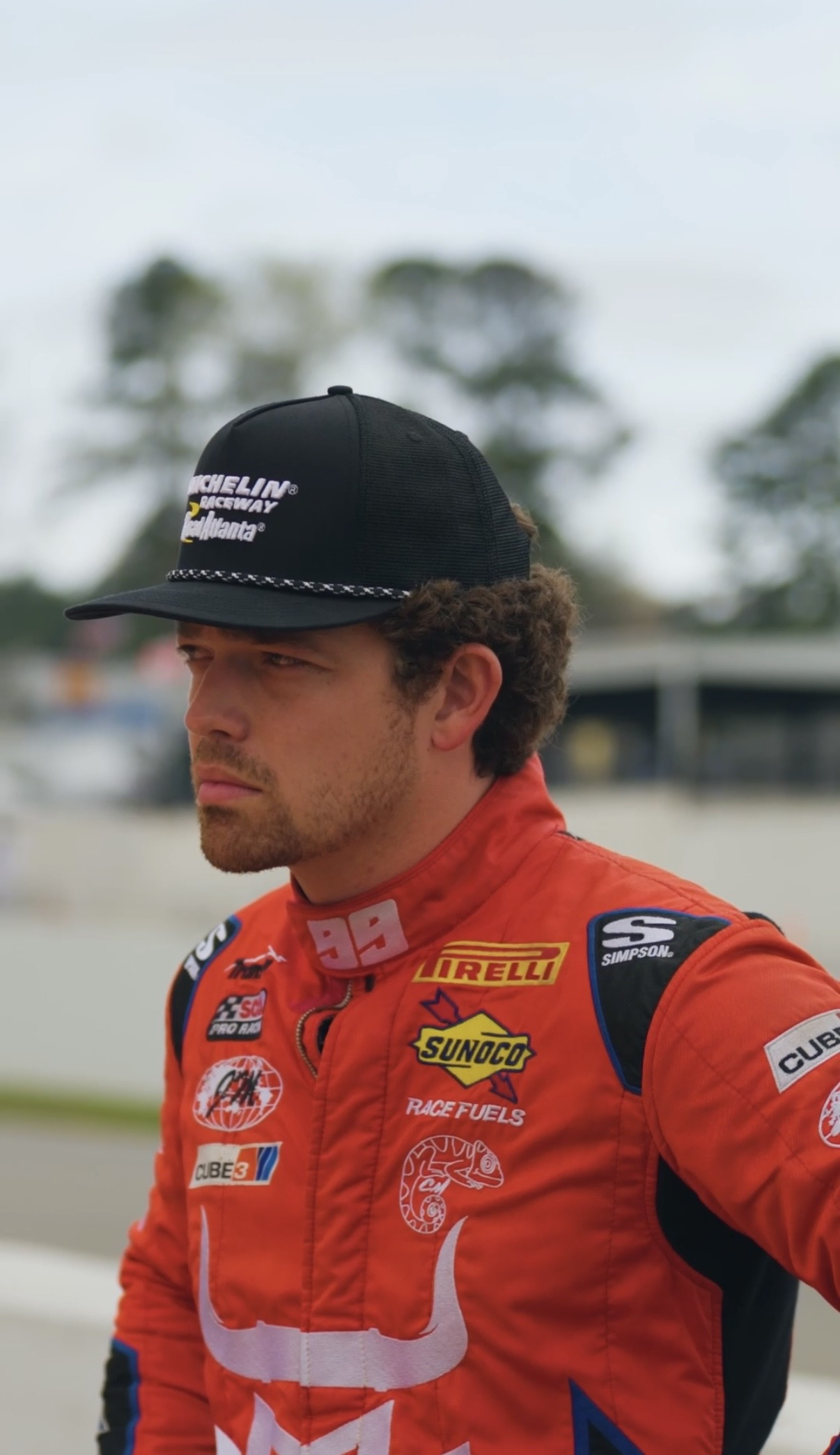
- Moore in 2026
- Born: June 3, 1997 (age 29); Carmichael, California, U.S.

ARCA Menards Series career
- 2 races run over 2 years
- ARCA no., team: BMR #99
- Best finish: 93rd (2021)
- First race: 2021 General Tire 150 (Phoenix)
- Last race: 2022 General Tire 150 (Phoenix)
Wins	Top tens	Poles
0	0	0

ARCA Menards Series West career
- 28 races run over 4 years
- ARCA West no., team: BMR #99
- Best finish: 3rd (2021)
- First race: 2015 Toyota/NAPA Auto Parts 150 (Roseville)
- Last race: 2026 Portland 112 (Portland)
- First win: 2022
- Last win: 2022
Wins	Top tens	Poles
1	16	0
- Statistics up to date as of July 1, 2026.

Cole Moore (born June 3, 1997) is an American professional stock car racing driver who is currently competing in various Road Racing Series such as Trans-Am Series driving the No. 99 TA2 and TAC cars full-time. He last competed full-time in the ARCA Menards Series West, driving the No. 99 Chevrolet SS/Toyota for Bill McAnally Racing. He has also previously competed in the ARCA Menards Series. Moore now races in the Trans Am series. Participating in TA2 and TA Cup.

== Racing career ==
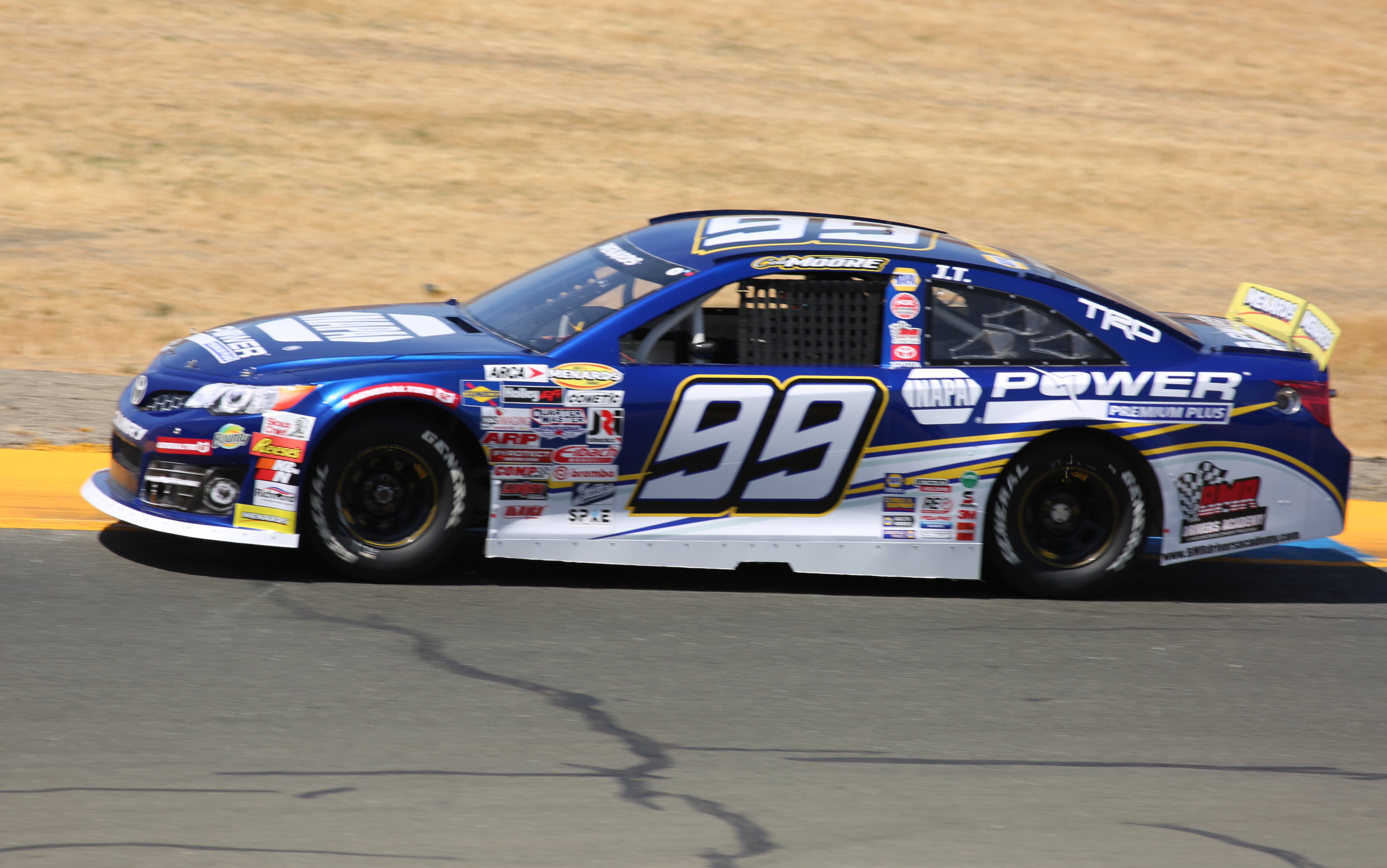
Moore in the West Series race at Sonoma in 2021

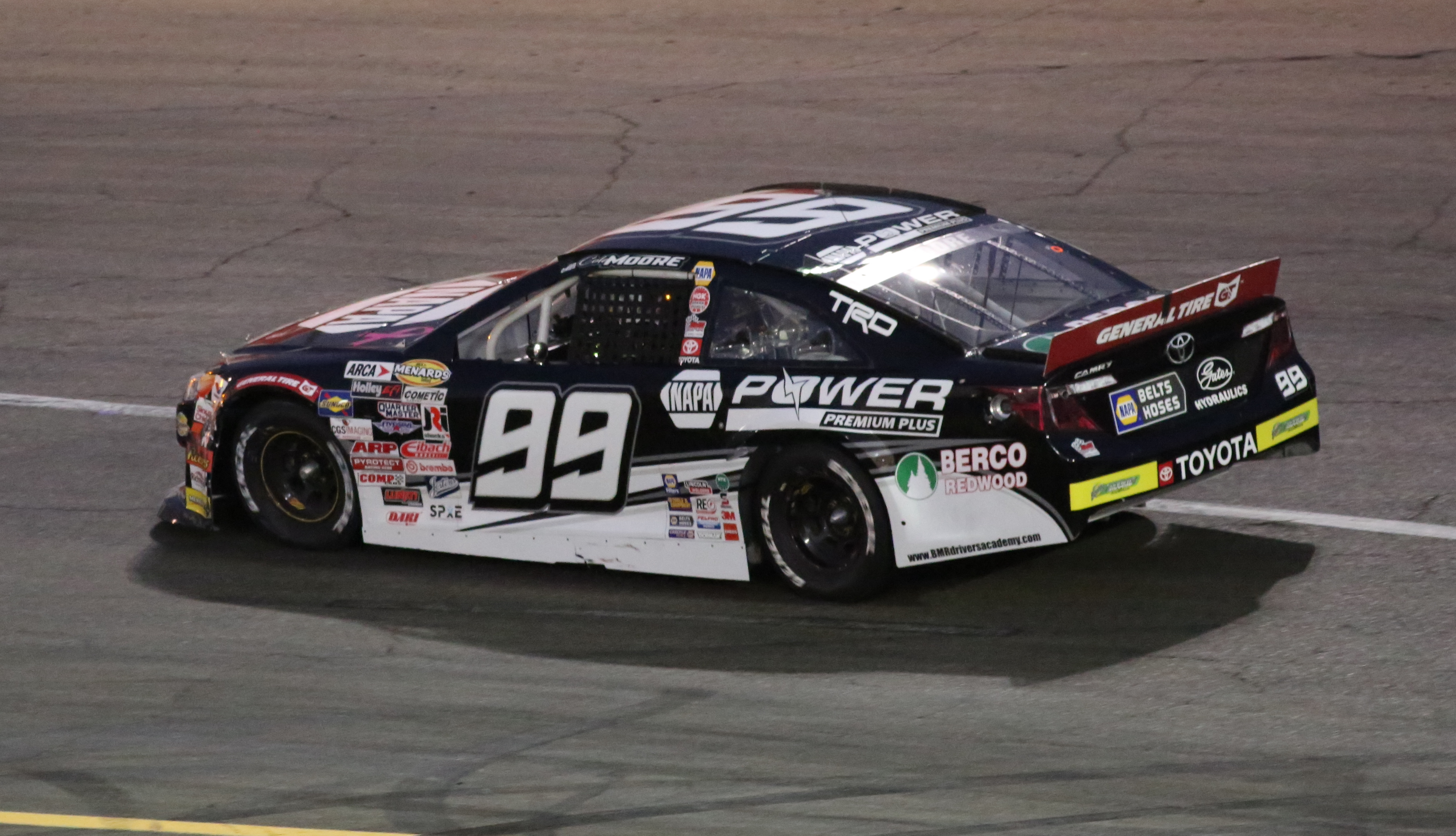
Moore in the West Series race at All-American Speedway in 2021

Moore made his NASCAR K&N Pro Series West (now the ARCA Menards Series West) debut in 2015, running four races at All-American Speedway, his home-track located in Roseville, California, with Bill McAnally Racing. He finished 19th. Moore ran six races the following year at Colorado National Speedway, Stateline Speedway, Evergreen Speedway, Utah Motorsports Campus (2), and All-American Speedway. His best finish was seventh at Roseville. Moore ran one race in 2017, finishing seventh at Roseville.

Moore did not race in the series again until 2021 when he returned to BMR to run full-time in their No. 99 car. He collected six top-tens and four top-fives and led 114 laps, including 79 at Roseville. His best finishes were fourth at both Sonoma Raceway and Colorado National Speedway. That year, Moore made his ARCA Menards Series debut, running in the combination race with the West Series at Phoenix Raceway, finishing twelfth. At the end of the year, Moore won the 2021 ARCA Menards Series West Rookie of the Year award.

In 2022, Moore ran another full season for BMR in the West Series in their No. 99 car. He won his first race in the series at All-American Speedway in October. Also, in that same race, he competed against his father, John Moore, for the first time in the West Series, who drove an additional car for BMR, the No. 27. Moore would finish the season third in the final standings.

On February 2, 2023, it was announced that Moore would only be running part-time for BMR in the West Series in 2023 and he would share their No. 19 car with Eric Johnson Jr., although he would end up not running any races for the team that year.

== Motorsports career results ==
=== ARCA Menards Series ===
(key) (Bold – Pole position awarded by qualifying time. Italics – Pole position earned by points standings or practice time. * – Most laps led. ** – All laps led.)

ARCA Menards Series results
Year	Team	No.	Make	1	2	3	4	5	6	7	8	9	10	11	12	13	14	15	16	17	18	19	20	AMSC	Pts	Ref
2021	Bill McAnally Racing	99	Toyota	DAY	PHO; 12	TAL	KAN	TOL	CLT	MOH	POC	ELK	BLN	IOW	WIN	GLN	MCH	ISF	MLW	DSF	BRI	SLM	KAN	93rd	32	
2022	Bill McAnally Racing	99	Chevy	DAY	PHO; 11	TAL	KAN	CLT	IOW	BLN	ELK	MOH	POC	IRP	MCH	GLN	ISF	MLW	DSF	KAN	BRI	SLM	TOL	86th	33	

==== ARCA Menards Series West ====
ARCA Menards Series West results
Year	Team	No.	Make	1	2	3	4	5	6	7	8	9	10	11	12	13	14	AMSWC	Pts	Ref
2015	Bill McAnally Racing	20	Toyota	KCR	IRW	TUS	IOW	SHA	SON	SLS	IOW	EVG	CNS	MER	AAS; 19	PHO		61st	25	
2016	Bill McAnally Racing	20	Toyota	IRW	KCR	TUS	OSS	CNS; 14	SON	SLS; 14	IOW	EVG; 10	DCS	UMC; 18	UMC; 17	MER	AAS; 7	17th	184	
2017	Bill McAnally Racing	20	Toyota	TUS	KCR	IRW	IRW	SPO	OSS	CNS	SON	IOW	EVG	DCS	MER	AAS; 7	KCR	44th	37	
2021	Bill McAnally Racing	99	Toyota	PHO; 12	SON; 4	IRW; 5	CNS; 4	IRW; 6	PIR; 12	LVS; 6	AAS; 5	PHO; 10						3rd	436	
2022	Bill McAnally Racing	99	Chevy	PHO; 11	IRW; 2	KCR; 3			IRW; 2	EVG; 4		AAS; 1	LVS; 14	PHO; 14				3rd	563	
2022	Bill McAnally Racing	99	Toyota				PIR; 11	SON; 12			PIR; 4							3rd	563	

^{*} Season still in progress
