= Factory Five Racing =

American automobile company

Factory Five Racing, Inc.
- Company type: Private
- Industry: Automotive
- Founded: 1995
- Headquarters: Wareham, Massachusetts, USA
- Key people: David Smith, Owner/President
- Products: Kit cars
- Revenue: ▲$7.5 Million USD (2007)
- Number of employees: 350
- Website: www.factoryfive.com

Factory Five Racing, Inc. (F.F.R.) is an American automobile company that designs and manufactures assembly kits, chassis, bodies and related components for replicars and sports cars.

== Current models ==
The "kit cars" are designed and manufactured by Factory Five and are usually sold as components to private customers. They are not pre-assembled by Factory Five, as they are intended to be assembled by the purchaser or by a professional third party.

=== Roadster ===
The original FFR Roadster, styled to resemble an AC Cobra, was based on the concept of using running gear from a single modern donor vehicle, the high-performance Mustang. The Mustang running gear was chosen for a number of reasons, but mostly because of high performance relative to cost and ready availability of parts through dealers. The earlier Mustang 302 V-8 and the 427 V-8 is exactly the same block that powered the original vintage AC Cobra and Ford GT-40 to World Championships in the 60’s. Over a million Mustangs were built between 1987 and 2004 and the performance after-market for these parts is well established. The Roadster is also available with a 289 body which includes changes to the front openings, doors, hood scoop, and roll bar, among others.

The donor car path is not the only way to build an FFR Roadster. The remaining mechanical parts can be purchased new or used from a variety of sources. The kit has been modified to accommodate a variety of engine, drive-train, and suspension choices. Over half of the Factory Five customers today build their kit using engine/drivetrain parts from a donor Mustang, whereas the remainder elect to buy all new parts or a combination thereof. Jim Youngs, the founder and editor of Kit Car Builder, says the Factory Five Cobra is the country's bestselling kit car.

During 2010 the Mark IV version of the Roadster was released, 15 years after the Mark I was born.

In 2025 the Mark V roadster with a new chassis that can accommodate larger drivers and Coyote 5.0 engines better was made available.

=== Challenge Series Racer ===
The design for the Challenge Racer started with a stock Factory Five Roadster. Changes were made to make it an effective “Open-Track” vehicle designed with road racing in mind. The welded-in SCCA-derived cage and frame design means it is safer than bolt-on equipment and the Mustang running gear means it is affordable.

The car is commonly referred to as the Spec Racer and qualifies for National FFR-NASA Spec Series. Also held each year is a 2-day National race to determine the overall series champion. The Nationals are held each year in conjunction with the FFR National Owners Group Meet. Regardless of whether or not the car is raced in any regional series, anyone who owns a Challenge car is eligible to attend the annual championship race and vie for the national title.

=== Type 65 Coupe ===
The FFR Type 65 Coupe, styled to resemble a Daytona Coupe, is the culmination of four years of engineering and design work. The first prototype was completed in the spring of 2000 and production of chassis kits began September 2000. In its design, all the FFR racing components are included in a package suitable for street use. The Coupe is a rendition of the famous world championship coupes of the 60’s, but with modern technologies.

=== GTM Supercar ===
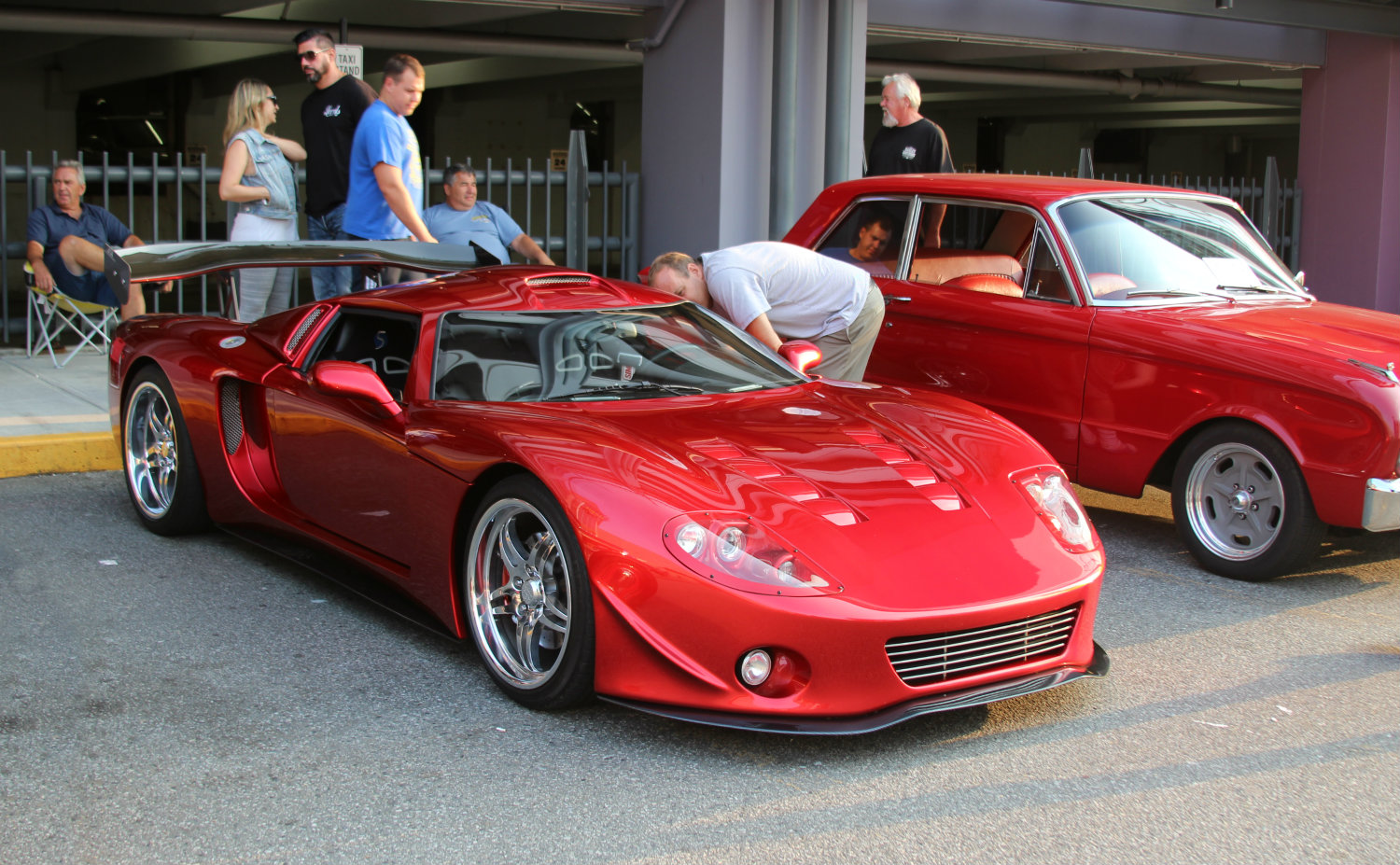
FFR GTM

The GTM is a V-8 powered, mid-engined rear wheel drive car with a composite body shell and an aluminum and a unique proprietary steel tube frame chassis. The car uses GM high-performance parts such as engine, drivetrain, suspension components with four-corner coil-over shocks, performance brakes, and a transaxle. The GTM is light and aerodynamic, with excellent weight distribution and precise race-car handling/braking derived from the Chevrolet Corvette C5. In the September 2007 issue, Car and Driver reviewed a prototype GTM LS7 and their testing achieved 0-60 mph in 3.0 seconds and 1/4 mile in 11 seconds at 134 mph, beating the tested speeds of European Supersportscars like the Ferrari 599 GTO, Porsche Carrera GT, Lamborghini Murcielago SV, Ferrari Enzo and several other considerably more expensive exotic production vehicles. The car, i.e. chassis, and all components are engineered in-house and can be assembled to the finished completed car by the customer. Items such as A/C, power windows, and a complete interior are available and make the vehicle suitable for general use as a daily driver on public roads in the United States, where the vehicle can be regularly registered.

The GTM chassis is also used as a prototype and testbed for the Capstone CMT-380 vehicle, a hybrid gas turbine/electric sportscar with potentially 500-mile range.

=== '33 Hot Rod ===
The '33 Hot Rod is a vehicle styled to look like a '33 Ford street rod but has a modern chassis.

=== Project 818 ===
The Project 818 vehicle kit is available to order, is lightweight (the 818 stands for the 818 kg (1800 lb) curb weight), affordable (under 15,000 US dollars for the completed kit), and based on proven Subaru boxer engine architecture. In 2016 a face lifted version of the 818 became available. There are 3 models available, an open top street model (818s) with available soft top, a track oriented version with integrated roll-bar (818r), and a hard-top coupe (818c). "Grassroots Motorsports" awarded the 818 an Editors’ Choice award for 2013. This car's power to weight ratio makes it a phenomenal contender with many supercars on the market.

=== XTF Pre-Runner Truck ===
The XTF Pre-Runner Truck is a body kit for the Ford F-150.

== Suspended Production Models ==
=== Spyder GT ===
Production of the Spyder GT kit was suspended on October 15, 2006, for reasons of production capacity for the GTM and its slow sales. There were 39 cars sold, including the preproduction and showroom cars.

The chassis is based on the FFR Type 65 Coupe.
