= John Moore (racing driver) =

American racing driver (born 1963)

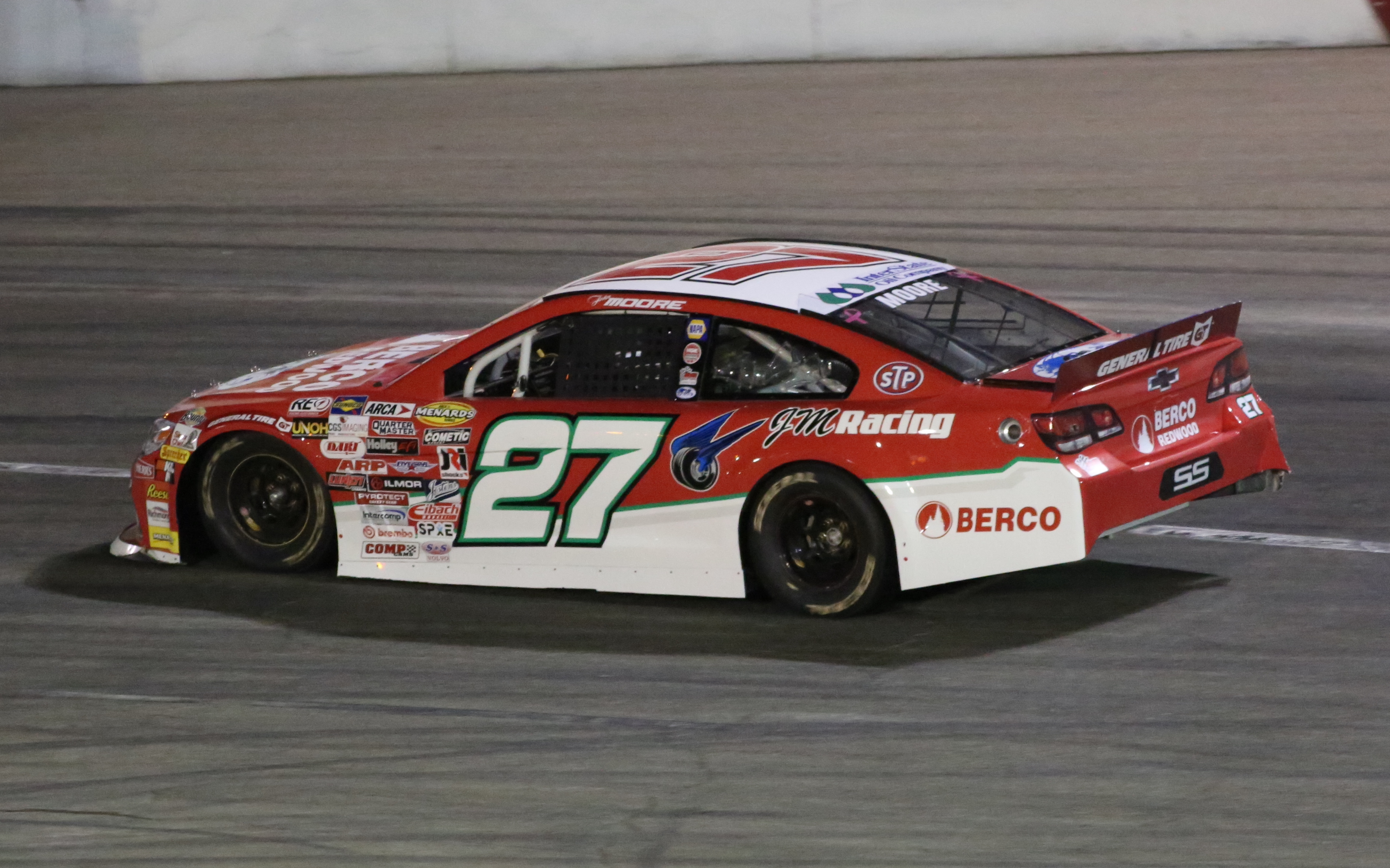
- Moore's No. 27 car at All American Speedway in 2022
- Born: August 27, 1963 (age 63); Tracy, California, U.S.

ARCA Menards Series West career
- 9 races run over 7 years
- Best finish: 26th (2004)
- First race: 2003 NAPA Auto Parts 200 (Stockton)
- Last race: 2024 MMI Oil Workers 150 (Bakersfield)
Wins	Top tens	Poles
0	3	0
- Statistics up to date as of April 21, 2024.

John Moore (born August 27, 1963) is an American professional stock car racing driver who last competed part-time in the ARCA Menards Series West, driving the No. 88 Ford for Naake-Klauer Motorsports.

== Racing career ==
In 2003, Moore made his debut in the NASCAR West Series at Stockton 99 Speedway, driving the No. 12 Chevrolet for Bill McAnally Racing, where he started fifteenth and finished two laps down in eleventh. He then made two more starts for McAnally the following year at Mesa Marin Speedway and Stockton, getting a best finish of seventh in the latter event, before making a start for Tony Oddo in the No. 25 Ford when the series returned to Stockton, where he finished in fifth place. Moore made another start for Oddo in 2005, finishing fourteenth at Stockton, and made a start for Thompson Motorsports in the No. 61 Chevrolet, once again at Stockton, where he finished eleventh. Afterwards, He did not make another start in the series for the next nine years, where he competed in series such as the SRL Spears Southwest Tour Series, the Pacific Challenge Series, and the Westcar Late Model Series, a series where he finished sixth in the points in 2009.

In 2015, Moore made a return to the now NASCAR K&N Pro Series West at All American Speedway, driving the No. 38 Ford for Mike Holleran, where he finished seventeenth after starting nineteenth. It was also during this year that he won the Pacific Challenge Series championship, getting one win at Stockton and eight top-ten finishes.

In 2022, it was revealed that Moore would return to the now ARCA Menards Series West at Roseville, driving the No. 27 Chevrolet for Bill McAnally Racing, where he served as a teammate for his son, Cole Moore. After starting thirteenth, he went on to finish on the lead lap in eighth, while the younger Moore earned his first career win.

In 2024, it was revealed that Moore would return to the West Series, driving the No. 88 Ford for Naake-Klauer Motorsports at Kevin Harvick's Kern Raceway. After placing eleventh in the lone practice session, he qualified in fifteenth and finished four laps down in fourteenth position.

== Personal life ==
Moore is the father of Cole Moore, who has also previously competed in the West Series, finishing third in the points in 2022.

== Motorsports results ==
=== ARCA Menards Series West ===
(key) (Bold – Pole position awarded by qualifying time. Italics – Pole position earned by points standings or practice time. * – Most laps led. ** – All laps led.)

ARCA Menards Series West results
Year	Team	No.	Make	1	2	3	4	5	6	7	8	9	10	11	12	13	AMSWC	Pts	Ref
2003	Bill McAnally Racing	12	Chevy	PHO	LVS	CAL	MAD	TCR	EVG	IRW	S99; 11	RMR	DCS	PHO	MMR		46th	130	
2004	Bill McAnally Racing	20	Chevy	PHO	MMR; 15	CAL	S99; 7	EVG	IRW								26th	419	
2004	Tony Oddo	25	Ford							S99; 5	RMR	DCS	PHO	CNS	MMR	IRW	26th	419	
2005	Tony Oddo	25	Ford	PHO	MMR	PHO	S99; 14	IRW	EVG	S99	PPR	CAL	DCS	CTS	MMR		49th	121	
2006	Thompson Motorsports	61	Chevy	PHO	PHO	S99	IRW	SON	DCS	IRW	EVG	S99; 11	CAL	CTS	AMP		56th	130	
2015	Mike Holleran	38	Ford	KCR	IRW	TUS	IOW	SHA	SON	SLS	IOW	EVG	CNS	MER	AAS; 17	PHO	59th	27	
2022	Bill McAnally Racing	27	Chevy	PHO	IRW	KCR	PIR	SON	IRW	EVG	PIR	AAS; 8	LVS	PHO			54th	36	
2024	Naake-Klauer Motorsports	88	Ford	PHO	KER; 13	PIR	SON	IRW	IRW	SHA	TRI	MAD	AAS	KER	PHO		57th	31	
