= Capstone Green Energy =

US gas turbine manufacturer

Capstone Green Energy Corporation
- Formerly: Capstone Turbine; Nomac Energy Systems
- Type: Public
- Traded as: OTCQX: CGRNQ (since 2023); Nasdaq: CGRN (prior to 2023)
- Industry: Industrial Electrical Equipment
- Founded: 1988; 38 years ago
- Headquarters: Van Nuys, California, United States
- Key people: Vince Canino (president & CEO)
- Products: Microturbines
- Revenue: $82.8 Million (Period Ending 31-Mar-18)
- Number of employees: 171
- Website: www.capstonegreenenergy.com

Capstone Green Energy Corporation, formerly Capstone Turbine Corporation, was incorporated in 1988 as a California based gas turbine manufacturer that specializes in microturbine power along with heating and cooling cogeneration systems. Key to the Capstone design is its use of air bearings, which provides maintenance and fluid-free operation for the lifetime of the turbine and reduces the system to a single moving part. This also eliminates the need for any cooling or other secondary systems. The Capstone microturbine is a versatile and dispatchable technology that is fuel flexible and scalable enough to fit a variety of applications.

== History ==
Former logo

The company was founded in 1998 as NoMac Energy Systems in Tarzana, a portmanteau of the surnames of its two founders, James Noe and Robin Mackay. The pair were formerly employed by AlliedSignal, but left to develop their ideas for a microturbine generator. Early investors included NASA, Ford Motor Company, and Sevin Rosen Funds (in April 1993, led by Benjamin M. Rosen).

Harold A. Rosen, Ben's older brother, was one of the first to notice the fledgling turbine company, after a friend working at NASA gave him a paper describing the technology. The Rosens acquired NoMac and renamed it Capstone. In addition, the Rosens founded a separate company, Rosen Motors, in May 1993 to develop a prototype turbine-flywheel automobile power train using the microturbine, but Rosen Motors closed in November 1997 because no major manufacturer was willing to invest further.

After Rosen Motors folded, Capstone continued to develop its microturbine as a source of electricity to facilitate distributed generation, spurred by investments from computer technology executives including Ben Rosen, Paul Allen, and Bill Gates, although Capstone did partner with Richard Hilleman to build the CMT-380 hybrid electric supercar, which debuted at the Los Angeles Auto Show in 2009. It uses the GTM chassis from Factory Five Racing. In distributed generation applications, microturbines often are part of combined heat and power installations, recovering exhaust heat to boost overall thermal efficiency.

On April 22, 2021, the company announced it was changing its name to Capstone Green Energy. In July 2021, the company provided the first hydrogen fueled microturbine to Austrian engineering and construction firm Innovametall Stahl-Und Metallbau to be used at their powder coating facility in Freistadt.

Capstone is a member of the United States Environmental Protection Agency's Combined Heat and Power Partnership, which is committed to improving the efficiency of the nation's energy infrastructure and reducing emissions of pollutants and greenhouse gases. A DQS-Certified ISO 9001:2015 and ISO 14001:2015 certified company, Capstone is headquartered in the Los Angeles area with sales and/or service centers in the United States, Latin America, Europe, Middle East and Asia.

On September 28, 2023, Capstone Green Energy declared Chapter 11 bankruptcy.

== Products ==
The company sells microturbine generators for electrical power generation, cogeneration, biogas-fueled renewable energy, and hybrid vehicle power. Capstone offers microturbines with output power ratings ranging from 30 to 1,000 kW (40 to 1,341 hp). Multiple turbines can be combined with Capstone's Advanced Power Server (APS) for greater output.

Capstone microturbines have generated some interest as a range extender for hybrid electric vehicles, in particular hybrid electric work trucks. Their light weight, small size and quick starting time make them ideal as "instant-on" backup power to recharge the main batteries. An example of a Capstone-powered hybrid vehicle is the Capstone CMT-380, equipped with a 30 kW gas turbine generator running on diesel that recharges Li-Poly batteries when necessary. The CMT-380 has a proposed range of 80 mi (130 km) on battery alone, but when combined with the microturbine that range is pushed to more than 500 mi (800 km).

=== Design ===
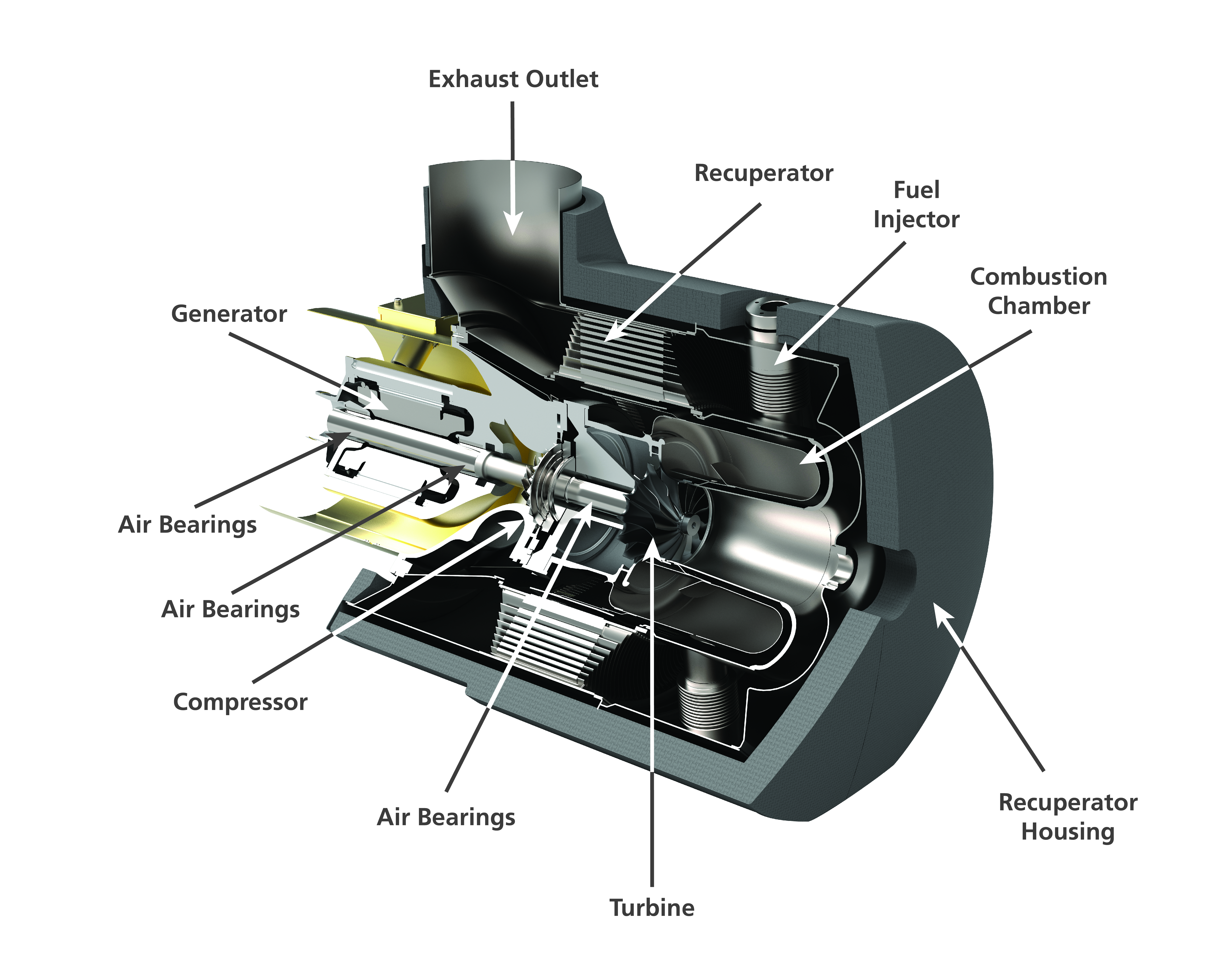
Cross-section cutaway illustration of Capstone C65 (65kW) microturbine

Capstone turboshaft diagram

The Capstone microturbine is a turboshaft engine with a single coupled shaft carrying the compressor, turbine, and generator. Idealized gas turbine operation is represented by the Brayton cycle. In this machine, intake air is drawn over the generator (G) to cool it and is pressurized in the compressor (C); the compressed air then passes through a non-mixing exhaust-to-air heat exchanger called a recuperator (R). The recuperator uses exhaust heat to preheat the intake combustion air, which increases the overall efficiency of the microturbine.

In the next step of the cycle, the compressed, preheated air is fed to a combustor (X) where it is mixed with the fuel and burned. The heated combustion exhaust gas is expanded through a turbine (T), driving the rotation of the central shaft. Since the turbine, compressor and generator are mounted on a single central shaft, the rotation of the turbine produces electrical power while simultaneously drawing in air to maintain the overall process. The faster the shaft spins in the magnetic field, the greater the electrical output power. Output power conditioning is obtained using inverter based power electronics.

== Sponsorship ==
For the NTT IndyCar Series, Capstone has sponsored:

- Driver Colton Herta (2019–20)
- Driver James Hinchcliffe (2021)

== See also ==
- Distributed generation
- Brayton cycle
- Cogeneration (Combined Heat and Power, or CHP)
- Trigeneration (Combined Cooling Heating and Power, or CCHP)
