= Serena Perrone =

American artist

- Born: 1979; St. Louis, Missouri, US
- Education: Southern Illinois University; Rhode Island School of Design (MFA)

Serena Perrone (born 1979) is an American artist and printmaker. Her work is included in the collections of the Whitney Museum of American Art and the Metropolitan Museum of Art.

== Career ==
Perrone was born in St. Louis Missouri and spent summers in Italy. Her family is art involved; her father was a professor, her mother was an art teacher, and her step father was a cinematographer. She earned her Bachelor of Fine Arts at Southern Illinois University. She would later earn her Masters of Fine Arts in Printmaking from the Rhode Island School of Design. After graduation, she moved to Philadelphia. Once in Philadelphia, Perrone began working with the Cade Tompkins Projects which helped her art work gain attention.

In 2016, Perrone was hired by PrattMWP College of Art and Design and later worked as a visiting critic at the Rhode Island School of Design. In the following years, she began teaching courses at Rhode Island School of Design and was nominated for a Pew Fellowship. In 2017, she was one of three artists selected to display a solo exhibit at The Print Center in Philadelphia.

== Collections ==
Her work is included in the collections of the Whitney Museum of American Art, the Metropolitan Museum of Art, and Cleveland Museum of Art. In 2018, the Metropolitan Museum of Art acquired Perron's print titled "A Volcano Pilgrim in Exchange for Fire."
