= Perrone Robotics =

Perrone Robotics is a robotics software company based out of Charlottesville, Virginia and formed in 2001. The company formed Team Jefferson as a low budget side project in 2004 to build an autonomous robotic dune buggy for participation in the 2005 DARPA Grand Challenge. The company was at the 2006 JavaOne conference with their robotic dune buggy 'Tommy' and received a Duke Award in the emerging technology category for Tommy & MAX.

The company has reformed Team Jefferson to participate in the 2007 DARPA Urban Challenge with partners such as Fair-Isaac Corporation, Sun Microsystems, and the University of Virginia.

The CEO spoke at the Consumer Electronics Show (CES) 2007 in Las Vegas describing the emerging consumer robotics market and how to 'roboticize' consumer products .
