= Ben Spies =

American motorcycle racer (born 1984)

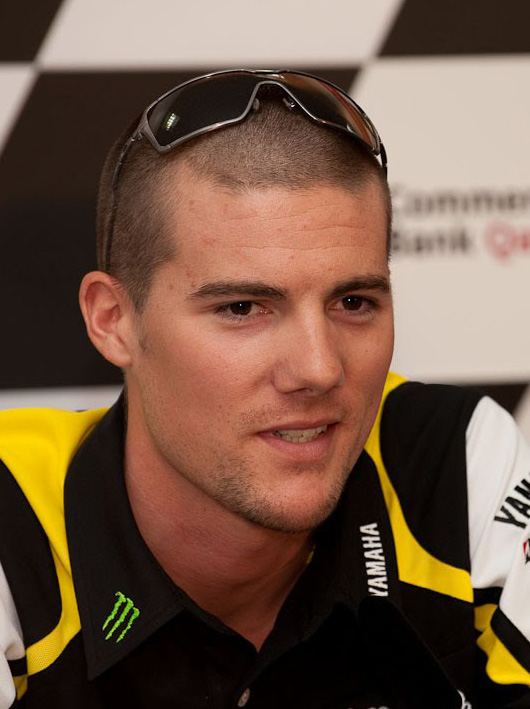
- Spies at the 2010 Qatar Grand Prix
- Born: July 11, 1984 (age 42); Memphis, Tennessee, United States
Motorcycle racing career statistics
MotoGP World Championship
Active years	2008–2013
Manufacturers	Suzuki (2008); Yamaha (2009–2012); Ducati (2013)
Championships	0
2013 championship position	21st (9 pts)
Starts / Wins / Podiums / Poles / F. laps / Points; 55 / 1 / 6 / 1 / 1 / 478
Superbike World Championship
Active years	2009
Manufacturers	Yamaha
Championships	1 (2009)
2009 championship position	1st (462 pts)
Starts / Wins / Podiums / Poles / F. laps / Points; 28 / 14 / 17 / 11 / 6 / 462
AMA Superbike Championship / MotoAmerica
Active years	2000-2008
Championships	3
Starts / Wins / Podiums / Poles / F. laps / Points; 0 / 0 / 0 / 0 / 0 / 0

Ben Patrick Spies (/ˈbɛn ˈspiːz/; born July 11, 1984), is an American team principal for a MotoAmerica Supersport (600cc) professional motorcycle road racing team who previously was a racer himself. He was sometimes nicknamed "Elbows" due to his riding style, in which his elbows protruded outward. Spies won the AMA Superbike Championship for Yoshimura Suzuki in 2006, and successfully defended it in 2007 and 2008.

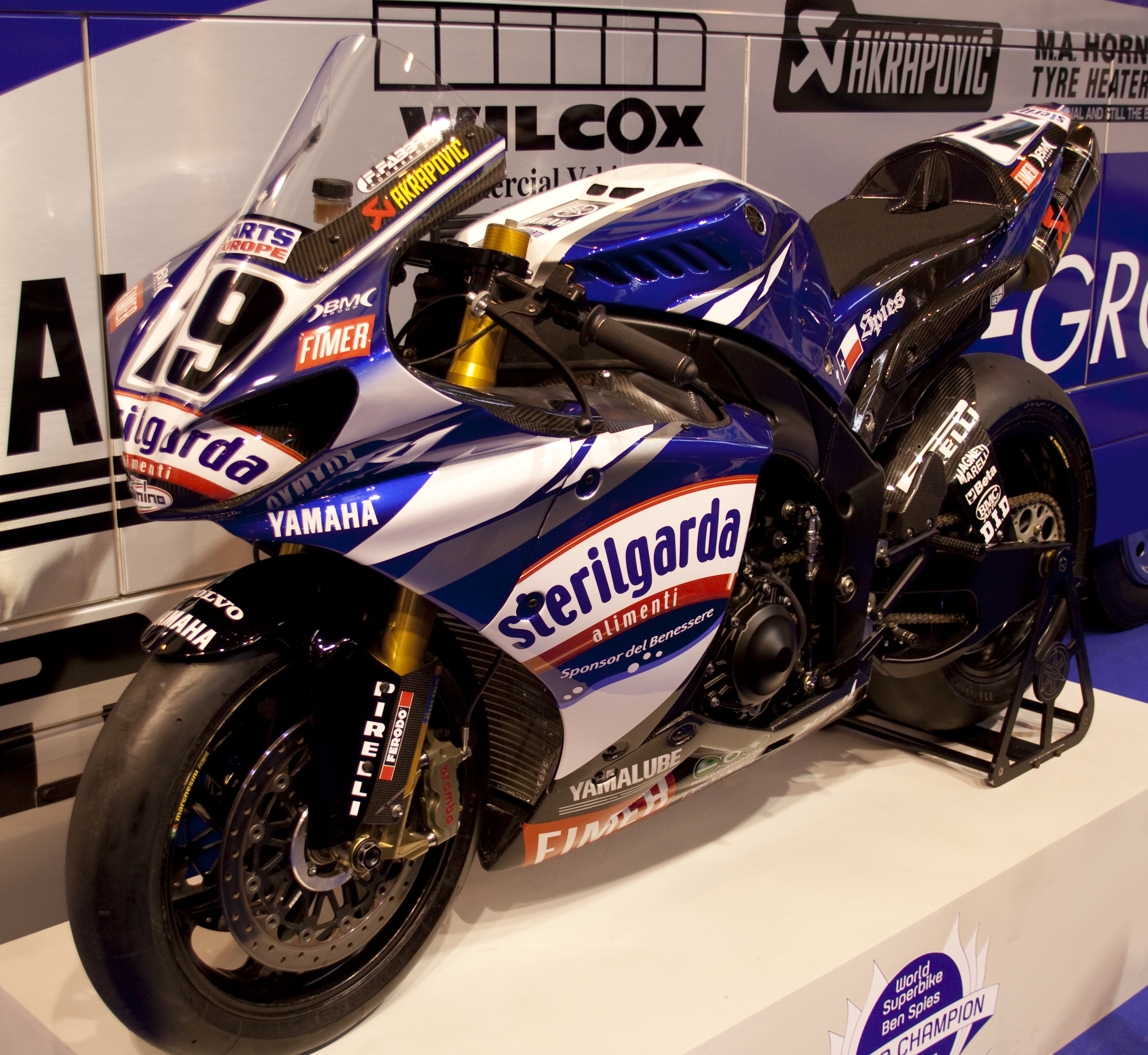
Spies' 2009 World Championship Yamaha R1 Superbike

For 2009, Spies raced in the Superbike World Championship series for the Yamaha Italia team; winning the championship in his rookie year by six points over rival Noriyuki Haga. He started racing on Yamaha YSR50cc bikes with the Central Motorcycle Roadracing Association in Texas when he was eight years old. On October 26, 2013, Spies announced his retirement from motorcycle racing after two debilitating crashes left him with permanent shoulder injuries. On October 17, 2023, Graham Rahal, owner of Ducati Indianapolis and Ducati Cleveland dealerships, named Spies team principal for the dealership-owned Supersport (600cc sportbike) team Rahal Ducati Moto.

== Career ==
=== Early career ===
Born in Memphis, Tennessee, and growing up in Longview, Texas, Spies started riding motorcycles at the age of five and racing with CMRA at the age of eight in 1993. In 1994, he won a YSR championship followed by an 80cc championship the following season. At the age of 12, he started riding 125 Grand Prix bikes, traveling to WERA races outside of Texas. At the age of 14, Spies started riding 600s, winning more championships. He signed with Suzuki in 2000 at the age of 15, and began his AMA career.

=== AMA Superbike Championship ===
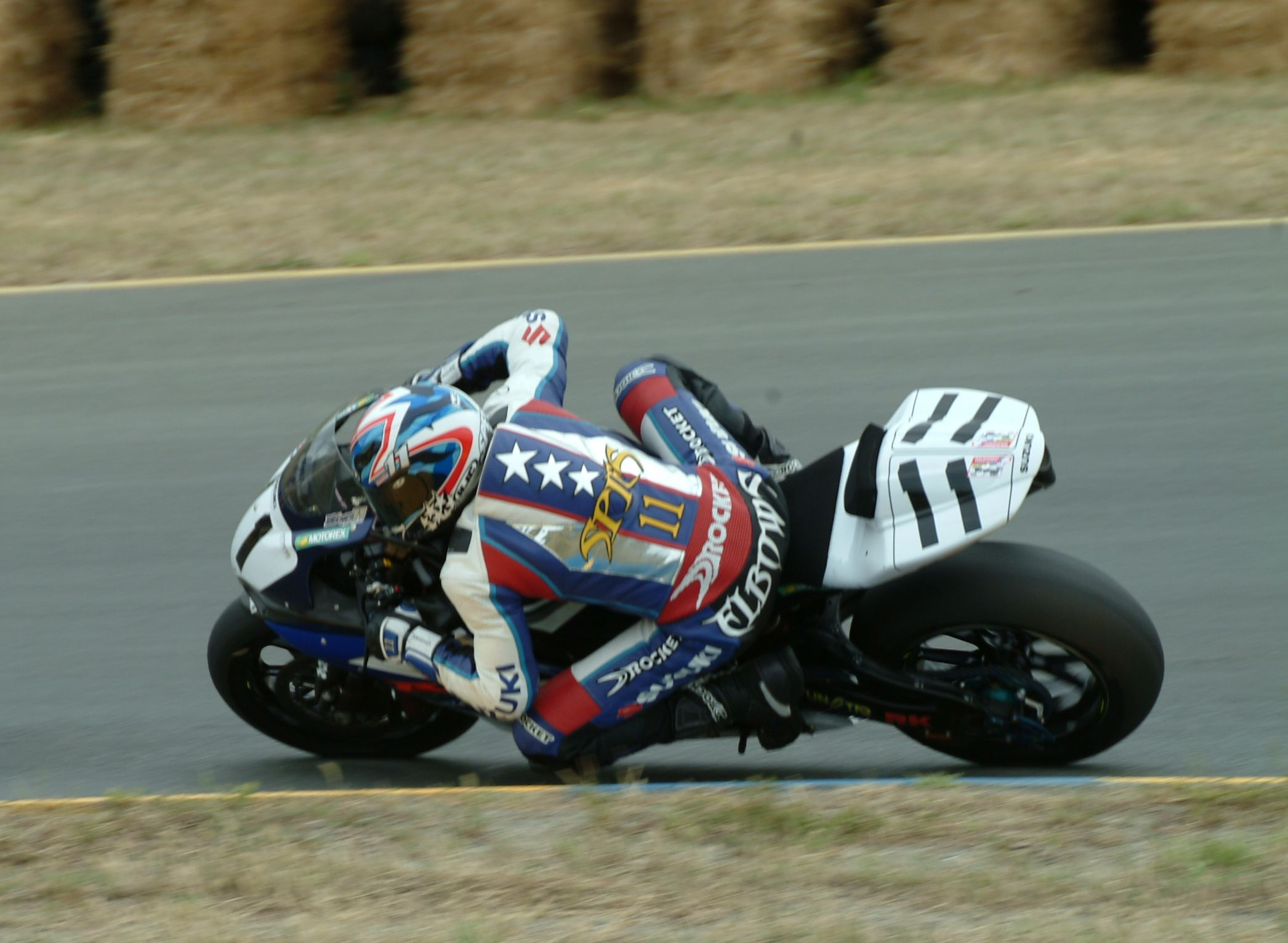
Spies at Sonoma Raceway in 2005 riding Suzuki.

In 2000, Spies raced with the Valvoline Suzuki team. He took a season-best fifth-place finish at the Pikes Peak International Raceway round of the AMA 750 Supersport series, won the Nicky Hayden Award (then known as the AMA Horizon Award; it was renamed in 2017) for road racing. In late 2000, he qualified on the front row for his debut in the AMA Supersport Championship series.

Again with Valvoline Suzuki in 2001, Spies won the Pikes Peak round of the AMA 750 SuperStock Championship, and took four additional series podium finishes. American Suzuki then removed him from the team and placed in with Attack Suzuki.

For 2002, Spies joined the Attack Suzuki team, paired with Jason Pridmore. He earned three top-five finishes in AMA Supersport, and four top-five finishes in AMA Formula Xtreme. He was troubled by a knee injury for much of the season.

Now with American Suzuki team, Spies won the 2003 AMA Formula Xtreme Championship with five wins and two additional podium finishes. He also contested the AMA Supersport series, earning a win at Road Atlanta and taking two additional podium finishes. His best AMA Superbike result this year was seventh-place at Daytona Intl Speedway

Again with American Suzuki team in 2004, Spies raced in the AMA Supersport Championship, earning a win at Infineon Raceway and taking two additional series podium finishes. He earned wins in the AMA Superstock Championship races at California Speedway and Road Atlanta, and earned two additional podium finishes in the series.

In 2005. Spies won the AMA Superbike race at California Speedway and earned 13 additional podium finishes. He was runner-up for the AMA Superbike title, and raced in AMA Supersport, earning five top-five finishes.

Spies joined the Yoshimura Suzuki team in 2006. He won the AMA Superbike Championship title with ten wins and seven additional podium finishes. Spies took six successive wins early in the 2006 season, and went on to win the title over his teammate, six-time series Champion Mat Mladin, by 649 points to 641. In total, he took seven poles and 17 podiums, and lead the most laps ten times. Spies also raced in select AMA Supersport events, earning a podium finish at Mazda Raceway Laguna Seca.

2007 produced the tightest championship battle in the history of the series, with Spies winning a second AMA Superbike Championship by a single point over Mladin. Spies collected seven wins and 12 additional podium finishes during the season. He captured Superbike pole position at nine events, and also won the AMA Superstock title with seven wins and seven pole positions.

In 2008, Spies won his third straight AMA Superbike Championship to become only the fourth rider in the history of the series to win the title three consecutive times (after Reg Pridmore, Fred Merkel and Mat Mladin, who accomplished the feat twice). This included an AMA Superbike record of seven successive wins.

=== MotoGP World Championship (2008–2009) ===
Spies started as a wild-card in place of injured Loris Capirossi at the British GP on June 22, 2008. An outing that saw him qualify in eighth on the grid and finish in 14th place, scoring his first MotoGP points. This was in addition to two pre-planned rides at both U.S. rounds. He tested for Rizla Suzuki at Indianapolis on July 2, 2008, in preparations for the new U.S. Grand Prix. Top-ten finishes followed at both Mazda Raceway Laguna Seca in eighth and in sixth at Indianapolis.

Spies was not offered a full-time ride by Suzuki for 2009 with all the success he gave to Suzuki and had an option year in his contract. The decision was made by Mel Harris who now is no longer with Suzuki. Masayuki Itoh retired because of the departure of Spies.

=== Superbike World Championship ===
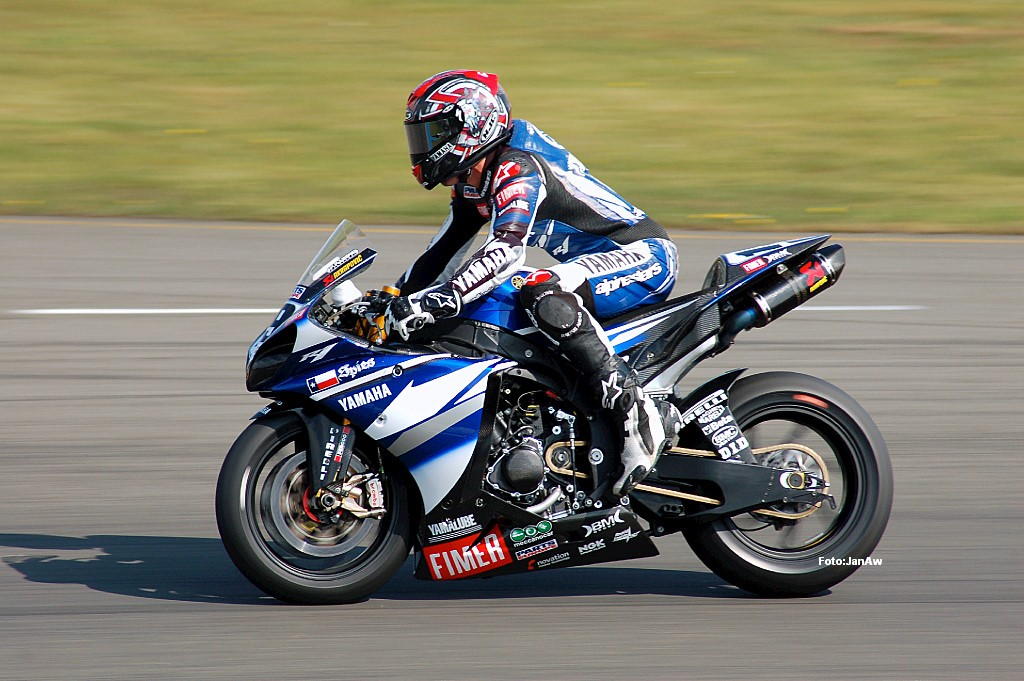
Spies at the Assen round of the 2009 season.

On October 1, 2008, it was confirmed that Spies would join the Superbike World Championship for the 2009 season, riding for the factory Yamaha Italia team. He took pole position for his very first race meeting. He ran off the track on the first lap in race one (recovering to finish sixteenth despite a second incident) but was victorious in race 2 to become the first American to win a WSBK race since Colin Edwards in 2002.

Spies further impressed the world motorcycle racing community by winning both races of the second round in Losail, Qatar. En route, he again secured pole, the subsequent race wins, the fastest lap and the outright circuit lap record.

Spies made history on May 30, 2009, at Miller Motorsports Park. Winning his seventh consecutive pole position during Saturday's Superpole qualifying, Spies broke the long-standing record of six consecutive poles set in 1991 by fellow Texan Doug Polen. The pole set a number of records, including most consecutive pole positions in a season, most poles to start a season, and most in a row by a rookie. On October 24, 2009, at Portimão Circuit in Portugal, he set a new record securing his 11th pole of his rookie season. This was despite having no previous experience at the majority of circuits on the WSBK calendar.

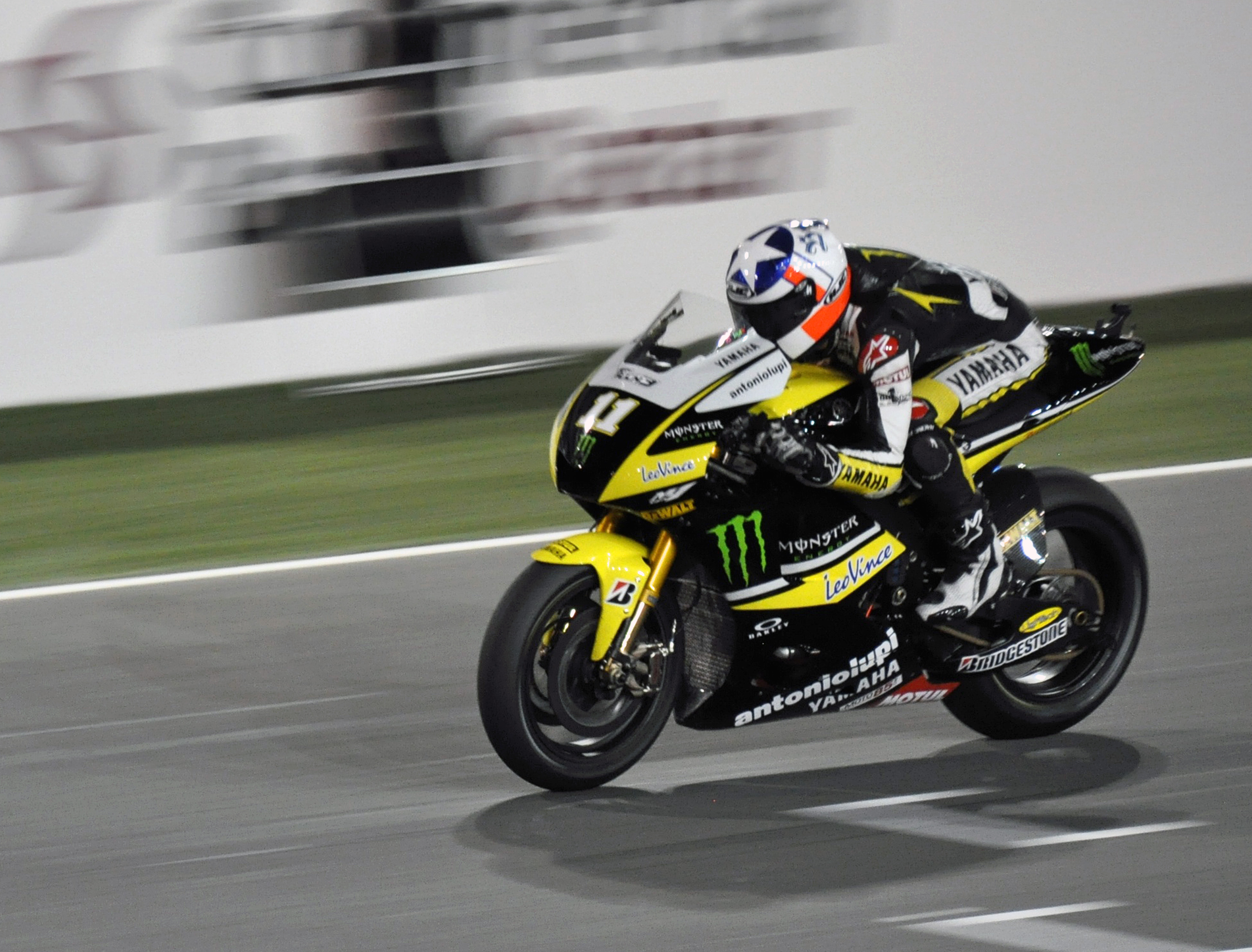
Spies at the 2010 Qatar Grand Prix.

On October 25, 2009, at the final round of the Championship at Portimão, Spies was crowned the 2009 Superbike World Champion after winning Race One, in conjunction with a fall from title rival Noriyuki Haga, and a solid fifth place in Race 2.

=== MotoGP World Championship (2010–2013) ===
==== 2009 ====
On October 1, 2009, Yamaha officially confirmed that Spies would replace James Toseland at the Yamaha Tech 3 team for the 2010 MotoGP Championship. Two days later it was confirmed that Spies would ride as a wildcard for the Yamaha Sterilgarda team, in the final MotoGP race of the season at Valencia in November,. Spies began the race from 12th place, but made his way through the pack, finishing in seventh place.

==== 2010 ====
Spies started the season with fifth place at Losail, his best ever on a MotoGP bike, before retiring in the next two races with a mechanical problem at Jerez and a crash at Le Mans. Spies took his first MotoGP podium at Silverstone in Great Britain, taking a third-place finish. Spies took second place from pole at home at Indianapolis. He finished the 2010 MotoGP season in sixth place, securing Rookie of the Year honours.

==== 2011 ====
Spies moved to the factory Yamaha Motor Racing Team alongside 2010 champion Jorge Lorenzo, replacing the Ducati bound Valentino Rossi in 2011. He started the season with a sixth-place finish in Qatar, before crashing out of the next two races at Jerez and Estoril. After another sixth place in France, Spies achieved his first podium of the season with a third place in Catalunya, having held off Repsol Honda's Andrea Dovizioso. Spies suffered another crash at the British Grand Prix, crashing out at Turn 1 in wet conditions. Two weeks later, Spies narrowly missed out on pole position for the Dutch TT in Assen; he qualified second, just 0.009 seconds behind Gresini Racing's Marco Simoncelli. Spies and teammate Lorenzo jumped ahead of Simoncelli at the start, and took the first two placings into the first corner. Simoncelli and Lorenzo later made contact and both riders fell, giving Spies a 2.5-second lead after the first lap. Spies extended his advantage to almost eight seconds by the end of the race, and took his first MotoGP win in the process.

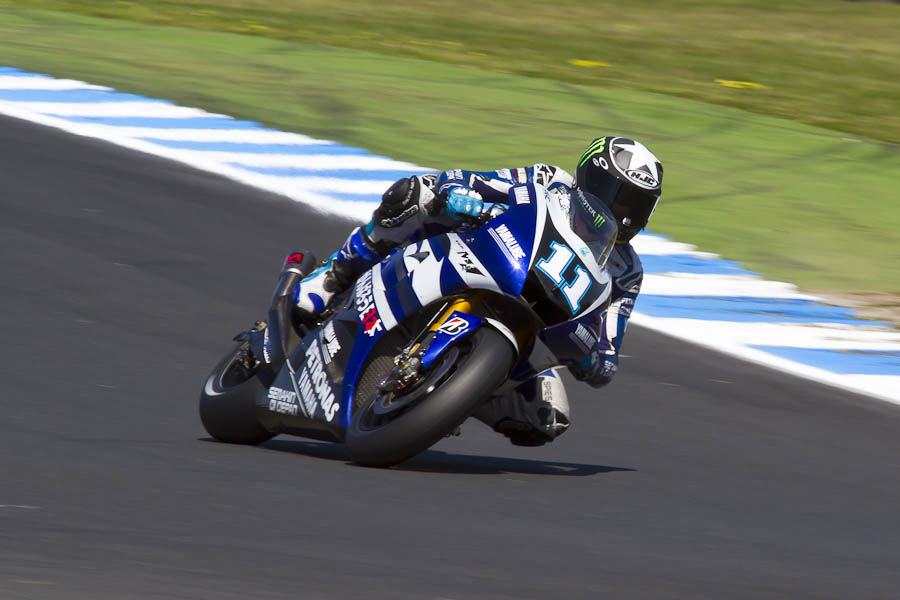
Spies at the 2011 Australian Grand Prix at Phillip Island; he did not start the race after suffering a concussion and rib tearing after a crash in qualifying.

After his win at Assen, Spies finished each of the following five races in the top five, taking fourth places at Mugello and Laguna Seca, fifth places at the Sachsenring and Brno, and concluding the streak with his third podium of the season – a third place – at the Indianapolis Grand Prix. Having qualified second, Spies made contact on the first lap with Dovizioso, and as a result, fell to as low as ninth place before making several late braking moves to progress through the order. Sixth at Misano was followed by fifth at Aragón and another sixth at Motegi helped to maintain his fifth place in the championship. At the Australian Grand Prix, Spies crashed during qualifying at over 250 km/h (155 mph), sliding into the gravel, resulting in a concussion and tearing to his ribs, but managed to qualify seventh on the grid. However, his injuries forced him to pull out on race morning, and were also a factor in his similar withdrawal from the Malaysian Grand Prix, having qualified 16th out of the 17 riders and after two further practice crashes. Spies finished the season with a second-place finish in Valencia, missing out on victory at the line, to Casey Stoner by just 0.015 seconds, having capitalised on a previous error by Stoner to take the lead.

Spies' biography "Taking It To The Next Level" was published by David Bull Publishing and was launched at the Indianapolis Grand Prix on August 26, 2011.

==== 2012 ====
Spies remained with the factory Yamaha team into the 2012 season, again partnering Jorge Lorenzo. Spies placed eleventh in the first two races of the season in Qatar and Jerez, before taking his first top ten with eighth in Portugal. After missing out on the points at Le Mans, Spies finished tenth in Catalunya before three top-five finishes in succession; he took a fifth-place finish at Silverstone before a pair of fourths at Assen and the Sachsenring. He finished eleventh at Mugello, falling 119 points behind teammate Lorenzo in the standings. He retired from each of the following three races, before taking a pair of fifth-place finishes at the Grands Prix in San Marino and Aragon. An issue with his bike's brakes forced a retirement in Japan, while he crashed out in Malaysia; he suffered injuries in the accident which ruled him out for the rest of the season. He finished tenth in the final championship standings, with 88 points.

On July 24, it was announced that Spies would leave the factory Yamaha team at the end of the 2012 season, making way for the returning Valentino Rossi. On September 12, it was announced that Spies would remain in MotoGP for the 2013 season, joining the satellite Pramac Racing Ducati squad as part of a two-rider team alongside Moto2 graduate Andrea Iannone.

==== 2013 ====
After finishing the first two races of the season with the Pramac Ducati squad, Spies was out of many races due to injury. He made an attempt to return at Indianapolis, but crashed and suffered more injuries, ruling him out for most of the rest of the season. However, on October 26, during the Japanese GP weekend at Motegi, he announced his retirement from racing due to his injuries.

=== Rahal Ducati Moto team principal ===
On October 18, 2023, Ducati Indianapolis announced Spies as team principal for the 2024 MotoAmerica season as a Supersport class team. The team will be owned by INDYCAR star Graham Rahal, who owns two Ducati dealerships. The team will be a four-motorcycle team in 2026, with one Superbike and three Supersport Ducati motorcycles.

== Career statistics ==
=== All-time statistics ===
Years	Series		Poles	Races	Podiums	Wins	2nd place	3rd place	Fastest laps	Titles
All-time	World Superbike		11	28	17	14	2	1	6	1
All-time	MotoGP		1	55	6	1	2	3	1	0
All-time	AMA Superbike		43	74	68	29	31	8	30	3
All-time	AMA Superstock		11	27	12	9	3	0	8	1
All-time	AMA Formula Xtreme		1	10	7	5	0	2	8	1
All-time	AMA Supersport		2	28	4	1	2	1	2	0
Seasons	Series	Bike	Poles	Races	Podiums	Wins	2nd place	3rd place	Fastest laps	Position
2013	MotoGP	Ducati GP13	0	2	0	0	0	0	0	21st
2012	MotoGP	Yamaha YZR-M1	0	16	0	0	0	0	0	10th
2011	MotoGP	Yamaha YZR-M1	0	16	4	1	1	2	1	5th
2010	MotoGP	Yamaha YZR-M1	1	17	2	0	1	1	0	6th
2009	World Superbike	Yamaha YZF-R1	11	28	17	14	2	1	6	**1st**
2009	MotoGP	Yamaha YZR-M1	0	1	0	0	0	0	0	20th
2008	AMA Superbike	Suzuki GSXR-1000	15	19	18	10	8	0	9	**1st**
2008	MotoGP	Suzuki GSV-R	0	3	0	0	0	0	0	19th
2007	AMA Superbike	Suzuki GSXR-1000	15	19	19	8	11	0	9	**1st**
2007	AMA Superstock	Suzuki GSXR-1000	7	8	7	7	0	0	6	**1st**
2006	AMA Superbike	Suzuki GSXR-1000	13	19	17	10	6	1	9	**1st**
2006	AMA Supersport	Suzuki GSXR-600	0	7	1	0	0	1	0	14th
2005	AMA Superbike	Suzuki GSXR-1000	0	17	14	1	6	7	1	**2nd**
2005	AMA Supersport	Suzuki GSXR-600	0	10	0	0	0	0	0	4th
2004	AMA Supersport	Suzuki GSXR-600	2	11	3	1	2	0	2	4th
2004	AMA Superstock	Suzuki GSXR-1000	4	11	4	2	2	0	2	5th
2003	AMA Formula Xtreme	Suzuki GSXR-1000	1	10	7	5	0	2	1	**1st**
2003	AMA Supersport	Suzuki GSXR-600	0	11	3	1	0	2	0	9th
2003	AMA Superbike	Suzuki GSXR-1000	0	5	0	0	0	0	0	54th
2002	AMA Formula Xtreme	Suzuki GSXR-1000	0	10	0	0	0	0	0	6th
2002	AMA Supersport	Suzuki GSXR-600	0	10	0	0	0	0	0	9th
2002	AMA Superstock	Suzuki GSXR-600	0	8	1	0	1	0	0	55th

=== MotoAmerica Superstock Championship ===
==== By year ====
Year	Class	Bike	1	2	3	4	5	6	7	8	9	10	11	Pos	Pts
2004	Superstock	Suzuki	**DAY**; 7	**FON**; 1	INF; 6	**BAR**; 22	PPK; 7	RAM; 5	BRD; 6	LAG; 7	M-O; 2	**RAT**; 1	VIR; 2	5th	297
2007	Superstock	Suzuki	DAY; 1	BAR; 4	FON; 1	INF; 1	RAM; 1	MIL; 1	LAG	OHI	VIR; 1	RAT; 1	LAG	1st	292

=== AMA Supersport Championship ===
==== By year ====
Year	Class	Bike	1	2	3	4	5	6	7	8	9	10	11	Pos	Pts
2004	Supersport	Suzuki	DAY; Ret	FON; 2	INF; 1	BAR; 7	PPK; 7	RAM; 6	BRD; 6	LAG; 4	M-O; 2	RAT; 5	VIR; 7	4th	279
2005	Supersport	Suzuki	DAY; 4	BAR; 10	FON; 6	INF; 5	PPK; 7	RAM; 5	LAG; 4	M-O; 5	VIR; 26	RAT; 7		4th	231
2006	Supersport	Suzuki	DAY; 4	BAR	FON	INF; C	RAM; 5	MIL	LAG; 3	OHI; 7	VIR	RAT	OHI	14th	106

=== AMA SuperBike Championship ===
Year	Class	Team	1	2		3		4		5		6		7	8		9		10		11	Pos	Pts
Year	Class	Team	R1	R1	R2	R1	R2	R1	R2	R1	R2	R1	R2	R1	R1	R2	R1	R2	R1	R2	R1	Pos	Pts
2005	SuperBike	Suzuki	DAY; 3	BAR; 3	BAR; 3	FON; 1	FON; 2	INF; 4	INF; 3	PPK; 3		RAM; 4	RAM; 2	LAG; 4	M-O; 2	M-O; 3	VIR; 2	VIR; 3	RAT; 2	RAT; 2		2nd	514
2006	SuperBike	Suzuki	DAY; 2	BAR; 1	BAR; 1	FON; 1	FON; 1	INF; 1	INF; 1	RAM; 2	RAM; 2	MIL; 1	MIL; 3	LAG; 1	OHI; 1	OHI; 1	VIR; 2	VIR; 4	RAT; 2	RAT; 2	OHI; 7	1st	649
2007	SuperBike	Suzuki	DAY; 1	BAR; 2	BAR; 2	FON; 1	FON; 2	INF; 2	INF; 2	RAM; 2	RAM; 1	MIL; 1	MIL; 1	LAG; 1	OHI; 2	OHI; 2	VIR; 2	VIR; 2	RAT; 2	RAT; 2	LAG; 1	1st	652
2008	SuperBike	Suzuki	DAY; 2	BAR; 11	BAR; 2	FON; 1	FON; 1	INF; 1	INF; 1	MIL; 1	MIL; 1	RAM; 1	RAM; 2	LAG; 2	OHI; 2	OHI; 2	VIR; 1	VIR; 1	RAT; 2	RAT; 1	LAG; 2	1st	652

=== Grand Prix motorcycle racing ===
==== Races by year ====
(key) (Races in bold indicate pole position, races in italics indicate fastest lap)

Year	Class	Bike	1	2	3	4	5	6	7	8	9	10	11	12	13	14	15	16	17	18	Pos	Pts
2008	MotoGP	Suzuki	QAT	ESP	POR	CHN	FRA	ITA	CAT	GBR; 14	NED	GER	USA; 8	CZE	RSM	INP; 6	JPN	AUS	MAL	VAL	19th	20
2009	MotoGP	Yamaha	QAT	JPN	SPA	FRA	ITA	CAT	NED	USA	GER	GBR	CZE	INP	RSM	POR	AUS	MAL	VAL; 7		20th	9
2010	MotoGP	Yamaha	QAT; 5	SPA; Ret	FRA; Ret	ITA; 7	GBR; 3	NED; 4	CAT; 6	GER; 8	USA; 6	CZE; 4	**INP**; 2	RSM; 6	ARA; 5	JPN; 8	MAL; 4	AUS; 5	POR; DNS	VAL; 4	6th	176
2011	MotoGP	Yamaha	QAT; 6	SPA; Ret	POR; Ret	FRA; 6	CAT; 3	GBR; Ret	NED; 1	ITA; 4	GER; 5	USA; 4	CZE; 5	INP; 3	RSM; 6	ARA; 5	JPN; 6	AUS; DNS	MAL; C	VAL; 2	5th	176
2012	MotoGP	Yamaha	QAT; 11	SPA; 11	POR; 8	FRA; 16	CAT; 10	GBR; 5	NED; 4	GER; 4	ITA; 11	USA; Ret	INP; Ret	CZE; Ret	RSM; 5	ARA; 5	JPN; Ret	MAL; Ret	AUS	VAL	10th	88
2013	MotoGP	Ducati	QAT; 10	AME; 13	SPA	FRA	ITA; DNS	CAT	NED	GER	USA	INP; DNS	CZE	GBR	RSM	ARA	MAL	AUS	JPN	VAL	21st	9

=== Superbike World Championship ===
==== Races by year ====
(key) (Races in bold indicate pole position, races in italics indicate fastest lap)

Year	Bike	1		2		3		4		5		6		7		8		9		10		11		12		13		14		Pos	Pts
Year	Bike	R1	R2	R1	R2	R1	R2	R1	R2	R1	R2	R1	R2	R1	R2	R1	R2	R1	R2	R1	R2	R1	R2	R1	R2	R1	R2	R1	R2	Pos	Pts
2009	Yamaha	**AUS**; 16	**AUS**; 1	**QAT**; 1	**QAT**; 1	**SPA**; Ret	**SPA**; 2	**NED**; 1	**NED**; Ret	**ITA**; 15	**ITA**; 1	**RSA**; 3	**RSA**; Ret	**USA**; 1	**USA**; 1	SMR; 1	SMR; 9	**GBR**; 1	**GBR**; 1	**CZE**; Ret	**CZE**; 1	GER; 1	GER; 2	ITA; 4	ITA; 5	**FRA**; 1	**FRA**; 4	**POR**; 1	**POR**; 5	**1st**	**462**

== See also ==
- List of AMA Superbike champions
- List of Superbike World champions

== Bibliography ==
- Lawrence, Larry (September 1, 2011). Ben Spies: Taking It to the Next Level. Edited by Tom Morgan, Foreword by Kevin Schwantz. Phoenix, Arizona: David Bull Publishing. ISBN 978-1-935007-15-9.
- Wheeler, Andrew (December 14, 2012). Ben Spies: The Visual Biography. Spies Companies. ISBN 978-0615714349.

Preceded by Jamie Hacking	AMA Superstock Champion; 2007	Succeeded by Aaron Yates
Preceded by Jason Pridmore	AMA Formula Extreme Champion; 2003	Succeeded by Miguel Duhamel
