= Aaron Yates =

Aaron Yates may refer to:

- Tech N9ne (Aaron Yates, born 1971), American rapper
- Aaron Yates (motorcyclist) (born 1973), American motorcycle racer
