= Jamie Hacking =

British motorcycle racer (born 1971)

- Born: 30 June 1971 (age 55); Oswaldtwistle, Lancashire, England
Motorcycle racing career statistics
MotoGP World Championship
Active years	2008
Manufacturers	Kawasaki
Starts / Wins / Podiums / Poles / F. laps / Points; 1 / 0 / 0 / 0 / 0 / 5
Superbike World Championship
Active years	1998–1999, 2009
Manufacturers	Yamaha, Kawasaki
Starts / Wins / Podiums / Poles / F. laps / Points; 10 / 0 / 0 / 0 / 0 / 32

Jamie Alexander Hacking (born 30 June 1971), nicknamed The Hacker, is a three-time AMA National champion British professional motorcycle racer who has spent his entire career in the United States.

== Early years ==
At the age of five, Hacking's father Brian gave him a small motorbike for Christmas, on which he learned the basics. At the age of nine, his family moved to Spartanburg, South Carolina for Brian's work. By the age of 12, he began competing in local motocross events and won a BMX bicycle championship. He progressed on dirt and eventually began to receive support from Kawasaki and Honda. By 1994, he turned his attention to road racing and competed in some CCS events and later progressed on to the WERA series.

== Professional career ==
=== AMA Supersport & Superbike (1997-2009) ===
Hacking entered the AMA Supersport Championship series in 1997 with a sponsorship with Kinko's Kawasaki and managed to qualify on the pole in Phoenix. In 1998, he moved on to Yamaha with a full factory ride where he finished third at Daytona on his debut, and won the AMA Superbike Rookie of the Year despite missing much of the year through injury. In 1999, he took two AMA Supersport wins plus several Superbike podium finishes.

In 2001, Hacking joined the crack Yoshimura Suzuki team, and took his first AMA Superbike race win, at Road Atlanta. In 2003, he lost his ride with Suzuki in the Superbike class and returned to Supersport with Yamaha. This proved to be one of his best years, winning the AMA Supersport Championship with four wins and three further podiums. He narrowly failed to defend the title in 2004, also finishing as runner-up in the AMA Superstock class. In 2006, he won both the Supersport and Superstock AMA classes. 2007 saw him move to Monster Energy Kawasaki where he would contend the Superbike and Supersport classes. He would finish the season sixth in Superbike and runner up in Supersport. In 2008, he scored six podium finishes in AMA Superbike, and briefly threatened the supremacy of Yoshimura's Ben Spies and Mat Mladin.

=== Moto GP (2008) ===
Hacking raced the works Kawasaki MotoGP bike during the US Grand Prix at Mazda Raceway Laguna Seca, deputising for an injured John Hopkins. He finished a very reasonable 11th.

=== Superbike World Championship (2009) ===
Hacking also raced in the Superbike World Championship in 2009 for the Paul Bird Motorsport Kawasaki to replace injured rider Makoto Tamada. Finishing his first race in an impressive seventh place at Miller Motorsports Park. This earned Hacking the next two races at Misano and Donington Park although he failed to score in both.

== Personal life ==
Hacking currently resides outside of Charlotte, North Carolina. He lives there with his wife and two children. Hacking also owns a car performance business, JHR Performance.

== Career statistics ==
=== MotoAmerica Superstock Championship ===
==== By year ====
Year	Class	Bike	1	2	3	4	5	6	7	8	9	10	11	Pos	Pts
2004	Superstock	Yamaha	DAY; 2	FON; 3	INF; 1	BAR; 1	PPK; 1	RAM; 24	BRD; 1	LAG; 6	M-O; 11	RAT; 6	VIR; 3	2nd	317
2005	Superstock	Yamaha	DAY; 4	BAR; 4	FON; 2	INF; 2	PPK; 1	RAM	LAG	M-O	VIR	RAT		13th	156
2006	Superstock	Yamaha	DAY; 1	BAR; 2	FON; 2	INF; 1	RAM; 2	MIL; 1	LAG; 1	OHI; 1	VIR; 2	RAT; 1	OHI; 19	1st	363

=== AMA Supersport Championship ===
==== By year ====
Year	Class	Bike	1	2	3	4	5	6	7	8	9	10	11	Pos	Pts
2004	Supersport	Yamaha	DAY; 5	FON; 4	INF; 2	BAR; 4	PPK; 5	RAM; 2	BRD; 4	LAG	M-O	RAT	VIR; 2	8th	233
2005	Supersport	Yamaha	DAY; 2	BAR; 1	FON; 1	INF; 3	PPK; 3	RAM	LAG	M-O	VIR	RAT		12th	166
2006	Supersport	Yamaha	DAY; 2	BAR; 2	FON; 1	INF; C	RAM; 1	MIL; 1	LAG; 1	OHI; 1	VIR; 1	RAT; 1	OHI; 4	1st	360
2007	Supersport	Kawasaki	DAY; 2	BAR; Ret	FON; 1	INF; 2	RAM; 2	MIL; 1	LAG; 4	OHI	VIR; 3	RAT; 2	LAG; 2	2nd	294

=== MotoAmerica SuperBike Championship ===
Year	Class	Team	1	2		3		4		5		6		7	8		9		10		11	Pos	Pts
Year	Class	Team	R1	R1	R2	R1	R2	R1	R2	R1	R2	R1	R2	R1	R1	R2	R1	R2	R1	R2	R1	Pos	Pts
2007	SuperBike	Kawasaki	DAY; Ret	BAR; 7	BAR; 8	FON; 11	FON; 8	INF; 8	INF; 10	RAM; 9	RAM; 2	MIL; 6	MIL; 9	LAG; 6	OHI; Ret	OHI; 3	VIR; 3	VIR; 4	RAT; 3	RAT; 3	LAG; Ret	6th	403
2008	SuperBike	Kawasaki	DAY; 5	BAR; 4	BAR; 21	FON; 6	FON; 7	INF; 3	INF; 3	MIL; 2	MIL; 2	RAM; 3	RAM; 3	LAG; 4	OHI; 3	OHI; 3	VIR; 19	VIR; 5	RAT; 13	RAT; 21	LAG	5th	421

=== Superbike World Championship ===
==== Races by year ====
(key) (Races in bold indicate pole position, races in italics indicate fastest lap)

Year	Bike	1		2		3		4		5		6		7		8		9		10		11		12		13		14		Pos	Pts
Year	Bike	R1	R2	R1	R2	R1	R2	R1	R2	R1	R2	R1	R2	R1	R2	R1	R2	R1	R2	R1	R2	R1	R2	R1	R2	R1	R2	R1	R2	Pos	Pts
2009	Kawasaki	AUS	AUS	QAT	QAT	SPA	SPA	NED	NED	ITA	ITA	RSA	RSA	USA; 7	USA; 19	SMR; 16	SMR; 22	GBR; 21	GBR; Ret	CZE	CZE	GER	GER	ITA	ITA	FRA	FRA	POR	POR	30th	9

=== Grand Prix motorcycle racing ===
==== Races by year ====
(key) (Races in bold indicate pole position, races in italics indicate fastest lap)

Year	Class	Bike	1	2	3	4	5	6	7	8	9	10	11	12	13	14	15	16	17	18	Pos	Pts
2008	MotoGP	Kawasaki	QAT	SPA	POR	CHN	FRA	ITA	CAT	GBR	NED	GER	USA; 11	CZE	RSM	INP	JPN	AUS	MAL	VAL	20th	5
