= 2007 AMA Superbike Championship =

Seasons
- ← 2006 2008 →

The 2007 AMA Superbike Championship is the 32nd season of the AMA Superbike Championship

== Season Calendar ==
No	Date	Round/Circuit	Superstock Race Winner	FX Race Winner	Supersport Race Winner
1	March 7–10	(Florida) Daytona	(United States) Ben Spies	(United States) Steve Rapp	(United States) Roger Lee Hayden
2	April 20–22	(Alabama) Barber	(United States) Aaron Yates	(United States) Josh Hayes	(United States) Josh Hayes
3	April 27–29	(California) Fontana	(United States) Ben Spies	(United States) Josh Hayes	(United States) Jamie Hacking
4	May 18–20	(California) Infineon	(United States) Ben Spies	(United States) Josh Hayes	(United States) Josh Hayes
5	June 1–3	(Wisconsin) Road America	(United States) Ben Spies	(United States) Josh Hayes	(Australia) Aaron Gobert
6	June 22–24	(Utah) Miller	(United States) Ben Spies	(Australia) Aaron Gobert	(United States) Jamie Hacking
7	July 20–22	(California) Laguna Seca	-	(United States) Josh Hayes	(United States) Roger Lee Hayden
8	August 3–5	Mid-Ohio	-	(United States) Josh Hayes	-
9	August 17–19	(Virginia) VIR	(United States) Ben Spies	(United States) Josh Hayes	(United States) Josh Hayes
10	Aug 31-Sept 2	(Georgia (U.S. state)) Road Atlanta	(United States) Ben Spies	(United States) Josh Hayes	(United States) Josh Hayes
11	September 15–16	(California) Laguna Seca	(United States) Jake Holden	(Australia) Aaron Gobert	(United States) Josh Herrin

== Superbike Season Calendar ==
No		Round/Circuit	Date	Pole position	Fastest lap	Winner
1	R1	(Florida) Daytona	March 7–10	(United States) Ben Spies	(United States) Ben Spies	(United States) Ben Spies
2	R1	(Alabama) Barber	April 20–22	(United States) Ben Spies	(Australia) Mat Mladin	(Australia) Mat Mladin
2	R2	(Alabama) Barber	April 20–22	(United States) Ben Spies	(Australia) Mat Mladin	(Australia) Mat Mladin
3	R1	(California) Fontana	April 27–29	(United States) Ben Spies	(United States) Ben Spies	(United States) Ben Spies
3	R2	(California) Fontana	April 27–29	(United States) Ben Spies	(United States) Ben Spies	(Australia) Mat Mladin
4	R1	(California) Infineon	May 18–20	(United States) Ben Spies	(Australia) Mat Mladin	(Australia) Mat Mladin
4	R2	(California) Infineon	May 18–20	(United States) Ben Spies	(United States) Ben Spies	(Australia) Mat Mladin
5	R1	(Wisconsin) Road America	June 1–3	(Australia) Mat Mladin	(Australia) Mat Mladin	(Australia) Mat Mladin
5	R2	(Wisconsin) Road America	June 1–3	(Australia) Mat Mladin	(United States) Ben Spies	(United States) Ben Spies
6	R1	(Utah) Miller	June 22–24	(United States) Ben Spies	(United States) Ben Spies	(United States) Ben Spies
6	R2	(Utah) Miller	June 22–24	(United States) Ben Spies	(Australia) Mat Mladin	(United States) Ben Spies
7	R1	(California) Laguna Seca	July 20–22	(United States) Ben Spies	(Australia) Mat Mladin	(United States) Ben Spies
8	R1	Mid-Ohio	August 3–5	(United States) Ben Spies	(Australia) Mat Mladin	(Australia) Mat Mladin
8	R2	Mid-Ohio	August 3–5	(United States) Ben Spies	(Australia) Mat Mladin	(Australia) Mat Mladin
9	R1	(Virginia) VIR	August 17–19	(Australia) Mat Mladin	(United States) Ben Spies	(Australia) Mat Mladin
9	R2	(Virginia) VIR	August 17–19	(Australia) Mat Mladin	(Australia) Mat Mladin	(Australia) Mat Mladin
10	R1	(Georgia (U.S. state)) Road Atlanta	Aug 31-Sept 2	(United States) Ben Spies	(Australia) Mat Mladin	(Australia) Mat Mladin
10	R2	(Georgia (U.S. state)) Road Atlanta	Aug 31-Sept 2	(United States) Ben Spies	(Australia) Mat Mladin	(Australia) Mat Mladin
11	R1	(California) Laguna Seca	September 15–16	(United States) Ben Spies	(United States) Ben Spies	(United States) Ben Spies

== AMA Superbike ==
=== Rider Standings ===
- Bold results denote pole position
- Italic results denote fastest lap

Pos	Rider	Bike	DAY (Florida)	BAR (Alabama)		FON (California)		INF (California)		RAM (Wisconsin)		MIL (Utah)		LAG (California)	M-O (Ohio)		VIR (Virginia)		RAT (Georgia (U.S. state))		LAG (California)	Pts
Pos	Rider	Bike	DAY (Florida)	R1	R2	R1	R2	R1	R2	R1	R2	R1	R2	LAG (California)	R1	R2	R1	R2	R1	R2	LAG (California)	Pts
1	(Texas) Ben Spies	Suzuki	1	2	2	1	2	2	2	2	1	1	1	1	2	2	2	2	2	2	1	652
2	(Australia) Mat Mladin	Suzuki	11	1	1	2	1	1	1	1	3	2	4	2	1	1	1	1	1	1	2	651
3	(United States) Jake Zemke	Honda	3	6	10	6	5	5	3	5	6	3	2	Ret	8	5	8	6	5	5	5	468
4	(United States) Aaron Yates	Suzuki	11	4	5	7	9	11	14	17	4	8	8	3	4	4	4	3	4	4	3	465
5	(United States) Tommy Hayden	Suzuki	8	5	4	4	4	6	5	3	15	7	6	13	9	9	9	5	10	7	6	454
6	(United States) Jamie Hacking	Kawasaki	Ret	7	8	11	8	8	10	9	2	6	9	6	Ret	3	3	4	3	3	Ret	403
7	(United States) Eric Bostrom	Yamaha	21	8	6	3	3	15	7	6	9	Ret	Ret	9	6	7	6	15	Ret	10	5	362
8	(Canada) Miguel Duhamel	Suzuki	2	3	3	5	6	3	4	4	Ret	5	3	4	3	6	DNS	DNS	DNS	DNS	DNS	360
9	(United States) Jason DiSalvo	Yamaha	6	9	7	9	10	4	6	8	14	9	7	7	7	Ret	7	Ret	Ret	20	7	359
10	(United States) Roger Hayden	Kawasaki	Ret	11	9	8	7	6	25	7	Ret	4	5	DNS	5	8	5	10	6	5	Ret	344
11	(United Kingdom) James Ellison	Honda	9	10	11	Ret	12	9	8	Ret	5	10	11	10	10	11	10	Ret	Ret	8	8	323
12	(United States) Scott Jensen	Suzuki	15	19	17	13	14	Ret	18	15	12	12	13	21	19	15	15	11	11	13	20	285
13	(United States) Jake Holden	Suzuki	7	13	Ret	16	Ret	27	9	10	7	23	Ret	8	DNS	DNS	11	9	9	9	9	267
14	(United States) Matt Lynn	MV Agusta	22	12	Ret	10	22	10	27	Ret	Ret	20	12	25	18	10	13	8	7	11	10	262
15	(Italy) Luca Scassa	MV Agusta	23	Ret	12	19	Ret	13	11	11	Ret	11	10	Ret	11	12	12	7	8	12	Ret	262
16	(United States) David Weber	Suzuki	17	24	18	14	16	16	24	14	11	13	15	17	20	16	DNS	DNS	13	15	21	243
17	(United States) Dominic Jones	Suzuki	19	22	23	15	17	21	16	13	10	15	21	22	12	17	DNS	DNS	15	19	17	233
18	(United States) Dean Mizdal	Suzuki	20	21	21	18	Ret	19	17	Ret	13	16	17	16	17	21	16	13	19	16	16	231
19	(United States) John Haner	Suzuki	16	Ret	15	DNS	DNS	DNS	DNS	16	8	14	14	18	16	13	DNS	DNS	14	Ret	Ret	166
20	(United States) Ben Thompson	Suzuki													Ret	14	14	12	12	14	11	109
Pos	Rider	Bike	DAY (Florida)	BAR (Alabama)		FON (California)		INF (California)		RAM (Wisconsin)		MIL (Utah)		LAG (California)	M-O (Ohio)		VIR (Virginia)		RAT (Georgia (U.S. state))		LAG (California)	Pts

Colour	Result
Gold	Winner
Silver	Second place
Bronze	Third place
Green	Points classification
Blue	Non-points classification
Blue	Non-classified finish (NC)
Purple	Retired, not classified (Ret)
Red	Did not qualify (DNQ)
Red	Did not pre-qualify (DNPQ)
Black	Disqualified (DSQ)
White	Did not start (DNS)
White	Withdrew (WD)
White	Race cancelled (C)
Blank	Did not practice (DNP)
Blank	Did not arrive (DNA)
Blank	Excluded (EX)

Pos.	Pts.	Pos.	Pts.
1	36	16	15
2	32	17	14
3	29	18	13
4	27	19	12
5	26	20	11
6	25	21	10
7	24	22	9
8	23	23	8
9	22	24	7
10	21	25	6
11	20	26	5
12	19	27	4
13	18	28	3
14	17	29	2
15	16	30	1
1pt for Pole Position
1pt for Most Laps Led

== AMA Superstock ==
=== Rider Standings ===
Pos	Rider	Bike	DAY (Florida)	BAR (Alabama)	FON (California)	INF (California)	RAM (Wisconsin)	MIL (Utah)	LAG (California)	M-O (Ohio)	VIR (Virginia)	RAT (Georgia (U.S. state))	LAG (California)	Pts
Pos	Rider	Bike	R1	R1	R1	R1	R1	R1	R1	R1	R1	R1	R1	Pts
1	(United States) Ben Spies	Suzuki	1	4	1	1	1	1			1	1		292
2	(United States) Ben Bostrom	Yamaha	2	3	4	3	4	2			4	2	3	264
3	(United States) Aaron Yates	Suzuki	4	1	3	7	8	3			2	14	2	251
4	(United States) Geoff May	Suzuki	3	7	5	2	2	11			21	3	5	229
5	(United States) Scott Jensen	Suzuki	8	10	8	8	3	6			9	8	13	207
6	(United States) Chris Ulrich	Suzuki	6	8	12	6	12	7			7	10	9	203
7	(United States) Danny Eslick	Suzuki	5	5	6	4	11	5			6	21	8	198
8	(United States) Blake Young	Suzuki	7	6	9	5	10	Ret			5	6	6	194
9	(United States) Jake Holden	Suzuki	Ret	2	2	Ret	6	Ret			3	4	1	183
10	(Venezuela) Robertino Pietri	Suzuki		13	10	9	7	4				12	10	155

== AMA Formula Xtreme ==
=== Rider Standings ===
Pos	Rider	Bike	DAY (Florida)	BAR (Alabama)	FON (California)	INF (California)	RAM (Wisconsin)	MIL (Utah)	LAG (California)	M-O (Ohio)	VIR (Virginia)	RAT (Georgia (U.S. state))	LAG (California)	Pts
Pos	Rider	Bike	R1	R1	R1	R1	R1	R1	R1	R1	R1	R1	R1	Pts
1	(United States) Josh Hayes	Honda	6	1	1	1	1	2		1	1	1		324
2	(United States) Steve Rapp	Kawasaki	1	3	6	3	2	6		9	7	4	3	279
3	(Australia) Aaron Gobert	Honda	Ret	2	2	2	4	1		4	8	Ret	1	247
4	(United States) Larry Pegram	Ducati	24	6	3	5	5	14		5	2	7	2	244
5	(United States) Ben Attard	Kawasaki	2	23	Ret	4	7	4		2	4	2	10	231
6	(United Kingdom) Chaz Davies	Yamaha	4	Ret	4	28	15	3		3	6	6	6	206
7	(United States) Ryan Andrews	Honda	Ret	5	Ret	10	8	19		7	14	8	7	179
8	(United States) Martin Craggill	Ducati	Ret	4	Ret	6	6	Ret		6	3	3	Ret	162
9	(United States) Cory West	Yamaha	Ret	8	Ret	7	9	9		Ret	9	10	8	157
10	(United States) Bobby Fong	Suzuki	12	16	11	9	12	11		13	28	13	Ret	155
11	(United States) Ryan Elleby	Honda	8	7	Ret	Ret	14	8		8	Ret	9	9	154
12	(United States) Tony Meiring	Yamaha	Ret	14	12	11	13	Ret		11	17	12	13	145
13	(Colombia) Martin Cardenas	Suzuki					3	5		Ret	5	5	4	134
14	(Australia) David Anthony	Yamaha	11	10	20	19	11	15			15	Ret	15	132
15	(United States) Tyler McDonald	Yamaha	Ret	21	21	15	16	13		18	21	18		105
16	(United States) Chris Peris	Yamaha						7		10	11	20	5	102
17	(United States) Scott Ryan	Suzuki	Ret	24	17	18	18	Ret		20	23	17	19	92
18	(United States) Chad Herrmann	Suzuki	Ret	12	14	13	10	16						90
19	(United States) Keith Marshall	Suzuki	13	17			28	18		21	20	15		85
20	(United States) C R Gittere	Suzuki	30	27	16	24	25	19		Ret	22	19	22	75

== AMA Supersport ==
=== Rider Standings ===
Pos	Rider	Bike	DAY (Florida)	BAR (Alabama)	FON (California)	INF (California)	RAM (Wisconsin)	MIL (Utah)	LAG (California)	M-O (Ohio)	VIR (Virginia)	RAT (Georgia (U.S. state))	LAG (California)	Pts
Pos	Rider	Bike	R1	R1	R1	R1	R1	R1	R1	R1	R1	R1	R1	Pts
1	(United States) Roger Hayden	Kawasaki	1	5	3	3	3	5	1		4	3	5	297
2	(United States) Jamie Hacking	Kawasaki	2	Ret	1	2	2	1	4		3	2	2	294
3	(United States) Josh Hayes	Honda	5	1	2	1	4	7	Ret		1	1	Ret	260
4	(United States) Steve Rapp	Kawasaki	7	3	4	6	8	10	3		7	7	10	247
5	(United States) Tommy Hayden	Suzuki	3	6	6	10	6	20	10		13	13	8	216
6	(United States) Blake Young	Suzuki	14	9	11	13	5	11	8		15	6	6	212
7	(United States) Josh Herrin	Yamaha	11	2	Ret	5	Ret	6	2		21	5	1	209
8	(United States) Geoff May	Suzuki	9	Ret	7	7	9	2	5		5	28	29	181
9	(United States) Ben Attard	Kawasaki	6	7	Ret	9	11	13	9		Ret	11	4	178
10	(Australia) Aaron Gobert	Honda	Ret	4	Ret	8	1	4	6		19	Ret	7	174
11	(Colombia) Martin Cardenas	Suzuki				12	Ret	3	7		2	4	3	160
12	(United States) Ryan Andrews	Honda	12	16	16	18	20	19	13		14	15	12	155
13	(United Kingdom) Chaz Davies	Yamaha	8	Ret	8	4	7	9	Ret		6	Ret	Ret	145
14	(United States) Danny Eslick	Suzuki	Ret	10	8	11	12	15	12		16	27	Ret	137
15	(United States) Cory West	Yamaha	10	8	10	Ret	Ret	12	14		Ret	9	Ret	123
