= Dave Stanton =

American motorcycle racer

Dave Stanton is an American former AFM, WERA National Endurance, AMA Pro, and Formula USA champion who got injured while riding his Yamaha YZF-R1 during the first lap of the AFM Open Superbike race on June 2, 2013 at Thunderhill Raceway Park, in Willows, California. He was transported to Enloe Medical Center via medevac helicopter and was diagnosed with a punctured lung, a crushed spine and some internal wounds.

== Career statistics ==
=== MotoAmerica Superstock Championship ===
==== By year ====
Year	Class	Bike	1	2	3	4	5	6	7	8	9	10	11	Pos	Pts
2006	Superstock	Suzuki	DAY	BAR	FON	INF; 12	RAM	MIL	LAG	OHI	VIR	RAT	OHI	37th	19
