= 2006 AMA Superbike Championship =

Superbike racing season

Seasons
- ← 2005 2007 →

The 2006 AMA Superbike Championship is the 31st season of the AMA Superbike Championship

== Season Calendar ==
No	Date	Round/Circuit	Superstock Race Winner	FX Race Winner	Supersport Race Winner
1	March 8–11	(Florida) Daytona	(United States) Jamie Hacking	(United States) Jake Zemke	(United States) Roger Lee Hayden
2	April 21–23	(Alabama) Barber	(United States) Aaron Yates	(United States) Jason DiSalvo	(United States) Roger Lee Hayden
3	April 28–30	(California) Fontana	(United States) Jason DiSalvo	(United States) Eric Bostrom	(United States) Jamie Hacking
4	May 19–21	(California) Infineon	(United States) Jamie Hacking	(United States) Eric Bostrom	-
5	June 2–4	(Wisconsin) Road America	(United States) Aaron Yates	(United States) Eric Bostrom	(United States) Jamie Hacking
6	June 16–18	(Utah) Miller	(United States) Jamie Hacking	(United States) Josh Hayes	(United States) Jamie Hacking
7	July 21–23	(California) Laguna Seca	(United States) Jamie Hacking	(United States) Eric Bostrom	(United States) Jamie Hacking
8	August 4–6	Mid-Ohio	(United States) Jamie Hacking	(United States) Eric Bostrom	(United States) Jamie Hacking
9	August 18–20	(Virginia) VIR	(United States) Eric Bostrom	(United States) Eric Bostrom	(United States) Jamie Hacking
10	September 1–3	(Georgia (U.S. state)) Road Atlanta	(United States) Jamie Hacking	(United States) Josh Hayes	(United States) Jamie Hacking
11	Sept 29-Oct 1	Mid-Ohio	(United States) Jason DiSalvo	(United States) Josh Hayes	(United States) Roger Lee Hayden

== Superbike Season Calendar ==
No		Round/Circuit	Date	Pole position	Fastest lap	Winner
1	R1	(Florida) Daytona	March 8–11	(Australia) Mat Mladin	(United States) Ben Spies	(Australia) Mat Mladin
2	R1	(Alabama) Barber	April 21–23	(United States) Ben Spies	(United States) Ben Spies	(United States) Ben Spies
2	R2	(Alabama) Barber	April 21–23	(United States) Ben Spies	(Australia) Mat Mladin	(United States) Ben Spies
3	R1	(California) Fontana	April 28–30	(United States) Ben Spies	(United States) Ben Spies	(United States) Ben Spies
3	R2	(California) Fontana	April 28–30	(United States) Ben Spies	(United States) Ben Spies	(United States) Ben Spies
4	R1	(California) Infineon	May 19–21	(United States) Ben Spies	(United States) Ben Spies	(United States) Ben Spies
4	R2	(California) Infineon	May 19–21	(United States) Ben Spies	(United States) Ben Spies	(United States) Ben Spies
5	R1	(Wisconsin) Road America	June 2–4	(Australia) Mat Mladin	(United States) Ben Spies	(Australia) Mat Mladin
5	R2	(Wisconsin) Road America	June 2–4	(Australia) Mat Mladin	(Australia) Mat Mladin	(Australia) Mat Mladin
6	R1	(Utah) Miller	June 16–18	(United States) Ben Spies	(United States) Jake Zemke	(United States) Ben Spies
6	R2	(Utah) Miller	June 16–18	(United States) Ben Spies	(United States) Jake Zemke	(United States) Jake Zemke
7	R1	(California) Laguna Seca	July 21–23	(United States) Ben Spies	(United States) Tommy Hayden	(United States) Ben Spies
8	R1	Mid-Ohio	August 4–6	(United States) Ben Spies	(United States) Ben Spies	(United States) Ben Spies
8	R2	Mid-Ohio	August 4–6	(United States) Ben Spies	(United States) Ben Spies	(United States) Ben Spies
9	R1	(Virginia) VIR	August 18–20	(Australia) Mat Mladin	(Australia) Mat Mladin	(Australia) Mat Mladin
9	R2	(Virginia) VIR	August 18–20	(Australia) Mat Mladin	(Australia) Mat Mladin	(Australia) Mat Mladin
10	R1	(Georgia (U.S. state)) Road Atlanta	September 2–4	(United States) Ben Spies	(Australia) Mat Mladin	(Australia) Mat Mladin
10	R2	(Georgia (U.S. state)) Road Atlanta	September 2–4	(United States) Ben Spies	(Australia) Mat Mladin	(Australia) Mat Mladin
11	R1	Mid-Ohio	Sept 29-Oct 1	(United States) Ben Thompson	(Australia) Mat Mladin	(Australia) Mat Mladin

== AMA Superbike ==
=== Rider Standings ===
Pos	Rider	Bike	DAY (Florida)	BAR (Alabama)		FON (California)		INF (California)		RAM (Wisconsin)		MIL (Utah)		LAG (California)	M-O (Ohio)		VIR (Virginia)		RAT (Georgia (U.S. state))		M-O (Ohio)	Pts
Pos	Rider	Bike	R1	R1	R2	R1	R2	R1	R2	R1	R2	R1	R2	R1	R1	R2	R1	R2	R1	R2	R1	Pts
1	(United States) Ben Spies	Suzuki	2	1	1	1	1	1	1	2	2	1	3	1	1	1	2	4	2	2	7	649
2	(Australia) Mat Mladin	Suzuki	1	2	3	2	2	2	2	1	1	2	2	6	2	2	1	1	1	1	1	641
3	(Canada) Miguel Duhamel	Honda	3	4	2	6	4	3	3	4	5	7	4	4	3	3	4	3	4	5	16	511
4	(United States) Aaron Yates	Suzuki	6	7	4	4	8	4	5	6	6	6	7	5	4	27	5	2	3	3	2	484
5	(United Kingdom) Neil Hodgson	Ducati	4	6	5	5	5	5	4	5	4	4	6	3	16	5	3	Ret	5	4	3	469
6	(United States) Tommy Hayden	Kawasaki	5	5	7	8	6	7	6	7	8	5	5	2	5	7	8	24	7	9	6	455
7	(United States) Jake Zemke	Honda	8	3	Ret	3	3	8	8	3	3	8	1	8	29	4	6	5	6	8	8	447
8	(United States) Jason Pridmore	Suzuki	9	10	10	9	9	11	11	9	9	9	8	9	30	6	7	8	8	12	5	400
9	(United States) Ben Bostrom	Ducati	7	9	6	7	7	6	7	8	7	3	Ret	7	20	26	11	6	20	7	4	391
10	(United States) Larry Pegram	Honda	21	12	9	10	10	10	12	13	12	12	20	13	9	11	12	11	14	16	11	351
11	(United States) Steve Rapp	Suzuki	Ret	11	12	12	11	9	9	10	11	11	9	10	6	Ret	10	Ret	9	11	Ret	314
12	(United States) Jake Holden	Suzuki	10	29	8	11	20	Ret	10	11	10	10	11	29	7	9	14	Ret	10	10	21	296
13	(United States) Jason Curtis	Suzuki	DNS	17	17	13	13	12	16	26	Ret	16	14	19	19	13	15	15	16	14	12	260
14	(United States) Eric Wood	Suzuki	11	18	14	14	12	13	15	Ret	15	Ret	15	18	13	29	Ret	10	13	15	13	258
15	(United States) Matt Lynn	Suzuki	15	Ret	DNS	21	15	Ret	13	12	Ret	13	10	15	10	10	Ret	9	11	13	23	243
16	(United States) Scott Jensen	Suzuki						22	19	17	19	21	19	17	12	12	18	13	18	22	24	181
17	(United States) Roger Lee Hayden	Kawasaki	22	14	25									11	8	8	9	7	21	6	Ret	178
18	(United States) Akira Tamitsuji	Suzuki	14	19	28			17	20	14	13	14	13	16	17	21	25	Ret				172
19	(United States) Cory West	Suzuki	12	16			22	Ret	17	Ret	Ret	Ret	22	Ret	14	15	13	12	17	20	25	167
20	(United States) Dean Mizdal	Suzuki	Ret					16	22	20	20	23	25	21	18	19	19	17	19	24	28	143
21	(United States) John Haner	Suzuki	Ret	8								17	18	Ret	11	28	17	Ret	12	21	22	125
22	(United States) Brad Hendry	Suzuki	16	24	22	18	16	23	21	19	18						22	20				122
23	(United States) Taylor Knapp	Suzuki		22	19					25	17	26	27			18	Ret	14	15	17	Ret	110
24	(Venezuela) Fernando Amantini	Suzuki				21	17	21	27	18	16	22	21		27	16	Ret	Ret				104
25	(United States) Michael Sanchez	Suzuki	17	26	27					23	21	25	30		25	Ret	23	21			17	86
26	(United States) Brian Stokes	Yamaha	18	21	18									26					Ret	19	14	70
27	(United States) Dominic Jones	Suzuki		27	24							27	26	Ret	Ret	20	21	16			27	60
28	(United Kingdom) Andy Notman	Suzuki		23	21			20	29			Ret	Ret		23	22	28	22				60
29	(Australia) Martin Craggill	Suzuki	13											12							9	59
30	(Venezuela) Robertino Pietri	Suzuki	Ret									15	16	20	15							58
31	(United States) David Weber	Suzuki										30	12		28	14	16	Ret				55
32	(United States) David Bell	Suzuki				20	18	15	18													53
33	(United States) Scott Carpenter	Suzuki		25	23												24	18	23	23	Ret	50
34	(United States) Ben Thompson	Suzuki									18	17									10	49
35	(United States) Lee Acree	Suzuki						Ret	14	16	14											49
36	(United States) Martin Swarc	Suzuki				19	19	24	24					23								46
37	(United States) Jason Perez	Yamaha				16	14							22								41
38	(Canada) Clint McBain	Suzuki		15	13																	34
39	(United States) C R Gittere	Suzuki	20					Ret	28	22	22	28	Ret									34
40	(United States) Chris Ulrich	Suzuki	Ret							15	Ret			14	DNS	DNS	DNS	DNS	DNS	DNS	DNS	33
41	(United States) James Kerker	Honda		Ret	26										24	24					18	32
42	(United States) Corey Eaton	Suzuki				23	21	26	25					28								32
42	(United Kingdom) Gary Mason	Suzuki																	21	18	26	28
44	(United States) Mark Ledesma	Honda				17	Ret					20	29	Ret								27
45	(United States) Corey Sarros	Suzuki						19	23					24								27

Colour	Result
Gold	Winner
Silver	Second place
Bronze	Third place
Green	Points classification
Blue	Non-points classification
Blue	Non-classified finish (NC)
Purple	Retired, not classified (Ret)
Red	Did not qualify (DNQ)
Red	Did not pre-qualify (DNPQ)
Black	Disqualified (DSQ)
White	Did not start (DNS)
White	Withdrew (WD)
White	Race cancelled (C)
Blank	Did not practice (DNP)
Blank	Did not arrive (DNA)
Blank	Excluded (EX)

Pos.	Pts.	Pos.	Pts.
1	36	16	15
2	32	17	14
3	29	18	13
4	27	19	12
5	26	20	11
6	25	21	10
7	24	22	9
8	23	23	8
9	22	24	7
10	21	25	6
11	20	26	5
12	19	27	4
13	18	28	3
14	17	29	2
15	16	30	1
1pt for Pole Position
1pt for Most Laps Led

== AMA Superstock ==
=== Rider Standings ===
Pos	Rider	Bike	DAY (Florida)	BAR (Alabama)	FON (California)	INF (California)	RAM (Wisconsin)	MIL (Utah)	LAG (California)	M-O (Ohio)	VIR (Virginia)	RAT (Georgia (U.S. state))	M-O (Ohio)	Pts
Pos	Rider	Bike	R1	R1	R1	R1	R1	R1	R1	R1	R1	R1	R1	Pts
1	(United States) Jamie Hacking	Yamaha	1	2	2	1	2	1	1	1	2	1	19	363
2	(United States) Aaron Yates	Suzuki	3	1	3	2	1	2	2	3	4	7	2	338
3	(United States) Jason DiSalvo	Yamaha	2	3	1	18	3	4	4	6	3	3	1	319
4	(United States) Geoff May	Suzuki	4	4	4	4	4	3	7	4	7	9	3	292
5	(United States) Josh Hayes	Honda	5	5	8	8	5	7	10	8	5	4	5	271
6	(United States) Eric Bostrom	Yamaha	Ret	6	5	3	29	8	3	2	1	2	7	262
7	(United States) Steve Rapp	Suzuki	Ret	7	6	7	6	6	5	Ret	6	5	4	227
8	(Australia) Martin Craggill	Suzuki	10	13	Ret	6	9	10	9	9	10	12	6	216
9	(United States) Chris Ulrich	Suzuki	14	11	12	14	13	12	15	10	12	14	10	204
10	(Australia) Aaron Gobert	Honda	8	9	11	10	12	9	Ret	7	11	8	DNS	194
11	(United States) Ben Attard	Kawasaki	12	15	13	16	15	17	12	13	15	13	9	191
12	(United States) Jake Holden	Suzuki	11	8	9	5	Ret	14	6	5	DNS	6	DNS	184
13	(United States) Matt Lynn	Suzuki	16	20	10	9	10	5	11	Ret	8	Ret	8	182
14	(Australia) Damon Buckmaster	Kawasaki	6	14	Ret	13	8	11	14	22	9	10	Ret	172
15	(Venezuela) Robertino Pietri	Suzuki	7	21	15	17	16	15	17	14	16	17	20	166
16	(United States) Cory West	Suzuki	15	12	Ret	15	11	16	Ret	12	14	16	11	157
17	(United States) Jason Pridmore	Suzuki	9	10	7	11	7	Ret	8	Ret	20			145
18	(United States) Akira Tamitsuji	Suzuki	17	16		18	14	13	13	15	Ret			111
19	(United States) John Haner	Suzuki	13						16	11	13	11	12	110
20	(United States) Brad Hendry	Suzuki	Ret	19	18	Ret	18	20	20	18	19	20		96
21	(United States) Michael Sanchez	Suzuki	19	Ret			19	21		Ret	18	21	14	74
22	(Venezuela) Fernando Amantini	Kawasaki	26	26	16	Ret	17	19	Ret	16		23		74
23	(United States) Ben Thompson	Suzuki			14	20		18					Ret	41
24	(United States) Marco Martinez	Suzuki				Ret	22	22	26	17				37
25	(United States) CR Giterre	Suzuki	21	25	25	27	21	Ret						36
26	(United Kingdom) Gary Mason	Suzuki										15	13	34
27	(United States) Randall Kienast	Suzuki	28	22					24				16	34
28	(United States) Corey Eaton	Suzuki			17	24			19					33
29	(United States) Martin Szwarc	Suzuki			19	21			22					31
30	(United States) James Kerker	Honda	Ret				26	25	Ret	19		24		30
31	(United States) Dan Lippis	Suzuki					20	24	23					26
32	(United States) Barry Teasdale	Suzuki		23								19		23
33	(United States) Bryan West	Suzuki	22	18										22
34	(United States) Dan Wilson	Suzuki		24			25	23	30					22
35	(United States) Lance Williams	Suzuki			26	25		26	25					22
36	(United States) Leonardo Bagnis	Yamaha				23			18					21
37	(United States) David Stanton	Suzuki				12								19
38	(United States) Tim Knutson	Yamaha			22				21					19
39	(United States) Johnny Rock Page	Suzuki	23				24	27						19
40	(Colombia) Carlos Macias	Kawasaki	24							21				17

== AMA Formula Xtreme ==
=== Rider Standings ===
Pos	Rider	Bike	DAY (Florida)	BAR (Alabama)	FON (California)	INF (California)	RAM (Wisconsin)	MIL (Utah)	LAG (California)	M-O (Ohio)	VIR (Virginia)	RAT (Georgia (U.S. state))	M-O (Ohio)	Pts
Pos	Rider	Bike	R1	R1	R1	R1	R1	R1	R1	R1	R1	R1	R1	Pts
1	(United States) Josh Hayes	Honda	2	2	3	4	2	1	3	2	2	1	1	358
2	(United States) Eric Bostrom	Yamaha	4	22	1	1	1	3	1	1	1	2	2	351
3	(United States) Jason DiSalvo	Yamaha	3	1	2	2	3	4	2	3	3	3	3	342
4	(Australia) Aaron Gobert	Honda	6	4	4	6	8	2	7	4	4	4	Ret	264
5	(United States) Ryan Andrews	Honda	Ret	7	6	8	5	6	4	7	6	6	5	250
6	(United States) Michael Barnes	Suzuki				5	4	7	5	5	5	5	4	208
7	(United States) Tony Meiring	Suzuki	12	15	11	9	7	9	17	10	Ret	10	12	198
8	(United States) Ty Howard	Honda	Ret	13	7	10	6	21	6	Ret	10	7	6	193
9	(United States) Blake Young	Suzuki	9	9	8	7	Ret	8	Ret	8	8	Ret	11	180
10	(United States) Danny Eslick	Suzuki	Ret	5	5	3	Ret	5	Ret	6	Ret	Ret	7	156
11	(United States) Chris Caylor	Suzuki	23	14	13	18	11	13	11	12				133
12	(Venezuela) Víctor Chirinos	Kawasaki	17	20	17	17	15	22	16	19	Ret	15		121
13	(United States) Eric Wood	Honda	8	6							7	8	10	116
14	(United States) Ryan Elleby	Honda	11	10	12	11	22	Ret	10	Ret				110
15	(Venezuela) Armando Ferrer	Kawasaki	Ret	18	15	16	Ret	12	Ret	13	Ret	14	Ret	98
16	(United States) Brian Stokes	Yamaha	16	8					9			9	6	97
17	(United States) Garrett Carter	Yamaha		24			12		12	Ret		12	13	82
18	(United States) Chris Siebenhaar	Suzuki					25		16	14	20	17		17
19	(United States) Johnny Rock Page	Yamaha	21	Ret		23	20	17	24		19		23	70
20	(United States) Tyler McDonald	Yamaha	Ret	17			13			15			15	64
21	(United Kingdom) Alastair Seeley	Yamaha	Ret	26			9			14	12			63
22	(United States) Nicky Moore	Yamaha		11	9	14								59
23	(United States) Taylor Knapp	Suzuki		12				10		Ret	13			58
24	(United States) James Kerker	Honda	24	19	18	Ret	18	23		27				57
25	(United States) Kurtis Roberts	Suzuki		3	10									50
26	(Canada) Steve Crevier	Buell	Ret				23			9	11		Ret	50
27	(United States) Grant Riggs	Suzuki			19	12			13					49
28	(United States) Keith Marshall	Suzuki	Ret	16							15	13		49
29	(United States) Jeremiah Johnson	Suzuki	Ret	25		20		15	20					44
30	(United States) Michael Beck	Yamaha										11	9	42
31	(United Kingdom) Jeremy McWilliams	Buell	Ret			27			8			18	Ret	40
32	(United States) Shane Narbonne	Suzuki									14	17	22	40
33	(United States) Jake Zemke	Honda	1											37
34	(United States) Kenny Carlotta	Suzuki	Ret	23	Ret	19			15					36
35	(United States) Myron Bell	Suzuki					17			12			19	31
36	(United States) Mike Hale	Buell		28					Ret	17	18			30
37	(United States) Gustavo Laya	Kawasaki							18	16				28
38	(United States) Marco Martinez	Yamaha	28	21							Ret	16	Ret	28
39	(United States) Jessica Zalusky	Kawasaki					21	20		24				28
40	(Canada) Miguel Duhamel	Honda	5											27
41	(United States) Berto Wooldridge	Suzuki						14	21					27
42	(United States) Jonas McCluskey	Yamaha					16						20	26
43	(United States) Geoff May	Suzuki	7											24
44	(United States) Kim Nakashima	Suzuki				15			23					24
45	(United Kingdom) Chaz Davies	Yamaha											8	23

== AMA Supersport ==
=== Rider Standings ===
Pos	Rider	Bike	DAY (Florida)	BAR (Alabama)	FON (California)	INF (California)	RAM (Wisconsin)	MIL (Utah)	LAG (California)	M-O (Ohio)	VIR (Virginia)	RAT (Georgia (U.S. state))	M-O (Ohio)	Pts
Pos	Rider	Bike	R1	R1	R1	R1	R1	R1	R1	R1	R1	R1	R1	Pts
1	(United States) Jamie Hacking	Yamaha	2	2	1	C	1	1	1	1	1	1	4	360
2	(United States) Geoff May	Suzuki	7	3	5	C	2	24	7	4	2	2	3	262
3	(United States) Michael Barnes	Suzuki	Ret	7	2	C	3	10	5	3	3	3	2	252
4	(United States) Ben Attard	Kawasaki	10	4	4	C	10	6	4	6	5	5	6	250
5	(United States) Roger Lee Hayden	Kawasaki	1	1		C	4	2	2	2	Ret	28	1	237
6	(United States) Danny Eslick	Suzuki	5	6	3	C	8	4	6	5	8	4	Ret	231
7	(United States) Blake Young	Suzuki	13	9	7	C	9	8	8	8	6	7	8	227
8	(United States) Tony Meiring	Suzuki	19	13	8	C	11	11	9	13	10	10	9	197
9	(United States) Michael Beck	Yamaha	21	12	6	C	12	5	25	26	11	8	7	177
10	(Australia) Damon Buckmaster	Kawasaki	6	5	Ret	C	7	7	Ret	27	7	6	Ret	152
11	(United States) Josh Herrin	Yamaha				C	6	7	10	10	23	9	Ret	121
12	(United States) Garrett Carter	Yamaha		17			13		27	11	13	13	11	112
13	(United States) Chris Caylor	Suzuki	24	11	10	C	18	15	14	18				107
14	(United States) Ben Spies	Suzuki	4			C	5		3	7				106
15	(United States) Ryan Elleby	Honda	15	8					12	9			13	98
16	(United States) Jeffrey Tigert	Honda	12	Ret	9	C	14	12	11					97
17	(United Kingdom) Alastair Seeley	Yamaha	9	16			16			12	12			90
18	(United States) Barrett Long	Yamaha	16	23	14	C			16		14	15		88
19	(United States) Shea Fouchek	Suzuki	20		20			16	18	15	24	18		86
20	(United States) Tyler McDonald	Yamaha	11	19		C	20		17	14			Ret	74
21	(United States) Jim Wood	Kawasaki			Ret		24	Ret	13	16	17		17	68
22	(United States) Taylor Knapp	Suzuki					17					12	10	54
23	(United States) Johnny Rock Page	Yamaha	29	30	24		29	25		24	21	27	21	49
24	(United States) Chris Siglin	Suzuki		21	DNS			13	15					44
25	(United States) Brandon Parrish	Suzuki								19		17	14	43
26	(United States) Scott Jackson	Suzuki						20	21		16		24	43
27	(United States) Jeff Wood	Suzuki									9	11		42
28	(United States) Chris Siebenhaar	Suzuki			29			27		Ret	18	23	16	42
29	(United States) Keith Marshall	Suzuki	Ret	20							15	19		39
30	(Venezuela) Armando Ferrer	Kawasaki			15		19	21						38
31	(Japan) Akira Tamitsuji	Suzuki										14	12	36
32	(United States) Brant Wiwi	Yamaha			17		21		20					35
33	(Mexico) Dirk Sanchez	Yamaha	Ret								20	25	15	33
34	(United States) Grant Riggs	Suzuki			11				19					32
35	(United States) Tommy Hayden	Kawasaki	3											29
36	(United States) Shane Narbonne	Suzuki									Ret	16	18	28
37	(Canada) Chris Peris	Yamaha			Ret						4			27
38	(United States) Tristan Schoenewald	Honda	22		13									27
39	(United States) Jon Blaylock	Honda			18			17						27
40	(United Kingdom) Chaz Davies	Yamaha											5	26
