= 2008 AMA Superbike Championship =

Seasons
- ← 2007 2009 →

The 2008 AMA Superbike Championship was the 33rd season of the AMA Superbike Championship. Ben Spies won the championship riding a Suzuki.

== Calendar and results ==
No		Circuit	Location	Date	Pole position	Fastest lap	Winner
1	R1	March 8	(Florida) Daytona International Speedway	Daytona Beach, Florida	(Australia) Mat Mladin	(Australia) Mat Mladin	(Australia) Mat Mladin
2	R1	April 19	(Alabama) Barber Motorsports Park	Leeds, Alabama	(Australia) Mat Mladin	(Australia) Mat Mladin	(Australia) Mat Mladin
2	R2	April 20	(Alabama) Barber Motorsports Park	Leeds, Alabama	(Australia) Mat Mladin	(United States) Ben Spies	(Australia) Mat Mladin
3	R1	April 26	(California) Auto Club Speedway	Fontana, California	(United States) Ben Spies	(Australia) Mat Mladin	(United States) Ben Spies
3	R2	April 27	(California) Auto Club Speedway	Fontana, California	(United States) Ben Spies	(Australia) Mat Mladin	(United States) Ben Spies
4	R1	May 17	(California) Infineon Raceway	Sonoma, California	(United States) Ben Spies	(United States) Ben Spies	(United States) Ben Spies
4	R2	May 18	(California) Infineon Raceway	Sonoma, California	(United States) Ben Spies	(United States) Ben Spies	(United States) Ben Spies
5	R1	May 30	(Utah) Miller Motorsports Park	Tooele, Utah	(United States) Ben Spies	(United States) Ben Spies	(United States) Ben Spies
5	R2	June 1	(Utah) Miller Motorsports Park	Tooele, Utah	(United States) Ben Spies	(United States) Ben Spies	(United States) Ben Spies
6	R1	June 7	(Wisconsin) Road America	Elkhart Lake, Wisconsin	(United States) Ben Spies	(United States) Ben Spies	(United States) Ben Spies
6	R2	June 8	(Wisconsin) Road America	Elkhart Lake, Wisconsin	(United States) Ben Spies	(United States) Ben Spies	(Australia) Mat Mladin
7	R1	July 20	(California) Mazda Raceway Laguna Seca	Monterey, California	(United States) Ben Spies	(Australia) Mat Mladin	(Australia) Mat Mladin
8	R1	August 2	Mid-Ohio Sports Car Course	Lexington, Ohio	(United States) Ben Spies	(Australia) Mat Mladin	(Australia) Mat Mladin
8	R2	August 3	Mid-Ohio Sports Car Course	Lexington, Ohio	(United States) Ben Spies	(Australia) Mat Mladin	(Australia) Mat Mladin
9	R1	August 16	Virginia International Raceway	Danville, Virginia	(United States) Ben Spies	(Australia) Mat Mladin	(United States) Ben Spies
9	R2	August 17	Virginia International Raceway	Danville, Virginia	(United States) Ben Spies	(Australia) Mat Mladin	(United States) Ben Spies
10	R1	August 30	(Georgia (U.S. state)) Road Atlanta	Braselton, Georgia	(United States) Ben Spies	(United States) Ben Spies	(Australia) Mat Mladin
10	R2	August 31	(Georgia (U.S. state)) Road Atlanta	Braselton, Georgia	(United States) Ben Spies	(United States) Ben Spies	(United States) Ben Spies
11	R1	September 28	(California) Mazda Raceway Laguna Seca	Monterey, California	(Australia) Mat Mladin	(Australia) Mat Mladin	(Australia) Mat Mladin

== Riders Championship standings ==
Pos	Rider	Bike	DAY	BAR		FON		INF		MIL		RAM		LAG	M-O		VIR		RAT		LAG	Pts
Pos	Rider	Bike	DAY	R1	R2	R1	R2	R1	R2	R1	R2	R1	R2	LAG	R1	R2	R1	R2	R1	R2	LAG	Pts
1	(United States) Ben Spies	Suzuki	2	11	2	**1**	**1**	**1**	**1**	**1**	**1**	**1**	**2**	**2**	**2**	**2**	**1**	**1**	**2**	**1**	2	652
2	(Australia) Mat Mladin	Suzuki	**1**	**1**	**1**	2	2	2	2	Ret	4	2	1	1	1	1	DSQ	DSQ	1	2	**1**	557
3	(United States) Jason DiSalvo	Yamaha	3	2	4	8	5	7	17	7	8	7	12	8	4	7	4	8	6	5	8	463
4	(United States) Eric Bostrom	Yamaha	25	7	6	5	6	4	6	6	9	8	5	9	7	20	3	3	5	6	6	445
5	(United States) Jamie Hacking	Kawasaki	5	4	21	6	7	3	3	2	2	3	3	4	3	3	19	5	13	21		421
6	(United Kingdom) Neil Hodgson	Honda	7	5	5	4	4	6	5	3	3	4	4	7	22	4	20	6	21	7	5	419
7	(Canada) Miguel Duhamel	Honda	12	6	8	7	Ret	10	7	5	6	5	6	10	21	6	5	4	7	4	7	412
8	(United States) Tommy Hayden	Suzuki	4	3	3	3	3							5	5	5	2	2	3	3	3	372
9	(United States) Aaron Yates	Suzuki	6	20	7	11	Ret	5	4	4	5	6	8	3								234
10	(United States) Geoff May	Suzuki	10	8	10	12	Ret	9	8	Ret	7	9	7									199
11	(United States) Scott Jensen	Suzuki	16	13	16	13	8	Ret	11	10	13	11	11									188
12	(Canada) Chris Peris	Suzuki	13	9	11	Ret	Ret	11	9	8	10	12	10									186
13	(United States) Matt Lynn	Honda	14	19	9	9	9	8	18	16	19	Ret	17									172
14	(United States) Dean Mizdal	Suzuki	20	21	22	15	10	Ret	13	17	14	15	16									147
15	(United States) Johnny Rock Page	Yamaha	24			16	12	17	15	14	18											101
16	(United States) Taylor Knapp	Suzuki		12	14			13	Ret	11	11											94
17	(United States) Ryan Elleby	Suzuki		15	Ret			12	10			13	13									92
18	(United States) Ben Thompson	Suzuki	17	18	13					Ret	17	Ret	18									72
19	(United States) Keith Marshall	Suzuki	22	16	19							16	15									67
20	(United States) Eric Haugo	Suzuki						15	14	15	16											64
21	(United States) Reno Karimian	Suzuki						18	16	13	15				Ret	Ret	Ret	Ret	Ret	Ret	Ret	62
22	(United States) Martin Szwarc	Suzuki						14	12	12	Ret											55
23	(United Kingdom) Alastair Seeley	Suzuki										10	9									43
24	(United States) David Anthony	Suzuki								9	12	Ret	Ret									41
25	(Canada) Jordan Szoke	Kawasaki		10	12																	40
26	(Colombia) Santiago Villa	Suzuki	21	17	20					Ret	Ret											35
27	(United States) Hawk Mazzotta	Suzuki				14	Ret					Ret	14									34
28	(United States) Tim Knutson	Suzuki				18	11															33
29	(United States) Brett McCormick	Suzuki		14	15																	33
30	(United States) Roger Lee Hayden	Suzuki	8	Ret	Ret									6								23
31	(Canada) Francis Martin	Suzuki		22	17																	23
32	(United States) Blake Young	Suzuki	9																			22
33	(United States) Jake Holden	Suzuki				10	Ret															21
34	(Japan) Akira Yanagawa	Suzuki	11																			20
35	(Venezuela) Robertino Pietri	Suzuki	Ret	Ret	Ret	Ret	Ret	Ret	Ret			14	Ret									17
36	(United States) Chris Ulrich	Suzuki	15	Ret	Ret																	16
37	(United States) Lee Acree	Suzuki						16	Ret													15
38	(United States) Jason Pridmore	Suzuki				17	Ret															14
39	(United Kingdom) Matthew McBride	Suzuki		Ret	18																	13
40	(United States) Brian McCormack	Suzuki	18																			13
41	(Austria) Horst Saiger	Suzuki	19																			12
42	(United States) James McBride	Suzuki	23																			8
43	(United States) Jeremy Toye	Honda				Ret	Ret															0
44	(United States) Scott Russell	Suzuki	Ret																			0
Pos	Rider	Bike	DAY	BAR		FON		INF		MIL		RAM		LAG	M-O		VIR		RAT		LAG	Pts

Colour	Result
Gold	Winner (1)
Silver	2nd place (2)
Bronze	3rd place (3)
Green	Finished, in points (4-20)
Blue	Finished, no points (21+)
Purple	Did not finish (Ret)
Purple	Not classified (NC)
Red	Did not qualify (DNQ)
Black	Disqualified (DSQ)
White	Did not start (DNS)
Blank	Did not participate
Blank	Withdrawn due to injury (INJ)
Blank	Excluded (EX)
Blank	Race cancelled (C)
**Bold**	**Pole Position**
Italics	Lap Leader

Pos.	Pts.	Pos.	Pts.
1	36	16	15
2	32	17	14
3	29	18	13
4	27	19	12
5	26	20	11
6	25	21	10
7	24	22	9
8	23	23	8
9	22	24	7
10	21	25	6
11	20	26	5
12	19	27	4
13	18	28	3
14	17	29	2
15	16	30	1
1pt for **Pole Position**
1pt for Most Laps Led

Mat Mladin won the races at VIR but was later disqualified for an illegal crankshaft.

== Participants ==
No	Rider	Team	Motorcycle	Tire
1	(United States) Ben Spies	Yoshimura Suzuki	Suzuki GSX-R1000	D
2	(United States) Jamie Hacking	Monster Energy Kawasaki	Kawasaki ZX-10R	D
6	(Australia) Mat Mladin	Yoshimura Suzuki	Suzuki GSX-R1000	D
7	(United States) Scott Russell	Jamie James Yamaha	Yamaha YZF-R1	D
8	(Canada) Chris Peris	Team ESP	Suzuki GSX-R1000	D
17	(Canada) Miguel Duhamel	American Honda	Honda CBR1000RR	D
18	(United States) Chris Ulrich	Roadracing World	Suzuki GSX-R1000	P
20	(United States) Aaron Yates	Jordan Suzuki	Suzuki GSX-R1000	D
22	(United States) Tommy Hayden	Yoshimura Suzuki	Suzuki GSX-R1000	D
23	(Colombia) Santiago Villa	Roadracing World	Suzuki GSX-R1000	P
32	(United States) Eric Bostrom	Yamaha Motor Company	Yamaha YZF-R1	D
34	(United States) Michael Barnes	M4 Emgo Suzuki	Suzuki GSX-R1000	D
38	(United States) Dean Mizdal	M Racing Suzuki	Suzuki GSX-R1000	D
40	(United States) Jason DiSalvo	Yamaha Motor Company	Yamaha YZF-R1	D
48	(United States) Reno Karimian	-	Suzuki GSX-R1000	D
50	(United States) Matt Lynn	Corona Extra Honda	Honda CBR1000RR	D
59	(United States) Jake Holden	Corona Extra Honda	Honda CBR1000RR	D
61	(United States) Scott Jensen	-	Suzuki GSX-R1000	D
79	(United States) Blake Young	M4 Emgo Suzuki	Suzuki GSX-R1000	P
85	(United States) Ryan Elleby	-	Suzuki GSX-R1000	
87	(United States) Taylor Knapp	-	Suzuki GSX-R1000	P
92	(United States) Keith Marshall	-	Suzuki GSX-R1000	D
95	(United States) Roger Lee Hayden	Monster Energy Kawasaki	Kawasaki ZX-10R	D
99	(United States) Geoff May	Jordan Suzuki	Suzuki GSX-R1000	D
100	(United Kingdom) Neil Hodgson	American Honda	Honda CBR1000RR	D
107	(Canada) Jordan Szoke	-	Kawasaki ZX-10R	
113	(Canada) Matthew McBride	-	Suzuki GSX-R1000	
216	(Canada) Francis Martin	-	Suzuki GSX-R1000	P
241	(United Kingdom) James McBride	-	Suzuki GSX-R1000	
269	(United States) Johnny Rock Page	-	Yamaha YZF-R1	
311	(Venezuela) Robertino Pietri	Roadracing World	Suzuki GSX-R1000	P
312	(United Kingdom) Brian McCormack	-	Suzuki GSX-R1000	D
487	(Japan) Akira Yanagawa	-	Kawasaki ZX-10R	
611	(Canada) Brett McCormick	-	Kawasaki ZX-10R	D
710	(Liechtenstein) Horst Saiger	-	Suzuki GSX-R1000	P
907	(United States) Ben Thompson	-	Suzuki GSX-R1000	
