= 2003 Superbike World Championship =

2003 Superbike World Championship
Previous:	2002	Next:	2004
Support series: Supersport World Championship; Superstock European Championship

The 2003 Superbike World Championship was the sixteenth FIM Superbike World Championship season. The season started on 2 March at Valencia and finished on 19 October at Magny-Cours after 12 rounds.

Rule changes for 2003 allowed 1000cc machines (either twins, triples or four-cylinder) to race. The rule changes in MotoGP which allowed 4-stroke engines starting from 2002 meant that the Japanese manufacturers had focused their resources there; as a result the Superbike World Championship was left with limited factory involvement, with Ducati, Suzuki and the new-for-2003 Carl Fogarty's Foggy Petronas as the only factory teams. As a result of most of the field being formed of Ducati motorcycles, the championship was given the derogatory label of the "Ducati Cup" in some quarters.

The factory Ducati Team entered the only two Ducati 999s in the field, taking 20 wins from 24 races in a season where all races were won by Ducati. Neil Hodgson won the riders' championship and Ducati won the manufacturers' championship.

== Entry list ==
2003 Entry List
Team	Constructor	Motorcycle	Tyre	No.	Rider	Rounds
(Austria) RTZ powered by ROTAX	Aprilia	Aprilia RSV 1000	P	70	(Austria) Christian Zaiser	7
(Italy) Caracchi NCR Nortel Net.	Ducati	Ducati 996RS	D	50	(Italy) Marco Masetti	4
(United Kingdom) Firepower Ducati	Ducati	Ducati 996RS		89	(United Kingdom) Dean Ellison	9
(Italy) Gi.Bi. Team	Ducati	Ducati 996RS	P	82	(Italy) Lorenzo Mauri	4
(Italy) Lucido Corse	Ducati	Ducati 996RS	D	113	(Italy) Paolo Blora	4, 7
(Japan) Team Foundation	Ducati	Ducati 996RS	D	79	(Japan) Noriyasu Numata	3
(United Kingdom) HM Plant Ducati	Ducati	Ducati 998F02	D	9	(United Kingdom) Chris Walker	All
(United Kingdom) HM Plant Ducati	Ducati	Ducati 998F02	D	52	(United Kingdom) James Toseland	All
(United Kingdom) Monstermob Ducati	Ducati	Ducati 998F02	D	67	(United Kingdom) Shane Byrne	9
(United Kingdom) Renegade Ducati	Ducati	Ducati 998F02	D	60	(United Kingdom) Michael Rutter	6, 9
(United Kingdom) Renegade Ducati	Ducati	Ducati 998F02	D	62	(United Kingdom) Sean Emmett	6
(Italy) Caracchi NCR Nortel Net.	Ducati	Ducati 998RS	D	38	(Italy) Giancarlo De Matteis	9
(Italy) Caracchi NCR Nortel Net.	Ducati	Ducati 998RS	D	48	(Spain) David García	1–3, 5–8, 10–12
(Italy) Caracchi NCR Nortel Net.	Ducati	Ducati 998RS	D	55	(France) Régis Laconi	All
(Italy) D.F.X. Racing Team	Ducati	Ducati 998RS	P	20	(Italy) Marco Borciani	All
(Italy) D.F.X. Racing Team	Ducati	Ducati 998RS	P	33	(Spain) Juan Borja	All
(Italy) D.F.X. Racing Team	Ducati	Ducati 998RS	P	99	(Australia) Steve Martin	All
(United States) Ducati Austin	Ducati	Ducati 998RS	D	15	(Italy) Giovanni Bussei	8
(United Kingdom) ETI Racing	Ducati	Ducati 998RS	D	62	(United Kingdom) Sean Emmett	9
(Czech Republic) JM SBK Team	Ducati	Ducati 998RS	D	23	(Czech Republic) Jiří Mrkývka	4–5, 7–12
(United Kingdom) Renegade Ducati	Ducati	Ducati 998RS	D	40	(United Kingdom) Nick Medd	9
(United Kingdom) Renegade Ducati	Ducati	Ducati 998RS	D	90	(United Kingdom) Leon Haslam	9–10, 12
(Italy) Team Pedercini	Ducati	Ducati 998RS	D	19	(Italy) Lucio Pedercini	All
(Italy) Team Pedercini	Ducati	Ducati 998RS	D	26	(Italy) Luca Pedersoli	8–11
(Italy) Team Pedercini	Ducati	Ducati 998RS	D	28	(Italy) Serafino Foti	1, 4–7
(Italy) Team Pedercini	Ducati	Ducati 998RS	D	35	(Italy) Nello Russo	1–2, 5–7
(Italy) Team Pedercini	Ducati	Ducati 998RS	D	82	(Italy) Lorenzo Mauri	11
(Italy) Team Pro.Con.	Ducati	Ducati 998RS	D	29	(Italy) Giuseppe Zannini	7, 11
(San Marino) Team PSG-1	Ducati	Ducati 998RS	D	7	(Italy) Pierfrancesco Chili	All
(Italy) Ducati Fila	Ducati	Ducati 999F03	M	11	(Spain) Rubén Xaus	All
(Italy) Ducati Fila	Ducati	Ducati 999F03	M	100	(United Kingdom) Neil Hodgson	All
(Australia) Michelin Honda	Honda	Honda CBR954RR	M	75	(Australia) Alistair Maxwell	2
(Japan) Blue Helmet MSC	Honda	Honda VTR 1000SP2	D	74	(Japan) Kenichiro Nakamura	3
(Italy) White Endurance	Honda	Honda VTR 1000SP2	D	68	(France) Bertrand Stey	12
(Italy) White Endurance	Honda	Honda VTR 1000SP2	D	91	(Italy) Walter Tortoroglio	1–11
(Japan) Team HRC	Honda	Honda VTR 1000SPW	M	77	(Japan) Hitoyasu Izutsu	3
(Netherlands) Greven Mc Delar	Kawasaki	Kawasaki ZX-7RR	P	45	(Netherlands) Jan Greven	10
(Italy) Kawasaki Bertocchi	Kawasaki	Kawasaki ZX-7RR	D	5	(Italy) Ivan Clementi	All
(Italy) Kawasaki Bertocchi	Kawasaki	Kawasaki ZX-7RR	D	6	(Italy) Mauro Sanchini	All
(United States) Kawasaki Road Racing	Kawasaki	Kawasaki ZX-7RR	D	32	(United States) Eric Bostrom	8
(Belgium) Alstare Suzuki	Suzuki	Suzuki GSX-R1000	D	10	(Spain) Gregorio Lavilla	All
(Belgium) Alstare Suzuki	Suzuki	Suzuki GSX-R1000	D	31	(Italy) Vittorio Iannuzzo	4–7, 10
(Netherlands) Bertus Folkertsma Racing	Suzuki	Suzuki GSX-R1000	P	43	(Netherlands) Bertus Folkertsma	10
(Italy) Boselli Racing	Suzuki	Suzuki GSX-R1000	D	96	(Italy) Luca Pini	7, 11
(Germany) Elf Yoshimura Schäfer Motorsport	Suzuki	Suzuki GSX-R1000	P	44	(Germany) Stefan Nebel	10
(Netherlands) Kruisinga Motoren Racing	Suzuki	Suzuki GSX-R1000	P	42	(Netherlands) Paul Mooijman	10
(Spain) MIR Racing	Suzuki	Suzuki GSX-R1000	D	16	(Spain) Sergio Fuertes	1, 4–7, 9–12
(Australia) Motorcycle Weaponry	Suzuki	Suzuki GSX-R1000	D	73	(Australia) Steven Cutting	2
(Netherlands) Racing Team R.Menzen	Suzuki	Suzuki GSX-R1000		41	(Netherlands) Robert Menzen	10
(Austria) Racing Team Zaiser	Suzuki	Suzuki GSX-R1000	P	70	(Austria) Christian Zaiser	12
(United Kingdom) Rizla Suzuki	Suzuki	Suzuki GSX-R1000	D	61	(United Kingdom) John Reynolds	6, 9–10
(United Kingdom) Rizla Suzuki	Suzuki	Suzuki GSX-R1000	D	64	(United Kingdom) Yukio Kagayama	6, 9
(Italy) Scuderia HF	Suzuki	Suzuki GSX-R1000	D	57	(Italy) Simone Conti	11
(France) SERT	Suzuki	Suzuki GSX-R1000	D	93	(France) Sébastien Gimbert	12
(Japan) Suzuki Yoshimura	Suzuki	Suzuki GSX-R1000	D	66	(Australia) Mat Mladin	8
(Japan) Suzuki Yoshimura	Suzuki	Suzuki GSX-R1000	D	120	(United States) Aaron Yates	8
(Japan) Team Suzuki	Suzuki	Suzuki GSX-R1000	D	76	(Japan) Atsushi Watanabe	3
(Australia) Warren & Brown Lightpaths	Suzuki	Suzuki GSX-R1000	D	78	(Australia) Jay Normoyle	2
(Malaysia) Foggy PETRONAS Racing	Petronas	Petronas FP1	M	4	(Australia) Troy Corser	All
(Malaysia) Foggy PETRONAS Racing	Petronas	Petronas FP1	M	8	(United Kingdom) James Haydon	1–5, 8–12
(Malaysia) Foggy PETRONAS Racing	Petronas	Petronas FP1	M	82	(Italy) Lorenzo Mauri	7
(Spain) Acumoto Racing Team	Yamaha	Yamaha YZF-R1	D	71	(Spain) Martin Benito Isaac	1
(Norway) Komatsu Sundby Racing	Yamaha	Yamaha YZF-R1	P	36	(Norway) Sundby Dag Steinar	5
(Italy) Nuvolari 391	Yamaha	Yamaha YZF-R1	D	39	(Italy) Alessandro Gramigni	4, 7, 9–12
Remus Racing Austria	Yamaha	Yamaha YZF-R1	P	22	(Austria) Horst Saiger	10–12
Remus Racing Austria	Yamaha	Yamaha YZF-R1	P	69	(Austria) Karl Truchsess	10
(Italy) Team X-Racing	Yamaha	Yamaha YZF-R1	D	95	(Italy) Redamo Assirelli	7
(Italy) UnionBike GIMotorsport	Yamaha	Yamaha YZF-R1	D	15	(Italy) Giovanni Bussei	1–7
(Italy) UnionBike GIMotorsport	Yamaha	Yamaha YZF-R1	D	39	(Italy) Alessandro Gramigni	1
(Italy) UnionBike GIMotorsport	Yamaha	Yamaha YZF-R1	D	51	(Italy) Davide Messori	2
(Italy) UnionBike GIMotorsport	Yamaha	Yamaha YZF-R1	D	95	(Italy) Redamo Assirelli	9
(Italy) UnionBike GIMotorsport	Yamaha	Yamaha YZF-R1	P	92	(France) Frédéric Protat	12
(Italy) UnionBike GIMotorsport	Yamaha	Yamaha YZF-R1	P	98	(Italy) Gianmaria Liverani	10–11

Key
Regular rider
Wildcard rider
Replacement rider
D Dunlop
M Michelin
P Pirelli

== Race calendar and results ==
2003 Superbike World Championship Calendar
Round		Circuit	Date	Superpole	Fastest lap	Winning rider	Winning team	Report
1	R1	(Spain) Valencia	2 March	(United Kingdom) Neil Hodgson	(United Kingdom) Neil Hodgson	(United Kingdom) Neil Hodgson	Fila Ducati	Report
1	R2	(Spain) Valencia	2 March	(United Kingdom) Neil Hodgson	(United Kingdom) Neil Hodgson	(United Kingdom) Neil Hodgson	Fila Ducati	Report
2	R1	(Australia) Phillip Island	30 March	(United Kingdom) Neil Hodgson	(United Kingdom) Neil Hodgson	(United Kingdom) Neil Hodgson	Fila Ducati	Report
2	R2	(Australia) Phillip Island	30 March	(United Kingdom) Neil Hodgson	(Spain) Rubén Xaus	(United Kingdom) Neil Hodgson	Fila Ducati	Report
3	R1	(Japan) Sugo	27 April	(France) Régis Laconi	(United Kingdom) Neil Hodgson	(United Kingdom) Neil Hodgson	Fila Ducati	Report
3	R2	(Japan) Sugo	27 April	(France) Régis Laconi	(Italy) Pierfrancesco Chili	(United Kingdom) Neil Hodgson	Fila Ducati	Report
4	R1	(Italy) Monza	18 May	(United Kingdom) Neil Hodgson	(United Kingdom) Neil Hodgson	(United Kingdom) Neil Hodgson	Fila Ducati	Report
4	R2	(Italy) Monza	18 May	(United Kingdom) Neil Hodgson	(France) Régis Laconi	(United Kingdom) Neil Hodgson	Fila Ducati	Report
5	R1	(Germany) Oschersleben	1 June	(United Kingdom) Neil Hodgson	(Italy) Pierfrancesco Chili	(United Kingdom) Neil Hodgson	Fila Ducati	Report
5	R2	(Germany) Oschersleben	1 June	(United Kingdom) Neil Hodgson	(United Kingdom) Neil Hodgson	(United Kingdom) James Toseland	HM Plant Ducati	Report
6	R1	(United Kingdom) Silverstone	15 June	(United Kingdom) Neil Hodgson	(Spain) Gregorio Lavilla	(United Kingdom) Neil Hodgson	Fila Ducati	Report
6	R2	(United Kingdom) Silverstone	15 June	(United Kingdom) Neil Hodgson	(Spain) Gregorio Lavilla	(United Kingdom) Neil Hodgson	Fila Ducati	Report
7	R1	(San Marino) Misano	22 June	(United Kingdom) Neil Hodgson	(Spain) Rubén Xaus	(Spain) Rubén Xaus	Fila Ducati	Report
7	R2	(San Marino) Misano	22 June	(United Kingdom) Neil Hodgson	(Spain) Rubén Xaus	(Spain) Rubén Xaus	Fila Ducati	Report
8	R1	(United States) Mazda Raceway Laguna Seca	13 July	(Australia) Mat Mladin	(France) Régis Laconi	(Italy) Pierfrancesco Chili	Team PSG-1	Report
8	R2	(United States) Mazda Raceway Laguna Seca	13 July	(Australia) Mat Mladin	(Spain) Rubén Xaus	(Spain) Rubén Xaus	Fila Ducati	Report
9	R1	(Europe) Brands Hatch	27 July	(United Kingdom) John Reynolds	(United Kingdom) Shane Byrne	(United Kingdom) Shane Byrne	Monstermob Ducati	Report
9	R2	(Europe) Brands Hatch	27 July	(United Kingdom) John Reynolds	(United Kingdom) John Reynolds	(United Kingdom) Shane Byrne	Monstermob Ducati	Report
10	R1	(Netherlands) Assen	7 September	(Italy) Pierfrancesco Chili	(Spain) Gregorio Lavilla	(Spain) Rubén Xaus	Fila Ducati	Report
10	R2	(Netherlands) Assen	7 September	(Italy) Pierfrancesco Chili	(United Kingdom) Neil Hodgson	(United Kingdom) Neil Hodgson	Fila Ducati	Report
11	R1	(Italy) Imola	28 September	(Spain) Rubén Xaus	(United Kingdom) Neil Hodgson	(Spain) Rubén Xaus	Fila Ducati	Report
11	R2	(Italy) Imola	28 September	(Spain) Rubén Xaus	(Spain) Rubén Xaus	(Spain) Rubén Xaus	Fila Ducati	Report
12	R1	(France) Magny-Cours	19 October	(United Kingdom) James Toseland	(United Kingdom) Neil Hodgson	(United Kingdom) Neil Hodgson	Fila Ducati	Report
12	R2	(France) Magny-Cours	19 October	(United Kingdom) James Toseland	(United Kingdom) Neil Hodgson	(Spain) Rubén Xaus	Fila Ducati	Report

== Championship standings ==
=== Riders' standings ===
2003 final riders' standings
Pos.	Rider	Bike	ESP (Spain)		AUS (Australia)		JPN (Japan)		ITA (Italy)		GER (Germany)		GBR (United Kingdom)		SMR (San Marino)		USA (United States)		EUR (Europe)		NED (Netherlands)		ITA (Italy)		FRA (France)		Pts
Pos.	Rider	Bike	R1	R2	R1	R2	R1	R2	R1	R2	R1	R2	R1	R2	R1	R2	R1	R2	R1	R2	R1	R2	R1	R2	R1	R2	Pts
1	(United Kingdom) Neil Hodgson	Ducati	**1**	**1**	**1**	**1**	1	1	**1**	**1**	**1**	**2**	**1**	**1**	**Ret**	**2**	2	2	2	5	2	1	2	4	1	Ret	489
2	(Spain) Rubén Xaus	Ducati	2	2	2	2	4	4	7	Ret	Ret	5	3	3	1	1	Ret	1	Ret	4	1	2	**1**	**1**	2	1	386
3	(United Kingdom) James Toseland	Ducati	4	3	DSQ	5	3	5	4	5	3	1	2	4	2	Ret	3	Ret	6	3	4	Ret	Ret	Ret	**5**	**2**	271
4	(France) Régis Laconi	Ducati	5	Ret	6	4	**2**	**7**	2	4	4	4	4	6	3	4	Ret	4	4	8	Ret	4	3	2	6	16	267
5	(Spain) Gregorio Lavilla	Suzuki	7	6	3	7	5	2	3	2	Ret	Ret	Ret	2	4	5	Ret	5	7	6	Ret	3	4	3	4	4	256
6	(United Kingdom) Chris Walker	Ducati	3	4	7	6	Ret	Ret	6	6	5	3	9	8	5	8	5	3	3	Ret	5	8	Ret	5	3	3	234
7	(Italy) Pierfrancesco Chili	Ducati	Ret	Ret	Ret	3	Ret	3	5	3	2	11	7	7	Ret	3	1	Ret	9	7	**3**	**5**	5	Ret	Ret	Ret	197
8	(Australia) Steve Martin	Ducati	6	5	4	9	15	Ret	9	7	6	6	Ret	Ret	6	9	Ret	Ret	14	Ret	9	11	6	Ret	7	5	139
9	(Italy) Lucio Pedercini	Ducati	8	9	10	14	7	Ret	10	10	9	10	11	11	8	6	Ret	10	Ret	16	12	14	Ret	6	Ret	11	112
10	(Italy) Marco Borciani	Ducati	9	10	9	10	13	13	8	8	7	9	10	13	11	14	10	9	Ret	14	Ret	13	10	11	Ret	14	111
11	(Italy) Mauro Sanchini	Kawasaki	Ret	13	13	12	11	10	14	12	11	12	13	14	9	11	9	8	15	15	10	12	8	8	10	10	108
12	(Australia) Troy Corser	Petronas	Ret	7	5	8	Ret	12	13	Ret	12	14	16	Ret	7	10	8	Ret	Ret	Ret	6	9	7	7	8	Ret	107
13	(Spain) Juan Borja	Ducati	14	8	12	15	10	9	DNS	DNS	Ret	7	Ret	Ret	Ret	12	11	7	12	Ret	Ret	16	11	9	9	7	87
14	(Italy) Ivan Clementi	Kawasaki	11	14	11	11	Ret	8	Ret	Ret	Ret	13	14	16	10	13	Ret	Ret	13	13	8	7	9	Ret	Ret	9	76
15	(Italy) Giovanni Bussei	Yamaha	Ret	11	14	Ret	12	11	Ret	13	10	Ret	12	12	16	16											52
15	(Italy) Giovanni Bussei	Ducati															7	6									52
16	(United Kingdom) Shane Byrne	Ducati																	1	1							50
17	(United Kingdom) John Reynolds	Suzuki											6	10					**Ret**	**2**	Ret	10					42
18	(Italy) Vittorio Iannuzzo	Suzuki							12	9	8	8	Ret	15	Ret	7					DNS	DNS					37
19	(Italy) Alessandro Gramigni	Yamaha	Ret	DNS					11	11					12	15			16	11	11	15	13	12	Ret	12	37
20	(Japan) Yukio Kagayama	Suzuki											5	5					10	9							35
21	(United Kingdom) Leon Haslam	Ducati																	Ret	10	7	6			Ret	6	35
22	(Spain) David García	Ducati	10	12	8	Ret	DNS	DNS					DNS	DNS	DNS	DNS	Ret	Ret			DNS	DNS	12	10	Ret	Ret	28
23	(United Kingdom) Michael Rutter	Ducati											8	9					8	Ret							23
24	(Japan) Hitoyasu Izutsu	Honda					6	6																			20
25	(Australia) Mat Mladin	Suzuki															**4**	**DNS**									13
26	(United Kingdom) James Haydon	Petronas	12	Ret	15	16	9	Ret	Ret	Ret	Ret	DNS					Ret	Ret	17	Ret	DNS	DNS	Ret	Ret	Ret	Ret	12
27	(Spain) Sergio Fuertes	Suzuki	15	Ret					16	Ret			17	17	15	16			Ret	17	Ret	Ret	14	13	11	Ret	12
28	(United Kingdom) Sean Emmett	Ducati																	5	Ret							11
29	(Italy) Nello Russo	Ducati	13	15	16	13					13	Ret	15	18	Ret	Ret											11
30	(United States) Aaron Yates	Suzuki															6	Ret									10
31	(United Kingdom) Dean Ellison	Ducati																	11	12							9
32	(France) Sébastien Gimbert	Suzuki																							Ret	8	8
33	(Japan) Atsushi Watanabe	Suzuki					8	Ret																			8
34	(Italy) Serafino Foti	Ducati	Ret	Ret					15	14	14	15	Ret	Ret	14	Ret											8
35	(Italy) Walter Tortoroglio	Honda	Ret	16	Ret	17	Ret	15	Ret	15	Ret	18	Ret	Ret	Ret	Ret	12	Ret	Ret	Ret	Ret	DNS	18	16			6
36	(France) Bertrand Stey	Honda																							13	13	6
37	(Austria) Horst Saiger	Yamaha																			13	Ret	17	14	15	17	6
38	(Austria) Christian Zaiser	Aprilia													Ret	DNS											4
38	(Austria) Christian Zaiser	Suzuki																							12	Ret	4
39	(Japan) Kenichiro Nakamura	Honda					14	14																			4
40	(Italy) Luca Pedersoli	Ducati															13	Ret	Ret	Ret	Ret	Ret	19	Ret			3
41	(Italy) Paolo Blora	Ducati													13	17											3
42	(France) Frédéric Protat	Yamaha																							14	15	3
43	(Italy) Gianmaria Liverani	Yamaha																			14	19	20	Ret			2
44	(Italy) Luca Pini	Suzuki													17	19							15	15			2
45	(Czech Republic) Jiří Mrkývka	Ducati							DNQ	DNQ	15	17			Ret	Ret	Ret	Ret	Ret	Ret	15	Ret	Ret	Ret	DNQ	DNQ	2
Pos.	Rider	Bike	ESP (Spain)		AUS (Australia)		JPN (Japan)		ITA (Italy)		GER (Germany)		GBR (United Kingdom)		SMR (San Marino)		USA (United States)		EUR (Europe)		NED (Netherlands)		ITA (Italy)		FRA (France)		Pts

Colour	Result
Gold	Winner
Silver	Second place
Bronze	Third place
Green	Points classification
Blue	Non-points classification
Blue	Non-classified finish (NC)
Purple	Retired, not classified (Ret)
Red	Did not qualify (DNQ)
Red	Did not pre-qualify (DNPQ)
Black	Disqualified (DSQ)
White	Did not start (DNS)
White	Withdrew (WD)
White	Race cancelled (C)
Blank	Did not practice (DNP)
Blank	Did not arrive (DNA)
Blank	Excluded (EX)

**Bold** – Pole position
Italics – Fastest lap

=== Manufacturers' standings ===
2003 final manufacturers' standings
Pos.	Manufacturer	ESP (Spain)		AUS (Australia)		JPN (Japan)		ITA (Italy)		GER (Germany)		GBR (United Kingdom)		SMR (San Marino)		USA (United States)		EUR (Europe)		NED (Netherlands)		ITA (Italy)		FRA (France)		Pts
Pos.	Manufacturer	R1	R2	R1	R2	R1	R2	R1	R2	R1	R2	R1	R2	R1	R2	R1	R2	R1	R2	R1	R2	R1	R2	R1	R2	Pts
1	(Italy) Ducati	1	1	1	1	1	1	1	1	1	1	1	1	1	1	1	1	1	1	1	1	1	1	1	1	600
2	(Japan) Suzuki	7	6	3	7	5	2	3	2	8	8	5	2	4	5	4	5	7	2	16	3	4	3	4	4	306
3	(Japan) Kawasaki	11	13	11	11	11	8	14	12	11	12	13	14	9	11	9	8	13	13	8	7	8	8	10	9	130
4	(Malaysia) Petronas	12	7	5	8	9	12	13	Ret	12	14	16	Ret	7	10	8	Ret	17	Ret	6	9	7	7	8	Ret	118
5	(Japan) Yamaha	16	11	14	Ret	12	11	11	11	10	19	12	12	12	15			16	11	11	15	13	12	14	12	69
6	(Japan) Honda	Ret	16	19	20	6	6	Ret	15	Ret	18	Ret	Ret	Ret	Ret	12	Ret	Ret	Ret	Ret	DNS	18	16	13	13	31
	(Italy) Aprilia													Ret	DNS											0
Pos.	Manufacturer	ESP (Spain)		AUS (Australia)		JPN (Japan)		ITA (Italy)		GER (Germany)		GBR (United Kingdom)		SMR (San Marino)		USA (United States)		EUR (Europe)		NED (Netherlands)		ITA (Italy)		FRA (France)		Pts
