= Eric Bostrom =

American motorcycle racer (born 1976)

- Born: November 19, 1976 (age 49); San Francisco, California, United States
- Nationality: American
Statistics
AMA Superbike Championship
Active years	2004–2005, 2007–2008, 2010–2011
Championships	0
Team(s)	Ducati, Yamaha, Suzuki, Kawasaki
Last season (2011)	29th
Starts / Wins / Podiums / Poles / F. laps / Points; 78 / 4 / 11 / 0 / 1 / 1645

Eric Bostrom (born November 19, 1976, in San Francisco, California) is an American professional motorcycle racer and brother of Ben Bostrom, who also races motorcycles professionally.

Bostrom raced in the AMA Superbike series for Attack Kawasaki, but he is better known for being a member of the Austin Ducati and Parts Unlimited Ducati teams in 2004 and 2005, and perhaps best known for riding for the factory Kawasaki team from 1999 to 2003. Bostrom raced for Erion Honda in 1998 and Zero Gravity Racing in 1997.

Statistically, Bostrom's best season was the 2001 season. Riding for Kawasaki, he finished a close second to Mat Mladin in the AMA Superbike series and won the AMA Supersport Championship.

== Timeline ==
Bostrom won the Progressive Insurance Harley-Davidson SuperTwins Championship in 1997, winning 10 of the 11 series races.

Bostrom's AMA Superbike career began in 1998 when he replaced the injured Miguel Duhamel on the Erion Honda, winning his second and third races in the class. He was entered in several Superbike World Championship races as well. Bostrom also won the AMA Formula Xtreme Championship in 1998 riding for the Erion Honda team.

Bostrom raced for Kawasaki from 1999 to 2003 riding the ZX-7R in the AMA Superbike Championship. He also rode the ZX-6R in the AMA Supersport Championship, winning the AMA Supersport championship in 2001. In 2001, Bostrom finished second in the AMA Superbike Championship to Mat Mladin. He also finished second in the AMA Superbike Championship in 2002, this time behind Nicky Hayden. During his career at Kawasaki, Bostrom was able to compete in several World Superbike events. This, coupled with his back-to-back second-place finishes in AMA's highest class lead many observers to believe a transfer to World Superbike, or possibly MotoGP was in Bostrom's future. Injuries marred his 2003 season and Kawasaki pulled out of AMA competitions.

Bostrom rode the Austin Ducati in the AMA Superbike Championship in 2004 and the Parts Unlimited Ducati in 2005. He was the sole AMA Superbike Ducati rider in 2004. Former Superbike World Champion Neil Hodgson joined the Parts Unlimited Ducati AMA Superbike team for the 2005 season. Bostrom's brother, Ben, took his spot on the Ducati team after Eric left for Yamaha after the 2005 season ended. By the end of the 2006 season, Ducati pulled out of all AMA competitions.

Bostrom joined the factory Yamaha team before the 2006 season to ride in the AMA Supersport Championship and AMA Formula Xtreme Championship. His factory Yamaha teammate was Jason DiSalvo. For the 2007 and 2008 seasons, Bostrom rode for Yamaha, competing in AMA Superbike riding and developing the Yamaha YZF-R1 Superbike alongside DiSalvo.

Bostrom did not race motorcycles professionally during 2009.

During 2010, Bostrom rode part-time in the AMA Daytona Sportbike and Superbike classes for Cycle World Attack Performance Yoshimura Suzuki.

In July 2012, Bostrom raced for Team Icon Brammo at the TTXGP FIM e-Power race at Mazda Raceway Laguna Seca, riding the Brammo Empulse RR electric motorcycle.

== Superbike World Championship ==
Bostrom has also raced in the Superbike World Championship, usually as a wildcard entry in the United States rounds at Laguna Seca. In 1999, he finished tenth and seventh, and in 2001, he finished fifth twice. In the 2002 season, Bostrom was entered at five meetings as a third rider in the Kawasaki World Superbike team, with his best results being sixth and fourth in the US. He also appeared at Laguna in 2003, but an accident caused by Aaron Yates in the second turn of the first lap prevented him taking any further part in the action.

Bostrom and his brothers are also very engaged with 2Wheel Tuner, a leading magazine editorial based around the Sportbike community. Each month they write an article entitled "Boz Bros Chronicles" which follows their travels from racing to 24hr mountain bike races and their trips around the world.

== Career statistics ==
- 2013 - 1st in FIM eRoad Racing World Cup (American Series)
- 2008 - 4th in AMA Superbike Championship
- 2007 - 7th in AMA Superbike Championship
- 2006 - 2nd in AMA Formula Xtreme Championship
- 2005 - 3rd in AMA Superbike Championship
- 2004 - 4th in AMA Superbike Championship
- 2003 - 7th in AMA Superbike Championship
- 2002 - 2nd in AMA Superbike Championship
- 2001 - 1st in AMA Supersport Championship
- 2001 - 2nd in AMA Superbike Championship
- 2000 - 2nd in AMA Supersport Championship
- 2000 - 4th in AMA Superbike Championship
- 1999 - 7th in AMA Superbike Championship
- 1999 - 9th in AMA Supersport Championship
- 1998 - 1st in AMA Formula Xtreme Championship
- 1998 - 3rd in AMA Supersport Championship
- 1997 - 1st in AMA Super twins Series
- 1996 - 1st in AMA Harley-Davidson 883 Dirt Track

=== MotoAmerica SuperBike Championship ===
==== By year ====
Year	Class	Team	1		2		3		4		5		6		7	8		9		10		11		Pos	Pts
Year	Class	Team	R1	R2	R1	R2	R1	R2	R1	R2	R1	R2	R1	R2	R1	R1	R2	R1	R2	R1	R2	R1	R2	Pos	Pts
2004	SuperBike	Ducati	DAY; 25		FON; 2	FON; 2	INF; 5	INF; Ret	BAR; 4	BAR; 7	PPK; 1		RAM; 5	RAM; 6	BRD; 4	LAG; 5		M-O; 7	M-O; 7	RAT; Ret	RAT; DNS	VIR; DNS	VIR; DNS	7th	336
2005	SuperBike	Ducati	DAY; 11		BAR; 8	BAR; 5	FON; 5	FON; 4	INF; 10	INF; 7	PPK; 1		RAM; Ret	RAM; 4	LAG; 1	M-O; 3	M-O; 1	VIR; 6	VIR; 7	RAT; 5	RAT; 8			3rd	431
2007	SuperBike	Yamaha	DAY; 21		BAR; 8	BAR; 6	FON; 3	FON; 3	INF; 15	INF; 7	RAM; 6	RAM; 9	MIL; Ret	MIL; Ret	LAG; 9	OHI; 6	OHI; 7	VIR; 6	VIR; 15	RAT; Ret	RAT; 10	LAG; 5		7th	362
2008	SuperBike	Yamaha	DAY; 25		BAR; 7	BAR; 6	FON; 5	FON; 6	INF; 4	INF; 6	MIL; 6	MIL; 9	RAM; 8	RAM; 5	LAG; 9	OHI; 7	OHI; 20	VIR; 3	VIR; 3	RAT; 5	RAT; 6	LAG; 6		4th	445
2010	SuperBike	Suzuki	DAY	DAY	FON	FON	RAT	RAT	INF	INF	RAM	RAM	MOH; 8	MOH; 13	LAG; 7	VIR; 7	VIR; Ret	NJE	NJE	BAR; 12	BAR; DNS			19th	58
2011	SuperBike	Kawasaki	DAY; Ret	DAY; 8	INF	INF	UTA		RAM	RAM	BAR	BAR	MOH	MOH	LAG	NJE	NJE							29th	13

=== MotoAmerica Superstock Championship ===
==== By year ====
Year	Class	Bike	1	2	3	4	5	6	7	8	9	10	11	Pos	Pts
2006	Superstock	Yamaha	DAY; Ret	BAR; 6	FON; 5	INF; 3	RAM; 29	MIL; 8	LAG; 3	OHI; 2	VIR; 1	RAT; 2	OHI; 7	6th	262

=== AMA Formula Xtreme Championship ===
==== By year ====
Year	Class	Bike	1	2	3	4	5	6	7	8	9	10	11	Pos	Pts
2006	Formula Xtreme	Yamaha	DAY; 4	BAR; 22	FON; 1	INF; 1	RAM; 1	MIL; 3	LAG; 1	OHI; 1	VIR; 1	RAT; 2	OHI; 2	2nd	351

=== FIM eRoad Racing World Cup ===
Year	Team	1	2	Pos	Pts
2013	Icon Brammo	LAG; 1	IND; 2	1st	45
