= Robertino Pietri =

Venezuelan professional motorcycle racer (born 1985)

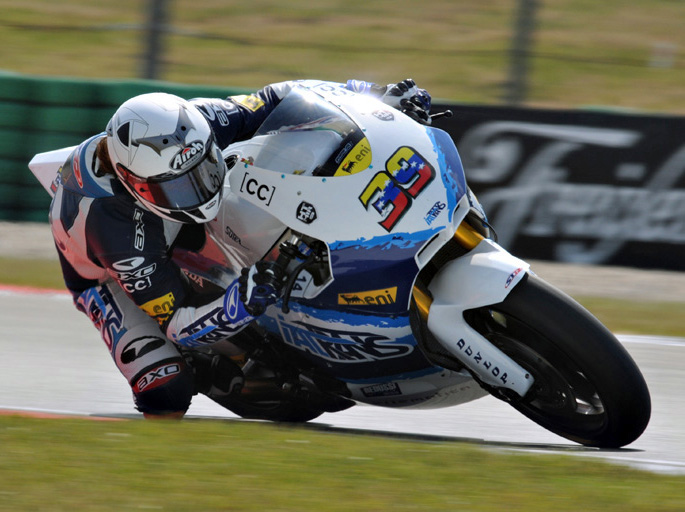
- Pietri at the 2010 Dutch TT
- Nationality: Venezuelan
- Born: 6 May 1985 (age 41); Puerto la Cruz, Venezuela
Motorcycle racing career statistics
Moto2 World Championship
Active years	2010–2011
Manufacturers	Suter
Starts / Wins / Podiums / Poles / F. laps / Points; 34 / 0 / 0 / 0 / 0 / 1
Superbike World Championship
Active years	2007
Manufacturers	Yamaha
Starts / Wins / Podiums / Poles / F. laps / Points; 2 / 0 / 0 / 0 / 0 / 2

Roberto David Pietri Chiossone (better known as Robertino Pietri, born 6 May 1985) is a Venezuelan professional motorcycle racer.

== Motorcycle racing career ==
Born in Puerto la Cruz, Venezuela, Pietri has competed in the 2007 Monza Superbike World Championship round and in two Moto2 World Championship seasons, as well as in the AMA Superbike, Superstock and Daytona SportBike championships. He is son of a former professional motorcycle racer, Roberto Pietri.

== Career statistics ==
=== MotoAmerica SuperBike Championship ===
==== Races by year ====
Year	Class	Team	1	2		3		4		5		6		7	8		9		10		11	Pos	Pts
Year	Class	Team	R1	R1	R2	R1	R2	R1	R2	R1	R2	R1	R2	R1	R1	R2	R1	R2	R1	R2	R1	Pos	Pts
2006	SuperBike	Suzuki	DAY; Ret	BAR	BAR	FON	FON	INF	INF	RAM	RAM	MIL; 15	MIL; 16	LAG; 20	OHI; 15	OHI	VIR	VIR	RAT	RAT	OHI	30th	58

=== MotoAmerica Superstock Championship ===
==== By year ====
Year	Class	Bike	1	2	3	4	5	6	7	8	9	10	11	Pos	Pts
2006	Superstock	Suzuki	DAY; 7	BAR; 21	FON; 15	INF; 17	RAM; 16	MIL; 15	LAG; 17	OHI; 14	VIR; 16	RAT; 17	OHI; 29	15th	166
2007	Superstock	Suzuki	DAY	BAR; 13	FON; 10	INF; 9	RAM; 7	MIL; 4	LAG	OHI	VIR	RAT; 12	LAG; 10	10th	155

=== AMA Superbike Championship ===
Year	Class	Team	1	2		3		4		5		6		7	8		9		10		11	Pos	Pts
Year	Class	Team	R1	R1	R2	R1	R2	R1	R2	R1	R2	R1	R2	R1	R1	R2	R1	R2	R1	R2	R1	Pos	Pts
2008	SuperBike	Suzuki	DAY; Ret	BAR; Ret	BAR; Ret	FON; Ret	FON; Ret	INF; Ret	INF; Ret	MIL	MIL	RAM; 14	RAM; Ret	LAG	OHI	OHI	VIR	VIR	RAT	RAT	LAG	35th	17

=== Superbike World Championship ===
==== Races by year ====
(key)

Year	Bike	1		2		3		4		5		6		7		8		9		10		11		12		13		Pos.	Pts
Year	Bike	R1	R2	R1	R2	R1	R2	R1	R2	R1	R2	R1	R2	R1	R2	R1	R2	R1	R2	R1	R2	R1	R2	R1	R2	R1	R2	Pos.	Pts
2007	Yamaha	QAT	QAT	AUS	AUS	EUR	EUR	SPA	SPA	NED	NED	ITA; Ret	ITA; 14	GBR	GBR	SMR	SMR	CZE	CZE	GBR	GBR	GER	GER	ITA	ITA	FRA	FRA	29th	2

=== Grand Prix motorcycle racing ===
==== By season ====
Season	Class	Motorcycle	Team	Number	Race	Win	Podium	Pole	FLap	Pts	Plcd
2010	Moto2	Suter	Italtrans S.T.R.	39	17	0	0	0	0	1	39th
2011	Moto2	Suter	Italtrans Racing Team	39	17	0	0	0	0	0	NC
Total					34	0	0	0	0	1	

==== Races by year ====
(key)

Year	Class	Bike	1	2	3	4	5	6	7	8	9	10	11	12	13	14	15	16	17	Pos.	Pts
2010	Moto2	Suter	QAT; 28	SPA; 24	FRA; 23	ITA; Ret	GBR; 27	NED; 26	CAT; Ret	GER; Ret	CZE; 29	INP; 21	RSM; 29	ARA; Ret	JPN; 31	MAL; 27	AUS; 27	POR; 15	VAL; Ret	39th	1
2011	Moto2	Suter	QAT; 29	SPA; Ret	POR; 23	FRA; 30	CAT; Ret	GBR; 23	NED; 26	ITA; 26	GER; 26	CZE; 25	INP; 32	RSM; Ret	ARA; 30	JPN; 25	AUS; Ret	MAL; 22	VAL; 24	NC	0
