= AMA Supersport Championship =

MotoAmerica Supersport Championship
- Current season, competition or edition: 2026 MotoAmerica Supersport Championship
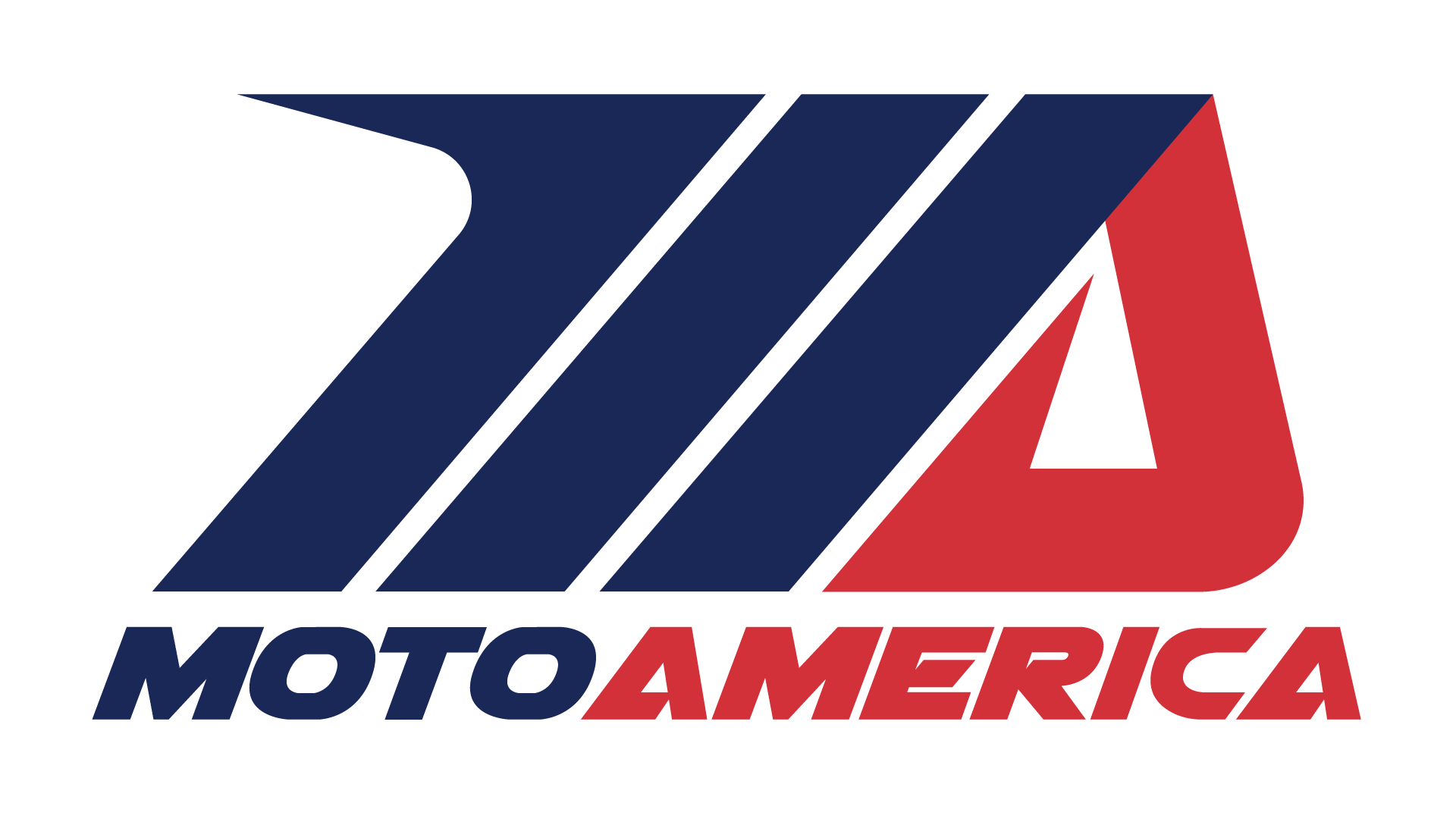
- Sport: Motorcycle sport
- Founded: 1987
- No. of teams: 10
- Country: United States
- Most recent champion: (South Africa) Mathew Scholtz

AMA Supersport, now known as MotoAmerica Supersport Championship, is an American motorcycle racing series. The race series was founded and sanctioned by the American Motorcyclist Association (AMA) in 1987.

This racing series is placed directly below the MotoAmerica Superbike championship, described by the organization as “MotoAmerica’s middleweight championship, the Supersport class features the series’ rising stars competing aboard production-based motorcycles that are slightly less powerful than Superbikes, but are no less exciting to watch.”

What was formerly known as AMA Pro Supersport became the Superstock 600 class in 2015 (eventually being dropped altogether) and featured homologated production bikes with engines sized up to 600cc, four stroke, four cylinder engines. The Daytona Sportbike class evolved into the MotoAmerica Supersport class, taking on the FIM Supersport regulations as the MotoAmerica organization sought to simplify the amount of work manufacturers needed to do to enter the series and thus attract more involvement in North American road racing. Before being dropped altogether, the Superstock 600 and Supersport classes were run together due to the low number of entrants in the Supersport class.

The Supersport class now features several manufacturers bringing bikes into competition with a variety of engine types and sizes following the new Next Generation Supersport regulations and homologation rules.

== Next Generation SuperSport Regulations ==
Engine

- Over 400cc up to 636cc 4 stroke 4 cylinders
- Over 500cc up to 800cc 4 stroke 3 cylinders
- Over 600cc up to 955cc 4 stroke 2 cylinders

Weight

The combined minimum weight (bike and rider in full racing equipment) is 239kg, except for the Kawasaki ZX-6R which is 242kg and the Ducati Panigale V2 at 244kg.

== Champions ==
Season	Champion
1987	(United States) Doug Polen
1988	(United States) Doug Polen
1989	(United States) Scott Zampach
1990	(United States) David Sadowski
1991	(Canada) Miguel Duhamel
1992	(United States) Tom Kipp
1993	(Canada) Miguel Duhamel
1994	(United States) Jamie James
1995	(Canada) Miguel Duhamel
1996	(Canada) Miguel Duhamel
1997	(Canada) Miguel Duhamel
1998	(Canada) Steve Crevier
1999	(United States) Nicky Hayden
2000	(United States) Kurtis Roberts
2001	(United States) Eric Bostrom
2002	(United States) Aaron Yates
2003	(United States) Jamie Hacking
2004	(United States) Tommy Hayden
2005	(United States) Tommy Hayden
2006	(United States) Jamie Hacking
2007	(United States) Roger Lee Hayden
2008	(United States) Ben Bostrom
2009	East: (United States) Josh Day; West: (United States) Ricky Parker; National: (Argentina) Leandro Mercado
2010	East: (United States) J. D. Beach; West: (United States) Joey Pascarella; National: (United States) Austin DeHaven
2011	East: (United States) James Rispoli; West: (Colombia) David Gaviria; National: (United States) James Rispoli
2012	East: (United States) Jake Lewis; West: (United States) James Rispoli; National: (United States) James Rispoli
2013	East: (United States) Corey Alexander; West: (Colombia) Tomás Puerta; National: (Colombia) Tomás Puerta
2014	(United States) Hayden Gillim
2015	(United States) J. D. Beach
2016	(United States) Garrett Gerloff
2017	(United States) Garrett Gerloff
2018	(United States) J. D. Beach
2019	(United States) Bobby Fong
2020	(Mexico) Richie Escalante
2021	(United States) Sean Dylan Kelly
2022	(United States) Josh Herrin
2023	(Spain) Xavi Fores
2024	(South Africa) Mathew Scholtz
2025	(South Africa) Mathew Scholtz
2026	(South Africa) Darryn Binder

== Circuits ==
AMA Superbike Championship circuits as of 2025.
Red dots: Current circuits
Orange dots: Recently visited circuits
Blue dots: Former circuits

The Supersport class shares the same circuits as the superbike class and have raced at these locations within the past 5 years:

- Barber Motorsports Park (Leeds, Alabama)
- Michelin Raceway Road Atlanta (Braselton, Georgia)
- Brainerd International Raceway (Brainerd, Minnesota)
- Pittsburgh International Race Complex (Wampum, Pennsylvania)
- Road America (Elkhart Lake, Wisconsin)
- Ridge Motorsports Park (Shelton, Washington)
- Weathertech Raceway Laguna Seca (Salinas, California)
- Virginia International Raceway (Alton, Virginia)
- Mid-Ohio Sports Car Course (Lexington, Ohio)
- Circuit of the Americas (Del Valle, Texas)
- New Jersey Motorsports Park (Millville, New Jersey)

== Teams/Manufacturers ==
Team	Bike
BPR Racing Yamaha	Yamaha YZF-R9
MP13 Racing/One Cure Racing	MV Agusta F3RR
Rahal Ducati Moto with Desnuda Organic Tequila	Ducati Panigale V2
Rahal Ducati Moto with Droplight	Ducati Panigale V2
Rahal Ducati Moto with Roller Die + Forming	Ducati Panigale V2
Liberty Yamaha Racing	Yamaha YZF-R9
Altus Motorsports	Yamaha YZF-R9
M4 ECSTAR Suzuki	Suzuki GSX-R750
TopPro Motorsports/Edge Racing	Ducati Panigale V2
Rodio Racing	Ducati Panigale V2
BPR Racing Yamaha	Yamaha YZF-R9
Superbike Supply	Suzuki GSX-R750
Donut Racing	Suzuki GSX-R750
Celtic/Economy Lube + Tire/Warhorse	Ducati Panigale V2
Horney Racing	Suzuki GSX-R750
Ducati Pittsburgh/Mosites Motorsports	Ducati Panigale V2
Strack Racing	Yamaha YZF-R9
Shane Maggs Racing	Suzuki GSX-R750
Chase Black Racing	Ducati Panigale V2

== See also ==
- AMA Superbike Championship
- AMA Pro Daytona Sportbike Championship
