= Aaron Yates (motorcyclist) =

American motorcycle racer

- Nationality: American
- Born: December 13, 1973 (age 52); Milledgeville, Georgia
Motorcycle racing career statistics
MotoGP World Championship
Active years	2012
Manufacturers	BCL
2012 championship position	NC (0 pts)
Starts / Wins / Podiums / Poles / F. laps / Points; 1 / 0 / 0 / 0 / 0 / 0
Superbike World Championship
Active years	1997–1998, 2002–2003, 2014
Manufacturers	Suzuki, EBR
Championships	0
2014 championship position	NC (0 pts)
Starts / Wins / Podiums / Poles / F. laps / Points; 29 / 0 / 0 / 0 / 0 / 34

Aaron Yates (born December 13, 1973, in Milledgeville, Georgia, United States) is an American motorcycle racer. He won the AMA 750 Supersport Championship in 1996, the AMA Supersport Championship in 2002 and the AMA Superstock Championship in 2005 and 2008.

== Career statistics ==
=== Superbike World Championship ===
==== Races by year ====
Year	Make	1		2		3		4		5		6		7		8		9		10		11		12		13		Pos.	Pts
Year	Make	R1	R2	R1	R2	R1	R2	R1	R2	R1	R2	R1	R2	R1	R2	R1	R2	R1	R2	R1	R2	R1	R2	R1	R2	R1	R2	Pos.	Pts
1997	Suzuki	AUS	AUS	SMR	SMR	GBR	GBR	GER	GER	ITA	ITA	USA; Ret	USA; 11	EUR	EUR	AUT	AUT	NED	NED	SPA	SPA	JPN	JPN	INA	INA			44th	5
1998	Suzuki	AUS	AUS	GBR	GBR	ITA	ITA	SPA	SPA	GER	GER	SMR	SMR	RSA	RSA	USA; 12	USA; Ret	EUR	EUR	AUT	AUT	NED	NED	JPN	JPN			48th	2
2002	Suzuki	SPA	SPA	AUS	AUS	RSA	RSA	JPN	JPN	ITA	ITA	GBR	GBR	GER	GER	SMR	SMR	USA; 7	USA; 8	GBR	GBR	GER	GER	NED	NED	ITA	ITA	24th	17
2003	Suzuki	SPA	SPA	AUS	AUS	JPN	JPN	ITA	ITA	GER	GER	GBR	GBR	SMR	SMR	USA; 6	USA; Ret	GBR	GBR	NED	NED	ITA	ITA	FRA	FRA			30th	10
2014	EBR	AUS; 17	AUS; 20	SPA; 17	SPA; 19	NED; Ret	NED; DNS	ITA; Ret	ITA; Ret	GBR; 17	GBR; Ret	MAL; 16	MAL; 20	ITA; Ret	ITA; DNS	POR; 16	POR; Ret	USA; Ret	USA; DNS	SPA; Ret	SPA; 16	FRA; Ret	FRA; Ret	QAT; Ret	QAT; Ret			NC	0

=== MotoAmerica SuperBike Championship ===
Year	Class	Team	1		2		3		4		5		6		7	8		9		10		11		Pos	Pts
Year	Class	Team	R1	R1	R2	R1	R2	R1	R2	R1	R2	R1	R2	R1	R1	R2	R1	R2	R1	R2	R1	R2		Pos	Pts
2004	SuperBike	Suzuki	DAY; 23		FON; DNS	FON; DNS	INF; 10	INF; 3	BAR; Ret	BAR; 4	PPK; 3		RAM; 7	RAM; 4	BRD; 7	LAG; 4		M-O; 3	M-O; 4	RAT; 5	RAT; Ret	VIR; 2	VIR; 2	6th	363
2005	SuperBike	Suzuki	DAY; 4		BAR; 2	BAR; 8	FON; 2	FON; 3	INF; 2	INF; 2	PPK; 2		RAM; Ret	RAM; 5	LAG; 3	M-O; Ret	M-O; 9	VIR; 3	VIR; 2	RAT; Ret	RAT; 1			4th	414
2006	SuperBike	Suzuki	DAY; 6		BAR; 7	BAR; 4	FON; 4	FON; 8	INF; 4	INF; 5	RAM; 6	RAM; 6	MIL; 6	MIL; 7	LAG; 5	OHI; 4	OHI; 27	VIR; 5	VIR; 2	RAT; 3	RAT; 3	OHI; 2		4th	484
2007	SuperBike	Suzuki	DAY; 11		BAR; 4	BAR; 5	FON; 7	FON; 9	INF; 11	INF; 14	RAM; 17	RAM; 4	MIL; 8	MIL; 8	LAG; 3	OHI; 4	OHI; 4	VIR; 4	VIR; 3	RAT; 4	RAT; 4	LAG; 3		4th	465
2008	SuperBike	Suzuki	DAY; 6		BAR; 20	BAR; 7	FON; 11	FON; Ret	INF; 5	INF; 4	MIL; 4	MIL; 5	RAM; 6	RAM; 8	LAG; 3	OHI	OHI	VIR	VIR	RAT	RAT	LAG		9th	234
2009	SuperBike	Suzuki	DAY; 7		FON; 15	FON; 10	RAT; 6	RAT; 5	BAR; 10	BAR; 2	INF; 4	INF; 21	RAM; 6	RAM; 3	LAG; 3	OHI; 2	OHI; 23	HRT; 5	HRT; 21	VIR; 4	VIR; 5	NJE; 3	NJE; 3	7th	290
2010	SuperBike	Ducati	DAY; 4	DAY; 4	FON; 3	FON; DNS	RAT	RAT	INF	INF	RAM	RAM	MOH	MOH	LAG	VIR; DNS	VIR; DNS	NJE; DNS	NJE; DNS	BAR	BAR			18th	59

=== AMA Supersport Championship ===
==== By year ====
Year	Class	Bike	1	2	3	4	5	6	7	8	9	10	11	Pos	Pts
2004	Supersport	Suzuki	DAY; 7	FON	INF; 7	BAR; 6	PPK; 8	RAM; 9	BRD; 8	LAG	M-O	RAT	VIR	15th	141

=== AMA Superstock Championship ===
Year	Class	Bike	1	2	3	4	5	6	7	8	9	10	11	Pos	Pts
2005	Superstock	Suzuki	DAY; 2	BAR; 3	FON; 10	INF; 1	PPK; 2	RAM; 1	LAG; 1	M-O; 1	VIR; 1	RAT; 9		1st	323
2006	Superstock	Suzuki	DAY; 3	BAR; 1	FON; 3	INF; 2	RAM; 1	MIL; 2	LAG; 2	OHI; 3	VIR; 4	RAT; 7	OHI; 2	2nd	363
2007	Superstock	Suzuki	DAY; 4	BAR; 1	FON; 3	INF; 7	RAM; 8	MIL; 3	LAG	OHI	VIR; 2	RAT; 14	LAG; 2	3rd	251

=== Grand Prix motorcycle racing ===
==== By season ====
Season	Class	Motorcycle	Team	Race	Win	Podium	Pole	FLap	Pts	Plcd
2012	MotoGP	BCL	GPTech	1	0	0	0	0	0	NC
Total				1	0	0	0	0	0	

==== Races by year ====
(key)

Year	Class	Bike	1	2	3	4	5	6	7	8	9	10	11	12	13	14	15	16	17	18	Pos.	Pts
2012	MotoGP	BCL	QAT	SPA	POR	FRA	CAT	GBR	NED	GER	ITA	USA	INP; 16	CZE	RSM	ARA	JPN	MAL	AUS	VAL	NC	0
