= 2010 AMA Pro Daytona Sportbike Championship =

American motorcycle racing series

2010 AMA Daytona Sportbike Championship

Seasons
- ← 2009 2011 →

The 2010 AMA Pro Daytona Sportbike Championship was the second running of the AMA Daytona Sportbike Championship, an American motorcycle racing series that acts as a feeder series for the AMA Pro American Superbike Championship. Title sponsors for the series include Sunoco, Amsoil, National Guard, Dunlop, Speedcom and SunTrust.

Martín Cárdenas won his first championship riding a Suzuki.

== Calendar ==
| No | | Round/Circuit | Date | Pole position | Fastest lap | Winner |
|---|---|---|---|---|---|---|
| 1 | R1 | (Florida) Daytona | March 3–5 | (Oklahoma) Danny Eslick | (California) Steve Rapp | (California) Josh Herrin |
| 2 | R1 | (California) Fontana | March 26–28 | (Oklahoma) Danny Eslick | (Colombia) Martín Cárdenas | (Colombia) Martín Cárdenas |
| 2 | R2 | (California) Fontana | March 26–28 | (Oklahoma) Danny Eslick | (California) Josh Herrin | (California) Josh Herrin |
| 3 | R1 | (Georgia (U.S. state)) Road Atlanta | April 16–18 | (California) Tommy Aquino | (Oklahoma) Dane Westby | (Colombia) Martín Cárdenas |
| 3 | R2 | (Georgia (U.S. state)) Road Atlanta | April 16–18 | (California) Tommy Aquino | (California) Josh Herrin | (Colombia) Martín Cárdenas |
| 4 | R1 | (California) Infineon | May 14–16 | (California) Tommy Aquino | (Oklahoma) Danny Eslick | (Colombia) Martín Cárdenas |
| 4 | R2 | (California) Infineon | May 14–16 | (California) Tommy Aquino | (California) Steve Rapp | (Oklahoma) Danny Eslick |
| 5 | R1 | (Wisconsin) Road America | June 4–6 | (California) Josh Herrin | (Oklahoma) Dane Westby | (California) Josh Herrin |
| 5 | R2 | (Wisconsin) Road America | June 4–6 | (California) Josh Herrin | (Colombia) Martín Cárdenas | (Colombia) Martín Cárdenas |
| 6 | R1 | Mid-Ohio | July 16–18 | (California) Josh Herrin | (California) Josh Herrin | (California) Josh Herrin |
| 6 | R2 | Mid-Ohio | July 16–18 | (California) Josh Herrin | (California) Bobby Fong | (Oklahoma) Danny Eslick |
| 7 | R1 | (California) Laguna Seca | July 23–25 | (California) Tommy Aquino | (California) Bobby Fong | (Colombia) Martín Cárdenas |
| 8 | R1 | (Virginia) VIR | August 13–15 | (Oklahoma) Danny Eslick | (Oklahoma) Danny Eslick | (California) Bobby Fong |
| 8 | R2 | (Virginia) VIR | August 13–15 | (Oklahoma) Danny Eslick | (Colombia) Martín Cárdenas | (California) Josh Herrin |
| 9 | R1 | New Jersey | September 3–5 | (Oklahoma) Danny Eslick | (California) Josh Herrin | (Colombia) Martín Cárdenas |
| 9 | R2 | New Jersey | September 3–5 | (Oklahoma) Danny Eslick | (Colombia) Martín Cárdenas | (Oklahoma) Danny Eslick |
| 10 | R1 | (Alabama) Barber | September 24–26 | (California) Josh Herrin | (South Africa) Clinton Seller | (Colombia) Martín Cárdenas |
| 10 | R2 | (Alabama) Barber | September 24–26 | (California) Josh Herrin | (Colombia) Martín Cárdenas | (Colombia) Martín Cárdenas |

== Season standings ==
=== Riders' standings ===
| Pos | Rider | Bike | DAY (Florida) | FON (California) | | RAT (Georgia (U.S. state)) | | INF (California) | | RAM (Wisconsin) | | M-O (Ohio) | | LAG (California) | VIR (Virginia) | | N-J (New Jersey) | | BAR (Alabama) | | Pts |
| Pos | Rider | Bike | R1 | R1 | R2 | R1 | R2 | R1 | R2 | R1 | R2 | R1 | R2 | R1 | R1 | R2 | R1 | R2 | R1 | R2 | Pts |
|---|---|---|---|---|---|---|---|---|---|---|---|---|---|---|---|---|---|---|---|---|---|
| 1 | (Colombia) Cárdenas | Suzuki | DNF | 1 | 10 | 1 | 1 | 1 | DNF | 3 | 1 | 3 | 5 | 1 | 2 | 5 | 1 | 3 | 1 | 1 | 405 |
| 2 | (Oklahoma) Eslick | Suzuki | 4 | 2 | 2 | 3 | 4 | 2 | 1 | 5 | 7 | 4 | 1 | 5 | 3 | 3 | 5 | 1 | 5 | 2 | 397 |
| 3 | (California) Herrin | Yamaha | 1 | 4 | 1 | 8 | 2 | 5 | 2 | 1 | 2 | 1 | 19 | 6 | DNF | 1 | 2 | 2 | 3 | 11 | 377 |
| 4 | (California) Rapp | Ducati | 3 | 7 | 3 | 6 | 6 | 8 | 16 | 2 | 3 | 6 | 2 | 2 | 5 | 2 | 10 | DNF | DNF | 7 | 281 |
| 5 | (Oklahoma) Westby | Yamaha | 2 | 3 | 4 | 4 | 13 | 4 | 3 | 9 | 5 | 23 | DNF | DNF | 10 | 17 | 3 | 6 | 4 | 3 | 248 |
| 6 | (Arkansas) West | Suzuki | 6 | 5 | 7 | 2 | 3 | 9 | 5 | DNF | 4 | 8 | 7 | 7 | DNF | 7 | 6 | DNF | DNF | 6 | 224 |
| 7 | (California) Aquino | Yamaha | DNF | 6 | 6 | 5 | 5 | 3 | 4 | DNF | DNF | 5 | 4 | 4 | 4 | 9 | 22 | 5 | DNF | 8 | 215 |
| 8 | (California) Fong | Ducati | 13 | 9 | 5 | DNF | 10 | DNF | 6 | 18 | 10 | 2 | 3 | DNF | 1 | DNF | 4 | 7 | | | 185 |
| 9 | (South Africa) Seller | Yamaha | DNF | 10 | 9 | 7 | 7 | 7 | DNF | 4 | 8 | 9 | 16 | 3 | DNF | DNF | | | 2 | 9 | 170 |
| 10 | (Michigan) Fillmore | Suzuki | | 8 | 8 | 9 | 8 | 6 | 7 | DNF | 9 | 7 | 12 | 8 | 15 | DNF | 8 | DNF | DNF | 5 | 167 |
| 11 | (New York (state)) Jacobsen | Suzuki | DNF | | | DNF | 12 | 10 | 8 | 6 | 6 | 11 | 6 | DNF | DNF | 4 | 7 | 4 | 7 | DNF | 152 |
| 12 | (Venezuela) Amantini | Kawasaki | DNF | 14 | 13 | 14 | 17 | 17 | 12 | 7 | 11 | 19 | 9 | 10 | 9 | 10 | 14 | 13 | 11 | 15 | 142 |
| 13 | (California) Beck | Ducati | | | | | | 11 | DNF | 11 | 13 | 13 | DNF | 9 | 6 | 6 | 11 | 9 | 9 | DNF | 112 |
| 14 | (Alabama) Wikle | Suzuki | DNF | | | 11 | 15 | 12 | DNF | | | 17 | 13 | 13 | | | 13 | 10 | 10 | 12 | 84 |
| 15 | (Tennessee) Turner | Suzuki | DNF | | | 13 | 16 | | | 8 | DNF | 16 | 10 | | 12 | 13 | | | 8 | 13 | 80 |
| 16 | (Pennsylvania) Allison | Yamaha | | | | | | | | 14 | DNF | 15 | DNF | | DNF | 8 | 9 | 8 | DNF | 4 | 69 |
| 17 | (New York (state)) Wyman | Yamaha | | | | 17 | 18 | | | | | 20 | 15 | | 8 | DNF | DNS | 11 | 6 | 10 | 63 |
| 18 | (Colombia) Villa | Suzuki | 15 | DNS | DNS | | | DNS | DNS | 15 | 17 | 22 | 23 | 15 | 11 | 11 | 15 | 14 | | | 55 |
| 19 | (California) Hale | Yamaha | | 13 | 14 | 15 | 14 | 13 | DNF | 12 | 12 | | | DNS | | | | | | | 54 |
| 20 | (California) Odom | Honda | | 12 | 12 | | | 14 | 10 | | | | | 11 | | | | | | | 46 |
| 21 | (Wisconsin) Higbee | Buell | 8 | | | | | | | | | | | 12 | | | | | | | 42 |
| 21 | (Wisconsin) Higbee | Yamaha | | 11 | 11 | | | | | | | | | | | | | | | | 42 |
| 22 | (Indiana) Morgan | Suzuki | | | | 21 | 26 | | | 16 | 16 | 21 | 18 | | 14 | 15 | 21 | DNF | 16 | 18 | 36 |
| 23 | (Georgia (U.S. state)) May | Suzuki | 7 | | | 10 | 11 | | | | | | | | | | | | | | 35 |
| 24 | (Florida) Barnes | Yamaha | DNF | | | | | | | | | 12 | 14 | | 7 | 19 | | | | | 32 |
| 25 | (Florida) Wacker | Suzuki | DNF | | | 24 | 29 | | | 21 | DNS | | | | 17 | 14 | 18 | 15 | 13 | DNF | 28 |
| 26 | (Canada) Christie | Honda | | | | | | | | | | | | | 13 | 12 | | | 14 | 20 | 25 |
| 27 | (Indiana) D. Jones | Yamaha | | | | 12 | 19 | | | 17 | 15 | DNF | 17 | | | | | | | | 25 |
| 28 | (Florida) Day | Yamaha | DNF | | | | | | | | | 10 | 8 | | DNF | DNF | | | | | 24 |
| 29 | (California) Paris | Yamaha | DNF | | | 25 | 28 | 20 | 15 | 19 | 18 | DNF | 21 | 28 | 16 | 16 | 20 | DNF | | | 23 |
| 30 | (Florida) Long | Kawasaki | DNF | | | 16 | 20 | | | | | | | | | | | | 12 | 14 | 22 |
| 18 | (Scotland) Coghlan | Yamaha | 5 | | | | | | | | | | | | | | | | | | 16 |
| 19 | (Florida) Crozier | Ducati | DNF | 15 | 15 | 18 | 22 | | | | | | | | | | | | | | 15 |
| 20 | (California) Ferreira | Suzuki | | 16 | 17 | | | 16 | DNF | | | | | | | | | | | | 14 |
| 22 | Bonsey | Yamaha | | | | | | 18 | 11 | | | | | | | | | | | | 13 |
| 23 | (Washington (state)) Holden | Ducati | | | | DNF | 9 | | | | | | | | | | | | | | 12 |
| 24 | (Washington (state)) Edwards | Yamaha | | | | | | DNF | 9 | | | | | | | | | | | | 12 |
| 25 | (Michigan) Knapp | Ducati | 9 | | | | | | | | | | | | | | | | | | 12 |
| 27 | (Massachusetts) E. Wood | Honda | 10 | | | | | | | | | | | | | | | | | | 11 |
| 29 | (South Dakota) Haugo | Yamaha | 11 | | | | | | | | | | | | | | | | | | 10 |
| 30 | (California) Santacoloma | Honda | | | | | | 15 | 18 | | | | | | | | | | | | 9 |
| 31 | (Maryland) Patterson | Yamaha | 12 | | | | | | | | | | | | | | | | | | 9 |
| 32 | (New York (state)) Ruess | Kawasaki | | 17 | 18 | | | 26 | 20 | | | | | | | | | | | | 8 |
| 33 | Pinkstaff | Kawasaki | | | | | | 22 | 13 | | | | | | | | | | | | 8 |
| 36 | Mason | Yamaha | | | | | | 21 | 14 | | | | | | | | | | | | 7 |
| 37 | (Colorado) Orlando | Kawasaki | 14 | | | | | | | | | | | | | | | | | | 7 |
| 40 | (California) Summers | Suzuki | | | | | | 19 | 17 | | | | | | | | | | | | 6 |
| 41 | (California) McFarland | Buell | | 21 | 16 | | | | | | | | | | | | | | | | 5 |
| 42 | (Canada) James | Buell | 24 | | | | | | | 24 | DNS | | | | | | | | | | 0 |
| 43 | (California) Riad | Yamaha | | 19 | 19 | | | | | | | | | | | | | | | | 4 |
| 44 | (Italy) Padovani | Ducati | 17 | | | | | | | | | | | | | | | | | | 4 |
| 45 | (California) Heard | Kawasaki | | 18 | DNF | | | DNF | DNS | | | | | | | | | | | | 3 |
| 46 | (Georgia (U.S. state)) Lazo | Yamaha | 18 | | | 23 | 24 | | | | | | | | | | | | | | 3 |
| 47 | (California) Simmons | Yamaha | | 20 | 20 | | | | | | | | | | | | | | | | 2 |
| 48 | (Florida) Londono | Suzuki | | | | 19 | 21 | | | | | | | | | | | | | | 2 |
| 49 | Covarrubias | Kawasaki | | | | | | 24 | 19 | | | | | | | | | | | | 2 |
| 50 | (Italy) Marchetti | Ducati | 19 | | | | | | | | | | | | | | | | | | 2 |
| 51 | (Georgia (U.S. state)) White | Kawasaki | | | | 20 | 23 | | | | | | | | | | | | | | 1 |
| 52 | (Missouri) Sipp | Buell | 20 | | | | | | | | | | | | | | | | | | 1 |
| | (Florida) Ashmead | Kawasaki | 21 | | | | | | | | | | | | | | | | | | 0 |
| | (Peru) Vargas | Kawasaki | 22 | | | | | | | | | | | | | | | | | | 0 |
| | (Florida) Keesee | Kawasaki | 23 | | | | | | | | | | | | | | | | | | 0 |
| | (Wisconsin) Martinez | Yamaha | 24 | | | | | | | 23 | 20 | | | | | | | | | | 1 |
| | (France) Dumain | Yamaha | 25 | | | | | | | | | | | | | | | | | | 0 |
| | (Canada) McCormick | Suzuki | DNF | | | | | | | | | | | | | | | | | | 0 |
| | (Florida) McPherson | Yamaha | DNF | | | | | | | | | | | | | | | | | | 0 |
| | (Massachusetts) Je. Wood | Suzuki | DNF | | | | | | | | | | | | | | | | | | 0 |
| | (Virginia) Moodie | Yamaha | DNF | | | | | | | | | | | | | | | | | | 0 |
| | (New Jersey) Fania Jr | Suzuki | DNF | | | | | | | | | | | | | | | | | | 0 |
| | (Slovenia) Skubic | Yamaha | DNF | | | | | | | | | | | | | | | | | | 0 |
| | (California) Presting | Yamaha | | DNF | DNS | | | 23 | DNF | | | | | | | | | | | | 0 |
| | (California) Gibbs | Yamaha | | DNF | DNS | | | | | | | | | | | | | | | | 0 |
| | (Utah) Gibson | Kawasaki | | DNS | DNS | | | | | | | | | | | | | | | | 0 |
| | Stacey | Suzuki | | | | 22 | 25 | | | | | | | | | | | | | | 0 |
| | Humphreys | Suzuki | | | | 26 | 30 | | | | | | | | | | | | | | 0 |
| | (Canada) Boucher | Honda | | | | 27 | 27 | | | 20 | 19 | | | | | | | | | | 3 |
| | Clay | Honda | | | | DNF | DNS | | | | | | | | | | | | | | 0 |
| | Rich | Yamaha | | | | | | 25 | 21 | | | | | | | | | | | | 0 |
| | (Canada) Boisvert | Suzuki | | | | | | 27 | DNF | | | | | | | | | | | | 0 |
| | Yates | Suzuki | | | | | | DNS | DNS | | | | | | | | | | | | 0 |
| | T. Jones | Yamaha | | | | | | DNS | DNS | | | | | | | | | | | | 0 |
| | Crow | Ducati | | | | | | DNS | DNS | | | | | | | | | | | | 0 |
| | Ji. Wood | Kawasaki | | | | | | | | 10 | 22 | | | | | | | | | | 11 |
| | Reichert | Yamaha | | | | | | | | 13 | 14 | | | | | | | | | | 15 |
| | Rozynski | Yamaha | | | | | | | | 22 | 21 | | | | | | | | | | 0 |
| | Hill | Suzuki | | | | | | | | 25 | 23 | | | | | | | | | | 0 |
| Pos | Rider | Bike | DAY (Florida) | FON (California) | | RAT (Georgia (U.S. state)) | | INF (California) | | RAM (Wisconsin) | | M-O (Ohio) | | LAG (California) | VIR (Virginia) | | N-J (New Jersey) | | BAR (Alabama) | | Pts |

=== Manufacture standings ===
| Pos | Manufacture | DAY (Florida) | FON (California) | | RAT (Georgia (U.S. state)) | | INF (California) | | RAM (Wisconsin) | | M-O (Ohio) | | LAG (California) | VIR (Virginia) | | N-J (New Jersey) | | BAR (Alabama) | | Pts |
| Pos | Manufacture | R1 | R1 | R2 | R1 | R2 | R1 | R2 | R1 | R2 | R1 | R2 | R1 | R1 | R2 | R1 | R2 | R1 | R2 | Pts |
|---|---|---|---|---|---|---|---|---|---|---|---|---|---|---|---|---|---|---|---|---|
| 1 | (Japan) Suzuki | 4 | 1 | 2 | 1 | 1 | | | | | | | | | | | | | | 133 |
| 2 | (Japan) Yamaha | 1 | 3 | 1 | 4 | 2 | | | | | | | | | | | | | | 124 |
| 3 | (Italy) Ducati | 3 | 7 | 3 | 6 | 6 | | | | | | | | | | | | | | 86 |
| 4 | (Japan) Kawasaki | 14 | 14 | 13 | 14 | 17 | | | | | | | | | | | | | | 33 |
| 5 | (Japan) Honda | 10 | 12 | 12 | 27 | 27 | | | | | | | | | | | | | | 29 |
| 6 | (United States) Buell | 8 | 21 | 16 | | | | | | | | | | | | | | | | 18 |
| Pos | Manufacture | DAY (Florida) | FON (California) | | RAT (Georgia (U.S. state)) | | INF (California) | | RAM (Wisconsin) | | M-O (Ohio) | | LAG (California) | VIR (Virginia) | | N-J (New Jersey) | | BAR (Alabama) | | Pts |

== Entry list ==
2010 Entry List (74)
| Team | Bike | No | Riders | Rounds |
|---|---|---|---|---|
| Richie Morris Racing Suzuki | Suzuki GSX-R600 | 1 | (Oklahoma) Danny Eslick | 1–4 |
| Team Project 1 Atlanta | Yamaha YZF-R6 | 2 | (Oklahoma) Dane Westby | 1–4 |
| Team Project 1 Atlanta | Yamaha YZF-R6 | 4 | (South Africa) Clinton Seller | 1–4 |
| Team Graves Yamaha | Yamaha YZF-R6 | 6 | (California) Tommy Aquino | 1–4 |
| Team Graves Yamaha | Yamaha YZF-R6 | 8 | (California) Josh Herrin | 1–4 |
| Team Amantini | Kawasaki ZX-6R | 7 | (Venezuela) Fernando Amantini | 1–4 |
| Higbee-Racing | Buell 1125R; Yamaha YZF-R6 | 11 | (Wisconsin) Shawn Higbee | 1–2 |
| Ricky Orlando Racing | Kawasaki ZX-6R | 12 | (Colorado) Ricky Orlando | 1 |
| MPH Racing, Inc. | Yamaha YZF-R6 | 13 | (California) Melissa Paris | 1, 3–4 |
| DNA Energy Drink/CNR Motorsports Ducati | Ducati 848 | 14 | (Florida) Mark Crozier | 1–3 |
| DNA Energy Drink/CNR Motorsports Ducati | Ducati 848 | 30 | (California) Bobby Fong | 1–4 |
| DNA Energy Drink/CNR Motorsports Ducati | Ducati 848 | 60 | (California) Michael Beck | 4 |
| Team Latus Motors Racing | Ducati 848 | 15 | (California) Steve Rapp | 1–4 |
| Wikle Racing | Suzuki GSX-R600 | 16 | (Alabama) Russ Wikle | 1, 3–4 |
| Viking Moto | Yamaha YZF-R6 | 19 | (South Dakota) Eric Haugo | 1 |
| Mid Cities Motorsports | Ducati 848 | 20 | (Wisconsin) Calvin Martinez | 1 |
| Ducshop Racing | Ducati 848 | 23 | (Washington (state)) Jake Holden | 3 |
| Ducshop Racing | Ducati 848 | 23 | (Michigan) Taylor Knapp | 1 |
| Ducshop Racing | Ducati 848 | 77 | (Italy) Dario Marchetti | 1 |
| Aussie Dave Racing | Yamaha YZF-R6 | 25 | (Scotland) Kev Coghlan | 1 |
| Aztrackday.com | Yamaha YZF-R6 | 26 | (Arizona) Ted Rich | 4 |
| Four Feathers Racing | Yamaha YZF-R6 | 47 | (Florida) Josh Day | 1 |
| Longevity Racing | Ducati 848 | 29 | (Florida) Barrett Long | 1, 3 |
| RoadRacingWorld.com | Suzuki GSX-R600 | 32 | (Colombia) Santiago Villa | 1–2, 4 |
| VRC Racing | Yamaha YZF-R6 | 34 | (Florida) Michael Barnes | 1 |
| M4 Monster Suzuki | Suzuki GSX-R600 | 36 | (Colombia) Martín Cárdenas | 1–4 |
| Brady Racing | Kawasaki ZX-6R | 37 | (Florida) John Ashmead | 1 |
| Turner's Cycle Racing | Suzuki GSX-R600 | 38 | (Tennessee) Kris Turner | 1, 3 |
| Erion Racing | Honda CBR600RR | 46 | (California) Tyler Odom | 2, 4 |
| Alex Lazo Racing | Yamaha YZF-R6 | 49 | (Georgia (U.S. state)) Alex Lazo | 1, 3 |
| Team Heyser/Woodcraft | Honda CBR600RR | 53 | (Massachusetts) Eric Wood | 1 |
| Celtic Racing | Suzuki GSX-R600 | 54 | (New York (state)) P. J. Jacobsen | 1, 3–4 |
| Celebrity Xtreme | Yamaha YZF-R6 | 59 | (California) JC Gibbs | 2 |
| Vesrah Suzuki | Suzuki GSX-R600 | 57 | (Arkansas) Cory West | 1–4 |
| Vesrah Suzuki | Suzuki GSX-R600 | 75 | (Michigan) Chris Fillmore | 2–4 |
| Vesrah Suzuki | Suzuki GSX-R600 | 75 | (Massachusetts) Jeff Wood | 1 |
| Picotte Racing | Suzuki GSX-R600 | 61 | (Canada) Brett McCormick | 1 |
| Sport Bike Night Racing | Suzuki GSX-R600 | 62 | (California) Shaun Summers | 4 |
| CR2 Corse | Ducati 848 | 65 | (Italy) Andrea Padovani | 1 |
| Bayside Performance | Suzuki GSX-R600 | 68 | (Canada) Kevin Boisvert | 4 |
| Brevard Superbike Racing | Kawasaki ZX-6R | 69 | (Florida) Kyle Keesee | 1 |
| James Gang/Hoban Bros. Racing | Buell 1125R | 70 | (Canada) Paul James | 1 |
| Mantega Racing | Suzuki GSX-R600 | 73 | (California) Sebastiao Ferreira | 2, 4 |
| Wacker Racing LLC | Suzuki GSX-R600 | 78 | (Florida) Reese Wacker | 1, 3 |
| Ace Racing | Yamaha YZF-R6 | 80 | (California) Stevie Bonsey | 4 |
| Humphryes Racing | Suzuki GSX-R600 | 81 | (Florida) Wes Humphryes | 3 |
| Eli Edwards Racing | Yamaha YZF-R6 | 82 | (Washington (state)) Eli Edwards | 4 |
| Boucher Racing | Honda CBR600RR | 83 | (Canada) Marie-Josee Boucher | 3 |
| KSW Racing | Suzuki GSX-R600 | 84 | (New Jersey) Anthony Fania Jr. | 1 |
| Swigz.com Pro Racing | Suzuki GSX-R600 | 89 | (California) Chip Yates | 4 |
| Clutch Racing | Yamaha YZF-R6 | 95 | Ryan Clay | 3 |
| GMR Racing | Suzuki GSX-R600 | 99 | (Georgia (U.S. state)) Geoff May | 1, 3 |
| Bulldog Racing | Yamaha YZF-R6 | 113 | (Virginia) Craig Moodie | 1 |
| Zlock Racing | Kawasaki ZX-6R | 121 | (California) Brian Pinkstaff | 4 |
| Team AMS Racing | Yamaha YZF-R6 | 122 | (California) Matthew Presting | 2, 4 |
| D&R Racing | Suzuki GSX-R600 | 125 | (Maryland) Ryan Patterson | 1 |
| Hale Racing | Yamaha YZF-R6 | 139 | (California) Lenny Hale | 2–4 |
| Cha Cha Cha Motorsports/Zorba's | Kawasaki ZX-6R | 153 | (California) Terry Heard | 2 |
| Moto Journal-Crit | Yamaha YZF-R6 | 170 | (France) David Dumain | 1 |
| Calguns.net/Gunpal.com/Fast50s.com | Yamaha YZF-R6 | 181 | (California) Craig Mason | 4 |
| Vargas Racing | Kawasaki ZX-6R | 192 | (Peru) Roberto Vargas | 1 |
| Impact Racing | Yamaha YZF-R6 | 195 | (California) Jeremy Simmons | 2 |
| Chase McFarland Racing | Buell 1125R | 197 | (California) Chase McFarland | 2 |
| Walt Sipp Racing | Buell 1125R | 221 | (Missouri) Walt Sipp | 1 |
| Nadr Riad | Yamaha YZF-R6 | 250 | (California) Nadr Riad | 2 |
| Tim Jones Racing | Yamaha YZF-R6 | 313 | (California) Timothy Jones | 4 |
| Rockwell Time | Kawasaki ZX-6R | 370 | (Utah) Clinton Gibson | 2 |
| Get Some Racing | Kawasaki ZX-6R | 444 | (Utah) Oscar Covarrubias | 4 |
| Southern Motorsports | Suzuki GSX-R600 | 461 | (United States) Abe Stacey | 3 |
| Inotherm Yamaha Racing Team Slovenia | Yamaha YZF-R6 | 474 | (Slovenia) Bostjan Skubic | 1 |
| McNology Racing | Yamaha YZF-R6 | 594 | (Florida) David McPherson | 1 |
| Racezen | Honda CBR600RR | 714 | (Florida) Gabriel Santacoloma | 4 |
| Ruess Racing | Kawasaki ZX-6R | 808 | (California) Jay J. Ruess | 2 |
| Autolite RIM Racing | Suzuki GSX-R600 | 811 | (Indiana) Michael Morgan | 3 |

Key
Regular Rider
Wildcard Rider
Replacement Rider

== See also ==
- 2010 AMA Pro American Superbike Championship
- 2010 AMA Pro Supersport Championship
