= 2011 AMA Pro Daytona Sportbike Championship =

American motorcycle racing series

Seasons
- ← 2010 2012 →

The 2011 AMA Pro Daytona Sportbike Championship was the third running of the AMA Daytona Sportbike Championship. The series covered 8 rounds beginning at Daytona International Speedway with the Daytona 200 on March 12, and concluding at New Jersey Motorsports Park on September 4. The champion was Danny Eslick riding a Suzuki.

== Calendar ==
The calendar was announced with seven rounds on December 8, 2010. A round at Barber Motorsports Park was added to the schedule on February 16, 2011.

No		Round/Circuit	Date	Pole position	Fastest lap	Winner
1	R1	(Florida) Daytona	March 10–12	(California) Jake Zemke	(New York (state)) Jason DiSalvo	(New York (state)) Jason DiSalvo
2	R1	(California) Infineon	May 13–15	(New York (state)) Jason DiSalvo	(New York (state)) Jason DiSalvo	(New York (state)) Jason DiSalvo
2	R2	(California) Infineon	May 13–15	(New York (state)) Jason DiSalvo	(New York (state)) Jason DiSalvo	(New York (state)) Jason DiSalvo
3	R1	(Virginia) Miller †	May 28–30	(New York (state)) Jason DiSalvo	(California) Josh Herrin	(California) Josh Herrin
4	R1	(Wisconsin) Road America	June 3–5	(New York (state)) Jason DiSalvo	(California) Josh Herrin	(California) Josh Herrin
4	R2	(Wisconsin) Road America	June 3–5	(New York (state)) Jason DiSalvo	(Oklahoma) Danny Eslick	(California) Josh Herrin
5	R1	(Alabama) Barber	June 17–19	(Oklahoma) Danny Eslick	(New York (state)) Jason DiSalvo	(Oklahoma) Danny Eslick
5	R2	(Alabama) Barber	June 17–19	(Oklahoma) Danny Eslick	(California) Cameron Beaubier	(California) Josh Herrin
6	R1	Mid-Ohio	July 8–10	(California) Josh Herrin	(California) Cameron Beaubier	(Oklahoma) Dane Westby
6	R2	Mid-Ohio	July 8–10	(California) Josh Herrin	(California) Cameron Beaubier	(Oklahoma) Danny Eslick
7	R1	(California) Laguna Seca ‡	July 22–24	(New York (state)) Jason DiSalvo	(California) Cameron Beaubier	(Oklahoma) Danny Eslick
8	R1	New Jersey	September 2–4	(California) Tommy Aquino	(Wisconsin) Bryce Prince	(California) Tommy Aquino
8	R2	New Jersey	September 2–4	(California) Tommy Aquino	(Oklahoma) Dane Westby	(California) Josh Herrin

† = World Superbike Weekend
‡ = MotoGP weekend

== Championship standings ==
=== Riders' Championship ===
Pos	Rider	Bike	DAY	INF		MIL	RAM		BAR		MOH		LGS	NJR		Points
1	(United States) Danny Eslick	Suzuki	Ret	3	2	7	4	2*	**1**	**2**	3	1	1	6	5	275
2	(United States) Josh Herrin	Yamaha	5	DNS	3	1*	1*	1	Ret	1	**2**	**5**	29	2	1	256
3	(United States) Tommy Aquino	Yamaha	6	5	7	10	5	4	4	4	5	2	4	**1**	**3**	237
4	(United States) Jason DiSalvo	Ducati	1*	**1***	**1***	**6**	**Ret**	**Ret**	5*	6	4	7	**3**			224
4	(United States) Jason DiSalvo	Triumph												7	7	224
5	(United States) Cory West	Suzuki	2	6	5	4	2	5	3	20	7	6	5	4	6	215
6	(United States) Cameron Beaubier	Yamaha	8	7	6	3	7	6	Ret	3*	6*	3*	2*	3	4	213
7	(United States) Dane Westby	Suzuki	13	Ret	8	5	8	3	2	Ret	1	4	6	17	2*	188
8	(United States) Taylor Knapp	Suzuki	14	11	9	14	6	Ret	6	5	8	9	8	5	18	139
9	(United States) Tyler O'Hara	Yamaha	17	10	13	18	12	10	8	8	10	10	13	9	13	122
10	(United States) P. J. Jacobsen	Ducati	Ret	4	4	2	3	22	16	Ret	21	16	30	8	17	112
11	(United States) Huntley Nash	Yamaha	12	15	16	15	13	12	9	Ret	12	13	12	13	10	100
12	(Venezuela) Fernando Amantini	Kawasaki	7	13	11	23	10	7	20	Ret	13	15	9	27	14	91
13	(United States) Paul Allison	Yamaha	10	8	10	9	Ret	9	Ret	Ret	14	8	Ret	26	20	80
14	(Colombia) Santiago Villa	Suzuki	9	22	14	13	11	11	21	11	15	Ret		10	21	74
15	(United States) Josh Galster	Yamaha		14	15	8					11	19	16	15	11	59
16	(United States) Tyler Odom	Honda		9	24	Ret	Ret	8	12	10			10	DNS	DNS	56
17	(United States) Kris Turner	Suzuki	11						7	7	23	Ret				38
18	(United States) Bryce Prince	Yamaha		12	12	24							15	24*	8	37
19	(United States) David Sadowski, Jr.	Ducati	19	18	17	22	Ret	13	13	12			21			34
20	(United States) Michael Morgan	Suzuki				DNS	19	15	15	15	16	Ret		20	15	32
21	(United States) Matthew Sadowski	Ducati	Ret	16	18	19	14	16	22	13			20			31
22	(United States) Barrett Long	Ducati	Ret				17	17	11	9						30
23	(United States) Jake Holden	Ducati	31	2	Ret	20	Ret	Ret			Ret	Ret	Ret			26
24	(United States) Melissa Paris	Yamaha	18	19	21	16	Ret	19	18	Ret	19	17	19	21	19	25
25	(United States) Jake Zemke	Yamaha	**3**													23
26	(United Kingdom) Kev Coghlan	Yamaha											7	12	Ret	23
27	(United States) Kyle Wyman	Yamaha									9	11		25	Ret	22
28	(United States) Austin Dehaven	Yamaha											11	11	Ret	20
29	(United States) J. D. Beach	Kawasaki	4													18
30	(United States) Matt Hall	Yamaha					15	14	Ret	16						18
31	(United States) Jason Farrell	Kawasaki	16				9	Ret								17
32	(United States) Mike Selpe	Kawasaki												16	9	17
33	(United States) Dalton Dimick	Yamaha				11							14			17
34	(United States) Joey Pascarella	Yamaha	15			12										15
35	(United States) Ricky Corey	Yamaha							10	Ret						11
36	(Mexico) Nahun Álvarez	Honda				21			14	Ret			17	Ret	DNS	11
37	(Canada) Kenny Riedmann	Triumph					DNQ	DNQ	23	17	DNS	DNS		14	Ret	11
38	(United States) Christian Cronin	Yamaha				25					17	14				11
39	(United States) Wes Humphryes	Suzuki	DNQ						17	14						11
40	(United States) Raul Alzate	Yamaha									20	Ret	27	23	12	10
41	(United States) Sam Rozynski	Yamaha	25	DNQ	DNQ	28			19	19	18	18		22	DNS	10
42	(Canada) Emerson Connor	Ducati									22	12				9
43	(United States) Brian Hall	Kawasaki					16	18								8
44	(New Zealand) Dominic Jones	Suzuki												18	16	8
45	(United States) Craig Mason	Yamaha		17	19								28			6
46	(United States) Eli Edwards	Yamaha				17										4
47	(United States) Dave Ebben	Kawasaki					18	20								4
48	(Mexico) Dirk Sánchez	Ducati							Ret	18			22			3
49	(United States) Shaun Summers	Yamaha											18			3
50	(United States) Skip Salenius	Yamaha											24	19	22	2
51	(United States) Oscar Covarrubias	Kawasaki		20	20								DNS			2
52	(United States) Shawn Hill	Kawasaki	DNQ				20	21								1
53	(United States) Ricky Orlando	Kawasaki	20			27										1
54	(Canada) Kevin Boisvert	Suzuki		21	22											0
55	(United States) Calvin Martinez	Kawasaki					21	DNS								0
56	(United States) Reese Wacker	Suzuki	21													0
57	(United States) Pat Mooney	Buell	22													0
58	(United States) Patrick McCord	Kawasaki		Ret	23	32										0
59	(Slovenia) Boštjan Skubic	Yamaha	DSQ										23			0
60	(United States) Anthony Fania	Suzuki	23													0
61	(Brazil) Luiz Cerciari	Suzuki	24													0
62	(United States) Ted Rich	Yamaha				26							25			0
63	(United States) David McPherson	Yamaha	26													0
64	(United States) Brian Pinkstaff	Kawasaki											26			0
65	(United States) Lyles Sanders	Yamaha	27													0
66	(United States) Giuseppe Messina	Yamaha	28													0
67	(Canada) Scott Decker	Suzuki	29													0
68	(United States) Mike T. Shreve	Yamaha				29										0
69	(United States) Ray Hofman	Honda	30				DNQ	DNQ								0
70	(United States) Kelcey Walker	Yamaha				30										0
71	(United States) Dylon Husband	Kawasaki				31										0
	(United States) Russ Wikle	Suzuki	Ret													0
	(United States) Les Moscariello	Ducati	Ret													0
	(United States) Eric Bostrom	Kawasaki	Ret													0
	(United States) Lenny Hale	Ducati											Ret			0
	(United States) John Ashmead	Kawasaki	DNQ													0
	(United States) Marco Martinez	Kawasaki	DNQ													0
	(United States) Thomas Digiandomenico	Yamaha	DNQ													0
	(United States) Mark McCormick	Yamaha	DNQ													0
	(United States) Michael Barnes	Yamaha	DNQ													0
	(United Kingdom) David Jones	Triumph	DNQ													0
	(United States) Jeremy Simmons	Yamaha				DNQ										0
Pos	Rider	Bike	DAY	INF		MIL	RAM		BAR		MOH		LGS	NJR		Points

Colour	Result
Gold	Winner (1)
Silver	2nd place (2)
Bronze	3rd place (3)
Green	Finished, in points (4-20)
Blue	Finished, no points (21+)
Purple	Did not finish (Ret)
Purple	Not classified (NC)
Red	Did not qualify (DNQ)
Black	Disqualified (DSQ)
White	Did not start (DNS)
Blank	Did not participate
Blank	Withdrawn due to injury (INJ)
Blank	Excluded (EX)
Blank	Race cancelled (C)
**Bold**	**Pole Position**
Italics	Lap Leader

=== Manufacturers' Championship ===
Pos	Manufacturer	DAY	INF		MIL	RAM		BAR		MOH		LGS	NJR		Points
1	(Japan) Yamaha	3	5	3	1	1	1	4	1	2	2	2	1	1	331
2	(Japan) Suzuki	2	3	2	4	2	2	1	2	1	1	1	4	2	327
3	(Italy) Ducati	1	1	1	2	3	13	5	6	4	7	3	8	17	245
4	(Japan) Kawasaki	4	13	11	23	9	7	20	Ret	13	15	9	27	14	96
5	(Japan) Honda	30	9	24	21	Ret	8	12	10			10	Ret	DNS	56
6	(United Kingdom) Triumph	DNQ				DNQ	DNQ	23	17	DNS	DNS		7	7	32
7	(United States) Buell	22													0
Pos	Manufacturer	DAY	INF		MIL	RAM		BAR		MOH		LGS	NJR		Points

== Entry list ==
Team	Bike	No.	Rider	Rounds
M4 Suzuki	Suzuki GSX-R600	5	(United States) Dane Westby	All
M4 Suzuki	Suzuki GSX-R600	32	(Colombia) Santiago Villa	1–6, 8
Y.E.S./Pat Clark Sports/Graves Yamaha	Yamaha YZF-R6	6	(United States) Tommy Aquino	All
Team Amantini	Kawasaki Ninja ZX-6R	7	(Venezuela) Fernando Amantini	All
Monster Graves Yamaha	Yamaha YZF-R6	8	(United States) Josh Herrin	All
Celtic Racing/Fast by Feracci	Ducati 848	9	(United States) P. J. Jacobsen	All
Cycle World Attack Performance	Kawasaki Ninja ZX-6R	10	(United States) Eric Bostrom	1
Cycle World Attack Performance	Kawasaki Ninja ZX-6R	73	(United States) J. D. Beach	1
Autolite RIM Racing	Suzuki GSX-R600	11	(United States) Michael Morgan	3–6, 8
Orlando Racing	Kawasaki Ninja ZX-6R	12	(United States) Ricky Orlando	1, 3
HT Moto Yamaha	Yamaha YZF-R6	13	(United States) Melissa Paris	All
Martinez Motorsports	Kawasaki Ninja ZX-6R	14	(United States) Marco Martinez	1
Martinez Motorsports	Kawasaki Ninja ZX-6R	14	(United States) Calvin Martinez	4
Martinez Motorsports	Kawasaki Ninja ZX-6R	22	(United States) Jason Farrell	1
Crozier Motorsports	Yamaha YZF-R6	15	(United States) Cameron Beaubier	1
Wikle Racing	Suzuki GSX-R600	16	(United States) Russ Wikle	1
Triple Crown Industries	Yamaha YZF-R6	20	(United States) Paul Allison (motorcyclist)	All
Triple Crown Industries	Yamaha YZF-R6	34	(United States) Michael Barnes	1
Triple Crown Industries	Yamaha YZF-R6	156	(United States) Austin Dehaven	7–8
Triple Crown Industries	Yamaha YZF-R6	175	(United States) Sam Rozynski	1–3, 5–6, 8
ADR Team	Yamaha YZF-R6	25	(United Kingdom) Kev Coghlan	7–8
Aztrackday.com	Yamaha YZF-R6	26	(United States) Ted Rich	3, 7
Bayside Performance	Suzuki GSX-R600	28	(Canada) Kevin Boisvert	2
Longevity Racing	Ducati 848	29	(United States) Barrett Long	1, 4–5
J&T Racing	Yamaha YZF-R6	30	(United States) Thomas Digiandomenico	1
SRH Plumbing Inc.	Kawasaki Ninja ZX-6R	31	(United States) Shawn Hill	1, 4
PBR	Kawasaki Ninja ZX-6R	37	(United States) John Ashmead	1
Turner's Cycle Racing	Suzuki GSX-R600	38	(United States) Kris Turner	1, 5–6
Bill Smith Racing	Triumph Daytona 675	39	(United Kingdom) David Jones	1
Team Latus Motors	Ducati 848	40	(United States) Jason DiSalvo	1–7
Team Latus Motors	Triumph Daytona 675	40	(United States) Jason DiSalvo	8
Pat Mooney Racing	Buell 1125R	41	(United States) Pat Mooney	1
Kenny Riedmann	Triumph Daytona 675	42	(Canada) Kenny Riedmann	4–6, 8
Vesrah Suzuki	Suzuki GSX-R600	44	(United States) Taylor Knapp	All
Vesrah Suzuki	Suzuki GSX-R600	57	(United States) Cory West	All
Top Shelf Motorcycles Racing	Ducati 848	45	(United States) David Sadowski, Jr.	1–5, 7
Top Shelf Motorcycles Racing	Ducati 848	77	(United States) Matthew Sadowski	1–5, 7
Don Odom Racing	Honda CBR1000RR	46	(United States) Tyler Odom	2–5, 7–8
Sons Mexico	Ducati 848	50	(Mexico) Dirk Sanchez	5, 7
Desmomaniacs Ducati	Ducati 848	56	(United States) Les Moscariello	1
Broken Egg Motorsports	Yamaha YZF-R6	58	(United States) Christian Cronin	3, 6
Roberson Motorsports	Ducati 848	59	(United States) Jake Holden	1–3
Jake Holden Racing	Ducati 848	59	(United States) Jake Holden	4, 6–7
Jake Holden Racing	Yamaha YZF-R6	116	(United States) Cameron Beaubier	6–8
Sport Bike Night Racing	Yamaha YZF-R6	62	(United States) Shaun Summers	7
Proper Wear/Karma Tequila Racing	Yamaha YZF-R6	63	(United States) Skip Salenius	7–8
H-n-H Racing	Kawasaki Ninja ZX-6R	65	(United States) Dylon Husband	3
Schaumburg Audi	Kawasaki Ninja ZX-6R	66	(United States) Brian Hall	4
DJ Motosport	Suzuki GSX-R600	68	(New Zealand) Dominic Jones	8
Richie Morris Racing	Suzuki GSX-R600	69	(United States) Danny Eslick	All
RayBren Racing	Honda CBR600RR	71	(United States) Ray Hofman	1, 4
Bryce Prince Racing	Yamaha YZF-R6	72	(United States) Bryce Prince	2–3, 7–8
Inotherm Yamaha Racing Team Slovenia	Yamaha YZF-R6	74	(Slovenia) Boštjan Skubic	1, 7
LTD Racing Y.E.S Yamaha	Yamaha YZF-R6	75	(United States) Huntley Nash	All
LTD Racing Y.E.S Yamaha	Yamaha YZF-R6	890	(United States) Raul Alzate	6–8
GP Bike Parts Racing	Yamaha YZF-R6	76	(United States) Ricky Corey	5
GP Bike Parts Racing	Yamaha YZF-R6	116	(United States) Cameron Beaubier	2–5
GP Bike Parts Racing	Yamaha YZF-R6	129	(United States) Tyler O'Hara	All
Wacker Racing LLC	Suzuki GSX-R600	78	(United States) Reese Wacker	1
Humphryes Racing	Suzuki GSX-R600	81	(United States) Wes Humphryes	1, 5
Wow Racing	Yamaha YZF-R6	82	(United States) Eli Edwards	3
KSW Racing	Suzuki GSX-R600	84	(United States) Anthony Fania	1
Speed Tech Performance	Kawasaki Ninja ZX-6R	86	(United States) Jason Farrell	4
Speed Tech Performance	Kawasaki Ninja ZX-6R	94	(United States) Dave Ebben	4
Frisco Tap House/Markbilt	Yamaha YZF-R6	88	(United States) Mike Selpe	8
Project 1 Atlanta	Yamaha YZF-R6	98	(United States) Jake Zemke	1
Erik Buell Racing	Buell 1125R	99	(United States) Geoff May	1
Ducshop Racing	Ducati 848	100	(Canada) Emerson Connor	6
NA Racing – MFM	Honda CBR600RR	118	(Mexico) Nahun Álvarez	3, 5, 7–8
Zlock Racing	Kawasaki Ninja ZX-6R	121	(United States) Brian Pinkstaff	7
Witchkraft Racing	Yamaha YZF-R6	133	(United States) Kyle Wyman	6, 8
Hale Racing	Yamaha YZF-R6	139	(United States) Lenny Hale	7
Cerciari Racing School	Suzuki GSX-R600	144	(Brazil) Luiz Cerciari	1
Sanders Racing	Yamaha YZF-R6	150	(United States) Lyles Sanders	1
CS Carey Racing	Yamaha YZF-R6	159	(United States) Matt Hall	4–5
Josh Galster Racing	Yamaha YZF-R6	174	(United States) Josh Galster	2–3, 6–8
Team TDS Guns/Fast50s.com/Defense Industries	Yamaha YZF-R6	181	(United States) Craig Mason	2, 7
Impact Racing	Yamaha YZF-R6	195	(United States) Jeremy Simmons	3
Metric Devil Moto	Kawasaki Ninja ZX-6R	240	(United States) Giuseppe Messina	1
Phantom Freightlines Racing	Suzuki GSX-R600	291	(Canada) Scott Decker	1
Peak Performance Racing	Kawasaki Ninja ZX-6R	300	(United States) Patrick McCord	2–3
Shreve Racing	Yamaha YZF-R6	311	(United States) Mike T. Shreve	3
Mom & Dad Powersports	Yamaha YZF-R6	410	(United States) Kelcey Walker	3
Get Some Racing	Kawasaki Ninja ZX-6R	444	(United States) Oscar Covarrubias	2, 7
McNology Racing	Yamaha YZF-R6	528	(United States) Mark McCormick	1
McNology Racing	Yamaha YZF-R6	594	(United States) David McPherson	1
Run 1 Racing Motorsports	Yamaha YZF-R6	825	(United States) Joey Pascarella	1, 3
Dimick Racing	Yamaha YZF-R6	909	(United States) Dalton Dimick	3, 7

Key
Regular Rider
Wildcard Rider
Replacement Rider

== See also ==
- 2011 AMA Pro American Superbike Championship
