= 2009 AMA Pro Daytona Sportbike Championship =

American motorcycle racing series

Seasons
- ← 2008 (FX) 2010 →

The 2009 AMA Pro Daytona Sportbike Championship was the first running of the AMA Pro Daytona Sportbike Championship, an American motorcycle racing series that acts as a feeder series for the AMA Pro American Superbike Championship. The series replaced the AMA Formula Xtreme Championship. Danny Eslick won his first championship riding a Buell. Mike Baldwin was the crew chief.

== Calendar and results ==
| No | | Circuit | Location | Date | Pole position | Fastest lap | Winner |
|---|---|---|---|---|---|---|---|
| 1 | R1 | March 6 | Daytona International Speedway (Daytona 200) | Daytona Beach, Florida | (United States) Ben Bostrom | (United Kingdom) Chaz Davies | (United States) Ben Bostrom |
| 2 | R1 | March 21 | Auto Club Speedway | Fontana, California | (United Kingdom) Jamie Hacking | (United States) Danny Eslick | (United States) Danny Eslick |
| 2 | R2 | March 22 | Auto Club Speedway | Fontana, California | (United Kingdom) Jamie Hacking | (United Kingdom) Jamie Hacking | (United States) Danny Eslick |
| 3 | R1 | April 4 | Road Atlanta | Braselton, Georgia | (United States) Jason DiSalvo | (Colombia) Martín Cárdenas | (Colombia) Martín Cárdenas |
| 3 | R2 | April 5 | Road Atlanta | Braselton, Georgia | (United States) Jason DiSalvo | (United States) Roger Hayden | (United States) Danny Eslick |
| 4 | R1 | May 2 | Barber Motorsports Park | Leeds, Alabama | (United States) Jason DiSalvo | (United Kingdom) Chaz Davies | (Colombia) Martín Cárdenas |
| 4 | R2 | May 3 | Barber Motorsports Park | Leeds, Alabama | (United States) Jason DiSalvo | (Colombia) Martín Cárdenas | (Colombia) Martín Cárdenas |
| 5 | R1 | May 16 | Infineon Raceway | Sonoma, California | (United States) Jason DiSalvo | (Colombia) Martín Cárdenas | (Colombia) Martín Cárdenas |
| 5 | R2 | May 17 | Infineon Raceway | Sonoma, California | (United States) Jason DiSalvo | (Colombia) Martín Cárdenas | (Colombia) Martín Cárdenas |
| 6 | R1 | June 6 | Road America | Elkhart Lake, Wisconsin | (United States) Jason DiSalvo | (Canada) Chris Peris | (Canada) Chris Peris |
| 6 | R2 | June 7 | Road America | Elkhart Lake, Wisconsin | (United States) Jason DiSalvo | (United States) Jake Zemke | (Colombia) Martín Cárdenas |
| 7 | R1 | July 5 | Mazda Raceway Laguna Seca | Monterey, California | (Colombia) Martín Cárdenas | (Colombia) Martín Cárdenas | (United States) Ben Bostrom |
| 8 | R1 | July 18 | Mid-Ohio Sports Car Course | Lexington, Ohio | (United States) Danny Eslick | (United States) Jake Zemke | (United States) Danny Eslick |
| 8 | R2 | July 19 | Mid-Ohio Sports Car Course | Lexington, Ohio | (United States) Danny Eslick | (United States) Danny Eslick | (United States) Danny Eslick |
| 9 | R1 | August 1 | Heartland Park Topeka | Topeka, Kansas | (United States) Jason DiSalvo | (United States) Danny Eslick | (United States) Danny Eslick |
| 9 | R2 | August 2 | Heartland Park Topeka | Topeka, Kansas | (United States) Jason DiSalvo | (United States) Josh Herrin | (Colombia) Martín Cárdenas |
| 10 | R1 | August 15 | Virginia International Raceway | Danville, Virginia | (United States) Taylor Knapp | (United Kingdom) Jamie Hacking | (United States) Josh Herrin |
| 10 | R2 | August 16 | Virginia International Raceway | Danville, Virginia | (United States) Taylor Knapp | (United States) Jason DiSalvo | (United States) Josh Herrin |
| 11 | R1 | September 5 | New Jersey Motorsports Park | Millville, New Jersey | (United States) Jason DiSalvo | (United States) Josh Herrin | (United States) Josh Herrin |
| 11 | R2 | September 6 | New Jersey Motorsports Park | Millville, New Jersey | (United States) Jason DiSalvo | (United States) Jake Zemke | (United States) Josh Herrin |

== Riders' standings ==
| Pos | Rider | Make | DAY | FON | | RAT | | BAR | | INF | | RAM | | LAG | M-O | | HRT | | VIR | | N-J | | Pts |
| Pos | Rider | Make | DAY | R1 | R2 | R1 | R2 | R1 | R2 | R1 | R2 | R1 | R2 | LAG | R1 | R2 | R1 | R2 | R1 | R2 | R1 | R2 | Pts |
|---|---|---|---|---|---|---|---|---|---|---|---|---|---|---|---|---|---|---|---|---|---|---|---|
| 1 | (United States) Daniel Eslick | Buell | 73 | 1 | 1 | 3 | 1 | 8 | 3 | 5 | 12 | 6 | 5 | 8 | 1 | 1 | 1 | 3 | 7 | 2 | 5 | 7 | 387 |
| 2 | (United States) Josh Herrin | Yamaha | 2 | 6 | 5 | 6 | 2 | 4 | 30 | 31 | 3 | 13 | 13 | 3 | 2 | 8 | 2 | 2 | 1 | 1 | 1 | 1 | 382 |
| 3 | (Colombia) Martín Cárdenas | Suzuki | 9 | 3 | 4 | 1 | 34 | 1 | 1 | 1 | 1 | 3 | 1 | **36** | 12 | 3 | 18 | 1 | 9 | 11 | 42 | 37 | 340 |
| 4 | (United States) Jamie Hacking | Kawasaki | 4 | **2** | **2** | 7 | 5 | 3 | 2 | 2 | 13 | 8 | 9 | 9 | 35 | 2 | | | 3 | 9 | 12 | 5 | 299 |
| 5 | (United States) Jason DiSalvo | Suzuki | 3 | 4 | 3 | 19 | 7 | 2 | 7 | 16 | 2 | 12 | 3 | 32 | 9 | 11 | 6 | 4 | 2 | 27 | 13 | 8 | 283 |
| 6 | (United States) Jake Zemke | Honda | 11 | 5 | 6 | 4 | 39 | 7 | 28 | 8 | 5 | 36 | 2 | 29 | 4 | 10 | 7 | 6 | 4 | 7 | 6 | 2 | 258 |
| 7 | (Canada) Chris Peris | Honda | DSQ | 7 | 10 | 9 | 3 | 10 | 23 | 7 | 7 | 1 | 4 | 7 | 8 | 12 | 10 | 10 | 33 | 8 | 7 | 4 | 244 |
| 8 | (United States) Tommy Aquino | Yamaha | 61 | 10 | 8 | 8 | 32 | 5 | 13 | 6 | 4 | 14 | 18 | 4 | 3 | 9 | 3 | 5 | 32 | 3 | 31 | 3 | 235 |
| 9 | (United Kingdom) Chaz Davies | Aprilia | 7 | 8 | 7 | 5 | 6 | 28 | 4 | 4 | 31 | 39 | 8 | 2 | 5 | 7 | 4 | 36 | 36 | 30 | 2 | 29 | 219 |
| 10 | (United States) Steve Rapp | Yamaha | 12 | 9 | 9 | 41 | 9 | 6 | 14 | 3 | 6 | 27 | 12 | 6 | 6 | 6 | 34 | 15 | 5 | 25 | 3 | 30 | 200 |
| 11 | (United States) Taylor Knapp | Buell | | | | 10 | 4 | 9 | 15 | 34 | 9 | 4 | 6 | 37 | 7 | 4 | 12 | 8 | 17 | 4 | 21 | 12 | 178 |
| 12 | (United States) Roger Hayden | Kawasaki | | | | 2 | 31 | 14 | 37 | 9 | 40 | 2 | 11 | 38 | 40 | 5 | 9 | 7 | 10 | 5 | 38 | 6 | 164 |
| 22 | (United States) Ben Bostrom | Yamaha | **1** | | | | | | | | | | | 1 | | | | | | | | | 62 |
| 23 | (Argentina) Leandro Mercado | Kawasaki | 10 | 11 | 11 | | | | | | | | | | | | | | | | | | 31 |
| 25 | (United States) Barrett Long | Yamaha | 6 | 13 | 18 | | | | | | | | | | | | | | | | | | 26 |
| 20 | (United States) Shawn Higbee | Buell | 5 | 15 | 35 | | | | | | | | | | | | | | | | | | 22 |
| 18 | (United States) Dane Westby | Yamaha | 8 | 21 | 14 | | | | | | | | | | | | | | | | | | 20 |
| 16 | (Australia) Damian Cudlin | Yamaha | 13 | 18 | 16 | | | | | | | | | | | | | | | | | | 16 |
| 15 | (United States) Michael Barnes | Buell | 25 | 12 | 15 | | | | | | | | | | | | | | | | | | 15 |
| 17 | (United States) Christopher Fillmore | Yamaha | | 14 | 13 | | | | | | | | | | | | | | | | | | 15 |
| 19 | (Venezuela) Robertino Pietri | Yamaha | 66 | 31 | 12 | | | | | | | | | | | | | | | | | | 9 |
| 20 | (United States) Garrett Carter | Yamaha | 17 | 17 | 36 | | | | | | | | | | | | | | | | | | 8 |
| 23 | (United States) Russ Wikle | Suzuki | 15 | | | | | | | | | | | | | | | | | | | | 6 |
| 24 | (Canada) Miguel Duhamel | Suzuki | 16 | | | | | | | | | | | | | | | | | | | | 5 |
| 25 | (United States) Eric Wood | Honda | 18 | | | | | | | | | | | | | | | | | | | | 3 |
| 26 | (Colombia) Santiago Villa | Suzuki | 19 | 25 | 21 | | | | | | | | | | | | | | | | | | 2 |
| 27 | (United States) Shea Fouchek | Honda | | 19 | Ret | | | | | | | | | | | | | | | | | | 2 |
| 28 | (United States) Jeffrey Tigert | Honda | 27 | 20 | | | | | | | | | | | | | | | | | | | 1 |
| 29 | (United States) Tyler Odom | Honda | 20 | 34 | 34 | | | | | | | | | | | | | | | | | | 1 |
| 30 | (United States) Josh Hayes | Yamaha | Ret | | | | | | | | | | | | | | | | | | | | 1 |
| 31 | (United States) Melissa Paris | Yamaha | 21 | | | | | | | | | | | | | | | | | | | | 0 |
| 32 | (Venezuela) Fernando Amantini | Kawasaki | 51 | 22 | 25 | | | | | | | | | | | | | | | | | | 0 |
| 33 | (United States) Ricky Parker | Yamaha | | Ret | 22 | | | | | | | | | | | | | | | | | | 0 |
| 34 | (United States) Eric Haugo | Yamaha | 56 | 23 | 23 | | | | | | | | | | | | | | | | | | 0 |
| 35 | (United States) Ty Howard | Aprilia | 23 | | | | | | | | | | | | | | | | | | | | 0 |
| 36 | (United States) Sahar Zvik | Suzuki | | 24 | 24 | | | | | | | | | | | | | | | | | | 0 |
| 37 | (United States) David Sadowski, Jr. | Yamaha | 24 | | | | | | | | | | | | | | | | | | | | 0 |
| 38 | (United States) Larry Myers | Kawasaki | 50 | 26 | 26 | | | | | | | | | | | | | | | | | | 0 |
| 39 | (United States) Josh Bryan | Buell | 34 | 27 | 28 | | | | | | | | | | | | | | | | | | 0 |
| 40 | (United States) Chris Clark | Yamaha | | 36 | 27 | | | | | | | | | | | | | | | | | | 0 |
| 41 | (United States) Dylon Husband | Kawasaki | 25 | 28 | 30 | | | | | | | | | | | | | | | | | | 0 |
| 42 | (United States) Ryan Patterson | Yamaha | 28 | | | | | | | | | | | | | | | | | | | | 0 |
| 43 | (United States) Charles Sipp | Yamaha | 42 | 29 | 29 | | | | | | | | | | | | | | | | | | 0 |
| 44 | (Guatemala) Marcos Reichert | Yamaha | 29 | | | | | | | | | | | | | | | | | | | | 0 |
| 45 | (United States) Chip Yates | Suzuki | | 30 | 31 | | | | | | | | | | | | | | | | | | 0 |
| 46 | (United States) Ricky Orlando | Kawasaki | 30 | | | | | | | | | | | | | | | | | | | | 0 |
| 47 | (United States) Armando Ferrer | Suzuki | 31 | | | | | | | | | | | | | | | | | | | | 0 |
| 48 | (United States) Jamie Hall | Yamaha | | 32 | 32 | | | | | | | | | | | | | | | | | | 0 |
| 49 | (Slovenia) Boštjan Skubic | Yamaha | 32 | | | | | | | | | | | | | | | | | | | | 0 |
| 50 | (Canada) Kevin Boisvert | Suzuki | | 33 | 33 | | | | | | | | | | | | | | | | | | 0 |
| 51 | (United States) Nicky Moore | Kawasaki | 33 | | | | | | | | | | | | | | | | | | | | 0 |
| 52 | (United States) Dustin Ohara | Suzuki | | 35 | | | | | | | | | | | | | | | | | | | 0 |
| 53 | (United States) Mark Crozier | Triumph | 36 | | | | | | | | | | | | | | | | | | | | 0 |
| 54 | (United States) Anthony Fania | Suzuki | 37 | | | | | | | | | | | | | | | | | | | | 0 |
| 55 | (Canada) Matthew McBride | Suzuki | 38 | | | | | | | | | | | | | | | | | | | | 0 |
| 56 | (United States) Meghan Stiles | Yamaha | 39 | | | | | | | | | | | | | | | | | | | | 0 |
| 57 | (United States) Shane Narbonne | Aprilia | 40 | | | | | | | | | | | | | | | | | | | | 0 |
| 58 | (United States) David McPherson | Yamaha | 41 | | | | | | | | | | | | | | | | | | | | 0 |
| 59 | (United States) Mark McCormick | Yamaha | 43 | | | | | | | | | | | | | | | | | | | | 0 |
| 60 | (United States) Dean Mizdal | Kawasaki | 44 | | | | | | | | | | | | | | | | | | | | 0 |
| 61 | (Canada) Jean Paul Tache | Yamaha | 45 | | | | | | | | | | | | | | | | | | | | 0 |
| 62 | (United States) Lloyd Bayley | Yamaha | 46 | | | | | | | | | | | | | | | | | | | | 0 |
| 63 | (United States) Troy Vincent | Suzuki | 47 | | | | | | | | | | | | | | | | | | | | 0 |
| 64 | (United States) Gene Burcham | Ducati | 48 | | | | | | | | | | | | | | | | | | | | 0 |
| 65 | (United States) Mike deBrabant | Suzuki | 54 | | | | | | | | | | | | | | | | | | | | 0 |
| 66 | (United States) Ray Hofman | Honda | 55 | | | | | | | | | | | | | | | | | | | | 0 |
| 67 | (United States) Scott Jensen | Aprilia | 57 | | | | | | | | | | | | | | | | | | | | 0 |
| 68 | (United States) Clinton Gibson | Kawasaki | 58 | | | | | | | | | | | | | | | | | | | | 0 |
| 69 | (United States) Craig Moodie | Yamaha | 59 | | | | | | | | | | | | | | | | | | | | 0 |
| 70 | (United States) Bryan Bemisderfer | Buell | 60 | | | | | | | | | | | | | | | | | | | | 0 |
| 71 | (United States) Justin Filice | Triumph | 62 | | | | | | | | | | | | | | | | | | | | 0 |
| 72 | (United States) James Digiandomenico | Yamaha | 63 | | | | | | | | | | | | | | | | | | | | 0 |
| 73 | (United States) Kris Turner | Suzuki | 64 | | | | | | | | | | | | | | | | | | | | 0 |
| 74 | (United States) Paul Schwemmer | Kawasaki | 65 | | | | | | | | | | | | | | | | | | | | 0 |
| 75 | (United States) Rodney Vest | Suzuki | 67 | | | | | | | | | | | | | | | | | | | | 0 |
| 76 | (United States) Kyle Keesee | Kawasaki | 68 | | | | | | | | | | | | | | | | | | | | 0 |
| 77 | (United States) Daniel Parkerson | Kawasaki | 69 | | | | | | | | | | | | | | | | | | | | 0 |
| 78 | (United States) Ryan Elleby | Aprilia | DNS | | | | | | | | | | | | | | | | | | | | 0 |
| 79 | (United States) Jason Quillman | Yamaha | DNS | | | | | | | | | | | | | | | | | | | | 0 |
| 80 | (United States) Ben Thompson | Aprilia | 22 | 37 | 17 | | | | | | | | | | | | | | | | | | -1 |
| 81 | (Canada) Alan Schmidt | Buell | DSQ | 38 | 20 | | | | | | | | | | | | | | | | | | -4 |
| 82 | (United States) Alistair Douglas | Suzuki | 52 | | | | | | | | | | | | | | | | | | | | -5 |
| 83 | (United States) Andres Londono | Yamaha | 53 | | | | | | | | | | | | | | | | | | | | -5 |
| 84 | (United States) John Ashmead | Kawasaki | DSQ | | | | | | | | | | | | | | | | | | | | -5 |
| Pos | Rider | Make | DAY | FON | | RAT | | BAR | | INF | | RAM | | LAG | M-O | | HRT | | VIR | | N-J | | Pts |

| Colour | Result |
|---|---|
| Gold | Winner (1) |
| Silver | 2nd place (2) |
| Bronze | 3rd place (3) |
| Green | Finished, in points (4-20) |
| Blue | Finished, no points (21+) |
| Purple | Did not finish (Ret) |
| Purple | Not classified (NC) |
| Red | Did not qualify (DNQ) |
| Black | Disqualified (DSQ) |
| White | Did not start (DNS) |
| Blank | Did not participate |
| Blank | Withdrawn due to injury (INJ) |
| Blank | Excluded (EX) |
| Blank | Race cancelled (C) |
| **Bold** | **Pole Position** |
| Italics | Lap Leader |

== Entry list ==
| Team | Constructor | Motorcycle | No | Rider |
|---|---|---|---|---|
| Team Graves Yamaha | Yamaha | Yamaha YZF-R6 | 1s | (United States) Ben Bostrom |
| Team Graves Yamaha | Yamaha | Yamaha YZF-R6 | 4 | (United States) Josh Hayes |
| Team Graves Yamaha | Yamaha | Yamaha YZF-R6 | 6 | (United States) Tommy Aquino |
| Team Graves Yamaha | Yamaha | Yamaha YZF-R6 | 8 | (United States) Josh Herrin |
| Erion Racing | Honda | Honda CBR600RR | 1x | (United States) Jake Zemke |
| Erion Racing | Honda | Honda CBR600RR | 10 | (Canada) Chris Peris |
| M4 Suzuki | Suzuki | Suzuki GSX-R600 | 3 | (United States) Kris Turner |
| M4 Suzuki | Suzuki | Suzuki GSX-R600 | 36 | (Colombia) Martín Cárdenas |
| M4 Suzuki | Suzuki | Suzuki GSX-R600 | 40 | (United States) Jason DiSalvo |
| Roadracingworld.com/Suzuki | Suzuki | Suzuki GSX-R600 | 5 | (United States) Russ Wikle |
| Roadracingworld.com/Suzuki | Suzuki | Suzuki GSX-R600 | 32 | (Colombia) Santiago Villa |
| Amantini Racing | Kawasaki | Kawasaki ZX-6R | 7 | (Venezuela) Fernando Amantini |
| Bruce Rossmeyers Daytona Racing/ RMR Buell | Buell | Buell 1125R | 9 | (United States) Danny Eslick |
| Higbee-Racing.com | Buell | Buell 1125R | 11 | (United States) Shawn Higbee |
| Team Hooters Aprilia | Aprilia | Aprilia RSV1000R | 12 | (United States) Shane Narbonne |
| Team Hooters Aprilia | Aprilia | Aprilia RSV1000R | 21 | (United States) Ryan Elleby |
| Crozier Motorsports | Triumph | Triumph Daytona 675 | 14 | (United States) Mark Crozierr |
| Suzuki/Blackfoot/Picotte Motorsports | Suzuki | Suzuki GSX-R600 | 17 | (Canada) Miguel Duhamel |
| Liberty Waves Racing | Yamaha | Yamaha YZF-R6 | 19 | (United States) Eric Haugo |
| Sadowski Brothers | Yamaha | Yamaha YZF-R6 | 22 | (United States) David Sadowski, Jr. |
| Four Feathers Racing | Yamaha | Yamaha YZF-R6 | 26 | (Canada) Jean Paul Tache |
| Four Feathers Racing | Yamaha | Yamaha YZF-R6 | 27 | (United States) Steve Rapp |
| Giant Racing | Suzuki | Suzuki GSX-R600 | 28 | (United States) Alistair Douglas |
| Paradigm Racing | Yamaha | Yamaha YZF-R6 | 29 | (United States) Barrett Long |
| R & B Motorsports | Triumph | Triumph Daytona 675 | 30 | (United States) Justin Filice |
| Garrett Carter Racing | Yamaha | Yamaha YZF-R6 | 31 | (United States) Garrett Carter |
| Vallely Racing/Riders Choice | Suzuki | Suzuki GSX-R600 | 33 | (Canada) Matthew McBride |
| GEICO Powersports/RMR Buell Racing | Buell | Buell 1125R | 34 | (United States) Michael Barnes |
| Brady Racing | Kawasaki | Kawasaki ZX-6R | 37 | (United States) John Ashmead |
| M Racing | Kawasaki | Kawasaki ZX-6R | 38 | (United States) Dean Mizdal |
| Fouchek Racing | Honda | Honda CBR600RR | 39 | (United States) Shea Fouchek |
| Latus Motors Racing | Buell | Buell 1125R | 45 | (United States) Josh Bryan |
| Latus Motors Racing | Buell | Buell 1125R | 54 | (Canada) Alan Schmidt |
| Don Odom Racing | Honda | Honda CBR600RR | 46 | (United States) Tyler Odom |
| Bazzaz | Yamaha | Yamaha YZF-R6 | 48 | (United States) Chris Clark |
| Team E.S.P. Yamaha | Yamaha | Yamaha YZF-R6 | 51 | (Australia) Damian Cudlin |
| Team E.S.P. Yamaha | Yamaha | Yamaha YZF-R6 | 311 | (Venezuela) Robertino Pietri |
| Team Woodcraft/Heyser Racing | Honda | Honda CBR600RR | 53 | (United States) Eric Wood |
| CF Racing | Yamaha | Yamaha YZF-R6 | 55 | (United States) Christopher Fillmore |
| Factory Aprilia Millennium Technologies Team | Aprilia | Aprilia RSV1000R | 57 | (United Kingdom) Chaz Davies |
| Factory Aprilia Millennium Technologies Team | Aprilia | Aprilia RSV1000R | 97 | (United States) Ben Thompson |
| Team Beck Racing | Yamaha | Yamaha YZF-R6 | 60 | (United States) Michael Beck |
| Chronic Motorsports | Yamaha | Yamaha YZF-R6 | 63 | (United States) Lloyd Bayley |
| TeamHurtByAccident.com | Suzuki | Suzuki GSX-R600 | 64 | (United States) Armando Ferrer |
| Ridesmart Motorcycle Schools | Aprilia | Aprilia RSV1000R | 67 | (United States) Ty Howard |
| Bayside Performance | Suzuki | Suzuki GSX-R600 | 68 | (Canada) Kevin Boisvert |
| BSB/Keesee Racing | Kawasaki | Kawasaki ZX-6R | 69 | (United States) Kyle Keesee |
| JP Motorsports | Kawasaki | Kawasaki ZX-6R | 70 | (United States) Daniel Parkerson |
| Team Pur Sang Racing | Kawasaki | Kawasaki ZX-6R | 73 | (United States) Dylon Husband |
| Team Pur Sang Racing | Kawasaki | Kawasaki ZX-6R | 370 | (United States) Clint Gibson |
| Black Hole Racing | Aprilia | Aprilia RSV1000R | 76 | (United States) Scott Jensen |
| KSW Insurance Racing | Suzuki | Suzuki GSX-R600 | 84 | (United States) Anthony Fania |
| Monster Energy Attack Kawasaki | Kawasaki | Kawasaki ZX-6R | 88 | (United Kingdom) Jamie Hacking |
| Monster Energy Attack Kawasaki | Kawasaki | Kawasaki ZX-6R | 95 | (Argentina) Leandro Mercado |
| Swigz.com Pro Racing | Suzuki | Suzuki GSX-R600 | 89 | (United States) Chip Yates |
| GBR Motors | Ducati | Ducati 848 | 94 | (United States) Gene Burcham |
| RPR Racing | Yamaha | Yamaha YZF-R6 | 96 | (United States) Ricky Parker |
| HDFR Racing | Buell | Buell 1125R | 98 | (United States) Bryan Bemisderfer |
| Rockwall Performance | Yamaha | Yamaha YZF-R6 | 101 | (Guatemala) Marcos Reichert |
| deBrabant Motorsports | Suzuki | Suzuki GSX-R600 | 111 | (United States) Mike deBrabant |
| Ricky Orlando Racing | Kawasaki | Kawasaki ZX-6R | 112 | (United States) Ricky Orlando |
| Dry Rider Racing | Yamaha | Yamaha YZF-R6 | 113 | (United States) Craig Moodie |
| D & R Racing | Yamaha | Yamaha YZF-R6 | 125 | (United States) Ryan Patterson |
| TWC/RoadRacePrep.com | Yamaha | Yamaha YZF-R6 | 126 | (United States) Jamie Hall |
| SRK Racing | Suzuki | Suzuki GSX-R600 | 161 | (United States) Sahar Zvik |
| WisconsinSportbikes.net | Honda | Honda CBR600RR | 171 | (United States) Ray Hofman |
| Old Pros Racing | Kawasaki | Kawasaki ZX-6R | 177 | (United States) Paul Schwemmer |
| TigerTeam Racing | Honda | Honda CBR600RR | 191 | (United States) Jeffrey Tigert |
| AAA Lift Truck | Kawasaki | Kawasaki ZX-6R | 199 | (United States) Larry Myers |
| Destiny Racing | Yamaha | Yamaha YZF-R6 | 204 | (United States) Andres Londono |
| Westby Racing/Kneedraggers.com | Yamaha | Yamaha YZF-R6 | 213 | (United States) Dane Westby |
| Walt Sipp Racing | Yamaha | Yamaha YZF-R6 | 221 | (United States) Charles Sipp |
| R & R Racing | Suzuki | Suzuki GSX-R600 | 310 | (United States) Rodney Vest |
| Quillman Motorsports | Yamaha | Yamaha YZF-R6 | 321 | (United States) Jason Quillman |
| J & T Racing | Yamaha | Yamaha YZF-R6 | 322 | (United States) James Digiandomenico |
| MarkBilt | Yamaha | Yamaha YZF-R6 | 413 | (United States) Melissa Paris |
| Inotherm Racing Team | Yamaha | Yamaha YZF-R6 | 474 | (Slovenia) Boštjan Skubic |
| Inotherm Racing Team | Yamaha | Yamaha YZF-R6 | 484 | (Slovenia) Boštjan Pintar |
| Nicky Moore | Kawasaki | Kawasaki ZX-6R | 505 | (United States) Nicky Moore |
| McNology Racing | Yamaha | Yamaha YZF-R6 | 528 | (United States) Mark McCormick |
| McNology Racing | Yamaha | Yamaha YZF-R6 | 594 | (United States) David McPherson |
| TVH Racing | Suzuki | Suzuki GSX-R600 | 715 | (United States) Troy Vincent |
| Team Stiles | Yamaha | Yamaha YZF-R6 | 746 | (United States) Meghan Stiles |
| RDS Cycles | Suzuki | Suzuki GSX-R600 | 819 | (United States) Dustin Ohara |

Key
Regular Rider
Wildcard Rider
Replacement Rider

- All entries utilize Dunlop tyres.

== See also ==
- 2009 AMA Pro American Superbike Championship season
