= 2009 AMA Pro Racing Championship season =

The 2009 AMA Pro Racing Championship season consisted of the American Motorcyclist Association's professional motorcycle racing series:

- 2009 AMA Pro American Superbike Championship season
- 2009 AMA Pro Daytona Sportbike Championship season
- 2009 AMA Pro Supersport Championship season
