= 2012 AMA Pro Daytona Sportbike Championship =

American motorcycle racing series

Seasons
- ← 2011 2013 →

The 2012 AMA Pro Daytona Sportbike Championship was the fourth running of the AMA Pro Daytona Sportbike Championship. The championship covered 11 rounds beginning at Daytona International Speedway on March 17 and concluded at NOLA Motorsports Park on October 7. The championship was won by Colombian Martín Cárdenas aboard a Suzuki.

== Calendar ==
Round		Date	Circuit	Location	Pole position	Fastest lap	Winning rider	Winning team
1	R1	March 17	Daytona International Speedway	Daytona Beach, Florida	(Colombia) Martín Cárdenas	(New York (state)) Jason DiSalvo	(California) Joey Pascarella	Project 1 Atlanta
2	R1	April 21	Road Atlanta	Braselton, Georgia	(Colombia) Martín Cárdenas	(Colombia) Martín Cárdenas	(Colombia) Martín Cárdenas	Geico Suzuki
2	R2	April 22	Road Atlanta	Braselton, Georgia	(Colombia) Martín Cárdenas	(New York (state)) Jason DiSalvo	(Colombia) Martín Cárdenas	Geico Suzuki
3	R1	May 5	Infineon Raceway	Sonoma, California	(New York (state)) Jason DiSalvo	(New York (state)) Jason DiSalvo	(Colombia) Martín Cárdenas	Geico Suzuki
3	R2	May 6	Infineon Raceway	Sonoma, California	(New York (state)) Jason DiSalvo	(Kentucky) Tommy Hayden	(New York (state)) Jason DiSalvo	Team Lanus Motors Racing
4	R1	May 28	Miller Motorsports Park^{†}	Tooele, Utah	(Colombia) Martín Cárdenas	(Colombia) Martín Cárdenas	(Colombia) Martín Cárdenas	Geico Suzuki
5	R1	June 2	Road America	Elkhart Lake, Wisconsin	(New York (state)) Jason DiSalvo	(California) Bobby Fong	(Colombia) Martín Cárdenas	Geico Suzuki
5	R2	June 3	Road America	Elkhart Lake, Wisconsin	(New York (state)) Jason DiSalvo	(Colombia) Martín Cárdenas	(Colombia) Martín Cárdenas	Geico Suzuki
6	R1	June 23	Barber Motorsports Park	Leeds, Alabama	(California) Cameron Beaubier	(California) Cameron Beaubier	(California) Cameron Beaubier	Yamaha Extended Service, Graves, Yamaha
6	R2	June 24	Barber Motorsports Park	Leeds, Alabama	(California) Cameron Beaubier	(California) Cameron Beaubier	(California) Cameron Beaubier	Yamaha Extended Service, Graves, Yamaha
7	R1	July 14	Mid-Ohio Sports Car Course	Lexington, Ohio	(New York (state)) Jason DiSalvo	(California) Cameron Beaubier	(Oklahoma) Dane Westby	M4 Broaster Chicken Suzuki
7	R2	July 15	Mid-Ohio Sports Car Course	Lexington, Ohio	(New York (state)) Jason DiSalvo	(California) Bobby Fong	(California) Cameron Beaubier	Yamaha Extended Service, Graves, Yamaha
8	R1	July 29	Mazda Raceway Laguna Seca^{‡}	Monterey, California	(Colombia) Martín Cárdenas	(Kentucky) Tommy Hayden	(California) Cameron Beaubier	Yamaha Extended Service, Graves, Yamaha
9	R1	September 8	New Jersey Motorsports Park	Millville, New Jersey	(Colombia) Martín Cárdenas	(California) Cameron Beaubier	(California) Cameron Beaubier	Yamaha Extended Service, Graves, Yamaha
9	R2	September 9	New Jersey Motorsports Park	Millville, New Jersey	(Colombia) Martín Cárdenas	(Oklahoma) Dane Westby	(Colombia) Martín Cárdenas	Geico Suzuki
10	R1	September 22	Homestead-Miami Speedway	Homestead, Florida	(California) Cameron Beaubier	(Texas) Jake Gagne	(California) Cameron Beaubier	Yamaha Extended Service, Graves, Yamaha
10	R2	September 23	Homestead-Miami Speedway	Homestead, Florida	(California) Cameron Beaubier	(California) Cameron Beaubier	(Texas) Jake Gagne	Road Race Factory/Red Bull
11	R1	October 6	NOLA Motorsports Park	Avondale, Louisiana	(Texas) Jake Gagne	(California) Cameron Beaubier	(California) Cameron Beaubier	Yamaha Extended Service, Graves, Yamaha
11	R2	October 7	NOLA Motorsports Park	Avondale, Louisiana	(Texas) Jake Gagne	(California) Cameron Beaubier	(Colombia) Martín Cárdenas	Geico Suzuki

† = World Superbike Weekend
‡ = MotoGP weekend
