= Ducati 1198 =

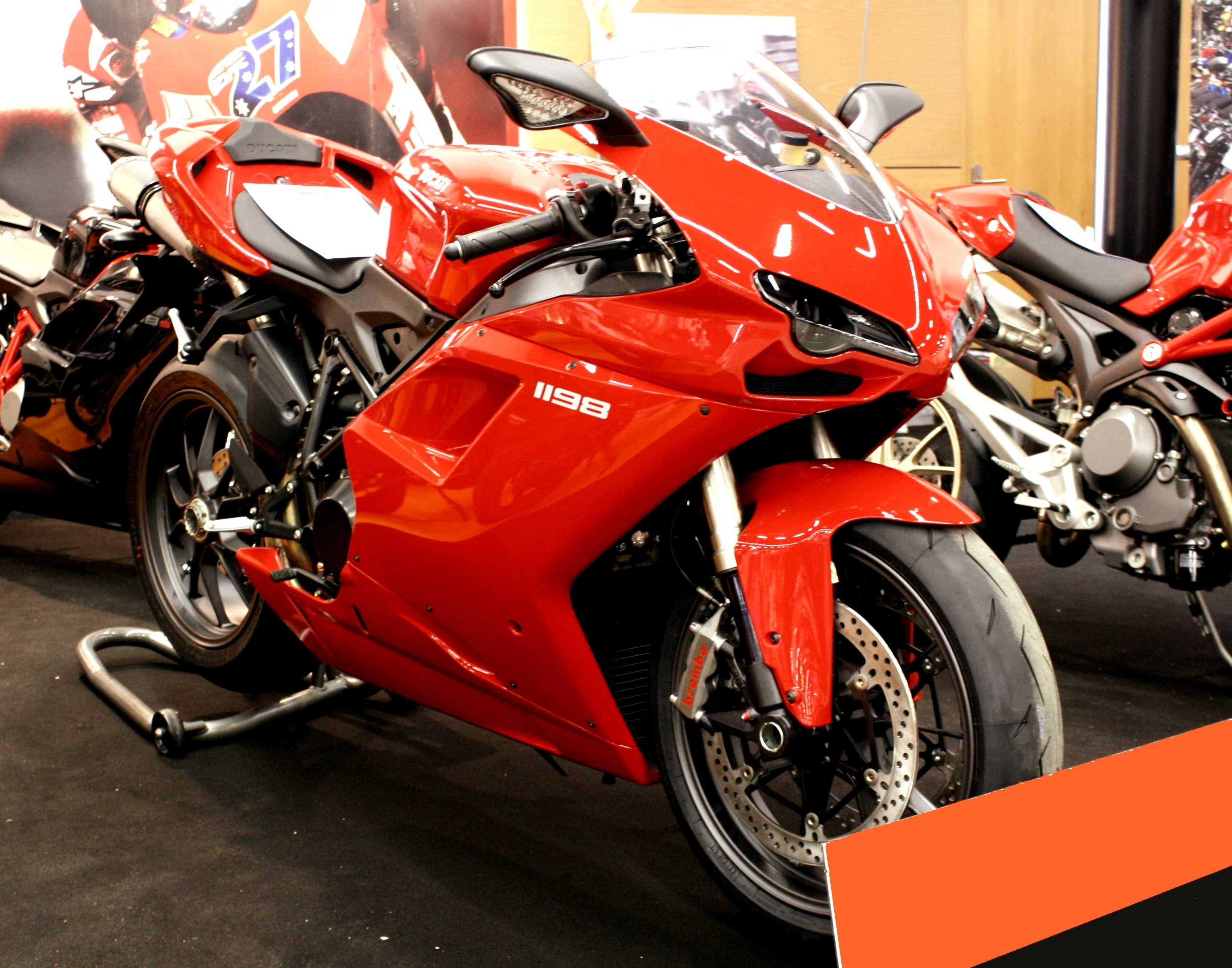
- Manufacturer: Ducati
- Production: 2009–2011
- Predecessor: Ducati 1098
- Successor: Ducati 1199
- Class: Sport bike
- Engine: 1,198 cc (73.1 cu in), 90° L-twin, liquid-cooled desmodromic 4-valve
- Bore / stroke: 106.0 mm × 67.9 mm (4.17 in × 2.67 in)
- Transmission: 6-speed constant-mesh sequential manual, dry multi-plate clutch
- Related: Ducati 848

The Ducati 1198 is a sport bike made by Ducati from 2009 to 2011. For the 2011 model year there were two models: the 1198 and 1198 SP (replacing the 1198S). The 1198 shared design elements with its predecessor 1098, but had more power and torque, redesigned wheels, lighter headlights, traction control, lighter fairings (on the S model), and a few minor paint changes. One carryover from its 998 heritage is the distinctive single-sided swingarm.

== Performance ==
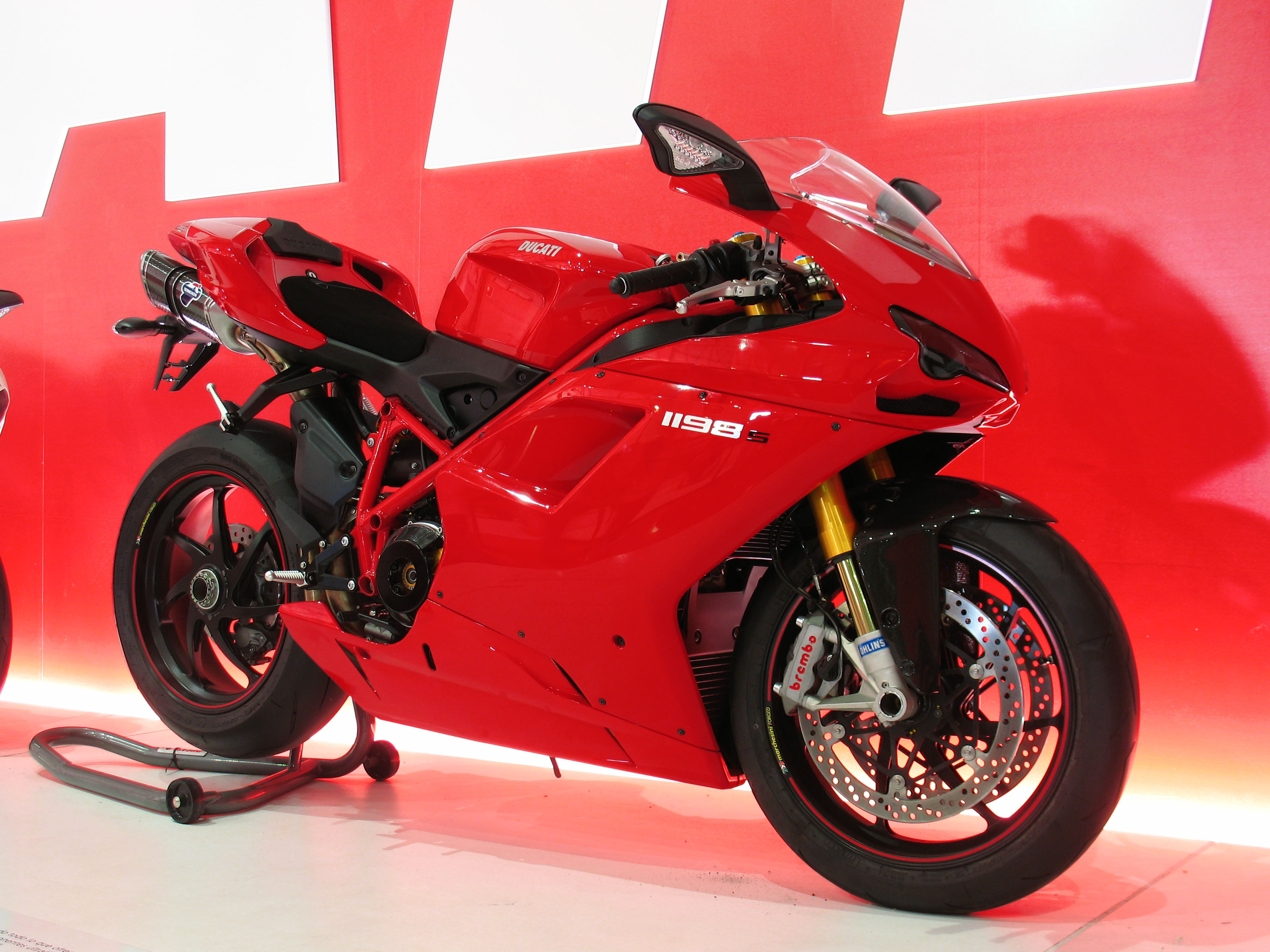
Ducati 1198 S

Ducati claim that the 1198/1198 SP makes 127kW (170hp), 132Nm (97 lbf ft) torque, and has a dry weight of 173 kg (381 lb). Rear-wheel output was tested as 117.75 kilowatts (157.91 hp) at 9,600 rpm and 122.21 Nm (90.14 lbf) torque at 8,300 rpm, with a wet weight of 200 kg (441 lb). The 1198 R makes a manufacturer-claimed 180 hp (134 kW) and 134.4 Nm (99.1 lbf) torque.

== Specifications ==
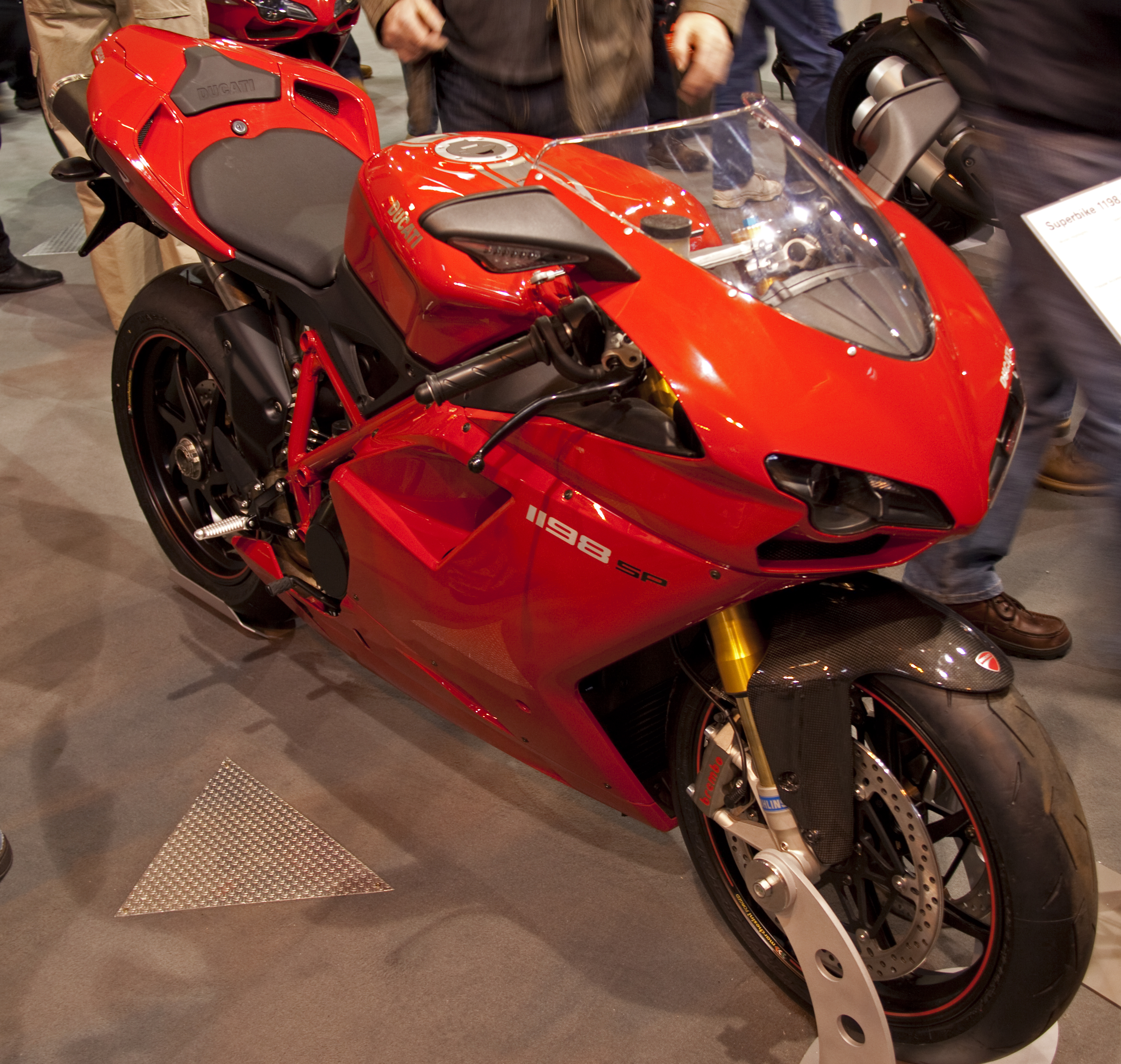
Ducati 1198 SP

All specifications are manufacturer claimed unless noted otherwise:

	1198	1198 S	1198 R
Chassis
Frame	Steel trellis frame, tubular ALS 450		
Wheelbase	1,430 mm (56.3 in)		
Rake	24.5°		
Front suspension	Showa 43 mm (1.7 in) with TiO fully adjustable upside-down fork	Öhlins 43 mm (1.7 in) fully adjustable upside-down fork with TiN	
Front wheel travel	127 mm (5.0 in)	120 mm (4.7 in)	
Front brake	2 x 330 mm (13.0 in) semi-floating discs, radially mounted Brembo Monobloc calipers 4-piston, 2-pad		
Front wheel	10-spoke Marchesini in light alloy 3.5 in × 17 in (89 mm × 432 mm)	7-spoke Marchesini in forged light alloy 3.5 in × 17 in (89 mm × 432 mm)	
Front tire	120/70 ZR17 (Pirelli Diablo Supercorsa SP tire)		
Rear suspension	Fully adjustable Showa monoshock, aluminum single-sided swingarm	Fully adjustable Öhlins monoshock, aluminum single-sided swingarm	Fully adjustable Öhlins TTXR monoshock, aluminum single-sided swingarm
Rear wheel travel	127 mm (5.0 in)		
Rear brake	245 mm (9.6 in) disc, 2-piston caliper		
Rear wheel	10-spoke Marchesini light alloy 6 in × 17 in (152 mm × 432 mm)	7-spoke Marchesini forged light alloy 6 in × 17 in (152 mm × 432 mm)	10-spoke forged Marchesini light alloy 6 in × 17 in (152 mm × 432 mm)
Rear tire	190/55 ZR17 (Pirelli Diablo Supercorsa SP tire)		
Fuel tank capacity	15.5 L (3.4 imperial gallons; 4.1 US gallons) (of which 4 L (0.9 imperial gallons; 1.1 US gallons) reserve)		
Dry weight	171 kg (377 lb)	169 kg (373 lb)	165 kg (364 lb)
Seat height	820 mm (32.3 in)		
Instruments	Digital LCD		
Versions	Dual seat		Single seat
Engine
Type	L-twin, 4 valve per cylinder Desmodromic, liquid-cooled		
Displacement	1,198.4 cc (73.1 cu in)		
Bore x Stroke	106.0 mm × 67.9 mm (4.17 in × 2.67 in)		
Compression Ratio	12.7:1		12.8:1
Power	126.8 kW (170.0 hp) @ 9,750 rpm (claimed); 117.75 kW (157.91 hp) @ 9,600 rpm (rear wheel)		134.2 kW (180.0 hp) @ 9,750 rpm (claimed)
Torque	123 Nm (97 lbf ft) @ 8,000 rpm (claimed); 123 Nm (90 lbf ft) @ 8,300 rpm (rear wheel)		134.4 Nm (99 lbf ft) @ 7,750 rpm (claimed)
Fuel injection	Marelli electronic fuel injection, elliptical throttle bodies.		
Exhaust	Twin stainless steel exhaust with catalytic converter and lambda probe		Twin stainless steel/titanium exhaust with catalytic converter and 2 lambda probes
Emissions	Euro 3		
Transmission
Gearbox	6-speed		
Ratios	1st 37/15; 2nd 30/17; 3rd 27/20; 4th 24/22; 5th 23/24; 6th 22/25		
Primary drive	Straight-cut gears, Ratio 1.84:1		
Final drive	Chain; Front sprocket 15; Rear sprocket 38		
Clutch	Multiplate dry clutch, hydraulic		Multiplate dry slipper clutch, hydraulic (1198 SP also slipper)

== Motorsport ==
Carlos Checa won both the riders and manufacturers title during the 2011 Superbike World Championship season.
