= AMA Pro Daytona Sportbike Championship =

The AMA Pro Daytona Sportbike Championship was a motorcycle racing series run by AMA Pro Racing. The category was similar to the Formula Xtreme class, allowing a wide range of engine types and displacements.

The flagship race for the series was the Daytona 200, held at the Daytona International Speedway.

== Champions ==
Season	Rider	Manufacturer
2009	(United States) Danny Eslick (Buell)	(Japan) Yamaha
2010	(Colombia) Martín Cárdenas (Suzuki)	(Japan) Suzuki
2011	(United States) Danny Eslick (Suzuki)	(Japan) Yamaha
2012	(Colombia) Martín Cárdenas (Suzuki)	(Japan) Suzuki
2013	(United States) Cameron Beaubier (Yamaha)	(Japan) Yamaha
2014	(United States) Jacob Gagne (Yamaha)	(Japan) Yamaha

== See also ==
- AMA Superbike Championship
- AMA Supersport Championship
