= Chip Yates =

American inventor

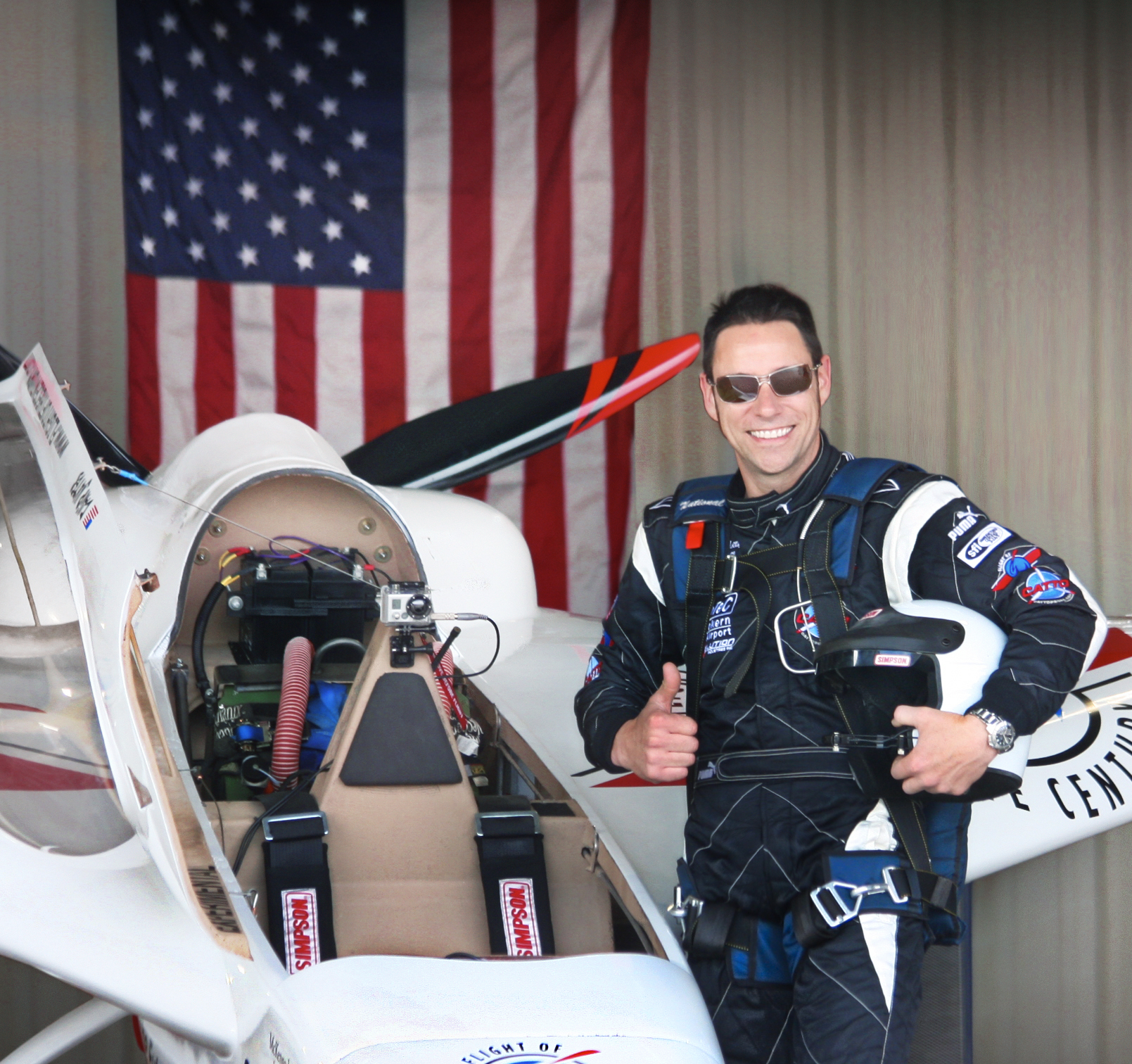
- Born: William Morrison Yates III; 11 February 1971 (age 55); Portsmouth, Virginia
- Occupations: Inventor and Entrepreneur
- Years active: 1998–present

Chip Yates (born February 11, 1971, as William Morrison Yates III) is an American inventor and electrical vehicle pioneer best known for risky record-setting feats in electric vehicles of his own design. He designed and built the record-breaking SWIGZ electric motorcycle, which in 2011 he rode over 200 mph (322 km/h) to 8 official world land speed records, 4 AMA National Championship Records, the Pikes Peak International Hill Climb record, and the Guinness Book of World Records title of “World’s Fastest Electric Motorcycle”. Dubbed "the world’s most powerful electric superbike", the motorcycle is now on display at the Petersen Automotive Museum's exhibit 'Electric Revolution', curated by Paul d'Orleans.

Yates' stated mission is "to prove that electric vehicles don't have to be slow and boring", and to follow this pursuit Yates next designed and built an all-electric airplane based on a modified Burt Rutan Long-EZ in which he has set five official Fédération Aéronautique Internationale (FAI) world records and two Guinness World Records. Dubbed “the world’s most powerful electric airplane” and renamed “Long-ESA” for Yates’ “Electric Speed and Altitude” world record campaign, the composite aircraft has been modified with a front-mounted recharging probe and ballistic parachute for an attempt Yates has announced he will make a mid-air recharging the on-board battery pack from another aircraft flying in close formation.

Yates' exploits, in more ways than one, in pushing electric vehicle technology earned recognition as a "Pioneer of Aviation" from the State of California in the form of Assembly Resolution #1740, presented to Yates in Sacramento during Senate and Assembly sessions on August 30, 2012 He is also a noted public speaker, having presented several television shows and served as the first national spokesman for the Conrad Foundation, and has delivered a TEDx talk on his philosophy of innovation and risk.

== Early life and career ==
Born in Portsmouth Virginia, Yates spent his early years in Pittsburgh, Pennsylvania, where he displayed an early interest in mechanics. By the time he was thirteen years old he could disassemble and reassemble complete motorcycles. At age fourteen, Yates was sent to Culver Military Academy, a co-ed boarding school in Indiana where he received his high school education. He went on to receive a master's degree in Business Entrepreneurship from the University of Southern California where he was later hired as an adjunct faculty. In 1997, Yates replaced automotive designer Chip Foose at ASHA Corporation where he invented and patented a series of hydraulic control valves for the 1999 Jeep Grand Cherokee. He also launched a start-up company called "SWIGZ®" to market his patented dual-chambered fitness bottle concept.

=== Internal combustion racing career ===
From 1999 to 2002, Yates competed in the SCCA Club Rally and Pro-Rally Series driving a 1989 Toyota MR2 that he built with a 1.6 liter supercharged engine. In 2001, Yates won the SCCA Southern Pacific (SOPAC) Group 5 (2-wheel drive class) Rally Championship. In January 2007, at age 36, Yates entered a beginner's motorcycle track riding course at Auto Club Speedway near Los Angeles, California. He became drawn to motorcycle racing, earning enough points during the 2007-2008 amateur roadracing seasons to turn professional within nineteen months of his first track experience. In 2009, Yates competed in the AMA Pro Daytona SportBike class in televised professional races at Auto Club Speedway, Infineon Raceway, Laguna Seca, and Heartland Park, before his season ended prematurely with a broken pelvis sustained in a high-speed racing crash during AMA competition.

Yates also raced gasoline-powered motorcycles at the world level through his wild-card invitation and entry in the Fédération Internationale de Motocyclisme (FIM) World Superbike Championship round in 2009 at Miller Motorsports Park near Salt Lake City, Utah, where he was the only American to qualify and finish the 2009 World Supersport Race.

=== Electric motorcycle racing career ===
While unable to race due to his broken pelvis, Yates recruited two volunteer aerospace engineers, Ben Ingram and Robert Ussery, to develop an electric racing motorcycle capable of meeting his goal of equaling gasoline-powered motorcycle laptimes. Yates announced plans to ride the hand-built prototype in the newly formed TTXGP and FIM e-Power electric motorcycle race series. To accomplish gasoline performance parity, Yates and his team developed and filed patents on several new electric vehicle technologies including a kinetic energy recovery system ("KERS") designed to capture braking energy from the front wheel of the motorcycle. The first KERS patent "8,761,984 Front Wheel Energy Recovery System" issued on June 24, 2014, with two more KERS patents still pending (12/897,534 and 14/305,534). The team also created technology to ensure an electric vehicle reaches its intended destination as pending patent "13/538,107 Vehicle Control Systems and Methods."

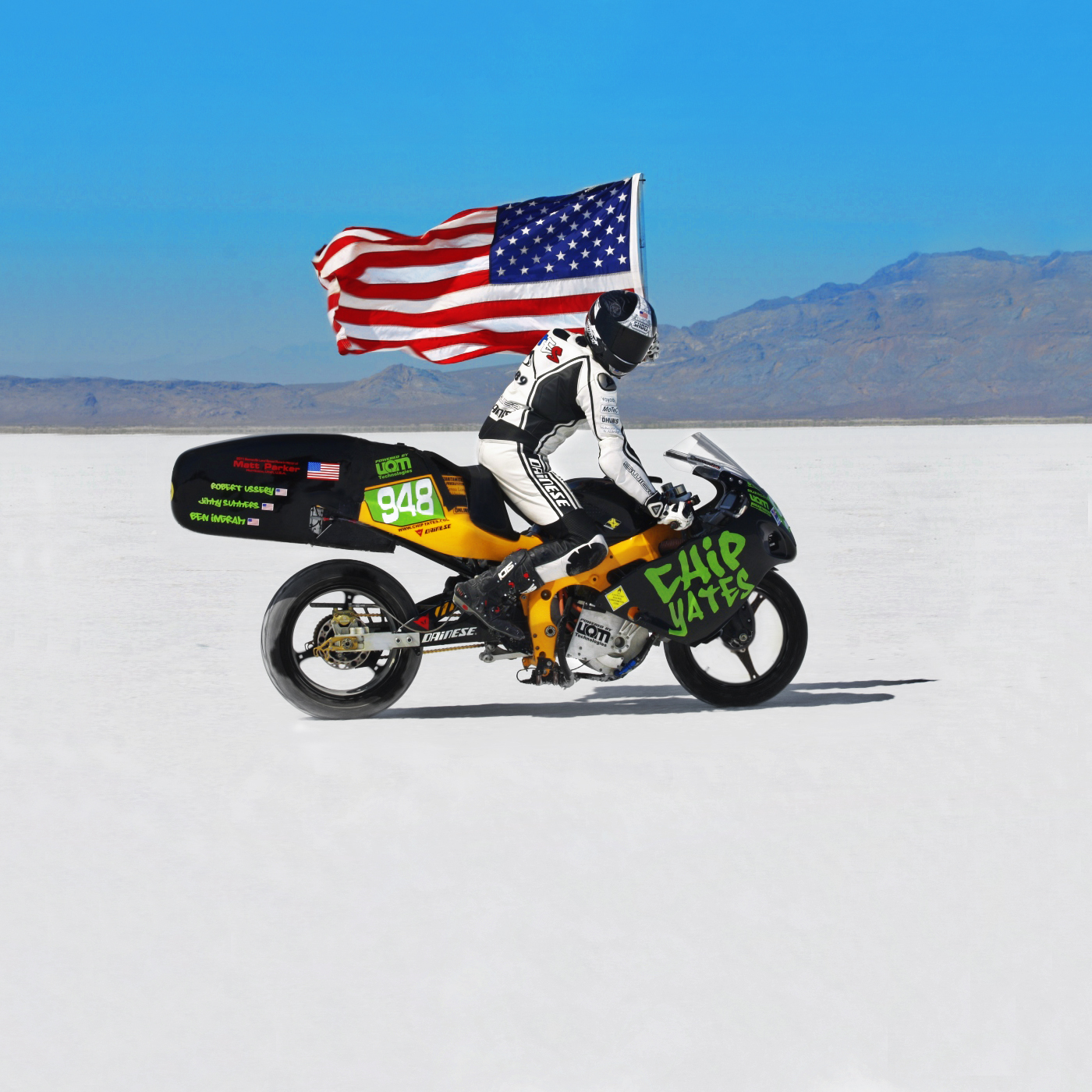
Yates and the electric motorcycle at Bonneville

Although the electric motorcycle was completed in time to race the 2011 electric motorcycle schedule, the TTXGP and FIM e-Power series both adopted a new-for-2011 maximum weight rule that effectively excluded Yates’ motorcycle from competition based on a lower maximum allowable weight. In response, Yates entered his electric motorcycle in a WERA (Western Eastern Roadracing Association) gasoline road race event on January 9, 2011, at Auto Club Speedway in both the Heavyweight Twins Superbike (HWTSB) class, and the Heavyweight Twins Superstock (HWTSS) class. Due to the unproven nature of the electric motorcycle, Yates was required to start both races from the back of the grid. During the races, Yates rode past numerous gasoline-powered superbikes to finish second place in HWTSS, and third place in HWTSB with a top speed on the straightaway of 158 MPH. The act of beating gasoline motorcycles with a self-built electric motorcycle to two podium results was hailed by some members of the motorcycle and mainstream media as historically significant.

In February, 2011, Yates returned to Auto Club Speedway and announced his intention to set a professional level laptime fast enough to qualify the electric prototype motorcycle for an AMA Pro Daytona SportBike series event despite its claimed 585 pound curb weight. Yates’ best laptime from the gas versus electric race the month prior was 1:39.0, which would require a 3.12 second improvement to get down to an AMA qualifying laptime of 1:35.88. Yates was unable to close the gap, ending the test effort with a best laptime of 1:37.308 and top speed on the straightaway of 163.7 MPH, an improvement of 1.692 seconds over his previous best time, but still 1.428 seconds short of his AMA goal.

After the Auto Club Speedway gasoline versus electric race and AMA gasoline superbike laptime attempts, Yates entered the electric motorcycle in the Mojave Mile Shootout competition on April 10, 2011, setting an unofficial land speed world record of 190.6 MPH. He then entered the 89th running of the Pikes Peak International Hill Climb on June 26, 2011, setting the record for the most powerful motorcycle (240 horsepower) of any kind to enter the race in its 89-year history, and setting the official outright record for the fastest electric motorcycle to complete the hill climb, beating the previous record holder's time by over four minutes.

The final act of Yates’ electric superbike campaign took place at the Bonneville Salt Flats in the Utah desert at the BUB FIM / AMA Speed Trials August 27-September 1, 2011. During the event, Yates and his team overcame a broken chain, high speed instability and a 150 MPH crash into a mile marker signpost to set eight official FIM World Landspeed Records, four AMA National Championship Records, and the Guinness World Records title of "World’s Fastest Electric Motorcycle".

=== Electric aircraft records ===
Following his retirement of the electric superbike to the Peterson Automotive Museum, Yates leveraged the technology developed for the electric superbike to design his Long-ESA electric airplane. In July 2012 he piloted this aircraft over 200 mph making it the world's fastest electric airplane in a flight that ended with an emergency dead-stick landing following an in-flight lithium-ion battery problem. shows Yates barely making the runway at Inyokern Airport after the flight.

Yates received his private pilot's license on July 12, 2012, after two months of training and just days before the record-breaking electric flight on July 18, 2012. The construction of the electric plane, earning of pilot's license and record flight all occurred within twelve months of Yates setting the electric motorcycle world records at Bonneville in July, 2011. The week following the record flight, the Long-ESA aircraft was displayed at the 2012 EAA AirVenture Oshkosh (Wisconsin), where Yates revealed the previously unseen cockpit video and telemetry from the aircraft in a presentation for the Charles and Anne Morrow Lindbergh Foundation.

In August 2013 Yates attempted to set five Fédération Aéronautique Internationale (FAI) world records in an effort that was stymied by electrical problems that led to an emergency deadstick landing. The troubled flight was documented in a video in which chase pilot Zach Reeder flying an experimental Van's Aircraft RV-8 redirects Yates away from landing on a public road and safely back to runway 10 at Inyokern Airport in California. In September 2013 Yates successfully set three official FAI World Records: (i) "Time to Climb to a Height of 3,000 Meters" in a record-setting time of 6 minutes 28 seconds, (ii) "Altitude in Horizontal Flight" with a record-setting sustained altitude of 4,439 Meters (14,564 feet), (iii) "Altitude" with a record-setting altitude of 4,481 Meters (14,701 feet). In November 2013 Yates successfully set three more official FAI World Records: (i) “Time to Climb to a Height of 3,000 Meters" in a record-setting time of 5 minutes 32 seconds, (ii) “Speed Over a 3 km Course” with a 4 pass average speed of 201 mph, (iii) “Speed over a 15 km Course” with a 2 pass average speed of 140 mph. Yates’ Time to Climb World Record performance of 5 minutes 32 seconds demonstrated a sustained rate of climb of 2,000 feet per minute from ground level to 9,843 feet above the ground (3,000 meters), which is greater performance than most gasoline powered airplanes and was selected by the National Aeronautic Association (NAA) as the “Most Memorable Aviation Record of 2013.”

On October 5, 2013, Yates set a Guinness World Record with his electric airplane at the California Capital Airshow in Sacramento, California for "Time to Climb to 500 Meters" with a performance of 1:02.58 measured from wheels stopped until the aircraft reaches the required altitude. On October 6, 2013, Yates set a second Guinness World Record for "Fastest Electric Airplane" with a run in one direction of the 1 kilometer course of 220.9 mph and the opposite direction run of 212.9 mph averaging 216.9 mph.

=== Flight of the century ===
On May 22, 2012, Yates announced plans to build a 100-foot wingspan custom electric airplane that he intends to fly along Charles Lindbergh's 3,600 mile transatlantic route. Using a patent-pending mid-air recharging concept, the aircraft will receive battery recharges from a series of five unmanned recharging aircraft en route with the goal of matching or exceeding Lindbergh's average speed. This effort has been branded Flight of the Century.

== Public appearances ==
Yates has been featured on a number of television shows, including in interviews with NBC's morning show Today in the Bay, PBS's feature series Real Orange, and he recently hosted a Discovery Channel aviation show on the Spruce Goose, for Discovery's "World’s Top Five" series. On September 3, 2013, Yates' world record attempts and electric airplane transatlantic plans were featured by Discovery Channel on their Daily Planet Series.

On November 14, 2012, Yates was interviewed by the Experimental Aircraft Association ("EAA") for their historical preservation video series entitled Timeless Voices of Aviation. According to the EAA, "The objective of Timeless Voices of Aviation, a major video history project of the EAA AirVenture Museum, is to assure that the first person oral histories of aviation's development are preserved for future generations of family members, teachers, students, historians and others."

Yates has been featured by Wired.com numerous times leading to their in-depth profile on June 25, 2013, in their series "Living the Wired Life" where Charles Lindbergh's grandson Erik Lindbergh was interviewed and said, "Without some risk-takers we just don’t make progress that fast, so I really applaud him for his willingness to risk. On the other hand, I hope he stays alive."

=== Conrad Foundation ===
On October 3, 2013, Yates was named as the first ever Official National Spokesman for the Conrad Foundation's Spirit of Innovation Challenge, which celebrates the life and entrepreneurial spirit of astronaut Pete Conrad, the third man to walk on the Moon. The program challenges students ages 13 – 18 to use science, technology, engineering and math skills along with creativity, collaboration and entrepreneurship to develop products and services to benefit humanity and address global sustainability. Nancy Conrad, widow of Astronaut Pete Conrad and the founder and chairman of the Conrad Foundation said, "It was Pete’s personal drive and entrepreneurial spirit that propelled him to embrace innovation to achieve his goals, walk on the moon and leave a legacy we are so proud to honor. Pete would have admired Chip’s tireless pursuit of innovative design."

Yates has delivered numerous keynote speeches at NASA Ames and Space Center Houston that are streamed live to students and teachers around the world to launch the Conrad Foundation's Annual Spirit of Innovation Challenge.

=== TEDx talk ===
On October 19, 2013, Yates delivered a TED Talk at the TEDx Bermuda event entitled "Risk Is The Currency of Innovation", where he opened with a video showing examples of risk, failure and innovation. During the talk he was quoted as saying "The reason I take these risks is because I have a dream where everyone will one day fly in an electric airplane."

=== Maker Faire ===
On May 17, 2014, Yates delivered a speech entitled "Make | Ride | Fly: 200 MPH in 2 Homemade EVs" on the main stage at Maker Faire Bay Area, where he opened his presentation by hanging from a harness in a metal frame over the audience to demonstrate a simulation of parachuting out of his electric airplane during one of his three emergency landings.

=== Rockstar of Science ===
On April 26, 2014, Yates launched a website at www.rockstarofscience.com “to help inspire kids to dream big and do great things.” The site is used to schedule Chip's speaking calendar for schools and other events aimed at promoting science and innovation to kids.

=== The Hoodlum Diaries ===
On July 11, 2014, Yates announced that he would take three months off from electric vehicle technology and setting world records to write a book aimed at showing kids how to overcome adversity in pursuit of their dreams. The working title is "The Hoodlum Diaries", a nod to the frequent trouble Yates encountered as a frustrated high-energy kid before and throughout military high school.

== Electric motorcycle records and performance ==
Fédération Internationale de Motocyclisme (FIM) World Records
World Record#	Bonneville Course Length	Average Speed (mi/hr)	Average Speed (km/h)	FIM Class and Weight
1	Flying Mile	196.420	316.107	Group A1 (solo motorcycles) Division B (partially streamlined)
2	Flying Kilometer	196.912	316.899	Type VII (electric), Class 3 (over 300 kg)
3	Flying Mile	181.437	291.995	Group A1 (solo motorcycles) Division A (non-streamlined)
4	Flying Kilometer	181.608	292.270	Type VII (electric), Class 3 (over 300 kg)
5	Flying Mile	173.404	279.067	Group A1 (solo motorcycles) Division A (non-streamlined)
6	Flying Kilometer	174.543	280.900	Type VII (electric), Class 2 (150–300 kg)
7	Flying Mile	187.126	301.150	Group A1 (solo motorcycles) Division B (partially streamlined)
8	Flying Kilometer	186.982	300.773	Type VII (electric), Class 2 (100–300 kg)

AMA National Championship - National Records
Record#	Class	Average Speed (mi/hr)
1	300 kg-A-W	173.574
2	Unlimited-A-W	181.439
3	Unlimited-APS-W	196.42
4	300 kg-APS-W	187.142

Guinness Book of World Records
World's Fastest Electric Motorcycle	196.912 mph	316.889 km/h

Pikes Peak International Hill Climb
2011 Record Finishing Time (Electric Motorcycles)	12:50.094 minutes

AutoClub Speedway Lap Time
Best Lap Time	1:37:308 minutes

Mojave Mile Shootout
2011 Best Speed (standing start)	190.6 mph

== Electric aircraft records ==
Fédération Aéronautique Internationale (FAI) and National Aeronautic Association (NAA) World Records
World Record#	Sub-class	Type of Record	Performance	Date	Record ID
1	C-1b	Altitude	4481 m (14701 ft)	09/06/2013	16926
	C-1b	Time to climb to 3000m	6min 28sec	09/06/2013	16928
2	C-1b	Speed over 3 km course	324.04 km/h (201 mph)	11/23/2013	16977
3	C-1b	Time to climb to 3000m	5min 32sec	11/24/2013	16983
4	C-1b	Altitude in horizontal flight	4439 m (14564 ft)	09/06/2013	16927
5	C-1b	Speed over a 15 km course	225.88 km/h (140 mph)	11/24/2013	16978
