= Ducati 848 =

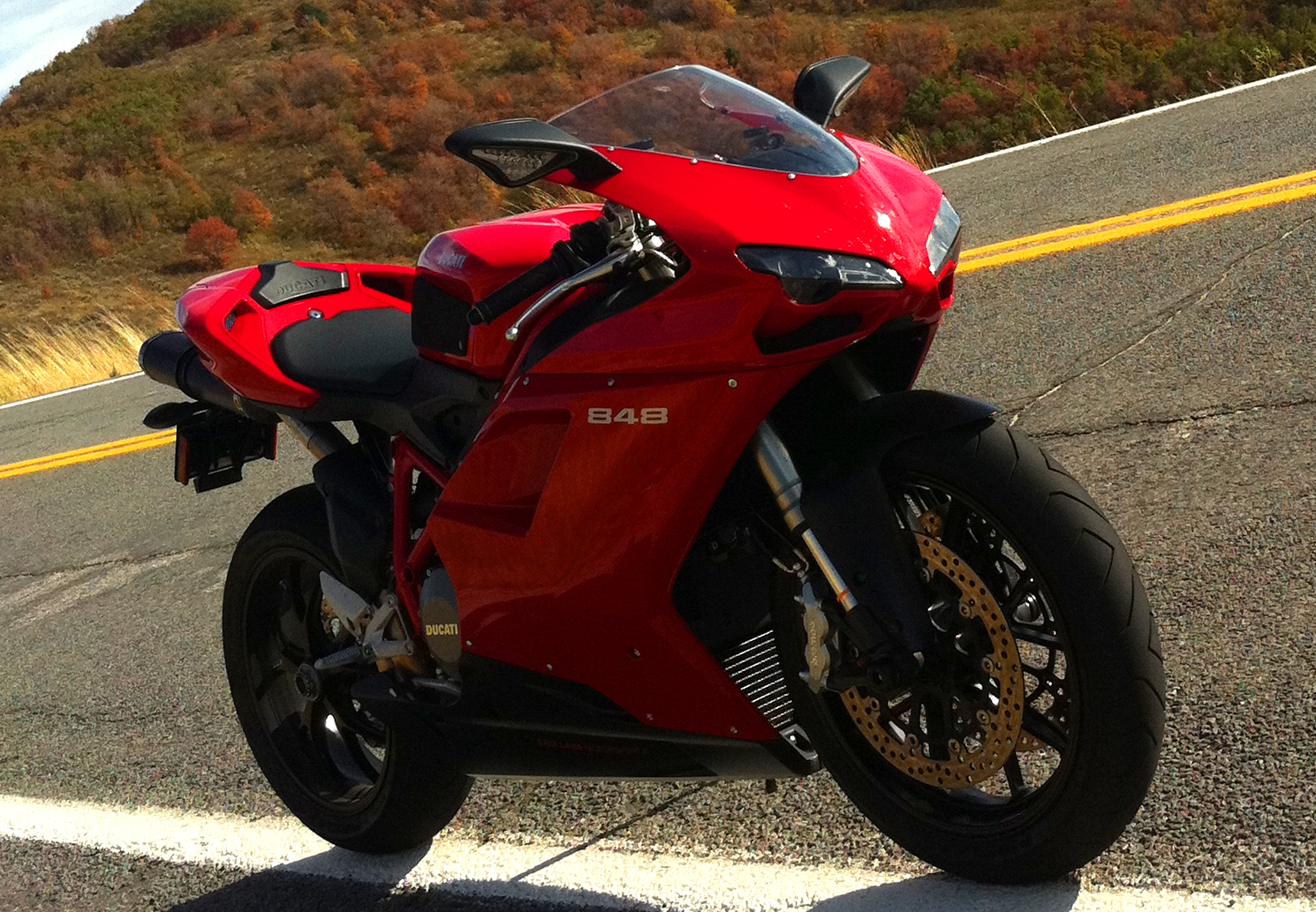
- Manufacturer: Ducati
- Production: 2008–2013
- Predecessor: Ducati 749
- Successor: Ducati 899
- Class: Sport bike
- Engine: 849 cc (51.8 cu in), 4-valves/cyl. desmodromic liquid cooled 90° L-twin
- Bore / stroke: 94 mm × 61.2 mm (3.70 in × 2.41 in)
- Compression ratio: 12:1
- Top speed: 290 km/h (180 mph)
- Power: 92 kW (125 PS; 123 hp) @ 10,000 rpm (848 first gen.); 103 kW (140 PS; 138 hp) @ 10,500 rpm (848EVO and 848 EVO Corse SE)
- Torque: 90 N⋅m (66 lbf⋅ft) @ 8,240 rpm (claimed) (848 first gen.); 98 N⋅m (72 lbf⋅ft) @ 9,750 rpm (claimed) (848EVO and 848 EVO Corse SE)
- Transmission: 6-speed, wet clutch
- Suspension: Front: Showa fully adjustable upside-down forks, 127 mm (5.0 in) travel Rear: Showa fully adjustable monoshock, 120 mm (4.7 in) travel
- Brakes: Front: 2×320 mm semi-floating discs, radial Brembo 4-piston calipers Rear: 245 mm disc, 2-piston caliper
- Tires: Front: 120/70 ZR17; Rear: 180/55 ZR17
- Rake, trail: 24.5°, 97 mm (3.8 in)
- Wheelbase: 1,430 mm (56 in)
- Dimensions: L: 2,100 mm (83 in); H: 1,100 mm (43 in)
- Seat height: 830 mm (33 in)
- Weight: 168 kg (370 lb) (claimed) (dry)
- Fuel capacity: 15.5 L (3.4 imp gal; 4.1 US gal) incl 4.1 L (0.90 imp gal; 1.1 US gal) reserve
- Fuel consumption: 5.3 L/100 km; 53 mpg_{‑imp} (44 mpg_{‑US})
- Related: Ducati 1198

The Ducati 848 is a sport bike with a 849 cc (51.8 cu in) 90° L-twin engine made by Ducati. It was announced on November 6, 2007, for the 2008 model year, replacing the 749. The 848 and the 1098 are the same design by Giandrea Fabbro, both use the same frame and bodywork. The first generation 848 makes a claimed 92 kW (125 PS; 123 hp) 10,000 rpm and 90 N⋅m (66 lbf⋅ft) torque at 8,240 rpm. With a manufacturer claimed dry weight of 168 kg (370 lb), the 848 is 5 kg (11 lb) lighter than its larger displacement sibling, the 1198. The first generation 848 covered model years 2008, 2009 and 2010. In July 2009 the 848 Hayden Limited Edition was introduced as a 2010 model as a marketing tie-in with world champion Nicky Hayden racing for Ducati starting from the 2009 Moto GP season.

In August 2010, Ducati announced the 848 Evo, as the evolution of the model. The bike had small revisions such as mono-block Brembo brake calipers, a steering damper, and some engine improvements to increase power and torque to 103 kW (140 PS; 138 hp) at 10,500 rpm and 98 N⋅m (72 lbf⋅ft) torque at 9,750 rpm.

For the last model years 2012 and 2013, the 848 EVO Corse Special Edition was sold as a premium version next to the standard 848 EVO. The 2012 model 848 EVO Corse Special Edition had the Corse color scheme, upgraded 330 mm front brakes, adjustable Öhlins suspension, Ducati Quick Shift (DQS), Ducati Data Analyser (DDA), and adjustable Ducati Traction Control (DTC). The 2013 model year of the Corse Special Edition has an aluminium fuel tank reducing dry weight to 167 kg (368 lb) and adding 2.5 L (0.55 imp gal; 0.66 US gal) capacity. All 848 EVO Corse Special Editions had a claimed 103 kW (140 PS; 138 hp) at 10,500 rpm and 98 N⋅m (72 lbf⋅ft) torque at 9,7500 rpm.

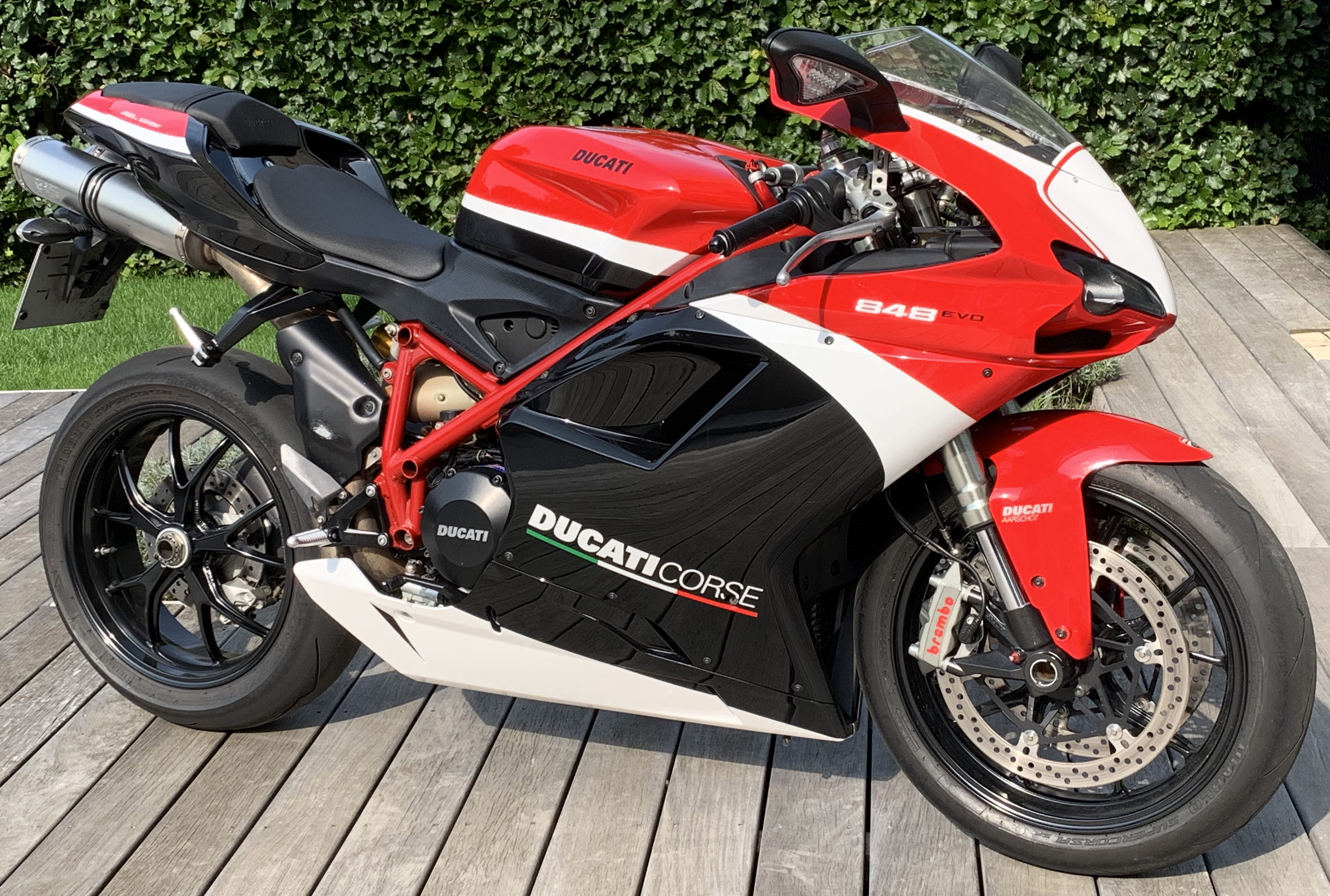
848 EVO Corse Special Edition 2012 model year

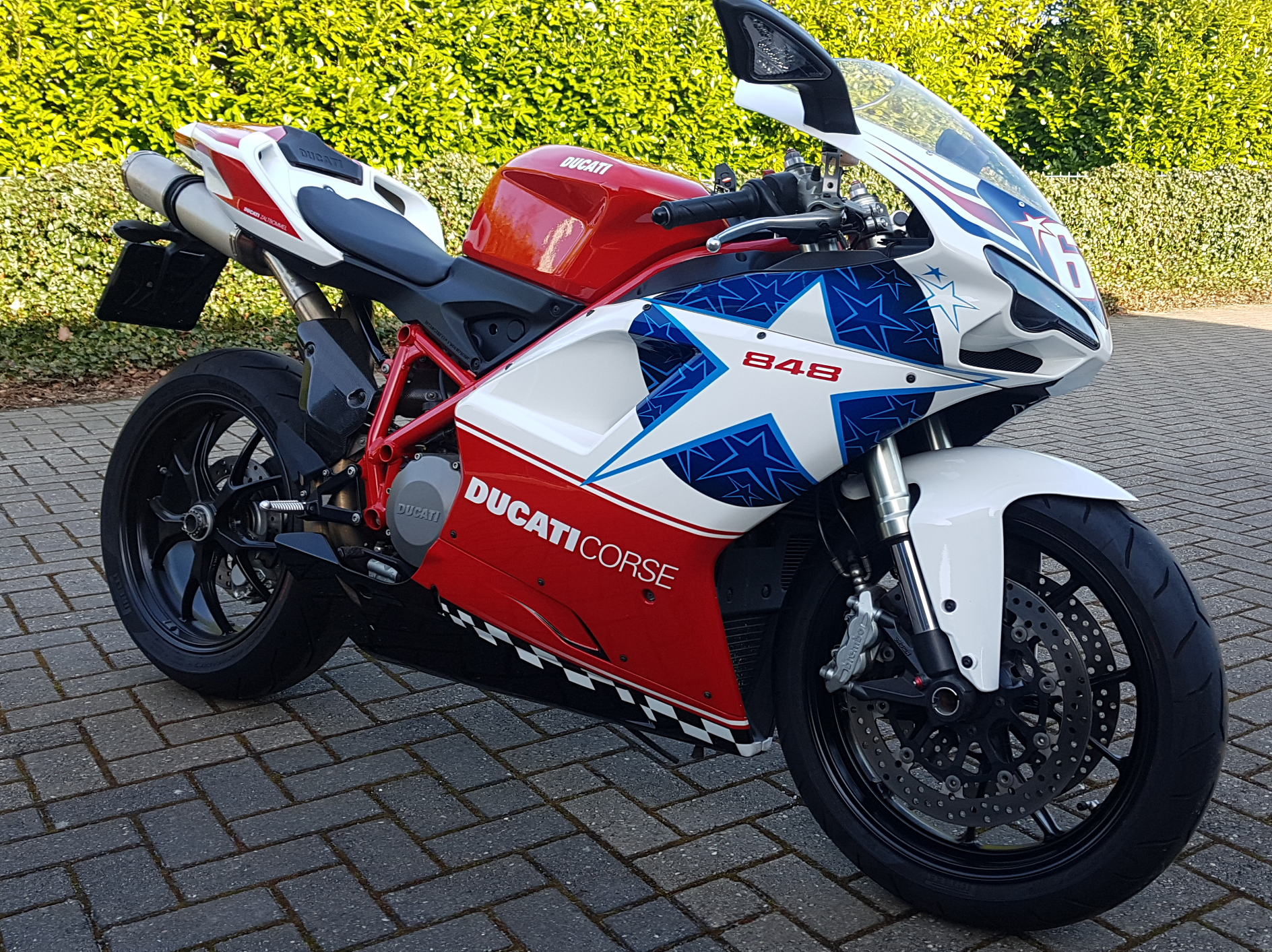
Ducati 848 Hayden Limited Edition

In 2013, Ducati announced the 848 would be replaced by the 899 Panigale.

== Changes from predecessor ==
=== Trellis frame ===
Developed in cooperation with Ducati Corse, the 848 trellis frame uses a simplified tube layout from the Ducati 749 with main section tubes that are enlarged in diameter from 28 mm to 34 mm, while being reduced in thickness from 2 mm to 1.5 mm. Ducati says this results in a 14% increase in rigidity and a weight savings of 1.5 kg (3.3 lb), helping the 848 weigh a claimed 20 kg (44 lb) less than the 749.

=== Engine revision ===
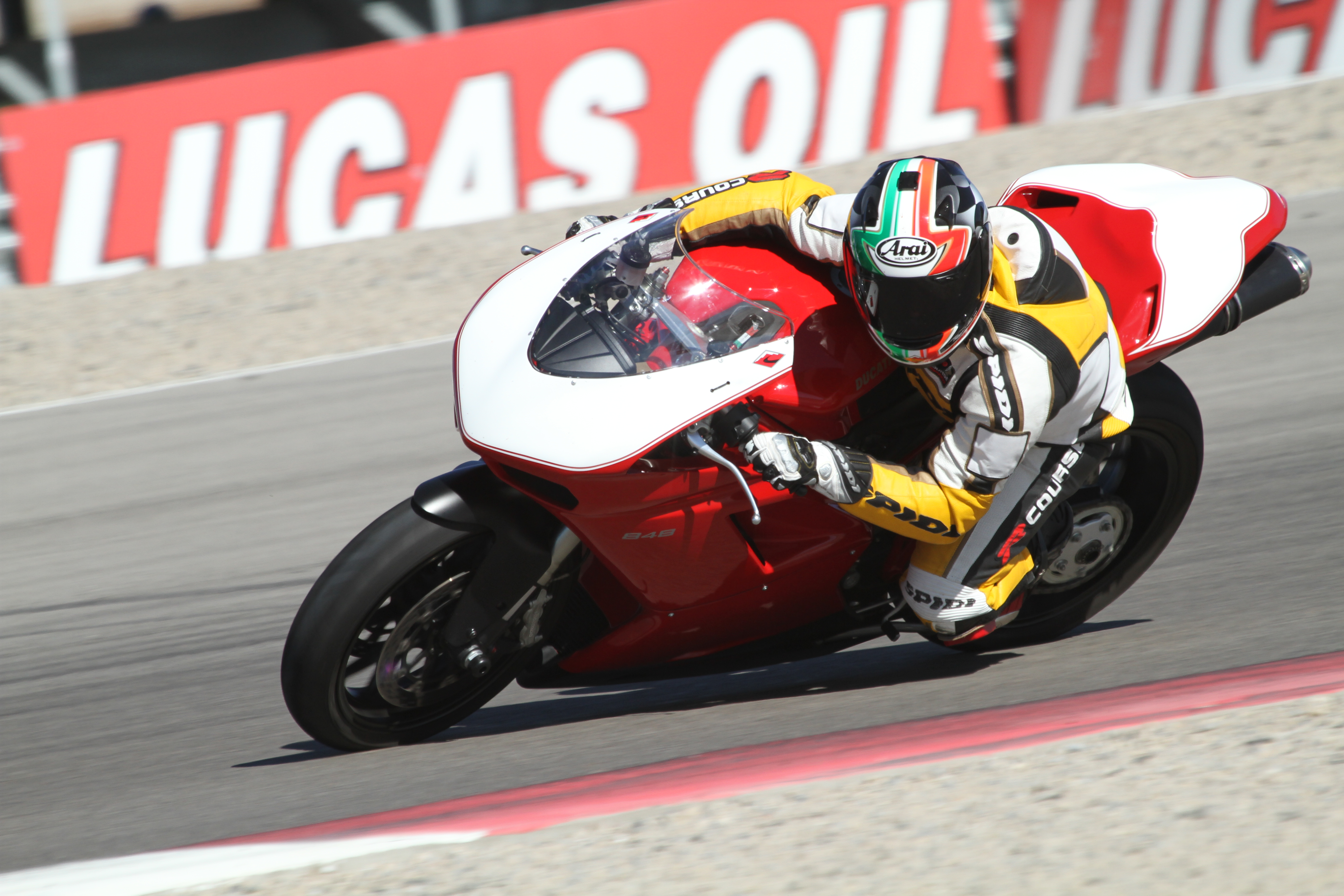
Race-Prepped Ducati 848 at Miller Motorsports Park

While most of the chassis components are identical to the 1098/1198, the motor was an all new design in 2008. Producing roughly 87 kW (116 hp) at the rear wheel. The "Testastretta Evoluzione" uses a 94 x 61.2 mm bore and stroke for 849 cc of displacement despite the bike's moniker of 848. The motor casings were constructed using a new vacuum die-casting method called Vacural that helps the engine weigh 7 lb (3.2 kg) less than the Ducati 749. The intake valves were increased 2.5 mm from the Ducati 749 numbers to 39.5 mm. The exhaust valves were enlarged 1.5 mm to 32 mm. The valve angles are identical to the Ducati 1098. The bike uses a pair of elliptical 56 mm throttle bodies fashioned after MotoGP designs.

The 2011 Ducati 848 Evo had several changes to the engine, including new Marelli throttle bodies, revised cylinder heads with straighter intake ports and reshaped combustion chambers. Ducati claimed these changes would result in an 11 kW (15 hp) increase, bringing output to 103 kW (140 PS; 138 hp) (95/1/EC). Cycle World magazine's first dynamometer test of the engine showed a 1.2 kW (1.6 hp) increase over the previous motor. Noteworthy EVO engine changes are the increased compression ratio from 12:1 on the first generation 848 to 13.2:1 on the EVO's with the rpm red-line moving from 10,800 rpm to 11,300 rpm on the EVO.

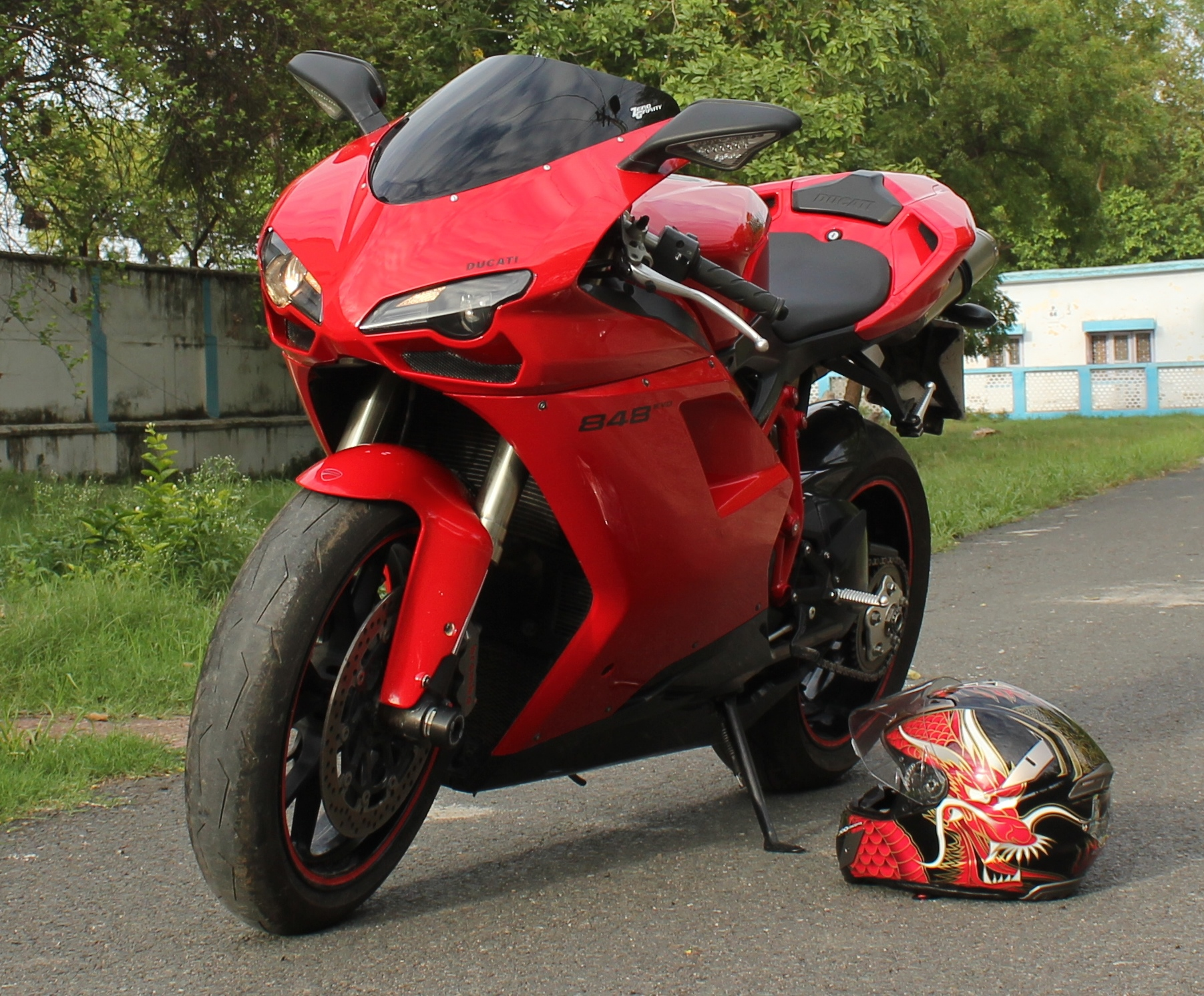
Ducati 848 EVO

=== Wet clutch ===
Although the 1198 and 848 share many similar components, as per the 916/748 and 999/749 models, the 848 uses a wet clutch rather than the traditional dry clutch of previous superbikes from Ducati. The manufacturer claims it reduces weight, improves both service life and "feel" of the clutch and reduces noise. Ducati has in the past held to only dry clutches in accordance with marketing their bikes as obeying the design imperatives of racing above all, unlike, as Ducati would have it, ordinary street bikes. While a dry clutch "rattles like a bucket of rocks," Ducati and its adherents felt the clutch's "typical noise is music to bikers' ears." The 848's wet clutch is a stark departure from this, because, "Ducati made it very clear that there is a new philosophy within the factory to develop each bike with specifications and capabilities that are aligned with the bike's target audience and intended environment."

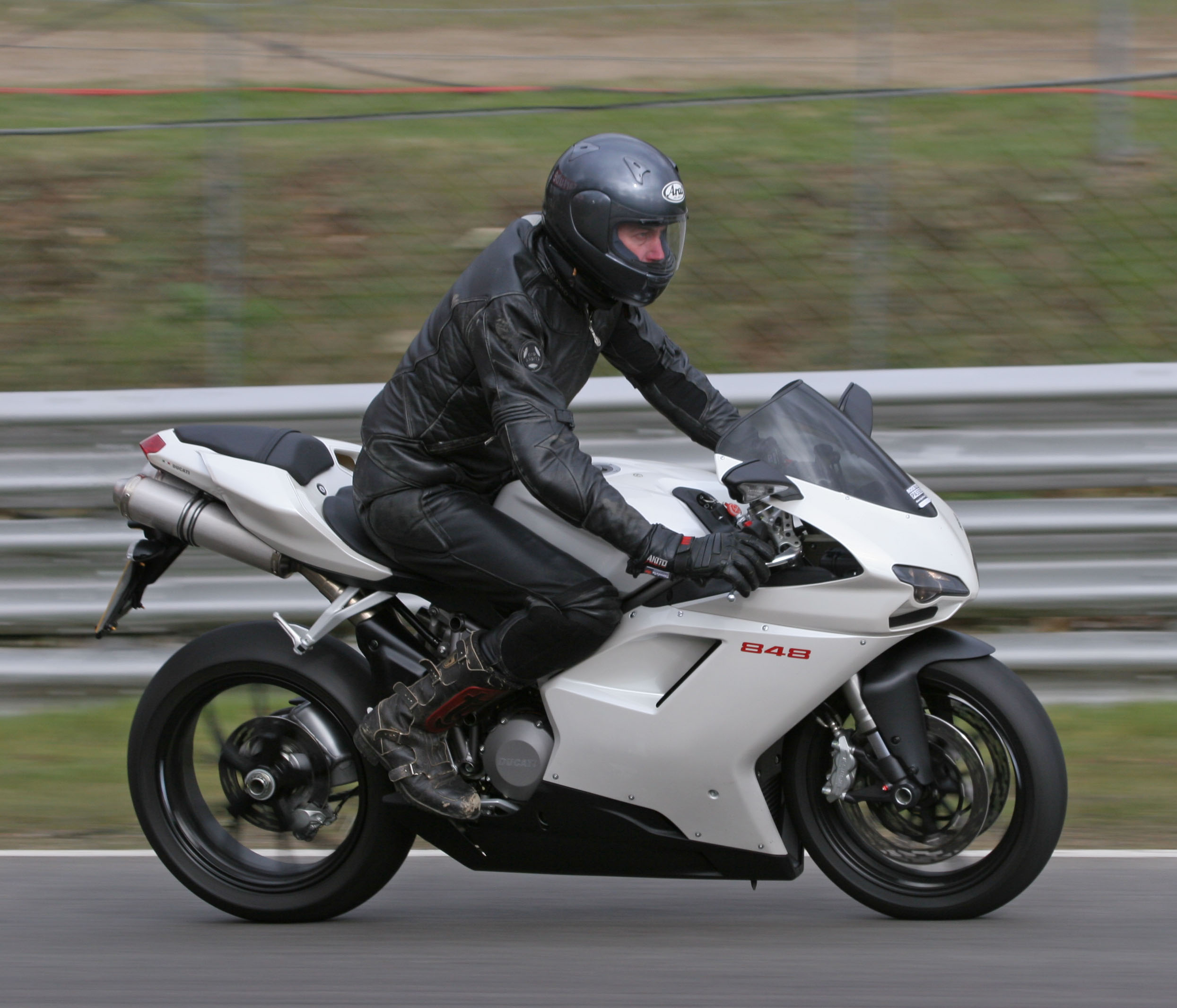
Ducati 848

== Comparison with larger Ducati superbikes ==
The 848 shares more physical and technical design elements with the stronger 1098/1198 than its predecessor, the 749, did with the 999. In many cases the 1098/1198 and the 848 are identical right down to the part numbers.

The two bikes use the same bodywork, including the fuel tank. With the exception of the steering damper mount, the frame between the bikes is the same, which results in identical wheelbase and rake and trail numbers. The second generation 848 Evo had the same monoblock brake calipers and the same frame with the steering damper mount as the 1098/1198. The 848 EVO Corse Special Edition uses the 330 mm front brake disk from the 1098/1198. The rear suspension, including the suspension linkage is the same, using identical Showa shocks. Many components of the exhaust system are shared, including the exhaust canisters that house the muffler and catalytic converter.

Despite the difference in engine displacement, the two bikes share valve angles and magnesium valve covers. The oil cooler and radiator are also very similar. The transmissions are different with the ratios on the 848 being closer together.
