= Kristian Lee Turner =

American motorcycle racer

Kris Turner
- Nationality: United States
- Born: 23 June 1992 (age 34); Chattanooga, Tennessee, United States

Kristian "Kris" Lee Turner is a Grand Prix motorcycle racer from the United States.

Turner began motocross racing at the age of three. At the age of 13, he began road racing, and by 14, he was competing in Europe on the Red Bull MotoGP Rookies circuit. He joined the circuit after winning one of 20 places out of 1,100 prospective young riders from across the United States and Europe.

In 2007, Turner left the Red Bull MotoGP Rookies Cup after being dropped by Red Bull Racing.

Turner later left professional racing after difficulty in finding a sponsor. After six years away from the sport, Turner made a comeback to racing in 2018. That year, he competed in the MotoAmerica Twins Cup, placing second on a Suzuki he self built with his father.

== Career statistics ==
=== Red Bull MotoGP Rookies Cup ===
==== Races by year ====
(key) (Races in bold indicate pole position, races in italics indicate fastest lap)

Year	1	2	3	4	5	6	7	8	Pos	Pts
2007	SPA; Ret	ITA; 3	GBR; NC	NED; 3	GER; 14	CZE; Ret	POR; 9	VAL; 8	10th	49

=== Grand Prix motorcycle racing ===
==== By season ====
Season	Class	Motorcycle	Team	Number	Race	Win	Podium	Pole	FLap	Pts	Plcd
2008	125cc	Aprilia	Veloce Racing	90	1	0	0	0	0	0	NC
Total					**1**	**0**	**0**	**0**	**0**	**0**	

==== Races by year ====
Yr	Class	Bike	1	2	3	4	5	6	7	8	9	10	11	12	13	14	15	16	17	Pos	Pts
2008	125cc	Aprilia	QAT	SPA	POR	CHN	FRA	ITA	CAT	GBR	NED	GER	CZE	RSM	INP; 29	JPN	AUS	MAL	VAL	NC	0
2010	125cc	Aprilia	QAT	SPA	FRA	ITA	GBR	NED	CAT	GER	CZE	INP; DNQ	RSM	ARA	JPN	MAL	AUS	POR	VAL	NC	0

=== MotoAmerica Twins Championship ===
==== Races by year ====
Year	Class	Team	1	2	3	4	5	6	7	8	9	10	11	Pos	Pts
2019	Twins	Suzuki	ATL	ATL; Ret	VIR; 11	RAM; 4	UMC; Ret	MON; 5	SON; 4	PIT; Ret	PIT; 5	NJR	ALA; 4	9th	66
