= Ben Bostrom =

American motorcycle racer (born 1974)

- Nationality: American
- Born: May 7, 1974 (age 52); Redding, California, U.S.
- Website: BenBostrom.com
Motorcycle racing career statistics
MotoGP World Championship
Active years	2011
Manufacturers	Honda
Championships	0
2011 championship position	NC (0 pts)
Starts / Wins / Podiums / Poles / F. laps / Points; 1 / 0 / 0 / 0 / 0 / 0
Superbike World Championship
Active years	1998–2002, 2005
Manufacturers	Honda, Ducati
Championships	0
2005 championship position	15th (58 pts)
Starts / Wins / Podiums / Poles / F. laps / Points; 104 / 7 / 17 / 2 / 5 / 872

Benjamin Bostrom (born May 7, 1974) is an American former professional motorcycle racer. From 1995 to 2011, he competed in the AMA Superbike Championship, the World Superbike Championship and the MotoGP world championship.

== Motorcycle racing career ==
The son of Dave Bostrom and nephew of Paul Bostrom, both successful dirt track racers, Bostrom began his motorcycle racing career in the same fashion by winning the American Motorcyclist Association (AMA) 600 Dirt Track National Championship in 1993. He switched to road racing in 1995.

Bostrom captured the AMA Superbike national championship as a Honda rider in 1998, without winning a race. A year later, Bostrom, astride a Ducati and still racing full-time in the AMA series, won a Laguna Seca Raceway World Superbike race (and finished second in another) as a wild card entry.

Bostrom first raced full-time in the Superbike World Championship in 2000 on a factory Ducati. In 2001, he won an unexpected six races, including five in a row on a factory L&M Ducati, to finish third overall. Bostrom did not win a race in 2002, and scored weaker results as the season progressed.

For 2003, Bostrom returned to the domestic series for American Honda on an RC51, staying there in 2004 on the brand new Honda Fireblade CBR1000RR. He finished fourth in AMA Superbike in both years. He made a return to international racing for 2005, with the Renegade Honda team in the World Superbike Championship, but was not successful. He qualified slowest of the 28 international entries in Qatar at the first round, but scored a few top-ten finishes during the season to come 14th overall.

Bostrom returned to Ducati as Neil Hodgson's teammate for the 2006 AMA Superbike Championship. Ducati withdrew from the AMA Superbike Championship at the end of 2006, leaving Bostrom to join the Yamaha/Graves Motorsports team in 2007 for a rebuilding year, riding in the AMA Superstock Championship, where he finished second in points, though unable to score a win.

In 2008, Bostrom switched from Superstock to Supersport and led the Graves Motorsports Yamaha team to an AMA championship in the 600cc class. At Virginia International Raceway that year, Bostrom finished second and gave his trophy to Sam Koup (the Grandson of racer Larry Koup), and distributed his champagne bottle and hats to others. Bostrom went on to win the 2008 Supersport Championship for under the Graves Motorsports banner. This was the last year of the AMA series before ownership transferred to the Daytona Motorsports Group, and the 600cc class was renamed AMA Daytona Sportbike.

For 2009, Bostrom raced a 1000cc Yamaha YZF-R1 in the American Superbike class. He also moonlighted in select 600cc events, including the season opener, Daytona 200, in which he took first place.

In addition to Superbike, Bostrom races Supermoto- a multi-discipline format involving off-road, flat track and road-racing in one event. Bostrom won the 2003 AMA Supermoto Championship and the gold medal at the inaugural X-Games Supermoto competition. The X-Games race (whose field included European Supermoto Champion Eddy Seel and seven-time Supercross champ, Jeremy McGrath) saw Bostrom win after nearly tipping over five laps from the finish. Ben also dabbles in journalism with an article entitled "Boz Bros Chronicles" which is featured in 2Wheel Tuner Magazine each month as well as Sportbikeclub.com.

In 2011, Bostrom made his MotoGP class début as a wildcard rider during the 2011 United States motorcycle Grand Prix in a Honda-backed LCR Team and thus became the oldest rookie to début in MotoGP class era at 37 years old (similar to Toshio Suzuki's feat at 1993 Japanese Grand Prix in Formula One).

In 2014, Bostrom was part of a winning team in the Race Across America, cycling alongside Dave Mirra, Micky Dymond and Dave Zabriskie.

Bostrom's brother, Eric, is also a professional motorcycle racer.

== Career statistics ==
=== Grand Prix motorcycle racing ===
==== By season ====
Year	Class	Motorcycle	Team	Number	Race	Win	Podium	Pole	FLap	Pts	Plcd	WCh
2011	MotoGP	Honda RC212V	LCR Honda MotoGP	23	1	0	0	0	0	0	NC	–
Total					**1**	**0**	**0**	**0**	**0**	**0**		**0**

==== By class ====
Class	Seasons	1st GP	1st Pod	1st Win	Race	Win	Podiums	Pole	FLap	Pts	WCh
MotoGP	2011	2011 United States			1	0	0	0	0	0	0
Total	2011				**1**	**0**	**0**	**0**	**0**	**0**	**0**

==== Races by year ====
(key) (Races in bold indicate pole position; races in italics indicate fastest lap)

Year	Class	Bike	1	2	3	4	5	6	7	8	9	10	11	12	13	14	15	16	17	18	Pos	Pts
2011	MotoGP	Honda	QAT	SPA	POR	FRA	CAT	GBR	NED	ITA	GER	USA; Ret	CZE	INP	RSM	ARA	JPN	AUS	MAL	VAL	NC	0

=== AMA Pro Racing ===
Year	Class	Team	Bike	DAY (Florida)		FON (California)		RAT (Georgia (U.S. state))		INF (California)		RAM (Wisconsin)		M-O (Ohio)		LAG (California)	VIR (Virginia)		N-J (New Jersey)		BAR (Alabama)		Pts	Pos
Year	Class	Team	Bike	R1	R2	R1	R2	R1	R2	R1	R2	R1	R2	R1	R2	R1	R1	R2	R1	R2	R1	R2	Pts	Pos
2010	SBK	Pat Clark Motorsports	Yamaha R1	18	3	8	6	4	Ret	2	2	7	6	2	4	**1**	**2**	2	3	Ret			295	**5th**

Year	Class	Team	Bike	DAY (Florida)	FON (California)		RAT (Georgia (U.S. state))		BAR (Alabama)		INF (California)		RAM (Wisconsin)		LAG (California)	M-O (Ohio)		HRT (Kansas)		VIR (Virginia)		N-J (New Jersey)		Pts	Pos
Year	Class	Team	Bike	R1	R1	R2	R1	R2	R1	R2	R1	R2	R1	R2	R1	R1	R2	R1	R2	R1	R2	R1	R2	Pts	Pos
2009	SBK	Graves Motorsports	Yamaha R1	6	7	5	8	8	3	3	9	2	3	5	5	4	2	2	19	3	3	4	23	333	**5th**

Year	Class	Team	Bike	DAY (Florida)	BAR (Alabama)	FON (California)	INF (California)	MIL (Utah)	RAM (Wisconsin)	LAG (California)	M-O (Ohio)	VIR (Virginia)	RAT (Georgia (U.S. state))	LAG (California)	Pts	Pos
2008	SS	Graves Motorsports	Yamaha R6	1	2	1	1	21	1	1	1	2	3	2	361	**1st**

Year	Class	Team	Bike	DAY (Florida)	BAR (Alabama)	FON (California)	INF (California)	RAM (Wisconsin)	MIL (Utah)	LAG (California)	M-O (Ohio)	VIR (Virginia)	RAT (Georgia (U.S. state))	LAG (California)	Pts	Pos
2007	SStk	Graves Motorsports	Yamaha R1	2	3	4	3	4	2	N/A	C	4	2	3	264	**2nd**

Year	Class	Team	Bike	DAY (Florida)	BAR (Alabama)		FON (California)		INF (California)		RAM (Wisconsin)		MIL (Utah)		LAG (California)	M-O (Ohio)		VIR (Virginia)		RAT (Georgia (U.S. state))		M-O (Ohio)	Pts	Pos
Year	Class	Team	Bike	R1	R1	R2	R1	R2	R1	R2	R1	R2	R1	R2	R1	R1	R2	R1	R2	R1	R2	R1	Pts	Pos
2006	SBK	Parts Unlimited Ducati	Ducati 999R	7	9	6	7	7	6	7	8	7	3	DNF	7	20	26	11	6	20	7	4	391	**9th**

Year	Class	Team	Bike	DAY (Florida)	FON (California)		INF (California)		BAR (Alabama)		PPK (Colorado)	RAM (Wisconsin)		BRD (Minnesota)	LAG (California)	M-O (Ohio)		RAT (Georgia (U.S. state))		VIR (Virginia)		Pts	Pos
Year	Class	Team	Bike	R1	R1	R2	R1	R2	R1	R2	R1	R1	R2	R1	R1	R1	R2	R1	R2	R1	R2	Pts	Pos
2004	SBK	Parts Unlimited Honda	Honda CBR1000RR	DNF	DNF	5	4	5	DNF	5	5	4	5	5	1	4	2	3	3	3	3	422	**4th**

Year	Class	Team	1		2		3	4		5		6		7	8		Pos	Pts
Year	Class	Team	R1	R2	R1	R2	R1	R1	R2	R1	R2	R1	R2	R1	R1	R2	Pos	Pts
2011	SuperBike	Suzuki	DAY; 4	DAY; 5	INF; 19	INF; 6	UTA; 8	RAM; 7	RAM; 10	BAR; 2	BAR; 5	MOH; 14	MOH; 6	LAG; 5	NJE; 2	NJE; 5	5th	209

=== AMA Formula Xtreme Championship ===
==== By year ====
Year	Class	Bike	1	2	3	4	5	6	7	8	9	10	11	Pos	Pts
2004	Formula Xtreme	Honda	DAY; 2	FON	INF	BAR	PPK	RAM	BRD	LAG; 1	M-O	RAT	VIR	19th	70
