= Larry Pegram =

American motorcycle racer

- Nationality: American
- Born: September 5, 1972 (age 54); Columbus, Ohio, U.S.
- Website: pegramracing.com
Motorcycle racing career statistics
Superbike World Championship
Active years	1996–1997, 2000, 2014–2015
Manufacturers	Ducati, Suzuki, EBR
Championships	0
2015 championship position	32nd (2 pts)
Starts / Wins / Podiums / Poles / F. laps / Points; 13 / 0 / 0 / 0 / 0 / 13
Supersport World Championship
Active years	1999
Manufacturers	Ducati
Championships	0
1999 championship position	33rd (7 pts)
Starts / Wins / Podiums / Poles / F. laps / Points; 3 / 0 / 0 / 0 / 0 / 7

Larry Pegram (born September 5, 1973 in Columbus, Ohio) is an American motorcycle racer.

== Racing history ==
=== AMA Superbike ===
Pegram has been in the AMA Superbike scene for over a decade, first entering the championship in 1996.

In 2009, Pegram had his best season finishing fourth overall with three wins and five podiums.

=== Superbike World Championship ===
Pegram made an appearance as a wildcard at Mazda Raceway Laguna Seca on July 13, 2014. After retiring in race one, he managed to score the two points in the second race, becoming the first rider in history to take an American machine into the points.

For 2015, Pegram was the manager and a team rider for Team Hero EBR alongside Niccolò Canepa.

==== America Flat Track ====
Pegram has been racing Flat Track since the age of five. He has three Grand National Flat Track wins. two half-mile, and one mile victory.

As an amateur, Pegram had over 33 national championship wins, an AMA record.

=== Pegram's wins in Superbike and Flat Track put him in a very small and elite group of riders. ===
==== Superbike Family Television Show ====
Pegram and his family were featured in a television show for three seasons called "Superbike Family". The show centers around family life at the races.

== Career statistics ==
=== AMA Pro American Superbike Championship ===
Season	Moto	Races	Wins	Pod	Pole	FLaps	Pts	Pos
1996	Ducati	-	-	-	-	-	-	7th
1997	Suzuki	-	-	-	-	-	-	10th
1998	Suzuki	-	-	-	-	-	-	14th
1999	Ducati	-	-	-	-	-	-	5th
2000	Ducati	-	-	-	-	-	-	13th
2001	Ducati	-	-	-	-	-	-	11th
2002	Suzuki	-	-	-	-	-	-	39th
2003	Ducati	-	-	-	-	-	-	14th
2004	Yamaha	-	-	-	-	-	-	12th
2005	Honda	-	-	-	-	-	-	14th
2006	Honda	-	-	-	-	-	-	10th
2009	Ducati	20	3	2	1	3	347	4th
2010	Ducati	19	1	5	0	0	297	4th
2011	BMW	14	0	0	0	0	190	7th
2012	BMW	20	0	0	0	0	260	7th
2013	Yamaha	14	0	3	0	0	190	6th
2014	EBR	10	0	1	0	0	105	9th

=== Superbike World Championship ===
==== Races by year ====
(key) (Races in bold indicate pole position, races in italics indicate fastest lap)

Year	Make	1		2		3		4		5		6		7		8		9		10		11		12		13		Pos.	Pts
Year	Make	R1	R2	R1	R2	R1	R2	R1	R2	R1	R2	R1	R2	R1	R2	R1	R2	R1	R2	R1	R2	R1	R2	R1	R2	R1	R2	Pos.	Pts
1996	Ducati	SMR	SMR	GBR	GBR	GER	GER	ITA	ITA	CZE	CZE	USA; 12	USA; 14	EUR	EUR	INA	INA	JPN	JPN	NED	NED	SPA	SPA	AUS	AUS			37th	6
1997	Suzuki	AUS	AUS	SMR	SMR	GBR	GBR	GER	GER	ITA	ITA	USA; DNQ	USA; DNQ	EUR	EUR	AUT	AUT	NED	NED	SPA	SPA	JPN	JPN	INA	INA			NC	0
2000	Ducati	RSA	RSA	AUS	AUS	JPN	JPN	GBR	GBR	ITA	ITA	GER	GER	SMR	SMR	SPA	SPA	USA; 17	USA; 13	EUR	EUR	NED	NED	GER	GER	GBR	GBR	44th	3
2014	EBR	AUS	AUS	SPA	SPA	NED	NED	ITA	ITA	GBR	GBR	MAL	MAL	SMR	SMR	POR	POR	USA; Ret	USA; 14	SPA	SPA	FRA	FRA	QAT	QAT			31st	2
2015	EBR	AUS; 18	AUS; 14	THA; Ret	THA; DNS	SPA; 17	SPA; 19	NED; Ret	NED; Ret	ITA	ITA	GBR	GBR	POR	POR	SMR	SMR	USA	USA	MAL	MAL	SPA	SPA	FRA	FRA	QAT	QAT	32nd	2

=== Supersport World Championship ===
==== Races by year ====
Year	Bike	1	2	3	4	5	6	7	8	9	10	11	Pos.	Pts
1999	Ducati	RSA	GBR	SPA	ITA	GER	SMR	USA	EUR	AUT; 13	NED; 12	GER; Ret	33rd	7

=== AMA Formula Xtreme Championship ===
==== By year ====
Year	Class	Bike	1	2	3	4	5	6	7	8	9	10	11	Pos	Pts
2004	Formula Xtreme	Yamaha	DAY	FON; 6	INF; 7	BAR; 6	PPK; 12	RAM; 8	BRD; 8	LAG; 8	M-O; 14	RAT; 5	VIR; Ret	5th	215
2007	Formula Xtreme	Ducati	DAY; 24	BAR; 6	FON; 3	INF; 5	RAM; 5	MIL; 14	LAG	OHI; 5	VIR; 2	RAT; 7	LAG; 2	4th	244

=== MotoAmerica SuperBike Championship ===
==== Races by year ====
Year	Class	Team	1		2		3		4		5		6		7	8		9		10		11		Pos	Pts
Year	Class	Team	R1	R2	R1	R2	R1	R2	R1	R2	R1	R2	R1	R2	R1	R1	R2	R1	R2	R1	R2	R1	R2	Pos	Pts
2004	SuperBike	Yamaha	DAY; 27		FON; 7	FON; 8	INF; 8	INF; 8	BAR; 11	BAR; Ret	PPK; 27		RAM; Ret	RAM; 8	BRD; 12	LAG; 9		M-O; 10	M-O; 8	RAT; 28	RAT; 7	VIR; DNS	VIR; DNS	12th	256
2005	SuperBike	Honda	DAY; 13		BAR; 12	BAR; 17	FON; Ret	FON; 10	INF; 8	INF; 10	PPK; 16		RAM; 8	RAM; 26	LAG; 12	M-O; 11	M-O; 10	VIR; DNS	VIR; DNS	RAT	RAT			14th	219
2006	SuperBike	Honda	DAY; 21		BAR; 12	BAR; 9	FON; 10	FON; 10	INF; 10	INF; 12	RAM; 13	RAM; 12	MIL; 12	MIL; 20	LAG; 13	OHI; 9	OHI; 11	VIR; 12	VIR; 11	RAT; 14	RAT; 16	OHI; 11		10th	351
2009	SuperBike	Ducati	DAY; 4		FON; 27	FON; 3	RAT; 7	RAT; 10	BAR; 6	BAR; 6	INF; 3	INF; 5	RAM; 4	RAM; 1	LAG; 10	OHI; 5	OHI; 5	HRT; 1	HRT; 1	VIR; 12	VIR; 4	NJE; 5	NJE; 4	4th	347
2010	SuperBike	Ducati	DAY; 3	DAY; 5	FON; 1	FON; 18	RAT; 14	RAT; 6	INF; 3	INF; 3	RAM; 4	RAM; 4	MOH; 4	MOH; 3	LAG; 5	VIR; 4	VIR; 9	NJE; 7	NJE; 14	BAR; Ret	BAR; 3			4th	297
2011	SuperBike	BMW	DAY; 7	DAY; 6	INF; 7	INF; 5	UTA; 16		RAM; 5	RAM; 7	BAR; 5	BAR; 6	MOH; 6	MOH; 7	LAG; 6	NJE; 7	NJE; 14							7th	190

Year	Class	Team	1		2		3		4		5		6		7		8			9			10		Pos	Pts
Year	Class	Team	R1	R2	R1	R2	R1	R2	R1	R2	R1	R2	R1	R2	R1	R2	R1	R2	R3	R1	R2	R3	R1	R2	Pos	Pts
2021	SuperBike	BMW	ATL	ATL	VIR	VIR	RAM; Ret	RAM; DNS	TRD	TRD	LGS	LGS	BRA	BRA	PIT	PIT	NJR	NJR	NJR	ALA	ALA	ALA			NC	0
2022	SuperBike	BMW	TEX	TEX	ATL	ATL	VIR	VIR	RAM; 9	RAM; 5	TRD	TRD	LGS; 11	LGS; 12	BRA	BRA	PIT	PIT		NJR	NJR		ALA	ALA	19th	27

=== MotoAmerica Superstock 1000 Championship ===
==== Races by year ====
Year	Class	Team	1		2		3	4		5	6	7	8	9	Pos	Pts
Year	Class	Team	R1	R2	R1	R2	R2	R1	R2	R1	R1	R1	R1	R1	Pos	Pts
2021	Superstock 1000	Suzuki	ATL	ATL	VIR	VIR	RAM; 9	RID	RID	MON	BRA	PIT	NJR	ALA	29th	7

=== MotoAmerica Supersport Championship ===
==== Races by year ====
Year	Class	Bike	1	2	3	4	5	6	7	8	9	10	11	12	13	14	15	16	17	18	Pos	Pts
2025	Supersport	Suzuki	ALA	ALA	ATL	ATL	RAM; 12	RAM; 9	RID	RID	MON	MON	VIR	VIR	MID	MID	TEX	TEX	NJR	NJR	20th*	11*
