= Barrett Long =

American motorcycle racer

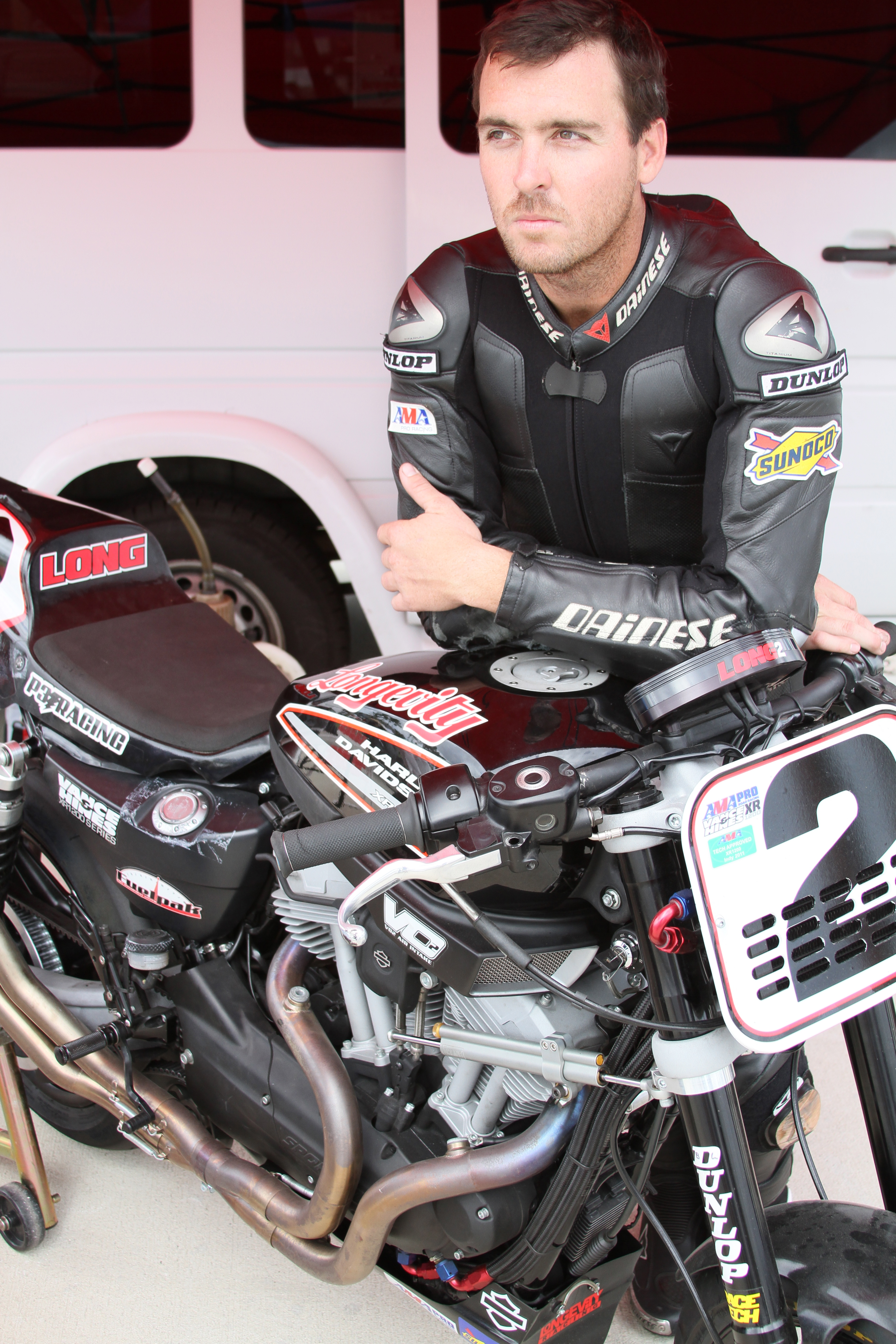
- Nationality: American
- Born: 9 April 1984 (age 42); Miami, Florida
- Current team: Longevity Racing
- Bike number: 29
- Website: www.long29.com

Barrett Long is a Grand Prix motorcycle racer from United States. He races in the MotoAmerica Superstock 1000 Championship aboard a Ducati Panigale.

== Career statistics ==
=== AMA Supersport Championship ===
==== By year ====
Year	Class	Bike	1	2	3	4	5	6	7	8	9	10	11	Pos	Pts
2005	Supersport	Yamaha	DAY; Ret	BAR; 19	FON; 17	INF; 15	PPK; 16	RAM; 19	LAG; 13	M-O; 15	VIR; 14	RAT; 15		14th	135
2006	Supersport	Yamaha	DAY; 16	BAR; 23	FON; 14	INF; C	RAM	MIL	LAG; 16	OHI	VIR; 14	RAT; 15	OHI	18th	88

=== MotoAmerica SuperBike Championship ===
Year	Class	Team	1		2		3		4		5		6		7	8		9		10		11		Pos	Pts
Year	Class	Team	R1	R2	R1	R2	R1	R2	R1	R2	R1	R2	R1	R2	R1	R1	R2	R1	R2	R1	R2	R1	R2	Pos	Pts
2009	SuperBike	Ducati	DAY; 17		FON	FON	RAT; 12	RAT; 18	BAR; 15	BAR; 20	INF	INF	RAM	RAM	LAG	OHI; 17	OHI; 12	HRT	HRT	VIR	VIR	NJE	NJE	24th	36
2010	SuperBike	Ducati	DAY; 10	DAY; Ret	FON	FON	RAT; 10	RAT; 10	INF	INF	RAM	RAM	MOH	MOH	LAG	VIR	VIR	NJE	NJE	BAR	BAR			23rd	33

=== Grand Prix motorcycle racing ===
==== By season ====
Season	Class	Motorcycle	Team	Number	Race	Win	Podium	Pole	FLap	Pts	Plcd
2008	250cc	Yamaha	Longevity Racing	29	0	0	0	0	0	0	NC
2009	250cc	Yamaha	Longevity Racing	29	1	0	0	0	0	0	NC
Total					1	0	0	0	0	0	

==== Races by year ====
(key)

Year	Class	Bike	1	2	3	4	5	6	7	8	9	10	11	12	13	14	15	16	17	Pos	Pts
2008	250cc	Yamaha	QAT	SPA	POR	CHN	FRA	ITA	CAT	GBR	NED	GER	CZE	RSM	INP; C	JPN	AUS	MAL	VAL	NC	0
2009	250cc	Yamaha	QAT	JPN	SPA	FRA	ITA	CAT	NED	USA	GER	GBR	CZE	INP; 18	RSM	POR	AUS	MAL	VAL	NC	0
