= 2023 MotoAmerica Supersport Championship =

Record of 2022 Racing Season

The 2023 MotoAmerica Supersport Championship season was the 9th season of the MotoAmerica Supersport class. The defending class champion was Josh Herrin, who vacated his title during 2023 to race in MotoAmerica Superbike.

== Introduction of Extended Race Format ==
For the 2023 Supersport championship season, MotoAmerica piloted an extended race distance concept at the Barber Motorsports Park and Laguna Seca events. The extended races were double distance; therefore, worth double the points. The extended distance required the teams to make a pitstop of minimum prescribed time to refuel the bike and make tire changes. Xavi Fores and the Warhorse HSBK Ducati team won both of the extended Supersport races during the 2023 season.

== Josh Hayes Achieves Record AMA Career Wins ==
During the 2022 Supersport season, Josh Hayes tied Miguel Duhamel's record for all-time career wins in AMA Pro Road Racing by taking a double victory at New Jersey Motorsports Park. An unfortunate injury at Barber Motorsports Park during the final round of the 2022 season ended Hayes' attempt for the record that season, but Hayes returned for another season of Supersport competition with the SquidHunter Racing Team in 2023. On July 29, 2023, Hayes took victory in Race 1 at Brainerd International Raceway to score his 87th career victory, taking sole possession of the record for career wins in AMA Pro Road Racing competition. Hayes added his 88th career win in the final race of the 2023 season at New Jersey Motorsports Park.

== Calendar and results ==
Round	Circuit	Date	Race 1 Winner	Race 2 Winner
	(Florida) Daytona International Speedway	March 10–12	Non-championship event	Non-championship event
1	(Georgia (U.S. state)) Road Atlanta	April 21–23	(Spain) Xavi Forés	(Spain) Xavi Forés
2	Alabama	May 19–22	(Spain) Xavi Forés	No event held
3	(Wisconsin) Road America	June 2–4	(Spain) Xavi Forés	(Spain) Xavi Forés
4	(Washington (state)) The Ridge	June 23–25	(Spain) Xavi Forés	(Spain) Xavi Forés
5	(California) Monterey	July 6–8	(Spain) Xavi Forés	No event held
6	(Minnesota) Brainerd	July 28–30	(United States) Josh Hayes	(United States) Tyler Scott
7	(Pennsylvania) Pittsburgh	August 18–20	(Colombia) Stefano Mesa	(United States) Tyler Scott
8	Texas	September 8–10	(Spain) Xavi Forés	(United States) Tyler Scott
9	New Jersey	September 22–24	(United States) Tyler Scott	(United States) Josh Hayes

== Teams and riders ==
2023 Entry List
Team	Constructor	No.	Rider	Rounds
3D Motorsports	Suzuki	93	(United States) Damian Jigalov	1, 2, 3, 4, 5, 7, 8
3D Motorsports	Yamaha	88	(United States) Kory Pappas	7, 8
A Fresh Face Racing	Kawasaki	46	(United States) Quincy Bowers	5
Altus Motorsports	Suzuki	59	(United States) Jaret Nassaney	All
AMD Racing	Yamaha	30	(United States) Andrew Forsythe	5, 6, 7, 8
Behmer Racing	Suzuki	67	(United States) Justen Behmer	1, 3, 4, 6, 7
Blackall Racing	Yamaha	11	(United States) Tony Blackall	7
Blackhawk Racing	Yamaha	50	(United States) Joshua Booth	1, 3, 7
Burleson Racing	Kawasaki	96	(United States) Isaiah Burleson	1, 3
Competition Werkes MV Agusta	MV Agusta	63	(United States) Andy DiBrino	4, 5, 8
Cycle Pros Racing	Yamaha	18	(United States) Jake Vandal	8
Cycle Tech	Yamaha	45	(United States) Hayden Schultz	7, 9
Davis Racing	Kawasaki	43	(United States) Larry Davis	3, 6, 7, 8
DiBrino Racing KTM	MV Agusta	63	(United States) Andy DiBrino	4, 5, 8
Dirty T Race Team	Suzuki	54	(United States) Jordan Tropkoff	1, 2, 3, 7, 8
Disrupt Racing	Suzuki	28	(United States) Cory Ventura	1, 2
Disrupt Racing	Suzuki	85	(United States) Jake Lewis	3, 4, 5, 6, 7, 8, 9
DVR Racing	Yamaha	25	(Australia) Declan van Rosmalen	1, 2, 3, 4, 5, 9
EZ Racing	Kawasaki	27	(Mexico) Edgar Zaragoza	1, 3, 4, 5, 6, 8, 9
EZ Racing	Yamaha	89	(Mexico) Ivan Muñoz	3, 5
Farrell Performance	Kawasaki	84	(United States) Jason Farrell	3
Faster Than Cancer Foundation	Kawasaki	29	(United States) David Kohlstaedt	4
Ferg Factory Racing	Yamaha	83	(United States) Wyatt Ferguson	7
Hartluck Racing	Suzuki	53	(United States) Corey Hart	2
HONOS	Yamaha	80	(Mexico) Aldo Rovirosa	1, 3
HONOS	Ducati	71	(Mexico) Jorge Ehrenstein	1, 3, 5, 8
Hopkins Racing	Yamaha	39	(United States) Sean Hopkins	1, 2, 7
Jarritos Motorsports	Yamaha	77	(United States) Anthony Cano	7
JPH Suspension/WonderCBD Racing	Kawasaki	24	(United States) Andrew Gawer	
LFrey Racing	Yamaha	58	(United States) Timothy Frey	2
Mallory Dobbs Racing/Ducati Richmond	Kawasaki	36	(United States) Mallory Dobbs	1, 2, 3, 4, 5, 6, 7, 8
Michael Gilbert Racing	Suzuki	78	(Venezuela) Alejandro Thermiotis	1, 3, 4, 5
Michael Gilbert Racing	Suzuki	32	(United States) Joseph LiMandri Jr	7, 9
Michael Gilbert Racing	Suzuki	55	(United States) Michael Gilbert	1, 2, 3, 4, 5, 6
Michael Gilbert Racing	Suzuki	15	(United States) Owen Williams	3, 4, 5, 6, 7, 8, 9
Mosites Motorsports	Kawasaki	84	(United States) Gary Yancoskie	7
MotoZ Racing	Yamaha	98	(United States) Chris Murphy	7, 9
N2 Racing/BobbleHeadMoto	Yamaha	22	(United States) Blake Davis	3, 6
North East Cycle Outlet Racing	Yamaha	23	(United States) Anthony Mazziotto	All
North East Cycle Outlet Racing	Yamaha	20	(United States) CJ LaRoche	All
ODI Racing	Yamaha	90	(United States) David Ortiz	1, 2
Open Source Racing	Yamaha	92	(United States) Joel Ohman	6, 7, 8, 9
OTW Racing	Kawasaki	21	(United States) Jordan Eubanks	8
Seethaler Racing	Kawasaki	62	(United States) Nathan Seethaler	1, 2, 7
Shurtech Racing	Yamaha	51	(United States) Dylan Yelton	2, 7
Silva Brothers	Kawasaki	57	(United States) Bruno Silva	9
Silva Brothers	Kawasaki	26	(United States) Fernando Silva	9
Silva Brothers	Kawasaki	41	(Brazil) Lucas Silva	9
Squid Hunter Racing	Yamaha	4	(United States) Josh Hayes	All
SWG Motorsports	Suzuki	60	(United States) Carl Soltisz	All
SWG Motorsports	Yamaha	40	(United States) Kevin Horney	2, 7
Team Brazil	MV Agusta	17	(Brazil) Danilo Lewis	1
Team Schwags	Yamaha	38	(United States) Jonathan Schweiger	3
Team Velocity Racing	Yamaha	13	(United States) Chuck Ivey	1, 2
Top Pro Motorsports	Kawasaki	72	(United States) Michael Blaum	
Trees Racing	Yamaha	94	(United States) Jared Trees	8
TSE Racing	Yamaha	34	(United States) Kevin Gorman	3
Turn One Racing	Yamaha	49	(United States) Blake Holt	7, 8
Tytlers Cycle Racing	Kawasaki	19	(United States) Kayla Yaakov	8, 9
Tytlers Cycle Racing	Kawasaki	37	(Colombia) Stefano Mesa	1, 2, 3, 4, 5, 6, 7
Vestment Realty Powered By Realty One Group	Yamaha	31	(United States) Rodney Vest	1
Vision Wheel M4 ECSTAR Suzuki	Suzuki	79	(United States) Teagg Hobbs	All
Vision Wheel M4 ECSTAR Suzuki	Suzuki	14	(Canada) Torin Collins	8
Vision Wheel M4 ECSTAR Suzuki	Suzuki	70	(United States) Tyler Scott	All
Warhorse HSBK Racing Ducati	Ducati	12	(Spain) Xavi Fores	All
Wawa Racing	Kawasaki	65	(Israel) Sahar Zvik	5
Wreckers To Checkers	Triumph	66	(United States) Brian Mullins	1, 3
Wrench Motorcycles	Suzuki	52	(Australia) David Anthony	4, 5, 6, 7, 8, 9

== Championship standings ==
Scoring system

Points are awarded to the top fifteen finishers. A rider has to finish the race to earn points.

Position	1st	2nd	3rd	4th	5th	6th	7th	8th	9th	10th	11th	12th	13th	14th	15th
Points	25	20	16	13	11	10	9	8	7	6	5	4	3	2	1

Pos	Rider	Bike	RAT (Georgia (U.S. state))		ALA (Alabama)	RAM (Wisconsin)		RID (Washington (state))		MON (California)	BRA (Minnesota)		PIT (Pennsylvania)		TEX (Texas)		NJE (New Jersey)		Pts
Pos	Rider	Bike	R1	R2	EXT	R1	R2	R1	R2	EXT	R1	R2	R1	R2	R1	R2	R1	R2	Pts
1	(Spain) Xavi Fores	Ducati	1	1	1	1	1	1	1	1	7	4	2	2	1	2	9	Ret	364
2	(United States) Tyler Scott	Suzuki	2	4	6	6	3	4	2	3	3	1	3	1	2	1	1	8	304
3	(United States) Josh Hayes	Yamaha	3	3	5	3	4	2	Ret	2	1	2	6	5	21	5	5	1	256
4	(Colombia) Stefano Mesa	Kawasaki	4	2	2	2	2	Ret	5	4	5	5	1	3					213
5	(United States) Teagg Hobbs	Suzuki	6	6	7	4	DNS	3	3	5	4	16	5	4	3	DNS	8	17	166
6	(United States) Anthony Mazziotto	Yamaha	10	9	3	9	Ret	8	6	19	8	8	7	7	16	DNS	2	2	144
7	(United States) Jake Lewis	Suzuki				8	6	5	4	6	6	6	4	6	6	DNS	7	3	140
8	(Australia) David Anthony	Suzuki						7	Ret	7	9	7	Ret	8	5	4	4	5	99
9	(United States) Michael Gilbert	Suzuki	5	5	4	5	5	12	9	Ret	12	12							89
10	(United States) Carl Soltisz	Suzuki	7	Ret	13	7	11	13	10	Ret	13	13	10	12	7	6	11	11	83
11	(United States) CJ LaRoche	Yamaha	11	11	8	11	Ret	9	12	8	15	14	13	14	17	12	12	12	78
12	(United States) Jaret Nassaney	Suzuki	Ret	7	Ret	Ret	8	Ret	11	Ret	14	11	9	11	10	8	6	6	75
13	(United States) Damian Jigalov	Suzuki	8	8	9	12	9	15	16	11			12	10	12	11			71
14	(United States) Owen Williams	Suzuki				15	14	14	14	9	16	15	14	15	15	9	13	7	45
15	(United States) Kayla Yaakov	Kawasaki													14	10	3	4	37
16	(United States) Rocco Landers	Yamaha									2	3							36
17	(United States) Andy DiBrino	MV Agusta						6	8	10					11				35
18	(Canada) Torin Collins	Suzuki													4	3			29
19	(United States) Blake Davis	Yamaha				10	7				11	10							26
20	(United States) Hayden Schultz	Yamaha											8	9			DNS	10	21
21	(United States) Nicholas Ciling	Yamaha			11	13	12												17
22	(Argentina) Maximiliano Gerardo	Kawasaki													8	7			17
23	(Venezuela) Alejandro Thermiotis	Suzuki	14	12		14	Ret	11	13	Ret									16
24	(United States) David Kohlstaedt	Kawasaki						10	7										15
25	(United States) Bruno Silva	Kawasaki															10	9	13
26	(United States) Cory Ventura	Suzuki	9	10	Ret														13
27	(Canada) Loic Arbel	Suzuki									10	9							13
28	(United States) Sean Hopkins	Yamaha	16	17	10								27	26					12
29	(United States) Joseph LiMandri Jr.	Suzuki											11	13			Ret	13	11
30	(Mexico) Aldo Rovirosa	Yamaha	13	14		16	13												8
31	(United States) Andrew Forsythe	Yamaha								12	Ret		19	18	25	17			8
32	(United States) Nathan Seethaler	Kawasaki	17	18	12									Ret					8
33	(United States) Blake Holt	Yamaha											Ret	16	9	Ret			7
34	(Brazil) Danilo Lewis	MV Agusta	12	13															7
35	(Australia) Declan van Rosmalen	Yamaha	18	16	Ret	DNS	17	18	19	13							DNS	20	6
36	(Mexico) Edgar Zaragoza	Kawasaki	23	Ret		20	18	16	15	14	21	20			26	15	Ret	Ret	6
37	(United States) Jason Farrell	Kawasaki				Ret	10												6
38	(United States) Chuck Ivey	Yamaha	19	19	14														4
39	(United States) Chris Murphy	Yamaha											23	27			15	14	3
40	(United States) Isaiah Burleson	Kawasaki	15	15		17	15												3
41	(Mexico) Jorge Ehrenstein	Ducati	20			18	16			16					18	13			3
42	(United States) Cody Wyman	Suzuki													13	Ret			3
43	(United States) Jared Trees	Yamaha													20	14			2
44	(United States) Mallory Dobbs	Kawasaki	24	Ret	17	23	20	17	17	15	19	19	24	28	27	Ret			2
45	(United States) Timothy Frey	Yamaha			15														2
46	(United States) Jacob Crossman	Kawasaki															14	16	2
47	(United States) Fernando Silva	Kawasaki																15	1
48	(United States) Gary Yancoskie	Kawasaki											15	Ret					1
49	(United States) Larry Davis	Kawasaki				21	19				18	18	20	17	19	Ret			0
50	(United States) Kory Pappas	Yamaha											16	25	23	DNS			0
51	(United States) Anthony Cano	Yamaha												Ret					0
52	(Mexico) Ivan Muñoz	Yamaha				22	22			Ret									0
53	(United States) Kevin Gorman	Yamaha				25	Ret												0
54	(United States) Jordan Tropkoff	Suzuki	25	22	Ret	19	23						18	19	Ret	16			0
55	(United States) Cory Hart	Suzuki			16														0
56	(Israel) Sahar Zvik	Kawasaki								17									0
57	(United States) Joel Ohman	Yamaha									17	17	Ret	20	22	19	16	18	0
58	(United States) Jake Vandal	Yamaha													24	18			0
59	(United States) Quincy Bowers	Kawasaki								18									0
60	(United States) David Ortiz	Yamaha	Ret	24	18														0
61	(Brazil) Lucas Silva	Kawasaki															DNS	19	0
62	(United States) Jordan Eubanks	Kawasaki													Ret	20			0
63	(United States) Tony Blackall	Yamaha											25	21					0
64	(United States) Jonathan Schweiger	Yamaha				Ret	21												0
65	(United States) Wyatt Ferguson	Yamaha											21	22					0
66	(United States) Dylan Yelton	Yamaha			Ret								17	23					0
67	(United States) Kevin Horney	Yamaha			Ret								22	24					0
68	(United States) Brian Mullins	Triumph	Ret	23		26	24												0
69	(United States) Rodney Vest	Yamaha	26																0
70	(United States) Justen Behmer	Suzuki	21	20		24	Ret	19	18		20		26	29					0
71	(United States) Joshua Booth	Yamaha	22	21		Ret	25						28	30					0
Pos	Rider	Bike	RAT (Georgia (U.S. state))		ALA (Alabama)	RAM (Wisconsin)		RID (Washington (state))		MON (California)	BRA (Minnesota)		PIT (Pennsylvania)		TEX (Texas)		NJE (New Jersey)		Pts
