= 2009 AMA Pro American Superbike Championship =

2009 AMA Pro Am Superbike Championship

Seasons
- ← 2008 2010 →

The 2009 AMA Pro American Superbike Championship was the 34th running of the AMA Superbike Championship, an American motorcycle racing championship. Mat Mladin won his seventh championship and announced his retirement following the season.

== Calendar and results ==
| No | | Date | Circuit | Location | Pole position | Fastest lap | Winner |
|---|---|---|---|---|---|---|---|
| 1 | R1 | March 5 | (Florida) Daytona International Speedway | Daytona Beach, Florida | (Australia) Mat Mladin | (United States) Tommy Hayden | (Australia) Mat Mladin |
| 2 | R1 | March 21 | (California) Auto Club Speedway | Fontana, California | (Australia) Mat Mladin | (Australia) Mat Mladin | (Australia) Mat Mladin |
| 2 | R2 | March 22 | (California) Auto Club Speedway | Fontana, California | (Australia) Mat Mladin | (Australia) Mat Mladin | (Australia) Mat Mladin |
| 3 | R1 | April 4 | (Georgia (U.S. state)) Road Atlanta | Braselton, Georgia | (Australia) Mat Mladin | (Australia) Mat Mladin | (Australia) Mat Mladin |
| 3 | R2 | April 5 | (Georgia (U.S. state)) Road Atlanta | Braselton, Georgia | (Australia) Mat Mladin | (Australia) Mat Mladin | (Australia) Mat Mladin |
| 4 | R1 | May 2 | (Alabama) Barber Motorsports Park | Leeds, Alabama | (Australia) Mat Mladin | (United States) Tommy Hayden | (Australia) Mat Mladin |
| 4 | R2 | May 3 | (Alabama) Barber Motorsports Park | Leeds, Alabama | (Australia) Mat Mladin | (Australia) Mat Mladin | (Australia) Mat Mladin |
| 5 | R1 | May 16 | (California) Infineon Raceway | Sonoma, California | (Australia) Mat Mladin | (United States) Josh Hayes | (United States) Josh Hayes |
| 5 | R2 | May 17 | (California) Infineon Raceway | Sonoma, California | (Australia) Mat Mladin | (Australia) Mat Mladin | (Australia) Mat Mladin |
| 6 | R1 | June 6 | (Wisconsin) Road America | Elkhart Lake, Wisconsin | (Australia) Mat Mladin | (United Kingdom) Michael Laverty | (Australia) Mat Mladin |
| 6 | R2 | June 7 | (Wisconsin) Road America | Elkhart Lake, Wisconsin | (Australia) Mat Mladin | (Australia) Mat Mladin | (United States) Larry Pegram |
| 7 | R1 | July 5 | (California) Mazda Raceway Laguna Seca | Monterey, California | (Australia) Mat Mladin | (Australia) Mat Mladin | (Australia) Mat Mladin |
| 8 | R1 | July 18 | Mid-Ohio Sports Car Course | Lexington, Ohio | (United States) Josh Hayes | (United States) Aaron Yates | (United States) Josh Hayes |
| 8 | R2 | July 19 | Mid-Ohio Sports Car Course | Lexington, Ohio | (United States) Josh Hayes | (United States) Ben Bostrom | (United States) Josh Hayes |
| 9 | R1 | August 1 | (Kansas) Heartland Park Topeka | Topeka, Kansas | (United States) Larry Pegram | (United States) Larry Pegram | (United States) Larry Pegram |
| 9 | R2 | August 2 | (Kansas) Heartland Park Topeka | Topeka, Kansas | (United States) Larry Pegram | (United States) Tommy Hayden | (United States) Larry Pegram |
| 10 | R1 | August 15 | Virginia International Raceway | Danville, Virginia | (United States) Josh Hayes | (United States) Josh Hayes | (United States) Josh Hayes |
| 10 | R2 | August 16 | Virginia International Raceway | Danville, Virginia | (United States) Josh Hayes | (United States) Josh Hayes | (United States) Josh Hayes |
| 11 | R1 | September 5 | New Jersey Motorsports Park | Millville, New Jersey | (Australia) Mat Mladin | (Australia) Mat Mladin | (United States) Josh Hayes |
| 11 | R2 | September 6 | New Jersey Motorsports Park | Millville, New Jersey | (Australia) Mat Mladin | (United States) Tommy Hayden | (United States) Josh Hayes |

== Championship standings ==
| Pos | Rider | Make | DAY | FON | | RAT | | BAR | | INF | | RAM | | LAG | M-O | | HRT | | VIR | | N-J | | Pts |
| Pos | Rider | Make | DAY | R1 | R2 | R1 | R2 | R1 | R2 | R1 | R2 | R1 | R2 | LAG | R1 | R2 | R1 | R2 | R1 | R2 | R1 | R2 | Pts |
|---|---|---|---|---|---|---|---|---|---|---|---|---|---|---|---|---|---|---|---|---|---|---|---|
| 1 | (Australia) Mat Mladin | Suzuki | **1** | **1** | **1** | **1** | **1** | **1** | **1** | **5** | **1** | **1** | **2** | **1** | 3 | 7 | | | 2 | 9 | 24 | 2 | 453 |
| 2 | (United States) Josh Hayes | Yamaha | 8 | 6 | 6 | 5 | 4 | 5 | 4 | 1 | 4 | 17 | 25 | 4 | **1** | **1** | 6 | 3 | **1** | **1** | **1** | **1** | 406 |
| 3 | (United States) Tommy Hayden | Suzuki | 3 | 2 | 2 | 2 | 6 | 4 | 8 | 2 | 3 | 9 | 7 | 8 | 6 | 3 | 4 | 2 | 5 | 2 | 2 | 22 | 373 |
| 4 | (United States) Larry Pegram | Ducati | 4 | 27 | 3 | 7 | 10 | 6 | 6 | 3 | 5 | 4 | 1 | 10 | 5 | 5 | 1 | 1 | 12 | 4 | 5 | 4 | 347 |
| 5 | (United States) Ben Bostrom | Yamaha | 6 | 7 | 5 | 8 | 8 | 3 | 3 | 9 | 2 | 3 | 5 | 5 | 4 | 2 | 2 | 19 | 3 | 3 | 4 | 23 | 333 |
| 6 | (United States) Blake Young | Suzuki | 5 | 4 | 9 | 4 | 2 | 2 | 25 | | | 5 | 8 | 2 | 7 | 4 | 3 | 8 | 6 | 7 | 7 | 9 | 290 |
| 6 | (United States) Aaron Yates | Suzuki | 7 | 15 | 10 | 6 | 5 | 10 | 2 | 4 | 21 | 6 | 3 | 3 | 2 | 23 | 5 | 21 | 4 | 5 | 3 | 3 | 290 |
| 8 | (United States) Geoff May | Suzuki | 10 | 3 | 4 | 3 | 3 | 7 | 5 | 15 | 6 | 27 | 4 | 9 | 8 | 8 | 8 | 20 | 26 | 22 | 10 | 10 | 234 |
| 9 | (United States) Taylor Knapp | Suzuki | 31 | 9 | 7 | 17 | 7 | 9 | 9 | 6 | 7 | 25 | 24 | 11 | | | 9 | 5 | 8 | 6 | | | 207 |
| 9 | (United States) Taylor Knapp | Buell | | | | | | | | | | | | | 12 | 10 | | | | | 6 | 12 | 207 |
| 10 | (United States) Jake Holden | Honda | 35 | 5 | 24 | 10 | 9 | 8 | 7 | 21 | 20 | 12 | 9 | 7 | 9 | 21 | 7 | 4 | 7 | 10 | 11 | 6 | 195 |
| 11 | (United Kingdom) Neil Hodgson | Honda | 2 | | | | | | | 23 | 9 | 16 | 6 | 6 | 11 | 9 | 10 | 6 | 11 | 8 | 13 | 5 | 167 |
| 12 | (United States) Chris Ulrich | Suzuki | 14 | 11 | 26 | 11 | 12 | 14 | 11 | 8 | 22 | 11 | 14 | 12 | 13 | 22 | 11 | 9 | 13 | 12 | 12 | 13 | 156 |
| 13 | (Australia) David Anthony | Suzuki | 30 | 8 | 8 | 9 | 11 | 11 | 10 | 7 | 8 | 8 | 10 | 26 | 26 | 24 | | | | | | | 120 |
| 14 | (United States) Scott Jensen | Honda | 16 | 16 | 12 | 15 | 15 | 26 | 12 | 12 | 11 | | | | 14 | 13 | 13 | 11 | 16 | 23 | 19 | 15 | 105 |
| 15 | (United Kingdom) Michael Laverty | Suzuki | 9 | | | | | 12 | 24 | | | 2 | 22 | | 10 | 6 | 22 | 7 | 9 | 24 | | | 98 |
| 16 | (Australia) Aaron Gobert | Suzuki | 12 | 10 | 11 | 16 | 13 | 17 | 13 | 14 | 12 | 26 | 12 | 14 | | | | | | | | | 87 |
| 17 | (United States) Hawk Mazzotta | Suzuki | 13 | 14 | 13 | 14 | 14 | 16 | 17 | 13 | 14 | | | 13 | | | | | | | | | 69 |
| 18 | (United States) Shawn Higbee | Buell | 25 | 18 | 15 | | | 20 | 19 | | | 18 | 15 | 20 | 18 | 15 | 14 | 13 | 18 | 16 | 18 | 17 | 61 |
| 19 | (United States) Shane Narbonne | Suzuki | 19 | 25 | 14 | 20 | 20 | 23 | 21 | | | 14 | 11 | | 15 | 16 | | | 15 | 17 | 15 | 16 | 60 |
| 20 | (United States) Mark Crozier | Yamaha | 20 | | | 18 | 17 | 21 | 14 | 11 | 15 | 10 | 27 | | 25 | 25 | | | 17 | 14 | 17 | 20 | 42 |
| 21 | (United States) Ryan Elleby | Suzuki | 33 | | | 13 | 16 | 13 | 26 | 20 | 10 | 7 | 13 | | | | | | | | | | 55 |
| 22 | (Australia) Scott Charlton | Suzuki | | | | | | | | | | | | | | | 12 | 10 | 14 | 13 | 14 | 11 | 52 |
| 23 | (United States) Eric Haugo | Suzuki | | 24 | 16 | 21 | 22 | 19 | 16 | 17 | 16 | 15 | 16 | 21 | | | 18 | 17 | 22 | 20 | 21 | 21 | 32 |
| 24 | (United States) Barrett Long | Ducati | 17 | | | 12 | 18 | 15 | 20 | | | | | | 17 | 12 | | | | | | | 36 |
| 25 | (United States) Dean Mizdal | Suzuki | 23 | 20 | 18 | | | | | 16 | 17 | | | 17 | 19 | 17 | 17 | 15 | 21 | 18 | | | 36 |
| 26 | (United States) Jeff Wood | Suzuki | 11 | | | | | | | | | | | | | | | | 10 | 11 | | | 31 |
| 27 | (United States) Cory West | Buell | | | | | | | | | | | | | | | | | | | 8 | 7 | 27 |
| 28 | (United States) Ricky Corey | Yamaha | | | | | | | | | | | | 15 | | | | | 19 | 15 | 16 | 14 | 26 |
| 29 | (Australia) Damian Cudlin | Suzuki | | | | | | | | | | | | | | | | | | | 9 | 8 | 25 |
| 30 | (United States) Cory Call | Suzuki | | | | | | | | 10 | 13 | | | 16 | | | | | | | | | 24 |
| 26 | (United States) Jeffrey Tigert | Honda | 15 | 13 | 27 | | | | | | | | | | | | | | | | | | 14 |
| 27 | (United States) John Page | Suzuki | 26 | | | | | 22 | 15 | 18 | 19 | | | 22 | | | | | | | | | 11 |
| 29 | (United States) Doug Polen | Yamaha | | | | | | | | | | 13 | 19 | | | | | | | | | | 10 |
| 30 | (United States) Skip Salenius | Suzuki | | | | 19 | 19 | 18 | 18 | | | | | | | | | | | | | | 10 |
| 31 | (United States) Jeremy Toye | Honda | | 12 | 22 | | | | | | | | | 27 | | | | | | | | | 9 |
| 33 | (United States) Brad Puetz | Suzuki | | 23 | 21 | | | | | 19 | 18 | | | 25 | | | | | | | | | 5 |
| 34 | (United States) Josh Graham | Suzuki | 27 | 21 | 17 | 22 | 21 | | | | | | | | | | | | | | | | 4 |
| 35 | (United States) Trent Gibson | Suzuki | | | | | | | | | | 21 | 17 | | | | | | | | | | 4 |
| 36 | (United States) Brad Hendry | Ducati | 22 | 17 | 23 | | | | | | | | | | | | | | | | | | 4 |
| 37 | (United States) Ron Hix | Suzuki | | | | | | | | | | 20 | 18 | | | | | | | | | | 4 |
| 38 | (United States) Reno Karimian | Suzuki | 24 | 19 | 25 | | | | | | | | | 19 | | | | | | | | | 4 |
| 39 | (United States) Dominic Jones | Suzuki | | | | | | | | | | 23 | 26 | 18 | | | | | | | | | 4 |
| 40 | (United States) Scott Greenwood | Suzuki | 18 | | | | | | | | | | | | | | | | | | | | 3 |
| 41 | (United States) Brian Boyd | Suzuki | | | | | | | | | | 19 | 20 | | | | | | | | | | 3 |
| 42 | (United States) Davie Stone | Honda | 29 | 26 | 19 | | | | | | | | | 23 | | | | | | | | | 2 |
| 43 | (United States) Mark Simon | Suzuki | | 22 | 20 | | | | | 22 | 23 | | | | | | | | | | | | 1 |
| 44 | (United States) Marcin Biernacki | Suzuki | | | | | | | | | | 24 | 21 | | | | | | | | | | 0 |
| 45 | (Canada) Brett McCormick | Suzuki | 21 | | | | | | | | | | | | | | | | | | | | 0 |
| 46 | (United States) Tim Hunt | Suzuki | | | | | | | | | | 24 | 21 | | | | | | | | | | 0 |
| 47 | (United States) Walt Sipp | Buell | | | | | | 24 | 22 | | | | | | | | | | | | | | 0 |
| 48 | (United States) Kevin Boisvert | Suzuki | | | | | | 24 | 23 | | | | | | | | | | | | | | 0 |
| 49 | (United States) David Kunzelman | Suzuki | | | | | | | | | | | | 24 | | | | | | | | | 0 |
| 50 | (United States) David Loikits | Suzuki | 28 | | | | | | | | | | | | | | | | | | | | 0 |
| Pos | Rider | Make | DAY | FON | | RAT | | BAR | | INF | | RAM | | LAG | M-O | | HRT | | VIR | | N-J | | Pts |

| Colour | Result |
|---|---|
| Gold | Winner (1) |
| Silver | 2nd place (2) |
| Bronze | 3rd place (3) |
| Green | Finished, in points (4-20) |
| Blue | Finished, no points (21+) |
| Purple | Did not finish (Ret) |
| Purple | Not classified (NC) |
| Red | Did not qualify (DNQ) |
| Black | Disqualified (DSQ) |
| White | Did not start (DNS) |
| Blank | Did not participate |
| Blank | Withdrawn due to injury (INJ) |
| Blank | Excluded (EX) |
| Blank | Race cancelled (C) |
| **Bold** | **Pole Position** |
| Italics | Lap Leader |

| Pos. | Pts. | Pos. | Pts. |
|---|---|---|---|
| 1 | 36 | 16 | 15 |
| 2 | 32 | 17 | 14 |
| 3 | 29 | 18 | 13 |
| 4 | 27 | 19 | 12 |
| 5 | 26 | 20 | 11 |
| 6 | 25 | 21 | 10 |
| 7 | 24 | 22 | 9 |
| 8 | 23 | 23 | 8 |
| 9 | 22 | 24 | 7 |
| 10 | 21 | 25 | 6 |
| 11 | 20 | 26 | 5 |
| 12 | 19 | 27 | 4 |
| 13 | 18 | 28 | 3 |
| 14 | 17 | 29 | 2 |
| 15 | 16 | 30 | 1 |
1pt for **Pole Position**
1pt for Most Laps Led

== Entry list ==
| Team | Manufacturer | Motorcycle | No | Rider |
|---|---|---|---|---|
| Yamaha Motor Corp. USA | Yamaha | Yamaha YZF-R1 | 2 | (United States) Benjamin Bostrom |
| Yamaha Motor Corp. USA | Yamaha | Yamaha YZF-R1 | 4 | (United States) Joshua Hayes |
| Suzuki/Blackfoot/Picotte Motorsports | Suzuki | Suzuki GSXR1000 | 6 | (Canada) Brett McCormick |
| Rockstar/Makita/Suzuki | Suzuki | Suzuki GSXR1000 | 7 | (Australia) Mat Mladin |
| Rockstar/Makita/Suzuki | Suzuki | Suzuki GSXR1000 | 22 | (United States) Tommy Hayden |
| Rockstar/Makita/Suzuki | Suzuki | Suzuki GSXR1000 | 79 | (United States) Blake Young |
| Celtic Racing | Suzuki | Suzuki GSXR1000 | 8 | (United Kingdom) Michael Laverty |
| Liberty Waves Racing | Suzuki | Suzuki GSXR1000 | 9 | (United States) Eric Haugo |
| Higbee-Racing.com | Buell | Buell 1125R | 11 | (United States) Shawn Higbee |
| Team Hooters Suzuki | Suzuki | Suzuki GSX-R1000 | 12 | (United States) Shane Narbonne |
| Team Hooters Suzuki | Suzuki | Suzuki GSX-R1000 | 21 | (United States) Ryan Elleby |
| Roadracingworld.com/Suzuki | Suzuki | Suzuki GSX-R1000 | 18 | (United States) Chris Ulrich |
| Bettencourts Racing | Suzuki | Suzuki GSX-R1000 | 19 | (United States) Jeff Wood |
| Jordan Suzuki | Suzuki | Suzuki GSX-R1000 | 23 | (United States) Aaron Yates |
| Aussie Dave Racing | Suzuki | Suzuki GSX-R1000 | 25 | (Australia) David Anthony |
| Aussie Dave Racing | Suzuki | Suzuki GSX-R1000 | 121 | (United States) Hawk Mazzotta |
| Four Feathers Racing | Yamaha | Yamaha YZF-R1 | 27 | (United States) Mark Crozier |
| Longevity Racing | Ducati | Ducati 1098R | 29 | (United States) Barrett Long |
| M Racing | Suzuki | Suzuki GSXR1000 | 38 | (United States) Dean Mizdal |
| Greenwood Racing | Suzuki | Suzuki GSXR1000 | 41 | (United States) Scott Greenwood |
| Taylor Knapp Racing | Suzuki | Suzuki GSXR1000 | 44 | (United States) Taylor Knapp |
| SRK Racing | Suzuki | Suzuki GSXR1000 | 45 | (United States) Brad Puetz |
| Team Reno | Suzuki | Suzuki GSXR1000 | 48 | (United States) Reno Karimian |
| National Guard Jordan Suzuki | Suzuki | Suzuki GSXR1000 | 54 | (United States) Geoff May |
| Loikits Industries Racing | Suzuki | Suzuki GSXR1000 | 55 | (United States) David Loikits |
| Moto Garage Racing | Suzuki & Yamaha | Suzuki GSXR1000 & Yamaha YZF-R1 | 58 | (United States) Josh Graham |
| Moto Garage Racing | Suzuki & Yamaha | Suzuki GSXR1000 & Yamaha YZF-R1 | 61 | (United States) Scott Jensen |
| Holden Racing | Honda | Honda CBR1000RR | 59 | (United States) Jake Holden |
| Holden Racing | Honda | Honda CBR1000RR | 59 | (Australia) Aaron Gobert |
| MDK Motorsports | Suzuki | Suzuki GSXR1000 | 62 | (United States) Cory Call |
| Marietta Motorsports | Suzuki | Suzuki GSXR1000 | 63 | (United States) Skip Salenius |
| Bayside Performance | Suzuki | Suzuki GSXR1000 | 68 | (United States) Kevin Boisvert |
| Foremost Insurance/Pegram Racing Ducati | Ducati | Ducati 1098R | 72 | (United States) Larry Pegram |
| TigerTeam Racing | Honda | Honda CBR1000RR | 91 | (United States) Jeffrey Tigert |
| AGR Inc. | Honda | Honda CBR1000RR | 96 | (Australia) Aaron Gobert |
| Corona Extra Honda | Honda | Honda CBR1000RR | 100 | (United Kingdom) Neil Hodgson |
| Corona Extra Honda | Honda | Honda CBR1000RR | 100 | (United States) Jake Holden |
| X Dot Racing | Suzuki | Suzuki GSXR1000 | 102 | (United States) Mark Simon |
| Walt Sipp Racing | Buell | Buell 1125R | 221 | (United States) Charles Sipp |
| 944 Magazine/Energized by Verve!/ JohnnyRockPage.com | Yamaha | Yamaha YZF-R1 | 269 | (United States) Johnny Rock Page |
| AllStoneArmy.com | Honda | Honda CBR1000RR | 270 | (United States) Davie Stone |
| Lee's Cycle Racing | Honda | Honda CBR1000RR | 571 | (United States) Jeremy Toye |
| Nor CO Racing | Ducati | Ducati 1098R | 616 | (United States) Brad Hendry |

Key
Regular Rider
Wildcard Rider
Replacement Rider

- All entries utilize Dunlop tyres.

== See also ==
- 2009 AMA Pro Daytona Sportbike Championship season
