= Blake Young (motorcyclist) =

American motorcycle racer (born 1987)

- Nationality: American
- Born: September 20, 1987 (age 39); Madison, Wisconsin, U.S.
Motorcycle racing career statistics
MotoGP World Championship
Active years	2013
Manufacturers	APR
Championships	0
2013 championship position	NC (0 pts)
Starts / Wins / Podiums / Poles / F. laps / Points; 2 / 0 / 0 / 0 / 0 / 0
Superbike World Championship
Active years	2009, 2013
Manufacturers	Suzuki
Starts / Wins / Podiums / Poles / F. laps / Points; 4 / 0 / 0 / 0 / 0 / 8

Blake Young (born September 20, 1987, in Madison, Wisconsin) is an American motorcycle racer.

== Career statistics ==
=== AMA Formula Xtreme Championship ===
==== By year ====
Year	Class	Bike	1	2	3	4	5	6	7	8	9	10	11	Pos	Pts
2004	Formula Xtreme	Suzuki	DAY	FON	INF	BAR	PPK	RAM; 6	BRD; 7	LAG; 14	M-O; Ret	RAT; 8	VIR; Ret	16th	85
2006	Formula Xtreme	Suzuki	DAY; 9	BAR; 9	FON; 8	INF; 7	RAM; Ret	MIL; 8	LAG; Ret	OHI; 8	VIR; 8	RAT; Ret	OHI; 11	9th	180

=== AMA Supersport Championship ===
==== By year ====
Year	Class	Bike	1	2	3	4	5	6	7	8	9	10	11	Pos	Pts
2004	Supersport	Suzuki	DAY; 21	FON	INF	BAR; 14	PPK	RAM; 11	BRD; 15	LAG; 14	M-O; Ret	RAT; 14	VIR; 11	18th	117
2005	Supersport	Suzuki	DAY; 16	BAR; 15	FON; Ret	INF; 14	PPK; 15	RAM; 11	LAG; 10	M-O; 12	VIR; 10	RAT; 10		11th	166
2006	Supersport	Suzuki	DAY; 13	BAR; 9	FON; 7	INF; C	RAM; 9	MIL; 8	LAG; 8	OHI; 8	VIR; 6	RAT; 7	OHI; 8	7th	227
2007	Supersport	Suzuki	DAY; 14	BAR; 9	FON; 11	INF; 13	RAM; 5	MIL; 11	LAG; 8	OHI	VIR; 15	RAT; 6	LAG; 6	6th	212

=== AMA Superstock Championship ===
==== By year ====
Year	Class	Bike	1	2	3	4	5	6	7	8	9	10	11	Pos	Pts
2005	Superstock	Suzuki	DAY; 15	BAR; 19	FON; 12	INF; 16	PPK; 16	RAM; 15	LAG; 16	M-O; Ret	VIR; 13	RAT; 15		15th	142
2007	Superstock	Suzuki	DAY; 7	BAR; 6	FON; 9	INF; 5	RAM; 10	MIL; Ret	LAG	OHI	VIR; 5	RAT; 6	LAG; 6	8th	194

=== AMA Superbike Championship ===
Year	Class	Team	1		2		3		4		5		6		7	8		9		10		11		Pos	Pts
Year	Class	Team	R1	R2	R1	R2	R1	R2	R1	R2	R1	R2	R1	R2	R1	R1	R2	R1	R2	R1	R2	R1	R2	Pos	Pts
2008	SuperBike	Suzuki	DAY; 9		BAR	BAR	FON	FON	INF	INF	MIL	MIL	RAM	RAM	LAG	OHI	OHI	VIR	VIR	RAT	RAT	LAG		32nd	23
2009	SuperBike	Suzuki	DAY; 5		FON; 4	FON; 9	RAT; 4	RAT; 2	BAR; 2	BAR; 25	INF	INF	RAM; 5	RAM; 8	LAG; 2	OHI; 7	OHI; 4	HRT; 3	HRT; 8	VIR; 6	VIR; 7	NJE; 7	NJE; 9	6th	290
2010	SuperBike	Suzuki	DAY; 5	DAY; 7	FON; 5	FON; 3	RAT; 1	RAT; 1	INF; 5	INF; 5	RAM; 3	RAM; 7	MOH	MOH	LAG	VIR	VIR	NJE; 4	NJE; 4	BAR; 4	BAR; 1			6th	283
2011	SuperBike	Suzuki	DAY; 1	DAY; 1	INF; 4	INF; 3	UTA; 1		RAM; 1	RAM; 3	BAR; 3	BAR; 1	MOH; 1	MOH; 2	LAG; 3	NJE; 5	NJE; 1							2nd	358

=== Grand Prix motorcycle racing ===
==== By season ====
Season	Class	Motorcycle	Team	Race	Win	Podium	Pole	FLap	Pts	Plcd
2013	MotoGP	APR	Attack Performance Racing	2	0	0	0	0	0	NC
Total				**2**	**0**	**0**	**0**	**0**	**0**	

==== Races by year ====
(key)

Year	Class	Bike	1	2	3	4	5	6	7	8	9	10	11	12	13	14	15	16	17	18	Pos	Pts
2013	MotoGP	APR	QAT	AME; 21	SPA	FRA	ITA	CAT	NED	GER	USA; WD	INP; Ret	CZE	GBR	RSM	ARA	MAL	AUS	JPN	VAL	NC	0

=== Superbike World Championship ===
==== Races by year ====
(key) (Races in bold indicate pole position) (Races in italics indicate fastest lap)

Year	Make	1		2		3		4		5		6		7		8		9		10		11		12		13		14		Pos.	Pts
Year	Make	R1	R2	R1	R2	R1	R2	R1	R2	R1	R2	R1	R2	R1	R2	R1	R2	R1	R2	R1	R2	R1	R2	R1	R2	R1	R2	R1	R2	Pos.	Pts
2009	Suzuki	AUS	AUS	QAT	QAT	SPA	SPA	NED	NED	ITA	ITA	RSA	RSA	USA; 25	USA; 17	SMR	SMR	GBR	GBR	CZE	CZE	GER	GER	ITA	ITA	FRA	FRA	POR	POR	NC	0
2013	Suzuki	AUS	AUS	SPA	SPA	NED	NED	ITA	ITA	GBR	GBR	POR	POR	ITA	ITA	RUS	RUS	GBR	GBR	GER	GER	TUR	TUR	USA; 12	USA; 12	FRA	FRA	SPA	SPA	29th	8
