= 2011 Valencian Community motorcycle Grand Prix =

2011 Valencian Community Grand Prix
Race details
- Race 18 of 18 races in the 2011 Grand Prix motorcycle racing season
- Date: 6 November 2011
- Official name: Gran Premio Generali de la Comunitat Valenciana
- Location: Circuit Ricardo Tormo
- Course: Permanent racing facility; 4.005 km (2.489 mi)

MotoGP
Pole position
Rider	(Australia) Casey Stoner	Honda
Time	1:31.861	
Fastest lap
Rider	(Italy) Andrea Dovizioso	Honda
Time	1:34.167	
Podium
First	(Australia) Casey Stoner	Honda
Second	(United States) Ben Spies	Yamaha
Third	(Italy) Andrea Dovizioso	Honda

Moto2
Pole position
Rider	(Italy) Michele Pirro	Moriwaki
Time	1:37.067	
Fastest lap
Rider	(Italy) Andrea Iannone	Suter
Time	1:39.730	
Podium
First	(Italy) Michele Pirro	Moriwaki
Second	(Finland) Mika Kallio	Suter
Third	(Switzerland) Dominique Aegerter	Suter

125cc
Pole position
Rider	(United Kingdom) Danny Webb	Mahindra
Time	1:45.898	
Fastest lap
Rider	(Spain) Maverick Viñales	Aprilia
Time	1:42.882	
Podium
First	(Spain) Maverick Viñales	Aprilia
Second	(Spain) Nicolás Terol	Aprilia
Third	(Spain) Héctor Faubel	Aprilia

The 2011 Valencian Community motorcycle Grand Prix was the last round of the 2011 Grand Prix motorcycle racing season. It took place on the weekend of 4–6 November 2011 at the Circuito Ricardo Tormo. It was the first race after the death of Marco Simoncelli in Sepang. It was the final race for the current formula in the premier (MotoGP) and lightweight classes (now known as Moto3). In the premier class, the 800cc engines would be replaced by 1000cc engines. Honda also would change motorcycles at the end of the season, as the Honda RC212V that débuted at the 2007 Qatar Grand Prix would be replaced by the RC213V for the following season. In the lightweight class, the 125cc two-stroke motorcycle formula would be replaced by 250cc four-strokes for 2012. This was also the final race for Suzuki as a factory team until their return in 2015.

On Saturday, Stefan Bradl officially became Moto2 World Champion after his only rival, Marc Márquez, could not go on the track during the free practices and the qualifying session, because of injuries sustained in Malaysia.

== MotoGP classification ==
Colin Edwards had an injured shoulder and was replaced by 2011 AMA Pro Superbike champion Josh Hayes on the Yamaha Tech 3 and Jorge Lorenzo was replaced for the second time by test-rider Katsuyuki Nakasuga. Loris Capirossi retired from motorcycle racing following the race.

Although Gresini Racing originally pulled out of the Valencia race after Simoncelli's fatal accident, it was later decided that the team would race. As tribute to Marco Simoncelli, Loris Capirossi, in his final MotoGP race, participated wearing Simoncelli's racing number 58 instead of his usual racing number 65, although on the official reports he was still listed as #65. All riders from MotoGP, Moto2 and the 125cc races participated in a parade lap on Sunday morning after the warm-up session with 1993 500cc World Champion Kevin Schwantz riding Simoncelli's bike. Valentino Rossi wore a tribute helmet.

The finish was one of the tightest in MotoGP history as already crowned World Champion Casey Stoner came from a long way back on acceleration out of the last corner to leapfrog Ben Spies at the finish line by just 0.015 seconds.

Pos.	No.	Rider	Team	Manufacturer	Laps	Time/Retired	Grid	Points
1	27	(Australia) Casey Stoner	Repsol Honda Team	Honda	30	48:18.645	1	25
2	11	(United States) Ben Spies	Yamaha Factory Racing	Yamaha	30	+0.015	3	20
3	4	(Italy) Andrea Dovizioso	Repsol Honda Team	Honda	30	+5.936	8	16
4	35	(United Kingdom) Cal Crutchlow	Monster Yamaha Tech 3	Yamaha	30	+8.718	11	13
5	26	(Spain) Dani Pedrosa	Repsol Honda Team	Honda	30	+9.321	2	11
6	89	(Japan) Katsuyuki Nakasuga	Yamaha Factory Racing	Yamaha	30	+23.818	15	10
7	41	(United States) Josh Hayes	Monster Yamaha Tech 3	Yamaha	30	+33.118	16	9
8	17	(Czech Republic) Karel Abraham	Cardion AB Motoracing	Ducati	30	+37.952	10	8
9	58 (Note: Although officially listed as No. 65, the motorcycle carried No. 58 in memory of Marco Simoncelli.)	(Italy) Loris Capirossi	Pramac Racing Team	Ducati	30	+48.953	12	7
10	24	(Spain) Toni Elías	LCR Honda MotoGP	Honda	30	+52.501	13	6
11	8	(Spain) Héctor Barberá	Mapfre Aspar Team MotoGP	Ducati	30	+1:06.519	9	5
12	7	(Japan) Hiroshi Aoyama	San Carlo Honda Gresini	Honda	30	+1:08.760	14	4
Ret	14	(France) Randy de Puniet	Pramac Racing Team	Ducati	0	Collision	4	
Ret	19	(Spain) Álvaro Bautista	Rizla Suzuki MotoGP	Suzuki	0	Collision	5	
Ret	46	(Italy) Valentino Rossi	Ducati Team	Ducati	0	Collision	6	
Ret	69	(United States) Nicky Hayden	Ducati Team	Ducati	0	Collision	7	

== Moto2 classification ==
Pos.	No.	Rider	Manufacturer	Laps	Time/Retired	Grid	Points
1	51	(Italy) Michele Pirro	Moriwaki	27	46:22.205	1	25
2	36	(Finland) Mika Kallio	Suter	27	+6.150	3	20
3	77	(Switzerland) Dominique Aegerter	Suter	27	+6.363	7	16
4	13	(Australia) Anthony West	MZ-RE Honda	27	+8.843	22	13
5	9	(United States) Kenny Noyes	FTR	27	+9.229	23	11
6	68	(Colombia) Yonny Hernández	FTR	27	+9.926	20	10
7	63	(France) Mike Di Meglio	Tech 3	27	+10.115	9	9
8	19	(Belgium) Xavier Siméon	Tech 3	27	+10.385	8	8
9	76	(Germany) Max Neukirchner	MZ-RE Honda	27	+13.018	24	7
10	60	(Spain) Julián Simón	Suter	27	+13.685	21	6
11	29	(Italy) Andrea Iannone	Suter	27	+14.686	25	5
12	15	(San Marino) Alex de Angelis	Motobi	27	+15.200	5	4
13	16	(France) Jules Cluzel	Suter	27	+18.428	19	3
14	44	(Spain) Pol Espargaró	FTR	27	+19.177	13	2
15	71	(Italy) Claudio Corti	Suter	27	+20.356	26	1
16	4	(Switzerland) Randy Krummenacher	Kalex	27	+26.031	27	
17	12	(Switzerland) Thomas Lüthi	Suter	27	+27.160	6	
18	18	(Spain) Jordi Torres	Suter	27	+33.813	15	
19	25	(Italy) Alex Baldolini	Moriwaki	27	+46.003	18	
20	54	(Turkey) Kenan Sofuoğlu	Suter	27	+49.635	29	
21	40	(Spain) Aleix Espargaró	Pons Kalex	27	+1:12.187	11	
22	64	(Colombia) Santiago Hernández	FTR	27	+1:14.567	31	
23	38	(United Kingdom) Bradley Smith	Tech 3	27	+1:15.394	12	
24	39	(Venezuela) Robertino Pietri	Suter	27	+1:16.767	33	
25	82	(Spain) Elena Rosell	Suter	27	+1:19.893	35	
26	6	(Spain) Joan Olivé	FTR	27	+1:22.339	32	
27	95	(Qatar) Mashel Al Naimi	Moriwaki	26	+1 lap	37	
28	61	(Spain) Óscar Climent	MIR Racing	26	+1 lap	34	
29	96	(Qatar) Nasser Al Malki	Moriwaki	26	+1 lap	38	
30	45	(United Kingdom) Scott Redding	Suter	26	+1 lap	14	
Ret	35	(Italy) Raffaele de Rosa	Suter	25	Accident	28	
Ret	3	(Italy) Simone Corsi	FTR	25	Retirement	10	
Ret	53	(France) Valentin Debise	FTR	20	Retirement	30	
Ret	14	(Thailand) Ratthapark Wilairot	FTR	13	Retirement	36	
Ret	75	(Italy) Mattia Pasini	FTR	10	Accident	17	
Ret	34	(Spain) Esteve Rabat	FTR	6	Retirement	16	
Ret	72	(Japan) Yuki Takahashi	Moriwaki	5	Accident	2	
Ret	65	(Germany) Stefan Bradl	Kalex	4	Accident	4	
DNS	80	(Spain) Axel Pons	Pons Kalex		Did not start		
WD	93	(Spain) Marc Márquez	Suter		Withdrew		
OFFICIAL MOTO2 REPORT

== 125 cc classification ==
Pos.	No.	Rider	Manufacturer	Laps	Time/Retired	Grid	Points
1	25	(Spain) Maverick Viñales	Aprilia	24	41:44.138	8	25
2	18	(Spain) Nicolás Terol	Aprilia	24	+3.216	9	20
3	55	(Spain) Héctor Faubel	Aprilia	24	+7.460	6	16
4	7	(Spain) Efrén Vázquez	Derbi	24	+14.560	13	13
5	94	(Germany) Jonas Folger	Aprilia	24	+18.451	10	11
6	23	(Spain) Alberto Moncayo	Aprilia	24	+36.472	14	10
7	39	(Spain) Luis Salom	Aprilia	24	+52.614	4	9
8	31	(Finland) Niklas Ajo	Aprilia	24	+1:00.138	19	8
9	3	(Italy) Luigi Morciano	Aprilia	24	+1:00.253	22	7
10	96	(France) Louis Rossi	Aprilia	24	+1:03.258	2	6
11	60	(Italy) Manuel Tatasciore	Aprilia	24	+1:09.892	20	5
12	77	(Germany) Marcel Schrötter	Mahindra	24	+1:12.741	23	4
13	19	(Italy) Alessandro Tonucci	Aprilia	24	+1:18.337	17	3
14	71	(United Kingdom) John McPhee	Aprilia	24	+1:18.434	25	2
15	30	(Switzerland) Giulian Pedone	Aprilia	24	+1:20.580	30	1
16	50	(Norway) Sturla Fagerhaug	Aprilia	24	+1:21.155	21	
17	52	(United Kingdom) Danny Kent	Aprilia	24	+1:27.770	18	
18	56	(Hungary) Péter Sebestyén	Aprilia	24	+1:33.406	28	
19	34	(Spain) Daniel Ruiz	Honda	24	+1:34.593	31	
20	53	(Netherlands) Jasper Iwema	Aprilia	24	+1:34.832	27	
21	40	(Switzerland) Marco Colandrea	Aprilia	23	+1 lap	33	
22	10	(France) Alexis Masbou	KTM	23	+1 lap	5	
23	86	(Germany) Kevin Hanus	Honda	23	+1 lap	32	
24	84	(Czech Republic) Jakub Kornfeil	Aprilia	23	+1 lap	24	
25	63	(Malaysia) Zulfahmi Khairuddin	Derbi	21	+3 laps	15	
NC	26	(Spain) Adrián Martín	Aprilia	24	+2:16.952	11	
Ret	17	(United Kingdom) Taylor Mackenzie	Aprilia	18	Accident	26	
Ret	14	(South Africa) Brad Binder	Aprilia	17	Accident	34	
Ret	28	(Spain) Josep Rodríguez	Aprilia	15	Retirement	16	
Ret	11	(Germany) Sandro Cortese	Aprilia	11	Accident	7	
Ret	99	(United Kingdom) Danny Webb	Mahindra	11	Accident	1	
Ret	21	(United Kingdom) Harry Stafford	Aprilia	7	Retirement	29	
Ret	8	(Australia) Jack Miller	KTM	3	Retirement	12	
Ret	5	(France) Johann Zarco	Derbi	2	Accident	3	
DNS	13	(Spain) Juan Francisco Guevara	Aprilia		Did not start		
DNQ	22	(Denmark) Emil Petersen	Honda		Did not qualify		
OFFICIAL 125cc REPORT

== Championship standings after the race (MotoGP) ==
Below are the standings for the top five riders and constructors after round eighteen has concluded.

Riders' Championship standings

Pos.	Rider	Points
1	(Australia) Casey Stoner	350
2	(Spain) Jorge Lorenzo	260
3	(Italy) Andrea Dovizioso	228
4	(Spain) Dani Pedrosa	219
5	(United States) Ben Spies	176

Constructors' Championship standings

Pos.	Constructor	Points
1	(Japan) Honda	405
2	(Japan) Yamaha	325
3	(Italy) Ducati	180
4	(Japan) Suzuki	73

- Note: Only the top five positions are included for both sets of standings.

== Notes ==
Previous race: 2011 Malaysian Grand Prix	FIM Grand Prix World Championship; 2011 season	Next race: 2012 Qatar Grand Prix
Previous race: 2010 Valencian Grand Prix	Valencian Community motorcycle Grand Prix	Next race: 2012 Valencian Grand Prix
