= Josh Hayes (motorcyclist) =

American motorcycle racer (born 1975)

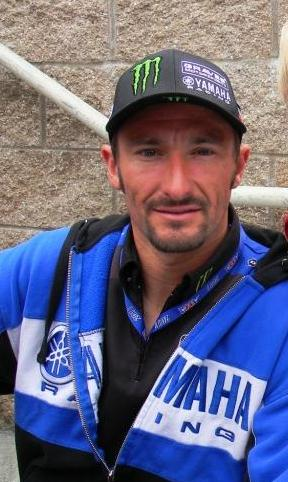
- Hayes at Infineon Raceway in 2011
- Born: April 4, 1975 (age 51); Gulfport, Mississippi, United States
- Current team: Monster Energy/Yamalube/Yamaha Factory Racing
- Bike number: 4
- Website: JoshHayesRacing.com
Motorcycle racing career statistics
MotoGP World Championship
Active years	2011
Manufacturers	Yamaha
Championships	0
2011 championship position	19th (9 pts)
Starts / Wins / Podiums / Poles / F. laps / Points; 1 / 0 / 0 / 0 / 0 / 9
AMA Superbike Championship / MotoAmerica
Active years	2003–2005, 2009–
Manufacturers	Suzuki, Kawasaki, Yamaha
Championships	4 (2010, 2011, 2012, 2014)
Starts / Wins / Podiums / Poles / F. laps / Points; 197 / 61 / 0 / 41 / 0 / 0

Joshua Kurt Hayes (born April 4, 1975 in Gulfport, Mississippi) is an American professional motorcycle roadracer who started his road racing career at the age of 19 and made a quick ascension up through the ranks where he won his first three WERA titles in 1994 and numerous others in the following four years. He turned pro in 1996 and also raced in MotoGP. Riding Suzuki GSX-R motorcycles, Hayes won the 1999 750 SuperSport race at Daytona and finished third in the Formula Extreme class for the season. He won the 2003 AMA 750 SuperStock Championship riding an Attack Suzuki GSX-R750, the 2006 and the 2007 AMA Formula Xtreme Championships on an Erion Honda CBR600RR, and four AMA Superbike Championships on a Yamaha YZF-R1 (2010, 2011, 2012, and 2014).

== Career ==
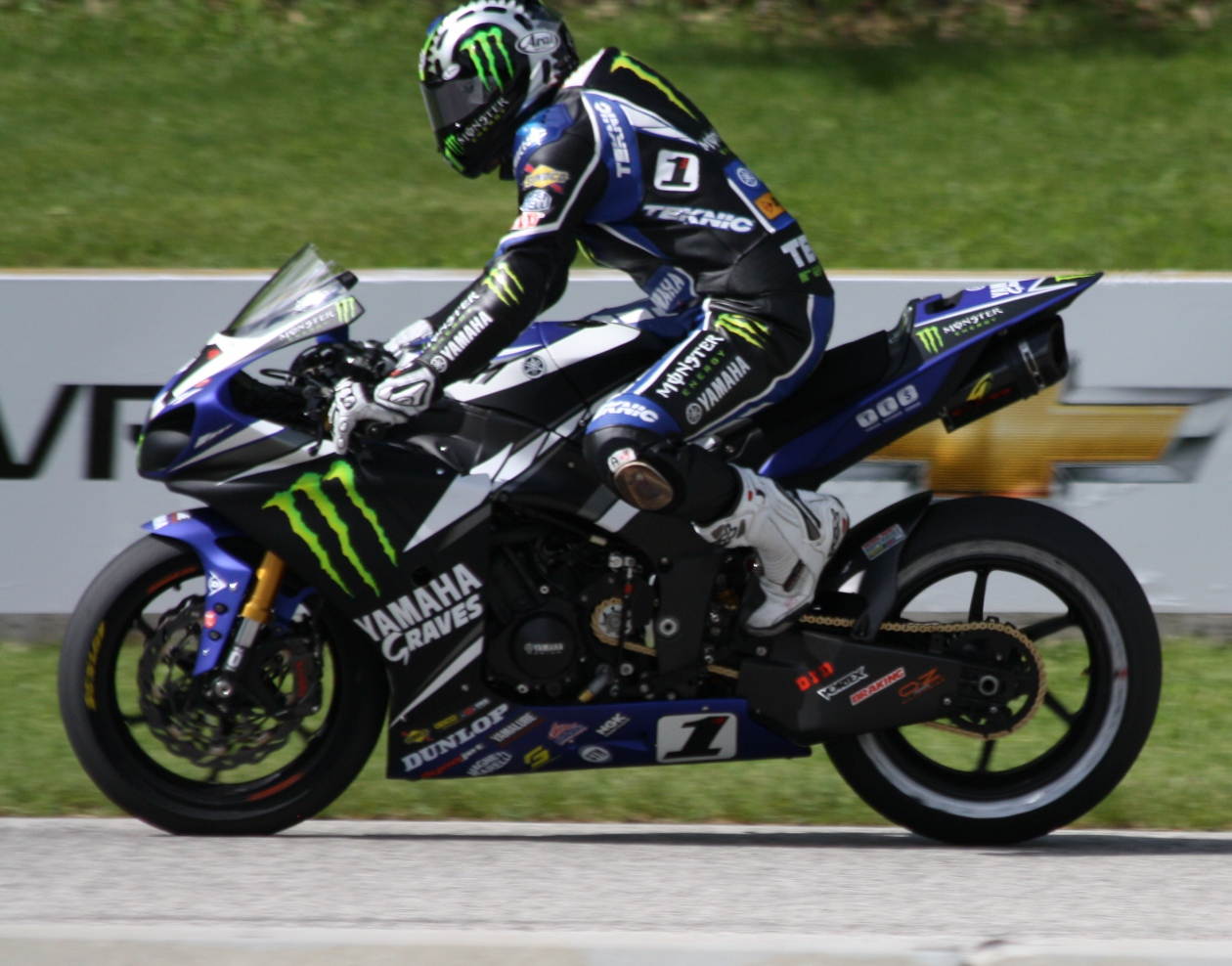
Hayes racing in 2013

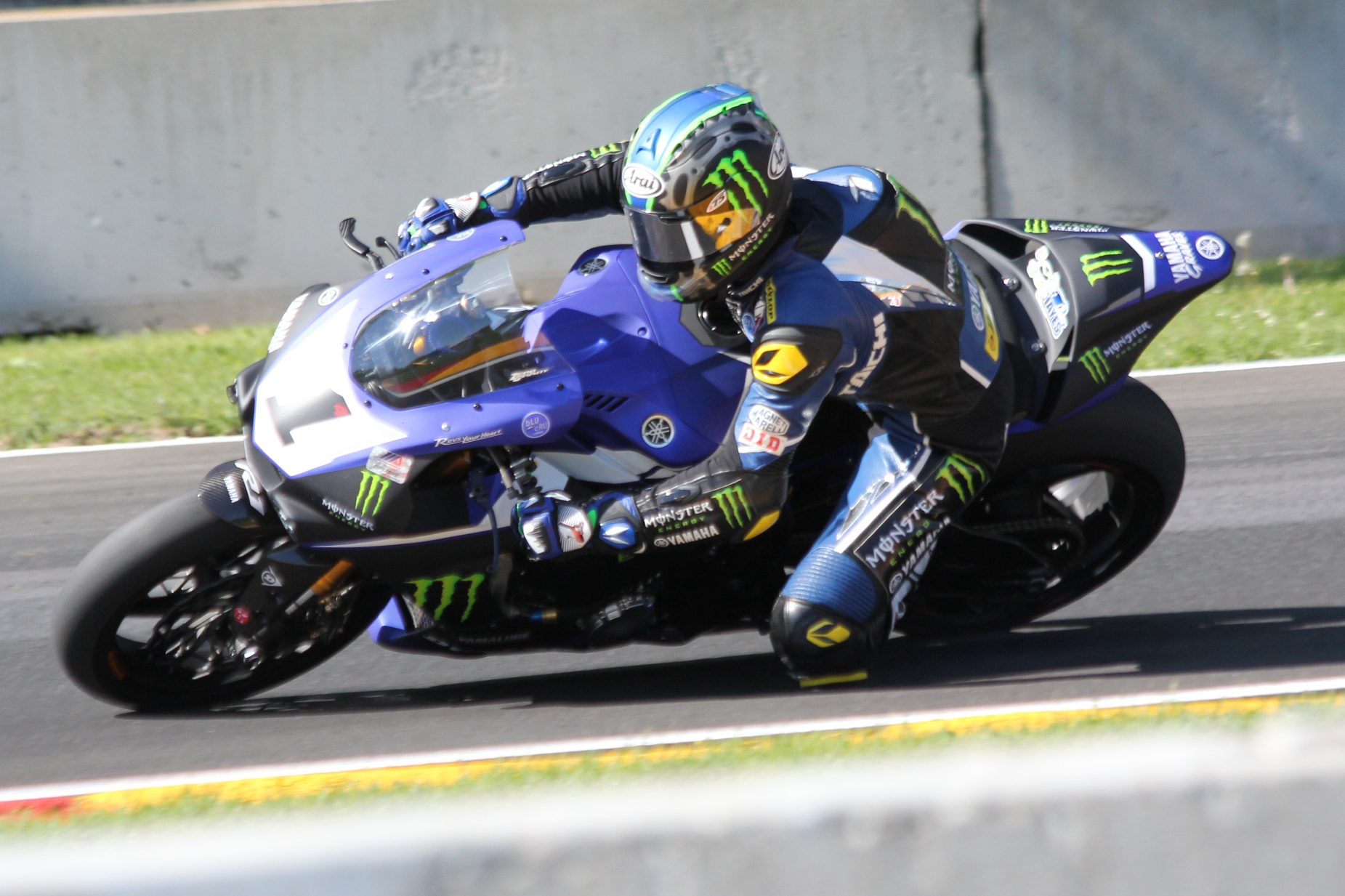
Hayes leaning left at Road America, 2015

Hayes joined the Yamaha Factory Racing team in 2009 and competed aboard a Yamaha YZF-R1 in the AMA Pro Racing SuperBike Championship, winning seven races en route to second place in the Championship. He also raced a Yamaha YZF-R6 in the Daytona 200.

The 2010 season saw Hayes fulfill his lifelong goal of becoming AMA Pro SuperBike Champion. In the process, he also won Yamaha's first SuperBike title in 19 years, scoring seven race victories and earning multiple bonus points for pole positions and laps led on the season.

Hayes won his second consecutive SuperBike Championship in 2011. He captured seven poles, three wins, and nine podium finishes in defending his championship. He only finished off the podium twice over the course of the entire season, and he won the Championship on the final lap of the final race.

Hayes made his MotoGP debut at the 2011 Valencian Grand Prix riding the Tech 3 Yamaha YZR-M1 as a replacement rider for injured countryman Colin Edwards. Hayes led the wet morning warmup session, and then, he went on to finish seventh in the race.

In 2012, Hayes won his third consecutive SuperBike Championship, and he did it in record-setting fashion, rewriting AMA Pro Road Racing history in several categories. He set a new record for most SuperBike wins in a single season with 16, and he also set a new record for most consecutive SuperBike wins in a single season with ten. In addition, Hayes tied the record for most SuperBike poles in a single season with ten, and he had seven perfect weekends. In seven rounds during the 2012 season, Hayes qualified his #1 Monster Energy/Graves/Yamaha R1 SuperBike in the pole position, won both SuperBike races, and also led the most laps in both races.

Finishing a close second in the 2013 AMA Pro SuperBike points standings to his Monster Energy/Graves/Yamaha teammate and 2013 SuperBike Champion Josh Herrin, Hayes won eight races and earned two additional podiums. He also had a season sweep in qualifying, earning all eight SuperBike pole positions, and he set a new lap record at New Jersey Motorsports Park.

Hayes showed in 2014 that the #4 on his Monster Energy/Graves/Yamaha R1 SuperBike was an omen. On the strength of his seven race wins and three second-place finishes out of 11 races this season, Hayes captured his fourth AMA Pro SuperBike Championship. He also won the GEICO Motorcycle Superbike Shootout Championship that same year.

In 2015, Hayes notched ten Superbike wins during MotoAmerica's inaugural season. He also reached the podium in 16 out of 18 races and earned five pole positions. His teammate Cameron Beaubier nipped him by just four points for the 2015 MotoAmerica Superbike title.

In 2016, Hayes finished the MotoAmerica season just six points behind his teammate Beaubier, and it came down to the final race of the season at New Jersey Motorsports Park to decide it all.

Hayes finished fourth in the 2017 MotoAmerica Championship, reaching the podium eight times, which included a victory at VIRginia International Raceway.

On July 29, 2023 at Brainerd International Raceway, at the age of 48, Hayes secured his 87th career MotoAmerica/AMA race win, giving him the all-time record for the most wins across all MotoAmerica/AMA Pro roadracing classes.

== Career statistics ==
=== FIM Endurance World Championship ===
==== By team ====
Year	Team	Bike	Rider	TC
2004	(United Kingdom) Suzuki GB - Phase One	Suzuki GSX-R1000	(United Kingdom) James Ellison (United States) Jason Pridmore (United Kingdom) Andy Notman (United Kingdom) Dean Ellison (United States) Josh Hayes (France) Olivier Four (Sweden) Jimmy Lindstrom	1st
2013	Yamaha Austria Racing Team	Yamaha YZF-R1	(Australia) Broc Parkes (Slovenia) Igor Jerman (South Africa) Sheridan Morais (Australia) Josh Waters (Japan) Katsuyuki Nakasuga (United States) Josh Hayes	5th
2017	Yamaha Austria Racing Team	Yamaha YZF-R1	(United States) Josh Hayes (Australia) Broc Parkes (Spain) Iván Silva (Japan) Kohta Nozane (South Africa) Sheridan Morais	3rd

=== Grand Prix motorcycle racing ===
==== By season ====
Year	Class	Motorcycle	Team	Number	Race	Win	Podium	Pole	FLap	Pts	Plcd
2011	MotoGP	Yamaha YZR-M1	Monster Yamaha Tech 3	41	1	0	0	0	0	9	19th
Total					**1**	**0**	**0**	**0**	**0**	**9**	

==== Races by year ====
(key) (Races in bold indicate pole position) (Races in italics indicate fastest lap)

Year	Class	Bike	1	2	3	4	5	6	7	8	9	10	11	12	13	14	15	16	17	18	Pos	Pts
2011	MotoGP	Yamaha	QAT	SPA	POR	FRA	CAT	GBR	NED	ITA	GER	USA	CZE	IND	RSM	ARA	JPN	AUS	MAL	VAL; 7	19th	9

=== AMA Superbike ===
(key) (Races in bold indicate pole position) (Races in italics indicate fastest lap)

Year	Team	Bike	1		2		3		4		5		6		7		8		9		10		11		Pos	Pts
Year	Team	Bike	R1	R2	R1	R2	R1	R2	R1	R2	R1	R2	R1	R2	R1	R2	R1	R2	R1	R2	R1	R2	R1	R2	Pos	Pts
2003	Attack Performance	Suzuki GSX-R750 Suzuki GSX-R1000	DAY; DNS		FON; DNQ	FON	INF	INF	ATL; DNS	ATL; DNS	PPK; DNS		RAM; 36	RAM; DNS	BRD; DNS		LGA; 36		MDO; DNS	MDO; DNS	VIR	VIR	BAR	BAR	92nd	0
2004	Attack Performance	Kawasaki ZX-10R	DAY; DNF		FON; 21	FON; 29	INF; 6	INF; 7	BAR; 5	BAR; 6	PPK; 7		RAM; DNF	RAM; DNF	BRD; 6		LGA; 6		MDO; 6	MDO; 5	ATL; 27	ATL; 5	VIR; 7	VIR; 6	8th	316
2005	Attack Performance	Kawasaki ZX-10R	DAY; DNF		BAR; 39	BAR; 6	FON; 7	FON; DNF	INF; 5	INF; 8	PPK; 5		RAM; 3	RAM; 6	LGA; DNF		MDO; 5	MDO; DNF	VIR; 7	VIR; 6	ATL; 6	ATL; 6			9th	302
2009	Yamaha Motor Corp. USA	Yamaha YZF-R1	DAY; 8		FON; 6	FON; 6	ATL; 5	ATL; 4	BAR; 5	BAR; 4	INF; 1	INF; 4	RAM; 17	RAM; 25	LGA; 4		MDO; **1**	MDO; **1**	HPT; 6	HPT; 3	VIR; **1**	VIR; **1**	NJ; **1**	NJ; **1**	2nd	406
2010	Team Graves Yamaha	Yamaha YZF-R1	DAY; 13	DAY; 6	FON; 4	FON; 2	ATL; 6	ATL; 2	INF; **1**	INF; 1	RAM; **1**	RAM; 2	MDO; **1**	MDO; 2	LGA; 2		VIR; 3	VIR; 1	NJ; 1	NJ; 1	BAR; 2	BAR; 7			1st	466
2011	Monster Graves Yamaha	Yamaha YZF-R1	DAY; 3	DAY; **2**	INF; 1	INF; **2**	MIL; 2		RAM; **2**	RAM; 1	BAR; 4	BAR; 2	MDO; 2	MDO; 4	LGA; 2		NJ; 1	NJ; 2							1st	363
2012	Monster Energy Graves Yamaha	Yamaha YZF-R1	DAY; **1**	DAY; 2	ATL; **2**	ATL; 1	INF; **1**	INF; 7	MIL; **1**		RAM; **1**	RAM; 1	BAR; **1**	BAR; 1	MDO; **1**	MDO; 1	LGA; **1**		NJ; **1**	NJ; **1**	HOM; 12	HOM; 1	NOL; **1**	NOL; 1	1st	580

=== MotoAmerica Superstock Championship ===
==== By year ====
Year	Class	Bike	1	2	3	4	5	6	7	8	9	10	11	Pos	Pts
2004	Superstock	Yamaha	DAY; 7	FON; 30	INF; 8	BAR; 5	PPK; Ret	RAM; 2	BRD; 2	LAG; 4	M-O; 5	RAT; 11	VIR; 8	8th	235
2006	Superstock	Honda	DAY; 5	BAR; 5	FON; 8	INF; 8	RAM; 5	MIL; 7	LAG; 10	OHI; 8	VIR; 5	RAT; 4	OHI; 5	5th	271

=== AMA Formula Xtreme Championship ===
==== By year ====
Year	Class	Bike	1	2	3	4	5	6	7	8	9	10	11	Pos	Pts
2006	Formula Xtreme	Honda	DAY; 2	BAR; 2	FON; 3	INF; 4	RAM; 2	MIL; 1	LAG; 3	OHI; 2	VIR; 2	RAT; 1	OHI; 1	1st	358
2007	Formula Xtreme	Honda	DAY; 6	BAR; 1	FON; 1	INF; 1	RAM; 1	MIL; 2	LAG	OHI; 1	VIR; 1	RAT; 1	LAG	1st	324

=== MotoAmerica Supersport Championship ===
==== Races by year ====
Year	Class	Bike	1	2	3	4	5	6	7	8	9	10	11	12	13	14	15	16	17	18	Pos	Pts
2007	Supersport	Honda	DAY; 5	BAR; 1	FON; 2	INF; 1	RAM; 4	MIL; 7	LAG; Ret	OHI	VIR; 1	RAT; 1	LAG; Ret								3rd	260
2022	Superstock	Yamaha	ATL	ATL	VIR; 1	VIR; 2	RAM	RAM	RID	RID	MON	MON	BRA; 3	BRA; 3	PIT; 5	PIT; 6	NJR; 1	NJR; 1	ALA	ALA	6th	148
2025	Supersport	Yamaha	ALA; 10	ALA; 1	ATL; 9	ATL; 7	RAM; 10	RAM; 15	RID; 9	RID; Ret	MON; 8	MON; 8	VIR; 5	VIR; 6	MID	MID	TEX	TEX	NJR	NJR	7th*	98*

Season	Bike	Round																Plcd.	Pts.
2023	Yamaha Motor Company	RAT (Georgia (U.S. state))		ALA (Alabama)	RAM (Wisconsin)		RID (Washington (state))		MON (California)	BRA (Minnesota)		PIT (Pennsylvania)		AME (Texas)		NJE (New Jersey)		Plcd.	Pts.
2023	Yamaha Motor Company	R1	R2	EXT	R1	R2	R1	R2	EXT	R1	R2	R1	R2	R1	R2	R1	R2	Plcd.	Pts.
2023	Yamaha Motor Company	3	3	5	3	4	2	Ret	2	1	2	6	5	21	5	5	1	3rd	256
