= Shawn Higbee =

American motorcycle racer (born 1970)

- Born: 1970 (age 55–56); Jamestown, New York, U.S.

Shawn Higbee (born 1970) is an American professional motorcycle racer in the AMA Daytona and Superbike Series. He also races with the Willow Springs Motorcycle Club (Rosamond, California).

Currently riding as a privateer (a self-financed racer), Higbee rides both the Daytona and Superbike classes on the same, near-stock Buell 1125R.

== Racing accomplishments ==
1994 - AMA Harley-Davidson Twinsport Champion

1996 - 4th in AMA Superbike at Pomona, CA

1997- NASB Buell Lightning Champion, 3rd in Macau International GP

2001 Formula USA Unlimited Superbike Champion

2003 - 6th in AMA Superbike series.

== Career statistics ==
=== MotoAmerica SuperBike Championship ===
==== By year ====
Year	Class	Team	1		2		3		4		5		6		7	8		9		10		11		Pos	Pts
Year	Class	Team	R1	R2	R1	R2	R1	R2	R1	R2	R1	R2	R1	R2	R1	R1	R2	R1	R2	R1	R2	R1	R2	Pos	Pts
2004	SuperBike	Suzuki	DAY	FON; Ret	FON; 30	INF; Ret	INF; 10	BAR; 10	BAR; 11	PPK; 8		RAM; 9	RAM; 13	BRD; 19	LAG; 14		M-O; 11	M-O; 12	RAT; 9	RAT; 11	VIR; 11	VIR; 24		11th	263
2009	SuperBike	Buell	DAY; 25	FON; 18	FON; 15	RAT	RAT	BAR; 20	BAR; 19	INF	INF	RAM; 18	RAM; 15	LAG; 20	OHI; 18	OHI; 15	HRT; 14	HRT; 13	VIR; 18	VIR; 16	NJE; 18	NJE; 17		18th	61
2010	SuperBike	Buell/Ducati	DAY; 8	DAY; Ret	FON; 11	FON; 12	RAT	RAT	INF	INF	RAM	RAM	MOH	MOH	LAG	VIR	VIR	NJE	NJE	BAR	BAR			26th	32

=== MotoAmerica Superstock Championship ===
==== By year ====
Year	Class	Bike	1	2	3	4	5	6	7	8	9	10	11	Pos	Pts
2004	Superstock	Suzuki	DAY; 11	FON; 12	INF; 14	BAR	PPK	RAM	BRD	LAG	M-O	RAT	VIR	22nd	56
