= 2010 AMA Pro American Superbike Championship =

2010 AMA Pro Am Superbike Championship

Seasons
- ← 2009 2011 →

The 2010 AMA Pro American Superbike Championship was the 35th running of the AMA Superbike Championship, an American motorcycle racing championship. Title sponsors for the series include Sunoco, Amsoil, National Guard, Dunlop, Speedcom and SunTrust.

Josh Hayes won his first championship, becoming the first champion riding a Yamaha since 1991.

== Superbike Season Calendar ==
| No | | Round/Circuit | Date | Pole position | Fastest lap | Winner |
|---|---|---|---|---|---|---|
| 1 | R1 | (Florida) Daytona International Speedway | March 3–5 | (United States) Aaron Yates | (United States) Blake Young | (United States) Jake Zemke |
| 1 | R2 | (Florida) Daytona International Speedway | March 3–5 | (United States) Aaron Yates | (United States) Ben Bostrom | (United States) Jake Zemke |
| 2 | R1 | (California) Auto Club Speedway | March 26–28 | (United States) Aaron Yates | (United States) Josh Hayes | (United States) Larry Pegram |
| 2 | R2 | (California) Auto Club Speedway | March 26–28 | (United States) Aaron Yates | (United States) Blake Young | (United States) Tommy Hayden |
| 3 | R1 | (Georgia (U.S. state)) Road Atlanta | April 16–18 | (United States) Blake Young | (United States) Blake Young | (United States) Blake Young |
| 3 | R2 | (Georgia (U.S. state)) Road Atlanta | April 16–18 | (United States) Blake Young | (United States) Blake Young | (United States) Blake Young |
| 4 | R1 | (California) Infineon Raceway | May 14–16 | (United States) Josh Hayes | (United States) Josh Hayes | (United States) Josh Hayes |
| 4 | R2 | (California) Infineon Raceway | May 14–16 | (United States) Josh Hayes | (United States) Josh Hayes | (United States) Josh Hayes |
| 5 | R1 | (Wisconsin) Road America | June 4–6 | (United States) Josh Hayes | (United States) Blake Young | (United States) Josh Hayes |
| 5 | R2 | (Wisconsin) Road America | June 4–6 | (United States) Josh Hayes | (United States) Tommy Hayden | (United States) Tommy Hayden |
| 6 | R1 | Mid-Ohio Sports Car Course | July 16–18 | (United States) Josh Hayes | (United States) Josh Hayes | (United States) Josh Hayes |
| 6 | R2 | Mid-Ohio Sports Car Course | July 16–18 | (United States) Josh Hayes | (United States) Ben Bostrom | (United States) Tommy Hayden |
| 7 | R1 | (California) Mazda Raceway Laguna Seca | July 23–25 | (United States) Ben Bostrom | (United States) Josh Hayes | (United States) Ben Bostrom |
| 8 | R1 | Virginia International Raceway | August 13–15 | (United States) Ben Bostrom | (United States) Ben Bostrom | (United States) Tommy Hayden |
| 8 | R2 | Virginia International Raceway | August 13–15 | (United States) Ben Bostrom | (United States) Josh Hayes | (United States) Josh Hayes |
| 9 | R1 | New Jersey Motorsports Park | September 3–5 | (United States) Tommy Hayden | (United States) Josh Hayes | (United States) Josh Hayes |
| 9 | R2 | New Jersey Motorsports Park | September 3–5 | (United States) Tommy Hayden | (United States) Tommy Hayden | (United States) Josh Hayes |
| 10 | R1 | (Alabama) Barber Motorsports Park | September 24–26 | (United States) Blake Young | (United States) Tommy Hayden | (United States) Tommy Hayden |
| 10 | R2 | (Alabama) Barber Motorsports Park | September 24–26 | (United States) Blake Young | (United States) Blake Young | (United States) Blake Young |

== Championship standings ==
=== Riders' Championship ===
| Pos | Rider | Bike | DAY | | FON | | RAT | | INF | | RAM | | MOH | | LAG | VIR | | NJ | | BAR | | Pts |
| Pos | Rider | Bike | R1 | R2 | R1 | R2 | R1 | R2 | R1 | R2 | R1 | R2 | R1 | R2 | R1 | R1 | R2 | R1 | R2 | R1 | R2 | Pts |
|---|---|---|---|---|---|---|---|---|---|---|---|---|---|---|---|---|---|---|---|---|---|---|
| 1 | (United States) Josh Hayes | Yamaha | 13 | 6 | 4 | 2 | 6 | 2 | **1** | **1** | **1** | **2** | **1** | **2** | 2 | 3 | 1 | 1 | 1 | 2 | 7 | 466 |
| 2 | (United States) Tommy Hayden | Suzuki | 2 | 2 | 6 | 1 | 2 | 3 | 6 | 4 | 2 | 1 | 3 | 1 | 3 | 1 | 3 | **2** | **2** | 1 | 4 | 452 |
| 3 | (United States) Jake Zemke | Suzuki | 1 | 1 | 2 | 4 | 3 | 4 | 4 | 6 | 5 | 3 | 6 | 6 | 6 | 8 | 8 | 6 | 6 | Ret | 5 | 332 |
| 4 | (United States) Larry Pegram | Ducati | 3 | 5 | 1 | 18 | 14 | 6 | 3 | 3 | 4 | 4 | 4 | 3 | 5 | 4 | 9 | 7 | 14 | Ret | 3 | 297 |
| 5 | (United States) Ben Bostrom | Yamaha | 18 | 3 | 8 | 6 | 4 | Ret | 2 | 2 | 7 | 6 | 2 | 4 | **1** | **2** | **2** | 3 | Ret | | | 295 |
| 6 | (United States) Blake Young | Suzuki | 5 | 7 | 5 | 3 | **1** | **1** | 5 | 5 | 3 | 7 | | | | | | 4 | 4 | **4** | **1** | 283 |
| 7 | (United States) Taylor Knapp | Suzuki | 7 | 10 | 13 | 9 | 8 | 7 | 11 | 9 | 8 | Ret | 11 | 7 | 11 | 5 | 5 | 9 | 8 | 5 | 8 | 227 |
| 8 | (United States) Chris Ulrich | Suzuki | 6 | 12 | 9 | 8 | 7 | 8 | 8 | 8 | 10 | 9 | 9 | 8 | Ret | 9 | 7 | Ret | 9 | DNS | DNS | 188 |
| 9 | (Canada) Brett McCormick | Suzuki | Ret | 8 | 12 | 7 | Ret | Ret | Ret | 13 | 9 | 8 | 7 | 5 | 8 | 6 | 4 | 13 | 5 | 10 | Ret | 180 |
| 10 | (United States) John Hopkins | Suzuki | DNS | Ret | 7 | 5 | 5 | 5 | | | | | | | | 15 | DNS | 5 | 3 | 3 | 2 | 151 |
| 11 | (United States) Geoff May | Buell | | | | | | | 12 | 10 | 11 | 10 | Ret | 9 | 10 | 14 | 6 | 8 | 7 | 6 | 6 | 143 |
| 12 | (United States) Chris Clark | Yamaha | 11 | 16 | 15 | 14 | 9 | 9 | 15 | 15 | 14 | 12 | 12 | Ret | 21 | 11 | 15 | 14 | 12 | 13 | Ret | 129 |
| 13 | (United States) Shane Narbonne | Suzuki | 9 | 13 | | | 12 | 11 | | | 12 | 11 | | | | 12 | 11 | 11 | 10 | 9 | 11 | 120 |
| 14 | (United States) Jake Holden | Honda | | | Ret | Ret | | | | | | | | | | | | | | | | 107 |
| 14 | (United States) Jake Holden | Suzuki | | | | | | | 7 | 7 | 6 | 5 | 5 | Ret | 4 | | | | | | | 107 |
| 14 | (United States) Jake Holden | Yamaha | | | | | | | | | | | | | | | | | | 7 | DNS | 107 |
| 15 | (Canada) Chris Peris | BMW | | | 20 | 11 | | | 10 | 12 | | | | | 9 | | | 10 | 15 | Ret | 12 | 69 |
| 16 | (United States) Johnny Rock Page | Suzuki | 14 | 17 | 19 | 17 | 15 | 14 | 17 | 17 | | | 14 | 12 | Ret | | | DNS | DNS | 17 | 16 | 63 |
| 17 | (United States) Eric Haugo | Suzuki | 12 | 14 | 17 | 16 | DNS | DNS | 20 | 18 | 16 | 15 | DNQ | DNQ | | 16 | 14 | | | 15 | 17 | 62 |
| 18 | (United States) Aaron Yates | Suzuki | **4** | **4** | **3** | **DNS** | | | | | | | | | | DNS | DNS | DNS | DNS | | | 59 |
| 19 | (United States) Eric Bostrom | Suzuki | | | | | | | | | | | 8 | 13 | 7 | 7 | Ret | | | 12 | DNS | 58 |
| 20 | (Australia) David Anthony | Suzuki | Ret | 9 | 10 | 10 | | | 9 | 11 | | | | | | | | | | | | 56 |
| 21 | (United States) Skip Salenius | Suzuki | 17 | 20 | | | 13 | 12 | | | | | | | 18 | | | | | | | 53 |
| 21 | (United States) Skip Salenius | Yamaha | | | | | | | | | | | | | | 13 | 12 | | | 16 | 15 | 53 |
| 22 | (Australia) Trent Gibson | Suzuki | 16 | 18 | | | | | 18 | 16 | Ret | 14 | | | 20 | | | | | 14 | 9 | 43 |
| 23 | (United States) Barrett Long | Ducati | 10 | Ret | | | 10 | 10 | | | | | | | | | | | | | | 33 |
| 24 | (Canada) Jordan Szoke | Honda | | | | | | | | | | | 10 | Ret | | 10 | 10 | | | | | 33 |
| 25 | (United States) Eric Pinson | BMW | 15 | 19 | 18 | Ret | 16 | 13 | 16 | Ret | Ret | 17 | DNS | DNS | | | | | | | | 33 |
| 26 | (United States) Shawn Higbee | Buell | 8 | Ret | | | | | | | | | | | | | | | | | | 32 |
| 26 | (United States) Shawn Higbee | Ducati | | | 11 | 12 | | | | | | | | | | | | | | | | 32 |
| 27 | (United States) Tim Hunt | Suzuki | | | | | 11 | 15 | | | 15 | 16 | | | | | | 16 | DNS | | | 32 |
| 28 | (United States) Chris Siebenhaar | Suzuki | | | 16 | 15 | | | 13 | 14 | | | | | 17 | | | | | | | 30 |
| 29 | (United States) Ricky Corey | Yamaha | | | | | | | | | | | | | 13 | | | | | 11 | 13 | 26 |
| 30 | (United States) Jeffrey Tigert | Honda | Ret | 11 | 14 | 13 | | | | | | | | | | | | | | | | 25 |
| 31 | (United States) Jeff Wood | Suzuki | | | | | | | | | | | | | | | | | | 8 | 10 | 24 |
| 32 | (United States) Tim Bemisderfer | BMW | | | | | | | | | | | | | | | | 12 | 11 | | | 19 |
| 33 | (United States) Greg Fryer | Yamaha | | | | | | | | | | | 13 | 11 | | | | | | | | 18 |
| 34 | (United States) Ron Hix | Suzuki | | | | | | | | | 13 | 13 | | | | | | | | | | 16 |
| 35 | (Australia) Chris Trounson | Suzuki | | | | | | | | | | | | | | | | 15 | 13 | | | 14 |
| 36 | (United States) Brian Parriott | Aprilia | | | | | | | 14 | Ret | | | | | 16 | | | | | | | 12 |
| 37 | (United States) Kurtis Roberts | Yamaha | | | | | | | DNQ | DNQ | | | Ret | 10 | | | | | | | | 11 |
| 38 | (United States) Jeremy Toye | BMW | | | | | | | | | | | | | 12 | | | | | | | 9 |
| 39 | (United States) Kenny Rodriguez | Yamaha | | | | | | | | | | | | | | Ret | 13 | | | | | 8 |
| 40 | (United States) Sean Dwyer | Suzuki | | | | | | | | | | | | | | | | | | Ret | 14 | 7 |
| 41 | (United States) Jason Pridmore | Suzuki | | | | | | | | | | | | | 14 | | | | | | | 7 |
| 42 | (United States) Scott Jensen | Suzuki | Ret | 15 | | | | | | | | | | | | | | | | | | 6 |
| 43 | (United States) Hawk Mazzotta | Yamaha | | | | | | | | | | | | | 15 | | | | | | | 6 |
| 44 | (United States) Mark Simon | BMW | | | Ret | DNS | | | 19 | Ret | | | | | DNS | | | | | | | 2 |
| 45 | (United States) Steve Atlas | Suzuki | | | | | | | | | | | | | 19 | | | | | | | 2 |
| | (United States) Tray Batey | Suzuki | | | | | Ret | DNS | | | | | | | | | | | | | | 0 |
| | (United States) Adrian Schlegel | Suzuki | DNQ | DNQ | | | | | | | DNS | DNS | | | | | | | | | | 0 |
| | (Canada) Jean Paul Tache | Suzuki | DNS | DNS | | | | | | | | | | | | | | | | | | 0 |
| | (United States) Lindsay McGregor | Yamaha | | | | | DNS | DNS | | | | | | | | | | | | | | 0 |
| | (Canada) Kevin Boisvert | Suzuki | | | | | | | DNQ | DNQ | | | | | DNS | | | | | | | 0 |
| | (Canada) Miguel Duhamel | Ducati | | | | | | | | | | | | | DNS | | | | | | | 0 |
| | (Australia) Josh Waters | Suzuki | | | | | | | | | | | | | DNS | | | | | | | 0 |
| | (United States) James Romero III | Suzuki | | | DNQ | DNQ | | | | | | | | | | | | | | | | 0 |
| Pos | Rider | Bike | DAY | | FON | | RAT | | INF | | RAM | | MOH | | LAG | VIR | | N-J | | BAR | | Pts |

| Colour | Result |
|---|---|
| Gold | Winner (1) |
| Silver | 2nd place (2) |
| Bronze | 3rd place (3) |
| Green | Finished, in points (4-20) |
| Blue | Finished, no points (21+) |
| Purple | Did not finish (Ret) |
| Purple | Not classified (NC) |
| Red | Did not qualify (DNQ) |
| Black | Disqualified (DSQ) |
| White | Did not start (DNS) |
| Blank | Did not participate |
| Blank | Withdrawn due to injury (INJ) |
| Blank | Excluded (EX) |
| Blank | Race cancelled (C) |
| **Bold** | **Pole Position** |
| Italics | Lap Leader |

=== Manufacturers' Championship ===
| Pos | Manufacturer | DAY | | FON | | RAT | | INF | | RAM | | MOH | | LAG | VIR | | N-J | | BAR | | Pts |
| Pos | Manufacturer | R1 | R2 | R1 | R2 | R1 | R2 | R1 | R2 | R1 | R2 | R1 | R2 | R1 | R1 | R2 | R1 | R2 | R1 | R2 | Pts |
|---|---|---|---|---|---|---|---|---|---|---|---|---|---|---|---|---|---|---|---|---|---|
| 1 | (Japan) Suzuki | 1 | 1 | 2 | 1 | 1 | 1 | 4 | 4 | 2 | 1 | 3 | 1 | 3 | 1 | 3 | 2 | 2 | 1 | 1 | 499 |
| 2 | (Japan) Yamaha | 11 | 3 | 4 | 2 | 4 | 2 | 1 | 1 | 1 | 2 | 1 | 2 | 1 | 2 | 1 | 1 | 1 | 2 | 7 | 471 |
| 3 | (Italy) Ducati | 3 | 5 | 1 | 12 | 10 | 6 | 3 | 3 | 4 | 4 | 4 | 3 | 5 | 4 | 9 | 7 | 14 | Ret | 3 | 307 |
| 4 | (United States) Buell | 8 | Ret | | | | | 12 | 10 | 11 | 10 | Ret | 9 | 10 | 14 | 6 | 8 | 7 | 6 | 6 | 156 |
| 5 | (Germany) BMW | 15 | 19 | 18 | 11 | 16 | 13 | 10 | 12 | Ret | 17 | | | 9 | | | 10 | 11 | Ret | 12 | 100 |
| 6 | (Japan) Honda | Ret | 11 | 14 | 13 | | | | | | | 10 | Ret | | 10 | 10 | | | | | 58 |
| 7 | (Italy) Aprilia | | | | | | | 14 | Ret | | | | | 16 | | | | | | | 12 |
| Pos | Manufacturer | DAY | | FON | | RAT | | INF | | RAM | | MOH | | LAG | VIR | | N-J | | BAR | | Pts |

== Entry list ==
2010 Entry List
| Team | Bike | No | Riders | Rounds |
|---|---|---|---|---|
| Blue Moon Liberty Waves BMW | BMW S1000RR | 2 | (United States) Eric Pinson | 1–6 |
| M4 Monster Suzuki | Suzuki GSX-R1000 | 3 | (United States) Jake Holden | 4–7 |
| M4 Monster Suzuki | Suzuki GSX-R1000 | 18 | (United States) Chris Ulrich | All |
| M4 Monster Suzuki | Suzuki GSX-R1000 | 21 | (United States) John Hopkins | 1–3, 8–10 |
| Team Graves Yamaha | Yamaha YZF-R1 | 4 | (United States) Josh Hayes | All |
| Picotte Racing | Suzuki GSX-R1000 | 6 | (Canada) Brett McCormick | 1 |
| Celtic Racing | Suzuki GSX-R1000 | 7 | (Canada) Brett McCormick | 2 |
| Celtic Racing | Suzuki GSX-R1000 | 7 | (United States) Shane Narbonne | 5, 9–10 |
| Celtic Racing | Suzuki GSX-R1000 | 7 | (United States) Jason Pridmore | 7 |
| Moto Forza/Nova Tac Racing | Ducati 1098R | 8 | (Canada) Miguel Duhamel | 7 |
| Viking Moto | Suzuki GSX-R1000 | 9 | (United States) Eric Haugo | 1–6, 8, 10 |
| Team Iron Horse BMW/ESP | BMW S1000RR | 10 | (Canada) Chris Peris | 2, 4, 7, 9–10 |
| Higbee-Racing | Buell 1125R | 11 | (United States) Shawn Higbee | 1–2 |
| Gibson Motorsports | Suzuki GSX-R1000 | 12 | (Australia) Trent Gibson | 1, 4–5, 7, 10 |
| Rockstar/Makita/Suzuki | Suzuki GSX-R1000 | 19 | (Australia) Josh Waters | 7 |
| Rockstar/Makita/Suzuki | Suzuki GSX-R1000 | 22 | (United States) Tommy Hayden | All |
| Rockstar/Makita/Suzuki | Suzuki GSX-R1000 | 79 | (United States) Blake Young | 1–5, 9–10 |
| Jordan Suzuki | Suzuki GSX-R1000 | 23 | (United States) Aaron Yates | 1–2, 8–9 |
| Jordan Suzuki | Suzuki GSX-R1000 | 23 | (Canada) Brett McCormick | 3–7, 10 |
| Jordan Suzuki | Suzuki GSX-R1000 | 45 | (Canada) Brett McCormick | 8–9 |
| Jordan Suzuki | Suzuki GSX-R1000 | 54 | (United States) Jake Zemke | All |
| Aussie Dave Racing | Suzuki GSX-R1000 | 25 | (Australia) David Anthony | 1–2, 4–5 |
| Aussie Dave Racing | Suzuki GSX-R1000 | 25 | (United States) Tim Hunt | 3 |
| Aussie Dave Racing | Suzuki GSX-R1000 | 25 | (Australia) Chris Trounson | 9 |
| Aussie Dave Racing | Suzuki GSX-R1000 | 52 | (United States) Adrian Schlegel | 1 |
| Aussie Dave Racing | Suzuki GSX-R1000 | 269 | (United States) Johnny Rock Page | 1–4, 6–7, 9–10 |
| Aussie Dave Racing | Suzuki GSX-R1000 | 269 | (United States) Adrian Schlegel | 5 |
| Four Feathers Racing | Suzuki GSX-R1000 | 27 | (Canada) Jean Paul Tache | 1 |
| Four Feathers Racing | Suzuki GSX-R1000 | 47 | (United States) Scott Jensen | 1 |
| Longevity Racing | Ducati 1098R | 29 | (United States) Barrett Long | 1, 3 |
| Yoshimura Suzuki | Suzuki GSX-R1000 | 32 | (United States) Eric Bostrom | 6–8, 10 |
| Yoshimura Suzuki | Suzuki GSX-R1000 | 58 | (United States) Steve Atlas | 7 |
| Vesrah Suzuki | Suzuki GSX-R1000 | 33 | (United States) Tray Batey | 3 |
| Vesrah Suzuki | Suzuki GSX-R1000 | 75 | (United States) Jeff Wood | 10 |
| BCS Racing | Suzuki GSX-R1000 | 42 | (United States) Chris Siebenhaar | 2, 4, 7 |
| RidersDiscount.com/Taylor Knapp Racing | Suzuki GSX-R1000 | 44 | (United States) Taylor Knapp | All |
| RidersDiscount.com/Taylor Knapp Racing | Yamaha YZF-R1 | 81 | (United States) Kurtis Roberts | 6 |
| Sutter Home Family Vineyards Racing Team | Aprilia RSV1000R | 46 | (United States) Brian Parriott | 4, 7 |
| Pat Clark Motorsports | Yamaha YZF-R1 | 48 | (United States) Chris Clark | All |
| Pat Clark Motorsports | Yamaha YZF-R1 | 155 | (United States) Ben Bostrom | 1–9 |
| Pat Clark Motorsports | Yamaha YZF-R1 | 155 | (United States) Jake Holden | 10 |
| San Diego BMW Racing | BMW S1000RR | 57 | (United States) Jeremy Toye | 7 |
| Holden Racing | Honda CBR1000RR | 59 | (United States) Jake Holden | 2 |
| FJ Racing | Yamaha YZF-R1 | 60 | (United States) Greg Fryer | 6 |
| Run 1 Racing Motorsports | Suzuki GSX-R1000 | 63 | (United States) Skip Salenius | 1, 3, 7 |
| Run 1 Racing Motorsports | Yamaha YZF-R1 | 63 | (United States) Skip Salenius | 8, 10 |
| DASPerformance.com | Suzuki GSX-R1000 | 64 | (United States) Shane Narbonne | 1, 3, 8 |
| JR3Racing.com | Suzuki GSX-R1000 | 65 | (United States) James Romero III | 2 |
| Bayside Performance | Suzuki GSX-R1000 | 68 | (Canada) Kevin Boisvert | 4, 7 |
| Hooters/Apex | Suzuki GSX-R1000 | 71 | (United States) Tim Hunt | 5, 9 |
| Foremost Insurance/Pegram Racing | Ducati 1098R | 72 | (United States) Larry Pegram | All |
| RCR Yamaha | Yamaha YZF-R1 | 77 | (United States) Ricky Corey | 7, 10 |
| Ace Racing | Yamaha YZF-R1 | 80 | (United States) Kurtis Roberts | 4 |
| Ace Racing | Yamaha YZF-R1 | 121 | (United States) Hawk Mazzotta | 7 |
| TigerTeam Racing | Honda CBR1000RR | 91 | (United States) Jeffrey Tigert | 1–2 |
| Erik Buell Racing | Buell 1125RR | 99 | (United States) Geoff May | 4–10 |
| Dewildt Honda | Honda CBR1000RR | 101 | (Canada) Jordan Szoke | 6, 8 |
| X Dot Racing | BMW S1000RR | 102 | (United States) Mark Simon | 2, 4, 7 |
| Graham Motorsports | Yamaha YZF-R1 | 111 | (United States) Kenny Rodriguez | 8 |
| Black Ice Racing | Yamaha YZF-R1 | 117 | (United States) Lindsay McGregor | 3 |
| Vicious Cycle Racing | Suzuki GSX-R1000 | 429 | (United States) Sean Dwyer | 10 |
| Bio Weapon | BMW S1000RR | 511 | (United States) Tim Bemisderfer | 9 |
| Hix Racing | Suzuki GSX-R1000 | 975 | (United States) Ron Hix | 5 |

Key
Regular Rider
Wildcard Rider
Replacement Rider

== See also ==
- 2010 AMA Pro Supersport Championship season
- 2010 AMA Pro Daytona Sportbike Championship
