= Tommy Hayden =

American motorcycle racer

Thommy Hayden
- Born: Thomas Hayden; July 14, 1978 (age 48); Owensboro, Kentucky, U.S.
- Occupation: Motorcycle racer
- Spouse: Christie Brown (m. 2007)
- Children: 3
- Relatives: Nicky Hayden (brother); Roger Lee Hayden (brother)

Thomas Hayden (born July 14, 1978), aka Tommy Gun, is an American professional motorcycle racer and oldest brother to racers Nicky and Roger Lee.

== Biography ==
Hayden was born and raised in Owensboro, Kentucky, where he currently resides. His two younger brothers, Nicky and Roger Lee, are also professional factory-backed motorcycle racers and his father, Earl, was a dirt track racer for twenty years. Hayden's mother, Rose, also rode the Powder Puff class for five years.

Hayden turned pro in 1994 and is still a regular competitor in the Grand National Flat Track series during weekends when he is not road racing. When away from the racetrack, he enjoys riding mountain bikes, motocross, supermoto, playing golf, and jet skiing.

Hayden married his longtime girlfriend Christie Brown in November 2007 in Owensboro, KY.

Christie gave birth to Vera Claire Hayden on September 27, 2011, Klaudia Rose Hayden on October 6, 2009, and Olivia Mikaye Hayden July 17, 2003.

== Racing history ==
Hayden finished sixth in the 2006 AMA Superbike Championship. In 2004, he won the first ever championship in the AMA Supersport class. In 2001, at the Springfield TT, the Hayden brothers took the first three positions: Nicky Hayden placed first, Tommy placed second, and Roger Lee Hayden finished third. He was the 1998 AMA Superbike Rookie of the Year

== Career statistics ==
=== AMA Pro Racing ===
Year	Class	Team	Bike	DAY (Florida)		FON (California)		RAT (Georgia (U.S. state))		INF (California)		RAM (Wisconsin)		M-O (Ohio)		LAG (California)	VIR (Virginia)		N-J (New Jersey)		BAR (Alabama)		Pts	Pos
Year	Class	Team	Bike	R1	R2	R1	R2	R1	R2	R1	R2	R1	R2	R1	R2	R1	R1	R2	R1	R2	R1	R2	Pts	Pos
2010	SBK	Yoshimura	Suzuki GSX-R1000	2	2	6	1	2	3	6	4	2	1	3	1	3	1	3	2	2	1	4	452	2nd

- * Season still in progress

Year	Class	Team	Bike	DAY (Florida)	FON (California)		RAT (Georgia (U.S. state))		BAR (Alabama)		INF (California)		RAM (Wisconsin)		LAG (California)	M-O (Ohio)		HRT (Kansas)		VIR (Virginia)		N-J (New Jersey)		Pts	Pos
Year	Class	Team	Bike	R1	R1	R2	R1	R2	R1	R2	R1	R2	R1	R2	R1	R1	R2	R1	R2	R1	R2	R1	R2	Pts	Pos
2009	SBK	Yoshimura	Suzuki GSX-R1000	3	2	2	2	6	4	8	2	3	9	7	8	6	3	4	2	5	2	2	22	373	3rd

Year	Class	Team	Bike	DAY (Florida)	BAR (Alabama)		FON (California)		INF (California)		MIL (Utah)		RAM (Wisconsin)		LAG (California)	M-O (Ohio)		VIR (Virginia)		RAT (Georgia (U.S. state))		LAG (California)	Pts	Pos
Year	Class	Team	Bike	R1	R1	R2	R1	R2	R1	R2	R1	R2	R1	R2	R1	R1	R2	R1	R2	R1	R2	R1	Pts	Pos
2008	SBK	Yoshimura	Suzuki GSX-R1000	4	3	3	3	3	inj	inj	inj	inj	inj	inj	5	5	5	2	2	3	3	3	372	8th

Year	Class	Team	Bike	DAY (Florida)	BAR (Alabama)		FON (California)		INF (California)		RAM (Wisconsin)		MIL (Utah)		LAG (California)	M-O (Ohio)		VIR (Virginia)		RAT (Georgia (U.S. state))		LAG (California)	Pts	Pos
Year	Class	Team	Bike	R1	R1	R2	R1	R2	R1	R2	R1	R2	R1	R2	R1	R1	R2	R1	R2	R1	R2	R1	Pts	Pos
2007	SBK	Yoshimura	Suzuki GSX-R1000	8	5	4	4	4	7	5	3	15	7	6	13	9	9	9	5	10	7	6	454	5th
2007	SS	Yoshimura	Suzuki GSX-R600	3	6		6		10		6		20		10	C		13		13		8	216	5th

Year	Class	Team	Bike	DAY (Florida)	BAR (Alabama)		FON (California)		INF (California)		RAM (Wisconsin)		MIL (Utah)		LAG (California)	M-O (Ohio)		VIR (Virginia)		RAT (Georgia (U.S. state))		M-O (Ohio)	Pts	Pos
Year	Class	Team	Bike	R1	R1	R2	R1	R2	R1	R2	R1	R2	R1	R2	R1	R1	R2	R1	R2	R1	R2	R1	Pts	Pos
2006	SBK	Kawasaki	Kawasaki ZX-10R	6	6	8	9	7	8	7	8	9	6	6	2	6	8	9	24	8	10	7	455	6th
2006	SS	Kawasaki	Kawasaki ZX-6R	3	DNS		DNS		DNS		DNS		DNS		DNS	DNS		DNS		DNS		DNS	29	35th

Year	Class	Team	Bike	DAY (Florida)	BAR (Alabama)	FON (California)	INF (California)	PPK (Colorado)	RAM (Wisconsin)	LAG (California)	M-O (Ohio)	VIR (Virginia)	RAT (Georgia (U.S. state))	Pts	Pos
2005	SStk	Kawasaki	Kawasaki ZX-10R	7	1	4	5	3	5	31	DNS	DNS	DNS	168	10th
2005	SS	Kawasaki	Kawasaki ZX-6R	1	2	2	1	2	1	6	2	2	5	327	1st

Year	Class	Team	Bike	DAY (Florida)	FON (California)	INF (California)	BAR (Alabama)	PPK (Colorado)	RAM (Wisconsin)	BRD (Minnesota)	LAG (California)	M-O (Ohio)	RAT (Georgia (U.S. state))	VIR (Virginia)	Pts	Pos
2004	SStk	Kawasaki	Kawasaki ZX-10R	3	7	4	2	6	1	4	1	10	3	6	313	3rd
2004	SS	Kawasaki	Kawasaki ZX-6R	3	1	3	2	1	1	1	3	4	2	5	352	1st

Year	Class	Team	1		2		3	4		5		6		7	8		Pos	Pts
Year	Class	Team	R1	R2	R1	R2	R1	R1	R2	R1	R2	R1	R2	R1	R1	R2	Pos	Pts
2011	SuperBike	Suzuki	DAY; 2	DAY; 3	INF; 2	INF; 1	UTA; 3	RAM; 3	RAM; 2	BAR; 7	BAR; Ret	MOH; 3	MOH; 1	LAG; 1	NJE; 3	NJE; 17	3rd	288
