= 2011 AMA Pro American Superbike Championship =

2011 AMA Pro Am Superbike Championship

Seasons
- ← 2010 2012 →

The 2011 AMA Pro American Superbike Championship was the 36th running of the AMA Superbike Championship. The championship covered 8 rounds beginning at Daytona International Speedway on March 11 and concluding at New Jersey Motorsports Park on September 4. The champion was Josh Hayes riding a Yamaha.

== Race calendar and results ==
No		Round/Circuit	Date	Pole position	Fastest lap	Winner
1	R1	(Florida) Daytona International Speedway	March 10–12	(United States) Josh Hayes	(United States) Ben Bostrom	(United States) Blake Young
1	R2	(Florida) Daytona International Speedway	March 10–12	(United States) Josh Hayes	(United States) Blake Young	(United States) Blake Young
2	R1	(California) Infineon Raceway	May 13–15	(United States) Josh Hayes	(United States) Josh Hayes	(United States) Josh Hayes
2	R2	(California) Infineon Raceway	May 13–15	(United States) Josh Hayes	(United States) Tommy Hayden	(United States) Tommy Hayden
3	R1	(Utah) Miller Motorsports Park^{†}	May 28–30	(United States) Josh Hayes	(United States) Tommy Hayden	(United States) Blake Young
4	R1	(Wisconsin) Road America	June 3–5	(United States) Josh Hayes	(United States) Blake Young	(United States) Blake Young
4	R2	(Wisconsin) Road America	June 3–5	(United States) Josh Hayes	(United States) Josh Hayes	(United States) Josh Hayes
5	R1	(Alabama) Barber Motorsports Park	June 17–19	(United States) Josh Hayes	(United States) Tommy Hayden	(Colombia) Martín Cárdenas
5	R2	(Alabama) Barber Motorsports Park	June 17–19	(United States) Josh Hayes	(United States) Blake Young	(United States) Blake Young
6	R1	Mid-Ohio Sports Car Course	July 8–10	(United States) Blake Young	(United States) Tommy Hayden	(United States) Blake Young
6	R2	Mid-Ohio Sports Car Course	July 8–10	(United States) Blake Young	(United States) Blake Young	(United States) Tommy Hayden
7	R1	(California) Mazda Raceway Laguna Seca^{‡}	July 22–24	(United States) Josh Hayes	(United States) Josh Hayes	(United States) Tommy Hayden
8	R1	New Jersey Motorsports Park	September 2–4	(United States) Josh Hayes	(United States) Josh Hayes	(United States) Josh Hayes
8	R2	New Jersey Motorsports Park	September 2–4	(United States) Josh Hayes	(United States) Steve Rapp	(United States) Blake Young

† = World Superbike Weekend
‡ = MotoGP weekend

== Championship standings ==
=== Riders' Championship ===
Pos	Rider	Bike	DAY		INF		MIL	RAM		BAR		MOH		LGS	NJR		Points
1	(United States) Josh Hayes	Yamaha	**3**	**2**	**1***	**2**	**2**	**2**	**1***	**4**	**2**	2	4	**2***	**1***	**2**	363
2	(United States) Blake Young	Suzuki	1	1*	4	3	1	1*	3	3	1*	**1**	**2***	3	5	1	358
3	(United States) Tommy Hayden	Suzuki	2	3	2	1*	3*	3	2	7*	Ret	3*	1	1	3	17	288
4	(Colombia) Martín Cárdenas	Suzuki	6	4	3	8	Ret	4	4	1	3	5	5	8	8	4	231
5	(United States) Ben Bostrom	Suzuki	4*	5	19	6	8	7	10	2	5	14	6	5	2	5	209
6	(United States) Roger Lee Hayden	Suzuki	5	15	18	7	4	6	5	6	18	4	3	4	4	3	202
7	(United States) Larry Pegram	BMW	7	6	7	5	16	5	7	5	6	6	7	6	7	14	190
8	(United States) Chris Clark	Yamaha	11	7	11	10	6	8	9	16	8	13	12	9	9	8	157
9	(United States) Steve Rapp	BMW			6	4	5	17	6	12	4	8	Ret	7			139
9	(United States) Steve Rapp	Kawasaki													6	19*	139
10	(United States) Geoff May	Buell	Ret	12	8	12	7	10	17	13	7						139
10	(United States) Geoff May	EBR										11	10	10	11	6	139
11	(Canada) Chris Peris	BMW	Ret	10	5	9	Ret	Ret	8	11	9	Ret	DNS	11	14	11	101
12	(United States) J. D. Beach	Kawasaki			9	Ret	15	11	Ret	8	10	10	8	12	16	10	101
13	(United States) Jeremy Toye	BMW	8	13	16	11	10			10	16	12	11	Ret	15	9	100
14	(Australia) David Anthony	Suzuki	10	9	17	Ret	9	12	12			9	Ret		DNS	DNS	69
15	(Australia) Jordan Burgess	Suzuki	14	19	Ret	Ret	Ret	13	15	14	15	15	14	15	17	12	68
16	(Australia) Trent Gibson	Suzuki	18	17			13	15	14	9	12			DNQ			49
17	(Australia) Chris Trounson	Suzuki	Ret	DNS													43
17	(Australia) Chris Trounson	BMW			12	14	Ret			15	11	Ret	17	14			43
18	(United States) Chris Ulrich	Suzuki	9	11	10	Ret						DNS	DNS	18	Ret	DNS	36
19	(United States) Reese Wacker	Suzuki						16	16	17	14	17	16		Ret	15	36
20	(United States) Jason Farrell	Kawasaki						9	11			16	13				35
21	(United States) Chris Fillmore	KTM										7	9	DNS	Ret	18	29
22	(United States) Chris Siebenhaar	Suzuki	DNQ	DNQ	13	15	12							16			28
23	(United States) Shane Narbonne	Suzuki	12	14								19	Ret		Ret	13	26
24	(United States) Taylor Knapp	EBR													12	7	23
25	(United States) Eric Pinson	BMW	15	Ret				DNQ	DNQ								23
25	(United States) Eric Pinson	Kawasaki										18	15		18	16	23
26	(United States) Tony Kasper	BMW			14	Ret	11	18	DNS								20
27	(United States) Brian Hall	Kawasaki						14	13								15
28	(United States) James Randolph	BMW			15	13											14
29	(United States) Eric Bostrom	Kawasaki	Ret	8													13
30	(United States) Eric Haugo	Suzuki	13	16			DNQ	DNS	DNS						DNQ	DNQ	13
30	(United States) Eric Haugo	BMW								DNQ	DNQ						13
31	(Canada) Brett McCormick	BMW													10	Ret	11
32	(United States) Danny Kelsey	Honda								18	13						11
33	(United States) Wesley Kane	Suzuki			DNQ	DNQ	14							17			11
34	(Australia) Aaron Gobert	BMW													13	DNS	8
35	(United States) Ricky Corey	Yamaha												13			8
36	(United States) Jeffrey Lampe	Kawasaki	17	18													7
37	(United States) Skip Salenius	Yamaha	Ret	Ret			DNQ			19	17						6
38	(Slovenia) Bostjan Skubic	Yamaha	16	Ret													5
39	(Canada) Kevin Boisvert	Suzuki			DNQ	DNQ	DNQ			Ret	19			DNQ			2
40	(United States) Johnny Rock Page	Suzuki	Ret	20	DNQ	DNQ						DNQ	DNQ	DNQ	DNQ	DNQ	1
	(United States) Jake Holden	BMW												DNS			0
	(United States) Gary Orr	BMW	DNQ	DNQ													0
	(United States) Scotty Van Hawk	Suzuki										DNQ	DNQ				0
Pos	Rider	Bike	DAY		INF		MIL	RAM		BAR		MOH		LGS	NJR		Points

Colour	Result
Gold	Winner (1)
Silver	2nd place (2)
Bronze	3rd place (3)
Green	Finished, in points (4-20)
Blue	Finished, no points (21+)
Purple	Did not finish (Ret)
Purple	Not classified (NC)
Red	Did not qualify (DNQ)
Black	Disqualified (DSQ)
White	Did not start (DNS)
Blank	Did not participate
Blank	Withdrawn due to injury (INJ)
Blank	Excluded (EX)
Blank	Race cancelled (C)
**Bold**	**Pole Position**
Italics	Lap Leader

=== Manufacturers' Championship ===
Pos	Manufacturer	DAY		INF		MIL	RAM		BAR		MOH		LGS	NJR		Points
1	(Japan) Suzuki	1	1	2	1	1	1	2	1	1	1	1	1	2	1	405
2	(Japan) Yamaha	3	2	1	2	2	2	1	4	2	2	4	2	1	2	347
3	(Germany) BMW	7	6	5	4	5	5	6	5	4	6	7	6	7	9	214
4	(Japan) Kawasaki	17	8	9	Ret	15	9	11	8	10	10	8	12	6	10	142
5	(United States) Buell	Ret	12	8	12	7	10	17	13	7						83
6	(United States) EBR										11	10	10	11	6	57
7	(Austria) KTM										7	9	DNS	Ret	18	29
8	(Japan) Honda								18	13						11
Pos	Manufacturer	DAY		INF		MIL	RAM		BAR		MOH		LGS	NJR		Points

== Entry list ==
Team	Bike	No.	Rider	Rounds
Monster Graves Yamaha	Yamaha YZF-R1	1	(United States) Josh Hayes	All
Y.E.S./Pat Clark/Graves Yamaha	Yamaha YZF-R1	2	(United States) Chris Clark	All
McCormick Racing	BMW S1000RR	6	(Canada) Brett McCormick	8
Team Iron Horse BMW	BMW S1000RR	8	(Canada) Chris Peris	All
Team Iron Horse BMW	BMW S1000RR	68	(United States) Tony Kasper	2–4
Viking Moto	Suzuki GSX-R1000	9	(United States) Eric Haugo	1, 3–4, 8
Cycle World Attack Performance	Kawasaki Ninja ZX-10R	10	(United States) Eric Bostrom	1
Cycle World Attack Performance	Kawasaki Ninja ZX-10R	10	(United States) J. D. Beach	2–8
Cycle World Attack Performance	Kawasaki Ninja ZX-10R	15	(United States) Steve Rapp	8
KTM/HMC Racing	KTM RC8R	11	(United States) Chris Fillmore	6–8
Seven Sports	Suzuki GSX-R1000	12	(Australia) Trent Gibson	1, 3–5, 7
San Diego BMW Motorsports	BMW S1000RR	15	(United States) Steve Rapp	2–7
San Diego BMW Motorsports	BMW S1000RR	45	(United States) James Randolph	2
San Diego BMW Motorsports	BMW S1000RR	51	(United States) Gary Orr	1
San Diego BMW Motorsports	BMW S1000RR	57	(United States) Jeremy Toye	1–3, 5–8
San Diego BMW Motorsports	BMW S1000RR	62	(Australia) Chris Trounson	2–3, 5–7
San Diego BMW Motorsports	BMW S1000RR	96	(Australia) Aaron Gobert	8
M4 Suzuki	Suzuki GSX-R1000	18	(United States) Chris Ulrich	1–2, 6–8
M4 Suzuki	Suzuki GSX-R1000	36	(Colombia) Martin Cardenas	All
Rockstar Makita Suzuki	Suzuki GSX-R1000	22	(United States) Tommy Hayden	All
Rockstar Makita Suzuki	Suzuki GSX-R1000	79	(United States) Blake Young	All
Jordan Suzuki	Suzuki GSX-R1000	23	(United States) Ben Bostrom	All
Jordan Suzuki	Suzuki GSX-R1000	54	(United States) Roger Lee Hayden	All
ADR Fly Racing	Suzuki GSX-R1000	25	(Australia) David Anthony	1–4, 6, 8
ADR Fly Racing	Suzuki GSX-R1000	26	(Australia) Chris Trounson	1
ADR Fly Racing	Suzuki GSX-R1000	33	(Australia) Jordan Burgess	All
ADR Fly Racing	Suzuki GSX-R1000	269	(United States) Johnny Rock Page	1–2, 6–8
Four Feathers Racing	BMW S1000RR	27	(United States) Eric Haugo	5
Four Feathers Racing	BMW S1000RR	27	(United States) Scotty Van Hawk	6
Bayside Performance	Suzuki GSX-R1000	28	(Canada) Kevin Boisvert	2–3, 5, 7
M & M Roadracing	Honda CBR1000RR	34	(United States) Danny Kelsey	5
Liberty Waves Racing; Go4one Braille Neyra Racing	BMW S1000RR	41	(United States) Eric Pinson	1, 4
Liberty Waves Racing; Go4one Braille Neyra Racing	Kawasaki Ninja ZX-10R	41	(United States) Eric Pinson	6, 8
Rockwell Time/BCS Racing	Suzuki GSX-R1000	42	(United States) Chris Siebenhaar	1–3, 7
Taylor Knapp Racing	EBR 1190RS	44	(United States) Taylor Knapp	8
Kissimmee Motorsports Kawasaki	Kawasaki Ninja ZX-10R	46	(United States) Jeffrey Lampe	1
Jake Holden Racing	BMW S1000RR	59	(United States) Jake Holden	7
Run 1 Racing Motorsports; Karma Tequila Racing	Yamaha YZF-R1	63	(United States) Skip Salenius	1, 3, 5
DASPerformance.com	Suzuki GSX-R1000	64	(United States) Shane Narbonne	1, 6, 8
Schaumburg Audi	Kawasaki Ninja ZX-10R	66	(United States) Brian Hall	4
Foremost Insurance Pegram Racing	BMW S1000RR	72	(United States) Larry Pegram	All
Inotherm Yamaha Racing Team Slovenia	Yamaha YZF-R1	74	(Slovenia) Bostjan Skubic	1
RCR Yamaha	Yamaha YZF-R1	77	(United States) Ricky Corey	7
Wacker Racing LLC	Suzuki GSX-R1000	78	(United States) Reese Wacker	4–6, 8
Speed Tech Performance	Kawasaki Ninja ZX-10R	86	(United States) Jason Farrell	4, 6
Erik Buell Racing	Buell 1125R	99	(United States) Geoff May	1–5
Erik Buell Racing	EBR 1190RS	99	(United States) Geoff May	6–8
M Racing	Suzuki GSX-R1000	988	(United States) Wesley Kane	2–3, 7

Key
Regular Rider
Wildcard Rider
Replacement Rider

== See also ==
- 2011 AMA Pro Daytona Sportbike Championship
