= 2003 AMA Superbike Championship =

Seasons
- ← 2002 2004 →

The AMA Superbike Championship started in 1976. 2003 was the 28th season of the AMA Superbike Championship.

== Season calendar ==
No	Round/Circuit	Superbike Race 1 Winner	Superbike Race 2 Winner	Superstock Race Winner	FX Race Winner	Supersport Race Winner	250 GP Race Winner
1	(Florida) Daytona	Miguel Duhamel	-	-	-	-	-
2	(California) Fontana	Mat Mladin	Mat Mladin	Tommy Hayden	Ben Spies	Jamie Hacking	Rich Oliver
3	(California) Sears Point	Mat Mladin	Mat Mladin	Tommy Hayden	Ben Spies	Jamie Hacking	Rich Oliver
4	(Georgia (U.S. state)) Road Atlanta	Aaron Yates	Mat Mladin	Vincent Haskovec	Jamie Hacking	Ben Spies	Rich Oliver
5	(Colorado) Pikes Peak	Eric Bostrom	-	Tony Meiring	Damon Buckmaster	Jamie Hacking	Rich Oliver
6	(Wisconsin) Road America	Mat Mladin	Eric Bostrom	Steve Rapp	Damon Buckmaster	Tommy Hayden	Rich Oliver
7	(Minnesota) Brainerd	Aaron Yates	-	Steve Rapp	Jake Zemke	Miguel Duhamel	Rich Oliver
8	(California) Laguna Seca	Mat Mladin	-	Josh Hayes	Ben Spies	Jamie Hacking	Rich Oliver
9	Mid-Ohio	Mat Mladin	Mat Mladin	Josh Hayes	Ben Spies	Jake Zemke	Rich Oliver
10	(Virginia) VIR	Mat Mladin	Kurtis Roberts	Tommy Hayden	Ben Spies	Damon Buckmaster	Rich Oliver
11	(Alabama) Barber	Aaron Yates	Kurtis Roberts	Tommy Hayden	Jamie Hacking	Tommy Hayden	Rich Oliver

== AMA Superbike ==
=== Rider standings ===
Pos	Rider	Bike	DAY	FON		SP		RAT		PPK	RAM		BRD	LAG	M-O		VIR		BAR		Pts
Pos	Rider	Bike	R1	R1	R2	R1	R2	R1	R2	R1	R1	R2	R1	R1	R1	R2	R1	R2	R1	R2	Pts
1	Mat Mladin	Suzuki																			550
2	Aaron Yates	Suzuki																			519
3	Kurtis Roberts	Honda																			474
4	Ben Bostrom	Honda																			462
5	Miguel Duhamel	Honda																			417
6	Shawn Higbee	Suzuki																			396
7	Eric Bostrom	Kawasaki																			350
8	Jason Pridmore	Suzuki																			339
9	Vincent Haskovec	Suzuki																			285
10	Jordan Szoke	Suzuki																			283
11	Geoff May	Suzuki																			249
12	Michael Barnes	Suzuki																			238
13	Mike Ciccotto	Suzuki																			229
14	Larry Pegram	Ducati																			211
15	Scott Jensen	Suzuki																			210
16	Giovanni Bussei	Ducati																			186
17	Jake Holden	Suzuki																			179
18	Jeremy Toye	Suzuki																			175
19	Dean Mizdal	Suzuki																			168
20	Anthony Gobert	Ducati																			131
21	Andrew Deatherage	Suzuki																			129
22	J.J. Roetlin	Suzuki																			129
23	John Dugan	Suzuki																			113
24	Tom Wertman	Suzuki																			97
25	Steve Rapp	Suzuki																			93
26	Marco Martinez	Suzuki																			93
27	Brian Stokes	Suzuki																			88
28	John Haner	Yamaha																			84
29	Steve Crevier	Suzuki																			81
30	Jack Pfeifer	Suzuki																			77
31	Robert Christman	Suzuki																			75
32	Mike Sullivan	Suzuki																			62
33	John Jacobi	Suzuki																			60
34	James Randolph	Suzuki																			58
35	Monte Nichols	Suzuki																			57
37	Eric Wood	Suzuki																			56
38	Douglas Duane	Suzuki																			50
39	Ricky Orlando	Suzuki																			48
40	Opie Caylor	Suzuki																			48
41	Tom Kipp	Kawasaki																			46
42	Rich Conicelli	Suzuki																			46
43	Byron Barbour	Suzuki																			45
44	Brian Livengood	Suzuki																			42
45	Kevin Lehman	Yamaha																			41
46	Lee Acree	Suzuki																			39
47	Francis Martin	Suzuki																			39
48	Alan Schmidt	Suzuki																			39
49	Scott Carpenter	Suzuki																			33
50	Clint McBain	Suzuki																			33
51	Troy Green	Yamaha																			32
52	Thomas Montano	Suzuki																			32
53	Jeff Bostrom	Suzuki																			26
54	Ben Spies	Suzuki																			24
55	Scott Harwell	Suzuki																			23
56	Anthony Fania	Suzuki																			21
57	Roger Hendricks	Suzuki																			20
58	Daniel Turner	Yamaha																			19
59	Jason Knupp	Suzuki																			19
60	Michael Sanchez	Suzuki																			19
61	Jimmy Moore	Suzuki																			17
62	Pascal Picottet	Yamaha																			17
63	Sandor Bitter	Suzuki																			17
64	David Duprey	Suzuki																			17
65	Rob Mesa	Suzuki																			17
66	Jeff Muskopf	Suzuki																			16
67	Reuben Frankenfield	Suzuki																			16
68	Kevin Hanson	Suzuki																			16
69	Wesley Good	Suzuki																			15
70	Jeffrey Tigert	Suzuki																			15
71	Warwick Nowland	Suzuki																			15
