= Daytona 200 =

Motorcycle race held in Daytona, United States

MotoAmerica
- Venue: Daytona International Raceway
- First race: 1937
- Distance: 200.07 miles (321.98 km)
- Laps: 57
- Most wins (rider): Scott Russell (5); Miguel Duhamel (5) Josh Herrin (5)
- Most wins (team): Yamaha Motor Company (12)
- Most wins (manufacturer): Yamaha (26)

The Daytona 200 is an annual motorcycle road racing competition held in early spring at the Daytona International Speedway in Daytona Beach, Florida. The 200-mile (320 km) race was founded in 1937 when it was sanctioned by the American Motorcyclist Association (AMA). The original course used the beach itself before moving to a paved closed circuit in 1961. The Daytona 200 reached its zenith of worldwide popularity in the 1970s when the race attracted the largest crowds of any AMA race along with some of the top rated international motorcycle racers. The race is currently promoted by MotoAmerica and run in their middleweight Supersport Class. The race is typically held in early March during Daytona Beach Bike Week.

== History ==
=== Dirt track origins ===
The origins of the Daytona 200 began in 1932 when the Southeastern Motorcycle Dealers Association organized a 200-mile dirt track race held on the old Vanderbilt Cup course in Savannah, Georgia. Competitors raced on Class C motorcycles typically used in the AMA Grand National Championship. Following a second Savannah race held in 1933, the 1934 event was moved to the Camp Foster Work Camp located on the St. Johns River near Jacksonville, Florida. The competition quickly outgrew the narrow, Jacksonville course and after the 1935 race, the event returned to Savannah in 1936.

=== Beach racing ===
Daytona Beach had been used by land speed record competitors since 1902 however, by 1935 the rutted beach course began losing its appeal in favor of the Bonneville Salt Flats. In an effort to boost the local economy, race promoter Bill France Sr. arranged for the Savannah 200 to be moved to the 3.2-mile (5.1 km) Daytona Beach Road Course in 1937. There were no races held between 1942 and 1946 due to wartime restrictions during the Second World War. In 1948, a new beach course was used because of urban developments along the beach forced the race organizers to move the event further south, towards Ponce Inlet. The new course length was increased from the previous 3.2 miles to 4.1-mile (6.6 km). By the mid-1950s, it became increasingly complicated to run the race on the beach course due to the rapid urban growth of the Daytona Beach area.

=== Move to the Daytona International Speedway ===
France looked for alternatives and negotiated with the city of Daytona Beach to purchase a site near the Daytona airport. He arranged financing and in 1957, construction began on the Daytona International Speedway, a 2.5-mile (4.0 km) paved, oval-shaped circuit with steep bankings that permitted higher speeds. The track opened in 1959 and France convinced AMA officials to move the beach race to the Speedway in 1961. Competitors adapted to the new, paved track surface by switching from dirt track motorcycles to road racing motorcycles similar to those used in Grand Prix motorcycle racing. Safety concerns kept motorcycle racers from using the daunting 31 degree banking at the Daytona International Speedway for the first three years so, a race course was created using most of the track infield along with the tri-oval section where the finish line is located in front of the spectator stands.

=== International prominence ===
Initially, the traditionalists who favored the old beach race stayed away from the new race at the Speedway and attendance in the early years suffered. However, France continued to promote the race and by the early 1970s, the Daytona 200 attracted the largest crowds of any AMA race and the event took on international prominence. The race became the centerpiece of what became known as Daytona Beach Bike Week, featuring motorcycle competitions besides road racing such as motocross and dirt track racing. Attending the annual event became known as a rite of spring for thousands of motorcyclists seeking to escape the colder northern climes. At the peak of the event's popularity in the early 1970s, chartered airliners were used to bring European race fans to Daytona Beach.

In 1969 Yvon Duhamel riding a Yamaha TD3 rode a lap on the speedway oval (which at the time was used for qualifying) to become the first rider to lap the oval on a motorcycle in under one minute (average speed over 150 mph). Duhamel's pole position on the tiny 350cc Yamaha motorcycle against the larger 750cc four-strokes marked the beginning of the two-stroke era in AMA road racing competitions. Don Emde became the first competitor to win the Daytona 200 on a two stroke motorcycle when he won the 1972 event riding a Yamaha TR3. His victory marked the beginning of thirteen consecutive Yamaha victories at the Daytona 200 including nine consecutive victories by the dominant Yamaha TZ750. Emde's 1972 victory marked the first father and son winners of the Daytona 200 as his father, Floyd Emde won the 1948 Daytona 200 beach race on an Indian.

When the popularity of motocross surged in the United States in the late 1960s, France added a professional motocross race to the 1971 Daytona Beach Bike Week schedule. The 1972 race was held at Daytona International Speedway on an artificial track on the grass surface between the main grandstand and the pit lane. The event paved the way for artificial, stadium-based motocross events known as supercross to be held in major league sports stadiums across the United States and Canada.

In 1973, the reigning 250cc world champion, Jarno Saarinen, became the first European rider to win the Daytona 200. The 1974 victory by 15-time world champion Giacomo Agostini helped cement the Daytona 200's reputation as one of the world's most prestigious motorcycle races. In 1975, an unknown rookie rider named Johnny Cecotto accomplished one of the most impressive performances in the history of the event when, he rode from last place on the starting grid to finish the race in third place, passing half the field of competitors on the first lap alone. The success of the Daytona 200 spawned imitations in Europe such as the Imola 200 and the Paul Ricard 200.

=== Safety issues and diminished status ===
As motorcycle engine technology transitioned from the 60 horsepower four-stroke motorcycles of the 1960s, to the 100 horsepower two-stroke motorcycles of the 1970s, it became apparent that motorcycle tire technology was lagging behind engine performance on the track's banking. In an effort to slow the fastest bikes down and save on tire wear, a chicane was added in 1973 at the end of the Daytona back straight. The dangers that motorcycle racers were exposed to was highlighted in 1975 when a documentary crew were filming as Barry Sheene crashed on the banked track at over 170 mph when his rear tire failed. As speeds continued to increase, organizers eventually replaced the high powered two stroke Grand Prix motorcycles with the Superbike Production class in 1985, which led to a global trend of Superbike racing that by 1988 would lead to the development of an FIM-sanctioned Superbike World Championship in 1988. The loss of Grand Prix machinery meant that fewer international competitors were interested in entering the race and, began a slow decline in the event's prestige.

By the late 1990s, even the production based Superbikes were overheating the tires on the banking. To keep Superbikes in the Daytona 200, the West Banking was eliminated to reduce the tire issues that had been plaguing the motorcycles. However, the owners of Daytona International Speedway were unsatisfied with the banking being omitted from the course so, a compromise was reached after the 2004 season reducing the size and power of the bikes by going to a Supersport-based class (known as "AMA Formula Xtreme"), and putting both bankings back into the race course. The Supersport class race kept the 200 miles (320 km) distance, but the Superbike race was converted to a standard 100 kilometers (62 mi) round of the national championship. In 2009, the Supersport class for this was renamed AMA Pro Daytona Sportbike Championship. The changes left spectators confused as to why the most powerful motorcycles were replaced by a lesser class in the premier Daytona race. The changes also meant that the top factory backed riders would be excluded from the race.

The race's future was clouded with the circuit's inability to negotiate with the Dorna-aligned Wayne Rainey KRAVE organization that organizes the MotoAmerica motorcycle racing series in the United States beginning in 2015 when MotoAmerica decided not to place Daytona on the 2015 schedule, considerably important since Daytona's 200 mile format was going against the grain of typical 110-km (68 mile) races that are typical of most Superbike races in the world, as MotoAmerica's future plans to adopt the Spanish CEV championship format of FIM Moto3 and Moto2 classes (the Spanish championship is also a Dorna-promoted championship, and most recent riders come from CEV to Moto3), went against the traditions of American motorcycle racing. On December 1, 2014, American Sportbike Racing Association, parent company of Championship Cup Series (CCS), which sanctions the Fall Cycle Scene autumn events at Daytona, agreed to sanction the Daytona 200 with Supersport motorcycles racing 57 laps on the full motorcycle layout.

Steve Rapp's 2007 victory was the first win for Kawasaki since 1995 and the first win for a privateer rider since John Ashmead won in 1989.

The race was cancelled in 2020 for the first time since World War II because of the COVID-19 pandemic after the Rudy Gobert incident took place during the Wednesday of the race meeting, and officials moved the entire race meeting to Biketoberfest with the Fall Cycle Scene at the Speedway. When the city cancelled Biketoberfest, the feature was cancelled, but not the remainder of the fall race meeting.

Conducted despite the pandemic, the 2021 race saw a thrilling finish line victory by rising star, American Brandon Paasch. Coming out of the final pit stop six seconds behind the race leader Sean Dylan Kelly, Paasch made a thrilling charge to catch the leader, with a daring pass at the finish line to win by 0.03 second.

For the 2022 edition, MotoAmerica replaced ASRA as the sanctioning body, with the race becoming a non-points race under updated Supersport rules. The race will become a full championship round in 2026 with Supersport as the featured class that weekend, the only MotoAmerica meeting that will not feature Superbikes.

The race has been one of the toughest in American motorcycling because of its endurance-like qualities of pit stops for tires and fuel, and safety car periods, and nine FIM world champions, including seven 500cc/MotoGP World Champions—six Americans and one Italian—have won the race. Of recent American world champions, only Kenny Roberts Jr. did not win the Daytona 200. Finnish and Venezuelan FIM world champions in smaller classes have also won the 200.

Scott Russell and Miguel Duhamel are tied for most Daytona 200 wins at five each. Russell, known by the nickname "Mr. Daytona" because of his achievements at the famed track, won all his Daytona races in the Superbike class (750-1000cc). Duhamel's fifth victory came in the Supersport-based classes beginning in 2005.

== Daytona 200 Winners ==
Year	Rider	Country	Manufacturer and Model	Team	Class	Course
1937	Ed Kretz	United States	Indian		--	3.2-mile (5.1 km) Daytona Beach Course
1938	Ben Campanale	United States	Harley-Davidson		--	3.2-mile (5.1 km) Daytona Beach Course
1939	Ben Campanale	United States	Harley-Davidson		--	3.2-mile (5.1 km) Daytona Beach Course
1940	Babe Tancrede	United States	Harley-Davidson		--	3.2-mile (5.1 km) Daytona Beach Course
1941	Billy Mathews	Canada	Norton		--	3.2-mile (5.1 km) Daytona Beach Course
1942–1946: Not held (World War II)
1947	John Spiegelhoff	United States	Indian		--	3.2-mile (5.1 km) Daytona Beach Course
1948	Floyd Emde	United States	Indian		--	4.1-mile (6.6 km) Daytona Beach Course
1949	Dick Klamfoth	United States	Norton		--	4.1-mile (6.6 km) Daytona Beach Course
1950	Billy Mathews	Canada	Norton		--	4.1-mile (6.6 km) Daytona Beach Course
1951	Dick Klamfoth	United States	Norton		--	4.1-mile (6.6 km) Daytona Beach Course
1952	Dick Klamfoth	United States	Norton		--	4.1-mile (6.6 km) Daytona Beach Course
1953	Paul Goldsmith	United States	Harley-Davidson		--	4.1-mile (6.6 km) Daytona Beach Course
1954	Bobby Hill	United States	BSA		--	4.1-mile (6.6 km) Daytona Beach Course
1955	Brad Andres	United States	Harley-Davidson		--	4.1-mile (6.6 km) Daytona Beach Course
1956	John Gibson	United States	Harley-Davidson		--	4.1-mile (6.6 km) Daytona Beach Course
1957	Joe Leonard	United States	Harley-Davidson		--	4.1-mile (6.6 km) Daytona Beach Course
1958	Joe Leonard	United States	Harley-Davidson		--	4.1-mile (6.6 km) Daytona Beach Course
1959	Brad Andres	United States	Harley-Davidson		--	4.1-mile (6.6 km) Daytona Beach Course
1960	Brad Andres	United States	Harley-Davidson		--	4.1-mile (6.6 km) Daytona Beach Course
1961	Roger Reiman	United States	Harley-Davidson		--	2-mile (3.2 km) Daytona Speedway/Infield Course
1962	Don Burnett	United States	Triumph		--	2-mile (3.2 km) Daytona Speedway/Infield Course
1963	Ralph White	United States	Harley-Davidson		--	2-mile (3.2 km) Daytona Speedway/Infield Course
1964	Roger Reiman	United States	Harley-Davidson		--	3.81-mile (6.13 km) Daytona Speedway/Infield Course
1965	Roger Reiman	United States	Harley-Davidson		--	3.81-mile (6.13 km) Daytona Speedway/Infield Course
1966	Buddy Elmore	United States	Triumph	Triumph Factory Team	--	3.81-mile (6.13 km) Daytona Speedway/Infield Course
1967	Gary Nixon	United States	Triumph	Triumph Factory Team	--	3.81-mile (6.13 km) Daytona Speedway/Infield Course
1968	Cal Rayborn	United States	Harley-Davidson	Harley-Davidson Factory Team	--	3.81-mile (6.13 km) Daytona Speedway/Infield Course
1969	Cal Rayborn	United States	Harley-Davidson	Harley-Davidson Factory Team	--	3.81-mile (6.13 km) Daytona Speedway/Infield Course
1970	Dick Mann	United States	Honda	Honda Factory Team	--	3.81-mile (6.13 km) Daytona Speedway/Infield Course
1971	Dick Mann	United States	BSA	BSA	--	3.81-mile (6.13 km) Daytona Speedway/Infield Course
1972	Don Emde	United States	Yamaha	Mel Dinesen	--	3.81-mile (6.13 km) Daytona Speedway/Infield Course
1973	Jarno Saarinen	Finland	Yamaha	Yamaha Motor Company	--	3.84-mile (6.18 km) Daytona Speedway/Infield Course
1974	Giacomo Agostini	Italy	Yamaha	Yamaha	--	3.84-mile (6.18 km) Daytona Speedway/Infield Course
1975	Gene Romero	United States	Yamaha	Yamaha USA	--	3.84-mile (6.18 km) Daytona Speedway/Infield Course
1976	Johnny Cecotto	Venezuela	Yamaha	Yamaha	--	3.87-mile (6.23 km) Daytona Speedway/Infield Course
1977	Steve Baker	United States	Yamaha	Yamaha of Canada	Formula 1	3.87-mile (6.23 km) Daytona Speedway/Infield Course
1978	Kenny Roberts	United States	Yamaha	Yamaha USA	Formula 1	3.87-mile (6.23 km) Daytona Speedway/Infield Course
1979	Dale Singleton	United States	Yamaha	Taylor White-Yamaha	Formula 1	3.87-mile (6.23 km) Daytona Speedway/Infield Course
1980	Patrick Pons	France	Yamaha	Yamaha of France	Formula 1	3.87-mile (6.23 km) Daytona Speedway/Infield Course
1981	Dale Singleton	United States	Yamaha	Taylor White-Yamaha	Formula 1	3.87-mile (6.23 km) Daytona Speedway/Infield Course
1982	Graeme Crosby	New Zealand	Yamaha	Yamaha	Formula 1	3.87-mile (6.23 km) Daytona Speedway/Infield Course
1983	Kenny Roberts	United States	Yamaha	Yamaha USA	Formula 1	3.87-mile (6.23 km) Daytona Speedway/Infield Course
1984	Kenny Roberts	United States	Yamaha	Yamaha USA	Formula 1	3.87-mile (6.23 km) Daytona Speedway/Infield Course
1985	Freddie Spencer	United States	Honda VF750F	American Honda	Superbike	3.56-mile (5.73 km) Daytona Speedway/Infield Course
1986	Eddie Lawson	United States	Yamaha FZ750	Yamaha	Superbike	3.56-mile (5.73 km) Daytona Speedway/Infield Course
1987	Wayne Rainey	United States	Honda VFR750F	American Honda	Superbike	3.56-mile (5.73 km) Daytona Speedway/Infield Course
1988	Kevin Schwantz	United States	Suzuki GSX-R750	Yoshimura Racing	Superbike	3.56-mile (5.73 km) Daytona Speedway/Infield Course
1989	John Ashmead	United States	Honda VFR750F	Privateer	Superbike	3.56-mile (5.73 km) Daytona Speedway/Infield Course
1990	David Sadowski	United States	Yamaha FZR750RR (OW01)	Vance & Hines	Superbike	3.56-mile (5.73 km) Daytona Speedway/Infield Course
1991	Miguel Duhamel	Canada	Honda VFR750R (RC30)	Commonwealth Racing	Superbike	3.56-mile (5.73 km) Daytona Speedway/Infield Course
1992	Scott Russell	United States	Kawasaki ZX-7R	Team Muzzy	Superbike	3.56-mile (5.73 km) Daytona Speedway/Infield Course
1993	Eddie Lawson	United States	Yamaha FZR750RR (OW01)	Vance & Hines	Superbike	3.56-mile (5.73 km) Daytona Speedway/Infield Course
1994	Scott Russell	United States	Kawasaki ZX-7R	Team Muzzy	Superbike	3.56-mile (5.73 km) Daytona Speedway/Infield Course
1995	Scott Russell	United States	Kawasaki ZX-7R	Team Muzzy	Superbike	3.56-mile (5.73 km) Daytona Speedway/Infield Course
1996	Miguel Duhamel	Canada	Honda RVF750R (RC45)	Commonwealth Racing	Superbike	3.56-mile (5.73 km) Daytona Speedway/Infield Course
1997	Scott Russell	United States	Yamaha YZF750	Yamaha	Superbike	3.56-mile (5.73 km) Daytona Speedway/Infield Course
1998	Scott Russell	United States	Yamaha YZF750	Yamaha	Superbike	3.56-mile (5.73 km) Daytona Speedway/Infield Course
1999	Miguel Duhamel	Canada	Honda RVF750R (RC45)	American Honda	Superbike	3.56-mile (5.73 km) Daytona Speedway/Infield Course
2000	Mat Mladin	Australia	Suzuki GSXR-750	Yoshimura-American Suzuki	Superbike	3.56-mile (5.73 km) Daytona Speedway/Infield Course
2001	Mat Mladin	Australia	Suzuki GSXR-750	Yoshimura-American Suzuki	Superbike	3.56-mile (5.73 km) Daytona Speedway/Infield Course
2002	Nicky Hayden	United States	Honda RVT1000R	American Honda	Superbike	3.56-mile (5.73 km) Daytona Speedway/Infield Course
2003	Miguel Duhamel	Canada	Honda RVT1000R	American Honda	Superbike	3.56-mile (5.73 km) Daytona Speedway/Infield Course
2004	Mat Mladin	Australia	Suzuki GSX-R1000	Yoshimura-American Suzuki	Superbike	3.56-mile (5.73 km) Daytona Speedway/Infield Course
2005	Miguel Duhamel	Canada	Honda CBR600RR	American Honda	Formula Xtreme	2.95-mile (4.75 km) Daytona Speedway/Infield Course
2006	Jake Zemke	United States	Honda CBR600RR	American Honda	Formula Xtreme	2.95-mile (4.75 km) Daytona Speedway/Infield Course
2007	Steve Rapp	United States	Kawasaki ZX6R	Attack Performance	Formula Xtreme	2.95-mile (4.75 km) Daytona Speedway/Infield Course
2008	Chaz Davies (Note: The 2008 race was won by Josh Hayes, who was later disqualified for an illegal crankshaft. Second place finisher, Chaz Davies, became the official winner and first racer from the United Kingdom to win the Daytona 200. Honda appealed the result but on April 4, 2008, the AMA informed Erion Honda they were denying the appeal.)	United Kingdom	Kawasaki ZX6R	Attack Performance	Formula Xtreme	2.90-mile (4.67 km) Daytona Speedway/Infield Course
2009	Ben Bostrom	United States	Yamaha YZF-R6	Graves Yamaha	Daytona SportBike	3.51-mile (5.65 km) Daytona Speedway/Infield Course
2010	Josh Herrin	United States	Yamaha YZF-R6	Graves Yamaha	Daytona SportBike	3.51-mile (5.65 km) Daytona Speedway/Infield Course
2011 (Note: The 2011 race was shortened to 42 green flag laps / 147.42 miles (237.25 km), with the two red flags caused by tire issues, and the three ensuing warm-up laps (two before first Lap 27 restart, one after a crash on that restart led to a second Lap 27 restart); a total of 45 laps (157.95 miles (254.20 km)) were run. AMA Pro Racing shortened the race because of tire and darkness issues.)	Jason DiSalvo	United States	Ducati 848 Evo	Latus Motors	Daytona SportBike	3.51-mile (5.65 km) Daytona Speedway/Infield Course
2012	Joey Pascarella	United States	Yamaha YZF-R6	Project 1 Atlanta	Daytona SportBike	3.51-mile (5.65 km) Daytona Speedway/Infield Course
2013	Cameron Beaubier	United States	Yamaha YZF-R6	Graves Yamaha	Daytona SportBike	3.51-mile (5.65 km) Daytona Speedway/Infield Course
2014	Danny Eslick	United States	Triumph Daytona 675	Riders Discount Racing	Daytona SportBike	3.51-mile (5.65 km) Daytona Speedway/Infield Course
2015	Danny Eslick	United States	Suzuki GSX-R600	TOBC Racing	Daytona SportBike	3.51-mile (5.65 km) Daytona Speedway/Infield Course
2016	Michael Barnes	United States	Yamaha YZF-R6	Palm Beach Police Foundation/Prieto Performance	Daytona SportBike	3.51-mile (5.65 km) Daytona Speedway/Infield Course
2017	Danny Eslick	United States	Yamaha YZF-R6	TOBC Racing	Daytona SportBike	3.51-mile (5.65 km) Daytona Speedway/Infield Course
2018	Danny Eslick	United States	Yamaha YZF-R6	TOBC Racing	Daytona SportBike	3.51-mile (5.65 km) Daytona Speedway/Infield Course
2019	Kyle Wyman	United States	Yamaha YZF-R6	N2 Racing/BobbleHeadMoto/KWR	Daytona SportBike	3.51-mile (5.65 km) Daytona Speedway/Infield Course
2020: Abandoned after qualifying (COVID-19 pandemic). Josh Herrin won pole.						3.51-mile (5.65 km) Daytona Speedway/Infield Course.
2021	Brandon Paasch	United States	Yamaha	TSE Racing	Daytona SportBike	3.51-mile (5.65 km) Daytona Speedway/Infield Course
2022	Brandon Paasch	United States	Triumph	TOBC Racing Triumph	Supersport	3.51-mile (5.65 km) Daytona Speedway/Infield Course
2023 (Note: The 2023 race was extended to 63 laps (221.13 miles (355.87 km), because of a late race red flag and overtime rules in effect. Under MotoAmerica Sporting Regulations, as the race was red-flagged on Lap 53, after 52 laps were completed when a red flag occurred for a crash, rules in effect for incidents between Lap 4 and 53 were in effect. The ensuing restart is a minimum of ten laps. One unscored warm-up lap is counted in the overall 63 laps. Had the race incident occurred on Lap 54, the race would have ended after 53 laps.)	Josh Herrin	United States	Ducati	Warhorse HSBK Racing Ducati NYC	Supersport	3.51-mile (5.65 km) Daytona Speedway/Infield Course
2024	Josh Herrin	United States	Ducati	Warhorse HSBK Racing Ducati	Supersport	3.51-mile (5.65 km) Daytona Speedway/Infield Course
2025	Josh Herrin	United States	Ducati	Warhorse HSBK Racing Ducati	Supersport	3.51-mile (5.65 km) Daytona Speedway/Infield Course
2026	Josh Herrin	United States	Ducati	Rahal Ducati Moto with Desnuda Organic Tequila	Supersport	3.51-mile (5.65 km) Daytona Speedway/Infield Course

== Winners ==
Brand	Number of victories	Last victories
(Italy) Ducati	5	2026
(Japan) Yamaha	26	2021
(United Kingdom) Triumph	5	2022
(Japan) Kawasaki	5	2008
(United Kingdom) BSA	2	1971
(United States) Harley-Davidson	16	1969
(Japan) Honda	11	2006
(United States) Indian	3	1948
(United Kingdom) Norton	5	1952
(Japan) Suzuki	5	2015

== See also ==
- Daytona Beach Bike Week
- Daytona 500, NASCAR's equivalent, but longer
- Imola 200, former European equivalent
