= Jason Pridmore =

American motorcycle racer (born 1969)

Jason Pridmore (born October 4, 1969 in Goleta, California) is a retired American professional motorcycle racer who turned professional in 1990. He last raced professionally in the 2014 FIM World Endurance Championship on a BMW S1000RR for Team Penz 13. His professional career spanned 22 years, during which he won 21 American Motorcyclist Association (AMA) national races 17 of which are Superstock class wins (Formerly Supersport) which is second to Scott Russell. Pridmore was the AMA Formula Extreme Championship in 2002, the AMA 750 Supersport Championship in 1997 as well as the FIM Endurance World Championship title in 2003 & 2012 respectively. In addition to his professional racing career, Pridmore instructs motorcyclists through his STAR Motorcycle school and JP43 Training programs. Pridmore also spends time as an expert analyst for Bein Sports coverage of the Moto America championships.

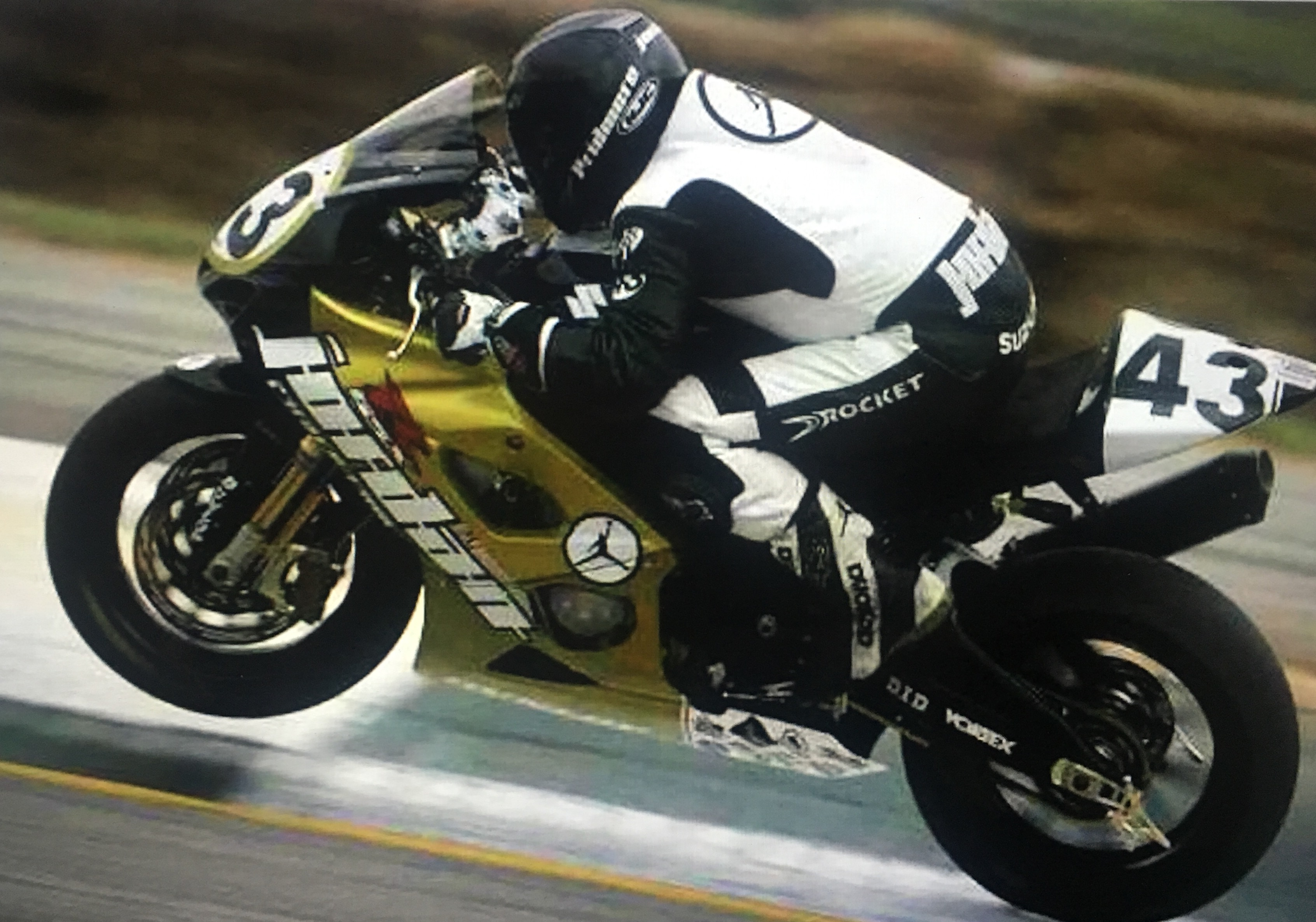
Pridmore riding for Michael Jordan Motorsports in 2005

== Coaching career ==
Pridmore began coaching riders at his father's CLASS Motorcycle Schools when he was 16 years old. While racing professionally, Pridmore mentored some of his younger teammates including Ben Spies, Nicky Hayden and Danny Eslick. His passion for sharing his knowledge led Pridmore to found STAR Motorcycle School in 1999 which he continues to run today.

=== STAR Motorcycle School ===
Through STAR (Skills and Tactics for Advanced Riding), Pridmore has coached thousands of riders of varying levels ranging from beginners, trackday enthusiasts, amateur club racers as well as aspiring professionals. The school has travelled extensively across the country to some of the nations finest race tracks. Currently, STAR School operates out of Chuckwalla Valley Raceway in Desert Center, CA.

=== JP43 Training ===
Post retirement, Pridmore began working extensively with both professional and club level riders in a 1-on-1 setting which has led to several noteworthy accomplishments. James Rispoli who came to road racing at a later age than most professionals won the AMA Supersport championship in 2011 and 2012 under Pridmore's tutelage. He continued onto international competition first by being offered a wildcard into the Moto 2 World Championship in 2013 and currently races in the British Superbike Championship. Corey Alexander won the 2013 AMA Supersport Championship and went on to race in the FIM World Supersport Championship in 2013. Other successful professional riders that Pridmore has worked with on a 1-on-1 basis include Benny Solis, Michael Gilbert, Elena Meyers, Caroline Olsen, Andrew Lee, Wyatt Farris, Conner Blevins and Patricia Fernandez. His 1-on-1 training sessions are not limited to professional riders, Pridmore trains trackday enthusiasts as well as competitive club racers out of Chuckwalla Valley Raceway and also travels to racetracks nationally and internationally to work with riders.

=== Military Coaching ===
Through STAR Motorcycle as well as his individual programs, Pridmore has trained thousands of US Military servicemen and servicewomen to be safer on their motorcycles. He conducts training both on military bases as well as on race tracks for the Marines and National Guard. Pridmore is an official instructor for the United States Marines Semper Ride program which has helped reduce US Marine incidents on motorcycles by over 46%.

== Racing career ==
Pridmore first raced professionally in 1990 in the AMA 750 Superstock Championship. He continued racing in various AMA championships including AMA 600 Supersport, AMA Formula Xtreme and AMA Superbike. Pridmore competed at the international level in the World Superbike Championship in 2008, the FIM World Supersport Championship in 2003 and most extensively in the FIM World Endurance Championship on and off between 1997 & 2014.

=== Career highlights ===
- 2012 - Co-rode for the FIM Endurance World Championship winning team.
- 2008 - Competed in five rounds of the 2008 Superbike World Championship on a Honda 1000cc machine for the Alto Evolution team.
- 2003 - Became the first American make it to the podium of a World Supersport Race. Won the FIM Endurance World Championship with Phase One Endurance team partnered with James Ellison as his teammate.
- 2002 - Won the AMA Formula Xtreme Championship for Attack Suzuki.
- 1997 - Won the 750 Supersport class championship riding for Hypercycle Suzuki.
- 1996 - Six top-five finishes in 600 SuperSport, Five top-10 750cc SuperSport finishes
- 1992 - Won his first race as a professional At Brainerd, Minn., while handing Scott Russell his first defeat in three years. He again upset Russell with a come-from-behind victory at Road Atlanta two weeks later.

== Personal life ==
Pridmore is the son of three time AMA Superbike champion Reg Pridmore. He was raised and currently resides in Ventura, California. He is an avid Golfer and has competed in the US National Amateur Championship as well as the qualifying rounds for the US Open.

=== AMA Career by Year ===
Year	Class	Finish	Team	Bike	Teammate(s)
2005	Superbike / Superstock	17th / 19th	Michael Jordan Motorsports	Suzuki 1000cc	Steve Rapp / Montez Stuart
2004	Superstock / Formula Xtreme	11th / 6th	No Limit Motorsports	Suzuki 1000cc	Josh Hayes
2003	Superbike / Formula Xtreme	8th / 9th	Attack Suzuki	Suzuki 1000cc	Josh Hayes
2002	600 Supersport / Formula Xtreme	4th / 1st	Attack Suzuki	Suzuki 600cc / Suzuki 1000cc	Ben Spies
2001	750 Supersport / Formula Xtreme	28th / 10th	Attack Suzuki	Suzuki 750cc / Suzuki 1000cc	Richie Alexander
2000	600 Supersport / 750 Superbike	7th / 12th	Yoshimura Suzuki	Suzuki 600cc / Suzuki 750cc	Matt Mladin, Aaron Yates, Steve Rapp
1999	600 Supersport / 750 Superbike	10th / 6th	Yoshimura Suzuki	Suzuki 600cc / Suzuki 750cc	Matt Mladin, Aaron Yates, Steve Rapp
1998	600 Supersport / 750 Supersport	6th / 8th	Hypercycle	Suzuki 600cc / Suzuki 750cc	Nicky Hayden
1997	600 Supersport / 750 Supersport	5th / 1st	Hypercycle	Suzuki 600cc / Suzuki 750cc	Mark Miller
1996	600 Supersport / 750 Supersport	9th / 11th	Kinkos Racing	Kawasaki 600cc / Kawasaki 750cc	Thomas Stevens
1994	600 Supersport / 750 Supersport	6th / 3rd	Kinkos Racing	Yamaha 600cc / Yamaha 750cc	Tommy Wilson
1993	600 Supersport / 750 Supersport	7th / 4th	CLASS Racing	Kawasaki 600cc / Kawasaki 750cc	Fritz Kling
1992	600 Supersport / 750 Supersport	22nd / 2nd	CLASS Racing	Kawasaki 600cc / Kawasaki 750cc	Fritz Kling
1991	750 Supersport	20th	CLASS Racing	Kawasaki 750cc	Fritz Kling
1990	750 Supersport	44th	CLASS Racing	Kawasaki 750cc	Fritz Kling

=== AMA Career Race Wins ===
Date	Class	Race Track	Location	Bike
June 9, 2002	AMA Formula Xtreme	Road America	Elkhart Lake, WI	Suzuki
June 1, 2002	AMA Formula Xtreme	Pikes Peak International Raceway	Fountain, CO	Suzuki
May 5, 2001	AMA Formula Xtreme	Infineon Raceway	Sonoma, CA	Suzuki
March 9, 2001	750 Supersport	Daytona International Speedway	Daytona Beach, FL	Suzuki
August 25, 2001	AMA Formula Xtreme	Pikes Peak International Raceway	Fountain, CO	Suzuki
May 3, 1998	750 Supersport	Sears Point Raceway	Sonoma, CA	Suzuki
June 21, 1998	750 Supersport	New Hampshire Motor Speedway	Loudon, NH	Suzuki
June 14, 1998	750 Supersport	Road America	Elkhart Lake, WI	Suzuki
February 15, 1998	750 Supersport	Phoenix International Raceway	Phoenix, AZ	Suzuki
October 4, 1997	750 Supersport	Las Vegas Motor Speedway	Las Vegas, NV	Suzuki
March 7, 1997	750 Supersport	Daytona International Speedway	Daytona Beach, FL	Suzuki
June 28, 1997	750 Supersport	Brainerd International Raceway	Brainerd, MN	Suzuki
June 14, 1997	750 Supersport	New Hampshire Motor Speedway	Loudon, NH	Suzuki
July 19, 1997	750 Supersport	Mid-Ohio Sports Car Course	Lexington, OH	Suzuki
February 15, 1997	750 Supersport	Phoenix International Raceway	Phoenix, AZ	Suzuki
August 30, 1997	750 Supersport	Sears Point Raceway	Sonoma, CA	Suzuki
August 16, 1997	750 Supersport	Pikes Peak International Raceway	Fountain, CO	Suzuki
August 7, 1993	750 Supersport	Mid-Ohio Sports Car Course	Lexington, OH	Kawasaki
August 28, 1993	750 Supersport	Sears Point Raceway	Sonoma, CA	Kawasaki
June 27, 1992	750 Supersport	Road America	Elkhart Lake, WI	Kawasaki
June 13, 1992	750 Supersport	Brainerd International Raceway	Brainerd, MN	Kawasaki

=== MotoAmerica Superstock Championship ===
==== By year ====
Year	Class	Bike	1	2	3	4	5	6	7	8	9	10	11	Pos	Pts
2004	Superstock	Suzuki	DAY; 14	FON; 9	INF	BAR; 12	PPK; 5	RAM; 8	BRD; 21	LAG; 8	M-O; 6	RAT; 20	VIR; 10	11th	197
2005	Superstock	Suzuki	DAY; 3	BAR; Ret	FON	INF	PPK	RAM	LAG; 11	M-O; 6	VIR; 8	RAT; 8		19th	120
2006	Superstock	Suzuki	DAY; 9	BAR; 10	FON; 7	INF; 11	RAM; 7	MIL; Ret	LAG; 8	OHI; Ret	VIR; 20	RAT	OHI	17th	145

=== AMA Formula Xtreme Championship ===
==== By year ====
Year	Class	Bike	1	2	3	4	5	6	7	8	9	10	11	Pos	Pts
2004	Formula Xtreme	Suzuki	DAY; Ret	FON; 3	INF; 6	BAR; 5	PPK; 5	RAM; Ret	BRD; Ret	LAG; 7	M-O; 2	RAT; 4	VIR; 21	6th	199

=== AMA Superbike Championship ===
Year	Class	Team	1		2		3		4		5		6		7	8		9		10		11		Pos	Pts
Year	Class	Team	R1	R2	R1	R2	R1	R2	R1	R2	R1	R2	R1	R2	R1	R1	R2	R1	R2	R1	R2	R1	R2	Pos	Pts
2005	SuperBike	Suzuki	DAY; 7		BAR; 6	BAR; Ret	FON	FON	INF	INF	PPK		RAM	RAM	LAG; 10	M-O; 8	M-O; 7	VIR; 27	VIR; 8	RAT; 7	RAT; 7			17th	192
2006	SuperBike	Suzuki	DAY; 9		BAR; 10	BAR; 10	FON; 9	FON; 9	INF; 11	INF; 11	RAM; 9	RAM; 9	MIL; 9	MIL; 8	LAG; 9	OHI; 30	OHI; 6	VIR; 7	VIR; 8	RAT; 8	RAT; 12	OHI; 5		8th	400
2008	SuperBike	Suzuki	DAY		BAR	BAR	FON	FON	INF; 17	INF; Ret	MIL	MIL	RAM	RAM	LAG	OHI	OHI	VIR	VIR	RAT	RAT	LAG		38th	14
2010	SuperBike	Suzuki	DAY	DAY	FON	FON	RAT	RAT	INF	INF	RAM	RAM	MOH	MOH	LAG; 14	VIR	VIR	NJE	NJE	BAR	BAR			41st	7

=== FIM Endurance World Championship ===
==== By team ====
Year	Team	Bike	Rider	TC
2004	(United Kingdom) Suzuki GB - Phase One	Suzuki GSX-R1000	(United Kingdom) James Ellison (United States) Jason Pridmore (United Kingdom) Andy Notman (United Kingdom) Dean Ellison (United States) Josh Hayes (France) Olivier Four (Sweden) Jimmy Lindstrom	1st
