= AMA Formula Xtreme =

American professional motorcycle class

Formula Xtreme was a professional racing class sanctioned by the American Motorcyclist Association. Formula Xtreme was part of the AMA's road racing series, which also included AMA Superbike Championship, AMA Supersport Championship, and AMA Superstock.

== Rules ==
Motorcycles were homologated and had to be of a model type that was designed and legal for street use in the United States and was available from retail dealerships in the U.S. Although liberal by the standards of other classes AMA road racing series, Formula Xtreme rules still limited the modifications that may have been made. The rules specified what changes were and were not permitted, including modification or replacement of various engine internals, transmission components, and other non-powertrain components of the vehicle such as the suspension, wheels, frame, swingarm, bodywork, wheels, etc. The rules also specified minimum weight limits, allowable fuel types, which production components had to be left in place and rules for availability of non-stock components from the manufacturer.

Lastly, the type of engine (displacement and configuration) was governed by a set of guidelines that attempted to bring technical diversity to the class by establishing technical limitations that allowed different technologies to remain competitive. For example, air/oil-cooled twin-cylinder engines were allowed a larger displacement limit. There were also differences in allowed modifications to engine internals depending on the engine configuration, again to encourage technical diversity in the class by ensuring that motorcycles with different engine configurations remained competitive.

Merrill Vanderslice, AMA Pro Racing's Director of Competition, stated:

By design, Formula Xtreme rules are the most liberal of all the classes within the AMA Superbike Championship...The intent of the Formula Xtreme class is to include a diverse group of motorcycles...

== Manufacturers represented ==
Manufacturers represented in the AMA Formula Xtreme Series included the Big Four; Honda, Kawasaki, Suzuki and Yamaha, and in 2008 BMW, Ducati, Triumph and Buell were represented as well. Perhaps the most well known event on the annual Formula Xtreme calendar was the Daytona 200, which was not only the inaugural event of the Formula Xtreme season each year, but was also the longest event on the Formula Xtreme calendar (in terms of distance and number of laps).

With Daytona Motorsports Group's takeover of AMA Pro Racing in 2009, Formula Xtreme was replaced with the Daytona Sportbike class.

== Champions ==
Season	Champion	Machine
1997	(New Zealand) Andrew Stroud	Honda
1998	(United States) Eric Bostrom	Honda
1999	(United States) Kurtis Roberts	Honda
2000	(United States) Kurtis Roberts	Honda
2001	(United States) John Hopkins	Suzuki
2002	(United States) Jason Pridmore	Suzuki
2003	(United States) Ben Spies	Suzuki
2004	(Canada) Miguel Duhamel	Honda
2005	(Canada) Miguel Duhamel	Honda
2006	(United States) Josh Hayes	Honda
2007	(United States) Josh Hayes	Honda
2008	(United States) Jake Zemke	Honda
