= Patricia Fernandez =

Patricia Fernandez may refer to:

- Patricia Fernandez (actress), Filipino TV host, actress, model, and beauty pageant winner
- Patricia Fernández, Spanish-born Los Angeles–based artist
- Patricia Fernandez (motorcyclist), American motorcycle racer
