= 2005 AMA Superbike Championship =

AMA Superbike Championship

Seasons
- ← 2004 2006 →

The 2005 AMA Superbike Championship is the 30th season of the AMA Superbike Championship

== Season calendar ==
No	Date	Round/Circuit	Superstock Race Winner	FX Race Winner	Supersport Race Winner
1	March 9–12	(Florida) Daytona	(Czech Republic) Vincent Haskovec	(Canada) Miguel Duhamel	(United States) Tommy Hayden
2	April 22–24	(Alabama) Barber	(United States) Tommy Hayden	(United States) Jake Zemke	(United States) Jamie Hacking
3	April 29-May 1	(California) Fontana	(United States) Jason DiSalvo	(United States) Jake Zemke	(United States) Jamie Hacking
4	May 13–15	(California) Infineon	(United States) Aaron Yates	(United States) Jake Zemke	(United States) Tommy Hayden
5	May 21–22	(Colorado) Pikes Peak	(United States) Jamie Hacking	(United States) Jake Zemke	(United States) Roger Lee Hayden
6	June 3–5	(Wisconsin) Road America	(United States) Aaron Yates	(Canada) Miguel Duhamel	(United States) Tommy Hayden
7	July 8–10	(California) Laguna Seca	(United States) Aaron Yates	-	(United States) Jason DiSalvo
8	August 4–6	Mid-Ohio	(United States) Aaron Yates	(United States) Jake Zemke	(United States) Roger Lee Hayden
9	August 26–28	(Virginia) VIR	(United States) Aaron Yates	(Canada) Miguel Duhamel	(United States) Roger Lee Hayden
10	September 2–4	(Georgia (U.S. state)) Road Atlanta	(United States) Roger Lee Hayden	(Canada) Miguel Duhamel	(United States) Roger Lee Hayden

== Superbike Season Calendar ==
No		Round/Circuit	Date	Pole position	Fastest lap	Winner
1	R1	(Florida) Daytona	March 9–12	(Australia) Mat Mladin	(Australia) Mat Mladin	(Australia) Mat Mladin
2	R1	(Alabama) Barber	April 22–24	(Australia) Mat Mladin	(Australia) Mat Mladin	(Australia) Mat Mladin
2	R2	(Alabama) Barber	April 22–24	(Australia) Mat Mladin	(Australia) Mat Mladin	(Australia) Mat Mladin
3	R1	(California) Fontana	April 29-May 1	(Australia) Mat Mladin	(Australia) Mat Mladin	(United States) Ben Spies
3	R2	(California) Fontana	April 29-May 1	(Australia) Mat Mladin	(United States) Ben Spies	(Australia) Mat Mladin
4	R1	(California) Infineon	May 13–15	(Australia) Mat Mladin	(Australia) Mat Mladin	(Australia) Mat Mladin
4	R2	(California) Infineon	May 13–15	(Australia) Mat Mladin	(Australia) Mat Mladin	(Australia) Mat Mladin
5	R1	(Colorado) Pikes Peak	May 21–22	(Australia) Mat Mladin	(United States) Eric Bostrom	(United States) Eric Bostrom
6	R1	(Wisconsin) Road America	June 3–5	(Australia) Mat Mladin	(United States) Ben Spies	(United Kingdom) Neil Hodgson
6	R2	(Wisconsin) Road America	June 3–5	(Australia) Mat Mladin	(Australia) Mat Mladin	(Australia) Mat Mladin
7	R1	(California) Laguna Seca	July 8–10	(Australia) Mat Mladin	(Australia) Mat Mladin	(United States) Eric Bostrom
8	R1	Mid-Ohio	August 4–6	(Australia) Mat Mladin	(Australia) Mat Mladin	(Australia) Mat Mladin
8	R2	Mid-Ohio	August 4–6	(Australia) Mat Mladin	(Australia) Mat Mladin	(United States) Eric Bostrom
9	R1	(Virginia) VIR	August 26–28	(Australia) Mat Mladin	(Australia) Mat Mladin	(Australia) Mat Mladin
9	R2	(Virginia) VIR	August 26–28	(Australia) Mat Mladin	(Australia) Mat Mladin	(Australia) Mat Mladin
10	R1	(Georgia (U.S. state)) Road Atlanta	September 2–4	(Australia) Mat Mladin	(Canada) Miguel Duhamel	(Australia) Mat Mladin
10	R2	(Georgia (U.S. state)) Road Atlanta	September 2–4	(Australia) Mat Mladin	(United States) Aaron Yates	(United States) Aaron Yates

== AMA Superbike ==
=== Rider Standings ===
Pos	Rider	Bike	DAY (Florida)	BAR (Alabama)		FON (California)		INF (California)		PPK (Colorado)	RAM (Wisconsin)		LAG (California)	M-O (Ohio)		VIR (Virginia)		RAT (Georgia (U.S. state))		Pts
Pos	Rider	Bike	R1	R1	R2	R1	R2	R1	R2	R1	R1	R2	R1	R1	R2	R1	R2	R1	R2	Pts
1	(Australia) Mat Mladin	Suzuki	1	1	1	29	1	1	1	4	2	1	2	1	30	1	1	1	4	536
2	(United States) Ben Spies	Suzuki	3	3	3	1	2	4	3	3	4	2	4	2	3	2	3	2	2	514
3	(United States) Eric Bostrom	Ducati	11	8	5	5	4	10	7	1	Ret	4	1	3	1	6	7	5	8	431
4	(United States) Aaron Yates	Suzuki	4	2	8	2	3	2	2	2	Ret	5	3	Ret	9	3	2	Ret	1	414
5	(Canada) Miguel Duhamel	Honda	6	5	4	4	18	25	6	9	7	22	6	4	2	5	4	3	9	392
6	(United Kingdom) Neil Hodgson	Ducati	2	4	2	3	5	3	5	Ret	1	19	Ret	5	4	Ret	5	4	3	384
7	(Australia) Martin Craggill	Suzuki	14	10	9	9	8	9	9	20	5	Ret	11	10	11	8	11	9	12	331
8	(United States) Steve Rapp	Suzuki	10	7	Ret	8	7	6	Ret	6	Ret	8	8	18	6	11	9	15	10	305
9	(United States) Josh Hayes	Kawasaki	Ret	Ret	6	7	Ret	5	8	5	3	6	Ret	6	Ret	7	6	6	6	302
10	(United States) Lee Acree	Suzuki	16	13	11	14	12	13	13	15	6	9	17	14	14	10	13	10	16	301
11	(United States) Jake Zemke	Honda	5	Ret	Ret	6	6	20	4	13	6	3	5	Ret	Ret	4	Ret	Ret	5	265
12	(United States) Eric Wood	Suzuki	15	16	15	15	13	18	12	14	29	14	23	17	16	Ret	14	17	14	233
13	(United States) Scott Jensen	Suzuki	Ret	18	16	16	16	15	14	22	15	17	20	13	15	16	16	18	18	231
14	(United States) Larry Pegram	Honda	13	12	17	Ret	10	8	10	16	8	26	12	11	10	DNS	DNS			219
15	(United States) Cory West	Suzuki	23	19	21	29	15	14	15	12	Ret	12	18	19	13	12	10			201
16	(United States) Kurtis Roberts	Honda	9	Ret	Ret	12	Ret	12	Ret	27	20	7	7	7	5	Ret	30	8	Ret	197
16	(United States) Jason Pridmore	Suzuki	7	6	Ret								10	8	7	27	8	7	7	192
18	(United States) Jimmy Moore	Suzuki	18	20	20	17	19	19	16	17	18	11	16	Ret	19	Ret	19	23	Ret	182
19	(United States) Jake Holden	Suzuki	12	Ret	Ret	11	11	7	Ret	Ret	13	Ret	9	9	8	Ret	Ret			168
20	(United States) Jeremy Toye	Honda	22	29	Ret	Ret	25	16	18	Ret	17	15	14	12	12	9	Ret	Ret	17	166
21	(United States) Brent George	Suzuki	19	17	14	20	20	Ret	Ret	10	29	Ret	21	16	Ret	15	Ret	14	15	162
22	(United States) John Haner	Suzuki	21	Ret	10	29	14	Ret	Ret	8	9	Ret	13	Ret	Ret	Ret	28	13	13	152
23	(Canada) Clint McBain	Suzuki				18	9	11	11		12	10	19							127
24	(United States) JJ Roetlin	Suzuki	24	21	18	21	22	Ret	19	29	21	23	25	Ret	20	19	27	26	23	126
25	(Japan) Akira Tamitsuji	Suzuki						28	25		10	13	24			17	17	19	19	107
26	(United States) Tony Meiring	Suzuki	17	Ret	19	19	Ret	Ret	Ret		14	Ret	15	Ret	18	28	21	Ret	Ret	97
27	(United States) Jason Perez	Yamaha									DNS	DNS		15	21	13	15	16	11	95
28	(United States) Dean Mizdal	Suzuki	27	Ret	26	Ret	28	23	22	26	Ret	18	Ret	23	26	26	24	28	25	81
29	(United States) Brian Stokes	Yamaha	Ret	Ret	22									24	24	14	12	12	Ret	78
30	(United States) David Bell	Suzuki		27	23	25	27	Ret	Ret		26	21	29	28	27	22	23	25	Ret	69

== AMA Superstock ==
=== Rider Standings ===
Pos	Rider	Bike	DAY (Florida)	BAR (Alabama)	FON (California)	INF (California)	PPK (Colorado)	RAM (Wisconsin)	LAG (California)	M-O (Ohio)	VIR (Virginia)	RAT (Georgia (U.S. state))	Pts
Pos	Rider	Bike	R1	R1	R1	R1	R1	R1	R1	R1	R1	R1	Pts
1	(United States) Aaron Yates	Suzuki	2	3	10	1	2	1	1	1	1	9	323
2	(United States) Jason DiSalvo	Yamaha	5	2	1	3	4	3	2	2	3	2	314
3	(United States) Steve Rapp	Suzuki	8	6	3	4	6	8	6	3	7	6	255
4	(United States) Roger Lee Hayden	Kawasaki	11	8	Ret	7	7	4	3	5	2	1	241
5	(United States) John Haner	Suzuki	14	11	7	9	8	11	5	9	9	5	222
6	(United States) Jake Holden	Suzuki	10	10	8	8	10	10	4	4	20		195
7	(Australia) Damon Buckmaster	Yamaha	Ret	9	16	10	19	9	8	8	4	4	192
8	(United States) Geoff May	Suzuki	6	Ret	18	11	9	2	Ret	10	5	3	189
9	(Australia) Aaron Gobert	Yamaha	Ret	7	6	6	11	7	7	11	6		187
10	(United States) Tommy Hayden	Kawasaki	7	1	4	5	3	5	Ret				168
11	(United States) Eric Wood	Suzuki	16	12	8	12	18	14	Ret	13	11	11	163
12	(United States) Lee Acree	Suzuki	13	15	13	20	13	13	14	15	21	14	159
13	(United States) Jamie Hacking	Yamaha	4	4	2	2	1						156
14	(United States) Jimmy Moore	Suzuki	20	20	17	13	14	12	10	16	18	20	150
15	(United States) Blake Young	Suzuki	15	19	12	16	16	15	16	Ret	13	15	142
16	(United States) Michael Barnes	Suzuki					5	6	20	7	10	7	131
17	(United States) JJ Roetlin	Suzuki	17	16	19	15	15	17	22	18	24	21	126
18	(United States) Brent George	Suzuki	9	14	15	14	12	Ret	9	Ret	Ret	12	125
19	(United States) Jason Pridmore	Suzuki	3	Ret					11	6	8	8	120
20	(United States) Jason Perez	Yamaha	12					16	13	14	14	10	107
21	(United States) Tony Meiring	Suzuki	18	18	Ret			27	12	12	15	12	103
22	(Czech Republic) Vincent Haskovec	Suzuki	1	5	5	DNS							88
23	(Japan) Akira Tamitsuji	Suzuki			20	17	17	Ret	17		16	13	86
24	(United States) Matt Lynn	Suzuki	19	Ret	14				21	27	12	16	77
25	(United States) Chris Ulrich	Suzuki		17	Ret				18	17	19	17	67
26	(United States) Montez Stewart	Suzuki	Ret	23	26	27	22	18	23	21	Ret	27	61
27	(United States) Mark Miller	Suzuki				19			15			18	41
28	(United States) James Kerker	Honda	21						24	19		23	37
29	(United States) Reno Karimian	Suzuki	26	25	21	Ret	21		25				37
30	(United States) Jeremy Haiduk	Yamaha	29		Ret	Ret	26	19	30	24	23		35
31	(United States) Brian Boyd	Suzuki	25					20	28			22	29
32	(United States) Cory Call	Kawasaki				18			19				25
33	(United States) Johnny Rock Page	Suzuki	23				24		29			25	23
34	(United States) David Loikits	Suzuki	24							26	25	26	23
35	(United States) Eli Edwards	Suzuki		22		22			27				22
36	(United States) Nickoles Moore	Yamaha			11								20
37	(United States) Sean Wray	Yamaha	28	24	27	Ret			26				19
38	(Canada) Francis Martin	Suzuki		13									18
39	(United States) Eric Haugo	Suzuki	22					23	Ret				17
40	(United States) Ivan Garza	Suzuki					23			23			16

== Formula Xtreme ==
=== Rider Standings ===
Pos	Rider	Bike	DAY (Florida)	BAR (Alabama)	FON (California)	INF (California)	PPK (Colorado)	RAM (Wisconsin)	LAG (California)	M-O (Ohio)	VIR (Virginia)	RAT (Georgia (U.S. state))	Pts
Pos	Rider	Bike	R1	R1	R1	R1	R1	R1	R1	R1	R1	R1	Pts
1	(Canada) Miguel Duhamel	Honda	1	2	2	2	2	1		2	1	1	314
2	(United States) Jake Zemke	Honda	3	1	1	1	1	2		1	2	17	295
3	(United States) Danny Eslick	Suzuki	4	13	4	6	5	5		9	Ret	4	198
4	(Australia) Ben Attard	Kawasaki	Ret	4		3	3	4		5	4	2	197
5	(Australia) Alex Gobert	Honda	11	12	7	7	8	6		30	14	9	175
6	(United States) Michael Barnes	Suzuki	7				6	3		4	5	3	160
7	(United States) Chris Peris	Yamaha	5	5	Ret	5	4	24		8	Ret	6	160
8	(United States) Nickoles Moore	Yamaha	18	8	5	11	7			13	7	21	158
9	(United States) Opie Caylor	Suzuki	Ret	9	6	9				10	6	7	139
10	(United States) Taylor Knapp	Yamaha	9	11	11	24	15	Ret		14	12	13	139
11	(United States) Robert Jensen	Yamaha	Ret	Ret	Ret	4	23	8		7	3	5	137
12	(United States) Nathan Hester	Yamaha	24	14	13	13	18	19		19	11	12	136
13	(United States) Ryan Andrews	Ducati	Ret	10	9	Ret	9	Ret		11	8	8	131
14	(Venezuela) Armando Ferrer	Yamaha	15	19	12	15	10			17	23	11	126
15	(Venezuela) Víctor Chirinos	Yamaha	Ret	23	17	19	13	9		26	13	19	109
16	(United States) Justin Filice	Honda	Ret	20	10	18	21	10		Ret	15		92
17	(United States) Mike Hale	Honda						7		12	9	10	86
18	(United States) Tim Knutson	Yamaha	17	18	14	Ret	16	11		Ret			79
19	(United States) Shea Fouchek	Suzuki				12	14	22		21	Ret	15	71
20	(Czech Republic) Vincent Haskovec	Suzuki	Ret	3	3	23							66
21	(United States) Kurtis Roberts	Honda	2							3			61
22	(United States) Heath Small	Yamaha	Ret		8		11			15			59
23	(United States) Ty Howard	Yamaha	8				Ret			6			48
24	(United States) Jeremiah Johnson	Suzuki	12	17									32
25	(United States) Ryan Elleby	Suzuki						Ret		16		14	32
26	(Canada) Kevin Lacombe	Suzuki	21			10							31
27	(United States) Myron Bell	Suzuki						21		23		18	31
28	(United States) Daniel Doty	Yamaha						12		22			28
29	(Canada) Pascal Picotte	Yamaha	Ret	6									25
30	(United States) Jason Perez	Yamaha	6										25
31	(United States) Derek Keyes	Suzuki	19							18		Ret	25
32	(Canada) Steve Crevier	Honda		7				Ret					24
33	(Canada) Clint McBain	Suzuki				8							23
34	(United States) William Meyers	Yamaha	23	16									23
35	(United States) Trey Yonce	Yamaha									10		21
36	(Republic of Ireland) Simon Turner	Yamaha	10										21
37	(United States) Jessica Zalusky	Kawasaki					26	25			21		21
38	(United States) Ricky Orlando	Kawasaki	Ret				12						19
39	(United States) Scott Jensen	Yamaha	12										19
40	(United States) David Ebben	Buell					20	23					19

== Supersport ==
=== Rider Standings ===
Pos	Rider	Bike	DAY (Florida)	BAR (Alabama)	FON (California)	INF (California)	PPK (Colorado)	RAM (Wisconsin)	LAG (California)	M-O (Ohio)	VIR (Virginia)	RAT (Georgia (U.S. state))	Pts
Pos	Rider	Bike	R1	R1	R1	R1	R1	R1	R1	R1	R1	R1	Pts
1	(United States) Tommy Hayden	Kawasaki	1	2	2	1	2	1	6	2	2	5	327
2	(United States) Roger Lee Hayden	Kawasaki	21	3	3	4	1	2	2	1	1	1	308
3	(United States) Jason DiSalvo	Yamaha	3	4	4	2	29	3	1	4	3	2	272
4	(United States) Ben Spies	Suzuki	4	10	6	5	7	5	4	5	26	7	231
5	(United States) Geoff May	Suzuki	8	11	8	8	10	6	5	11	7	8	228
6	(Australia) Aaron Gobert	Yamaha	5	5	5	17	4	4	3	9	6		222
7	(Australia) Damon Buckmaster	Yamaha	Ret	6	12	6	9	7	7	8	5	4	215
8	(United States) Ben Attard	Kawasaki	12	8	7	7	5	Ret	Ret	3	4	3	201
9	(United States) Robert Jensen	Yamaha	6	7	11	12	13	9	12	5	29	6	199
10	(Canada) Chris Peris	Yamaha	11	9	9	9	6	8	8	7	25	Ret	187
11	(United States) Blake Young	Suzuki	16	15	Ret	14	15	11	10	12	10	10	166
12	(United States) Jamie Hacking	Yamaha	2	1	1	3	3						165
13	(United States) Danny Eslick	Suzuki	10	13	13	10	8	Ret	14	10	Ret		139
14	(United States) Barrett Long	Yamaha	Ret	19	17	15	16	19	13	15	14	15	135
15	(United States) Nathan Hester	Yamaha	Ret	14	15	18	19	13	22	21	12	14	131
16	(United States) Nickoles Moore	Yamaha	15	Ret	10	11	11		9	27	8	Ret	126
17	(United States) Taylor Knapp	Yamaha	18	30	18			15	17	13	9	12	116
18	(Venezuela) Armando Ferrer	Yamaha	Ret	29		19	12		23	14	22	11	87
19	(United States) Justin Filice	Honda	26	25	20	23	21	Ret	29	19	17	24	75
20	(United States) Chris Siglin	Suzuki			14	13			11			13	73
21	(United States) Keith Marshall	Suzuki	25	17				18		Ret	13	20	62
22	(United States) Shea Fouchek	Suzuki				Ret	17	23	18	20	18	Ret	59
23	(United States) Jim Wood	Kawasaki			19		14		16				44
24	(United States) Derek Keyes	Triumph								16	15	19	43
25	(United States) Giovanni Rojas	Suzuki	20					16		23		23	42
26	(Venezuela) Víctor Chirinos	Yamaha	Ret	22	30	24	Ret	25	Ret	Ret	24	21	40
27	(United States) Chad Klock	Honda	30	18				24		18	27		38
28	(United States) Scott Jackson	Suzuki								22	16	18	37
29	(United States) Matthew Furtek	Kawasaki	Ret	Ret	16			14		Ret			32
30	(United States) Tristan Schoenewald	Honda			29	20	Ret	21				22	32
31	(United States) Chad Rolland	Yamaha			21	21	22		30				30
32	(United States) Brandon Parrish	Suzuki								17		17	28
33	(United States) Eli Edwards	Suzuki		20					15				27
34	(United States) Grant Riggs	Yamaha				16			19			Ret	27
35	(United States) Michael Barnes	Yamaha	7										24
36	(United States) Lee Acree	Suzuki										9	22
37	(Canada) Pascal Picotte	Yamaha	9										22
38	(United States) Shawn Conrad	Kawasaki						10					21
39	(United States) Dan Ortega	Yamaha	Ret	21				20					21
40	(United States) Chris Siebenhaar	Honda				28	20	27	28				21
