= Mike Hale =

American motorcycle racer

- Nationality: American
- Born: December 14, 1972 (age 53); Dallas, Texas, United States
Motorcycle racing career statistics
500cc World Championship
Active years	1999
Manufacturers	Modenas KR3
1999 championship position	31st (3 pts)
Starts / Wins / Podiums / Poles / F. laps / Points; 10 / 0 / 0 / 0 / 0 / 3
Superbike World Championship
Active years	1995–1997
Manufacturers	Honda, Ducati, Suzuki
Championships	0
1997 championship position	11th (87 pts)
Starts / Wins / Podiums / Poles / F. laps / Points; 52 / 0 / 1 / 0 / 0 / 261

Mike Hale (born December 14, 1972, in Dallas, Texas, United States) is an American motorcycle racer.

== Career statistics ==
=== Grand Prix motorcycle racing ===
==== By season ====
Season	Class	Motorcycle	Race	Win	Podium	Pole	FLap	Pts	Plcd
1999	500cc	Modenas KR3	10	0	0	0	0	3	31st
Total			**10**	**0**	**0**	**0**	**0**	**3**	

==== Races by year ====
(key) (Races in bold indicate pole position, races in italics indicate fastest lap)

Year	Class	Bike	1	2	3	4	5	6	7	8	9	10	11	12	13	14	15	16	Pos.	Pts
1999	500cc	Modenas KR3	MAL; 18	JPN; 19	SPA; 16	FRA; DNS	ITA	CAT	NED	GBR	GER	CZE; 15	IMO; 15	VAL; 15	AUS; Ret	RSA; Ret	BRA; Ret	ARG; 18	31st	3

=== Superbike World Championship ===
Year	Make	1		2		3		4		5		6		7		8		9		10		11		12		Pos.	Pts
Year	Make	R1	R2	R1	R2	R1	R2	R1	R2	R1	R2	R1	R2	R1	R2	R1	R2	R1	R2	R1	R2	R1	R2	R1	R2	Pos.	Pts
1995	Honda	GER	GER	SMR	SMR	GBR	GBR	ITA	ITA	SPA	SPA	AUT	AUT	USA; 4	USA; 3	EUR	EUR	JPN	JPN	NED	NED					15th	60
1995	Ducati																					INA; 6	INA; 7	AUS; 14	AUS; 6	15th	60
1996	Ducati	SMR; 13	SMR; 8	GBR; 14	GBR; 16	GER; Ret	GER; 8	ITA	ITA	CZE; 7	CZE; 5	USA; 6	USA; 10	EUR; 12	EUR; 11	INA; 10	INA; 9	JPN; 20	JPN; 22	NED; 11	NED; 12	SPA; 10	SPA; Ret	AUS; 9	AUS; 4	11th	114
1997	Suzuki	AUS; Ret	AUS; Ret	SMR; Ret	SMR; 12	GBR; 15	GBR; Ret	GER; 9	GER; Ret	ITA; 10	ITA; 9	USA; 14	USA; Ret	EUR; 9	EUR; 11	AUT; 11	AUT; 7	NED; 11	NED; Ret	SPA; 8	SPA; 9	JPN; 21	JPN; 10	INA; 8	INA; Ret	11th	87

=== AMA Formula Xtreme Championship ===
==== By year ====
Year	Class	Bike	1	2	3	4	5	6	7	8	9	10	11	Pos	Pts
2005	Formula Xtreme	Suzuki	DAY	BAR	FON	INF	PPK	RAM; 7	LAG	M-O; 12	VIR; 9	RAT; 10		17th	86
2006	Formula Xtreme	Buell	DAY	BAR; 28	FON	INF	RAM	MIL	LAG; Ret	OHI; 17	VIR; 18	RAT	OHI	36th	30
