= 2004 AMA Superbike Championship =

Seasons
- ← 2003 2005 →

The 2004 AMA Superbike Championship is the 29th season of the AMA Superbike Championship.

== Season Calendar ==
No	Date	Round/Circuit	Superstock Race Winner	FX Race Winner	Supersport Race Winner
1	March 3–6	(Florida) Daytona	(Australia) Aaron Gobert	(Canada) Miguel Duhamel	(United States) Jason DiSalvo
2	April 2–4	(California) Fontana	(United States) Ben Spies	(Canada) Miguel Duhamel	(United States) Tommy Hayden
3	April 30-May 2	(California) Infineon	(United States) Jamie Hacking	(Canada) Miguel Duhamel	(United States) Ben Spies
4	May 14–16	(Alabama) Barber	(United States) Jamie Hacking	(United States) Jake Zemke	(United States) Roger Lee Hayden
5	May 21–23	(Colorado) Pikes Peak	(United States) Jamie Hacking	(United States) Jake Zemke	(United States) Tommy Hayden
6	June 4–6	(Wisconsin) Road America	(United States) Tommy Hayden	(Canada) Miguel Duhamel	(United States) Tommy Hayden
7	June 25–27	(Minnesota) Brainerd	(United States) Jamie Hacking	(Canada) Miguel Duhamel	(United States) Tommy Hayden
8	July 9–11	(California) Laguna Seca	(United States) Tommy Hayden	(United States) Ben Bostrom	(United States) Roger Lee Hayden
9	July 23–25	Mid-Ohio	(United States) Jason DiSalvo	(Canada) Miguel Duhamel	(United States) Roger Lee Hayden
10	September 3–5	(Georgia (U.S. state)) Road Atlanta	(United States) Ben Spies	(Canada) Miguel Duhamel	(United States) Roger Lee Hayden
11	October 9–10	(Virginia) VIR	(United States) Jason DiSalvo	(Canada) Miguel Duhamel	(United States) Jason DiSalvo

== Superbike Season Calendar ==
No		Round/Circuit	Date	Pole position	Fastest lap	Winner
1	R1	(Florida) Daytona	March 3–6	(United States) Eric Bostrom	(United States) Eric Bostrom	(Australia) Mat Mladin
2	R1	(California) Fontana	April 2–4	(Australia) Mat Mladin	(Australia) Mat Mladin	(Australia) Mat Mladin
2	R2	(California) Fontana	April 2–4	(Australia) Mat Mladin	(Australia) Mat Mladin	(Australia) Mat Mladin
3	R1	(California) Infineon	April 30-May 2	(Australia) Mat Mladin	(Australia) Mat Mladin	(Australia) Mat Mladin
3	R2	(California) Infineon	April 30-May 2	(Australia) Mat Mladin	(Canada) Miguel Duhamel	(Canada) Miguel Duhamel
4	R1	(Alabama) Barber	May 14–16	(Australia) Mat Mladin	(Australia) Mat Mladin	(Australia) Mat Mladin
4	R2	(Alabama) Barber	May 14–16	(Australia) Mat Mladin	(Canada) Miguel Duhamel	(Canada) Miguel Duhamel
5	R1	(Colorado) Pikes Peak	May 21–23	(United States) Jake Zemke	(United States) Eric Bostrom	(United States) Eric Bostrom
6	R1	(Wisconsin) Road America	June 4–6	(Canada) Miguel Duhamel	(Canada) Miguel Duhamel	(Canada) Miguel Duhamel
6	R2	(Wisconsin) Road America	June 4–6	(Canada) Miguel Duhamel	(Canada) Miguel Duhamel	(Canada) Miguel Duhamel
7	R1	(Minnesota) Brainerd	June 25–27	(United States) Jake Zemke	(United States) Jake Zemke	(United States) Jake Zemke
8	R1	(California) Laguna Seca	July 9–11	(United States) Ben Bostrom	(United States) Ben Bostrom	(United States) Ben Bostrom
9	R1	Mid-Ohio	July 23–25	(United States) Jake Zemke	(United States) Ben Bostrom	(Australia) Mat Mladin
9	R2	Mid-Ohio	July 23–25	(United States) Jake Zemke	(United States) Jake Zemke	(United States) Jake Zemke
10	R1	(Georgia (U.S. state)) Road Atlanta	September 3–5	(Australia) Mat Mladin	(Canada) Miguel Duhamel	(Australia) Mat Mladin
10	R2	(Georgia (U.S. state)) Road Atlanta	September 3–5	(Australia) Mat Mladin	(Australia) Mat Mladin	(Australia) Mat Mladin
9	R1	(Virginia) VIR	October 9–10	(Canada) Miguel Duhamel	(United States) Ben Bostrom	(Canada) Miguel Duhamel
9	R2	(Virginia) VIR	October 9–10	(Canada) Miguel Duhamel	(Australia) Mat Mladin	(Canada) Miguel Duhamel

== AMA Superbike ==
=== Rider Standings ===
Pos	Rider	Bike	DAY (Florida)	FON (California)		INF (California)		BAR (Alabama)		PPK (Colorado)	RAM (Wisconsin)		BRD (Minnesota)	LAG (California)	M-O (Ohio)		RAT (Georgia (U.S. state))		VIR (Virginia)		Pts
Pos	Rider	Bike	R1	R1	R2	R1	R2	R1	R2	R1	R1	R2	R1	R1	R1	R2	R1	R2	R1	R2	Pts
1	(Australia) Mat Mladin	Suzuki	1	1	1	1	4	1	3	6	2	3	3	2	1	3	1	1	6	4	584
2	(Canada) Miguel Duhamel	Honda	3	3	4	2	1	3	1	4	1	1	2	3	2	Ret	2	2	1	1	551
3	(United States) Jake Zemke	Honda	2	4	3	3	2	2	2	2	3	2	1	7	4	1	4	4	Ret	DNS	490
4	(United States) Ben Bostrom	Honda	Ret	Ret	5	4	5	Ret	5	5	4	5	5	1	4	2	3	3	3	3	422
5	(United States) Geoff May	Suzuki	17	5	7	9	9	7	9	10	8	9	10	10	12	13	7	10	9	9	388
6	(United States) Aaron Yates	Suzuki	23	DNS	DNS	10	3	Ret	4	3	7	4	7	4	3	4	5	Ret	2	2	363
7	(United States) Eric Bostrom	Ducati	25	2	2	5	Ret	4	7	1	5	6	4	5	7	7	Ret	DNS	DNS	DNS	336
8	(United States) Josh Hayes	Kawasaki	Ret	21	29	6	7	5	6	7	Ret	Ret	6	6	6	5	27	5	7	6	316
9	(United States) Eric Wood	Suzuki	10	16	10	Ret	14	9	25	14	10	10	11	13	13	9	8	9	20	12	314
10	(United States) John Haner	Suzuki	15	9	16	15	16	6	8	15	15	12	14	12	9	10	6	6			312
11	(United States) Shawn Higbee	Suzuki		Ret	30	Ret	10	10	11	8	9	13	19	14	11	12	9	11	11	24	263
12	(United States) Larry Pegram	Yamaha	27	7	8	8	8	11	Ret	27	Ret	8	12	9	10	8	28	7	DNS	DNS	256
13	(United States) Cory West	Suzuki	13	14	14	19	18	14	16	18	18	17	13	Ret	15	15	20	13	15	Ret	234
14	(United States) Lee Acree	Suzuki	5	12	9	13	11	17	14	11	Ret	Ret		17	16	11	Ret	12			224
15	(United States) Jeremy Toye	Yamaha		13	11	Ret	Ret	8	10		11	11	25	11			19	20	12	10	211
16	(United States) Opie Caylor	Suzuki	8	10	Ret	14	Ret	23	15	19	12	14		25	17	20	10	15			201
17	(United States) JJ Roetlin	Suzuki	16	22	22	28	26	16	17	12	Ret	16	15	18	18	17	16	29	25	20	194
18	(United States) Dean Mizdal	Suzuki	24	20	19	27	25	19	Ret	23	17	19	17	Ret	22	23	24	24	24	21	148
19	(United States) Scott Jensen	Suzuki	9	15	12	Ret	Ret	26	Ret		26	23	22	24	21	19			18	18	139
20	(United States) Andrew Deatherage	Suzuki									13	15	16		19	14	17	18	21	19	127
21	(Australia) Martin Craggill	Suzuki		8	Ret									15	14	Ret	26	8	14	7	125
22	(Canada) Steve Crevier	Suzuki		6	6	Ret	6				6	7									124
23	(United States) David Bell	Suzuki	18	24	18	25	17	15	19	22	20	Ret	23	Ret					27	22	122
24	(United States) Byron Barbour	Suzuki	21					12	13						25	22	14	17	23	13	119
25	(United States) Jake Holden	Suzuki									Ret	DNS	9	8	8	6	Ret	Ret	8	Ret	116
26	(United States) Jack Pfeifer	Suzuki	4	26	26	21	19	20	23	25	27	22	27	Ret	26	27					110
27	(United States) Michael Smith	Suzuki						Ret	12								12	13	10	8	100
28	(United States) Jason Curtis	Suzuki		19	17	Ret	22	22	24	Ret	28	27	18	Ret	20	21	Ret	26			97
29	(Canada) Clint McBain	Suzuki		11	13	12	12														76
30	(United States) Robert Christman	Suzuki		18	Ret	16	15			20	24	25									68
31	(United States) Marco Martinez	Suzuki	11					24	20		Ret	Ret		22					26	17	66
32	(Canada) Pascal Picotte	Yamaha	7								14	Ret	8								64
33	(United States) Mike Sullivan	Yamaha	Ret					18	18	17	21	Ret		19							62
34	(United States) David Weber	Suzuki									Ret	18			Ret	16	18	Ret	Ret	11	61
35	(United States) Roger Bell	Suzuki	19								16	Ret			29	Ret	22	22	17	Ret	61
36	(United States) Mark Ledesma	Honda		23	21			25	21	21				20			29	28			60
37	(United States) Jesse Janisch	Suzuki													Ret	18	15	14	22	27	59
38	(United States) Ricky Orlando	Suzuki	6							9				23							55
39	(France) Régis Laconi	Ducati																	5	5	52
40	(United States) Charles Sorenson	Yamaha													Ret	28	13	19	30	14	51

== AMA Superstock ==
=== Rider Standings ===
Pos	Rider	Bike	DAY (Florida)	FON (California)	INF (California)	BAR (Alabama)	PPK (Colorado)	RAM (Wisconsin)	BRD (Minnesota)	LAG (California)	M-O (Ohio)	RAT (Georgia (U.S. state))	VIR (Virginia)	Pts
Pos	Rider	Bike	R1	R1	R1	R1	R1	R1	R1	R1	R1	R1	R1	Pts
1	(Australia) Aaron Gobert	Yamaha	1	5	3	4	2	3	7	3	4	2	4	320
2	(United States) Jamie Hacking	Yamaha	2	3	1	1	1	24	1	6	11	6	3	317
3	(United States) Tommy Hayden	Kawasaki	3	7	4	2	6	1	4	1	10	3	6	313
4	(United States) Jason DiSalvo	Yamaha	6	4	5	7	4	4	3	5	1	5	1	312
5	(United States) Ben Spies	Suzuki	7	1	6	22	7	5	6	7	2	1	2	297
6	(United States) Roger Lee Hayden	Kawasaki	5	6	11	3	3	6	5	2	3	4	Ret	268
7	(United States) Steve Rapp	Suzuki	9	8	7	6	8	9	10	12	9	10	9	244
8	(United States) Josh Hayes	Kawasaki	7	30	8	5	Ret	2	2	4	5	11	8	235
9	(United States) Jake Holden	Suzuki	15	18	10	11	10	7	8	9	8	8	5	232
10	(Australia) Alex Gobert	Honda	22	14	12	8	9	15	9	10	14	12	12	204
11	(United States) Jason Pridmore	Suzuki	14	9		12	5	8	21	8	6	20	10	197}
12	(Czech Republic) Vincent Haskovec	Suzuki	23	13	9	Ret	14	13	11	11	7	9	18	182
13	(United States) John Haner	Suzuki	10	11	13	22	12	12	13	Ret	12	7		167
14	(United States) Eric Wood	Suzuki	12	19	17	10	13	11	15	15	13	Ret	Ret	154
15	(Australia) Damon Buckmaster	Yamaha	4	2	2	9						Ret	7	139
16	(United States) JJ Roetlin	Suzuki	25	22	Ret	14	11	14	16	14	15	14	Ret	134
17	(United States) Geoff May	Suzuki	17	10	18	13	9	Ret	12	Ret	Ret			97
18	(United States) Jesse Janisch	Suzuki						16	18	16	16	13	17	90
19	(United States) Jason Curtis	Suzuki	24	Ret	19	17	Ret	Ret	17	18	17	16		89
20	(United States) Scott Greenwood	Suzuki						10	14	13	Ret	Ret	11	76
21	(United States) James Kerker	Honda				24		19	19	Ret	20	17	13	74
22	(United States) Shawn Higbee	Suzuki	11	12	14									56
23	(United States) Montez Stewart	Yamaha	26	26	21	Ret	Ret		Ret	25	Ret	18	14	56
24	(United States) Lee Acree	Suzuki	13	15	15									50
25	(United States) Brian Hall	Suzuki				19		17			18			39
26	(United States) Corey Eaton	Suzuki	21	20	16					Ret				36
27	(United States) Opie Caylor	Suzuki	20	17	Ret									25
28	(United States) Marco Martinez	Suzuki	27			16				27				23
29	(United States) Corey Sarros	Suzuki					18	21						23
30	(United States) Gary Combs	Suzuki		Ret	20					20				22
31	(United States) Jessica Zalusky	Suzuki						23	20					19
32	(United States) David Sanders	Suzuki		21						23				18
33	(United States) Christopher Ancien	Suzuki		Ret			15			Ret				16
34	(United States) Roland Williams	Suzuki											15	16
35	(United States) Jeff Tigert	Honda										15		16
36	(United States) David Weber	Suzuki				15								16
37	(United States) Christian Pistoni	Suzuki				Ret	16							15
38	(United States) Sean Wray	Yamaha											16	15
39	(Australia) Anthony Gobert	Honda		16										15
40	(United States) Jordan Szoke	Honda	16											15

== AMA Formula Xtreme ==
=== Rider Standings ===
Pos	Rider	Bike	DAY (Florida)	FON (California)	INF (California)	BAR (Alabama)	PPK (Colorado)	RAM (Wisconsin)	BRD (Minnesota)	LAG (California)	M-O (Ohio)	RAT (Georgia (U.S. state))	VIR (Virginia)	Pts
Pos	Rider	Bike	R1	R1	R1	R1	R1	R1	R1	R1	R1	R1	R1	Pts
1	(Canada) Miguel Duhamel	Honda	1	1	1	2	2	1	1	2	1	1	1	395
2	(United States) Jake Zemke	Honda	3	2	2	1	1	2	2	3	21	2	30	308
3	(Czech Republic) Vincent Haskovec	Suzuki	6	5	29	4	4	6	3	5	3	17	2	263
4	(Australia) Alex Gobert	Honda	4	4	3	3	6	3	4	4	7	21	Ret	254
5	(United States) Larry Pegram	Yamaha		6	7	6	12	8	8	8	14	5	Ret	215
6	(United States) Jason Pridmore	Suzuki	Ret	3	6	5	5	Ret	Ret	7	2	4	21	199
7	(United States) Heath Small	Yamaha		11	19	13	13	14	9	13	5	9	7	197
8	(United States) Nathan Hester	Yamaha	13	13	16	14	17	15	11	20	15	11	18	178
9	(United States) Doug Chandler	Ducati					3	4	16	6	19	3	3	166
10	(United States) Perry Melneciuc	Yamaha	11	12	20	15	15	16	12	Ret	12	14		152
11	(United States) Nickoles Moore	Honda				11	10		10	9		12	6	128
12	(United States) Danny Eslick	Suzuki		10	9	12	8	12		12				123
13	(United States) Michael Barnes	Buell			8	10	9	11	6	Ret	20	Ret	Ret	122
14	(United States) Jake Holden	Suzuki	7	7	5	8	7							121
15	(United States) Mike Ciccotto	Buell			11	9	Ret	7	Ret	10		Ret	4	114
16	(United States) Blake Young	Suzuki						6	7	14	Ret	8	Ret	85
17	(Canada) Pascal Picotte	Yamaha	5					9	5					74
18	(United States) Opie Caylor	Suzuki									9	7	5	72
19	(United States) Ben Bostrom	Honda	2							1				70
20	(United States) Darin Edwards	Suzuki				21				17		13	8	65
21	(United States) Corey Eaton	Suzuki	9	9	10									65
22	(United States) Tim Knutson	Yamaha			25		19			24		19	14	54
23	(Canada) Steve Crevier	Suzuki		Ret	4			5						53
24	(United States) Michael Smith	Yamaha				7						6		49
25	(United States) Thomas Montano	Honda			14					15		16		48
26	(United States) Ty Howard	Yamaha								11	6			45
27	(United States) Brien Whitlock	Suzuki		21	13					19				40
28	(United States) Carlo Gagliardo	Yamaha				16						Ret	10	36
29	(United States) Derek Keyes	Suzuki				19					Ret		9	34
30	(United States) Mickey Lane	Yamaha			Ret		11			18				33
31	(United States) Randy Rega	Yamaha									17		13	32
32	(United States) Garth Dillon	Yamaha		14	17									31
33	(United States) Chad Rolland	Yamaha			21		20			21				31
34	(United States) Eric Haugo	Suzuki		18					14					30
35	(United States) Joseph Arico	Yamaha				17						15	Ret	30
36	(United States) Adam Vella	Suzuki	15										19	28
37	(United States) Jeremiah Johnson	Suzuki										20	15	27
38	(United States) Jay Tanner	Yamaha		15	22									25
39	(United States) Marc Palazzo	Yamaha		8						Ret				23
40	(United States) Giovanni Rojas	Yamaha									8			23

== AMA Supersport ==
=== Rider Standings ===
Pos	Rider	Bike	DAY (Florida)	FON (California)	INF (California)	BAR (Alabama)	PPK (Colorado)	RAM (Wisconsin)	BRD (Minnesota)	LAG (California)	M-O (Ohio)	RAT (Georgia (U.S. state))	VIR (Virginia)	Pts
Pos	Rider	Bike	R1	R1	R1	R1	R1	R1	R1	R1	R1	R1	R1	Pts
1	(United States) Tommy Hayden	Kawasaki	3	1	3	2	1	1	1	3	4	2	6	352
2	(United States) Roger Lee Hayden	Kawasaki	2	3	6	1	4	5	2	1	1	1	4	343
3	(United States) Aaron Gobert	Yamaha	4	5	5	3	2	3	5	30	3	4	3	284
4	(United States) Ben Spies	Suzuki	Ret	2	1	7	7	6	6	4	2	5	7	279
5	(United States) Jason DiSalvo	Yamaha	1	6	4	Ret	3	4	3	2	Ret	3	1	274
6	(United States) Steve Rapp	Suzuki	9	7	12	5	6	15	7	6	6	8	5	255
7	(United States) Michael Barnes	Yamaha	6	9	11	8	11	8	9	8	5	9	9	248
8	(United States) Jamie Hacking	Yamaha	5	4	2	4	5	2	4				2	233
9	(United States) Ben Attard	Suzuki		8	8	10	9	7	Ret	5	27	7	8	190
10	(Canada) Chris Peris	Suzuki	Ret	13	18	30	14	12	11	9	8	13	12	170
11	(United States) Tony Meiring	Kawasaki	10	10	10	9	10	Ret	Ret	7	Ret	11	13	168
12	(United States) Danny Eslick	Suzuki	16	17	Ret	18	12	13	13	13	11	10	27	160
13	(United States) Lee Acree	Suzuki	12	11	13	11	Ret	16			9	12	10	154
14	(United States) Darren Luck	Suzuki	19	15	17	13	15	18	14	15	Ret	16	15	153
15	(United States) Aaron Yates	Suzuki	7		7	6	8	9	8					141
16	(United States) Jason Perez	Yamaha	11	16	16	12	Ret	Ret	10	10	Ret	15		127
17	(United States) Giovanni Rojas	Yamaha	20	21	28	26	18	20	18	20	16	20	14	120
18	(United States) Blake Young	Suzuki	21			14		11	15	14	Ret	14	11	117
19	(United States) Nickoles Moore	Honda		12		Ret	13	14	12	12		23	16	115
20	(United States) Nathan Hester	Yamaha	18	22	25	16	21	23	21	Ret	14	Ret	20	99
21	(Australia) Damon Buckmaster	Yamaha	8	30	9	Ret				11		6	Ret	91
22	(United States) John Bowman	Yamaha	15	24	23	15	19	22	23					76
23	(United States) Jason Farrell	Kawasaki						10	16		12	22		64
24	(United States) Pedro Valiente	Yamaha	14	Ret	29	17	16		22					57
25	(United States) Chris Ulrich	Suzuki								17	10	17	Ret	49
26	(United States) William Meyers	Yamaha	Ret			19					13	18	26	48
27	(United States) Dan Doty	Yamaha				25	20	29	26	24	20	26		47
28	(United States) Chad Klock	Honda				21		26	25		17		23	43
29	(United States) Heath Small	Yamaha		DNS	Ret	Ret	Ret	19	17	Ret	15			42
30	(United States) Brad Hendry	Yamaha	26	20	26	20	22							41
