= Triumph Rocket =

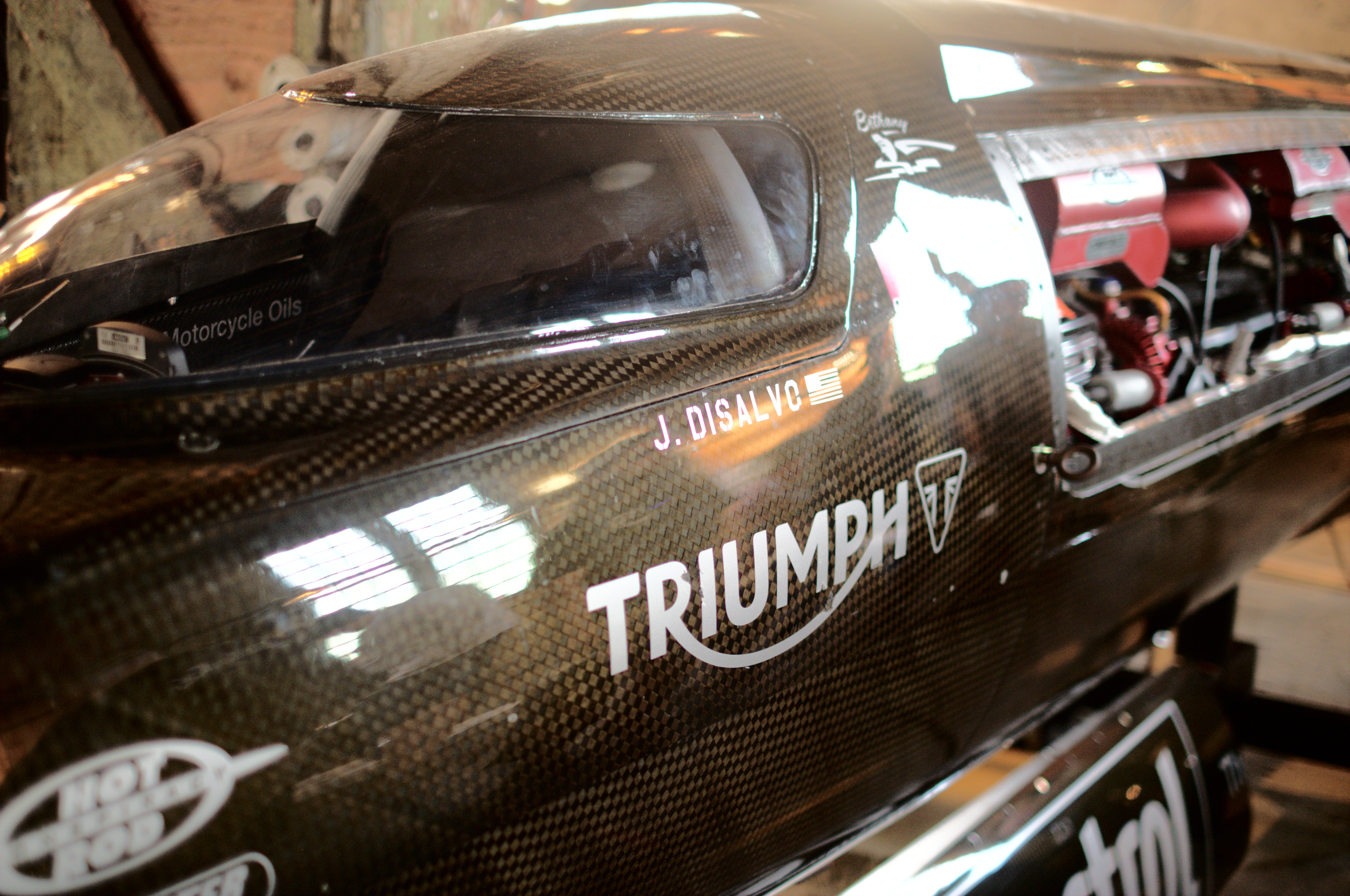
- Triumph Castrol Rocket cockpit
- Class: Streamliner
- Engine: Twin turbocharged 1,485 cc (90.6 cu in) inline-3 engines (2,970 cc total); Methanol fueled
- Bore / stroke: 4 in × 2.4 in (102 mm × 61 mm)
- Top speed: Greater than 400 mph (640 km/h) (projected)
- Power: 1,100 hp (820 kW) @ 9,000 RPM
- Torque: 500 lb⋅ft (680 N⋅m) (claimed)
- Dimensions: L: 306 in (7.8 m); W: 24 in (0.61 m); H: 36 in (0.91 m)

The Triumph Infor Rocket Streamliner (previously known as the Hot Rod Conspiracy/Carpenter Racing Castrol Rocket or Triumph Castrol Rocket) is a streamliner motorcycle built to challenge the motorcycle land speed record. It is powered by twin destroked and turbocharged 1,485 cc (90.6 cu in) inline-3 engines sourced from the Triumph Rocket III, and modified by Carpenter Racing, generating a claimed output greater than 1,000 horsepower (750 kW). The streamliner shell is a monocoque constructed from carbon fiber/kevlar.

The motorcycle was designed and built by Matt Markstaller, an engineer who designed and built a wind tunnel for tractor-trailers in Portland, Oregon. It was ridden by Jason DiSalvo, followed by Guy Martin.

After two abandoned attempts due to poor conditions on the salt, the team announced that it would return to Bonneville Speedway in August 2016 to break the motorcycle world land speed record.

The Triumph Infor Rocket Streamliner is currently on display at Haynes Motor Museum.
