= Patricia Fernandez (motorcyclist) =

American motorcycle racer

- Nationality: American
- Current team: MotoAmerica: ADR Motorsports, UGP: Magic Bullet Racing

Patricia Fernandez is an American motorcycle racer.

== Racing ==
Fernandez races in the MotoAmerica Superstock 600 class on purpose-built short circuits, although she has also raced in the Daytona 200 and in one-off short circuit races overseas in both Australia, Ireland, and the US. In 2014, she made her debut at the Ulster Grand Prix, a race in Northern Ireland held on a circuit made from public roads closed for the purpose, and has raced there every year since. In 2016, she was recognized by the organizers of the UGP as 'The fastest ever female road racer' with a special gold medal, after her 118.264 mph average lap of the Dundrod Circuit on a 600 during the second Supersport race of the 2016 UGP. Technically, Jenny Tinmouth has lapped the Mountain Course at the Isle of Man TT at 119.998 mph on a 1000cc Superbike during the Senior TT in 2010, but the UGP organizers have long styled their event as 'The World's Fastest Road Race.'
