= Danny Eslick =

American motorcycle racer

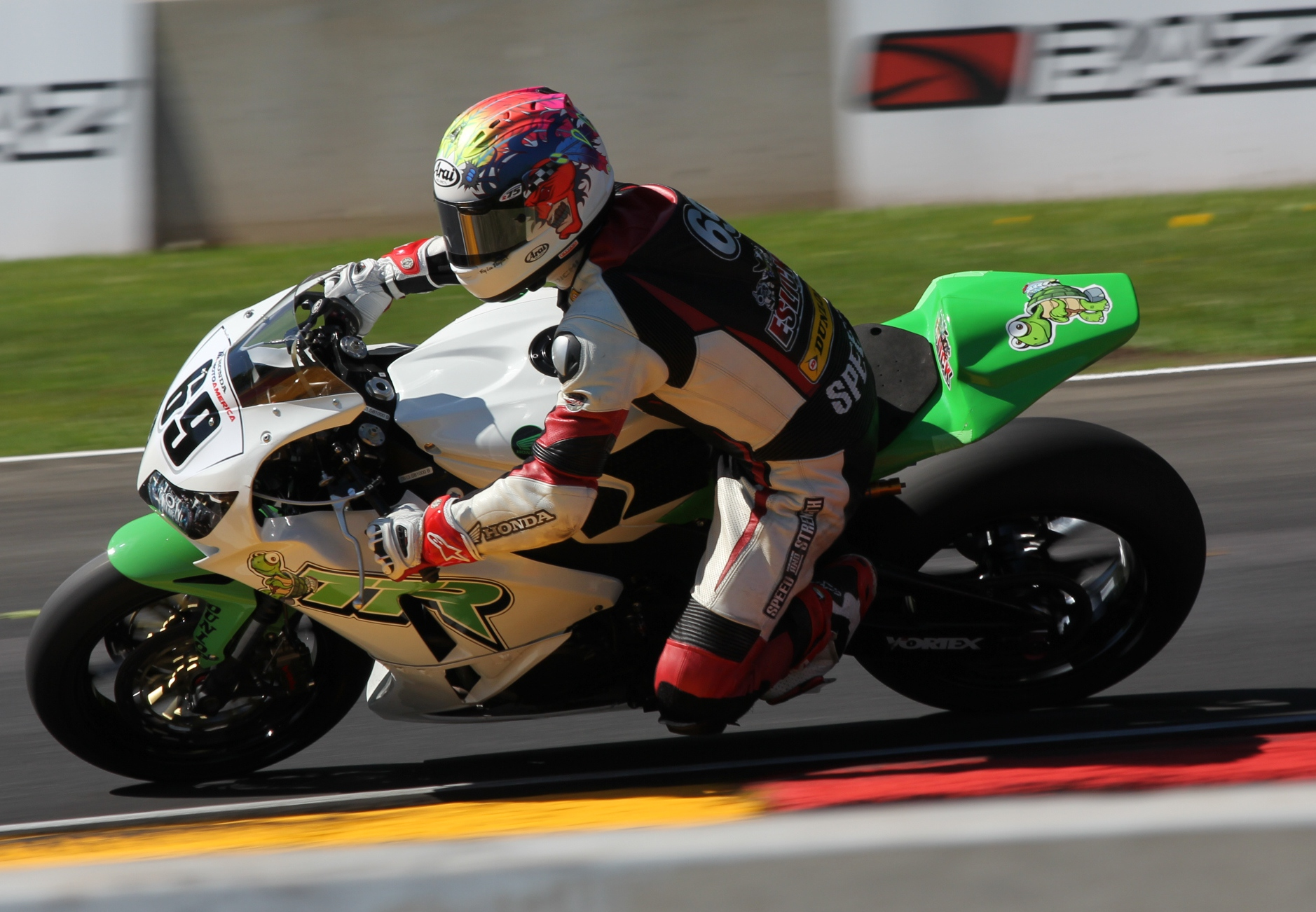
- Eslick in 2015
- Born: 29 May 1986 (age 40); Tulsa, Oklahoma, United States
- Current team: Team no fun
- Bike number: 69
- Website: www.tobcracing.com
Motorcycle racing career statistics
Moto2 World Championship
Active years	2016
Manufacturers	Suter
Championships	0
2016 championship position	NC (0 pts)
Starts / Wins / Podiums / Poles / F. laps / Points; 1 / 0 / 0 / 0 / 0 / 0
Superbike World Championship
Active years	2013
Manufacturers	Suzuki
Championships	0
2013 championship position	39th (2 pts)
Starts / Wins / Podiums / Poles / F. laps / Points; 1 / 0 / 0 / 0 / 0 / 2

Danny Eslick (born 29 May 1986) is an American professional motorcycle racer. He currently competes in the MotoAmerica Superstock 1000 Championship aboard a BMW S1000RR.

== Career ==
Born in Tulsa, Oklahoma, Eslick has competed for most of his career in the United States, where he won the AMA Pro Daytona Sportbike Championship in 2009 (on a Buell 1125R) and 2011 (on a Suzuki GSX-R600), the Harley-Davidson XR1200 Series in 2010 and the Daytona 200 race in 2014, 2015, 2017, and 2018.

Eslick made his debut at international level when he competed in the 2013 Superbike World Championship round held in Laguna Seca as a wild card with Michael Jordan Motorsports.

Eslick made his Grand Prix debut in the Moto2 class when he replaced the injured Efrén Vázquez in the 2016 French motorcycle Grand Prix, finishing the race in 25th place.

== Career statistics ==
=== AMA Formula Xtreme Championship ===
==== By year ====
Year	Class	Bike	1	2	3	4	5	6	7	8	9	10	11	Pos	Pts
2004	Formula Xtreme	Suzuki	DAY	FON; 10	INF; 9	BAR; 12	PPK; 8	RAM; 12	BRD	LAG; 12	M-O	RAT	VIR	12th	123
2005	Formula Xtreme	Suzuki	DAY; 4	BAR; 13	FON; 4	INF; 6	PPK; 5	RAM; 5	LAG	M-O; 9	VIR; Ret	RAT; 4		3rd	198
2006	Formula Xtreme	Suzuki	DAY; Ret	BAR; 5	FON; 5	INF; 3	RAM; Ret	MIL; 5	LAG; Ret	OHI; 6	VIR; Ret	RAT; Ret	OHI; 7	26th	34

=== AMA Supersport Championship ===
==== By year ====
Year	Class	Bike	1	2	3	4	5	6	7	8	9	10	11	12	13	14	15	16	17	Pos	Pts
2004	Supersport	Suzuki	DAY; 16	FON; 17	INF; Ret	BAR; 18	PPK; 12	RAM; 13	BRD; 13	LAG; 13	M-O; 11	RAT; 10	VIR; 27							12th	160
2005	Supersport	Suzuki	DAY; 10	BAR; 13	FON; 13	INF; 10	PPK; 8	RAM; Ret	LAG; 14	M-O; 10	VIR; Ret	RAT								13th	139
2006	Supersport	Suzuki	DAY; 5	BAR; 6	FON; 3	INF; C	RAM; 8	MIL; 4	LAG; 6	OHI; 5	VIR; 8	RAT; 4	OHI; Ret							6th	231
2007	Supersport	Suzuki	DAY; Ret	BAR; 10	FON; 8	INF; 11	RAM; 12	MIL; 15	LAG; 12	OHI	VIR; 16	RAT; 27	LAG; Ret							14th	137
2019	Supersport	Suzuki	ATL	ATL	VIR	VIR	RAM; 9	RAM; 10	UMC	UMC	MON	SON	SON	PIT; 11	PIT; 9	NJR	NJR	ALA	ALA	18th	25

=== AMA Superstock Championship ===
Year	Class	Bike	1	2	3	4	5	6	7	8	9	10	11	Pos	Pts
2007	Superstock	Suzuki	DAY; 5	BAR; 5	FON; 6	INF; 4	RAM; 11	MIL; 5	LAG	OHI	VIR; 6	RAT; 21	LAG; 8	7th	198

=== MotoAmerica Superstock 1000 Championship ===
==== Races by year ====
Year	Class	Team	1		2		3	4		5	6	7	8	9	Pos	Pts
Year	Class	Team	R1	R2	R1	R2	R2	R1	R2	R1	R1	R1	R1	R1	Pos	Pts
2021	Superstock 1000	Suzuki	ATL	ATL	VIR	VIR	RAM	RID	RID	MON	BRA	PIT	NJR	ALA; 6	20th	10

=== Superbike World Championship ===
==== Races by year ====
(key) (Races in bold indicate pole position) (Races in italics indicate fastest lap)

Year	Bike	1		2		3		4		5		6		7		8		9		10		11		12		13		14		Pos	Pts
Year	Bike	R1	R2	R1	R2	R1	R2	R1	R2	R1	R2	R1	R2	R1	R2	R1	R2	R1	R2	R1	R2	R1	R2	R1	R2	R1	R2	R1	R2	Pos	Pts
2013	Suzuki	AUS	AUS	SPA	SPA	NED	NED	ITA	ITA	GBR	GBR	POR	POR	ITA	ITA	RUS	RUS	GBR	GBR	GER	GER	TUR	TUR	USA; DNS	USA; 14	FRA	FRA	SPA	SPA	39th	2

=== Grand Prix motorcycle racing ===
==== By season ====
Season	Class	Motorcycle	Team	Race	Win	Podium	Pole	FLap	Pts	Plcd
2016	Moto2	Suter	JPMoto Malaysia	1	0	0	0	0	0	NC
Total				**1**	**0**	**0**	**0**	**0**	**0**	

==== Races by year ====
(key) (Races in bold indicate pole position) (Races in italics indicate fastest lap)

Year	Class	Bike	1	2	3	4	5	6	7	8	9	10	11	12	13	14	15	16	17	18	Pos	Pts
2016	Moto2	Suter	QAT	ARG	AME	SPA	FRA; 25	ITA	CAT	NED	GER	AUT	CZE	GBR	RSM	ARA	JPN	AUS	MAL	VAL	NC	0

=== MotoAmerica SuperBike Championship ===
Year	Class	Team	1		2		3		4		5		6		7		8			9			Pos	Pts
Year	Class	Team	R1	R2	R1	R2	R1	R2	R1	R2	R1	R2	R1	R2	R1	R2	R1	R2	R3	R1	R2	R3	Pos	Pts
2021	SuperBike	Suzuki	ATL	ATL	VIR	VIR	RAM	RAM	TRD	TRD	LGS	LGS	BRA	BRA	PIT	PIT	NJR	NJR	NJR	ALA; 6	ALA; 9	ALA; 13	24th	20
