= Mat Mladin =

Australian motorcycle racer

Mathew Mladin
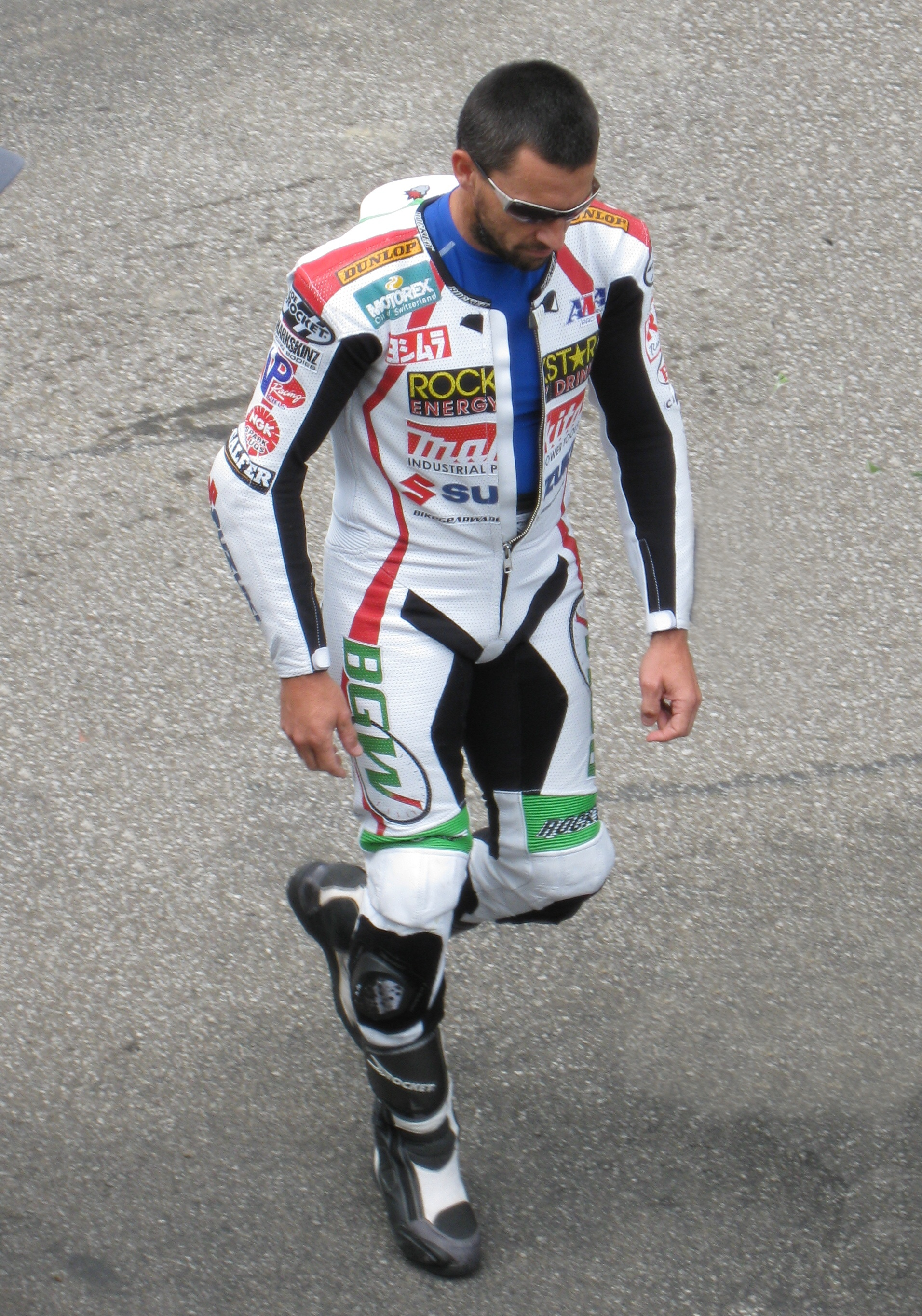
- Born: 10 March 1972 (age 54); Oakdale, New South Wales, Australia
- Nationality: Australian
- Nickname: Mat

Championship titles
- AMA Superbike Champion 1999, 2000, 2001, 2003, 2004, 2005, 2009

Awards
- AMA Motorcycle Hall of Fame inductee (2024)
Statistics
AMA Superbike Championship
Active years	1996-2009
Championships	7 (1999, 2000, 2001, 2003, 2004, 2005, 2009)
Wins	83 (AMA Superbike record)
Poles	50 (AMA Superbike record)
Last season (2009)	1st (10 wins/ 453 pts)
500cc Grand Prix Motorcycle Championship
Active years	1993
Championships	0
Team(s)	Cagiva Team Agostini
Last season (1993)	13th (45 pts)
Starts / Wins / Podiums / Poles / F. laps / Points; 11 / 0 / 0 / 0 / 0 / 45

Mathew Josef Mladin (born 10 March 1972, in Camden, New South Wales) is an Australian retired professional motorcycle racer who last raced in 2009, riding a Yoshimura Suzuki in the AMA Superbike series. He won the title seven times and holds series records for wins (83), poles (50) and poles in a season (10).

== Career ==
=== Early years (1992–1995) ===
Born in Camden, a suburb of Sydney, Mladin began his professional racing career in 1992. He won the Australian Superbike Championship that year, and made his debut in the 500cc World Championship class the following year, disappointed at finishing in position thirteen and at his treatment by the Cagiva factory team.

A plane crash in 1995 nearly cost Mladin his foot, but he returned in time to finish second in the Australian Superbike championship.

=== AMA (1996–2009) ===
Mladin joined the AMA Superbike series in 1996, riding for Yoshimura Suzuki, and finished fourth overall. He switched to Fast By Ferracci Ducati the following year and finished third in the championship before returning to Suzuki for 1998 where he again finished third. He finally broke through to win the 1999 championship. Remaining with Suzuki as of 2007, he went on to take the title in 2000, 2001, 2003, 2004, and 2005, with a second-place finish behind Ben Spies in 2006 (despite winning the final 5 races, after making some riding style changes to cope with his young team-mate). Mladin also finished runner up in the Championship to Spies again in 2007, losing by one point.

Mladin is a three-time winner of the Daytona 200 (2000, 2001, 2004). He has also made wild card appearances in Superbike World Championship races, taking pole position in the class at Mazda Raceway Laguna Seca in 2003.

On 20 August 2008, AMA Pro Racing issued a press release announcing the disqualification of Mladin from the previous weekend's AMA Superbike National round at Virginia International Raceway. The press release indicated that the crankshaft from Mladin's bike was found, after comparison with a stock "control" part kept by the AMA, to have violated Superbike class rules, which require an essentially stock crankshaft to be used. The Team Rockstar Makita Yoshimura Suzuki's appeal of the penalty was summarily dismissed as being, "without merit," by AMA/DMG on 5 September 2008.

As a result, with only one round remaining in the championship, Ben Spies' numerical advantage in the championship points became unassailable and Mladin lost the championship for the 3rd year in a row to Spies. It is a known that all Yoshimura bikes on that day had the same crankshaft. Mladin's bike was the only one inspected. Upon his disqualification, Spies and Hayden were moved up the ladder into first and second placings, also riding illegal bikes.

On 31 July 2009, Mladin announced that he would retire from the AMA Superbike Championship at the end of the season, and the announcement came as Mladin refused to take part in that weekend's round at Heartland Park, Kansas due to concerns over rider safety at the circuit: Mladin is known for his campaign for improved rider safety through improvements into the circuits. He won the 2009 AMA Superbike championship, and then retired.

In 2024, Mladin was inducted into the AMA Motorcycle Hall of Fame during a ceremony held in Pickerington, Ohio.

== Personal ==
Mladin lives in Wollongong, New South Wales, with his fiancé whom he proposed to in late June, 2025. In 1998 he commented that "I don't enjoy all the press side of things at all, I enjoy my racing and I enjoy winning like nothing else.".

== Career statistics ==
=== Grand Prix ===
Year	Class	Team	Machine	1	2	3	4	5	6	7	8	9	10	11	12	13	14	Points	Rank
1993	500cc	Cagiva Team Agostini	GP500	AUS; 9	MAL; 10	JPN; Ret	ESP; Ret	AUT; 10	GER; 7	NED; Ret	EUR	SMR; 9	GBR	CZE	ITA; Ret	USA; Ret	FIM; 6	45	13th

=== AMA Pro Racing ===
Season	Class	Team	Bike	DAY (Florida)	FON (California)		RAT (Georgia (U.S. state))		BAR (Alabama)		INF (California)		RAM (Wisconsin)		LAG (California)	M-O (Ohio)		HRT (Kansas)		VIR (Virginia)		N-J (New Jersey)		Pts	Pos
Season	Class	Team	Bike	R1	R1	R2	R1	R2	R1	R2	R1	R2	R1	R2	R1	R1	R2	R1	R2	R1	R2	R1	R2	Pts	Pos
2009	SBK	Yoshimura	Suzuki GSX-R1000	1	1	1	1	1	1	1	5	1	1	2	1	3	7	DNS	DNS	2	9	24	2	453	1st

Year	Class	Team	Bike	DAY (Florida)	BAR (Alabama)		FON (California)		INF (California)		MIL (Utah)		RAM (Wisconsin)		LAG (California)	M-O (Ohio)		VIR (Virginia)		RAT (Georgia (U.S. state))		LAG (California)	Pts	Pos
Year	Class	Team	Bike	R1	R1	R2	R1	R2	R1	R2	R1	R2	R1	R2	R1	R1	R2	R1	R2	R1	R2	R1	Pts	Pos
2008	SBK	Yoshimura	Suzuki GSX-R1000	1	1	1	2	2	2	2	DNF	4	2	1	1	1	1	DSQ	DSQ	1	2	1	557	2nd

Year	Class	Team	Bike	DAY (Florida)	BAR (Alabama)		FON (California)		INF (California)		RAM (Wisconsin)		MIL (Utah)		LAG (California)	M-O (Ohio)		VIR (Virginia)		RAT (Georgia (U.S. state))		LAG (California)	Pts	Pos
Year	Class	Team	Bike	R1	R1	R2	R1	R2	R1	R2	R1	R2	R1	R2	R1	R1	R2	R1	R2	R1	R2	R1	Pts	Pos
2007	SBK	Yoshimura	Suzuki GSX-R1000	11	1	1	2	1	1	1	1	3	2	3	2	1	1	1	1	1	1	2	651	2nd

Year	Class	Team	Bike	DAY (Florida)	BAR (Alabama)		FON (California)		INF (California)		RAM (Wisconsin)		MIL (Utah)		LAG (California)	M-O (Ohio)		VIR (Virginia)		RAT (Georgia (U.S. state))		M-O (Ohio)	Pts	Pos
Year	Class	Team	Bike	R1	R1	R2	R1	R2	R1	R2	R1	R2	R1	R2	R1	R1	R2	R1	R2	R1	R2	R1	Pts	Pos
2006	SBK	Yoshimura	Suzuki GSX-R1000	1	2	3	2	2	2	2	1	1	2	2	6	2	2	1	1	1	1	1	641	2nd

Year	Class	Team	1	2		3		4		5	6		7	8		9		10		11		Pos	Pts
Year	Class	Team	R1	R1	R2	R1	R2	R1	R2	R1	R1	R2	R1	R1	R2	R1	R2	R1	R2	R1	R2	Pos	Pts
2004	SuperBike	Suzuki	DAY; 1	FON; 1	FON; 1	INF; 1	INF; 4	BAR; 1	BAR; 3	PPK; 6	RAM; 2	RAM; 3	BRD; 3	LAG; 2		M-O; 1	M-O; 3	RAT; 1	RAT; 1	VIR; 6	VIR; 4	1st	584
2005	SuperBike	Suzuki	DAY; 1	BAR; 1	BAR; 1	FON; 29	FON; 1	INF; 1	INF; 1	PPK; 4	RAM; 2	RAM; 1	LAG; 2	M-O; 1	M-O; 30	VIR; 1	VIR; 1	RAT; 1	RAT; 4			1st	536

Preceded by Aaron Slight	Australian Superbike Champion; 1992	Succeeded by Troy Corser
Preceded by Ben Bostrom	AMA Superbike Champion; 1999–2001	Succeeded by Nicky Hayden
Preceded by Nicky Hayden	AMA Superbike Champion; 2003–2005	Succeeded by Ben Spies
Preceded by Ben Spies	AMA Superbike Champion; 2009	Succeeded by Josh Hayes
