= Jason DiSalvo =

American motorcycle racer

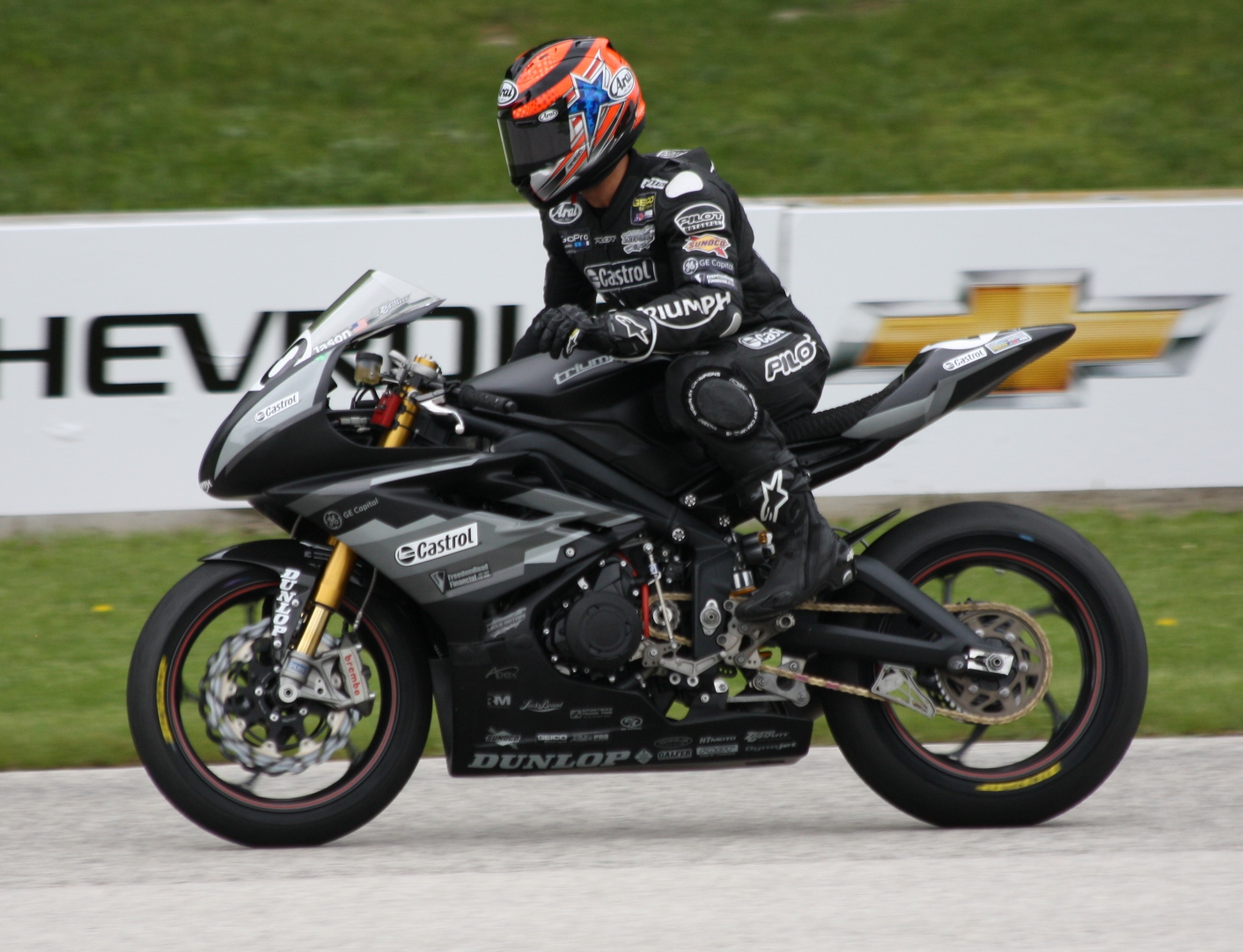
- DiSalvo racing his Sport Bike at Road America in 2013
- Nationality: American
- Born: 9 February 1984 (age 42); Stafford, New York, United States

Jason DiSalvo is an American former professional Grand Prix motorcycle racer. He was the planned rider of the Castrol Rocket streamliner built to challenge the motorcycle land speed record, before being replaced by Guy Martin.

== Career statistics ==
=== By season ===
Season	Class	Motorcycle	Team	Number	Race	Win	Podium	Pole	FLap	Pts	Plcd
1999	125cc	Honda	Polini / Alien Racing	99	2	0	0	0	0	0	NC
2001	250cc	Honda	Cruise America G.P. Racing	62	3	0	0	0	0	0	NC
2010	Moto2	FTR	GP Tech	42	1	0	0	0	0	7	32nd
Total					6	0	0	0	0	7	

==== Races by year ====
(key)

Year	Class	Bike	1	2	3	4	5	6	7	8	9	10	11	12	13	14	15	16	17	Pos.	Pts
1999	125cc	Honda	MAL	JPN	SPA	FRA	ITA	CAT	NED	GBR	GER	CZE	IMO	VAL	AUS	RSA	BRA; 25	ARG; Ret		NC	0
2001	250cc	Honda	JPN	RSA	SPA	FRA	ITA	CAT	NED; Ret	GBR; 22	GER	CZE; 26	POR	VAL	PAC	AUS	MAL	BRA		NC	0
2010	Moto2	FTR Moto	QAT	SPA	FRA	ITA	GBR	NED	CAT	GER	CZE	INP; 9	RSM	ARA	JPN	MAL	AUS	POR	VAL	32nd	7

=== MotoAmerica Superstock Championship ===
==== By year ====
Year	Class	Bike	1	2	3	4	5	6	7	8	9	10	11	Pos	Pts
2004	Superstock	Yamaha	DAY; 6	FON; 4	INF; 5	BAR; 7	PPK; 4	RAM; 4	BRD; 3	LAG; 5	M-O; 1	RAT; 5	VIR; 1	4th	312
2005	Superstock	Yamaha	DAY; 5	BAR; 2	FON; 1	INF; 3	PPK; 4	RAM; 3	LAG; 2	M-O; 2	VIR; 3	RAT; 2		2nd	314
2006	Superstock	Yamaha	DAY; 2	BAR; 3	FON; 1	INF; 18	RAM; 3	MIL; 4	LAG; 4	OHI; 6	VIR; 3	RAT; 3	OHI; 1	3rd	319

=== AMA Supersport Championship ===
==== By year ====
Year	Class	Bike	1	2	3	4	5	6	7	8	9	10	11	Pos	Pts
2004	Supersport	Yamaha	DAY; 1	FON; 6	INF; 4	BAR; Ret	PPK; 3	RAM; 4	BRD; 3	LAG; 2	M-O; Ret	RAT; 3	VIR; 1	5th	274
2005	Supersport	Yamaha	DAY; 3	BAR; 4	FON; 4	INF; 2	PPK; 29	RAM; 3	LAG; 1	M-O; 4	VIR; 3	RAT; 2		3rd	272

=== AMA Formula Xtreme Championship ===
==== By year ====
Year	Class	Bike	1	2	3	4	5	6	7	8	9	10	11	Pos	Pts
2006	Formula Xtreme	Yamaha	DAY; 3	BAR; 1	FON; 2	INF; 2	RAM; 3	MIL; 4	LAG; 2	OHI; 3	VIR; 3	RAT; 3	OHI; 3	3rd	342

=== AMA SuperBike Championship ===
Year	Class	Team	1	2		3		4		5		6		7	8		9		10		11	Pos	Pts
Year	Class	Team	R1	R1	R2	R1	R2	R1	R2	R1	R2	R1	R2	R1	R1	R2	R1	R2	R1	R2	R1	Pos	Pts
2007	SuperBike	Yamaha	DAY; 6	BAR; 9	BAR; 7	FON; 9	FON; 10	INF; 4	INF; 6	RAM; 8	RAM; 14	MIL; 9	MIL; 7	LAG; 7	OHI; 7	OHI; Ret	VIR; 7	VIR; Ret	RAT; Ret	RAT; 20	LAG; 7	9th	358
2008	SuperBike	Yamaha	DAY; 3	BAR; 2	BAR; 4	FON; 8	FON; 5	INF; 7	INF; 17	MIL; 7	MIL; 8	RAM; 7	RAM; 12	LAG; 8	OHI; 4	OHI; 7	VIR; 4	VIR; 8	RAT; 6	RAT; 5	LAG; 8	3rd	463
