= Michael Barnes (motorcyclist) =

American motorcycle racer

- Nationality: American
- Born: October 21, 1968 (age 58); Norwalk, Connecticut, U.S
Motorcycle racing career statistics
MotoGP World Championship
Active years	2013
Manufacturers	BCL
Championships	0
2013 championship position	NC (0 pts)
Starts / Wins / Podiums / Poles / F. laps / Points; 0 / 0 / 0 / 0 / 0 / 0

Michael Barnes (born October 21, 1968) is an American motorcycle racer.

== Career statistics ==
=== AMA Formula Xtreme Championship ===
==== By year ====
Year	Class	Bike	1	2	3	4	5	6	7	8	9	10	11	Pos	Pts
2004	Formula Xtreme	Buell	DAY	FON	INF; 8	BAR; 10	PPK; 9	RAM; 11	BRD; 6	LAG; Ret	M-O; 20	RAT; Ret	VIR; Ret	13th	122
2005	Formula Xtreme	Suzuki	DAY; 7	BAR	FON	INF	PPK; 6	RAM; 3	LAG	M-O; 4	VIR; 5	RAT; 3		6th	160
2006	Formula Xtreme	Suzuki	DAY	BAR	FON	INF; 5	RAM; 4	MIL; 7	LAG; 5	OHI; 5	VIR; 5	RAT; 5	OHI; 4	6th	208

=== AMA Supersport Championship ===
==== By year ====
Year	Class	Bike	1	2	3	4	5	6	7	8	9	10	11	Pos	Pts
2004	Supersport	Yamaha	DAY; 16	FON; 9	INF; 11	BAR; 8	PPK; 11	RAM; 8	BRD; 9	LAG; 8	M-O; 5	RAT; 9	VIR; 9	7th	248
2005	Supersport	Yamaha	DAY; 7	BAR	FON	INF	PPK	RAM	LAG	M-O	VIR	RAT		35th	24
2006	Supersport	Suzuki	DAY; Ret	BAR; 7	FON; 2	INF; C	RAM; 3	MIL; 10	LAG; 5	OHI; 3	VIR; 3	RAT; 3	OHI; 2	3rd	252

=== AMA Superstock Championship ===
==== By year ====
Year	Class	Bike	1	2	3	4	5	6	7	8	9	10	Pos	Pts
2005	Superstock	Suzuki	DAY	BAR	FON	INF	PPK; 5	RAM; 6	LAG; 20	M-O; 7	VIR; 10	RAT; 7	16th	131

=== MotoAmerica Twins Championship ===
==== Races by year ====
Year	Class	Team	1	2	3	4	5	6	7	8	9	10	11	Pos	Pts
2019	Twins	Ducati	ATL; 1	ATL; 1	VIR; Ret	RAM; 3	UMC; 2	MON; 2	SON; Ret	PIT; 3	PIT; 3	NJR; 5	ALA; 2	3rd	169

=== Grand Prix motorcycle racing ===
==== By season ====
Season	Class	Motorcycle	Team	Number	Race	Win	Podium	Pole	FLap	Pts	Plcd
2013	MotoGP	BCL	GP Tech	44	0	0	0	0	0	0	NC
Total					0	0	0	0	0	0	

==== Races by year ====
(key)

Year	Class	Bike	1	2	3	4	5	6	7	8	9	10	11	12	13	14	15	16	17	18	Pos	Pts
2013	MotoGP	BCL	QAT	AME; DNQ	SPA	FRA	ITA	CAT	NED	GER	USA	INP	CZE	GBR	RSM	ARA	MAL	AUS	JPN	VAL	NC	0
