= Steve Rapp =

American motorcycle racer

- Nationality: American
- Born: November 18, 1971 (age 55); Lafayette, California
- Current team: I.M. Racing Hayes BMW
- Bike number: 15
Motorcycle racing career statistics
MotoGP World Championship
Active years	2012
Manufacturers	APR
2012 championship position	26th (2 pts)
Starts / Wins / Podiums / Poles / F. laps / Points; 1 / 0 / 0 / 0 / 0 / 2

Steve Rapp (born November 18, 1971, in Lafayette, California) is an American former motorcyclist who turned professional in 1996 and is now an airline pilot. He raced in the MotoAmerica Superstock 1000 Championship aboard a BMW S1000RR.

== Career ==
Rapp gets wildcard race at Indianapolis and thus became the then-oldest Rookie to début in MotoGP class era at 41 years old (similar to Toshio Suzuki's feat at 1993 Japanese Grand Prix in Formula One).

== Career Statistic ==
=== MotoAmerica Superstock Championship ===
==== By year ====
Year	Class	Bike	1	2	3	4	5	6	7	8	9	10	11	Pos	Pts
2004	Superstock	Suzuki	DAY; 9	FON; 8	INF; 7	BAR; 6	PPK; 8	RAM; 9	BRD; 10	LAG; 12	M-O; 9	RAT; 10	VIR; 9	7th	244
2005	Superstock	Suzuki	DAY; 8	BAR; 6	FON; 3	INF; 4	PPK; 6	RAM; 8	LAG; 6	M-O; 3	VIR; 7	RAT; 6		3rd	255
2006	Superstock	Suzuki	DAY; Ret	BAR; 7	FON; 6	INF; 7	RAM; 6	MIL; 6	LAG; 5	OHI; Ret	VIR; 6	RAT; 5	OHI; 4	7th	227

=== AMA Supersport Championship ===
==== By year ====
Year	Class	Bike	1	2	3	4	5	6	7	8	9	10	11	Pos	Pts
2004	Supersport	Suzuki	DAY; 9	FON; 7	INF; 12	BAR; 5	PPK; 6	RAM; 15	BRD; 17	LAG; 6	M-O; 6	RAT; 8	VIR; 5	6th	255
2007	Supersport	Kawasaki	DAY; 7	BAR; 3	FON; 4	INF; 6	RAM; 8	MIL; 10	LAG; 3	OHI	VIR; 7	RAT; 7	LAG; 10	4th	247

=== AMA Formula Xtreme Championship ===
==== By year ====
Year	Class	Bike	1	2	3	4	5	6	7	8	9	10	11	Pos	Pts
2007	Formula Xtreme	Kawasaki	DAY; 1	BAR; 3	FON; 6	INF; 3	RAM; 2	MIL; 6	LAG	OHI; 9	VIR; 7	RAT; 4	LAG; 3	2nd	279

=== AMA Pro Road Racing ===
Year	Class	Team	1	2		3		4		5	6		7	8		9		10		Pos	Pts
Year	Class	Team	R1	R1	R2	R1	R2	R1	R2	R1	R1	R2	R1	R1	R2	R1	R2	R1	R2	Pos	Pts
2005	SuperBike	Suzuki	DAY; 10	BAR; 7	BAR; Ret	FON; 8	FON; 7	INF; 6	INF; Ret	PPK; 6	RAM; Ret	RAM; 8	LAG; 8	M-O; 18	M-O; 6	VIR; 11	VIR; 9	RAT; 15	RAT; 10	8th	305

Year	Class	Team	Bike	DAY (Florida)		INF (California)		MIL (Utah)	RAM (Wisconsin)		BAR (Alabama)		M-O (Ohio)		LAG (California)	N-J (New Jersey)		Pts	Pos
Year	Class	Team	Bike	R1	R2	R1	R2	R1	R1	R2	R1	R2	R1	R2	R1	R1	R2	Pts	Pos
2011	SBK	San Diego BMW Motorsports	BMW S1000RR			6	4	5	17	6	12	4	8	Ret	7			139	9th
2011	SBK	Cycle World Attack Performance	Kawasaki Ninja ZX-10R													6	19*	139	9th

Year	Class	Team	Bike	DAY (Florida)	BAR (Alabama)		FON (California)		INF (California)		RAM (Wisconsin)		MIL (Utah)		LAG (California)	M-O (Ohio)		VIR (Virginia)		RAT (Georgia (U.S. state))		M-O (Ohio)	Pts	Pos
Year	Class	Team	Bike	R1	R1	R2	R1	R2	R1	R2	R1	R2	R1	R2	R1	R1	R2	R1	R2	R1	R2	R1	Pts	Pos
2006	SBK	Michael Jordan Motorsports Suzuki	Suzuki	DNF	11	12	12	11	9	9	10	11	11	9	10	6	DNF	10	DNF	9	11	DNF	314	11th

=== Grand Prix motorcycle racing ===
(key)

Year	Class	Bike	1	2	3	4	5	6	7	8	9	10	11	12	13	14	15	16	17	18	Pos	Pts
2012	MotoGP	APR	QAT	SPA	POR	FRA	CAT	GBR	NED	GER	ITA	USA; DNQ	INP; 14	CZE	RSM	ARA	JPN	MAL	AUS	VAL	26th	2
