= Jake Zemke =

American motorcycle racer

- Nationality: American
- Born: December 15, 1975 (age 50); San Francisco, California, U.S.
- Current team: None
- Bike number: None

Jake Zemke (born December 15, 1975, in San Francisco, California) is an American former professional motorcycle road racer of partial Japanese ancestry. He turned pro in 1992. Zemke's race number has been 98 for most of his racing career. He started his own riding school called Zemke Riding Development.

== Chronology ==
- 1996 AMA Speedway US National Championship Qualifier
- 1997 3rd (ST), 66th (AMA Formula Xtreme)
- 1998 9th (750SS)
- 1999 52nd (AMA Superbike Championship), 15th (600SS), 2nd (750SS)
- 2000 8th (600SS), 2nd (AMA Formula Xtreme)
- 2001 6th (600SS), 47th (750SS), 4th (AMA Formula Xtreme)- Bruce Transportation Honda
- 2002 8th (AMA Supersport Championship), 2nd (AMA Formula Xtreme) - Bruce Transportation Honda
- 2003 5th (AMA Supersport Championship), 3rd (AMA Formula Xtreme) - Erion Honda
- 2004 3rd (AMA Superbike Championship), 2nd (AMA Formula Xtreme) - American Honda Racing
- 2005 11th (AMA Superbike Championship), 2nd (AMA Formula Xtreme) - American Honda Racing
- 2006 7th (AMA Superbike Championship), 33rd (AMA Formula Xtreme) - American Honda Racing
- 2007 3rd (AMA Superbike Championship) - American Honda Racing
- 2008 1st AMA (Formula Xtreme) and 2nd AMA (Supersport) - Erion Honda
- 2009 6th AMA (Daytona Sportbike) - Erion Honda
- 2010 3rd AMA (American Superbike) -Released from Michael Jordan Motorsports Suzuki
- 2011 28th BSB (British EVO Class) - WFR Honda (Fill in Rider)
- 2012 7th AMA (Daytona SportBike) - Ducshop Ducati
- 2013 16th AMA (Daytona SportBike) - Riders Discount Racing Triumph (Part-Time)
- 2014 7th AMA (Daytona SportBike) -Released from GEICO Motorcycles Honda
- 2015 Retired. Owner of Zemke Riding Development.

== Career statistics ==
=== Superbike World Championship ===
Year	Make	1		2		3		4		5		6		7		8		9		10		11		12		13		14		Pos	Pts	Ref
Year	Make	R1	R2	R1	R2	R1	R2	R1	R2	R1	R2	R1	R2	R1	R2	R1	R2	R1	R2	R1	R2	R1	R2	R1	R2	R1	R2	R1	R2	Pos	Pts	Ref
2009	Honda	AUS	AUS	QAT	QAT	SPA	SPA	NED	NED	ITA; 28	ITA; 20	RSA	RSA	USA; 18	USA; 15	SMR	SMR	GBR	GBR	CZE	CZE	GER	GER	ITA	ITA	FRA	FRA	POR	POR	42nd	1	

=== AMA Superbike ===
Year	Class	Team	1	2		3		4		5		6		7	8		9		10		11		Pos	Pts
Year	Class	Team	R1	R1	R2	R1	R2	R1	R2	R1	R2	R1	R2	R1	R1	R2	R1	R2	R1	R2	R1	R2	Pos	Pts
2004	SuperBike	Honda	DAY; 2	FON; 4	FON; 3	INF; 3	INF; 2	BAR; 2	BAR; 2	PPK; 2		RAM; 3	RAM; 2	BRD; 1	LAG; 7		M-O; 4	M-O; 1	RAT; 4	RAT; 4	VIR; Ret	VIR; DNS	3rd	490
2006	SuperBike	Honda	DAY; 8	BAR; 3	BAR; Ret	FON; 3	FON; 3	INF; 8	INF; 8	RAM; 3	RAM; 3	MIL; 8	MIL; 1	LAG; 8	OHI; 29	OHI; 4	VIR; 6	VIR; 5	RAT; 6	RAT; 8	OHI; 8		7th	447
2007	SuperBike	Honda	DAY; 3	BAR; 6	BAR; 10	FON; 6	FON; 5	INF; 5	INF; 3	RAM; 5	RAM; 6	MIL; 3	MIL; 2	LAG; Ret	OHI; 8	OHI; 5	VIR; 8	VIR; 6	RAT; 5	RAT; 5	LAG; 5		3rd	468

Year	Class	Team	Bike	DAY (Florida)		FON (California)		RAT (Georgia (U.S. state))		INF (California)		RAM (Wisconsin)		M-O (Ohio)		LAG (California)	VIR (Virginia)		N-J (New Jersey)		BAR (Alabama)		Pts	Pos
Year	Class	Team	Bike	R1	R2	R1	R2	R1	R2	R1	R2	R1	R2	R1	R2	R1	R1	R2	R1	R2	R1	R2	Pts	Pos
2010	SBK	Jordan Motorsports	Suzuki GSX-R1000	1	1	2	4	3	4	4	6	5	3	6	6	6	8	8	6	6	Ret	5	332	3rd

=== AMA Formula Xtreme Championship ===
==== By year ====
Year	Class	Bike	1	2	3	4	5	6	7	8	9	10	11	Pos	Pts
2004	Formula Xtreme	Honda	DAY; 3	FON; 2	INF; 2	BAR; 1	PPK; 1	RAM; 2	BRD; 2	LAG; 3	M-O; 21	RAT; 2	VIR; 30	2nd	308
2005	Formula Xtreme	Honda	DAY; 3	BAR; 1	FON; 1	INF; 1	PPK; 1	RAM; 2	LAG	M-O; 1	VIR; 2	RAT; 17		2nd	295

=== British Superbike Championship ===
Year	Class	Make	1		2		3		4		5		6		7		8			9		10		11		12			Pos	Pts	Ref
Year	Class	Make	R1	R2	R1	R2	R1	R2	R1	R2	R1	R2	R1	R2	R1	R2	R1	R2	R3	R1	R2	R1	R2	R1	R2	R1	R2	R3	Pos	Pts	Ref
2011	BSB	Honda	BHI		OUL		CRO		THR		KNO; 21	KNO; 20	SNE; 21	SNE; 10	OUL; 17	OUL; C	BHGP; 14	BHGP; 19	BHGP; 18	CAD	CAD	DON	DON	SIL	SIL	BHGP	BHGP	BHGP	24th*	8*	
2011	E^{1}	Honda	BHI		OUL		CRO		THR		KNO; 21	KNO; 20	SNE; 21	SNE; 10	OUL; 17	OUL; C	BHGP; 14	BHGP; 19	BHGP; 18	CAD	CAD	DON	DON	SIL	SIL	BHGP	BHGP	BHGP	9th*	107*	

1. – E Denotes riders participating in the Evo class within the British Superbike Championship.
