= List of AMA Superbike Championship circuits =

This is a list of AMA Superbike Championship and MotoAmerica circuits that have hosted a race from 1976 through 2026.

Key
✔	Current circuits (for the 2026 season) are shown in **bold**.
*	Future circuits (for the 2027 season) are shown in italic.

Circuit	Location	Seasons	Total	Map
Alabama International Motor Speedway	Talladega, Alabama	1980–1983	4	
Atlanta Motor Speedway	Henry County, Georgia	1993–1994	2	
**Barber Motorsports Park** ✔	Birmingham, Alabama	2003–2026	24	
Brainerd International Raceway	Brainerd, Minnesota	1983–1987, 1992–2004, 2021–2024	22	
Bryar Motorsports Park	Loudon, New Hampshire	1976–1989 (2 races in 1978)	15	
California Speedway	Fontana, California	2002–2010	9	
Charlotte Motor Speedway	Concord, North Carolina	1977, 1980, 1991–1993	5	
**Circuit of the Americas** ✔	Austin, Texas	2015–2019, 2022–2026	10	
**Daytona International Speedway** (Included in the Supersport Championship instead of Superbike Championship)✔	Daytona Beach, Florida	1976–2014, 2022–present (2 races in 1980–1985)	50	
Firebird International Raceway	Chandler, Arizona	1995	1	
Gateway International Raceway	Madison, Illinois	1995	1	
Heartland Park Topeka	Topeka, Kansas	1989–1991, 2009	4	
Homestead-Miami Speedway	Homestead, Florida	1996, 2012	2	
Indianapolis Motor Speedway	Speedway, Indiana	2015, 2020	2	
**Las Vegas Motor Speedway** *	Las Vegas, Nevada	1996–1998, 2027	3	
Memphis Motorsports Park	Millington, Tennessee	1987	1	
Miami Bicentennial Park	Miami, Florida	1990–1991	1	
**Mid-Ohio Sports Car Course** ✔	Troy Township, Morrow County, Ohio	1983–2014, 2024–present	35	
Moroso Motorsports Park	Jupiter, Florida	1982	1	
New Hampshire Motor Speedway	Loudon, New Hampshire	1990–2001	12	
**New Jersey Motorsports Park** ✔	Millville, New Jersey	2009–present	18	
NOLA Motorsports Park	Avondale, Louisiana	2012	1	
Phoenix Raceway	Avondale, Arizona	1992–1993, 1997–1999	5	
Pikes Peak International Raceway	Fountain, Colorado	1997–2005	9	
Pittsburgh International Race Complex	Wampum, Pennsylvania	2017–2023	7	
Pocono International Raceway	Long Pond, Pennsylvania	1977–1978, 1980–1986	9	
Pomona Fairplex	Pomona, California	1994–1996	3	
Portland International Raceway	Portland, Oregon	1983–1984	2	
Riverside International Raceway	Moreno Valley, California	1976–1977, 1982–1984	5	
**Road America** ✔	Elkhart Lake, Wisconsin	1980–present (2 races in 2020)	48	
**Road Atlanta** ✔	Braselton, Georgia	1980, 1987, 1989–1990, 1998–2010, 2012, 2015–present (2 races in 1980)	31	
Seattle International Raceways	Lake Morton-Berrydale, Washington	1981–1983, 1985	4	
Sonoma Raceway	Sonoma, California	1977–1979, 1982–1988, 1993–1999, 2001–2012, 2017–2019 (2 races in 1984–1985)	34	
Texas World Speedway	College Station, Texas	1991–1992 (2 races in 1992)	3	
**The Ridge Motorsports Park** ✔	Shelton, Washington	2020–present	7	
**Virginia International Raceway** ✔	Danville, Virginia	2001–2010, 2015–2019, 2021–2022, 2025–present	19	
**WeatherTech Raceway Laguna Seca** ✔	Monterey, California	1976–1988, 1992–2013, 2015–present	47	
**West Desert** *	Tooele, Utah	2006–2008, 2011–2013, 2015–2019	11	
Willow Springs Raceway	Rosamond, California	1983–1985, 1990, 1998–2000	7	
