= 2021 MotoAmerica Junior Cup =

The 2021 MotoAmerica Junior Cup season was the 7th season of the Junior Cup class in MotoAmerica competition.

== Calendar and results ==
Round	Circuit	Date	Race 1 Winner	Race 2 Winner
1	(Georgia (U.S. state)) Michelin Raceway Road Atlanta	April 30–May 2	(United States) Tyler Scott	(United States) Benjamin Gloddy
2	Virginia International Raceway	May 21–23	(United States) Tyler Scott	(United States) Cody Wyman
3	(Wisconsin) Road America	June 11–13	(United States) Tyler Scott	(United States) Gus Rodio
4	(Washington (state)) The Ridge Motorsports Park	June 25–27	(United States) Maxwell Toth	(United States) Tyler Scott
5	(California) WeatherTech Raceway Laguna Seca	July 9–11	(United States) Tyler Scott	(United States) Tyler Scott
6	(Minnesota) Brainerd International Raceway	July 30–August 1	(United States) Benjamin Gloddy	(United States) Tyler Scott
7	(Pennsylvania) Pittsburgh International Race Complex	August 13–15	(United States) Benjamin Gloddy	(United States) Tyler Scott
8	New Jersey Motorsports Park	September 10–12	(United States) Tyler Scott	(United States) Tyler Scott
9	(Alabama) Barber Motorsports Park	September 17–19	(United States) Tyler Scott	(United States) Tyler Scott

== Teams and riders ==
2021 Entry List
Team	Constructor	No.	Rider	Rounds
Altus Motorsports	Kawasaki	69	(United States) Hayden Bicknese	All
Bad Boys Racing	Kawasaki	99	(United States) Avery Dreher	1–4, 7, 9
BARTCON Racing	Kawasaki	21	(United States) Jacob Crossman	8
BARTCON Racing	Kawasaki	31	(United States) Kayla Yaakov	4–9
BARTCON Racing	Kawasaki	73	(United States) Keagan Brown	2, 3
Bauce Racing/Cybersafe Solutions/JL62 Racing	Kawasaki	62	(United States) Joseph LiMandri Jr	2, 3, 7–9
BRB Racing	Kawasaki	41	(United States) Brady Fors	3, 6
Cale Essman Racing	Kawasaki	51	(United States) Cale Essman	1–5, 7–9
Calishine Racing	Kawasaki	13	(United States) Owen Williams	3–9
Calishine Racing	Kawasaki	55	(United States) Aden Thao	1–6
Calishine Racing Team	Kawasaki	66	(Thailand) Axel Pedersen	6, 7
Cycle Pros Racing	Kawasaki	23	(United States) Jake Vandal	3, 6, 9
Cycle Pros Racing	KTM	98	(United States) Drew Vandal	3, 6
Dez Racing	Kawasaki	81	(United States) Dezrae Caldwell	9
Fluidology	Kawasaki	85	(United States) Charles Ceparano	1
JPH Suspension/WonderCBD Racing	Kawasaki	25	(United States) Andrew Gawer	5
JR12/Westby Racing	Yamaha	12	(United Kingdom) Jack Roach	All
Keagan Brown Racing	Yamaha	73	(United States) Keagan Brown	2, 3
KERmoto	Kawasaki	34	(United States) Cody Wyman	1–7
Landers Racing	Kawasaki	72	(United States) Benjamin Gloddy	All
Lawson Racing	Kawasaki	67	(United States) Brendan Lawson	9
MonkeyMoto AGVSPORT	Kawasaki	14	(United States) Chase Black	1–7, 9
N2 Racing	Yamaha	22	(United States) Blake Davis	All
PDR Motorsports	Kawasaki	99	(United States) Avery Dreher	1–4, 7, 9
Rodio Racing	Kawasaki	96	(United States) Gus Rodio	All
S&R Racing	Kawasaki	71	(United States) Ryan Cresap	3–5
Scott Powersports/KTM	KTM	70	(United States) Tyler Scott	All
Singh Racing	Kawasaki	54	(United States) Dylan Singh	8
SportbikeTrackGear.com	Kawasaki	48	(United States) Max VanDenBrouck	All
Team ECB Racing	Kawasaki	92	(United States) Eli Block	2, 7, 8
TEK Moto Performance	Kawasaki	15	(United States) Alex Ricci	All
Veloce Racing	Kawasaki	29	(United States) David Kohlstaedt	All
Veloce Racing	Kawasaki	58	(United States) Maxwell Toth	1–4, 6
Veloce Racing	Kawasaki	65	(United States) Spencer Humphreys	7–9

== Championship standings ==
Scoring system

Points are awarded to the top fifteen finishers. A rider has to finish the race to earn points.

Position	1st	2nd	3rd	4th	5th	6th	7th	8th	9th	10th	11th	12th	13th	14th	15th
Points	25	20	16	13	11	10	9	8	7	6	5	4	3	2	1

Pos	Rider	Bike	RAT (Georgia (U.S. state))		VIR (Virginia)		RAM (Wisconsin)		RID (Washington (state))		MON (California)		BRA (Minnesota)		PIT (Pennsylvania)		NJE (New Jersey)		ALA (Alabama)		Pts
Pos	Rider	Bike	R1	R2	R1	R2	R1	R2	R1	R2	R1	R2	R1	R2	R1	R2	R1	R2	R1	R2	Pts
1	(United States) Tyler Scott	KTM	1	2	3	4	1	2	4	1	1	1	2	1	4	1	1	1	1	1	390
2	(United States) Benjamin Gloddy	Kawasaki	2	1	1	2	3	7	2	2	2	2	1	3	1	2	4	3	3	2	346
3	(United States) Gus Rodio	Kawasaki	4	6	5	7	5	1	5	4	4	5	5	5	5	5	2	2	Ret	9	218
4	(United States) David Kohlstaedt	Kawasaki	3	5	2		10	10	3	3	3	3	6	6	3	6	8	4	10	3	212
5	(United States) Cody Wyman	Kawasaki	5	3	4	1	2	6	6	5	5	4	4	2	Ret	4					186
6	(United States) Blake Davis	Yamaha	Ret	7	8	8	4	5	8	7	Ret	10	11	10	10	8	6	8	7	5	135
7	(United States) Max VanDenBrouck	Kawasaki	6	8	6	6	7	4	7	Ret	Ret	8	9	9	8	9	9		6	6	133
8	(United States) Kayla Yaakov	Kawasaki							9	6	9	9	10	7	6	7	7	6	2	4	117
9	(United States) Maxwell Toth	Kawasaki	Ret	4	Ret	3	6	3	1	Ret			3	4							109
10	(United States) Joseph LiMandri Jr	Kawasaki			Ret	5	11	9							2	3	3	5	4	Ret	99
11	(United Kingdom) Jack Roach	Yamaha	8	13	Ret		14	18	12	9	6	6	8	11	7	DNS	DNS		5	8	85
12	(United States) Hayden Bicknese	Kawasaki	7	9	Ret	11	8	12	Ret	Ret	7	7	15	DNS	11	12	11	10	12	Ret	76
13	(United States) Aden Thao	Kawasaki	9	11	9	13	9	Ret	10	8	11	11	13	8							64
14	(United States) Owen Williams	Kawasaki					12	8	14	11	8	12	7	12	12	14	12	12	13	16	61
15	(United States) Chase Black	Kawasaki	10	12	11	10	15	Ret	11	10	10	Ret	12	13	13	13			8	17	60
16	(United States) Eli Block	Kawasaki			7	12									9	11	5	9			43
17	(United States) Avery Dreher	Kawasaki	DNS	10	10	9	13	11	Ret	DNS					15	Ret			Ret	7	37
18	(United States) Spencer Humphreys	Kawasaki													14	10	Ret	7	9	11	29
19	(United States) Cale Essman	Kawasaki	11	14	12	14	19	15	Ret	13	Ret	14			17	15	Ret	14	Ret	13	25
20	(United States) Alex Ricci	Kawasaki	13	15	13	15	20	17	15	14	13	15	DNS	17	18	16	15	15	Ret	18	17
21	(United States) Ryan Cresap	Kawasaki					17	14	13	12	12	13									16
22	(United States) Suhaib Salem	Kawasaki															10	11			11
23	(United States) Jake Vandal	Kawasaki					18	16					Ret	15					11	12	10
24	(United States) Yandel Medina	Kawasaki																	Ret	10	6
25	(United States) Jacob Crossman	Kawasaki															13	13			6
26	(United States) Brady Fors	Kawasaki					16	13					14	Ret							5
27	(United States) Charles Ceparano	Kawasaki	12	DNS																	4
28	(United States) Brendan Lawson	Kawasaki																	15	14	3
29	(United States) Dezrae Caldwell	Kawasaki																	14	15	3
30	(United States) Dylan Singh	Kawasaki															14				2
31	(Thailand) Axel Pedersen	Kawasaki											16	14	16	DNS					2
32	(United States) Keagan Brown	Kawasaki			14		Ret	Ret													2
33	(United States) Andrew Gawer	Kawasaki									DSQ	DSQ									0
34	(United States) Drew Vandal	KTM					21	19					17	16							0
