= Sean Dylan Kelly =

American motorcycle racer

- Born: May 17, 2002 (age 24); Hollywood, Florida, U.S.
- Current team: OrangeCat Racing
- Bike number: 40
Motorcycle racing career statistics
Moto2 World Championship
Active years	2019, 2022–2023
Manufacturers	KTM, Kalex, Forward
2023 championship position	29th (1 pt)
Starts / Wins / Podiums / Poles / F. laps / Points; 35 / 0 / 0 / 0 / 0 / 6.5
AMA Superbike Championship / MotoAmerica
Active years	2023-
Manufacturers	Suzuki GSX-R1000 (M4 Ecstar), BMW M1000RR (OrangeCat)
Starts / Wins / Podiums / Poles / F. laps / Points; 0 / 0 / 0 / 0 / 0 / 0

Sean Dylan Kelly (born May 17, 2002) is an American motorcycle racer racing for OrangeCat Racing in the 2026 MotoAmerica Superbike Championship. He previously competed in MotoAmerica Superbike and Supersport with the M4 Ecstar Suzuki and TopPro Racing teams, winning the Supersport championship in 2021. Kelly also had a two-year stint racing in Moto2, contesting 35 races.

== Career ==
=== Supersport ===
In 2019, Kelly made his AMA Supersport debut aboard a Suzuki GSX-R600 with M4 Ecstar. He recorded two victories in his first season, both at the Pittsburgh International Race Complex. With five additional podium finishes, Kelly finished the season in fourth place.

For the 2020 season, Kelly built on his success with five race wins, 11 more podium finishes, and three pole positions. After a DNF in the first round, Kelly went on a 13-race run of podium finishes and won the final two races at Laguna Seca. He finished the season second in the championship, behind Richie Escalante.

Continuing his upward climb in Supersport, Kelly dominated the 2021 Championship. He finished every race, taking 12 victories, every pole position, and only failing to make the podium once. His second-place finish in Race 2 at New Jersey sealed the championship one round before the end of the season.

=== Moto2 World Championship ===
==== 2019-2023 ====
In 2019, Kelly made his Grand Prix motorcycle racing debut in the Moto2 category; he entered the Valencian Community Grand Prix replacing Spanish racer Iker Lecuona in American Racing KTM. He qualified in 27th position and in the race he dropped out with two laps remaining.

On September 18, 2021, Kelly signed a two-year contract with American Racing to contest the 2022 Moto2 championship. He was joined on the American Racing Team by then five-time AMA Superbike champion, Cameron Beaubier. In 20 starts on a Kalex, he failed to reach a podium and ended the season with 5.5 points.

Hindered by an arm injury, the 2023 season was less successful. Kelly left ART mid-season, ultimately riding for Forward Racing. In 14 starts, Kelly was only able to score a single point.

=== Superbike ===
==== 2024 ====
Kelly returned to the MotoAmerica series for the 2024 season, this time in the Superbike championship on a TopPro Racing BMW M1000RR. He finished fourth in the standings with a win at Circuit of the Americas and seven podium finishes.

==== 2025 ====
Kelly rejoined the Team Hammer M4 Ecstar team for the 2025 Superbike season, astride a Suzuki GSX-R1000. While frequently competitive, he couldn't match the success of the prior season. He finished on the podium only three times, all second place finishes. Kelly ended the season in fifth place in the championship, but in front of his teammate, Richie Escalante.

==== 2026 ====
On 9 December 2025, OrangeCat Racing announced that Kelly would join them in the team's inaugural Superbike season alongside teammate Jayson Uribe, moving up from Stock 1000. The team will field two BMW M1000RRs as they take over the position as the American flagship Superbike team for BMW, vacated after the folding of title-winners Tytler's Cycle Racing. Kelly's crew chief will be Dave Weaver, who guided the Tytler's team from its inception to the 2025 MotoAmerica Superbike Championship with Kelly's former Moto2 teammate, Cameron Beaubier.

== Career statistics ==
=== Red Bull MotoGP Rookies Cup ===
==== Races by year ====
(key) (Races in bold indicate pole position; races in italics indicate fastest lap)

Year	1	2	3	4	5	6	7	8	9	10	11	12	13	Pos	Pts
2016	JER1; 18	JER2; 16	ASS1; Ret	ASS2; 15	SAC1; 18	SAC2; 14	RBR1; 20	RBR2; 17	BRN1; 13	BRN2; 19	MIS; 17	ARA1; 16	ARA2; 16	22nd	6
2017	JER1; 7	JER2; Ret	ASS1; Ret	ASS2; 17	SAC1; 21	SAC2; 20	BRN1; 17	BRN2; 8	RBR1; 21	RBR2; 13	MIS; 7	ARA1; 12	ARA2; 9	17th	40
2018	JER1; 8	JER2; 7	ITA; 11	ASS; 6	ASS; Ret	GER1; Ret	GER2; 8	AUT; 10	AUT; 11	MIS; Ret	ARA; 9	ARA; 9		10th	65

=== Grand Prix motorcycle racing ===
==== By season ====
Season	Class	Motorcycle	Team	Race	Win	Podium	Pole	FLap	Pts	Plcd
2019	Moto2	KTM	American Racing KTM	1	0	0	0	0	0	NC
2022	Moto2	Kalex	American Racing	20	0	0	0	0	5.5	29th
2023	Moto2	Kalex	American Racing	8	0	0	0	0	0	29th
2023	Moto2	Forward	Forward Team	6	0	0	0	0	1	29th
Total				**35**	**0**	**0**	**0**	**0**	**6.5**	

==== By class ====
Class	Seasons	1st GP	1st Pod	1st Win	Race	Win	Podiums	Pole	FLap	Pts	WChmp
Moto2	2019, 2022–present	2019 Valencia			35	0	0	0	0	6.5	0
Total	2019–present				**35**	**0**	**0**	**0**	**0**	**6.5**	**0**

==== Races by year ====
(key) (Races in bold indicate pole position; races in italics indicate fastest lap)

Year	Class	Bike	1	2	3	4	5	6	7	8	9	10	11	12	13	14	15	16	17	18	19	20	Pos	Pts
2019	Moto2	KTM	QAT	ARG	AME	SPA	FRA	ITA	CAT	NED	GER	CZE	AUT	GBR	RSM	ARA	THA	JPN	AUS	MAL	VAL; Ret		NC	0
2022	Moto2	Kalex	QAT; 25	INA; Ret	ARG; Ret	AME; 17	POR; 13	SPA; 22	FRA; 20	ITA; 23	CAT; 21	GER; 17	NED; 19	GBR; 22	AUT; Ret	RSM; Ret	ARA; 21	JPN; 19	THA; 11^{‡}	AUS; 18	MAL; 18	VAL; 18	29th	5.5
2023	Moto2	Kalex	POR; 20	ARG; Ret	AME; 18	SPA; Ret	FRA; 16	ITA; 19	GER; 17	NED; Ret	GBR	AUT	CAT										29th*	1*
2023	Moto2	Forward												RSM; 20	IND; 15	JPN; 23	INA	AUS	THA	MAL; 19	QAT; Ret	VAL; 26	29th*	1*

^{‡} Half points awarded as less than two thirds of the race distance (but at least three full laps) was completed.

=== MotoAmerica Supersport Championship ===
==== Races by year ====
Year	Class	Team	1	2	3	4	5	6	7	8	9	10	11	12	13	14	15	16	17	Pos	Pts
2019	Supersport	Suzuki	ATL; 3	ATL; 6	VIR; DNS	VIR; 3	RAM; 3	RAM; 2	UMC; 4	UMC; 5	MON; 4	SON; Ret	SON; 6	PIT; 1	PIT; 1	NJR; 3	NJR; Ret	ALA; 5	ALA; 4	4th	215

Year	Class	Team	1		2		3		4		5		6		7		8		9		Pos	Pts
Year	Class	Team	R1	R2	R1	R2	R1	R2	R1	R2	R1	R2	R1	R2	R1	R2	R1	R2	R1	R2	Pos	Pts
2020	Supersport	Suzuki	RAM; Ret	RAM; 2	RAM; 2	RAM; 2	ATL; 1	ATL; 2	PIT; 2	PIT; 2	TRD; 2	TRD; 1	NJR; 3	NJR; 1	ALA; 2	ALA; 2	BRI; 16	BRI; 2	LGS; 1	LGS; 1	2nd	341
2021	Supersport	Suzuki	ATL; 1	ATL; 1	VIR; 1	VIR; 2	RAM; 6	RAM; 2	RID; 1	RID; 1	MON; 1	MON; 1	BRA; 1	BRA; 1	PIT; 2	PIT; 1	NJR; 1	NJR; 2	ALA; 1	ALA; 2	1st	410

=== MotoAmerica SuperBike Championship ===
==== Results ====
Year	Class	Team	1		2			3		4		5			6		7		8			9			Pos	Pts
Year	Class	Team	R1	R2	R1	R2	R3	R1	R2	R1	R2	R1	R2	R3	R1	R2	R1	R2	R1	R2	R3	R1	R2	R3	Pos	Pts
2024	SuperBike	BMW	ATL; 4	ATL; 5	ALA; 4	ALA; 2	ALA; 3	RAM; Ret	RAM; 6	BRA; 4	BRA; Ret	RID; 17	RID; 5		MON; 4	MON; 3	OHI; 5	OHI; 2	TEX; Ret	TEX; 1	TEX; 3	NJR; 7	NJR; 2		4th	237
2025	SuperBike	Suzuki	ALA; 4	ALA; 4	ATL; 4	ATL; 4		RAM; Ret	RAM; 14	RID; 6	RID; 16	MON; Ret	MON; 4	MON; Ret	VIR; 4	VIR; 2	OHI; 2	OHI; 7	TEX; 5	TEX; 4		NJE; 4	NJE; 5	NJE; 2	5th	207
