= 2021 MotoAmerica Supersport Championship =

The 2021 MotoAmerica Supersport Championship season was the 7th season of the supersport class of motorcycle racing within the MotoAmerica series. Richie Escalante entered the season as the defending champion, picking up his first MotoAmerica supersport title in 2020. However, the 9-round season concluded with Sean Dylan Kelly picking up his first MotoAmerica supersport title. This was enough to secure Kelly a move to Moto2 for 2022.

== Calendar and results ==
Round	Circuit	Date	Race 1 Winner	Race 2 Winner
1	(Georgia (U.S. state)) Road Atlanta	April 30-May 2	(United States) Sean Dylan Kelly	(United States) Sean Dylan Kelly
2	Virginia	May 21–23	(United States) Sean Dylan Kelly	(Mexico) Richie Escalante
3	(Wisconsin) Road America	June 11–13	(United States) Stefano Mesa	(Mexico) Richie Escalante
4	(Washington (state)) The Ridge	June 25–27	(United States) Sean Dylan Kelly	(United States) Sean Dylan Kelly
5	(California) Monterey	July 9–11	(United States) Sean Dylan Kelly	(United States) Sean Dylan Kelly
6	(Minnesota) Brainerd	July 30-August 1	(United States) Sean Dylan Kelly	(United States) Sean Dylan Kelly
7	(Pennsylvania) Pittsburgh	August 13–15	(Mexico) Richie Escalante	(United States) Sean Dylan Kelly
8	New Jersey	September 10–12	(United States) Sean Dylan Kelly	(South Africa) Samuel Lochoff
9	Alabama	September 17–19	(United States) Sean Dylan Kelly	(United States) Gabriel Da Silva

== Teams and riders ==
2021 Entry List
Team	Constructor	No.	Rider	Rounds
HONOS Racing Team	Kawasaki	1	(Mexico) Richie Escalante	All
Campbell Racing	Kawasaki	10	(United States) Steven Campbell	4
Blackall Racing LLC	Yamaha	11	(United States) Tony Blackall	1–6, 8–9
Team Velocity Racing	Yamaha	13	(United States) Chuck Ivey	1–2, 9
Team Posse	MV Agusta	15	(United States) Jeremiah Walker	5
Altus Motorsports	Suzuki	16	(El Salvador) Kevin Olmedo	3–9
Altus Motorsports	Suzuki	33	(United States) Cooper McDonald	1–2
Altus Motorsports	Suzuki	59	(United States) Jaret Nassaney	All
McKnight Racing	Yamaha	17	(United States) Tony McKnight	9
West Side Performance Racing	Yamaha	18	(United States) Christian Miranda	1
Alvar Racing	Kawasaki	19	(United States) Ryan Alvar	6
North East Cycle Outlet Racing	Yamaha	20	(United States) CJ LaRoche	All
North East Cycle Outlet Racing	Yamaha	88	(United States) Benjamin Smith	All
Mi Scusi Racing	Yamaha	22	(United States) Thomas McQuigg	2
MESA37 Racing	Yamaha	24	(United States) Xavier Zayat	1–2, 9
MESA37 Racing	Kawasaki	37	(United States) Stefano Mesa	1–3, 5–9
BARTCON Racing	Kawasaki	25	(South Africa) Dominic Doyle	1, 3–9
BARTCON Racing	Kawasaki	62	(United States) Anthony Mazziotto	2
PH26 Racing	Yamaha	26	(United States) Phil Horwitz	3
EZ Racing	Yamaha	27	(Mexico) Edgar Zaragoza	All
CV28 Racing	Kawasaki	28	(United States) Cory Ventura	5
Innovative Motor Sports	Suzuki	34	(United States) Scott Briody	2
Team Schwags	Yamaha	38	(United States) Jonathan Schweiger	3, 9
Fisk Brothers Racing	Yamaha	39	(United States) Brian Hebeisen	6
M4 ECSTAR Suzuki	Suzuki	40	(United States) Sean Dylan Kelly	All
M4 ECSTAR Suzuki	Suzuki	44	(South Africa) Samuel Lochoff	All
Justin Jones Racing	Kawasaki	43	(United States) Justin Jones	8
Tango Racing	Yamaha	45	(Argentina) Matias Petratti	1–5, 7
All Hustle Racing	Yamaha	46	(United States) Nick Patenaude	7, 9
Duo Rotae Racing	Yamaha	47	(Netherlands) Harm Jansen	5
K and J Racing Solutions	Yamaha	48	(United States) Kevin Nolde	1
Catalyst Reaction Racing	Yamaha	50	(Poland) Patryk Buchcik	5
Cycle Gear Racing	Yamaha	52	(United States) Nolan Lamkin	1–5, 8
August Racing	Yamaha	53	(United States) August Nord	3, 9
GT Law Racing	Yamaha	55	(United States) Kyle Fox	1
Lane Racing	Yamaha	57	(United States) Jeff Lane	4
XS Racing	Kawasaki	58	(United States) Daniel Riser	5
Disrupt Racing	Yamaha	60	(United States) Carl Soltisz	All
Pure Attitude Racing	Kawasaki	61	(United States) Austin Miller	All
Pure Attitude Racing	Yamaha	99	(United States) Nate Minster	1–7, 9
Art Performance	Suzuki	63	(United States) Fernando Silva	9
Art Performance	Suzuki	65	(United States) Bruno Silva	9
PDR Motorsports	Yamaha	64	(United States) Max Angles	1–4
Nielsen Racing	Yamaha	67	(United States) Jes Schwartz	3
Surtimoto Team - Help Work Mexico	Yamaha	68	(Mexico) Daniel Cano Flores	1
SBKUNDG	Kawasaki	69	(United States) Chris Sarbora	4
S&R Racing	Kawasaki	70	(United States) Sean Cresap	4
SpeedDealer Racing	Yamaha	73	(United States) Philip Melnyk	4
Thermiotis Racing	Yamaha	78	(Venezuela) Alejandro Thermiotis	All
Topbox Road Racing	Suzuki	79	(United States) Mark Faulkner	1, 9
Sam Gluss Racing	Kawasaki	81	(United States) Samuel Gluss	5
Franklin Armory/Disrupt Racing	Kawasaki	85	(United States) Jessica Capizzi	3
3R Team Racing	Kawasaki	87	(Colombia) Rigo Salazar	7–9
Grant Motors Racing	Kawasaki	90	(United States) Liam Grant	All
GP Racing	Yamaha	93	(United States) Gabriel Da Silva	2, 4–5, 9
Mosites Motorsports	Kawasaki	95	(United States) Gary Yancoskie	7
Landers Racing/Tyrant CNC	Yamaha	97	(United States) Rocco Landers	1–8

== Championship standings ==
Scoring system

Points are awarded to the top fifteen finishers. A rider has to finish the race to earn points.

Position	1st	2nd	3rd	4th	5th	6th	7th	8th	9th	10th	11th	12th	13th	14th	15th
Points	25	20	16	13	11	10	9	8	7	6	5	4	3	2	1

Pos	Rider	Bike	RAT (Georgia (U.S. state))		VIR (Virginia)		RAM (Wisconsin)		RID (Washington (state))		MON (California)		BRA (Minnesota)		PIT (Pennsylvania)		NJE (New Jersey)		ALA (Alabama)		Pts
Pos	Rider	Bike	R1	R2	R1	R2	R1	R2	R1	R2	R1	R2	R1	R2	R1	R2	R1	R2	R1	R2	Pts
1	(United States) Sean Dylan Kelly	Suzuki	1	1	1	2	6	2	1	1	1	1	1	1	2	1	1	2	1	2	410
2	(Mexico) Richie Escalante	Kawasaki	2	2	4	1	5	1	2	2	2	2	2	Ret	1	2	2	3	2	DNS	315
3	(South Africa) Samuel Lochoff	Suzuki	5	7	8	5	2	4	4	4	7	26	3	3	5	4	3	1	4	3	233
4	(United States) Rocco Landers	Yamaha	DNS	3	5	4	4	7	5	6	6	5	Ret	2	3	3	4	4			182
5	(United States) Benjamin Smith	Yamaha	6	6	3	Ret	3	5	Ret	5	4	4	4	5	4	5	5	7	DNS	6	178
6	(United States) Stefano Mesa	Kawasaki	Ret	4	2	3	1	3			DNS	7	5	4	6	6	8	8	3	Ret	175
7	(El Salvador) Kevin Olmedo	Suzuki					7	6	3	3	5	6	Ret	Ret	13	9	6	6	DNS	12	106
8	(South Africa) Dominic Doyle	Kawasaki	DNS	DNS			10	11	6	7	Ret	9	Ret	6	7	7	9	9	6	8	97
9	(United States) Carl Soltisz	Yamaha	10	10	10	8	8	8	14	12	10	23	7	10	9	10	13	14	9	15	95
10	(United States) Jaret Nassaney	Suzuki	8	12	9	10	12	13	8	9	13	11	8	9	14	12	17	10	13	10	91
11	(Venezuela) Alejandro Thermiotis	Yamaha	7	9	Ret	Ret	11	12	10	10	8	13	9	13	8	Ret	10	13	Ret	4	88
12	(United States) Nolan Lamkin	Yamaha	3	Ret	Ret	19	9	Ret	7	11	Ret	8					7	5			65
13	(United States) Liam Grant	Kawasaki	DNS	Ret	Ret	9	Ret	Ret	12	13	11	12	6	8	11	8	16	Ret	5	Ret	65
14	(United States) Gabriel Da Silva	Yamaha			7	6			DNS	Ret	9	10							14	1	59
15	(United States) Nate Minster	Yamaha	DNS	8	12	DNS	13	10	9	14	15	15	Ret	7	10	13			Ret	Ret	50
16	(United States) CJ LaRoche	Yamaha	11	14	13	13	16	15	16	15	14	16	10	12	12	14	12	12	Ret	7	50
17	(United States) Austin Miller	Kawasaki	12	Ret	15	14	14	16	11	20	12	14	DNS	11	15	Ret	15	15	10	9	41
18	(United States) Max Angles	Kawasaki	4	Ret	11	Ret	18	9	13	8											36
19	(United States) Cory Ventura	Kawasaki									3	3									32
20	(United States) Bruno Silva	Suzuki																	8	5	19
21	(United States) Anthony Mazziotto	Kawasaki			6	7															19
22	(Mexico) Edgar Zaragoza	Yamaha	15	15	14	11	17	21	17	18	18	21	11	14	19	16	18	16	Ret	20	16
23	(United States) Mark Faulkner	Suzuki	13	18															12	11	12
24	(United States) Christian Miranda	Yamaha	9	11																	12
25	(United States) Xavier Zayat	Yamaha	DNS	5	DNS	DNS													DNS	Ret	11
26	(United States) Chuck Ivey	Yamaha	14	16	19	15													11	13	11
27	(United States) Nick Patenaude	Yamaha													20	18			7	14	11
28	(United States) Justin Jones	Kawasaki															11	11			10
29	(United States) Cooper McDonald	Suzuki	16	13	17	12															7
30	(Colombia) Rigo Salazar	Kawasaki													17	11	14	17	DNS	16	7
31	(United States) Tony Blackall	Yamaha	18	DNS	18	16	19	17	Ret	19	21	25	13	16			19	18	16	Ret	4
32	(United States) Brian Hebeisen	Yamaha											12	15							4
33	(Argentina) Matias Petratti	Yamaha	17	17	16	17	15	14	18	17	16	19			18	17					3
34	(United States) Gary Yancoskie	Kawasaki													16	15					1
35	(United States) Chris Sarbora	Kawasaki							15	16											1
36	(United States) August Nord	Yamaha					20	18											15	18	1
	(Poland) Patryk Buchcik	Yamaha									17	18									0
	(United States) Daniel Riser	Kawasaki									Ret	17									0
	(United States) Ryan Alvar	Kawasaki											Ret	17							0
	(United States) Fernando Silva	Suzuki																	Ret	17	0
	(United States) Thomas McQuigg	Yamaha			20	18															0
	(United States) Jonathan Schweiger	Yamaha					23	20											Ret	19	0
	(United States) Jessica Capizzi	Kawasaki					21	19													0
	(United States) Jeremiah Walker	MV Agusta									19	24									0
	(United States) Steven Campbell	Kawasaki							19	DNS											0
	(United States) Sean Cresap	Kawasaki							20	21											0
	(United States) Samuel Gluss	Kawasaki									20	22									0
	(Netherlands) Harm Jansen	Yamaha									Ret	20									0
	(United States) Tony McKnight	Yamaha																	DNS	21	0
	(United States) Jes Schwartz	Yamaha					22	Ret													0
	(United States) Jeff Lane	Yamaha							Ret	22											0
	(United States) Phil Horwitz	Yamaha					24	DNS													0
	(United States) Kevin Nolde	Yamaha	Ret	Ret																	0
	(United States) Scott Briody	Suzuki			Ret	DNS															0
	(United States) Philip Melnyk	Yamaha							Ret	DNS											0
	(Mexico) Daniel Cano Flores	Yamaha	DNS	DNS																	0
	(United States) Kyle Fox	Yamaha	DNS	DNS																	0
Pos	Rider	Bike	RAT (Georgia (U.S. state))		VIR (Virginia)		RAM (Wisconsin)		RID (Washington (state))		MON (California)		BRA (Minnesota)		PIT (Pennsylvania)		NJE (New Jersey)		ALA (Alabama)		Pts
