= 2020 MotoAmerica season =

American motorbike competition held in 2020

The 2020 MotoAmerica Championship (known as 2020 HONOS FIM MotoAmerica Championship for sponsorship reasons) was the 6th season of the MotoAmerica Championship.

== Classes ==
=== Superbike ===
MotoAmerica’s premier race class, HONOS Superbike showcases the top road racers aboard top-of-the-line, highly modified motorcycles capable of speeds approaching 200 miles per hour. Engine configurations and minimum weight requirements are listed below:

- Over 750cc up to 1000cc, 4-stroke, 3- and 4-cylinder
- Over 850cc up to 1200cc, 4-stroke, 2-cylinder
- 370.5 pounds
- Models: BMW S1000RR, Ducati Panigale V4 R, Honda CBR1000RR, Kawasaki Ninja ZX-10R, Suzuki GSX-R1000, Yamaha YZF-R1

=== Stock 1000 ===
A feeder class for Superbike, Stock 1000 gives MotoAmerica riders the opportunity to gain experience aboard 1,000cc motorcycles with an eye toward eventually moving up to Superbike. Engine configurations requirements are listed below:

- Over 750cc up to 1000cc, 4-stroke, 3- and 4-cylinder
- Over 850cc up to 1200cc, 4-stroke, 2-cylinder
- 374 pounds
- Models: BMW S1000RR, Honda CBR1000RR, Kawasaki Ninja ZX-10R, Suzuki GSX-R1000, Yamaha YZF-R1

=== Supersport ===
MotoAmerica’s middleweight race class, Supersport features the series’ rising stars competing aboard production-based motorcycles. Engine configurations and minimum weight requirements are listed below:

- Over 400cc up to 600cc, 4-stroke, 4-cylinder
- Over 500cc up to 675cc, 4-stroke, 3-cylinder
- Over 600cc up to 750cc, 4-stroke, 2-cylinder
- 354.2 pounds
- Models: Kawasaki Ninja ZX-6R, Suzuki GSX-R600, Yamaha YZF-R6

=== Twins ===
Putting middleweight, twin-cylinder motorcycles in the spotlight, Twins Cup enables regional and club racers from around the country to step up to the MotoAmerica series and compete on a national level. Engine configurations requirements are listed below:

- Over 600cc up to 800cc, 4-stroke, 2-cylinder
- Over 600cc up to 700cc: 297.6 pounds
- Over 700cc up to 800cc: 319.6 pounds
- Models: Kawasaki Ninja 650, Suzuki SV650, Yamaha FZ-07/MT-07

=== Junior Cup ===
MotoAmerica’s entry-level race class, Liqui Moly Junior Cup presents the series’ youngest riders competing aboard small-displacement, production-based motorcycles. Engine configurations requirements are listed below:

- Over 300cc up to 500cc, 4-stroke, 1- or 2-cylinder
- Models: Honda CBR500R, Kawasaki Ninja 400, Yamaha YZF-R3

== Race calendar and results ==
A provisional 9-event calendar was announced on 13 April 2020.

2020 Calendar									
Round		State	Circuit	Date	Superbike	Stock 1000	Supersport	Twins	Junior Cup
1	R1	Wisconsin	Road America	30 May	(United States) Cameron Beaubier	(United States) PJ Jacobsen	(Mexico) Richie Escalante	(United States) Kaleb De Keyrel	(South Africa) Dominic Doyle
1	R2	Wisconsin	Road America	31 may	(United States) Cameron Beaubier	No Race	(Mexico) Richie Escalante	No Race	(South Africa) Dominic Doyle
2	R1	Wisconsin	Road America	27 June	(United States) Cameron Beaubier	(South Africa) Cameron Petersen	(Mexico) Richie Escalante	(United States) Kaleb De Keyrel	(South Africa) Dominic Doyle
2	R2	Wisconsin	Road America	28 June	(United States) Bobby Fong	No Race	(Mexico) Richie Escalante	(United States) Rocco Landers	(United States) Rocco Landers
3	R1	(Georgia (U.S. state)) Georgia	Road Atlanta	1 August	(United States) Cameron Beaubier	(United States) Corey Alexander	(United States) Sean Dylan Kelly	(United States) Kaleb De Keyrel	(United States) Rocco Landers
3	R2	(Georgia (U.S. state)) Georgia	Road Atlanta	2 August	(United States) Cameron Beaubier	(United States) Corey Alexander	(Mexico) Richie Escalante	No Race	(United States) Rocco Landers
4	R1	Pennsylvania	Pittsburgh International Race Complex	8 August	(United States) Cameron Beaubier	(South Africa) Cameron Petersen	(Mexico) Richie Escalante	(United States) Rocco Landers	(United States) Rocco Landers
4	R2	Pennsylvania	Pittsburgh International Race Complex	9 August	(United States) Cameron Beaubier	(South Africa) Cameron Petersen	(Mexico) Richie Escalante	No Race	(United States) Rocco Landers
5	R1	(Washington (state)) Washington	The Ridge Motorsports Park	29 August	(United States) Cameron Beaubier	(South Africa) Cameron Petersen	(Mexico) Richie Escalante	(United States) Rocco Landers	(United States) Rocco Landers
5	R2	(Washington (state)) Washington	The Ridge Motorsports Park	30 August	(United States) Cameron Beaubier		(United States) Sean Dylan Kelly	No Race	(United States) Rocco Landers
6	R1	New Jersey	New Jersey Motorsports Park	12 September	(United States) Cameron Beaubier	(South Africa) Cameron Petersen	(Mexico) Richie Escalante	(United States) Rocco Landers	(United States) Rocco Landers
6	R2	New Jersey	New Jersey Motorsports Park	13 September	(United States) Cameron Beaubier		(United States) Sean Dylan Kelly	(United States) Rocco Landers	(United States) Rocco Landers
7	R1	Alabama	Barber Motorsports Park	19 September	(United States) Cameron Beaubier	(South Africa) Cameron Petersen	(Mexico) Richie Escalante	(United States) Rocco Landers	(United States) Rocco Landers
7	R2	Alabama	Barber Motorsports Park	20 September	(United States) Cameron Beaubier	(South Africa) Cameron Petersen	(Mexico) Richie Escalante	(United States) Rocco Landers	(United States) Rocco Landers
8	R1	Indiana	The Brickyard	10 October	(United States) Bobby Fong	(United States) Travis Wyman	(Mexico) Richie Escalante	(United States) Rocco Landers	(United States) Rocco Landers
8	R2	Indiana	The Brickyard	11 October	(Italy) Lorenzo Zanetti	No Race	(Mexico) Richie Escalante	No Race	(United States) Rocco Landers
8	R3	Indiana	The Brickyard	11 October	(United States) Bobby Fong	No Race	No Race	No Race	No Race
9	R1	California	WeatherTech Raceway Laguna Seca	24 October	(United States) Cameron Beaubier	(South Africa) Cameron Petersen	(United States) Sean Dylan Kelly	(United States) Rocco Landers	(United States) Rocco Landers
9	R2	California	WeatherTech Raceway Laguna Seca	25 October	(United States) Cameron Beaubier	No Race	(United States) Sean Dylan Kelly	No Race	(United States) Rocco Landers
9	R3	California	WeatherTech Raceway Laguna Seca	25 October	(United States) Cameron Beaubier	No Race	No Race	No Race	No Race

== Championship Standings ==
Points were awarded as follows:

Position	**1st**	**2nd**	**3rd**	**4th**	**5th**	**6th**	**7th**	**8th**	**9th**	**10th**	**11th**	**12th**	**13th**	**14th**	**15th**
Points	25	20	16	13	11	10	9	8	7	6	5	4	3	2	1

=== Superbike ===
Pos.	Rider	Bike	RAM (Wisconsin)				ATL (Georgia (U.S. state))		PIT (Pennsylvania)		TRD (Washington (state))		NJR (New Jersey)		BAR (Alabama)		INP (Indiana)			LGS (California)			Pts.
Pos.	Rider	Bike	R1	R2	R1	R2	R1	R2	R1	R2	R1	R2	R1	R2	R1	R2	R1	R2	R3	R1	R2	R3	Pts.
1	(United States) Cameron Beaubier	Yamaha	1	1	1	Ret	1	1	1	1	1	1	1	1	1	1	Ret	3	2	1	1	1	436
2	(United States) Jake Gagne	Yamaha	3	2	6	2	2	2	3	3	4	2	Ret	2	2	5	2	4	7	4	4	5	301
3	(United States) Bobby Fong	Suzuki	4	Ret	2	1	5	4	Ret	Ret	3	3	5	4	6	3	1	2	1	Ret	10	4	253
4	(Spain) Toni Elias	Suzuki	16	Ret	4	7	4	5	5	5	5	6	3	5	4	4	4	5	DNS	2	3	2	222
5	(South Africa) Mathew Scholtz	Yamaha	2	Ret	5	4	3	3	2	2	2	4	2	3	3	2	DNS	0	0	0	0	0	221
6	(United States) Josh Herrin	BMW	6	3	7	5	Ret	7	7	4	6	5	10	Ret	8	6	5	6	4	7	8	13	176
7	(United States) Kyle Wyman	Ducati	5	4	3	3	Ret	6	4	6	DNS	0	4	6	7	10	DNS	9	5	5	7	7	174
8	(South Africa) Cameron Petersen	Suzuki	15	7	10	8	16	9	13	8	9	7	7	7	5	Ret	DNS	7	6	8	5	8	133
9	(Italy) Lorenzo Zanetti	Ducati	0	0	0	0	0	0	0	0	7	Ret	0	0	0	0	3	1	3	3	2	3	118
10	(Australia) David Anthony	Suzuki	8	6	8	6	6	8	6	7	Ret	Ret	8	9	DNS	8	DNS	11	9	Ret	DNS	Ret	108
11	(United States) Travis Wyman	BMW	10	15	12	13	11	12	10	10	DNS	10	11	10	10	9	6	8	8	Ret	12	16	95
12	(United States) Corey Alexander	Kawasaki	12	8	Ret	9	DNS	10	DNS	12	Ret	DNS	6	8	DNS	7	10	12	11	10	13	10	86
13	(United Kingdom) Max Flinders	Yamaha	11	9	11	10	9	13	12	DNS	Ret	12	14	13	14	14	11	16	14	14	16	11	64
14	(Brazil) Danilo Lewis	BMW	13	11	15	14	10	DNS	0	0	14	Ret	12	12	15	16	9	10	Ret	13	11	12	53
15	(United Kingdom) Bradley Ward	Kawasaki	14	10	14	12	8	Ret	9	Ret	10	9	9	DNS	0	0	0	0	0	0	0	0	49
16	(United States) Michael Gilbert	Suzuki	0	0	0	0	0	0	0	0	0	0	0	0	0	0	7	13	10	11	9	9	37
17	(United States) Jeremy Coffey	BMW	16	13	0	15	14	15	14	DNS	13	11	13	11	13	Ret	15	15	15	16	Ret	DNS	31
18	(Italy) Niccolo Canepa	Yamaha	0	0	0	0	0	0	0	0	0	0	0	0	0	0	0	0	0	6	6	6	30
19	(United States) PJ Jacobsen	Ducati	7	5	9	0	0	0	0	0	0	0	0	0	0	0	0	0	0	0	0	0	27
20	(Canada) Alex Dumas	Suzuki	0	0	0	0	0	0	DNS	9	DNS	0	0	0	0	0	8	Ret	13	12	14	14	26
21	(United States) Jayson Uribe	Honda	0	0	0	0	0	0	0	0	8	8	0	0	0	0	0	0	0	9	DNS	Ret	23
22	(United States) Jake Lewis	BMW	9	Ret	0	0	0	0	8	11	0	0	0	0	0	0	0	0	0	0	0	0	20
23	(United States) Joseph Giannotto	Kawasaki	16	12	Ret	DNS	13	14	0	0	0	0	15	Ret	12	15	12	16	16	0	0	0	19
24	(United States) Ashton Yates	Honda	DNS	14	Ret	16	12	Ret	DNS	DNS	0	0	DNS	0	11	12	13	16	DNS	0	0	0	18
25	(United States) Stefano Mesa	Kawasaki	0	0	0	0	0	11	11	DNS	0	0	0	0	DNS	13	0	0	0	0	0	0	13
26	(United States) Sam Verderico	Yamaha	16	16	13	Ret	0	0	15	Ret	16	13	16	14	0	0	14	16	16	16	16	15	12
27	(United States) Andrew Lee	Kawasaki	0	0	0	0	0	0	0	0	0	0	0	0	9	11	Ret	Ret	16	0	0	0	12
28	(United States) Michael Gilbert	Suzuki	0	0	Ret	11	0	0	0	DNS	12	DNS	DNS	0	DNS	0	0	0	0	0	0	0	9
29	(United States) Geoff May	Kawasaki	0	0	0	0	7	DNS	0	0	0	0	0	0	0	0	0	0	0	0	0	0	9
30	(United States) Andy DiBrino	Kawasaki	0	0	0	0	0	0	0	0	11	DNS	0	0	0	0	0	0	0	15	15	DNS	7
31	(Uruguay) Maximiliano Gerardo	Kawasaki	0	0	0	0	0	0	0	0	0	0	0	0	0	0	DNS	14	12	0	0	0	6
32	(United States) Hunter Dunham	Yamaha	0	0	0	0	0	0	0	13	15	0	0	0	Ret	0	0	0	0	0	0	0	4
33	(United States) Jeffrey Purk	Yamaha	0	0	0	0	15	16	16	14	0	0	0	0	16	16	DNS	16	16	0	0	0	3
34	(United States) Brian Pinkstaff	Kawasaki	0	0	0	0	0	0	0	0	16	14	0	0	0	0	0	0	0	0	0	0	2
35	(United Kingdom) Steven Shakespeare	Yamaha	0	0	0	0	0	0	0	0	0	0	16	15	0	0	0	0	0	0	0	0	1
Pos.	Rider	Bike	RAM (Wisconsin)				ATL (Georgia (U.S. state))		PIT (Pennsylvania)		TRD (Washington (state))		NJR (New Jersey)		BAR (Alabama)		INP (Indiana)			LGS (California)			Pts.

Colour	Result
Gold	Winner
Silver	Second place
Bronze	Third place
Green	Points classification
Blue	Non-points classification
Blue	Non-classified finish (NC)
Purple	Retired, not classified (Ret)
Red	Did not qualify (DNQ)
Red	Did not pre-qualify (DNPQ)
Black	Disqualified (DSQ)
White	Did not start (DNS)
White	Withdrew (WD)
White	Race cancelled (C)
Blank	Did not practice (DNP)
Blank	Did not arrive (DNA)
Blank	Excluded (EX)

**Bold** – Pole position
Italics – Fastest lap

=== Stock 1000 ===
Pos.	Rider	Bike	RAM (Wisconsin)		ATL (Georgia (U.S. state))		PIT (Pennsylvania)		TRD (Washington (state))	NJR (New Jersey)	BAR (Alabama)		INP (Indiana)	LGS (California)	Pts.
Pos.	Rider	Bike	R1	R2	R1	R2	R1	R2	R1	R1	R1	R2	R1	R1	Pts.
1	(South Africa) Cameron Petersen	Suzuki	2	1	2	16	1	1	1	1	1	1	2	1	260
2	(United States) Corey Alexander	Kawasaki	3	6	1	1	3	2	3	2	3	2	Ret	2	204
3	(United States) Travis Wyman	BMW	6	5	7	5	7	3	4	4	5	6	1	6	148
4	(United States) Michael Gilbert	Kawasaki	5	3	6	Ret	4	6	2	3	4	3	0	0	125
5	(United States) Stefano Mesa	Kawasaki	4	2	5	4	5	5	0	0	2	4	5	0	123
6	(Canada) Alex Dumas	Suzuki	7	4	3	2	2	4	0	0	0	0	4	4	117
7	(United States) Ashton Yates	Honda	8	8	8	6	6	7	0	5	7	8	7	0	90
8	(Brazil) Danilo Lewis	BMW	9	7	9	DNS	0	0	5	6	9	7	6	3	86
9	(United States) Joseph Giannotto	Kawasaki	Ret	Ret	10	7	0	0	0	7	10	9	8	0	45
10	(United States) Hunter Dunham	Yamaha	10	10	11	Ret	8	8	DNS	0	8	0	0	0	41
11	(United States) Jeffrey Purk	Yamaha	Ret	11	14	12	12	11	0	0	13	11	10	11	39
12	(Uruguay) Maximiliano Gerardo	Kawasaki	0	0	0	0	0	0	0	0	6	5	3	0	37
13	(United States) Corey Heflin	Yamaha	0	0	13	9	11	10	0	9	14	12	16	0	34
14	(United States) Christian Crosslin	Kawasaki	0	0	12	8	9	9	0	0	11	0	0	0	31
15	(United States) Geoff May	Kawasaki	0	0	4	3	0	0	0	0	0	0	0	0	29
16	(United States) Jeremy Simmons	Yamaha	12	12	16	11	13	15	0	10	15	13	16	15	28
17	(United States) PJ Jacobsen	Ducati	1	0	DNS	0	0	0	0	0	0	0	0	0	25
18	(United Kingdom) Steven Shakespeare	Yamaha	13	15	0	0	14	12	0	11	0	0	16	12	19
19	(United States) Manuel Segura	Kawasaki	0	0	15	13	10	13	0	0	0	0	0	0	13
20	(United States) Tony Storniolo	Kawasaki	11	9	0	0	0	0	0	0	0	0	0	0	12
21	(United States) Andy DiBrino	Kawasaki	0	0	0	0	0	0	Ret	0	0	0	0	5	11
22	(United States) Adam Robarts	Suzuki	0	0	0	0	0	0	6	0	0	0	0	0	10
23	(Mexico) Edgar Zaragoza	Yamaha	0	13	DNS	DNS	0	0	0	0	0	0	0	9	10
24	(United States) Alan Phillips	Kawasaki	0	0	0	0	0	0	0	0	12	10	0	0	10
25	(United States) George Myshlyayev	Kawasaki	0	0	0	0	0	0	0	0	0	0	0	7	9
26	(United States) Ned Brown	Yamaha	0	0	16	10	DNS	Ret	0	0	0	0	13	0	9
27	(United States) Cody Cochran	BMW	0	0	0	0	0	0	7	0	0	0	0	16	9
28	(Brazil) Sebastiao Ferreira	Suzuki	0	0	0	0	0	0	0	0	0	0	0	8	8
29	(United States) Steve Zoumaras	Kawasaki	0	0	0	0	0	0	8	0	0	0	0	0	8
30	(United States) Jeremy Cook	BMW	0	0	0	0	0	0	0	8	0	0	16	0	8
31	(United States) Aaron Risinger	BMW	0	0	0	0	0	0	0	0	0	0	9	0	7
32	(United States) Kevin Nanthrup	BMW	0	0	0	0	0	0	9	0	0	0	0	0	7
33	(United States) Michael Butler	Yamaha	15	14	16	15	0	0	0	0	16	15	14	0	7
34	(Israel) Sahar Zvik	Kawasaki	0	0	0	0	0	0	0	0	0	0	0	10	6
35	(United States) Sean Cresap	Suzuki	0	0	0	0	0	0	10	0	0	0	0	0	6
36	(United States) Walt Sipp	Yamaha	0	16	16	16	0	0	0	0	Ret	0	11	0	5
37	(Germany) Stefan Dolipski	BMW	14	16	16	16	15	14	0	0	Ret	0	16	0	5
38	(United States) Josh Gerardot	Kawasaki	16	0	16	Ret	16	16	0	12	16	16	16	Ret	4
39	(United States) John Dunham	Yamaha	0	0	16	14	0	0	0	0	16	14	0	0	4
40	(Mexico) Ivan Munoz	Kawasaki	0	0	0	0	0	0	0	0	0	0	12	16	4
41	(United States) Wes Farnsworth	Kawasaki	0	0	0	0	0	0	0	0	0	0	0	13	3
Pos.	Rider	Bike	RAM (Wisconsin)		ATL (Georgia (U.S. state))		PIT (Pennsylvania)		TRD (Washington (state))	NJR (New Jersey)	BAR (Alabama)		INP (Indiana)	LGS (California)	Pts.

Colour	Result
Gold	Winner
Silver	Second place
Bronze	Third place
Green	Points classification
Blue	Non-points classification
Blue	Non-classified finish (NC)
Purple	Retired, not classified (Ret)
Red	Did not qualify (DNQ)
Red	Did not pre-qualify (DNPQ)
Black	Disqualified (DSQ)
White	Did not start (DNS)
White	Withdrew (WD)
White	Race cancelled (C)
Blank	Did not practice (DNP)
Blank	Did not arrive (DNA)
Blank	Excluded (EX)

**Bold** – Pole position
Italics – Fastest lap

=== Supersport ===
Pos.	Rider	Bike	RAM (Wisconsin)				ATL (Georgia (U.S. state))		PIT (Pennsylvania)		TRD (Washington (state))		NJR (New Jersey)		BAR (Alabama)		INP (Indiana)		LGS (California)		Pts.
Pos.	Rider	Bike	R1	R2	R1	R2	R1	R2	R1	R2	R1	R2	R1	R2	R1	R2	R1	R2	R1	R2	Pts.
1	(Mexico) Richie Escalante	Kawasaki	1	1	1	1	2	1	1	1	1	Ret	1	3	1	1	1	1	Ret	2	381
2	(United States) Sean Dylan Kelly	Suzuki	Ret	2	2	2	1	2	2	2	2	1	3	1	2	2	16	2	1	1	341
3	(United States) Brandon Paasch	Kawasaki	2	DSQ	3	3	3	3	3	3	3	Ret	2	2	4	3	3	4	2	6	260
4	(United States) Jason Aguilar	Yamaha	Ret	3	4	4	5	4	4	4	7	3	9	8	3	4	6	Ret	4	8	192
5	(Brazil) Lucas Silva	Suzuki	8	5	7	8	6	6	6	7	6	2	7	7	10	8	4	6	6	13	173
6	(El Salvador) Kevin Olmedo	Suzuki	3	10	DNS	0	4	5	5	5	4	Ret	5	5	5	5	8	7	Ret	9	149
7	(United States) Nate Minster	Yamaha	4	4	6	5	10	8	8	8	8	Ret	8	10	7	6	7	9	7	11	148
8	(United States) Xavier Zayat	Yamaha	6	7	10	9	DNS	0	7	6	5	4	4	4	8	Ret	5	5	9	12	142
9	(United States) Benjamin Smith	Yamaha	5	12	5	7	7	7	Ret	Ret	0	0	6	6	6	10	9	8	Ret	4	117
10	(United States) Nolan Lamkin	Yamaha	10	6	8	6	DNS	9	Ret	10	11	5	11	11	9	7	11	Ret	8	15	103
11	(United States) Jaret Nassaney	Suzuki	9	9	11	15	9	11	Ret	Ret	9	12	10	9	Ret	11	12	11	10	14	78
12	(Venezuela) Alejandro Thermiotis	Yamaha	11	14	Ret	Ret	11	12	10	Ret	10	6	12	12	11	9	13	Ret	13	16	64
13	(Mexico) Edgar Zaragoza	Yamaha	13	15	14	12	14	13	13	11	15	8	15	13	15	15	14	16	12	16	44
14	(United States) Stefano Mesa	Kawasaki	0	0	0	0	0	0	0	0	0	0	0	0	0	0	2	3	0	0	36
15	(United States) Carl Soltisz	Yamaha	7	8	9	10	0	0	0	0	0	0	0	0	0	0	Ret	12	0	0	34
16	(United States) Cory Ventura	Kawasaki	0	0	0	0	0	0	0	0	0	0	0	0	0	0	0	0	3	5	27
17	(United States) Max Angles Fernandez	Yamaha	0	0	Ret	11	8	10	9	0	0	0	0	0	0	0	0	0	0	0	26
18	(United States) Bryce Prince	Yamaha	0	0	0	0	0	0	0	0	0	0	0	0	0	0	0	0	5	7	20
19	(United States) Kinzer Naylor	Kawasaki	0	0	12	13	0	0	0	0	14	7	0	0	0	0	0	0	0	0	18
20	(United States) J. D. Beach	Yamaha	0	0	0	0	0	0	0	0	0	0	0	0	0	0	0	0	Ret	3	16
21	(United States) Tony Blackall	Yamaha	15	Ret	13	16	0	0	16	15	16	11	13	15	16	16	15	15	16	16	16
22	(United States) CJ LaRoche	Yamaha	0	0	0	0	0	0	11	9	0	0	0	0	0	0	16	14	Ret	16	14
23	(United States) Patrick Coleman	Kawasaki	12	11	Ret	16	0	0	Ret	Ret	0	0	0	0	0	0	16	13	15	Ret	13
24	(United States) Hayden Schultz	Kawasaki	0	0	0	0	0	0	0	0	0	0	0	0	0	0	10	10	0	0	12
25	(United States) Austin Miller	Kawasaki	0	0	0	0	12	15	15	14	0	0	0	0	12	16	0	0	0	0	12
26	(United States) Andrew Lee	Kawasaki	0	0	0	0	0	0	0	0	0	0	0	0	0	0	0	0	11	10	11
27	(United States) Dustin Walbon	Kawasaki	0	0	0	0	0	0	0	0	13	9	0	0	0	0	0	0	0	0	10
28	(United States) Chris Sarbora	Yamaha	0	0	0	0	0	0	0	0	12	10	0	0	0	0	0	0	16	16	10
29	(United States) Chuck Ivey	Yamaha	0	0	0	0	13	14	0	0	0	0	0	0	16	13	16	16	0	0	8
30	(Mexico) Aldo Rovirosa	Yamaha	0	0	0	0	0	0	0	0	0	0	0	0	13	12	0	0	0	0	7
31	(United States) Gary Yancoskie	Kawasaki	0	0	0	0	0	0	12	13	0	0	0	0	0	0	0	0	0	0	7
32	(Mexico) Jorge Ehrenstein	Yamaha	14	13	Ret	14	0	0	0	0	0	0	0	0	0	0	0	0	0	0	7
33	(United States) Tyler Wasserbauer	Yamaha	0	0	0	0	0	0	14	12	0	0	0	0	0	0	0	0	0	0	6
34	(United States) Scott Briody	Suzuki	0	0	0	0	0	0	0	0	0	0	14	14	0	0	Ret	16	0	0	4
35	(United States) Mark Faulkner	Suzuki	0	0	0	0	0	0	0	0	0	0	0	0	14	Ret	0	0	0	0	2
36	(Argentina) Roberto Hernan Medina	Yamaha	0	0	0	0	0	0	0	0	0	0	0	0	16	14	0	0	0	0	2
37	(United States) Kevin Murphy	Kawasaki	0	0	0	0	0	0	0	0	0	0	0	0	0	0	0	0	14	16	2
Pos.	Rider	Bike	RAM (Wisconsin)				ATL (Georgia (U.S. state))		PIT (Pennsylvania)		TRD (Washington (state))		NJR (New Jersey)		BAR (Alabama)		INP (Indiana)		LGS (California)		Pts.

Colour	Result
Gold	Winner
Silver	Second place
Bronze	Third place
Green	Points classification
Blue	Non-points classification
Blue	Non-classified finish (NC)
Purple	Retired, not classified (Ret)
Red	Did not qualify (DNQ)
Red	Did not pre-qualify (DNPQ)
Black	Disqualified (DSQ)
White	Did not start (DNS)
White	Withdrew (WD)
White	Race cancelled (C)
Blank	Did not practice (DNP)
Blank	Did not arrive (DNA)
Blank	Excluded (EX)

**Bold** – Pole position
Italics – Fastest lap

=== Twins ===
Pos.	Rider	Bike	RAM (Wisconsin)			ATL (Georgia (U.S. state))	PIT (Pennsylvania)	TRD (Washington (state))	NJR (New Jersey)		BAR (Alabama)		INP (Indiana)	LGS (California)	Pts.
Pos.	Rider	Bike	R1	R2	R3	R1	R1	R1	R1	R2	R1	R2	R1	R1	Pts.
1	(United States) Rocco Landers	Suzuki	2	3	1	3	1	1	1	1	1	1	1	1	277
2	(United States) Kaleb De Keyrel	Yamaha	1	1	2	1	2	2	6	4	Ret	2	3	3	210
3	(United States) Hayden Schultz	Yamaha	11	11	3	2	3	0	3	2	2	3	2	0	154
4	(United States) Jackson Blackmon	Suzuki	5	2	Ret	4	6	4	Ret	6	3	7	9	5	120
5	(United States) Toby Khamsouk	Suzuki	7	6	6	5	4	5	5	5	5	4	Ret	7	119
6	(United States) Cooper McDonald	Yamaha	6	7	5	11	9	6	9	9	6	6	Ret	4	99
7	(United States) Jason Madama	Yamaha	3	4	7	8	8	3	DNS	0	0	0	6	0	80
8	(United States) Trevor Standish	Suzuki	Ret	10	8	10	10	7	7	8	7	Ret	7	6	80
9	(United States) Teagg Hobbs	Suzuki	DNS	0	4	6	11	0	2	7	0	0	5	0	68
10	(United States) Dominic Doyle	Suzuki	0	0	0	0	0	0	4	3	0	0	4	2	62
11	(United States) Sam Wiest	Suzuki	12	13	11	0	14	8	8	10	12	11	13	9	55
12	(United States) Joseph Blasius	Suzuki	0	0	0	7	5	0	0	0	4	5	8	0	52
13	(United States) Chris Parrish	Suzuki	4	5	9	Ret	0	0	0	0	8	8	11	0	52
14	(United States) Kris Lillegard	Yamaha	9	9	10	0	7	0	0	0	9	10	10	0	48
15	(United States) Ryan Max Johnson	Yamaha	0	0	0	0	0	0	10	11	10	9	0	0	24
16	(United States) Daniel Adams	Suzuki	8	8	0	0	0	0	0	0	11	14	DNS	0	23
17	(United States) Ryne Snooks	Suzuki	13	Ret	15	16	15	9	11	12	16	Ret	0	0	21
18	(United States) Carl Price	Suzuki	16	16	12	13	16	DNS	0	0	16	16	16	12	11
19	(United States) Austin Miller	Suzuki	10	12	0	0	0	0	0	0	0	0	0	0	10
20	(United States) Tyler Freeman	Suzuki	0	0	0	12	0	0	0	0	14	13	0	0	9
21	(Canada) Darren James	Yamaha	0	0	0	0	0	0	0	0	0	0	0	8	8
22	(United States) Chris Bays	Suzuki	0	0	0	Ret	13	0	0	0	15	Ret	12	0	8
23	(United States) Dante Witter	Yamaha	0	0	0	9	0	0	0	0	0	0	0	0	7
24	(United States) Jared Trees	Suzuki	0	0	0	0	0	0	0	0	13	12	0	0	7
25	(United States) Alex Taylor	Yamaha	0	0	0	0	0	10	0	0	0	0	0	DNS	6
26	(United States) Justin Filice	Kawasaki	0	0	0	16	16	0	0	0	0	0	0	10	6
27	(United States) Paul Hopkins	Suzuki	0	0	DNS	0	16	0	13	13	0	0	0	0	6
28	(United States) Dustin Walbon	Suzuki	0	0	0	0	0	Ret	0	0	0	0	0	11	5
29	(United States) Steven Smith	Suzuki	16	16	13	14	0	0	0	0	0	0	0	0	5
30	(United States) Cliff Ramsdell	Suzuki	0	0	16	16	16	11	0	0	16	16	16	16	5
31	(United States) Rodney Vest	Suzuki	Ret	16	0	15	16	0	14	15	16	16	DNS	0	4
32	(United States) Robert Cichielo Jr.	Suzuki	16	16	0	0	0	0	12	Ret	0	0	0	0	4
33	(United States) Jerry Reeves	Suzuki	0	0	0	0	12	0	0	0	0	0	16	0	4
34	(United States) Aaron Tulchinsky	Yamaha	0	0	0	0	0	0	0	0	0	0	0	13	3
35	(United States) Corey Hart	Suzuki	0	0	0	0	0	0	Ret	14	16	15	16	0	3
36	(United States) Anthony Marcinek	Yamaha	15	16	14	0	16	0	0	0	0	0	0	0	3
37	(United States) Shawn Hill	Yamaha	14	15	16	0	Ret	0	0	0	0	0	16	0	3
38	(United States) Michael Kim	Suzuki	0	0	0	0	0	0	0	0	0	0	0	14	2
39	(United States) Brett Donahue	Yamaha	0	0	0	0	0	0	0	0	0	0	14	0	2
40	(United States) Shawn Adams	Suzuki	DNS	14	0	0	0	0	0	0	16	16	16	0	2
41	(United States) Matthew Riedlinger	Suzuki	0	0	0	0	0	Ret	0	0	0	0	0	15	1
Pos.	Rider	Bike	RAM (Wisconsin)			ATL (Georgia (U.S. state))	PIT (Pennsylvania)	TRD (Washington (state))	NJR (New Jersey)		BAR (Alabama)		INP (Indiana)	LGS (California)	Pts.

Colour	Result
Gold	Winner
Silver	Second place
Bronze	Third place
Green	Points classification
Blue	Non-points classification
Blue	Non-classified finish (NC)
Purple	Retired, not classified (Ret)
Red	Did not qualify (DNQ)
Red	Did not pre-qualify (DNPQ)
Black	Disqualified (DSQ)
White	Did not start (DNS)
White	Withdrew (WD)
White	Race cancelled (C)
Blank	Did not practice (DNP)
Blank	Did not arrive (DNA)
Blank	Excluded (EX)

**Bold** – Pole position
Italics – Fastest lap

=== Junior Cup ===
Pos.	Rider	Bike	RAM (Wisconsin)				ATL (Georgia (U.S. state))		PIT (Pennsylvania)		TRD (Washington (state))		NJR (New Jersey)		BAR (Alabama)		INP (Indiana)		LGS (California)		Pts.
Pos.	Rider	Bike	R1	R2	R1	R2	R1	R2	R1	R2	R1	R2	R1	R2	R1	R2	R1	R2	R1	R2	Pts.
1	(United States) Rocco Landers	Kawasaki	2	2	2	1	1	1	1	1	1	1	1	1	1	1	1	1	1	1	435
2	(South Africa) Dominic Doyle	Kawasaki	1	1	1	2	3	2	DNS	2	3	2	9	Ret	13	2	2	2	2	2	297
3	(South Africa) Samuel Lochoff	Kawasaki	3	5	5	3	2	3	2	3	2	3	2	4	2	5	4	3	3	3	287
4	(United States) Benjamin Gloddy	Kawasaki	5	3	3	4	4	4	3	5	4	5	3	3	3	3	3	12	5	Ret	228
5	(United States) Liam Grant	Kawasaki	6	6	8	8	7	9	9	9	5	13	8	7	6	4	7	9	4	4	162
6	(United States) David Kohlstaedt	Kawasaki	9	8	6	10	11	6	7	4	6	4	5	DNS	5	9	DNS	5	7	8	148
7	(United Kingdom) Jack Roach	Kawasaki	0	0	11	7	5	7	0	10	7	7	6	5	4	7	9	6	8	7	135
8	(United States) Cody Wyman	Yamaha	7	4	7	9	8	11	6	6	0	0	10	8	8	Ret	5	7	6	6	133
9	(United States) Blake Davis	Kawasaki	0	0	0	0	9	8	14	8	8	6	7	6	7	6	11	14	9	9	102
10	(United States) Joseph LiMandri Jr	Kawasaki	0	0	9	6	10	10	5	7	0	0	4	2	0	0	6	10	0	0	98
11	(United States) Gus Rodio	Kawasaki	4	7	4	5	6	5	4	Ret	9	0	0	0	0	0	0	0	0	0	87
12	(United States) Aden Thao	Kawasaki	13	13	15	12	13	12	10	16	10	9	12	10	DNS	12	10	13	11	Ret	65
13	(United States) John Knowles	Kawasaki	8	11	12	11	DSQ	15	11	DSQ	11	10	14	13	11	13	13	16	13	12	62
14	(United States) Isaiah Burleson	Kawasaki	15	9	10	15	DSQ	DSQ	Ret	Ret	0	0	0	0	9	10	15	4	0	0	42
15	(United States) Errol Sullivan	Kawasaki	12	10	Ret	16	DSQ	14	Ret	13	Ret	8	0	0	0	0	0	0	10	11	34
16	(United States) Daniel Kinard	Kawasaki	11	12	13	Ret	DSQ	16	13	15	Ret	11	13	12	DNS	0	0	0	15	13	32
17	(United States) Max VanDenBrouck	Kawasaki	0	0	0	0	0	0	0	0	0	0	0	0	10	11	12	Ret	12	10	25
18	(United States) Alexis Olivera	Kawasaki	10	14	Ret	Ret	12	13	DNS	14	13	0	0	0	0	0	0	0	0	0	20
19	(Argentina) Maximiliano Rocha	Kawasaki	0	0	0	0	0	0	0	0	0	0	0	0	DSQ	8	16	8	0	0	16
20	(United States) Eli Block	Kawasaki	0	0	0	0	0	0	12	16	0	0	11	9	0	0	0	0	0	0	16
21	(Mexico) Daniel Cano Flores	Kawasaki	0	0	Ret	Ret	0	0	8	11	0	0	0	0	DSQ	Ret	0	0	0	0	13
22	(United States) Jay Newton	Kawasaki	0	0	0	0	0	0	0	0	0	0	0	0	0	0	8	11	0	0	13
23	(United States) Brady Fors	Kawasaki	16	15	14	13	0	0	0	0	0	0	0	0	12	14	DNS	0	0	0	12
24	(United States) Tristan King	Kawasaki	0	0	Ret	14	0	0	Ret	12	0	0	Ret	11	0	0	Ret	15	0	0	12
25	(United States) Maxwell Toth	Kawasaki	0	0	0	0	0	0	0	0	0	0	0	0	0	0	0	0	Ret	5	11
26	(United States) Ryan Cresap	Kawasaki	0	0	0	0	0	0	0	0	12	12	0	0	0	0	0	0	0	0	8
27	(United States) Alex Ricci	Kawasaki	0	0	0	0	0	0	0	0	0	0	0	0	0	0	14	16	16	14	4
28	(United States) Ethan Cook	Yamaha	0	0	0	0	0	0	0	0	0	0	0	0	0	0	0	0	14	DNS	2
29	(United States) Cameron Jones	Honda	14	DNS	DNS	0	DSQ	0	0	0	0	0	0	0	0	0	0	0	0	0	2
30	(United States) Jake Vandal	Kawasaki	0	0	0	0	0	0	0	0	0	0	0	0	DSQ	DSQ	0	0	0	0	0
Pos.	Rider	Bike	RAM (Wisconsin)				ATL (Georgia (U.S. state))		PIT (Pennsylvania)		TRD (Washington (state))		NJR (New Jersey)		BAR (Alabama)		INP (Indiana)		LGS (California)		Pts.

Colour	Result
Gold	Winner
Silver	Second place
Bronze	Third place
Green	Points classification
Blue	Non-points classification
Blue	Non-classified finish (NC)
Purple	Retired, not classified (Ret)
Red	Did not qualify (DNQ)
Red	Did not pre-qualify (DNPQ)
Black	Disqualified (DSQ)
White	Did not start (DNS)
White	Withdrew (WD)
White	Race cancelled (C)
Blank	Did not practice (DNP)
Blank	Did not arrive (DNA)
Blank	Excluded (EX)

**Bold** – Pole position
Italics – Fastest lap
