= 2021 MotoAmerica Twins Championship =

The 2021 MotoAmerica Twins Championship season was the 4th season of the Twins Cup class in MotoAmerica competition.

== Calendar and results ==
Round	Circuit	Date	Race 1 Winner	Race 2 Winner
1	(Georgia (U.S. state)) Michelin Raceway Road Atlanta	April 30–May 2	(United States) Kaleb De Keyrel	(United States) Teagg Hobbs
2	Virginia International Raceway	May 21–23	(United States) Teagg Hobbs	(United States) Jody Barry
3	(Wisconsin) Road America	June 11–13	(United States) Kaleb De Keyrel	(No event)
4	(Washington (state)) The Ridge Motorsports Park	June 25–27	(United States) Jackson Blackmon	(United States) Jackson Blackmon
5	(California) WeatherTech Raceway Laguna Seca	July 9–11	(United States) Kaleb De Keyrel	(No event)
6	(Minnesota) Brainerd International Raceway	July 30–August 1	(United States) Kaleb De Keyrel	(United States) Anthony Mazziotto
7	(Pennsylvania) Pittsburgh International Race Complex	August 13–15	(United States) Anthony Mazziotto	(No event)
8	New Jersey Motorsports Park	September 10–12	(United States) Cory Ventura	(No event)
9	(Alabama) Barber Motorsports Park	September 17–19	(United States) Kaleb De Keyrel	(No event)

== Teams and riders ==
2021 Entry List
Team	Constructor	No.	Rider	Rounds
419 Racing	Suzuki	728	(United States) Jerry Reeves	7
626 Pack	Suzuki	626	(United States) Brian Mullins	3, 7, 9
Adopt A Pet	Suzuki	377	(United States) Dustin Walbon	1, 2, 3
BARTCON Racing	Aprilia	516	(United States) Anthony Mazziotto	4–8
BARTCON Racing	Yamaha	270	(United States) Ryne Snooks	1–6, 8, 9
Bays Racing	Suzuki	621	(United States) Chris Bays	1, 2, 9
Blue Line Racing	Suzuki	416	(United States) Daniel Mataczynski	6
Calishine Racing	Suzuki	204	(United States) Adam Faussett	1, 3–9
CarbonSmith	Aprilia	934	(United States) Ryan Smith	9
Catalyst Reaction Racing	Suzuki	147	(Poland) Patryk Buchcik	5
Catalyst Reaction Suspension/Rattler's Rock	Suzuki	215	(United States) Michael Kim	5
Champ Racing	Suzuki	98	(United States) Jonathan Champ	6
Chiefs Racing Team	Suzuki	676	(United States) Cassidy Heiser	7
Chiefs Racing Team	Suzuki	996	(United States) Greg Reisinger	2, 7, 9
F'Cancer Racing	Suzuki	959	(United States) Trevor Cece	6, 7
Feel Like A Pro/RiderzLaw Racing	Yamaha	111	(United States) Ryan Peterson	5
First XV Racing	Suzuki	75	(United States) Cliff Ramsdell	1–5
Fisk Brothers Racing	Yamaha	112	(United States) Brian Rogers	3, 6
GCP	Suzuki	128	(United States) Chris Parrish	1–7, 9
GDR Racing	Suzuki	230	(United States) Andrew Gold	2
Hart Luck Racing	Suzuki	136	(United States) Corey Hart	1, 2, 4, 5, 9
Hayden Schultz Racing	Yamaha	49	(United States) Hayden Schultz	All
HeyNow CW Moto Racing	Suzuki	787	(United States) Michael Henao	All
HONOS Racing Team	Yamaha	71	(Mexico) Jorge Ehrenstein	5
Innovative Motorsports/Mike's Imports	Suzuki	79	(United States) Teagg Hobbs	All
Jackson Blackmon Racing	Yamaha	18	(United States) Jackson Blackmon	2–9
JoeyO Racing	Yamaha	150	(United States) Robert Bettencourt	1, 7, 8, 9
KingsKamp.com Racing	Yamaha	23	(United States) Gino Angella	1, 2, 3, 5
Kruzn1 Racing	Suzuki	898	(United States) Andrew Kruse	3, 6
Limitless Racing	Suzuki	200	(United States) Joe Melendez	1, 2, 5, 9
LWT Racer	Aprilia	60	(United States) Sam Wiest	2–4, 7, 8
Martin Racing	Yamaha	262	(United States) Michael Martin	9
MRP Motorsports	Aprilia	173	(United States) Brad Faas	8
Pure Attitude Racing	Suzuki	16	(United States) Trevor Standish	1–3, 7–9
Pure Attitude Racing	Suzuki	37	(New Zealand) Liam MacDonald	All
Redleg Racing	Suzuki	224	(United States) Zach Thomas	9
Reed 323 Racing	Suzuki	323	(United States) Eric Reed	9
Righteous Racing	Aprilia	717	(United States) Jody Barry	1, 2, 4–9
Riot Racing	Aprilia	190	(United States) Christopher Evans	1
Robem Engineering	Aprilia	27	(United States) Toby Khamsouk	1, 2, 4–7
Robem Engineering	Aprilia	51	(United States) Kaleb De Keyrel	All
Robem Engineering	Aprilia	58	(United States) Maxwell Toth	7–9
Robem Engineering	Aprilia	70	(Italy) Tommaso Marcon	8, 9
Robem Engineering /Plastic Surgery Racing	Aprilia	532	(United States) Carl Price	7, 9
Ruthless Racing Inc	Yamaha	229	(Canada) Darren James	3, 5–9
Sizzle Maniac Racing	Suzuki	124	(United States) Heather Trees	1, 3, 7
SP8S Racing	Kawasaki	138	(United States) Chris Speights	2, 8
Tarmac Faction	Yamaha	158	(United States) Paul Geldziler	5
Team Biothermal	Aprilia	227	(Puerto Rico) Edwin Cosme	1–3, 6–9
Team Legacy Racing	Kawasaki	17	(United States) Justin Filice	5
Ten Racing	Yamaha	10	(United States) Brett Donahue	3, 6
Trees Racing	Suzuki	154	(United States) Jared Trees	2, 9
Unit F14/Bison	Suzuki	545	(United States) Chandler Slagle	9
Veloce Racing	Aprilia	28	(United States) Cory Ventura	8, 9
Veloce Racing	Aprilia	58	(United States) Maxwell Toth	7–9
Veloce Racing	Aprilia	62	(United States) Anthony Mazziotto	4–8
Veloce Racing	Yamaha	291	(United States) Alex Taylor	4, 5
Vestment Realty	Yamaha	310	(United States) Rodney Vest	All
VSV Racing	Yamaha	192	(United States) Valentine Welch	4, 5
Wicked Flower/RiderzLaw Racing	Suzuki	52	(United States) John Knowles	All
Wrench Motorcycles	Yamaha	143	(United States) Jordan Edginton	5, 6
Wrench Motorcycles	Yamaha	219	(United States) Ethan Cook	1–4, 7–9
KK47 Racing	Yamaha	473	(United States) Kris Lillegard	9

== Championship standings ==
Scoring system

Points are awarded to the top fifteen finishers. A rider has to finish the race to earn points.

Position	1st	2nd	3rd	4th	5th	6th	7th	8th	9th	10th	11th	12th	13th	14th	15th
Points	25	20	16	13	11	10	9	8	7	6	5	4	3	2	1

Pos	Rider	Bike	RAT (Georgia (U.S. state))		VIR (Virginia)		RAM (Wisconsin)	RID (Washington (state))		MON (California)	BRA (Minnesota)		PIT (Pennsylvania)	NJE (New Jersey)		ALA (Alabama)	Pts
Pos	Rider	Bike	R1	R2	R1	R2	R1	R1	R2	R1	R1	R2	R1	R1	R2	R1	Pts
1	(United States) Kaleb De Keyrel	Aprilia	1		5	3	1	2	3	1	1	2	10	2	Ret	1	234
2	(United States) Hayden Schultz	Yamaha	3	DNS	4	6	4	5	4	7	4	4	2	7	6	3	166
3	(United States) Jackson Blackmon	Yamaha			2	2	2	1	1	4	Ret	Ret	4	5	5	22	158
4	(United States) Teagg Hobbs	Suzuki	DSQ	1	1	4	Ret	3	5	8	3	3	DSQ	6	7	9	156
5	(United States) Anthony Mazziotto	Aprilia						Ret	2	2	2	1	1	Ret	2		130
6	(United States) Jody Barry	Aprilia	2	DNS	8	1		Ret	6	3	Ret	DNS	3	4	Ret	2	128
7	(United States) Chris Parrish	Suzuki	6	3	3	7	3	Ret	8	6	5	5	5			28	118
8	(United States) Toby Khamsouk	Aprilia	5	DNS	7	8		4	7	5	6	6	8				89
9	(United States) John Knowles	Suzuki	9	9	18	16	9	6	9	13	7	8	12	9	9	19	76
10	(United States) Trevor Standish	Suzuki	4	2	6	5	Ret						23	8	8	Ret	70
11	(New Zealand) Liam MacDonald	Suzuki	10	7	10	9	5	Ret	10	9	Ret	7	9	Ret	Ret	Ret	68
12	(United States) Ryne Snooks	Yamaha	8	6	15	12	8	Ret	16	12	DNS			10	10	8	55
13	(United States) Maxwell Toth	Aprilia											6	3	3	14	44
14	(Canada) Darren James	Yamaha					12			10	Ret	9	11	12	11	4	44
15	(United States) Ethan Cook	Yamaha	DNS	8	9	10	6	Ret	Ret				DNS	Ret	Ret	5	42
16	(United States) Cory Ventura	Aprilia												1	4	Ret	38
17	(United States) Michael Henao	Suzuki	17		20	17	15	9	13	19	9	11	15	11	12	15	34
18	(United States) Chris Bays	Suzuki	11	4	13	Ret										6	31
19	(United States) Adam Faussett	Suzuki	DNS	13			16	7	12	17	8	Ret	19	14	14	18	28
20	(United States) Corey Hart	Suzuki	7	5	17	DNS		Ret	15	11						Ret	26
21	(Italy) Tommaso Marcon	Aprilia												Ret	1	Ret	25
22	(United States) Sam Wiest	Aprilia			14	15	10	Ret	14				13	13	13		20
23	(United States) Jared Trees	Suzuki			11	11										10	16
24	(United States) Dustin Walbon	Suzuki	13	11	12	13	Ret										15
25	(United States) Joe Melendez	Suzuki	12	18	19	14				Ret						7	15
26	(United States) Alex Taylor	Yamaha						8	11	14							15
27	(United States) Robert Bettencourt	Yamaha	14	10									18	Ret	18	12	12
28	(United States) Rodney Vest	Suzuki	16	14	22	19	20	10	17	23	13	Ret	20	17	16	17	11
29	(United States) Jordan Edginton	Yamaha								15	11	12					10
30	(United States) Brett Donahue	Yamaha					7				DNS	Ret					9
31	(United States) Cassidy Heiser	Suzuki											7				9
32	(United States) Andrew Kruse	Suzuki					13				Ret	10					9
33	(United States) Daniel Mataczynski	Suzuki									10	13					9
34	(United States) Trevor Cece	Suzuki									12	14	DNS				6
35	(United States) Cliff Ramsdell	Suzuki	18	15	24	18	17	11	18	22							6
36	(United States) Heather Trees	Suzuki	15	12			21						DSQ				5
37	(United States) Brian Rogers	Yamaha					11				DNS	DNS					5
38	(United States) Carl Price	Aprilia											17			11	5
39	(United States) Kris Lillegard	Yamaha														13	3
40	(United States) Jerry Reeves	Suzuki											14				2
41	(United States) Brian Mullins	Suzuki					14						16			25	2
42	(United States) Chris Speights	Kawasaki			21	DNS								15	DSQ		1
43	(United States) Brad Faas	Aprilia												16	15		1
44	(Puerto Rico) Edwin Cosme	Aprilia	21		26	22	19				DNS	15	22	18	17	16	1
45	(United States) Gino Angella	Yamaha	20	17	23	20	18			24							0
46	(United States) Jonathan Champ	Suzuki									Ret	Ret					0
47	(Mexico) Jorge Ehrenstein	Yamaha								DNS							0
48	(United States) Justin Filice	Kawasaki								Ret							0
49	(United States) Andrew Gold	Suzuki			16	DNS											0
50	(Poland) Patryk Buchcik	Suzuki								16							0
51	(United States) Christopher Evans	Aprilia	19	16													0
52	(United States) Valentine Welch	Yamaha						DNS	19	18							0
53	(United States) Ryan Smith	Aprilia														20	0
54	(United States) Paul Geldziler	Yamaha								20							0
55	(United States) Chandler Slagle	Suzuki														21	0
56	(United States) Michael Kim	Suzuki								21							0
57	(United States) Michael Martin	Yamaha														23	0
58	(United States) Eric Reed	Suzuki														24	0
59	(United States) Ryan Peterson	Yamaha								25							0
60	(United States) Greg Reisinger	Suzuki			25	21							21			26	0
61	(United States) Zach Thomas	Suzuki														27	0
Pos	Rider	Bike	RAT (Georgia (U.S. state))		VIR (Virginia)		RAM (Wisconsin)	RID (Washington (state))		MON (California)	BRA (Minnesota)		PIT (Pennsylvania)	NJE (New Jersey)	ALA (Alabama)	Pts	
