= J. D. Beach =

American motorcycle racer

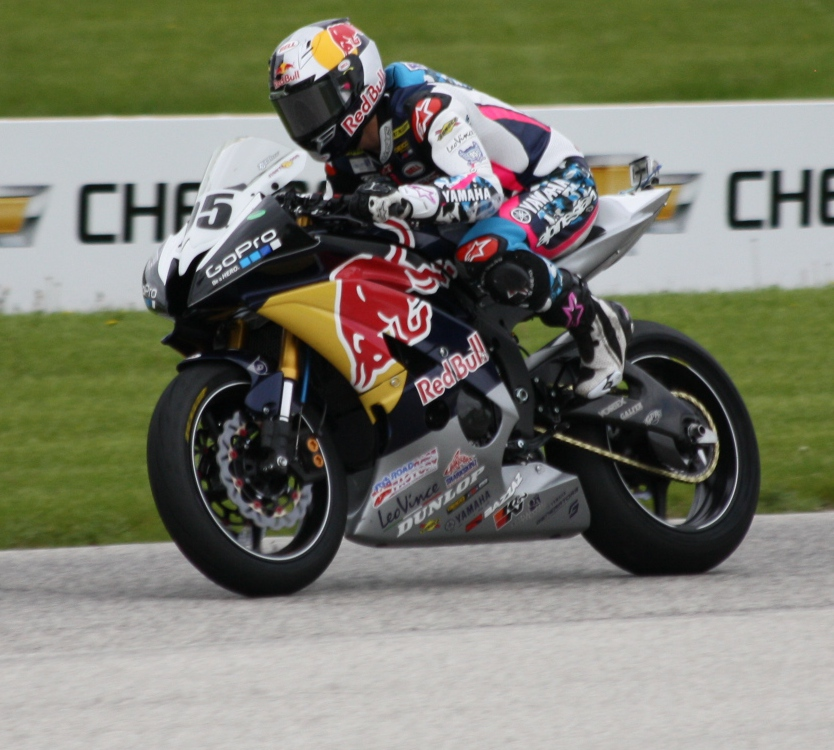
- Beach racing his Sport Bike at Road America in 2013
- Born: October 12, 1991 (age 35); Snoqualmie, Washington, United States
- Current team: Monster Energy / Yamaha Extended Service / Graves / Yamaha
- Bike number: 95
Motorcycle racing career statistics
Moto2 World Championship
Active years	2011
Manufacturers	FTR Honda
Championships	0
2011 championship position	NC (0 pts)
Starts / Wins / Podiums / Poles / F. laps / Points; 1 / 0 / 0 / 0 / 0 / 0

James Douglas Beach (born October 12, 1991) is an American motorcycle racer. He currently races a Yamaha YZF-R1 in the MotoAmerica Superbike Championship and he is currently being coached by former AMA racer Ken Hill.

== Career ==
Born in Snoqualmie, Washington and based in Philpot, Kentucky, Beach won the Red Bull MotoGP Rookies Cup in 2008 and the AMA Pro Supersport East Championship in 2010. In 2011, he made a one-off appearance in the Moto2 World Championship, replacing Tommaso Lorenzetti for the Aeroport de Castelló team in the Indianapolis Grand Prix. After competing in the AMA Superbike Championship and the Daytona SportBike Championship from 2011 to 2014, in 2015 he won the MotoAmerica Supersport Championship. In 2016, Beach came four points short of winning his second consecutive MotoAmerica title. He won seven races in the Championship. In 2018, Beach won the championship in the MotoAmerica Supersport Series.

== Career statistics ==
=== Red Bull MotoGP Rookies Cup ===
==== Races by year ====
(key) (Races in bold indicate pole position, races in italics indicate fastest lap)

Year	1	2	3	4	5	6	7	8	9	10	Pos	Pts
2007	SPA; 14	ITA; 10	GBR; 13	NED; 10	GER; 13	CZE; 8	POR; 17	VAL; 18			16th	28
2008	SPA1; 2	SPA2; 2	POR; 2	FRA; 2	ITA; 2	GBR; 5	NED; 8	GER; 1	CZE1; 11	CZE2; Ret	1st	149

=== Grand Prix motorcycle racing ===
==== By season ====
Season	Class	Motorcycle	Team	Race	Win	Podium	Pole	FLap	Pts	Plcd	WCh
2011	Moto2	FTR Moto M211	Aeroport de Castelló	1	0	0	0	0	0	NC	–
Total				**1**	**0**	**0**	**0**	**0**	**0**		**0**

==== By class ====
Class	Seasons	1st GP	1st Pod	1st Win	Race	Win	Podiums	Pole	FLap	Pts	WChmp
Moto2	2011	2011 Indianapolis			1	0	0	0	0	0	0
Total	2011				**1**	**0**	**0**	**0**	**0**	**0**	**0**

==== Races by year ====
(key) (Races in bold indicate pole position; races in italics indicate fastest lap)

Year	Class	Bike	1	2	3	4	5	6	7	8	9	10	11	12	13	14	15	16	17	Pos	Pts
2011	Moto2	FTR	QAT	SPA	POR	FRA	CAT	GBR	NED	ITA	GER	CZE	INP; 29	RSM	ARA	JPN	AUS	MAL	VAL	NC	0

=== MotoAmerica SuperBike Championship ===
==== Races by year ====
(key) (Races in bold indicate pole position; races in italics indicate fastest lap)

==== Results ====
Year	Class	Team	1		2		3		4		5		6		7		8			9			10		Pos	Pts
Year	Class	Team	R1	R2	R1	R2	R1	R2	R1	R2	R1	R2	R1	R2	R1	R2	R1	R2	R3	R1	R2	R3	R1	R2	Pos	Pts
2011	SuperBike	Kawasaki	DAY	DAY	INF; 9	INF; Ret	UTA; 15		RAM; 11	RAM; Ret	BAR; 8	BAR; 10	MOH; 10	MOH; 8	LAG; 12		NJE; 16	NJE; 10							12th	101
2019	SuperBike	Yamaha	ATL; 3	ATL; 4	COA; 5	COA; Ret	VIR; 4	VIR; 1	RAM; 7	RAM; 4	UMC; Ret	UMC; 5	LGS; 4	LGS; 5	SON; 4	SON; 5	PIT; 6	PIT; 6		NJR; 3	NJR; 2		BAR; 5	BAR; Ret	**4th**	**226**
2021	SuperBike	Yamaha	ATL	ATL	VIR	VIR	RAM	RAM	TRD	TRD	LGS	LGS	BRA; 6	BRA; 6	PIT	PIT	NJR	NJR	NJR	ALA	ALA	ALA			23rd	20

=== MotoAmerica Supersport Championship ===
==== Races by year ====
Year	Class	Team	1		2		3		4		5		6		7		8		9		Pos	Pts
Year	Class	Team	R1	R2	R1	R2	R1	R2	R1	R2	R1	R2	R1	R2	R1	R2	R1	R2	R1	R2	Pos	Pts
2020	Supersport	Yamaha	RAM	RAM	RAM	RAM	ATL	ATL	PIT	PIT	TRD	TRD	NJR	NJR	ALA	ALA	BRI	BRI	LGS; Ret	LGS; 3	20th	16

Sporting positions
Preceded by Johann Zarco	Red Bull MotoGP Rookies Cup champion 2008	Succeeded by Jakub Kornfeil
Preceded by Josh Day	AMA Pro Supersport East champion 2010	Succeeded by James Rispoli
Preceded by Hayden Gillim	MotoAmerica Supersport champion 2015	Succeeded by Garrett Gerloff
