= 2025 MotoAmerica Superstock 1000 Championship =

The 2025 MotoAmerica Superstock 1000 Championship season was the eleventh season of the Superstock 1000 class. The Superstock 1000 season started on May 2 at Road Atlanta, and finished on September 14 at Circuit of the Americas. This was the final season of the Superstock 1000 championship as a standalone series. Starting in 2026, the Superstock 1000 has been combined with the Superbike Cup to help expand the Superbike Championship.

The season ended with Andrew Lee of Orange Cat Racing winning his third Superstock 1000 championship.

== Calendar and Results ==
The 2025 schedule was announced on September 10, 2024.

Round		Circuit	Date	Pole position	Fastest lap	Race winners
1	R1	(Georgia (U.S. state)) Road Atlanta, Georgia	May 2–4	(United States) Andrew Lee	(United States) Jayson Uribe	(United States) Andrew Lee
1	R2	(Georgia (U.S. state)) Road Atlanta, Georgia	May 2–4		(United States) Jayson Uribe	(United States) Jayson Uribe
2	R1	Road America, Wisconsin	May 30 – June 1	(United States) Andrew Lee	(United States) Jayson Uribe	(United States) Andrew Lee
2	R2	Road America, Wisconsin	May 30 – June 1		(United States) Andrew Lee	(United States) Andrew Lee
3	R1	Virginia International Raceway, Virginia	August 1–3	(United States) J. D. Beach	(United States) Bryce Kornbau	(United States) J. D. Beach
3	R2	Virginia International Raceway, Virginia	August 1–3		(United States) Andrew Lee	(United States) J. D. Beach
4	R1	Mid-Ohio Sports Car Course, Ohio	August 15–17	(United States) J. D. Beach	(United States) Jayson Uribe	(United States) J. D. Beach
4	R2	Mid-Ohio Sports Car Course, Ohio	August 15–17		(United States) Andrew Lee	(United States) Andrew Lee
5	R1	Circuit of the Americas, Texas	September 12–14	(United States) Ashton Yates	(United States) Jayson Uribe	(United States) J. D. Beach
5	R2	Circuit of the Americas, Texas	September 12–14		(United States) Jayson Uribe	(United States) J. D. Beach

== Teams and riders ==
2025 Entry List
Team	Manufacturer	No.	Rider	Rounds
PS² Racing	Aprilia	28	(United States) Cory Ventura	1–2
PS² Racing	Aprilia	851	(United States) Kaleb De Keyrel	5
Crash Bandicoots Racing	BMW	811	(United States) Eric Smith	1–2
DLow Racing	BMW	187	(Canada) Justin Delong	5
Durbin Racing	BMW	625	(United States) Christopher Durbin	All
Edge Racing	BMW	92	(United States) Jason Waters	All
Hart Racing	BMW	896	(United States) Philip Hart	1, 3–5
Ikonic Yachts	BMW	191	(United States) A. J. Blackmon	3–5
Misfit Racing	BMW	828	(United States) Marshal Rosas	5
Orange Cat Racing	BMW	14	(United States) Andrew Lee	All
Orange Cat Racing	BMW	36	(United States) Jayson Uribe	All
Prestige Worldwide Coaching	BMW	773	(United States) Mark Taylor	3–5
Privateer Motorsports	BMW	693	(United States) Mike Bishop	1–3
Seriously Casual Motorsports	BMW	260	(Canada) Phillip Leckie	2
Taylor Knapp Racing	BMW	441	(United States) Taylor Knapp	1, 4
Team Germany – TSE Racing	BMW	119	(Germany) Stefan Dolipski	2
Top Pro Motorsports	BMW	89	(Colombia) Alex Arango	1–2, 5
Top Pro Motorsports/CJKNOWS	BMW	851	(United States) Kaleb De Keyrel	2
Top Pro Motorsports/Mesa37	BMW	37	(Colombia) Stefano Mesa	5
Ugoh Racing	BMW	528	(United States) Anthony Ugoh	5
Equipo KrissCross MMYJ	Ducati	190	(Mexico) Ivan Muñoz	5
3D Motorsports	Honda	74	(United States) Gabriel Da Silva	1–2
Altus Motorsports	Honda	59	(United States) Jaret Nassaney	5
Castrol/Lamkin Racing	Honda	21	(United States) Nolan Lamkin	3–5
Corrientes Racing Team/ MPR Motorsport	Honda	919	(Argentina) Emanuel Aguilar	1, 3
Crashbandicoots Racing	Honda	511	(Canada) Jeff Tait	4
Jones Honda	Honda	27	(United States) Ashton Yates	All
Limitless Racing	Honda	84	(United States) Joseph Giannotto	All
Real Steel Honda	Honda	95	(United States) J. D. Beach	All
Red Lobo Racing	Honda	222	(United States) Manuel Segura	1–4
Team Sloppy Sprockets Honda Racing	Honda	800	(United States) Trevor Watson	1–2, 4–5
BB52 Motorsports	Kawasaki	520	(United States) Billy Ball	4
Gerardot Racing Team	Kawasaki	814	(United States) Josh Gerardot	4
MisFit Racing	Kawasaki	804	(United States) Shelik Spencer	5
PDR Motorsports	Kawasaki	135	(Spain) Diego Pérez	5
Privateer Motorsports	Kawasaki	83	(United States) Anthony Norton	2–5
Seethaler Racing	Kawasaki	624	(United States) Nathan Seethaler	All
Team Storniolo	Kawasaki	179	(United States) Tony Storniolo	2
3D Motorsports	Suzuki	972	(United Kingdom) Steven Shakespeare	2–5
FBT Motorsports	Suzuki	128	(United States) Andrew Bolton	1, 3
Posse Racing	Suzuki	174	(United States) William Posse	All
Realty One	Suzuki	310	(United States) Rodney Vest	3–4
RevZilla/Motul/Vance & Hines Suzuki	Suzuki	977	(United States) Rocco Landers	All
WRT	Suzuki	985	(Colombia) Erwin Ramirez	3
Arion Racing	Yamaha	149	(United States) Kyle Coles	5
The Bike Experience USA	Yamaha	669	(United States) Eziah Davis	All
BPR Racing Yamaha	Yamaha	17	(United States) Bryce Kornbau	All
BPR Racing Yamaha	Yamaha	194	(United States) Deion Campbell	All
Crash Bandicoots Racing	Yamaha	120	(Albania) Gjonlek Kalaj	4
Elliott Racing Powered By Kat Works LLC	Yamaha	997	(United States) Kreece Elliott	1–3
Escape Blowdry Bar Racing	Yamaha	298	(United States) Ned Brown	3
FLO4LAW/SBU Racing	Yamaha	77	(United States) Bobby Davies	All
Impact Racing	Yamaha	98	(United States) Jeremy Simmons	1–4
Legacy Dental/Poly Evolution	Yamaha	31	(United States) Jeffrey Purk	2
Metronome Racing	Yamaha	627	(United States) Matt Spinak	1, 3
Nashville Racing Team	Yamaha	126	(United States) Kyle Kearcher	1
OTW Racing	Yamaha	381	(United States) Leroy Eshelman	4
Ready to Ride	Yamaha	249	(United States) Jordan Eubanks	All
Ready to Ride	Yamaha	270	(United States) Ryne Snooks	3
RedBoy Motorsports	Yamaha	198	(United States) Rance Taylor	5
Ryhno Racing	Yamaha	411	(United States) Ryan Nolan	2
S1 Racing	Yamaha	617	(United States) Gage Mollman	1
Superbike Supply	Yamaha	900	(United States) Zachary Schumacher	All
Turn One Racing	Yamaha	410	(United States) Steve Olson	2
Yelton Racing/GP Motorsales	Yamaha	118	(United States) Dylan Yelton	1–2, 4

== Championship standings ==
=== Scoring system ===
Points are awarded to the top fifteen finishers. A rider has to finish the race to earn points.

Position	1st	2nd	3rd	4th	5th	6th	7th	8th	9th	10th	11th	12th	13th	14th	15th
Points	25	20	16	13	11	10	9	8	7	6	5	4	3	2	1

=== Riders' championship ===
Pos	Rider	Bike	ATL (Georgia (U.S. state))		RAM (Wisconsin)		VIR (Virginia)		OHI (Ohio)		TEX (Texas)		Pts
1	(United States) Andrew Lee	BMW	1^{P}	2	1^{P}	1^{F}	5	3^{F}	3	1^{F}	4	4	189
2	(United States) J. D. Beach	Honda	4	4	2	3	1^{P}	1	1^{P}	DNS	1	1	187
3	(United States) Jayson Uribe	BMW	2^{F}	1^{F}	3^{F}	Ret	4	2	2^{F}	2	2^{F}	2^{F}	174
4	(United States) Ashton Yates	Honda	3	3	4	2	3	5	13	Ret	3^{P}	3	127
5	(United States) Bryce Kornbau	Yamaha	DNS	5	5	4	2^{F}	4	4	Ret	6	Ret	91
6	(United States) Jason Waters	BMW	7	6	7	5	6	Ret	6	5	9	7	86
7	(United States) Rocco Landers	Suzuki	9	9	6	8	7	6	8	Ret	5	5	81
8	(United States) Deion Campbell	Yamaha	5	11	33	9	Ret	DNS	5	3	7	8	67
9	(United States) Eziah Davis	Yamaha	6	7	13	7	9	Ret	9	9	11	10	63
10	(United States) Nolan Lamkin	Honda					8	7	7	4	8	6	57
11	(United States) Christopher Durbin	BMW	8	10	11	11	11	Ret	10	6	10	11	56
12	(United States) Joseph Giannotto	Honda	11	14	12	12	10	Ret	11	8	DNS	DNS	34
13	(Colombia) Alex Arango	BMW	12	12	10	10					Ret	12	24
14	(United States) Taylor Knapp	BMW	DNS	8					12	7			21
15	(Argentina) Emanuel Aguilar	Honda	10	13			12	8					21
16	(United States) Gabriel Da Silva	Honda	14	17	8	6							20
17	(United States) Nathan Seethaler	Kawasaki	17	25	16	14	15	10	17	11	17	21	14
18	(United States) Bobby Davies	Yamaha	18	16	27	19	13	9	DNS	WD	12	27	14
19	(United States) Kaleb De Keyrel	BMW / Aprilia			9	23					14	13	12
20	(United States) Jordan Eubanks	Yamaha	15	21	21	18	14	21	18	10	31	17	9
21	(United States) William Posse	Suzuki	23	28	20	20	18	14	14	12	24	20	8
22	(Colombia) Stefano Mesa	BMW									Ret	9	7
23	(United States) Ryne Snooks	Yamaha					20	11					5
24	(United States) Eric Smith	BMW	Ret	15	15	13							5
25	(United States) Anthony Norton	Kawasaki			24	22	Ret	17	Ret	13	15	15	5
26	(United States) A. J. Blackmon	BMW					21	12	Ret	19	19	22	4
27	(United States) Matt Spinak	Yamaha	24	27			17	13					3
28	(United States) Jeremy Simmons	Yamaha	13	18	23	21	22	18	20	17			3
29	(United States) Kyle Coles	Yamaha									13	18	3
30	(Canada) Justin Delong	BMW									22	14	2
31	(United States) Manuel Segura	Honda	22	23	22	17	25	19	16	14			2
32	(United States) Cory Ventura	Aprilia	DNS	Ret	14	32							2
33	(United States) Dylan Yelton	Yamaha	20	22	25	24			15	DNS			1
34	(United States) Kreece Elliott	Yamaha	DNS	20	18	15	Ret	DNS					1
35	(United States) Zachary Schumacher	Yamaha	21	24	19	16	23	15	21	16	16	16	1
36	(United States) Philip Hart	BMW	DNS	DNS			26	16	22	15	18	19	1
37	(Spain) Diego Pérez	Kawasaki									DSQ	Ret	0
38	(United States) Shelik Spencer	Kawasaki									27	Ret	0
39	(United Kingdom) Steven Shakespeare	Suzuki			Ret	27	29	24	23	23	28	Ret	0
40	(United States) Rance Taylor	Yamaha									30	DNS	0
41	(United States) Jaret Nassaney	Honda									Ret	WD	0
42	(Albania) Gjonlek Kalaj	Yamaha							19	DNS			0
43	(United States) Mike Bishop	BMW	25	29	30	28	27	DNS					0
44	(United States) Tony Storniolo	Kawasaki			17	Ret							0
45	(United States) Ryan Nolan	Yamaha			Ret	WD							0
46	(United States) Gage Mollman	Yamaha	26	Ret									0
47	(United States) Kyle Kearcher	Yamaha	DNS	WD									0
48	(Canada) Jeff Tait	Honda							Ret	18			0
49	(United States) Billy Ball	Kawasaki							NC	20			0
50	(Colombia) Erwin Ramirez	Suzuki					28	22					0
51	(United States) Marshal Rosas	BMW									20	23	0
52	(United States) Andrew Bolton	Suzuki	16	19			19	23					0
53	(United States) Mark Taylor	BMW					24	20	Ret	22	23	24	0
54	(United States) Josh Gerardot	Kawasaki							24	24			0
55	(Mexico) Ivan Muñoz	Ducati									21	25	0
56	(United States) Rodney Vest	Suzuki					Ret	Ret	25	25			0
57	(United States) Ned Brown	Yamaha					16	25					0
58	(Canada) Phillip Leckie	BMW			28	25							0
59	(United States) Anthony Ugoh	BMW									26	26	0
60	(United States) Leroy Eshelman	Yamaha							Ret	26			0
61	(United States) Trevor Watson	Honda	19	26	26	26			Ret	21	29	28	0
62	(United States) Jeffrey Purk	Yamaha			31	30					25	29	0
63	(United States) Steve Olson	Yamaha			29	29							0
64	(Germany) Stefan Dolipski	BMW			32	31							0
Pos	Rider	Bike	ATL (Georgia (U.S. state))		RAM (Wisconsin)		VIR (Virginia)		OHI (Ohio)		TEX (Texas)		Pts

Colour	Result
Gold	Winner
Silver	Second place
Bronze	Third place
Green	Points classification
Blue	Non-points classification
Blue	Non-classified finish (NC)
Purple	Retired, not classified (Ret)
Red	Did not qualify (DNQ)
Red	Did not pre-qualify (DNPQ)
Black	Disqualified (DSQ)
White	Did not start (DNS)
White	Withdrew (WD)
White	Race cancelled (C)
Blank	Did not practice (DNP)
Blank	Did not arrive (DNA)
Blank	Excluded (EX)

P - Pole position
F - Fastest lap
