= MotoAmerica =

North American Motorcycle Road Racing Organization

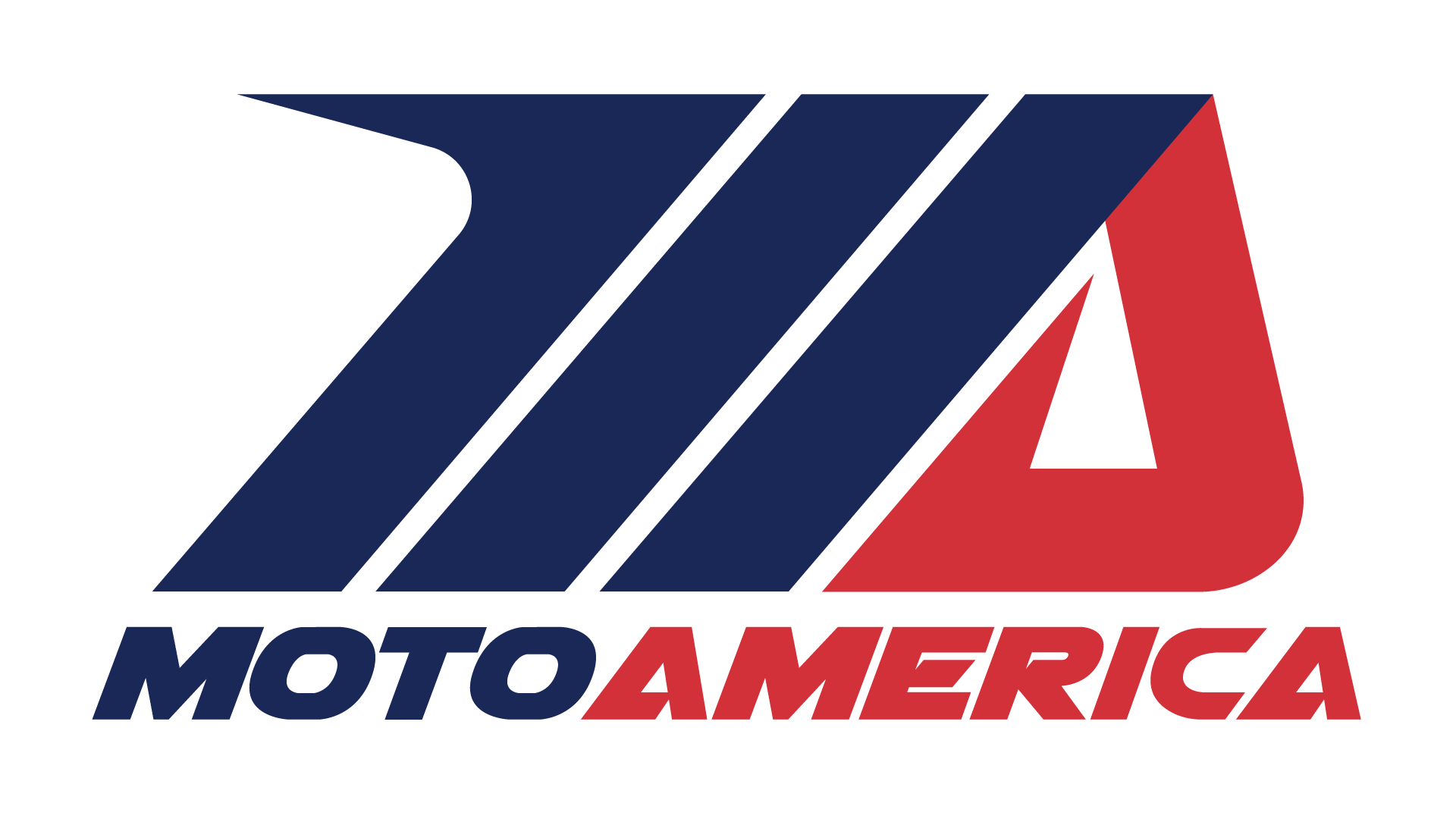
- The official MotoAmerica Logo
- Category: Motorcycle sport
- Jurisdiction: North America
- Headquarters: Irvine, California
- President: Wayne Rainey

Official website
- www.motoamerica.com

MotoAmerica
- Current champions: Cameron Beaubier

MotoAmerica is the organization that promotes and organizes the AMA Road Racing series. Formally known as the MotoAmerica AMA/FIM North American Road Racing Championship, it is sanctioned by the American Motorcyclist Association (AMA) and the Fédération Internationale de Motocyclisme (FIM). MotoAmerica is the preeminent professional motorcycle racing organization in the United States, currently featuring eight separate classes of road racing, including Superbike and Supersport.

MotoAmerica's primary goal is to reinvigorate motorcycle road racing in North America, and send its riders to top-level international championships. MotoAmerica is an affiliate of the KRAVE Group, a partnership that includes Wayne Rainey, Chuck Aksland, Terry Karges, and Richard Varner. The KRAVE Group was formed with the intent to purchase the commercial rights to the AMA Road Racing Series. In 2015, MotoAmerica became the organizer and promoter of the AMA Road Racing series, and all championships are now held under the MotoAmerica name.

== History ==
MotoAmerica can trace its history back to the beginning of production based motorcycle road racing in the United States. In 1976, the American Motorcycle Association (AMA) began sanctioning and organizing road racing series such as the AMA Superbike Championship. Originally these AMA road racing series were held at the Grand National events alongside the dirt track and motocross events.

Through the succeeding years, the popularity of road racing grew and necessitated a split from the Grand National Championship. A separate Road Racing Championship was created for the 1986 season. Soon after, additional production based road racing series were added to the AMA Road Racing Championship, such as the 750 Supersport and 600 Supersport series. The various AMA Road Racing Series continued to grow in popularity and experienced a period of great prosperity through the 1990’s. Competition, manufacturer support, and fan attendance were high during this period. Riders coming from the AMA series commonly went on to race in Gran Prix and World Superbike races.

=== AMA Pro Racing ===
The AMA Road Racing Championship continued to be organized and sanctioned by the AMA until, in 2008 Rob Dingman, the CEO of AMA announced that he was selling the sanctioning, promotional and management rights of AMA Pro Racing to the Daytona Motorsports Group. The leadership of AMA at the time wanted to distance themselves from their racing activities to focus on being a membership organization and providing membership benefits. Rob Dingman claimed that the AMA was facing too much controversy as the sanctioning body for the racing series and that they needed to return to their core values. To accomplish this, the AMA chose the Daytona Motorsports Group (DMG) led by Jim France, the CEO of NASCAR and Roger Edmonson, President of the Grand American Road Race Series, to handle all of the commercial aspects of their racing series.

Unfortunately, the leadership at DMG ended up doing a poor job operating and marketing the road racing series, and the timing of the 2008 financial crisis did not help matters. Many longstanding factory teams dropped out of the series for the 2009 season and along with them, sponsors and fans left the sport as well. The number of races per season was cut in half, going from twelve in 2009 to six in 2014, with even fewer receiving television coverage. Despite some intermittent factory involvement from BMW and KTM, the number of Superbike entrants per race continued to fall, with only 15 motorcycles competing at Road America in 2014.

Troubled with how DMG was operating the road racing series, the KRAVE group was formed. KRAVE is a partnership that includes three-time Grand Prix World Champion, two-time AMA Superbike Champion, and AMA Hall of Famer, Wayne Rainey; former vice president of motorsports operations at the Circuit of The Americas, and former managing director of Team Roberts in the Grand Prix World Championship, Chuck Aksland; executive director of the Petersen Automotive Museum, Terry Karges; and energy sector investor and businessman, Richard Varner. KRAVE approached the AMA in 2013 with an intent to purchase the commercial rights to the road racing series. Through “complicated” negotiations, the AMA reacquired the sanctioning rights to all AMA road racing series from the Daytona Motorsports Group, and sold the commercial rights to KRAVE. In 2014, it was announced that MotoAmerica, the affiliate of KRAVE, was going to be organizing and promoting the road racing series starting in 2015. The classes inherited at the time from DMG included: Superbike, Superstock 1000, Supersport, Superstock 600, and the KTM RC 390 Cup.

=== MotoAmerica ===
For its inaugural season as the series organizer, MotoAmerica, in consultation with the AMA, chose to align the multiple existing racing classes closely with those used by the FIM. This was done to simplify the work that manufacturers must do to compete in multiple series, and therefore attract them back to North American road racing. The 2015 season expanded the calendar with 10 rounds, seeing races return to many fan favorite tracks from the past. Importantly, MotoAmerica established television broadcasting agreements with CBS Sports to air the full season of races. Due to the low number of entrants in the Superbike class, the Stock 1000 class was run concurrently in order to fill out the grid. Similarly, the Superstock 600 class was run in the same race as the Supersport class.

The series crowned its first champions in 2015; with Cameron Beaubier winning the Superbike championship, Jake Gagne winning Superstock 1000, J. D. Beach winning Supersport, Joe Roberts winning Superstock 600 and Gage McAllister winning the KTM RC 390 Cup.

In 2018, MotoAmerica restructured many of its classes as the series had gained enough entrants to fill a moderately sized grid (16-18 machines as opposed to as few as 9 in previous seasons) for each class. MotoAmerica recognized that running multiple classes in each race was confusing to fans, and the rules necessary to keep the classes competitive with each other resulted in them being too similar. The Superstock 1000 bikes, meant to be less modified and therefore slower than the Superbike class, ended up having motorcycles that were competing near the front of the Superbike class at every round. The relationship between Supersport and Superstock 600 has similar problems.

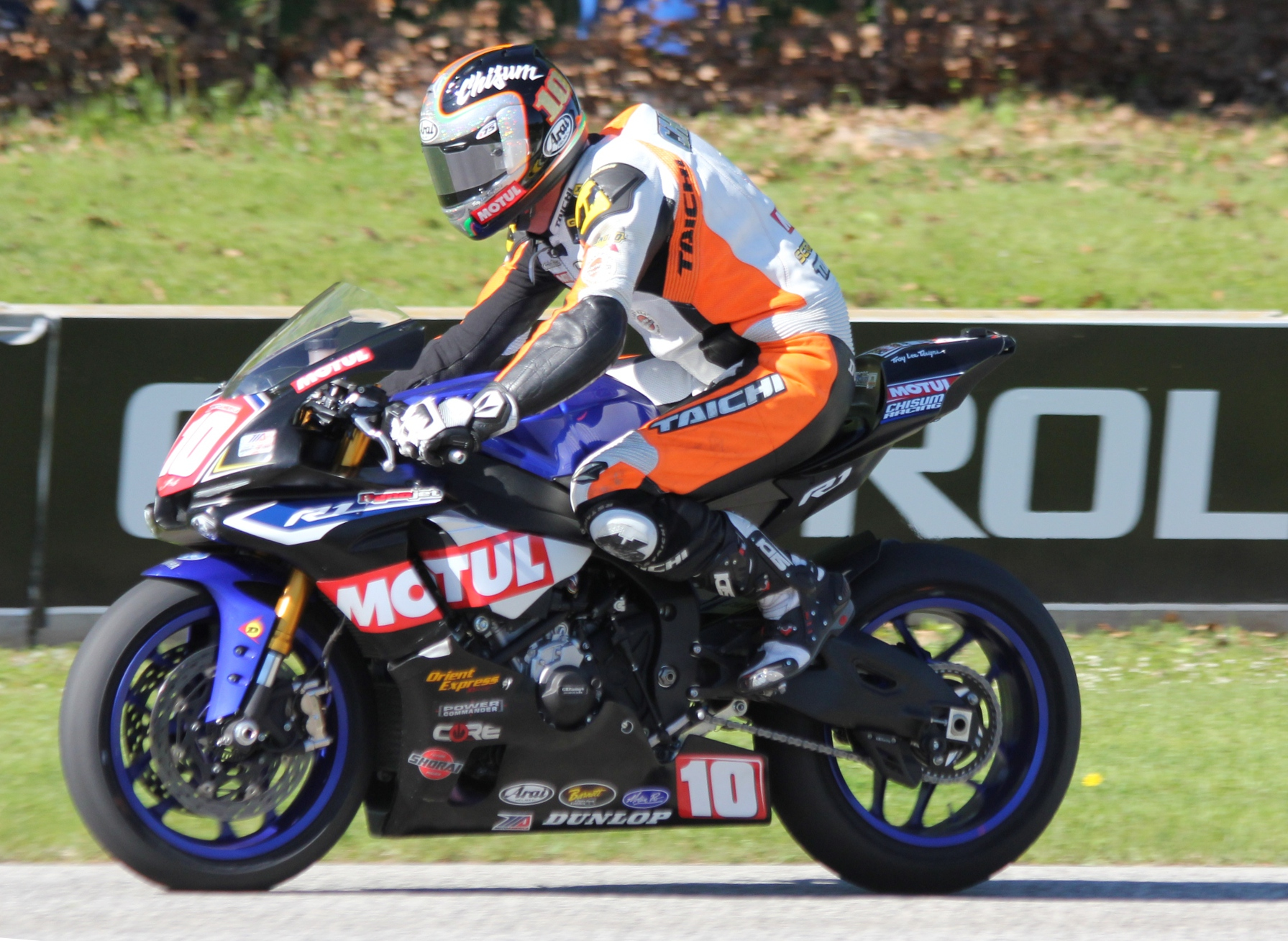
Josh Chisum riding a Superstock 1000 bike for the 2015 season.

The Superstock 1000 class was replaced by the Stock 1000 class. This new class differed from the class it replaced by permitting very few modifications from the showroom specifications of the road-legal machines. Lights, indicators, stands, and mirrors must be removed and a race fairing may be fitted, but the use of expensive replacement engines and certain other parts is prohibited. This ruleset was designed to make the class more accessible and approachable in order to get more riders on 1000cc machines. The goal of Stock 1000 is to be the feeder class to the Superbike class. These rule changes also were to encourage the existing Superstock 1000 teams, with their already highly built bikes to make the jump up to the Superbike class.

The Superstock 600 class was also dropped, with its place on the program being taken by the new Twins Cup class. In contrast to the Stock 1000 series, this is a fairly open class where development and modifications are allowed with a great degree of freedom as long as a twin-cylinder machine is used. These machines produce similar performance to the Superstock 600 bikes they replace, but allow the use of the large variety of two cylinder sport bikes that had become popular in the club racing scene. The Supersport class rules were modified to be somewhat in between those of the old Superstock 600 class and Supersport class. This was to make it easy for the existing Superstock 600 teams to make the step up to Supersport.

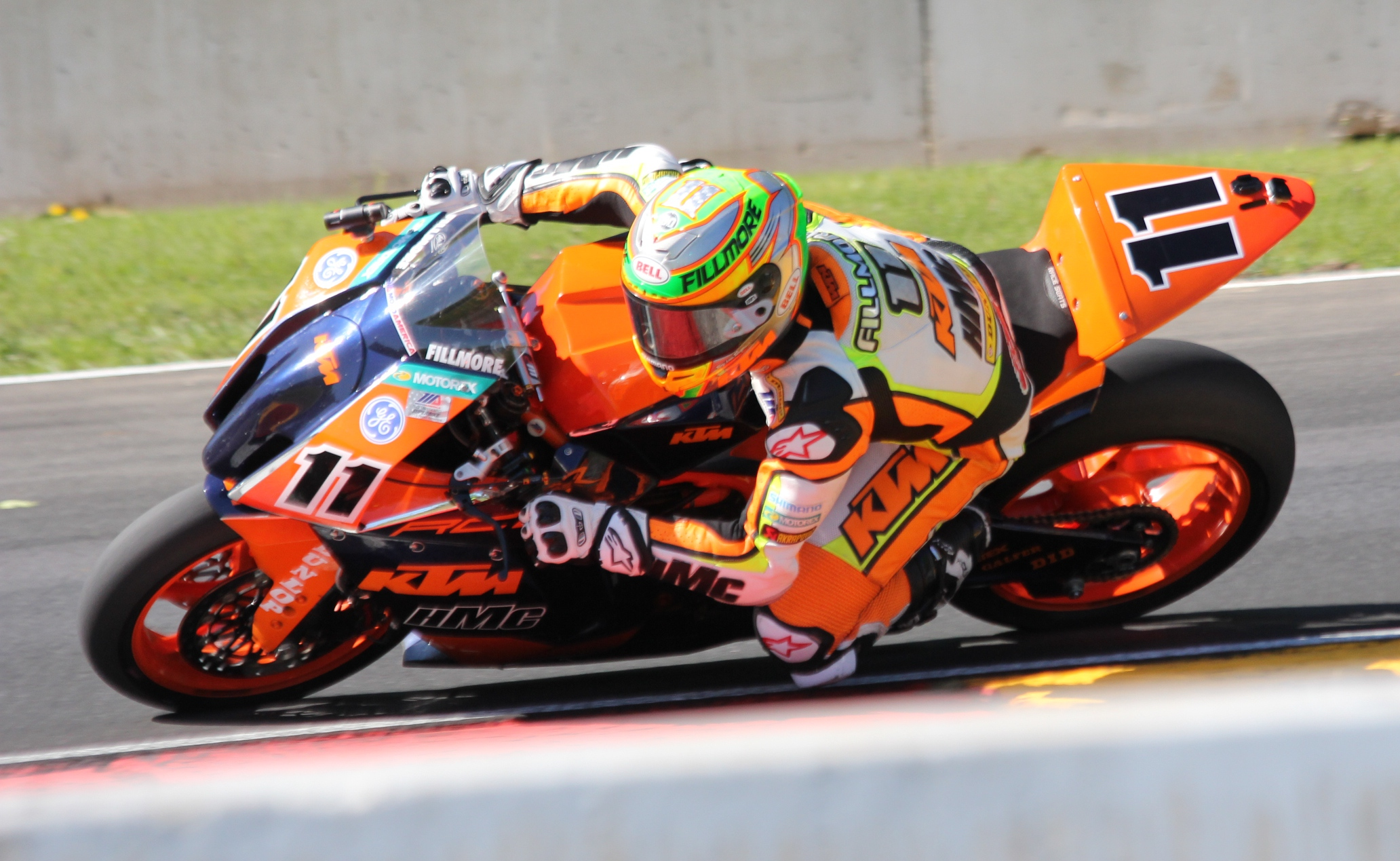
Chris Gilmore riding a KTM RC 390 for the 2015 season

The last class change for 2018 was the introduction of the Junior Cup class as a replacement for the KTM RC 390 Cup. This new class is open to all manufacturers of small bore sportsbikes, instead of being a spec series. Encouraged by the success of similar series at the world championship level, this championship was introduced as a new entry-level class with a maximum age limit of 25 years old. All of these new classes now competed in their own race events, bringing clarity to the differentiation between each class. With 5 different races occurring per event instead of the previous 3, fans were able to enjoy the additional racing as well.

In 2019, MotoAmerica chose to bring all television production of its TV coverage in house. This move allowed MotoAmerica to own the rights to all of the content produced from every race weekend, and as a result, they became able to distribute content on far more platforms than was possible before. Streaming options were introduced including Youtube and MotoAmerica’s own paid streaming service MotoAmerica Live +. Bringing the TV production in-house proved to be a successful decision for MotoAmerica. Combined viewership numbers for the first two rounds in 2020 increased fourfold from the previous year, reaching record highs for the organization.

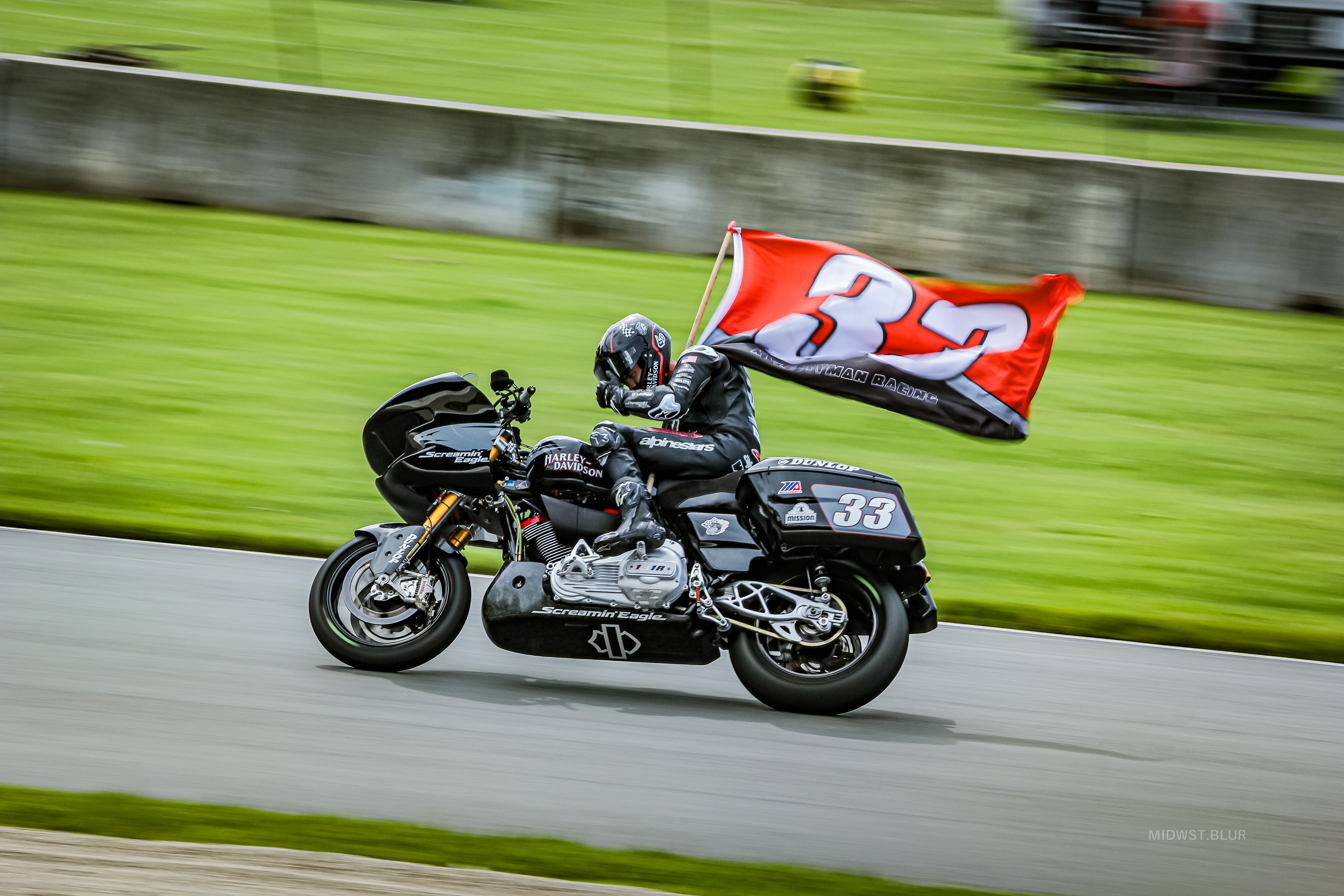
Kyle Wyman holding the flag aboard a King of the Baggers Harley Davidson

In 2020 it was announced that a new event would take place at the MotoAmerica Superbike Speedfest At Monterey. This invitational event, titled King of the Baggers, allowed highly customized American touring motorcycles to compete in a race. Touring fairings and hard side bags are required as part of the ruleset, but otherwise these machines were heavily modified for racing. The King of the Baggers invitational proved to be very popular with fans, so much so that it became an official class and was added to the 2021 calendar as a three round championship. In the following years, King of the Baggers continued to grow in popularity and has become a staple class in MotoAmerica. As of the 2024 season, the King of the Baggers class appeared at eight of the 10 rounds of the season with an additional exhibition race at a MotoGP event.

Partnering with Royal Enfield, a new exhibition race class called Build.Train.Race was added to the MotoAmerica calendar in 2021. The Build.Train.Race program equips women racers and builders with Royal Enfield Continental GT 650 motorcycles along with the necessary resources to prepare them for track use. Each year, a select number of women are chosen from an applicant pool to participate in the event. These riders go on to modify their Royal Enfield motorcycles themselves, with support from the Royal Enfield race shop. The riders then go on to receive road racing instruction and training from expert instructors before beginning the season of racing. Riders stay with the program for two years before graduating. As of the 2025 season, there are 12 riders in the program with 6 graduating each year. Typically, there are four to six Build.Train.Race exhibition races in a MotoAmerica season.

For the 2025 season, the Junior Cup class was dropped and replaced by the Talent Cup. This new junior class is a spec-racing class in which riders aged 14 to 21 compete on purpose-built Krämer APX-350 MA motorcycles. The shift back to spec racing is to align the MotoAmerica junior class with the other Talent cups that exist around the world, in order to better prepare young riders to eventually compete at the highest level of motorsport.

== Classes ==
=== Superbike ===
MotoAmerica's premier race class, Superbike showcases the top road racers aboard top-of-the-line, highly modified motorcycles capable of speeds approaching 200 miles per hour. Engine configurations and minimum weight requirements are listed below:

# of Cylinders	Engine Displacement	Typical Power	Minimum Weight
3 - 4	750 - 1000cc	220 hp	370.5 lbs
2	850 - 1200cc	220 hp	370.5 lbs

Rider Age Limit: 18 - 55 years old

Motorcycles that compete in this class: BMW S1000RR, Ducati Panigale V4 R, Honda CBR1000RR, Kawasaki Ninja ZX-10R, Suzuki GSX-R1000, Yamaha YZF-R1

=== Stock 1000 ===
A feeder class for Superbike, Stock 1000 gives MotoAmerica riders the opportunity to gain experience aboard 1,000cc motorcycles with an eye toward eventually moving up to Superbike. Engine configurations and minimum weight requirements are listed below:

# of Cylinders	Engine Displacement	Typical Power	Minimum Weight
3 - 4	750 - 1000cc	195 hp	374 lbs
2	850 - 1200cc	195 hp	374 lbs

Rider Age Limit: 18 - 55 years old

Motorcycles that compete in this class: BMW S1000RR, Honda CBR1000RR, Kawasaki Ninja ZX-10R, Suzuki GSX-R1000, Yamaha YZF-R1

=== Supersport ===
MotoAmerica's middleweight race class, Supersport features the series’ rising stars competing aboard production-based motorcycles. Engine configurations and minimum weight requirements are listed below:

# of Cylinders	Engine Displacement	Typical Power	Minimum Weight
4	400 - 636cc	130 hp	354.9 lbs
3	500 - 890cc	130 hp	354.9 lbs
2	600 - 955cc	130 hp	354.9 lbs

Rider Age Limit: 16 - 55 years old

Motorcycles that compete in this class: Ducati Panigale V2, Kawasaki Ninja ZX-6R, Suzuki GSX-R750, Yamaha YZF-R6, Yamaha YZF-R9, Honda CBR600RR, Triumph Street Triple RS 765

=== Twins Cup ===
Putting middleweight, twin-cylinder motorcycles in the spotlight, Twins Cup enables regional and club racers from around the country to step up to the MotoAmerica series and compete on a national level. Engine configurations and minimum weight requirements are listed below:

# of Cylinders	Engine Displacement	Typical Power	Minimum Weight
2	600 - 800cc	100 hp	338 lbs

Rider Age Limit: 15 - 55

Motorcycles that compete in this class: Aprilia RS 660, Yamaha YZF-R7, Suzuki GSX-8R, Kawasaki Ninja 650, Suzuki SV650

=== King of the Baggers ===
Modified touring motorcycles from Harley Davidson and Indian built for road racing. Motorcycles must feature touring fairings and hard side bags, but otherwise feature aftermarket suspension and highly tuned engines. The following models race in this class

- Harley-Davidson Road Glide
- Indian Challenger

Minimum Weight: 620 pounds

=== Royal Enfield Build.Train.Race. ===
Royal Enfield Build.Train.Race. (B.T.R.) is an all-women road racing championship run at select MotoAmerica events. Participants build and race-prepare Royal Enfield Continental GT 650 motorcycles, receive professional coaching, and compete on a national stage. The series uses the same base motorcycle for each rider; race-prepped bikes receive purpose-made bodywork and upgraded components.[1][2]

Motorcycle platform: Royal Enfield Continental GT 650, race-prepped

Engine: 648cc parallel twin, four-stroke

Stock road-bike output: 47 bhp at 7,150 rpm

The engine figures above are for the standard Continental GT 650; the official sources describe the B.T.R. bikes as modified race machines and don’t list a class-specific power figure or minimum weight.[2][3]

Sources

1. MotoAmerica: Build.Train.Race. overview and class specifications

2. MotoAmerica: 2026 B.T.R. season and race-bike preparation

3. Royal Enfield: Continental GT 650 technical specifications, Build.Train.Race. road racing program

=== Talent Cup ===
MotoAmerica's entry-level race class, Talent Cup features the series’ youngest riders competing aboard spec, purpose-built Krämer APX-350 MA motorcycles. Set to mirror other Road to MotoGP Talent Cups around the world, this class is meant to prepare young riders to advance to the upper echelons of motorcycles racing. Motorcycles specifications are listed below:

- 350cc, 4-stroke, single cylinder
- 55 horsepower
- Rider Age Limit: 14 - 21 years old

=== Super Hooligans ===
This class features motorcycles from various disciplines, along with a broad set of rules meant to bring new riders and brands into road racing. The MotoAmerica Championship in this class features 750cc and up, air- or water-cooled, 2 cylinders, 125 horsepower or less, minimum weight of 420 pounds, no bodywork, stock frames, high-bar motorcycles. Electric motorcycles are also eligible for competition. Minimum Weight in this class is 397 pounds

Engine Configurations:

- Air-Cooled Motorcycles

Originally equipped, air-cooled, 2-cylinder, minimum displacement of 750cc, normally aspirated or forced induction.

- Water-Cooled Motorcycles

Originally equipped, water-cooled, 2-cylinder, minimum displacement of 750cc, normally aspirated.

- Electric Motorcycles

Street-legal production motorcycles with single electric motors. No motocross or dual-sport-type electric motorcycles allowed. All electric motorcycles must be pre-approved for competition before the event or season.

== Champions ==
=== Superbike ===
Season	Rider	Manufacturer
2015	(United States) Cameron Beaubier	(Japan) Yamaha
2016	(United States) Cameron Beaubier	(Japan) Yamaha
2017	(Spain) Toni Elías	(Japan) Suzuki
2018	(United States) Cameron Beaubier	(Japan) Yamaha
2019	(United States) Cameron Beaubier	(Japan) Yamaha
2020	(United States) Cameron Beaubier	(Japan) Yamaha
2021	(United States) Jake Gagne	(Japan) Yamaha
2022	(United States) Jake Gagne	(Japan) Yamaha
2023	(United States) Jake Gagne	(Japan) Yamaha
2024	(United States) Josh Herrin	(Italy) Ducati
2025	(United States) Cameron Beaubier	(Germany) BMW
2026	(United States) Bobby Fong	(Japan) Yamaha

=== Stock 1000 ===
Previously known as Superstock 1000 from 2015–2017

Season	Rider	Manufacturer
2015	(United States) Jacob Gagne	(Japan) Yamaha
2016	(United States) Josh Herrin	(Japan) Yamaha
2017	(South Africa) Mathew Scholtz	(Japan) Yamaha
2018	(United States) Andrew Lee	(Japan) Kawasaki
2019	(United States) Andrew Lee	(Japan) Kawasaki
2020	(South Africa) Cameron Peterson	(Japan) Suzuki
2021	(United States) Jake Lewis	(Japan) Suzuki
2022	(United States) Corey Alexander	(Germany) BMW
2023	(United States) Hayden Gillim	(Japan) Suzuki
2024	(United States) Hayden Gillim	(Japan) Honda
2025	(United States) Andrew Lee	(Germany) BMW
2026	(United States) Andrew Lee	(Japan) Honda

=== Supersport ===
Season	Rider	Manufacturer
2015	(United States) J. D. Beach	(Japan) Yamaha
2016	(United States) Garrett Gerloff	(Japan) Yamaha
2017	(United States) Garrett Gerloff	(Japan) Yamaha
2018	(United States) J. D. Beach	(Japan) Yamaha
2019	(United States) Bobby Fong	(Japan) Suzuki
2020	(Mexico) Richie Escalante	(Japan) Kawasaki
2021	(United States) Sean Dylan Kelly	(Japan) Suzuki
2022	(United States) Josh Herrin	(Italy) Ducati
2023	(Spain) Xavi Forés	(Italy) Ducati
2024	(South Africa) Mathew Scholtz	(Japan) Yamaha
2025	(South Africa) Mathew Scholtz	(Japan) Yamaha
2026	(South Africa) Darryn Binder	(Italy) Ducati

=== Twins Cup ===
Previously known as Superstock 600 from 2015–2017

Season	Rider	Manufacturer
2015	(United States) Joe Roberts	(Japan) Yamaha
2016	(United States) Bryce Prince	(Japan) Yamaha
2017	(United States) Jason Aguilar	(Japan) Yamaha
2018	(United States) Chris Parrish	(Japan) Suzuki
2019	(Canada) Alex Dumas	(Japan) Suzuki
2020	(United States) Rocco Landers	(Japan) Suzuki
2021	(United States) Kaleb De Keyrel	(Italy) Aprilia
2022	(United States) Blake Davis	(Japan) Yamaha
2023	(United States) Blake Davis	(Japan) Yamaha
2024	(Italy) Alessandro Di Mario	(Italy) Aprilia
2025	(United States) Alessandro Di Mario	(Italy) Aprilia
2026	(United States) Hank Vossberg	(Italy) Aprilia

=== Junior Cup ===
Previously known as KTM RC 390 Cup from 2015–2017

Season	Rider	Manufacturer
2015	(United States) Gage McAllister	(Austria) KTM
2016	(United States) Brandon Paasch	(Austria) KTM
2017	(United States) Benjamin Smith	(Austria) KTM
2018	(Canada) Alex Dumas	(Austria) KTM
2019	(United States) Rocco Landers	(Japan) Kawasaki
2020	(United States) Rocco Landers	(Japan) Kawasaki
2021	(United States) Tyler Scott	(Austria) KTM
2022	(United States) Cody Wyman	(Japan) Kawasaki
2023	(United States) Avery Dreher	(Japan) Kawasaki
2024	(United States) Matthew Chapin	(Japan) Kawasaki
2025	(United States) Alessandro Di Mario	(Germany) Krämer
2026	(United States) Nathan Gouker	(Germany) Krämer

=== King Of The Baggers ===
Season	Rider	Manufacturer
2021	(United States) Kyle Wyman	(United States) Harley-Davidson
2022	(United States) Tyler O’Hara	(United States) Indian Motorcycle
2023	(United States) Hayden Gillim	(United States) Harley-Davidson
2024	(Australia) Troy Herfoss	(United States) Indian Motorcycle
2025	(United States) Kyle Wyman	(United States) Harley-Davidson
2026	(United States) Hayden Gillim	(United States) Indian Motorcycle
