= 2019 MotoAmerica Superbike Championship =

The 2019 MotoAmerica Superbike Championship season was the 43rd season of the premier class of circuit-based motorcycle racing in the United States and the 5th since its renaming to MotoAmerica. Cameron Beaubier entered the season as the defending champion, after taking his third title in 2018.

== Calendar and results ==
Round	Circuit	Date	Race 1 Winner	Race 2 Winner
1	(Georgia (U.S. state)) Road Atlanta	April 5–7	(United States) Cameron Beaubier	(Spain) Toni Elias
2	(Texas) Circuit of the Americas	April 12–14	(Spain) Toni Elias	(United States) Josh Herrin
3	Virginia International Raceway	May 3–5	(United States) Cameron Beaubier	(United States) JD Beach
4	(Wisconsin) Road America	May 31-June 2	(Spain) Toni Elias	(United States) Josh Herrin
5	Utah Motorsports Campus	June 14–16	(Spain) Toni Elias	(Spain) Toni Elias
6	(California) Laguna Seca	July 12–14	(Spain) Toni Elias	(United States) Garrett Gerloff
7	(California) Sonoma Raceway	August 9–11	(United States) Garrett Gerloff	(United States) Cameron Beaubier
8	(Pennsylvania) Pittsburgh International Race Complex	August 23–25	(United States) Garrett Gerloff	(Spain) Toni Elias
9	New Jersey Motorsports Park	September 6–8	(United States) Garrett Gerloff	(United States) Cameron Beaubier
10	(Alabama) Barber Motorsports Park	September 20–22	(United States) Cameron Beaubier	(United States) Cameron Beaubier

== Teams and riders ==
2020 Entry List
Team	Constructor	No.	Rider	Rounds
Ameris Bank/CCFOfficeSolutions.com	BMW	99	(United States) Geoff May	1
Attack Performance Estenson Racing Yamaha	Yamaha	95	(United States) JD Beach	All
Blysk Racing	BMW	14	(Canada) Samuel Trepanier	1, 3
Cycle Gear/SC Project/KWR Ducati	Ducati	33	(United States) Kyle Wyman	All
Ducati Richmond/KWR Ducati	Ducati	33	(United States) Kyle Wyman	All
FLY Racing	Yamaha	17	(United States) Sam Verderico	1, 2, 3, 4, 5, 6, 7, 8, 9
Fly Racing ADR Motorsports	Kawasaki	25	(United States) David Anthony	All
Fly Racing ADR Motorsports	Kawasaki	757	(United Kingdom) Bradley Ward	2
Fly Racing ADR Motorsports	Kawasaki	912	(United States) Brad Burns	10
KWR Ducati	Ducati	33	(United States) Kyle Wyman	All
M4 ECSTAR Suzuki	Suzuki	49	(United States) Felipe MacLean	2
M4 ECSTAR Suzuki	Suzuki	85	(United States) Jake Lewis	All
Maximum Effort Racing	Yamaha	47	(United States) Mathew Orange	5
Monster Energy/Yamalube/Yamaha Factory Racing	Yamaha	1	(United States) Cameron Beaubier	All
Monster Energy/Yamalube/Yamaha Factory Racing	Yamaha	31	(United States) Garrett Gerloff	All
Omega Moto	Yamaha	45	(United States) Cameron Petersen	All
Scheibe Racing	BMW	32	(United States) Jake Gagne	All
Speed Monkey Racing	BMW	42	(United States) Jeremy Coffey	5, 6, 7
Thrashed Bike Racing	Yamaha	88	(United Kingdom) Max Flinders	All
Uribe Racing	Honda	36	(United States) Jayson Uribe	5, 6
Weir Everywhere Racing	BMW	240	(United States) Travis Wyman	2, 6, 9, 10
Westby Racing	Yamaha	11	(South Africa) Mathew Scholtz	All
Yoshimura Suzuki Factory Racing	Suzuki	2	(United States) Josh Herrin	All
Yoshimura Suzuki Factory Racing	Suzuki	24	(Spain) Toni Elias	All

== Championship standings ==
=== Riders' championship ===
Scoring system

Points are awarded to the top fifteen finishers. A rider has to finish the race to earn points.

Position	1st	2nd	3rd	4th	5th	6th	7th	8th	9th	10th	11th	12th	13th	14th	15th
Points	25	20	16	13	11	10	9	8	7	6	5	4	3	2	1

Pos	Rider	Bike	RAT (Georgia (U.S. state))		TEX (Texas)		VIR (Virginia)		RAM (Wisconsin)		UMC (Utah)		MON (California)		SON (California)		PIT (Pennsylvania)		NJE (New Jersey)		BAR (Alabama)		Pts
Pos	Rider	Bike	R1	R2	R1	R2	R1	R2	R1	R2	R1	R2	R1	R2	R1	R2	R1	R2	R1	R2	R1	R2	Pts
1	(United States) Cameron Beaubier	Yamaha	1	3	2	3	1	Ret	2	2	4	2	3	3	Ret	1	2	2	2	1	1	1	367
2	(Spain) Toni Elias	Yamaha	2	1	1	2	2	3	1	Ret	1	1	1	2	2	Ret	3	1	4	4	3	4	362
3	(United States) Garrett Gerloff	Yamaha	Ret	9	3	4	3	2	3	3	3	3	2	1	1	2	1	Ret	1		2	2	316
4	(United States) JD Beach	Yamaha	3	4	5	Ret	4	1	7	4	Ret	5	4	5	4	5	6	6	3	2	5	Ret	226
5	(United States) Josh Herrin	Suzuki	Ret	5	4	1	Ret	7	4	1	6	4	Ret	4	Ret	3	7	3	7	7	4	7	213
6	(South Africa) Mathew Scholtz	Yamaha	4	2	7	13	Ret	4	5	5	2	DNS	Ret	6	3	4	5	5	5	3	Ret	3	204
7	(United States) Jake Lewis	Yamaha	7	6	6	5	5	5	10	8	5	6	5	8	Ret	11	11	4	6	5	12	8	172
8	(United States) Jake Gagne	BMW	8	Ret	DNS	DNS	6	Ret	8	7	7	7	Ret	7	5	6	4	7	8	8	6	Ret	131
9	(United States) Cameron Petersen	Yamaha	9	10	9	6	8	6	6	9	Ret	Ret	7	9	Ret	7	8	10	Ret	10	8	6	128
10	(United States) David Anthony	Kawasaki	5	7	8	8	7	9	9	DNS	9		6	Ret	Ret	8	Ret	9	10	9	9	9	118
11	(United States) Kyle Wyman	Ducati	6	Ret	10	7	9	10	Ret	6	13	12	Ret		Ret	Ret	Ret	8	9	6	7	5	100
12	(United Kingdom) Max Flinders	Yamaha	11	12	13	10	10	8	11	DNS	12	10	10	14	6	Ret	9	11	11	12	11	10	97
13	(United States) Sam Verderico	Yamaha	13	13	12	11	12	DNS	12	10	11	11	8	15	7	10	10	12	13				76
14	(United States) Travis Wyman	BMW			11	9								12					12	11	10	11	36
15	(United States) Jayson Uribe	Honda									8	8	Ret	10									22
16	(Canada) Samuel Trepanier	BMW	12	11			11	11															19
17	(United States) Jeremy Coffey	BMW									DNS	Ret	9	13	Ret	9							17
18	(United States) Geoff May	BMW	10	8																			14
19	(United States) Mathew Orange	Yamaha									10	9											13
20	(United States) Brad Burns	Yamaha																			13	12	7
21	(United States) Michael Gilbert	Yamaha												11									5
22	(United Kingdom) Bradley Ward	Yamaha			Ret	12																	4
23	(United States) Felipe MacLean	Suzuki			14	14																	4
Pos	Rider	Bike	RAT (Georgia (U.S. state))		TEX (Texas)		VIR (Virginia)		RAM (Wisconsin)		UMC (Utah)		MON (California)		SON (California)		PIT (Pennsylvania)		NJE (New Jersey)		BAR (Alabama)		Pts
