= 2026 MotoAmerica Superbike Championship =

50th running of the MotoAmerica Superbike Championship

The 2026 MotoAmerica Superbike Championship season was the 50th season of the premier class of production-based motorcycle road racing in the United States and the twelfth with current promoter Wayne Rainey and the KRAVE group (dba MotoAmerica). The Superbike season started on April 17 at Road Atlanta, and finished on September 27 at New Jersey Motorsports Park.

Cameron Beaubier was the defending champion, having claimed his 6th Superbike championship in the previous season.

== Calendar and results ==
The 2026 schedule was announced on September 18, 2025.

Round		Circuit	Date	Pole position	Fastest lap	Race winners
1	R1	(Georgia (U.S. state)) Road Atlanta, Georgia	April 17–19	(South Africa) Mathew Scholtz	(South Africa) Mathew Scholtz	(South Africa) Mathew Scholtz
1	R2	(Georgia (U.S. state)) Road Atlanta, Georgia	April 17–19		(South Africa) Mathew Scholtz	(United States) Bobby Fong
2	R1	Barber Motorsports Park, Alabama	May 15–17	(United States) Cameron Beaubier	(South Africa) Mathew Scholtz	(South Africa) Mathew Scholtz
2	R2	Barber Motorsports Park, Alabama	May 15–17		(South Africa) Mathew Scholtz	(South Africa) Mathew Scholtz
3	R1	Road America, Wisconsin	May 29–31	(United States) Cameron Beaubier	(United States) Cameron Petersen	(United States) Cameron Petersen
3	R2	Road America, Wisconsin	May 29–31		(United States) P. J. Jacobsen	(United States) Sean Dylan Kelly
4	R1	(Washington (state)) The Ridge Motorsports Park, Washington	June 26–28	(United States) P. J. Jacobsen	(United States) P. J. Jacobsen	(United States) J. D. Beach
4	R2	(Washington (state)) The Ridge Motorsports Park, Washington	June 26–28		(United States) Cameron Petersen	(United States) Sean Dylan Kelly
5	R1	WeatherTech Raceway Laguna Seca, Monterey, California	July 10–12	(United States) Cameron Petersen	(United States) J. D. Beach	(United States) J. D. Beach
5	R2	WeatherTech Raceway Laguna Seca, Monterey, California	July 10–12		(United States) J. D. Beach	(United States) J. D. Beach
6	R1	Mid-Ohio Sports Car Course, Ohio	July 31 – August 2	(United States) Benjamin Smith	(United States) Bobby Fong	(United States) Sean Dylan Kelly
6	R2	Mid-Ohio Sports Car Course, Ohio	July 31 – August 2		(United States) P. J. Jacobsen	(South Africa) Mathew Scholtz
7	R1	Virginia International Raceway, Virginia	August 14–16	(South Africa) Mathew Scholtz	(United States) Sean Dylan Kelly	(United States) Bobby Fong
7	R2	Virginia International Raceway, Virginia	August 14–16		(United States) J. D. Beach	(United States) Bobby Fong
7	R3	Virginia International Raceway, Virginia	August 14–16		(France) Loris Baz	(France) Loris Baz
8	R1	Circuit of the Americas, Texas	September 11–13			
8	R2	Circuit of the Americas, Texas	September 11–13			
9	R1	New Jersey Motorsports Park, New Jersey	September 25–27			
9	R2	New Jersey Motorsports Park, New Jersey	September 25–27			
9	R3	New Jersey Motorsports Park, New Jersey	September 25–27			

=== Confirmed schedule changes ===
- Road Atlanta was the opening round again for the first time since the 2024 season.
- Virginia International Raceway hosted the tripleheader round that was hosted at Laguna Seca in the previous season.

== Teams and riders ==
2026 Entry List
Team	Manufacturer	Motorcycle	No.	Rider		Rounds
Durbin Racing	BMW	M1000RR	625	(United States) Christopher Durbin	C	1–3
OrangeCat Racing	BMW	M1000RR	36	(United States) Jayson Uribe		1–3
OrangeCat Racing	BMW	M1000RR	40	(United States) Sean Dylan Kelly		1–3
Rahal Ducati Moto with XPEL	Ducati	Panigale V4 R	15	(United States) P. J. Jacobsen		1–3
Warhorse HSBK Ducati Flo4Law	Ducati	Panigale V4 R	1	(United States) Cameron Beaubier		1–3
Warhorse HSBK Ducati Flo4Law	Ducati	Panigale V4 R	78	(United States) Benjamin Smith		1–3
Wrench Motorcycles	Ducati	Panigale V4 R	45	(United States) Cameron Petersen		1–3
Jones Honda	Honda	CBR1000RR	16	(Canada) Alex Dumas		1–2
Jones Honda	Honda	CBR1000RR-R SP	46	(United States) Ashton Yates		3
Jones Honda	Honda	CBR1000RR-R SP	197	(United States) Ezra Beaubier	C	3
Jones Honda	Honda	CBR1000RR-R SP	199	(United States) Geoff May		2
Corrientes Racing Team	Honda	CBR1000RR-R SP	919	(Argentina) Emanuel Aguilar	C	1–2
Limitless Racing	Honda	CBR1000RR-R SP	84	(United States) Joseph Giannotto	C	1–3
Real Steel Motorsports	Honda	CBR1000RR-R SP	14	(United States) Andrew Lee	C	1–3
Real Steel Motorsports	Honda	CBR1000RR-R SP	69	(United States) Hayden Gillim		1–3
Real Steel Motorsports	Honda	CBR1000RR-R SP	72	(United States) Larry Pegram	C	3
Super Carl Racing	Honda	CBR1000RR-R SP	60	(United States) Carl Soltisz	C	1–3
Team Brazil	Honda	CBR1000RR-R SP	94	(Brazil) Danilo Lewis	C	1, 3
M4 ECSTAR Suzuki	Suzuki	GSX-R1000R	54	(Mexico) Richie Escalante		1–3
M4 ECSTAR Suzuki	Suzuki	GSX-R1000R	66	(United States) Brandon Paasch		1–3
Attack Performance Progressive Yamaha Racing	Yamaha	YZF-R1	50	(United States) Bobby Fong		1–3
Attack Performance Progressive Yamaha Racing	Yamaha	YZF-R1	95	(United States) J. D. Beach		1–3
BPR Racing	Yamaha	YZF-R1	194	(United States) Deion Campbell	C	1–3
Metronome Racing	Yamaha	YZF-R1	627	(United States) Matt Spinak	C	1
Strack Racing	Yamaha	YZF-R1	11	(South Africa) Mathew Scholtz		1–3
Superbike Supply	Yamaha	YZF-R1	90	(United States) Zachary Schumacher	C	1–3
Thrashed Bike Racing	Yamaha	YZF-R1	88	(United States) Max Flinders		1–3

Icon	Legend
C	Superbike Cup

=== Team changes ===
New teams/rebrands

- Warhorse HSBK Racing Ducati and FLO4LAW/SBU Racing merged to form Warhorse HSBK Ducati Flo4Law. The new team will add a second bike for this season.
- Orangecat Racing became an official BMW team, fielded two bikes for this season. The team had been operating in the former Stock 1000 series, and fielded two bikes in last season's SuperBike Championship round at VIR.
- Wrench Motorcycles will return to the series after a one-year hiatus.
- Strack Racing will join the Superbike championship for the first time.

=== Driver changes ===
Moving teams

- Defending champion Cameron Beaubier moved from Tytlers Cycle Racing to the newly formed Warhorse HSBK Ducati Flo4Law to pilot their second Ducati alongside Benjamin Smith.
- Sean Dylan Kelly signed with Orangecat Racing after leaving the Vision Wheel M4 ECSTAR Suzuki team.
- J. D. Beach returned to Attack Performance Progressive Yamaha Racing after leaving Real Steel Motorsports.

Moving between series

- Josh Herrin moved to the Supersport series to join Rahal Ducati Moto for 2026.
- Orangecat Racing announced that Jayson Uribe would remain on the team as they move up to the Superbike series.
- Cameron Petersen returns to the Superbike series from Supersport after signing with Wrench Motorcycles for the current season.
- Defending back-to-back Supersport champion Mathew Scholtz will return to the Superbike series with Strack Racing.
- Brandon Paasch rejoined the M4 ECSTAR Suzuki team after a year in the Supersport series, taking over the bike vacated by Sean Dylan Kelly.

== Championship standings ==
=== Scoring system ===
Points were awarded to the top fifteen finishers. A rider had to finish the race to earn points.

Position	1st	2nd	3rd	4th	5th	6th	7th	8th	9th	10th	11th	12th	13th	14th	15th
Points	25	20	16	13	11	10	9	8	7	6	5	4	3	2	1

=== Riders' championship ===
Pos	Rider	Bike	ATL (Georgia (U.S. state))		ALA (Alabama)		RAM (Wisconsin)		RID (Washington (state))	MON (California)	VIR (Virginia)	OHI (Ohio)	TEX (Texas)	NJE (New Jersey)	Pts
1	(United States) Sean Dylan Kelly	BMW	2	3	7	3	2	1							106
2	(South Africa) Mathew Scholtz	Yamaha	1^{PF}	2^{F}	1^{F}	1^{F}	6^{P}	Ret							105
3	(United States) Bobby Fong	Yamaha	DNS	1	4	6	3	3							80
4	(United States) J. D. Beach	Yamaha	Ret	4	3	2	5	4							73
5	(United States) Cameron Petersen	Ducati	4	6	DNS	5	1^{F}	5							70
6	(Mexico) Richie Escalante	Suzuki	6	10	5	4	DNS	7							49
7	(United States) Cameron Beaubier	Ducati	3	5	2^{P}	17	WD	WD							47
8	(United States) Brandon Paasch	Suzuki	7	8	8	8	DNS	9							40
9	(United States) Andrew Lee	Honda	8	13	9	7	9	10							40
10	(United States) P. J. Jacobsen	Ducati	DNQ	DNQ	Ret	11	4	2^{F}							38
11	(United States) Hayden Gillim	Honda	DNS	7	6	Ret	7	6							38
12	(United States) Jayson Uribe	BMW	5	11	12	16	8	8							36
13	(United States) Max Flinders	Yamaha	9	Ret	13	10	WD	DNS							16
14	(United States) Deion Campbell	Yamaha	DSQ	12	10	Ret	10	Ret							16
15	(United States) Carl Soltisz	Honda	12	17	15	12	13	14							14
16	(United States) Geoff May	Honda			11	9									12
17	(United States) Ashton Yates	Honda					11	11							10
18	(Argentina) Emanuel Aguilar	Honda	10	Ret	17	14									8
19	(Brazil) Danilo Lewis	Honda	DSQ	16			12	12							8
20	(United States) Benjamin Smith	Ducati	Ret	9	DNQ	DNQ	WD	WD							7
21	(Canada) Alex Dumas	Honda	Ret	14	14	13									7
22	(United States) Joseph Giannotto	Honda	11	Ret	16	Ret	17	Ret							5
23	(United States) Zachary Schumacher	Yamaha	13	18	DNS	15	16	16							4
24	(United States) Larry Pegram	Honda					Ret	13							3
25	(United States) Ezra Beaubier	Honda					14	15							3
26	(United States) Christopher Durbin	BMW	15	15	DNS	DNS	15	17							3
27	(United States) Matt Spinak	Yamaha	14	19											2
Pos	Rider	Bike	ATL (Georgia (U.S. state))		ALA (Alabama)		RAM (Wisconsin)		RID (Washington (state))	MON (California)	VIR (Virginia)	OHI (Ohio)	TEX (Texas)	NJE (New Jersey)	Pts

Colour	Result
Gold	Winner
Silver	Second place
Bronze	Third place
Green	Points classification
Blue	Non-points classification
Blue	Non-classified finish (NC)
Purple	Retired, not classified (Ret)
Red	Did not qualify (DNQ)
Red	Did not pre-qualify (DNPQ)
Black	Disqualified (DSQ)
White	Did not start (DNS)
White	Withdrew (WD)
White	Race cancelled (C)
Blank	Did not practice (DNP)
Blank	Did not arrive (DNA)
Blank	Excluded (EX)

P - Pole position
F - Fastest lap

=== Superbike Cup ===
Pos	Rider	Bike	ATL (Georgia (U.S. state))		ALA (Alabama)		RAM (Wisconsin)		RID (Washington (state))	MON (California)	VIR (Virginia)	OHI (Ohio)	TEX (Texas)	NJE (New Jersey)	Pts
1	(United States) Andrew Lee	Honda	8	13	9	7	9	10							145
2	(United States) Carl Soltisz	Honda	12	17	15	12	13	14							82
3	(United States) Deion Campbell	Yamaha	DSQ	12	10	Ret	10	Ret							65
4	(United States) Zachary Schumacher	Yamaha	13	18	DNS	15	16	16							50
5	(Canada) Alex Dumas	Honda	Ret	14	14	13									48
6	(Brazil) Danilo Lewis	Honda	DSQ	16			12	12							47
7	(Argentina) Emanuel Aguilar	Honda	10	Ret	17	14									43
8	(United States) Christopher Durbin	BMW	15	15	DNS	DNS	15	17							41
9	(United States) Joseph Giannotto	Honda	11	Ret	16	Ret	17	Ret							35
10	(United States) Ezra Beaubier	Honda					14	15							22
11	(United States) Matt Spinak	Yamaha	14	19											18
12	(United States) Larry Pegram	Honda					Ret	13							16
Pos	Rider	Bike	ATL (Georgia (U.S. state))		ALA (Alabama)		RAM (Wisconsin)		RID (Washington (state))	MON (California)	VIR (Virginia)	OHI (Ohio)	TEX (Texas)	NJE (New Jersey)	Pts
