= 2022 MotoAmerica Superbike Championship =

The 2022 MotoAmerica Superbike Championship season was the 46th season of the premier class of circuit-based motorcycle racing in the United States and the 8th since its renaming to MotoAmerica.

Jake Gagne entered the season as the defending champion, after taking his first title in 2021. His teammate for the 2021 season, Josh Herrin, left Attack Yamaha and joined Wahorse HSBK Racing NYC to campaign the Ducati Panigale V2 in the Supersport class under the newly adopted FIM Next-Generation Supersport regulations. Attack Yamaha replaced Herrin by recruiting Cameron Petersen away from Team M4 ECSTAR Suzuki. Additional changes to the MotoAmerica Superbike rider-lineup occurred when Loris Baz departed MotoAmerica to race for Bonovo BMW in World Superbike, allowing former-MotoGP rider, Danilo Petrucci, to reunite with Ducati by joining Warhorse HSBK Racing NYC for the 2022 MotoAmerica Superbike season.

== Calendar and results ==
Round	Circuit	Date	Race 1 Winner	Race 2 Winner	Attendance
	(Florida) Daytona International Speedway	March 10–12	No Superbike class	No Superbike class	
1	(Texas) Circuit of the Americas	April 8–10	(Italy) Danilo Petrucci	(Italy) Danilo Petrucci	
2	(Georgia (U.S. state)) Road Atlanta	April 22–24	(Italy) Danilo Petrucci	(United States) Jake Gagne	
3	Virginia	May 20–22	(United States) Jake Gagne	(United States) Jake Gagne	
4	(Wisconsin) Road America	June 3–5	(South Africa) Mathew Scholtz	(South Africa) Cameron Petersen	
5	(Washington (state)) The Ridge	June 24–26	(United States) Jake Gagne	(United States) Jake Gagne	
6	(California) Monterey	July 8–10	(United States) Jake Gagne	(United States) Jake Gagne	35,717
7	(Minnesota) Brainerd	July 29–31	(United States) Jake Gagne	(Italy) Danilo Petrucci	
8	(Pennsylvania) Pittsburgh	August 19–21	(United States) Jake Gagne	(United States) Jake Gagne	
9	New Jersey	September 9–11	(United States) Jake Gagne	(Italy) Danilo Petrucci	
10	Alabama	September 23–25	(United States) Jake Gagne	(South Africa) Cameron Petersen	

== Teams and riders ==
2022 Entry List
Team	Constructor	No.	Rider	Rounds
Fresh N Lean Progressive Yamaha Racing Team	Yamaha	1	(United States) Jake Gagne	1–8
Fresh N Lean Progressive Yamaha Racing Team	Yamaha	45	(South Africa) Cameron Petersen	1–8
Warhorse HSBK Racing Ducati New York	Ducati	9	(Italy) Danilo Petrucci	1–8
Tytlers Cycle/Ride HVMC Racing	BMW	10	(United States) Travis Wyman	1–8
Tytlers Cycle/Ride HVMC Racing	BMW	23	(United States) Corey Alexander	1–2, 4–8
Tytlers Cycle/Ride HVMC Racing	BMW	90	(United States) Zachary Schumacher	9
Westby Racing	Yamaha	11	(South Africa) Mathew Scholtz	1–8
Cycle World/Octane/Chuckwalla Racing	Suzuki	14	(United States) Andrew Lee	6–8
Team Posse/Aerojwalk	Ducati	15	(United States) Jeremiah Walker	1
Vision Wheel M4 ECSTAR Suzuki	Suzuki	19	(United States) Wyatt Farris	
Vision Wheel M4 ECSTAR Suzuki	Suzuki	33	(United States) Kyle Wyman	6
Vision Wheel M4 ECSTAR Suzuki	Suzuki	54	(Mexico) Richie Escalante	1–8
Vision Wheel M4 ECSTAR Suzuki	Suzuki	85	(United States) Jake Lewis	1–5, 7–8
Scheibe Racing	BMW	22	(United States) Ashton Yates	1–8
ADR Motorsports	Suzuki	25	(Australia) David Anthony	1–8
Legacy Dental/Poly Evolution	Yamaha	31	(United States) Jeffrey Purk	1–2, 4
Tytlers Cycle Racing	BMW	33	(United States) Kyle Wyman	2
Tytlers Cycle Racing	BMW	66	(United States) P. J. Jacobsen	1, 3–8
Tytlers Cycle Racing	BMW	73	(United States) Larry Pegram	4, 6
Tytlers Cycle Racing	BMW	80	(Spain) Héctor Barberá	1–8
4 Wheel Specialty Racing	BMW	38	(United States) Volga Mermut	5
Michael Gilbert Racing	Suzuki	55	(United States) Michael Gilbert	1–5
Disrupt Racing	Suzuki	69	(United States) Hayden Gillim	1–8
Flo4Law Racing	Yamaha	77	(United States) Bobby Davies	1
Thrashed Bike Racing	Yamaha	88	(United States) Max Flinders	1–8
Zlock Racing	Kawasaki	91	(United States) Kevin Pinkstaff	5
OC Racing	Yamaha	95	(United States) Mathew Cunha	1–2, 4, 7
VisionWheel.com/DiscountTire/KWS Motorsports	Honda	99	(United States) Geoff May	1–8
2022 Superbike Cup Entry List
Team	Constructor	No.	Rider	Rounds
Motorsport Exotica Orange Cat BST Racing	BMW	16	(United States) Ezra Beaubier	1–8
Hunter Dunham Racing	Yamaha	17	(United States) Hunter Dunham	1–8
Redline-Moto	Yamaha	18	(United States) Zachary Butler	4,8
Redline-Moto	Yamaha	43	(United States) Michael Butler	8
Red Lobo Racing	Kawasaki	20	(United States) Manuel Segura	7
Tom Wood Powersports	BMW	21	(United States) Nolan Lamkin	3–8
Schmotter Motion Racing	Yamaha	26	(United States) Jake Schmotter	7
EZ Racing	Kawasaki	27	(Mexico) Edgar Zaragoza	1
Wawa Racing Team	BMW	29	(United States) Jack Bakken	6
N2 Racing/BobbleHeadMoto	Yamaha	35	(United States) Emerson Amaya	8
Team Posse	Yamaha	40	(United States) Dallas Sherman Jr	6
PDR Motorsport	Kawasaki	41	(Uruguay) Maximiliano Gerardo	1–4
Triple M	Suzuki	42	(United States) Jeremy Coffey	1–8
Nielsen Racing	Kawasaki	44	(United States) Justin Miest	4, 7
CW Moto Racing	Yamaha	52	(United States) Sean Thomas	1
Crossbeam Builders/DiBrino Racing	Kawasaki	62	(United States) Andy DiBrino	3–7
3D Motorsports	Yamaha	68	(United States) Dustin Dominguez	7
3D Motorsports	Yamaha	72	(United Kingdom) Steven Shakespeare	1
Champ School BPR Yamaha	Yamaha	70	(United States) Bryce Prince	6
Synergy Audio Video	BMW	74	(United States) Aaron Risinger	4
CWMoto Racing	Yamaha	79	(United States) Eziah Davis	5
Farrell Performance	Kawasaki	86	(United States) Jason Farrell	4
Burke Racing	Yamaha	87	(United States) Ryan Burke	5, 7–8
Edge Racing	Honda	92	(United States) Jason Waters	3–4, 8
Edge Racing	Honda	93	(United States) Luie Zendejas	3
Tecfil Racing	BMW	94	(Brazil) Danilo Lewis	1–8
Altus Motorsports	Suzuki	96	(United States) Brandon Paasch	2–8
Luie Zendejas Racing	BMW	48	(United States) Joseph Giannotto	9

== Championship standings ==
=== Riders' championship ===
Scoring system

Points are awarded to the top fifteen finishers. A rider has to finish the race to earn points.

Position	1st	2nd	3rd	4th	5th	6th	7th	8th	9th	10th	11th	12th	13th	14th	15th
Points	25	20	16	13	11	10	9	8	7	6	5	4	3	2	1

Pos	Rider	Bike	TEX (Texas)		ATL (Georgia (U.S. state))		VIR (Virginia)		RAM (Wisconsin)		RID (Washington (state))		MON (California)		BRA (Minnesota)		PIT (Pennsylvania)		NJE (New Jersey)		ALA (Alabama)		Pts
1	(United States) Jake Gagne	Yamaha	DNS	3	Ret	1	1	1	5	4	1	1	1	1	1	Ret	1	1	1	3	1	2	376
2	(Italy) Danilo Petrucci	Ducati	1	1	1	Ret	4	3	2	3	3	2	3	2	3	1	2	3	4	1	3	4	356
3	(South Africa) Cameron Petersen	Yamaha	3	4	Ret	2	3	4	Ret	1	2	3	2	3	2	2	4	4	2	5	9	1	304
4	(South Africa) Mathew Scholtz	Yamaha	2	2	2	Ret	2	2	1	8	4	4	5	Ret	4	DNS	3	2	3	2	2	5	286
5	(Spain) Héctor Barberá	BMW	5	7	4	4	6	9	3	17	5	5	6	5	Ret	5	7	8	6	4	5	10	190
6	(United States) PJ Jacobsen	BMW	4	Ret			7	5	4	2	Ret	9	7	6	5	3	Ret	5	5	Ret	4	3	170
7	(United States) Jake Lewis	Suzuki	6	6	3	Ret	5	7	6	7	DNS	DNS			9	7	5	9	9	6	7	7	144
8	(United States) Hayden Gillim	Suzuki	13	8	8	Ret	9	12	Ret	14	8	7	Ret	11	6	4	6	7	7	7	6	8	132
9	(Mexico) Richie Escalante	Suzuki	7	5	5	5	Ret	6	7	15	10	6	4	4	DNS	DNS	Ret	6	Ret	13	Ret	6	127
10	(United States) Ashton Yates	BMW	12	12	9	7	8	8	10	6	6	Ret	Ret	13	7	6	9	10	8	Ret	11	11	119
11	(United States) Corey Alexander	BMW	10	13	7	6			8	DNS	7	8	Ret	9	8	DNS	8	Ret	Ret	Ret	8	DNS	84
12	(United States) Travis Wyman	BMW	9	9	10	8	10	10	11	Ret	11	Ret	10	8	11	DNS	Ret	11	10	Ret	DNS	13	83
13	(Australia) David Anthony	Suzuki	8	11	Ret	9	11	11	Ret	Ret	Ret	10	Ret	10	10	DNS	10	Ret	11	8	10	12	77
14	(United States) Kyle Wyman	BMW			6	3															13	9	53
14	(United States) Kyle Wyman	Suzuki											8	7									53
15	(United States) Brandon Paasch	Suzuki			13	Ret	14	16	DNS	13	15	14	14	14	13	9	11	12	14	10	14	15	45
16	(Brazil) Danilo Lewis	BMW	DNS	DNS	14	13	17	15	17	9	16	11	12	16	19	11	13	15	12	15	16	14	38
17	(United States) Max Flinders	Yamaha	Ret	16	15	12	13	Ret	14	16	14	13	15	17	Ret	Ret	12	Ret	Ret	11	12	20	29
18	(United States) Geoff May	Honda	11	15	Ret	10	12	Ret	12	Ret	DNS	DNS	Ret	18	Ret	12	Ret	13	Ret	DNS	15	Ret	28
19	(United States) Larry Pegram	BMW							9	5			11	12									27
20	(United States) Jeremy Coffey	Suzuki	15	17	17	Ret	16	18	21	11	DNS	12	17	21	14	10	DNS	DNS	16	9	17	DNS	25
21	(United States) Ezra Beaubier	BMW	14	14	12	Ret	Ret	13	DNS	19	13	DNS	13	15	12	Ret	Ret	Ret	13	Ret	Ret	17	25
22	(United States) Michael Gilbert	Suzuki	Ret	10	11	Ret	Ret	14	13	18	12	DNS											20
23	(United States) Hunter Dunham	Yamaha	16	18	16	14	Ret	17	15	20	19	15	18	22	16	13	14	16	15	12	18	19	14
24	(United States) Andy DiBrino	Kawasaki					DNS	Ret	16	12	9	Ret	DNS	Ret	Ret	DNS							11
25	(United States) Andrew Lee	Suzuki											16	19	Ret	8	Ret	14	Ret	Ret	19	16	10
26	(United States) Bryce Prince	Yamaha											9	20									7
27	(United States) Justin Miest	Kawasaki							23	10					17	16							6
28	(Uruguay) Maximiliano Gerardo	Kawasaki	DNS	DNS	DNS	11	DNS	DNS	DNS	DNS													5
29	(United States) Nolan Lamkin	BMW					15	19	Ret	21	DNS	DNS	19	23	18	15	DNS	DNS	17	14	Ret	18	4
30	(United States) Jake Schmotter	Yamaha													15	14							3
	(United States) Eziah Davis	Yamaha									DNS	17							Ret	16	Ret	Ret	0
	(United States) Kevin Pinkstaff	Kawasaki									17	16											0
	(United States) Mathew Cunha	Yamaha	Ret	Ret	Ret	Ret			19	DNS					DNS	17							0
	(United States) Zachary Schumacher	BMW																	19	17			0
	(Mexico) Edgar Zaragoza	Kawasaki	17	21																			0
	(United States) Jeffrey Purk	Yamaha	18	19	DNS	DNS			18	22													0
	(United States) Zachary Butler	Yamaha							20	DNS									18	DNS			0
	(United States) Volga Mermut	BMW									18	Ret											0
	(United States) Sean Thomas	Yamaha	19	20																			0
	(United States) Joseph Giannotto	BMW																			20	Ret	0
	(United States) Michael Butler	Yamaha																	20	DNS			0
	(United States) Jason Waters	Honda					DNS	DNS	22	DNS							DNS	DNS	Ret	DNS	Ret	Ret	0
	(United Kingdom) Steven Shakespeare	Yamaha	Ret	22																			0
	(United States) Jack Bakken	BMW											DNS	24									0
	(United States) Dallas Sherman Jr	Yamaha											DNS	25									0
	(United States) Aaron Risinger	BMW							Ret	Ret													0
	(United States) Jason Farrell	Kawasaki							Ret	DNS													0
	(United States) Ryan Burke	Yamaha									DNS	DNS			DNS	DNS	DNS	DNS	DNS	DNS			0
	(United States) Jeremiah Walker	Ducati	DNS	DNS																			0
	(United States) Bobby Davies	Yamaha	DNS	DNS																			0
	(United States) Luie Zendejas	Honda					DNS	DNS															0
	(United States) Manuel Segura	Kawasaki													DNS	DNS							0
	(United States) Dustin Dominguez	Yamaha													DNS	DNS							0
	(United States) Emerson Amaya	Yamaha															DNS	DNS					0
Pos	Rider	Bike	TEX (Texas)		ATL (Georgia (U.S. state))		VIR (Virginia)		RAM (Wisconsin)		RID (Washington (state))		MON (California)		BRA (Minnesota)		PIT (Pennsylvania)		NJE (New Jersey)		ALA (Alabama)		Pts

=== Superbike Cup ===
Pos	Rider	Bike	TEX (Texas)		ATL (Georgia (U.S. state))		VIR (Virginia)		RAM (Wisconsin)		RID (Washington (state))		MON (California)		BRA (Minnesota)		PIT (Pennsylvania)		NJE (New Jersey)		ALA (Alabama)		Pts
1	(Brazil) Danilo Lewis	BMW	DNS	DNS	3	2	4	2	3	1	4	1	2	3	8	3	2	2	1	5	2	1	329
2	(United States) Brandon Paasch	Suzuki			2	Ret	1	3	DNS	5	3	3	4	1	2	1	1	1	3	2	1	2	318
3	(United States) Hunter Dunham	Yamaha	3	3	4	3	Ret	4	1	7	5	4	6	6	5	4	3	3	4	3	4	5	261
4	(United States) Jeremy Coffey	Suzuki	2	2	5	Ret	3	5	5	3	DNS	2	5	5	3	2	DNS	DNS	5	1	3	Ret	235
5	(United States) Ezra Beaubier	BMW	1	1	1	Ret	Ret	1	DNS	6	2	DNS	3	2	1	Ret	Ret	Ret	2	Ret	Ret	3	227
6	(United States) Nolan Lamkin	BMW					2	6	Ret	8	DNS	DNS	7	7	7	6	DNS	DNS	6	4	Ret	4	111
7	(United States) Andy DiBrino	Kawasaki					DNS	Ret	2	4	1	Ret	DNS	Ret	Ret	DNS							58
8	(United States) Justin Miest	Kawasaki							7	2					6	7							48
9	(United States) Bryce Prince	Yamaha											1	4									38
10	(Uruguay) Maximiliano Gerardo	Kawasaki	DNS	DNS	DNS	1	DNS	DNS	DNS	DNS													25
11	(United States) Jake Schmotter	Yamaha													4	5							24
12	(United States) Sean Thomas	Yamaha	5	4																			24
13	(Mexico) Edgar Zaragoza	Kawasaki	4	5																			24
14	(United States) Zachary Butler	Yamaha							4	DNS									7	Ret			22
15	(United States) Eziah Davis	Yamaha									DNS	5							Ret	5			21
16	(United States) Zachary Schumacher	BMW																	8	7			17
17	(United States) Joseph Giannotto	BMW																			5	Ret	11
18	(United States) Jason Waters	Honda					DNS	DNS	6	DNS							DNS	DNS	Ret	DNS	Ret	Ret	10
19	(United Kingdom) Steven Shakespeare	Yamaha	Ret	6																			10
20	(United States) Jack Bakken	BMW											DNS	8									8
21	(United States) Michael Butler	Yamaha																	9	Ret			7
22	(United States) Dallas Sherman Jr	Yamaha											DNS	9									7
	(United States) Ryan Burke	Yamaha									DNS	DNS			DNS	DNS	DNS	DNS	DNS	DNS	DNS	DNS	0
	(United States) Emerson Amaya	Yamaha															DNS	DNS					0
	(United States) Manuel Segura	Kawasaki													DNS	DNS							0
	(United States) Dustin Dominguez	Yamaha													DNS	DNS							0
	(United States) Jason Farrell	Kawasaki							Ret	DNS													0
	(United States) Aaron Risinger	BMW							Ret	Ret													0
	(United States) Luie Zendejas	Honda					DNS	DNS															0
Pos	Rider	Bike	TEX (Texas)		ATL (Georgia (U.S. state))		VIR (Virginia)		RAM (Wisconsin)		RID (Washington (state))		MON (California)		BRA (Minnesota)		PIT (Pennsylvania)		NJE (New Jersey)		ALA (Alabama)		Pts
