= 2025 MotoAmerica Supersport Championship =

Motorcycle racing championship

The 2025 MotoAmerica Supersport Championship season was the eleventh season of the MotoAmerica Supersport class. The Superbike season started on April 4 at Barber Motorsports Park on April 4, finished on September 28 at New Jersey Motorsports Park.

Mathew Scholtz of Strack Racing is the defending champion.

== Calendar and Results ==
The 2025 schedule was announced on September 10, 2024.

Round		Circuit	Date	Pole position	Fastest lap	Race winners
1	R1	Barber Motorsports Park, Alabama	April 4–6	(South Africa) Mathew Scholtz	(South Africa) Mathew Scholtz	(South Africa) Mathew Scholtz
1	R2	Barber Motorsports Park, Alabama	April 4–6		(South Africa) Mathew Scholtz	(United States) Josh Hayes
2	R1	(Georgia (U.S. state)) Road Atlanta, Georgia	May 2–4	(South Africa) Mathew Scholtz	(United States) P. J. Jacobsen	(United States) P. J. Jacobsen
2	R2	(Georgia (U.S. state)) Road Atlanta, Georgia	May 2–4		(South Africa) Mathew Scholtz	(South Africa) Mathew Scholtz
3	R1	Road America, Wisconsin	May 30 – June 1	(United States) Tyler Scott	(United States) Tyler Scott	(United States) P. J. Jacobsen
3	R2	Road America, Wisconsin	May 30 – June 1		(United States) Tyler Scott	(United States) Blake Davis
4	R1	(Washington (state)) The Ridge Motorsports Park, Washington	June 27–29	(South Africa) Mathew Scholtz	(United States) Tyler Scott	(South Africa) Mathew Scholtz
4	R2	(Washington (state)) The Ridge Motorsports Park, Washington	June 27–29		(South Africa) Mathew Scholtz	(South Africa) Mathew Scholtz
5	R1	WeatherTech Raceway Laguna Seca, Monterey, California	July 11–13	(United States) P. J. Jacobsen	(United States) Cameron Petersen	(United States) Blake Davis
5	R2	WeatherTech Raceway Laguna Seca, Monterey, California	July 11–13		(South Africa) Mathew Scholtz	(United States) Blake Davis
6	R1	Virginia International Raceway, Virginia	August 1–3	(South Africa) Mathew Scholtz	(United States) P. J. Jacobsen	(South Africa) Mathew Scholtz
6	R2	Virginia International Raceway, Virginia	August 1–3		(South Africa) Mathew Scholtz	(South Africa) Mathew Scholtz
7	R1	Mid-Ohio Sports Car Course, Ohio	August 15–17	(United States) P. J. Jacobsen	(United States) P. J. Jacobsen	(United States) P. J. Jacobsen
7	R2	Mid-Ohio Sports Car Course, Ohio	August 15–17		(United States) Cameron Petersen	(South Africa) Mathew Scholtz
8	R1	Circuit of the Americas, Texas	September 12–14	(South Africa) Mathew Scholtz	(South Africa) Mathew Scholtz	(South Africa) Mathew Scholtz
8	R2	Circuit of the Americas, Texas	September 12–14		(South Africa) Mathew Scholtz	(South Africa) Mathew Scholtz
9	R1	New Jersey Motorsports Park, New Jersey	September 26–28	(South Africa) Mathew Scholtz	(South Africa) Mathew Scholtz	(South Africa) Mathew Scholtz
9	R2	New Jersey Motorsports Park, New Jersey	September 26–28		(South Africa) Mathew Scholtz	(South Africa) Mathew Scholtz

== Teams and riders ==
2025 Entry List
Manufacturer	Team	No.	Rider	Rounds
Ducati	Celtic/Economy Lube+Tire/Warhorse HSBK Ducati	27	(United States) Alessandro Di Mario	4
Ducati	Celtic/Economy Lube+Tire/Warhorse HSBK Ducati	45	(United States) Cameron Petersen	All
Ducati	Celtic/Economy Lube+Tire/Warhorse HSBK Ducati	272	(United States) Wristin Grigg	6, 8–9
Ducati	Chase Black Racing	14	(United States) Chase Black	2, 5–8
Ducati	HONOS Racing	711	(Mexico) Jorge Ehrenstein	8
Ducati	JBJR Racing	16	(United States) Jeff Bean	1–3, 5–6
Ducati	Rahal Ducati Moto w/ XPEL	15	(United States) P. J. Jacobsen	All
Ducati	Rahal Ducati Moto w/ XPEL	19	(United States) Kayla Yaakov	All
Ducati	Rahal Ducati Moto w/ Roller Die	23	(United States) Corey Alexander	All
Ducati	Rodio Racing	113	(United States) Gus Rodio	1, 9
Ducati	Team JBR	918	(United States) Josef Bittner	2–3
Ducati	Zinc AL 32	132	(Colombia) Alfonso Linares	8
MV Agusta	MP13 Racing	98	(United States) Aiden Sneed	All
Kawasaki	Chunga Racing	161	(Mexico) Victor Perez de Leon	1–3, 6–8
Kawasaki	CW Moto Racing	311	(United Kingdom) Lucca Allen	2, 4
Kawasaki	Jansen Racing	196	(United States) Jake Jansen	3
Kawasaki	Reded Racing	186	(Brazil) Rodrigo Donde	9
Kawasaki	TEK Moto, Turn 3 Racing	120	(United States) Alex Ricci	5
Suzuki	3D Motorsports	12	(United States) Alexander Enriquez	All
Suzuki	3D Motorsports	74	(United States) Gabriel Da Silva	5–6, 8–9
Suzuki	3D Motorsports	96	(United States) Brandon Paasch	7–9
Suzuki	ADR Motorsports	25	(Australia) David Anthony	1–5, 8
Suzuki	Altus Motorsports	13	(United States) Owen Williams	All
Suzuki	Altus Motorsports	71	(Canada) Torin Collins	All
Suzuki	Coatzymoto LatinWE Powered by Team Hammer	36	(Colombia) Martín Cárdenas	8
Suzuki	Cycle Pros Racing	18	(United States) Jake Vandal	3, 8
Suzuki	DT Racing	638	(United States) Jordan Tropkoff	6
Suzuki	Horney Racing	440	(United States) Kevin Horney	1–3, 6–9
Suzuki	LaRoche Tree Service	20	(United States) C. J. LaRoche	1, 7
Suzuki	LaRoche Tree Service	692	(United States) Joel Ohman	All
Suzuki	Monk Moto	111	(United States) Logan Monk	1–3, 6–9
Suzuki	S&S Racing – Capelle Bros & Diedrich	151	(United States) Hayden Diedrich	7–8
Suzuki	Spark's Racing	275	(United States) Robert Noe	7
Suzuki	Super Carl Racing	60	(United States) Carl Soltisz	2–3
Suzuki	Team Hammer	72	(United States) Larry Pegram	3, 7
Suzuki	Vesrah Racing	30	(Japan) Ryota Ogiwara	4
Suzuki	Vision Wheel M4 ECSTAR Suzuki	48	(United States) Max VanDenBrouck	All
Suzuki	Vision Wheel M4 ECSTAR Suzuki	70	(United States) Tyler Scott	All
Yamaha	Altus Motorsports	41	(Uruguay) Maximiliano Gerardo	5
Yamaha	Altus Motorsports	59	(United States) Jaret Nassaney	1–4, 6–9
Yamaha	Altus Motorsports	85	(New Zealand) Jake Lewis	1–4, 6, 8–9
Yamaha	Altus Motorsports	99	(United Kingdom) Jeremy McWilliams	7
Yamaha	Bauce BARTCON Racing	641	(United States) Joseph LiMandri Jr.	6, 9
Yamaha	BPR Racing Yamaha	4	(United States) Josh Hayes	All
Yamaha	BPR Racing Yamaha	79	(United States) Teagg Hobbs	1–5, 7–9
Yamaha	Donut Racing	56	(United States) Grant Cowan	5
Yamaha	EZ Racing	127	(Mexico) Edgar Zaragoza	5–6, 8–9
Yamaha	Mosites Motorsports/Ducati Pittsburgh	555	(United States) Ryder Davis	9
Yamaha	New York Safety Track	39	(United States) Yandel Medina	9
Yamaha	Shane Maggs Racing	129	(United States) Shane Maggs	All
Yamaha	Strack Racing	1	(South Africa) Mathew Scholtz	All
Yamaha	Strack Racing	22	(United States) Blake Davis	All
Yamaha	Team Velocity Racing	131	(United States) Chuck Ivey	2

== Championship standings ==
=== Scoring system ===
Points are awarded to the top fifteen finishers. A rider has to finish the race to earn points.

Position	1st	2nd	3rd	4th	5th	6th	7th	8th	9th	10th	11th	12th	13th	14th	15th
Points	25	20	16	13	11	10	9	8	7	6	5	4	3	2	1

=== Riders' championship ===
Pos	Rider	Bike	ALA (Alabama)		ATL (Georgia (U.S. state))		RAM (Wisconsin)		RID (Washington (state))		MON (California)		VIR (Virginia)		OHI (Ohio)		TEX (Texas)		NJE (New Jersey)		Pts
1	(South Africa) Mathew Scholtz	Yamaha	1^{F}	3^{F}	5	1^{F}	3	4	1^{P}	1^{F}	2	3^{F}	1^{P}	1^{F}	3	1	1^{PF}	1	1^{PF}	1	383
2	(United States) P. J. Jacobsen	Ducati	2	2	1^{F}	2	1	3	2	2	3^{P}	4	2^{F}	2	1^{PF}	3	3	2	Ret	4	325
3	(United States) Blake Davis	Yamaha	3	4	8	3	18	1	4	3	1	1	4	3	4	5	2	28	2	3	266
4	(United States) Tyler Scott	Suzuki	4	9	3	4	2^{PF}	5^{F}	6^{F}	6	9	Ret	6	4	5	4	4	5	4	2	211
5	(United States) Cameron Petersen	Ducati	7^{P}	WD	4	5	5	2	3	Ret	4^{F}	2	3	18	2	2^{F}	Ret	3	3	Ret	201
6	(United States) Kayla Yaakov	Ducati	5	7	6	9	4	6	5	Ret	10	5	7	5	6	6	5	4	5	Ret	163
7	(United States) Josh Hayes	Yamaha	10	1	9	7	10	15	9	Ret	8	8	5	6	7	7	Ret	9	6	6	143
8	(New Zealand) Jake Lewis	Yamaha	8	6	2	6	7	7	7	9			9	DNS			26	Ret	9	9	103
9	(Canada) Torin Collins	Suzuki	12	Ret	13	8	8	10	13	7	14	10	12	8	11	13	6	7	Ret	10	94
10	(United States) Aiden Sneed	MV Agusta	Ret	12	10	11	11	13	12	15	7	7	13	10	9	10	8	6	12	12	94
11	(United States) Corey Alexander	Ducati	6	Ret	DNS	WD	13	DNS	10	5	6	Ret	8	7	10	12	11	10	10	8	92
12	(United States) Teagg Hobbs	Yamaha	13	8	16	Ret	6	12	8	4	15	9			12	9	10	16	11	11	81
13	(United States) Max VanDenBrouck	Suzuki	11	5	7	Ret	Ret	14	16	11	12	Ret	10	11	13	11	Ret	17	15	15	57
14	(Australia) David Anthony	Suzuki	9	Ret	12	10	9	8	11	Ret	13	12					12	15			49
15	(United States) Brandon Paasch	Suzuki													15	8	7	8	7	5	46
16	(United States) Alexander Enriquez	Suzuki	15	Ret	11	12	14	11	Ret	10	11	11	15	Ret	14	14	16	Ret	17	17	38
17	(United States) Jaret Nassaney	Yamaha	16	10	Ret	14	17	16	17	13			16	15	16	15	Ret	14	8	14	25
18	(Uruguay) Maximiliano Gerardo	Yamaha									5	6									21
19	(United States) Joseph LiMandri Jr.	Yamaha											11	9					Ret	7	21
20	(United States) Larry Pegram	Suzuki					12	9							8	Ret					19
21	(United States) Owen Williams	Suzuki	14	11	23	Ret	16	18	15	12	16	13	17	12	20	16	Ret	20	18	19	19
22	(United States) Gabriel Da Silva	Suzuki									18	Ret	14	13			14	12	14	16	13
23	(Colombia) Martín Cárdenas	Suzuki															9	11			12
24	(Japan) Ryota Ogiwara	Suzuki							14	8											10
25	(United States) Chase Black	Ducati			18	13					17	14	Ret	14	17	18	17	18			7
26	(Mexico) Victor Perez de Leon	Kawasaki	20	15	24	17	20	25					22	17	22	19	15	13			5
27	(United States) Joel Ohman	Suzuki	19	13	20	19	21	20	18	14	Ret	16	20	20	27	24	22	22	21	24	5
28	(United Kingdom) Lucca Allen	Kawasaki	Ret	14	14	Ret			Ret	DNS											4
29	(United States) Yandel Medina	Yamaha																	13	Ret	3
30	(United States) Gus Rodio	Ducati	Ret	WD															DNS	13	3
31	(Colombia) Alfonso Linares	Ducati															13	21			3
32	(United States) Carl Soltisz	Suzuki			15	Ret	15	17													2
33	(Australia) Shane Maggs	Yamaha	22	16	19	18	24	22	Ret	16	19	15	Ret	16	24	21	23	25	22	20	1
34	(United States) Kevin Horney	Suzuki	18	Ret	17	15	19	19					Ret	23	23	WD	20	DSQ	23	23	1
35	(United States) Ryder Davis	Yamaha																	Ret	Ret	0
36	(United Kingdom) Jeremy McWilliams	Yamaha													18	Ret					0
37	(United States) Alessandro Di Mario	Ducati							DNS	WD											0
38	(United States) Jake Jansen	Kawasaki					Ret	DNS													0
39	(United States) Grant Cowan	Yamaha									Ret	17									0
40	(United States) Wristin Grigg	Ducati											18	WD			18	19	16	18	0
41	(United States) Alex Ricci	Kawasaki									Ret	19									0
39	(United States) C. J. LaRoche	Suzuki	17	Ret											19	20					0
43	(United States) Chuck Ivey	Yamaha			21	20															0
44	(Mexico) Edgar Zaragoza	Yamaha									21	20	21	22			25	23	20	21	0
45	(United States) Jeff Bean	Ducati	WD	WD	WD	WD	26	24			20	18	23	21							0
46	(United States) Logan Monk	Suzuki	21	DNS	25	16	23	DNS					19	19	21	17	19	Ret	19	22	0
47	(United States) Robert Noe	Suzuki													25	23					0
48	(United States) Josef Bittner	Ducati			22	21	25	23													0
49	(United States) Hayden Diedrich	Suzuki													26	22	21	24			0
50	(United States) Jordan Tropkoff	Suzuki											24	24							0
51	(Brazil) Rodrigo Donde	Kawasaki																	24	25	0
52	(Mexico) Jorge Ehrenstein	Ducati															24	26			0
53	(United States) Jake Vandal	Suzuki					22	21									27	27			0
Pos	Rider	Bike	ALA (Alabama)		ATL (Georgia (U.S. state))		RAM (Wisconsin)		RID (Washington (state))		MON (California)		VIR (Virginia)		OHI (Ohio)		TEX (Texas)		NJE (New Jersey)		Pts

Colour	Result
Gold	Winner
Silver	Second place
Bronze	Third place
Green	Points classification
Blue	Non-points classification
Blue	Non-classified finish (NC)
Purple	Retired, not classified (Ret)
Red	Did not qualify (DNQ)
Red	Did not pre-qualify (DNPQ)
Black	Disqualified (DSQ)
White	Did not start (DNS)
White	Withdrew (WD)
White	Race cancelled (C)
Blank	Did not practice (DNP)
Blank	Did not arrive (DNA)
Blank	Excluded (EX)

P - Pole position
F - Fastest lap
