= 2023 MotoAmerica Superbike Championship =

The 2023 MotoAmerica Superbike Championship season was the 47th season of the premier class of circuit-based motorcycle racing in the United States and the ninth with current promoter Wayne Rainey and the KRAVE group (dba MotoAmerica).

== Calendar and results ==
The calendar featured 9 rounds of 2 races each. Additionally, 2 rounds, Laguna Seca and Pittsburgh, had a third race.

| Round | Circuit | Date | Race 1 Winner | Race 2 Winner | Race 3 Winner | Attendance |
|---|---|---|---|---|---|---|
| | (Florida) Daytona International Speedway | March 9–11 | No Superbike class | | | |
| 1 | (Georgia (U.S. state)) Road Atlanta, Georgia | April 21–23 | (United States) Cameron Beaubier | (United States) Jake Gagne | Not held | 24,692 |
| 2 | Barber Motorsports Park, Alabama | May 19–21 | (United States) Jake Gagne | (United States) Jake Gagne | Not held | |
| 3 | Road America, Wisconsin | June 2–4 | (United States) Cameron Beaubier | (United States) Josh Herrin | Not held | 41,081 |
| 4 | (Washington (state)) The Ridge Motorsports Park, Washington | June 23–25 | (United States) Jake Gagne | (United States) Cameron Beaubier | Not held | |
| 5 | WeatherTech Raceway Laguna Seca, Monterey, California | July 7–9 | (United States) Jake Gagne | (United States) Cameron Beaubier | (United States) Cameron Beaubier | |
| 6 | Brainerd International Raceway, Minnesota | July 28–30 | (United States) Jake Gagne | (United States) P. J. Jacobsen | Not held | |
| 7 | Pittsburgh International Race Complex, Pennsylvania | August 18–20 | (United States) Jake Gagne | (United States) Jake Gagne | (United States) Jake Gagne | |
| 8 | Circuit of the Americas, Texas | September 8–10 | (United States) Jake Gagne | (United States) Josh Herrin | Not held | |
| 9 | New Jersey Motorsports Park, New Jersey | September 22–24 | (United States) Jake Gagne | (United States) J. D. Beach | Not held | |

== Teams and riders ==
2023 Entry List
| Team | Constructor | No. | Rider | | Rounds |
|---|---|---|---|---|---|
| Fresh N Lean Progressive Yamaha | Yamaha | 1 | (United States) Jake Gagne | | All |
| Fresh N Lean Progressive Yamaha | Yamaha | 4 | (United States) Josh Hayes | | 6 |
| Fresh N Lean Progressive Yamaha | Yamaha | 45 | (South Africa) Cameron Petersen | | 1–5 |
| Fresh N Lean Progressive Yamaha | Yamaha | 95 | (United States) J. D. Beach | | 7–9 |
| Warhorse HSBK Ducati NYC | Ducati | 2 | (United States) Josh Herrin | | All |
| Tytlers Cycle Racing | BMW | 6 | (United States) Cameron Beaubier | | 1–7 |
| Tytlers Cycle Racing | BMW | 23 | (United States) Corey Alexander | | All |
| Tytlers Cycle Racing | BMW | 37 | (United States) Stefano Mesa | | 8–9 |
| Tytlers Cycle Racing | BMW | 99 | (United States) P. J. Jacobsen | | All |
| Travis Wyman Racing | BMW | 10 | (United States) Travis Wyman | | 2 |
| Westby Racing LLC | Yamaha | 11 | (South Africa) Mathew Scholtz | | 2–9 |
| Aerojwalk Team | Ducati | 15 | (United States) Jeremiah Walker | C | 8 |
| Redline-Moto | Yamaha | 18 | (United States) Zachary Butler | C | 2–3, 8 |
| Red Lobo Racing | Suzuki | 20 | (United States) Manuel Segura | C | 2–3, 8 |
| Tom Wood Powersports | BMW | 21 | (United States) Nolan Lamkin | C | 1–5, 7–9 |
| Aftercare Scheibe Racing | BMW | 22 | (United States) Ashton Yates | | All |
| Vision Wheel M4 ECSTAR Suzuki | Suzuki | 24 | (Spain) Toni Elías | | 1–3 |
| Vision Wheel M4 ECSTAR Suzuki | Suzuki | 44 | (United States) Taylor Knapp | | 4 |
| Vision Wheel M4 ECSTAR Suzuki | Suzuki | 54 | (Mexico) Richie Escalante | | All |
| Vision Wheel M4 ECSTAR Suzuki | Suzuki | 96 | (United States) Brandon Paasch | | 5–9 |
| Wrench Motorcycles | Yamaha | 25 | (Australia) David Anthony | | 1–3 |
| Wrench Motorcycles | Yamaha | 50 | (United States) Bobby Fong | | 4–9 |
| Burke Racing | Yamaha | 27 | (United States) Ryan Burke | C | 2 |
| Schmotter Motion Racing | Yamaha | 36 | (United States) Jake Schmotter | C | 6 |
| 4 Wheel Specialty | BMW | 38 | (United States) Volga Mermut | | 4 |
| Nielsen Racing | Kawasaki | 47 | (United States) Justin Miest | C | 3, 6, 8 |
| Limitless Racing | Kawasaki | 48 | (United States) Joseph Giannotto | C | 1–3, 7–8 |
| Republic US Ecology/Zlock Racing | Kawasaki | 57 | (United States) Kevin Pinkstaff | | 4 |
| Disrupt Racing | Suzuki | 69 | (United States) Hayden Gillim | | All |
| Da Silva Racing | Yamaha | 71 | (United States) Gabriel Da Silva | C | 2–3 |
| Steel Commander Racing Team | Kawasaki | 71 | (United States) Gabriel Da Silva | C | 5, 7–9 |
| Flo4Law Racing | Yamaha | 77 | (United States) Bobby Davies | C | 8 |
| Flo4Law Racing | Kawasaki | 91 | (United States) J. C. Camacho | C | 2, 8 |
| CW Moto Racing | Yamaha | 78 | (United States) Benjamin Smith | | 1–4 |
| Benjamin Smith Racing | Yamaha | 78 | (United States) Benjamin Smith | | 7, 9 |
| Thrashed Bike Racing | Yamaha | 88 | (United States) Max Flinders | | All |
| Top Pro Motorsports | BMW | 89 | (United States) Alex Arango | | 8–9 |
| Schumacher Racing | Yamaha | 90 | (United States) Zachary Schumacher | C | 3, 8 |
| Edge Racing | BMW | 92 | (United States) Jason Waters | C | 1–2 |
| Team Brazil | BMW | 94 | (Brazil) Danilo Lewis | | 2–5, 7–9 |

C : Superbike Cup entries

== Championship standings ==
=== Scoring system ===
Points are awarded to the top fifteen finishers. A rider has to finish the race to earn points.

| Position | 1st | 2nd | 3rd | 4th | 5th | 6th | 7th | 8th | 9th | 10th | 11th | 12th | 13th | 14th | 15th |
| Points | 25 | 20 | 16 | 13 | 11 | 10 | 9 | 8 | 7 | 6 | 5 | 4 | 3 | 2 | 1 |

=== Riders' championship ===
| Pos | Rider | Bike | ATL (Georgia (U.S. state)) | | ALA (Alabama) | | RAM (Wisconsin) | | RID (Washington (state)) | | MON (California) | | | BRA (Minnesota) | | PIT (Pennsylvania) | | | TEX (Texas) | | NJE (New Jersey) | | Pts |
|---|---|---|---|---|---|---|---|---|---|---|---|---|---|---|---|---|---|---|---|---|---|---|---|
| 1 | (United States) Jake Gagne | Yamaha | 2 | 1 | 1 | 1 | Ret | 3 | 1 | 2 | 1 | 2 | 3 | 1 | 2 | 1 | 1 | 1 | 1 | DSQ | 1 | 4 | 420 |
| 2 | (United States) Josh Herrin | Ducati | 3 | 4 | 6 | 6 | 3 | 1 | 3 | 3 | 2 | 3 | 2 | 3 | Ret | 6 | 3 | 3 | Ret | 1 | 5 | Ret | 272 |
| 3 | (United States) P. J. Jacobsen | BMW | Ret | 6 | 5 | 5 | 2 | 2 | 6 | 7 | 3 | Ret | 6 | 2 | 1 | 5 | 2 | 5 | 4 | 2 | 4 | 2 | 266 |
| 4 | (South Africa) Mathew Scholtz | Yamaha | 5 | 3 | 3 | 2 | 8 | 6 | 3 | Ret | Ret | 6 | 8 | DNS | 3 | 3 | 4 | 2 | 5 | Ret | 6 | Ret | 205 |
| 5 | (Mexico) Richie Escalante | Suzuki | 6 | 5 | 7 | 4 | 4 | 8 | 5 | 4 | 4 | 4 | 4 | 5 | 7 | 8 | 14 | 4 | 2 | 15 | 11 | 6 | 203 |
| 6 | (United States) Cameron Beaubier | BMW | 1 | 2 | 4 | 3 | 1 | Ret | 7 | 1 | DNS | 1 | 1 | Ret | DNS | 2 | Ret | DNS | | | | | 203 |
| 7 | (United States) Corey Alexander | BMW | 8 | 7 | 9 | 7 | 7 | 7 | 4 | 5 | 8 | 7 | 9 | Ret | Ret | 12 | 8 | DNS | 6 | 7 | 3 | 3 | 161 |
| 8 | (United States) Hayden Gillim | Suzuki | 10 | 10 | 10 | 10 | 10 | 10 | 8 | 8 | 7 | 9 | 10 | 7 | 6 | 10 | 7 | 7 | Ret | DNS | 8 | Ret | 125 |
| 9 | (United States) Ashton Yates | BMW | DNS | 9 | 8 | 8 | 9 | 9 | 9 | Ret | 10 | 11 | 12 | 9 | 9 | 11 | 13 | DNS | 8 | 5 | Ret | 9 | 106 |
| 10 | (United States) Max Flinders | Yamaha | 11 | 11 | 13 | Ret | 15 | 11 | 10 | 9 | 9 | 10 | 11 | 10 | 10 | 15 | 11 | 12 | 10 | 9 | 14 | 10 | 92 |
| 11 | (United States) J. D. Beach | Yamaha | | | | | | | | | | | | | | 7 | 5 | 4 | 3 | Ret | 2 | 1 | 91 |
| 12 | (South Africa) Cameron Petersen | Yamaha | 4 | Ret | 2 | Ret | 5 | 4 | 17 | 6 | Ret | 5 | 5 | | | | | | | | | | 89 |
| 13 | (United States) Bobby Fong | Yamaha | | | | | | | DSQ | Ret | 6 | Ret | DNS | 6 | 4 | 4 | Ret | 8 | 7 | 3 | 13 | 8 | 87 |
| 14 | (United States) Brandon Paasch | Suzuki | | | | | | | | | 5 | 8 | 7 | 8 | 5 | 9 | 6 | Ret | Ret | 4 | Ret | 5 | 86 |
| 15 | (United States) Nolan Lamkin | BMW | 12 | 15 | 16 | 14 | Ret | DNS | 12 | Ret | 12 | 13 | 13 | 12 | 11 | 14 | Ret | 10 | 13 | 10 | 9 | 12 | 57 |
| 16 | (Spain) Toni Elías | Suzuki | 7 | 8 | 12 | 9 | 6 | 5 | | | | | | | | | | | | | | | 49 |
| 17 | (Brazil) Danilo Lewis | BMW | | | Ret | Ret | 13 | 12 | 14 | 11 | Ret | Ret | 14 | | | 17 | 12 | 13 | 11 | 8 | 12 | 7 | 48 |
| 18 | (United States) Gabriel Da Silva | Yamaha; Kawasaki | | | Ret | 11 | 14 | DNS | | | 11 | 12 | Ret | 11 | 12 | 13 | 10 | 11 | 12 | Ret | Ret | 11 | 48 |
| 19 | (United States) Benjamin Smith | Yamaha | 13 | 14 | 15 | Ret | 12 | Ret | 11 | 10 | | | | | | Ret | 9 | 9 | | | 7 | Ret | 44 |
| 20 | (United States) Stefano Mesa | BMW | | | | | | | | | | | | | | | | | 9 | 6 | 10 | Ret | 22 |
| 21 | (Australia) David Anthony | Yamaha | 9 | 12 | 11 | Ret | 11 | Ret | | | | | | | | | | | | | | | 21 |
| 22 | (United States) Josh Hayes | Yamaha | | | | | | | | | | | | 4 | 8 | | | | | | | | 21 |
| 23 | (United States) Zachary Schumacher | Yamaha | | | | | Ret | 13 | | | | | | 15 | 14 | | | | 14 | 12 | | | 11 |
| 24 | (United States) Joseph Giannotto | Kawasaki | Ret | 13 | 17 | 12 | Ret | | | | | | | | | 16 | 15 | 14 | Ret | DNS | | | 10 |
| 25 | (United States) Justin Miest | Kawasaki | | | | | DNS | 14 | | | | | | 14 | 13 | | | | DNS | 13 | | | 9 |
| 26 | (United States) Kevin Pinkstaff | Kawasaki | | | | | | | 15 | 12 | | | | | | | | | | | | | 5 |
| 27 | (United States) J. C. Camacho | Kawasaki | | | DNS | DNS | | | | | | | | | | | | | Ret | 11 | | | 4 |
| 28 | (United States) Jake Schmotter | Yamaha | | | | | | | | | | | | 13 | Ret | | | | | | | | 3 |
| 29 | (United States) Taylor Knapp | Suzuki | | | | | | | 13 | Ret | | | | | | | | | | | | | 3 |
| 30 | (United States) Volga Mermut | BMW | | | | | | | 16 | 13 | | | | | | | | | | | | | 3 |
| 31 | (United States) Jason Waters | BMW | Ret | Ret | 18 | 13 | | | | | | | | | | | | | | | | | 3 |
| 32 | (United States) Travis Wyman | BMW | | | 14 | DNS | | | | | | | | | | | | | | | | | 2 |
| 33 | (United States) Manuel Segura | Suzuki | | | DNS | DNS | DNS | DNS | | | | | | DNS | DNS | | | | Ret | 14 | | | 1 |
| | (United States) Alex Arango | BMW | | | | | | | | | | | | | | | | | DNS | DNS | Ret | Ret | 0 |
| | (United States) Zachary Butler | Yamaha | | | DNS | Ret | Ret | DNS | | | | | | | | | | | DNS | DNS | | | 0 |
| | (United States) Jeremiah Walker | Ducati | | | | | | | | | | | | | | | | | DNS | DNS | | | 0 |
| | (United States) Bobby Davies | Yamaha | | | | | | | | | | | | | | | | | Ret | DNS | | | 0 |
| | (United States) Ryan Burke | Yamaha | | | DNS | DNS | | | | | | | | DNS | DNS | | | | | | | | 0 |
| Pos | Rider | Bike | ATL (Georgia (U.S. state)) | | ALA (Alabama) | | RAM (Wisconsin) | | RID (Washington (state)) | | MON (California) | | | BRA (Minnesota) | | PIT (Pennsylvania) | | | TEX (Texas) | | NJE (New Jersey) | | Pts |

=== Superbike Cup ===
| Pos | Rider | Bike | ATL (Georgia (U.S. state)) | | ALA (Alabama) | | RAM (Wisconsin) | | RID (Washington (state)) | | MON (California) | | | BRA (Minnesota) | | PIT (Pennsylvania) | | | TEX (Texas) | | NJE (New Jersey) | | Pts |
|---|---|---|---|---|---|---|---|---|---|---|---|---|---|---|---|---|---|---|---|---|---|---|---|
| 1 | (United States) Nolan Lamkin | BMW | 12 | 15 | 16 | 14 | Ret | DNS | 12 | Ret | 12 | 13 | 13 | 12 | 11 | 14 | Ret | 10 | 13 | 11 | 9 | 12 | 353 |
| 2 | (United States) Gabriel Da Silva | Yamaha; Kawasaki | | | Ret | 11 | 14 | DNS | | | 11 | 12 | Ret | 11 | 12 | 13 | 10 | 11 | 12 | Ret | Ret | 11 | 265 |
| 3 | (United States) Joseph Giannotto | Kawasaki | Ret | 13 | 17 | 12 | Ret | | | | | | | | | 16 | 15 | 14 | Ret | DNS | | | 117 |
| 4 | (United States) Zachary Schumacher | Yamaha | | | | | Ret | 13 | | | | | | 15 | 14 | | | | 14 | 13 | | | 81 |
| 5 | (United States) Justin Miest | Kawasaki | | | | | DNS | 14 | | | | | | 14 | 13 | | | | DNS | 14 | | | 62 |
| 6 | (United States) Jason Waters | BMW | Ret | Ret | 18 | 13 | | | | | | | | | | | | | | | | | 32 |
| 7 | (United States) J. C. Camacho | Kawasaki | | | DNS | DNS | | | | | | | | | | | | | Ret | 12 | | | 20 |
| 8 | (United States) Jake Schmotter | Yamaha | | | | | | | | | | | | 13 | Ret | | | | | | | | 16 |
| 9 | (United States) Manuel Segura | Suzuki | | | DNS | DNS | DNS | DNS | | | | | | DNS | DNS | | | | Ret | 15 | | | 9 |
| | (United States) Zachary Butler | Yamaha | | | DNS | Ret | Ret | DNS | | | | | | | | | | | DNS | DNS | | | 0 |
| | (United States) Bobby Davies | Yamaha | | | | | | | | | | | | | | | | | Ret | DNS | | | 0 |
| | (United States) Jeremiah Walker | Ducati | | | | | | | | | | | | | | | | | DNS | DNS | | | 0 |
| | (United States) Ryan Burke | Yamaha | | | DNS | DNS | | | | | | | | DNS | DNS | | | | | | | | 0 |
| Pos | Rider | Bike | ATL (Georgia (U.S. state)) | | ALA (Alabama) | | RAM (Wisconsin) | | RID‡ (Washington (state)) | | MON (California) | | | BRA (Minnesota) | | PIT (Pennsylvania) | | | TEX (Texas) | | NJE (New Jersey) | | Pts |
