= P. J. Jacobsen =

American motorcycle racer

Patrick Jacobsen
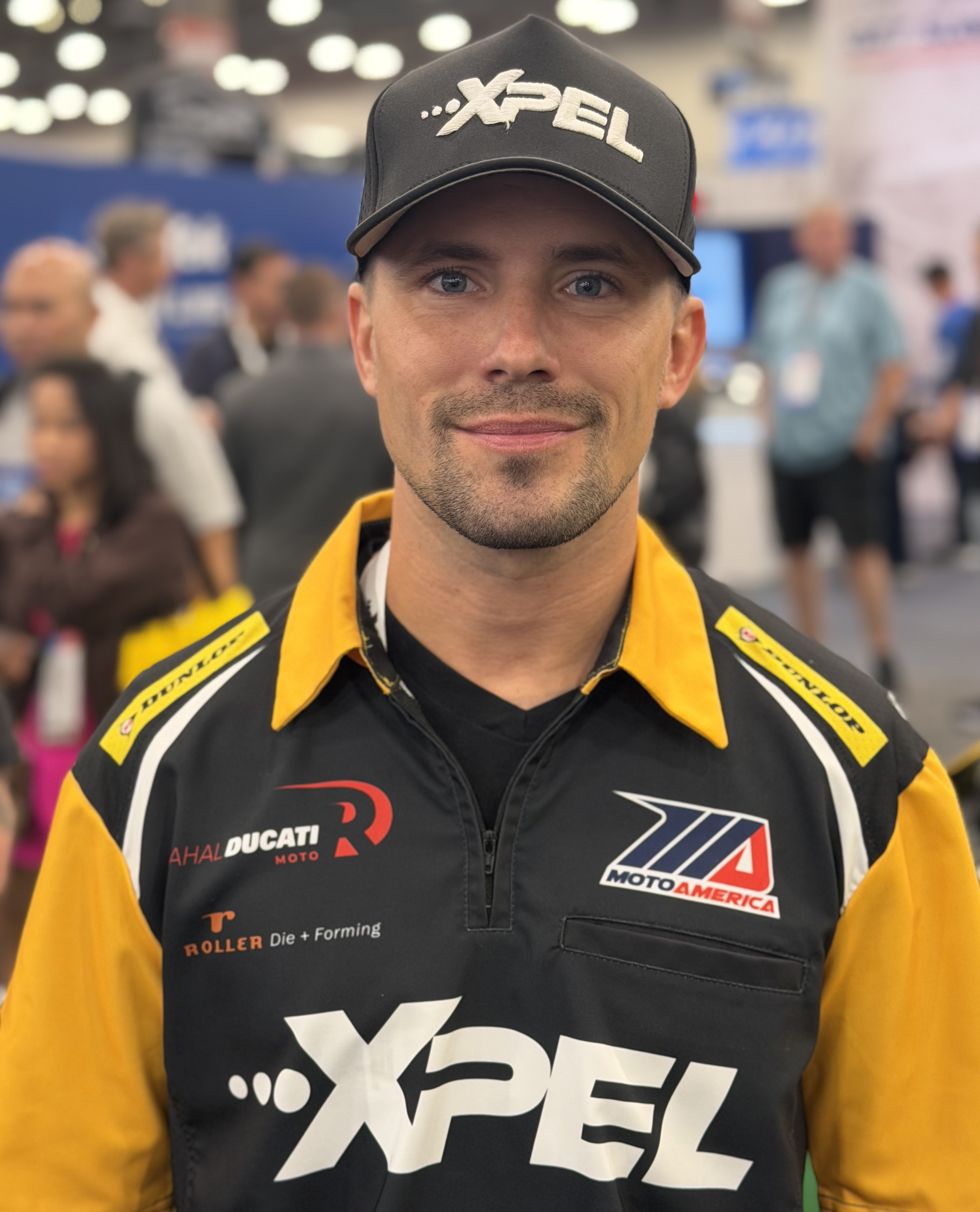
- Jacobsen in 2025
- Nationality: American
- Born: August 7, 1993 (age 33); Montgomery, United States
- Website: patrickjacobsen.com
Motorcycle racing career statistics
125cc World Championship
| Active years | 2008 |
| Manufacturers | Aprilia |
| Championships | 0 |
| 2008 championship position | NC (0 pts) |
Starts / Wins / Podiums / Poles / F. laps / Points; 1 / 0 / 0 / 0 / 0 / 0
Superbike World Championship
| Active years | 2018 |
| Manufacturers | Honda |
| Championships | 0 |
| 2018 championship position | 19th (21 pts) |
Starts / Wins / Podiums / Poles / F. laps / Points; 22 / 0 / 0 / 0 / 0 / 21
Supersport World Championship
| Active years | 2012, 2014–2017 |
| Manufacturers | Honda, Kawasaki, MV Agusta |
| Championships | 0 |
| 2017 championship position | 6th (108 pts) |
Starts / Wins / Podiums / Poles / F. laps / Points; 48 / 2 / 16 / 5 / 6 / 541

Patrick Jacob Jacobsen (born August 7, 1993, in Montgomery, New York State) is an American motorcycle racer. For most of the 2018 season, he raced in the Superbike World Championship aboard a Honda CBR1000RR before parting company with his Triple M team, being replaced for two races by Florian Marino.

== Career ==
Jacobsen was the 2006 champion of the USGPRU 125GP Championship, and has also competed in his homeland in the USGPRU 250GP Championship and AMA Pro Daytona Sportbike Championship, plus the Spanish 125GP Championship. 2012 was a fragmented season, but included two major race wins—the British Superstock 1000 race at Donington Park and the British Supersport Championship round at Assen. For 2013, he was signed to ride in the British Superbike Championship for Tyco Suzuki. Since 2014, he participates full-time in the Supersport World Championship, initially with the Kawasaki Intermoto Ponyexpres team. Since the 2015 Portuguese round, Jacobsen switched to the CORE" Motorsport Thailand on a Honda. In August 2015, in the Malaysian round, Jacobsen became the first American to take a pole position and a win in the Supersport World Championship.

== Career statistics ==
=== Grand Prix motorcycle racing ===
==== By season ====
| Season | Class | Motorcycle | Team | Race | Win | Podium | Pole | FLap | Pts | Plcd |
|---|---|---|---|---|---|---|---|---|---|---|
| 2008 | 125cc | Aprilia | Bancaja Aspar Team | 1 | 0 | 0 | 0 | 0 | 0 | NC |
| Total | | | | **1** | **0** | **0** | **0** | **0** | **0** | |

==== Races by year ====
(key) (Races in bold indicate pole position; races in italics indicate fastest lap)

| Year | Class | Bike | 1 | 2 | 3 | 4 | 5 | 6 | 7 | 8 | 9 | 10 | 11 | 12 | 13 | 14 | 15 | 16 | 17 | Pos | Pts |
|---|---|---|---|---|---|---|---|---|---|---|---|---|---|---|---|---|---|---|---|---|---|
| 2008 | 125cc | Aprilia | QAT | SPA | POR | CHN | FRA | ITA | CAT | GBR | NED | GER | CZE | RSM | INP; 22 | JPN | AUS | MAL | VAL | NC | 0 |

=== Supersport World Championship ===
==== Races by year ====
(key) (Races in bold indicate pole position; races in italics indicate fastest lap)

| Year | Bike | 1 | 2 | 3 | 4 | 5 | 6 | 7 | 8 | 9 | 10 | 11 | 12 | 13 | Pos | Pts |
|---|---|---|---|---|---|---|---|---|---|---|---|---|---|---|---|---|
| 2012 | Honda | AUS | ITA | NED; 13 | ITA | EUR | SMR | SPA | CZE | GBR | RUS | GER | POR | FRA | 35th | 3 |
| 2014 | Kawasaki | AUS; Ret | SPA; 14 | NED; 9 | ITA; 4 | GBR; 6 | MAL; 8 | ITA; 3 | POR; 5 | SPA; 2 | FRA; 8 | QAT; 12 | | | 6th | 99 |
| 2015 | Kawasaki | AUS; 10 | THA; 3 | SPA; 2 | NED; 4 | ITA; 4 | GBR; 5 | | | | | | | | **2nd** | **196** |
| 2015 | Honda | | | | | | | POR; 3 | ITA; 2 | **MAL**; 1 | SPA; 2 | **FRA**; 1 | QAT; 5 | | **2nd** | **196** |
| 2016 | Honda | AUS; 5 | THA; 3 | SPA; Ret | NED; Ret | ITA; 3 | MAL; 4 | GBR; 2 | ITA; 2 | GER; 4 | FRA; Ret | SPA; 4 | QAT; 4 | | 4th | 135 |
| 2017 | MV Agusta | **AUS**; 6 | THA; Ret | **SPA**; 3 | NED; 4 | **ITA**; 3 | GBR; Ret | ITA; 4 | GER; Ret | POR; 5 | FRA; 3 | SPA; 4 | QAT; Ret | | 6th | 108 |

=== British Supersport Championship ===
==== Races by year ====
(key) (Races in bold indicate pole position, races in italics indicate fastest lap)

| Year | Bike | 1 | | 2 | | 3 | | 4 | | 5 | | 6 | | 7 | | 8 | | 9 | | 10 | | 11 | | 12 | | Pos | Pts |
| Year | Bike | R1 | R2 | R1 | R2 | R1 | R2 | R1 | R2 | R1 | R2 | R1 | R2 | R1 | R2 | R1 | R2 | R1 | R2 | R1 | R2 | R1 | R2 | R1 | R2 | Pos | Pts |
|---|---|---|---|---|---|---|---|---|---|---|---|---|---|---|---|---|---|---|---|---|---|---|---|---|---|---|---|
| 2012 | Suzuki | BHI | BHI | THR | THR | OUL | OUL | SNE | SNE | KNO | KNO | OUL | OUL | BHGP | BHGP | CAD | CAD | DON | DON | ASS; 9 | ASS; 1 | SIL | SIL | BHGP | BHGP | 21st | 32 |

=== MotoAmerica Supersport Championship ===
==== Races by year ====
| Year | Class | Team | 1 | 2 | 3 | 4 | 5 | 6 | 7 | 8 | 9 | 10 | 11 | 12 | 13 | 14 | 15 | 16 | 17 | 18 | Pos | Pts |
|---|---|---|---|---|---|---|---|---|---|---|---|---|---|---|---|---|---|---|---|---|---|---|
| 2019 | Supersport | Yamaha | ATL; 6 | ATL; 2 | VIR; 1 | VIR; 8 | RAM; Ret | RAM; 4 | UMC; 5 | UMC; 3 | MON; 2 | SON; 3 | SON; 1 | PIT; 2 | PIT; 3 | NJR; 1 | NJR; 1 | ALA; 7 | ALA; 3 | | 2nd | 275 |
| 2025 | Supersport | Ducati | ALA; 2 | ALA; 2 | ATL; 1 | ATL; 2 | RAM; 1 | RAM; 3 | RID; 2 | RID; 2 | MON; 3 | MON; 4 | VIR; 2 | VIR; 2 | MID | MID | TEX | TEX | NJR | NJR | 2nd* | 235* |

=== British Superbike Championship ===
(key) (Races in bold indicate pole position; races in italics indicate fastest lap)

| Year | Make | 1 | | | 2 | | | 3 | | | 4 | | | 5 | | | 6 | | | 7 | | | 8 | | | 9 | | | 10 | | | 11 | | | 12 | | | Pos | Pts |
| Year | Make | R1 | R2 | R3 | R1 | R2 | R3 | R1 | R2 | R3 | R1 | R2 | R3 | R1 | R2 | R3 | R1 | R2 | R3 | R1 | R2 | R3 | R1 | R2 | R3 | R1 | R2 | R3 | R1 | R2 | R3 | R1 | R2 | R3 | R1 | R2 | R3 | Pos | Pts |
|---|---|---|---|---|---|---|---|---|---|---|---|---|---|---|---|---|---|---|---|---|---|---|---|---|---|---|---|---|---|---|---|---|---|---|---|---|---|---|---|
| 2013 | Suzuki | BHI; 9 | BHI; 12 | | THR; 9 | THR; 11 | | OUL; 8 | OUL; Ret | | KNO; 9 | KNO; 7 | | SNE; Ret | SNE; 11 | | BHGP; 5 | BHGP; 8 | | OUL; 7 | OUL; 6 | OUL; Ret | CAD; 5 | CAD; Ret | | DON; 9 | DON; 9 | | ASS; 7 | ASS; 2 | | SIL; 4 | SIL; 6 | | BHGP; 5 | BHGP; 6 | BHGP; Ret | 9th | 188 |

=== Superbike World Championship ===
==== Races by year ====
(key) (Races in bold indicate pole position; races in italics indicate fastest lap)

| Year | Bike | 1 | | 2 | | 3 | | 4 | | 5 | | 6 | | 7 | | 8 | | 9 | | 10 | | 11 | | 12 | | 13 | | Pos | Pts |
| Year | Bike | R1 | R2 | R1 | R2 | R1 | R2 | R1 | R2 | R1 | R2 | R1 | R2 | R1 | R2 | R1 | R2 | R1 | R2 | R1 | R2 | R1 | R2 | R1 | R2 | R1 | R2 | Pos | Pts |
|---|---|---|---|---|---|---|---|---|---|---|---|---|---|---|---|---|---|---|---|---|---|---|---|---|---|---|---|---|---|
| 2018 | Honda | AUS; 16 | AUS; 14 | THA; 17 | THA; 10 | SPA; 16 | SPA; 14 | NED; 14 | NED; 13 | ITA; Ret | ITA; 14 | GBR; 15 | GBR; 16 | CZE; 16 | CZE; 13 | USA; Ret | USA; Ret | ITA; 16 | ITA; Ret | POR; Ret | POR; 17 | FRA; 16 | FRA; 17 | ARG | ARG | QAT | QAT | 19th | 21 |

=== MotoAmerica Superbike Championship ===
==== Races by year ====
| Year | Class | Team | 1 | | 2 | | 3 | | 4 | | 5 | | | 6 | | 7 | | | 8 | | | 9 | | | 10 | | Pos | Pts |
| Year | Class | Team | R1 | R2 | R1 | R2 | R1 | R2 | R1 | R2 | R1 | R2 | R3 | R1 | R2 | R1 | R2 | R3 | R1 | R2 | R3 | R1 | R2 | R3 | R1 | R2 | Pos | Pts |
|---|---|---|---|---|---|---|---|---|---|---|---|---|---|---|---|---|---|---|---|---|---|---|---|---|---|---|---|---|
| 2020 | SuperBike | Ducati | RAM; 7 | RAM; 5 | RAM; 9 | RAM; DNS | ATL | ATL | PIT | PIT | TRD | TRD | | NJR | NJR | ALA | ALA | | BRI | BRI | BRI | LGS | LGS | LGS | | | 19th | 27 |
| 2022 | SuperBike | BMW | TEX; 4 | TEX; Ret | ATL | ATL | VIR; 7 | VIR; 5 | RAM; 4 | RAM; 2 | TRD; Ret | TRD; 9 | | LGS; 7 | LGS; 6 | BRA; 5 | BRA; 3 | | PIT; Ret | PIT; 5 | | **NJR**; 5 | **NJR**; Ret | | ALA; 4 | ALA; 3 | 6th | 170 |
| 2023 | SuperBike | BMW | ATL; Ret | ATL; 6 | BAR; 5 | BAR; 5 | RAM; 2 | RAM; 2 | TRD; 6 | TRD; 7 | LGS; 3 | LGS; Ret | LGS; 6 | BRA; 2 | BRA; 1 | PIT; 5 | PIT; 2 | PIT; 5 | TEX; 4 | TEX; 2 | | **NJR**; 4 | **NJR**; 2 | | | | 3rd | 266 |

=== MotoAmerica Stock 1000 Championship ===
==== Races by year ====
| Year | Class | Team | 1 | | 2 | | 3 | | 4 | 5 | 6 | | 7 | 8 | Pos | Pts |
| Year | Class | Team | R1 | R2 | R1 | R2 | R1 | R2 | R1 | R1 | R1 | R2 | R1 | R1 | Pos | Pts |
|---|---|---|---|---|---|---|---|---|---|---|---|---|---|---|---|---|
| 2020 | Stock 1000 | Ducati | RAM; 1 | RAM | ATL; DNS | ATL | PIT | PIT | TRD | NJR | ALA | ALA | BRI | LGS | 17th | 25 |
