= Toni Elías =

Spanish motorcycle racer

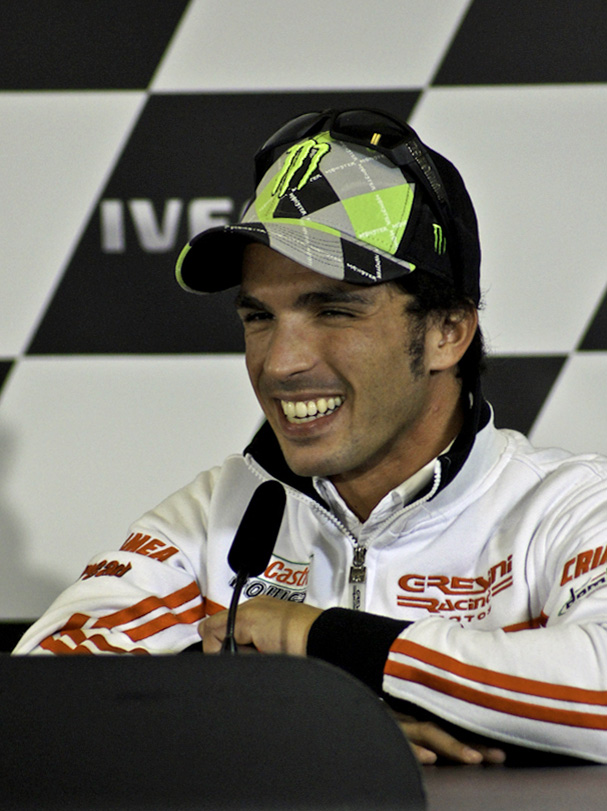
- Elías at the 2010 Australian Grand Prix
- Nationality: Spanish
- Born: 26 March 1983 (age 43); Manresa, Spain
Motorcycle racing career statistics
MotoGP World Championship
Active years	2005–2009, 2011–2012, 2015
Manufacturers	Yamaha, Honda, Ducati, Yamaha Forward
Championships	0
2015 championship position	27th (2 pts)
Starts / Wins / Podiums / Poles / F. laps / Points; 105 / 1 / 6 / 0 / 3 / 574
Moto2 World Championship
Active years	2010, 2012–2013
Manufacturers	Moriwaki, Suter, Kalex
Championships	1 (2010)
2013 championship position	18th (22 pts)
Starts / Wins / Podiums / Poles / F. laps / Points; 41 / 7 / 8 / 3 / 2 / 343
250cc World Championship
Active years	2002–2004
Manufacturers	Aprilia, Honda
Championships	0
2004 championship position	4th (199 pts)
Starts / Wins / Podiums / Poles / F. laps / Points; 48 / 7 / 20 / 5 / 6 / 603
125cc World Championship
Active years	1999–2001
Manufacturers	Honda
Championships	0
2001 championship position	3rd (217 pts)
Starts / Wins / Podiums / Poles / F. laps / Points; 35 / 2 / 9 / 4 / 1 / 243
Superbike World Championship
Active years	2013–2014
Manufacturers	Aprilia
Championships	0
2014 championship position	9th (171 pts)
Starts / Wins / Podiums / Poles / F. laps / Points; 32 / 0 / 0 / 0 / 0 / 241

Antonio Elías Justícia (born 26 March 1983) is a Spanish former professional motorcycle racer and inaugural champion of the 2010 Moto2 World Championship. He is the third member of the Elías family to compete in motorcycle racing. He last rode in the MotoAmerica AMA Superbike Championship, where, in June, he abruptly announced his retirement mid-way through the 2023 season.

Elías finished third in the 2016 season, with six wins out of 18 and 304 points, seven less than champion Cameron Beaubier. He won the championship in 2017, and in 2018 and 2019 he finished as runner-up.

== Career ==
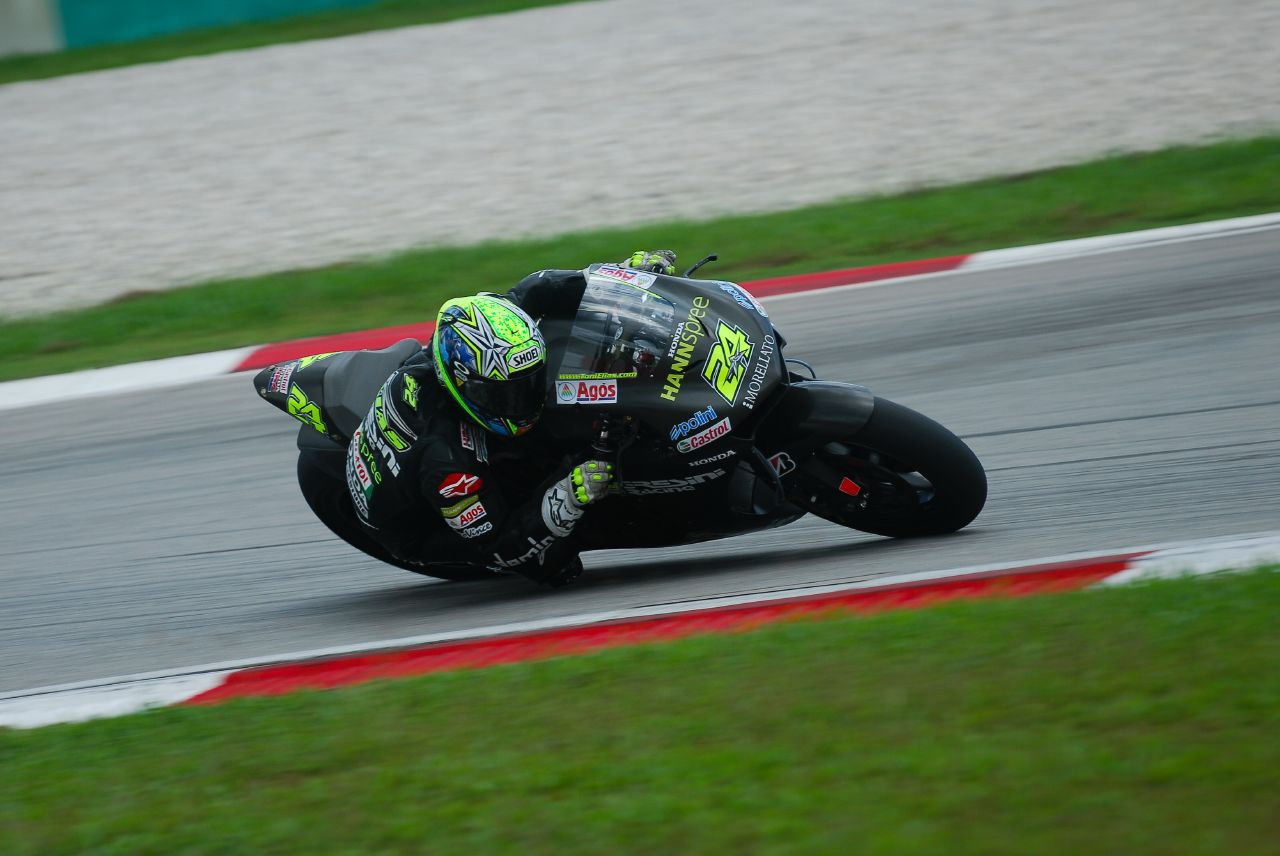
Elías testing at Sepang in 2007.

Born in Manresa, Catalonia, Spain Elías started racing in the 125cc World Championship in 2000 at the age of 17, finishing third in 2001 and taking his first win in the Dutch TT at the prestigious Assen circuit. He went to 250cc for 2002, finishing fourth that year, third a year later, and fourth in 2004.

In 2005, Elías entered MotoGP for Fortuna Yamaha. In 2006 and 2007, his Fortuna backing got him a ride for Gresini Honda alongside 2005 runner-up Marco Melandri. He only took one podium in 2006, albeit his first, and so far only, win in the top category. After a podium in the first half of 2007, he crashed at Assen, breaking his leg, sabotaging his season. He managed to make a return to the podium at Motegi.

After spending the 2008 season with the Alice Ducati team, Elías returned to Gresini Honda for 2009, replacing Shinya Nakano to ride alongside Alex de Angelis.

For 2010, Elías moved down to the new Moto2 class, on a Moriwaki bike for Gresini. He was competitive in pre-season testing before a heavy crash threatened to derail his status as title favourite. He was victorious at Le Mans after a chaotic race also led by Alex Debón and Jules Cluzel. He claimed the lead in the championship following this win, and would not relinquish it for the remainder of the season, clinching the inaugural Moto2 World Championship at the Malaysian Grand Prix with three rounds to spare.

Elías returned to the MotoGP grid in 2011 with Team LCR, riding a Honda RC212V. 2011 heralded his worst season in the MotoGP class, scoring only 61 points and finishing 15th in the Championship. He left Team LCR and returned to Moto2 in 2012 with the Aspar Team, a team he rode for in the 250cc class. After Mugello, both Elías and Aspar ended their relationship.

On 24 July 2012, Pramac Ducati announced that Elías would replace the injured Hector Barbera until he was deemed fit to race. He raced a Satellite version of the GP12. At Laguna Seca, he qualified 17th and retired during the race. He was scheduled to ride at Indianapolis but Barbera decided he wanted to return early, however Barbera suffered a high-side in practice and injured his leg once more. Elias substituted for him until San Marino.

=== First MotoGP Victory ===
Elías won his first premier class race on 15 October 2006 with a fantastic final lap of the Portuguese MotoGP at Estoril. Elías had started the lap in third place, but an aggressive braking move into Curva 1, moved him past Valentino Rossi and the then-leader Kenny Roberts, Jr. into the lead. He actually clipped Roberts while braking, and this loss of momentum meant that Rossi passed Roberts for second position. These positions held until the chicane (turns 9 and 10) near the end of the lap. It looked like Elías had left the door wide open for Rossi and the reigning world champion dived to the inside to pass the Spaniard.

However, Elías would keep pressuring Rossi, trying to pass him on the run towards turns 11 and 12. Rossi had the line and kept the position, and it seemed as if Rossi would be 13 points clear of title rival Nicky Hayden going to the final round in Valencia. But Elías kept the speed up through the thirteenth and final turn, and tucked in behind Rossi, to draft him alongside the Italian. In a finish that needed a video replay, Elías was given the race by just 0.002 seconds. It was one of the closest finishes in the history of MotoGP, and a great way for Elías to secure his maiden premier class victory. This victory helped secure him a contract extension, which was doubtful prior to the win at Estoril, with Honda and Fausto Gresini for the 2007 Moto GP season. Elías was the last non-factory rider to win a race until Jack Miller won for the Marc VDS Racing Team at the 2016 Dutch TT.

As it turned out, Elías' victory cost Rossi five points, which was the exact number of points that Rossi would finish behind Hayden in the Championship standings.

=== MotoAmerica ===
In 2016, Elías entered the MotoAmerica Superbike category racing for Yoshimura Suzuki Factory Racing team using the number 24, alongside teammate Roger Hayden. Elias took first place in the first three races of the season after being called in for substitute duty.

Elías won the Superbike championship in 2017 on ten victories and 18 podium finishes, never finishing lower than second place for any race where he took the checkered flag.

Elías announced his retirement from MotoAmerica Superbike racing at the end of the 2020 season after 32 career wins and 60 career podium finishes for Suzuki.

== Career statistics ==
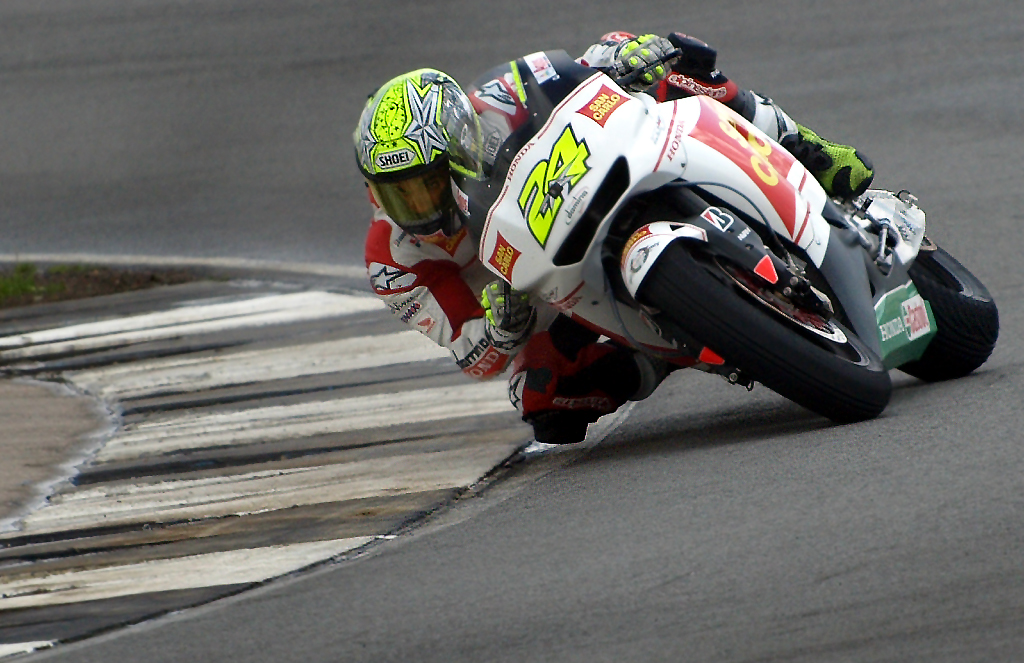
Elías on a Honda RC212V at the 2009 Dutch TT.

=== Career summary ===
Season	Series	Motorcycle	Team	Race	Win	Podium	Pole	FLap	Pts	Plcd
1999	125cc	Honda RS125R	R.A.C.C.	2	0	0	0	0	2	33rd
1999	125cc	Honda RS125R	Polini	1	0	0	0	0	2	33rd
2000	125cc	Honda RS125R	Chupa Chups Matteoni Racing	16	0	0	0	0	24	20th
2001	125cc	Honda RS125R	Telefónica Movistar Junior Team	16	2	9	4	1	217	3rd
2002	250cc	Aprilia RSV 250	Telefónica Movistar-Repsol	16	1	5	0	1	178	4th
2003	250cc	Aprilia RSV 250	Team Repsol Telefónica Movistar	16	5	7	5	4	226	3rd
2004	250cc	Honda RS250RW	Fortuna Honda	16	1	8	0	1	199	4th
2005	MotoGP	Yamaha YZR-M1	Fortuna Yamaha Team	14	0	0	0	0	74	12th
2006	MotoGP	Honda RC211V	Fortuna Honda	15	1	1	0	1	116	9th
2007	MotoGP	Honda RC212V	Honda Gresini	15	0	2	0	2	104	12th
2008	MotoGP	Ducati Desmosedici GP8	Alice Team	18	0	2	0	0	92	12th
2009	MotoGP	Honda RC212V	San Carlo Honda Gresini	17	0	1	0	0	115	7th
2010	Moto2	Moriwaki MD600	Gresini Racing Moto2	17	7	8	3	2	271	1st
2011	MotoGP	Honda RC212V	LCR Honda MotoGP	17	0	0	0	0	61	15th
2012	MotoGP	Ducati Desmosedici GP12	Pramac Racing Team	3	0	0	0	0	10	24th
2012	Moto2	Suter MMX2	Mapfre Aspar Team Moto2	9	0	0	0	0	50	16th
2012	Moto2	Kalex Moto2	Italtrans Racing Team	4	0	0	0	0	50	16th
2013	Moto2	Kalex Moto2	Blusens Avintia	11	0	0	0	0	22	18th
2013	Superbike	Aprilia RSV4 Factory	Red Devils Roma	8	0	0	0	0	70	16th
2014	Superbike	Aprilia RSV4 Factory	Red Devils Roma	24	0	0	0	0	171	9th
2015	MotoGP	Honda RC213V-RS	AB Motoracing	1	0	0	0	0	2	27th
2015	MotoGP	Yamaha Forward	Forward Racing	5	0	0	0	0	2	27th
2016	MotoAmerica Superbike	Suzuki GSX-R1000	Yoshimura Suzuki Factory Racing	N/A					304	3rd
2017	MotoAmerica Superbike	Suzuki GSX-R1000	Yoshimura Suzuki Factory Racing	N/A					410	1st
2018	MotoAmerica Superbike	Suzuki GSX-R1000	Yoshimura Suzuki Factory Racing	N/A					339	2nd
2019	MotoAmerica Superbike	Suzuki GSX-R1000	Yoshimura Suzuki Factory Racing	N/A					362	2nd
2020	MotoAmerica Superbike	Suzuki GSX-R1000	M4 ECSTAR Suzuki	N/A					222	4th
2021	MotoAmerica Superbike	Ducati / Yamaha	Panera Bread Ducati / Fresh N' Lean Attack Performance Yamaha	N/A					76	12th
2023	MotoAmerica Superbike	Suzuki GSX-R1000	Vision Wheel M4 ECSTAR Suzuki	N/A					49	16th

=== Grand Prix motorcycle racing ===
All statistics according to MotoGP.com

==== By class ====
Class	Seasons	1st GP	1st Pod	1st Win	Race	Win	Podiums	Pole	FLap	Pts	WChmp
125cc	1999–2001	1999 Spain	2001 France	2001 Netherlands	35	2	9	4	1	243	0
250cc	2002–2004	2002 Japan	2002 Netherlands	2002 Pacific	48	7	20	5	6	603	0
MotoGP	2005–2009, 2011–2012, 2015	2005 Spain	2006 Portugal	2006 Portugal	105	1	6	0	3	574	0
Moto2	2010, 2012–2013	2010 Qatar	2010 Spain	2010 Spain	41	7	8	3	2	343	1
Total	1999–2013, 2015				**229**	**17**	**43**	**12**	**12**	**1763**	**1**

==== Races by year ====
(key) (Races in bold indicate pole position, races in italics indicate fastest lap)

Year	Class	Bike	1	2	3	4	5	6	7	8	9	10	11	12	13	14	15	16	17	18	Pos	Pts
1999	125cc	Honda	MAL	JPN	SPA; 21	FRA	ITA	CAT; Ret	NED	GBR	GER	CZE	IMO	VAL; 14	AUS	RSA	RIO	ARG			33rd	2
2000	125cc	Honda	RSA; 23	MAL; 17	JPN; 17	SPA; 16	FRA; 17	ITA; 15	CAT; 8	NED; Ret	GBR; 14	GER; Ret	CZE; 14	POR; 17	VAL; 15	RIO; 14	PAC; 12	AUS; 12			20th	24
2001	125cc	Honda	JPN; 16	RSA; 18	SPA; 13	FRA; 3	ITA; 4	CAT; 2	NED; 1	**GBR**; 2	GER; 2	**CZE**; 1	POR; 3	**VAL**; 2	PAC; Ret	AUS; 3	**MAL**; 6	RIO; 4			**3rd**	**217**
2002	250cc	Aprilia	JPN; 11	RSA; 16	SPA; 10	FRA; 6	ITA; 4	CAT; 10	NED; 2	GBR; 3	GER; 6	CZE; 3	POR; 13	RIO; 5	PAC; 1	MAL; 2	AUS; 5	VAL; 10			4th	178
2003	250cc	Aprilia	JPN; Ret	RSA; 8	SPA; 1	FRA; 1	ITA; 6	CAT; 4	NED; 13	GBR; 4	GER; 7	CZE; 2	**POR**; 1	**RIO**; 18	**PAC**; 1	**MAL**; 1	**AUS**; 11	VAL; 2			**3rd**	**226**
2004	250cc	Honda	RSA; 8	SPA; 12	FRA; 3	ITA; 6	CAT; 3	NED; 3	RIO; 3	GER; 22	GBR; Ret	CZE; 5	POR; 1	JPN; 2	QAT; 6	MAL; 3	AUS; 5	VAL; 2			4th	199
2005	MotoGP	Yamaha	SPA; 12	POR; 14	CHN; 14	FRA; 9	ITA	CAT	NED	USA; 13	GBR; 9	GER; 12	CZE; 14	JPN; 9	MAL; 11	QAT; 8	AUS; 9	TUR; 6	VAL; 10		12th	74
2006	MotoGP	Honda	SPA; 4	QAT; 8	TUR; 5	CHN; 11	FRA; 9	ITA; 7	CAT; Ret	NED; WD	GBR	GER; 11	USA; 15	CZE; 11	MAL; Ret	AUS; 9	JPN; 6	POR; 1	VAL; 6		9th	116
2007	MotoGP	Honda	QAT; 14	SPA; 4	TUR; 2	CHN; Ret	FRA; Ret	ITA; 6	CAT; Ret	GBR; 12	NED; WD	GER	USA	CZE; 11	RSM; 7	POR; 8	JPN; 3	AUS; 15	MAL; 6	VAL; 10	12th	104
2008	MotoGP	Ducati	QAT; 14	SPA; 15	POR; 12	CHN; 8	FRA; 11	ITA; 12	CAT; DSQ	GBR; 11	NED; 12	GER; 12	USA; 7	CZE; 2	RSM; 3	INP; 12	JPN; 16	AUS; 11	MAL; 15	VAL; 18	12th	92
2009	MotoGP	Honda	QAT; 9	JPN; 15	SPA; 9	FRA; 10	ITA; 14	CAT; 18	NED; 12	USA; 6	GER; 6	GBR; Ret	CZE; 3	INP; 9	RSM; 6	POR; 6	AUS; 10	MAL; 7	VAL; 6		7th	115
2010	Moto2	Moriwaki	**QAT**; 4	SPA; 1	FRA; 1	ITA; 5	GBR; 10	NED; 2	CAT; 5	GER; 1	CZE; 1	INP; 1	**RSM**; 1	ARA; 4	JPN; 1	MAL; 4	AUS; 7	POR; Ret	**VAL**; 30		**1st**	**271**
2011	MotoGP	Honda	QAT; Ret	SPA; 9	POR; 11	FRA; 11	CAT; 13	GBR; 8	NED; 10	ITA; 15	GER; 16	USA; 13	CZE; 11	INP; 13	RSM; 15	ARA; Ret	JPN; Ret	AUS; 8	MAL; C	VAL; 10	15th	61
2012	Moto2	Suter	QAT; 13	SPA; 9	POR; 7	FRA; 11	CAT; Ret	GBR; 12	NED; 9	GER; Ret	ITA; Ret				RSM	ARA					16th	50
2012	Moto2	Kalex															JPN; Ret	MAL; 12	AUS; 12	VAL; 9	16th	50
2012	MotoGP	Ducati										USA; Ret	INP; 11	CZE; 11							24th	10
2013	Moto2	Kalex	QAT; 15	AME; 9	SPA; 9	FRA; Ret	ITA; 11	CAT; Ret	NED; Ret	GER; 20	INP; 17	CZE; 15	GBR; 15	RSM	ARA	MAL	AUS	JPN	VAL		18th	22
2015	MotoGP	Honda	QAT	AME	ARG	SPA	FRA	ITA	CAT	NED	GER	INP; 22	CZE	GBR	RSM						27th	2
2015	MotoGP	Yamaha Forward														ARA; 21	JPN; 20	AUS; 22	MAL; 14	VAL; 20	27th	2

=== Superbike World Championship ===
==== Races by year ====
(key) (Races in bold indicate pole position, races in italics indicate fastest lap)

Year	Bike	1		2		3		4		5		6		7		8		9		10		11		12		13		14		Pos	Pts
Year	Bike	R1	R2	R1	R2	R1	R2	R1	R2	R1	R2	R1	R2	R1	R2	R1	R2	R1	R2	R1	R2	R1	R2	R1	R2	R1	R2	R1	R2	Pos	Pts
2013	Aprilia	AUS	AUS	SPA	SPA	NED	NED	ITA	ITA	GBR	GBR	POR	POR	ITA	ITA	RUS	RUS	GBR	GBR	GER	GER	TUR; 6	TUR; 5	USA; 8	USA; 7	FRA; Ret	FRA; 8	SPA; 5	SPA; 4	16th	70
2014	Aprilia	AUS; Ret	AUS; 9	SPA; 7	SPA; 9	NED; 5	NED; Ret	ITA; 9	ITA; 7	GBR; 9	GBR; 8	MAL; 5	MAL; 4	SMR; 6	SMR; 6	POR; Ret	POR; 10	USA; 5	USA; 5	SPA; 8	SPA; 10	FRA; Ret	FRA; Ret	QAT; 6	QAT; 6					9th	171

=== Suzuka 8 Hours Results ===
Year	Team	Co-riders	Bike	Pos
2015	(Japan) TOHO Racing with MORIWAKI	(Japan) Tatsuya Yamaguchi (Thailand) Ratthapark Wilairot	Honda CBR1000RR	14th

=== MotoAmerica Superbike Championship ===
==== Races by year ====
Year	Team	1		2		3		4		5		6		7		8			9			10		Pos	Pts
Year	Team	R1	R2	R1	R2	R1	R2	R1	R2	R1	R2	R1	R2	R1	R2	R1	R2	R3	R1	R2	R3	R1	R2	Pos	Pts
2016	Suzuki	COA; 1	COA; 1	ATL; 1	ATL; Ret	NJR; 18	NJR; 12	VIR; 3	VIR; 3	RAM; 4	RAM; 2	BAR; 2	BAR; 1	UMC; 4	UMC; 1	LGS; 2	LGS; 3		NJR; 1	NJR; 1				**3rd**	**304**
2017	Suzuki	COA; 1	COA; 1	ATL; 2	ATL; 1	VIR; Ret	VIR; 2	RAM; 2	RAM; 1	UMC; 1	UMC; 1	LGS; 1	LGS; 1	SON; 2	SON; 2	PIT; 2	PIT; 2		NJR; 2	NJR; 1		BAR; 1	BAR; Ret	**1st**	**390**
2018	Suzuki	ATL; 1	ATL; 1	COA; 4	COA; 1	VIR; 1	VIR; 1	RAM; Ret	RAM; 4	LGS; 13	LGS; 2	UMC; 1	UMC; Ret	SON; 3	SON; 2	PIT; 4	PIT; 1		NJR; Ret	NJR; 3		BAR; 1	BAR; 1	**2nd**	**339**
2019	Suzuki	ATL; 2	ATL; 1	COA; 1	COA; 2	VIR; 2	VIR; 3	RAM; 1	RAM; Ret	UMC; 1	UMC; 1	LGS; 1	LGS; 2	SON; 2	SON; Ret	PIT; 3	PIT; 1		NJR; 4	NJR; 4		BAR; 3	BAR; 4	**2nd**	**362**
2020	Suzuki	RAM; 19	RAM; Ret	RAM; 4	RAM; 7	ATL; 4	ATL; 5	PIT; 5	PIT; 5	TRD; 5	TRD; 6	NJR; 3	NJR; 5	BAR; 4	BAR; 4	IND; 4	IND; 5	IND; DNS	LGS; 2	LGS; 3	LGS; 2			4th	222
2021	Ducati	RAT	RAT	VIR	VIR	RAM	RAM	RID	RID	LGS; 8	LGS; 7	BRA	BRA	PIT	PIT	NJR	NJR	NJR	BAR	BAR	BAR			12th	76
2021	Yamaha	RAT	RAT	VIR	VIR	RAM	RAM	RID	RID	LGS	LGS	BRA	BRA	PIT; 2	PIT; 4	NJR; 3	NJR; Ret	NJR; 6	BAR	BAR	BAR			12th	76
2023	Suzuki	ATL; 7	ATL; 8	BAR; 12	BAR; 9	RAM; 6	RAM; 5	TRD	TRD	LGS	LGS	LGS	BRA	BRA	PIT	PIT	PIT	TEX	TEX	NJR	NJR			16th	49
