= Jake Gagne =

American motorcycle racer

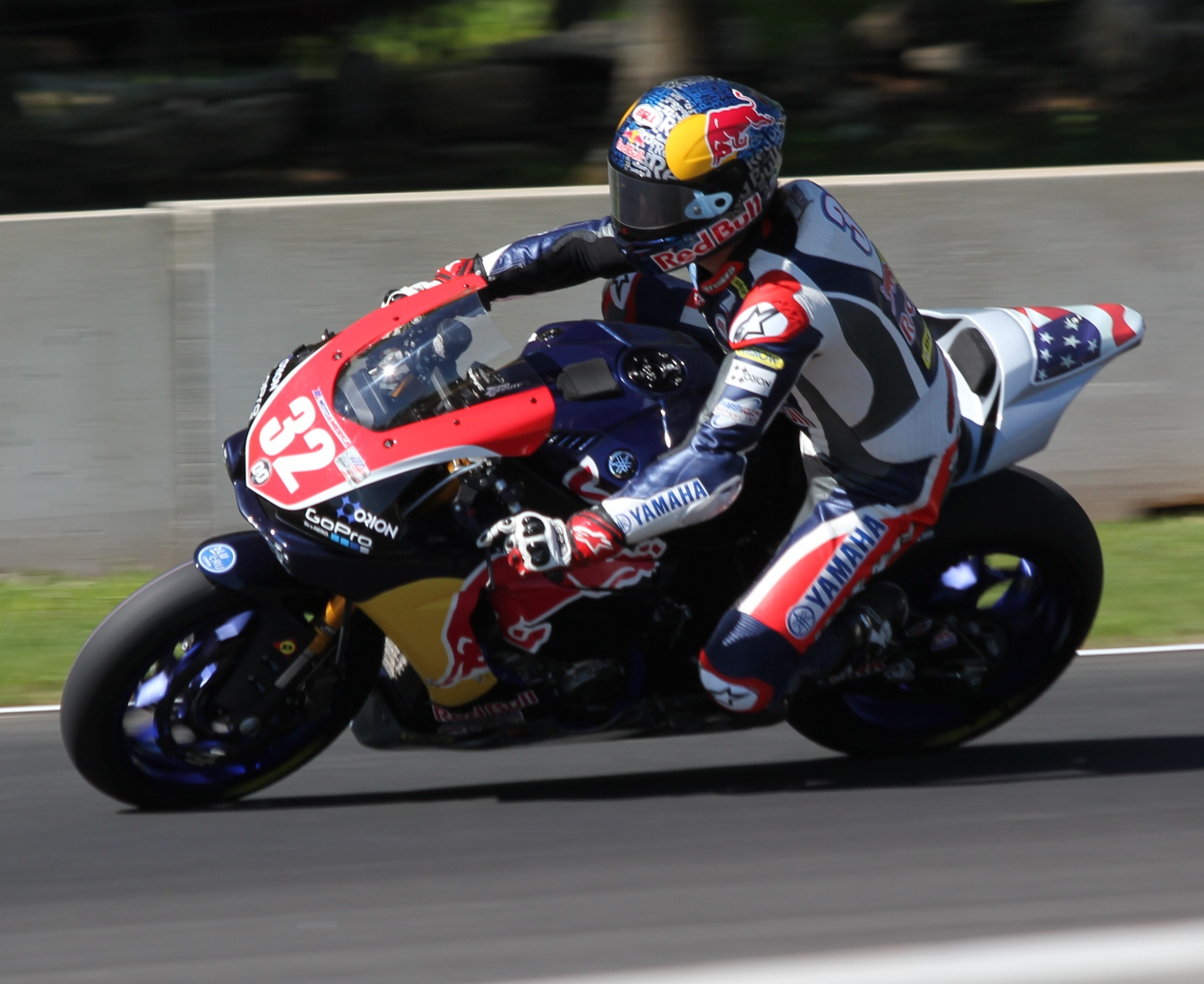
- Gagne in a 2015 Superstock race at Road America
- Nationality: American
- Born: August 27, 1993 (age 33); Ramona, California, United States
- Current team: Attack Performance Yamaha
- Bike number: 32
Motorcycle racing career statistics
Moto2 World Championship
Active years	2011
Manufacturers	FTR
Championships	0
2011 championship position	NC (0 pts)
Starts / Wins / Podiums / Poles / F. laps / Points; 2 / 0 / 0 / 0 / 0 / 0
Superbike World Championship
Active years	2017–2018, 2022
Manufacturers	Honda, Yamaha
Championships	0
2022 championship position	31st (1 pts)
Starts / Wins / Podiums / Poles / F. laps / Points; 32 / 0 / 0 / 0 / 0 / 79
AMA Superbike Championship / MotoAmerica
Active years	2016–present
Manufacturers	Yamaha
Championships	3
2023 championship position	1st
Starts / Wins / Podiums / Poles / F. laps / Points; 0 / 0 / 0 / 0 / 0 / 0

Jacob Raymond Gagne (born August 27, 1993) is an American motorcycle racer. In 2023, he signed with Yamaha to ride in the American Superbike Championship.

== Career ==
Gagne competed in the Spanish Moto2 Championship, the Red Bull AMA Rookies Cup and won the Red Bull MotoGP Rookies Cup in 2010. He was the AMA Pro Daytona Sportbike champion in 2014, the MotoAmerica Superstock 1000 champion in 2015 and a MotoAmerica AMA Superbike Championship regular in 2016 and 2017.

During the 2017 season, Gagne was called up to Ten Kate Racing as a replacement rider, at the July Laguna Seca round due to Nicky Hayden's death in May, and twice-again later in the season to substitute for injured Stefan Bradl at Magny-Cours and Losail.

In December 2017, Gagne signed to compete in the 2018 Superbike World Championship series aboard a Honda Fireblade SP2 for Ten Kate Racing as teammate to Leon Camier.

After the 2018 season in World Superbikes, Gagne returned to race in the North American Superbike Championship series riding for Scheibe BMW.

Gagne won three consecutive championships in the AMA Superbike Championship, in 2021, 2022, and 2023.

== Career statistics ==
=== Red Bull MotoGP Rookies Cup ===
==== Races by year ====
(key) (Races in bold indicate pole position, races in italics indicate fastest lap)

Year	1	2	3	4	5	6	7	8	9	10	Pos	Pts
2009	SPA1; 11	SPA2; 9	ITA; Ret	NED; 3	GER; 3	GBR; 5	CZE1; 4	CZE2; 3			6th	84
2010	SPA1; 5	SPA2; 6	ITA; 8	NED1; 1	NED2; 4	**GER1**; 1	**GER2**; 1	CZE1; 8	CZE2; 1	RSM; 2	1st	170

=== Grand Prix motorcycle racing ===
==== By season ====
Season	Class	Motorcycle	Team	Race	Win	Podium	Pole	FLap	Pts	Plcd
2011	Moto2	FTR	GP Tech	2	0	0	0	0	0	NC
2011	Moto2	FTR	Aeroport de Castelló	2	0	0	0	0	0	NC
Total				**2**	**0**	**0**	**0**	**0**	**0**	

==== Races by year ====
(key) (Races in bold indicate pole position; races in italics indicate fastest lap)

Year	Class	Bike	1	2	3	4	5	6	7	8	9	10	11	12	13	14	15	16	17	Pos	Pts
2011	Moto2	FTR	QAT	SPA	POR	FRA	CAT	GBR	NED	ITA	GER	CZE	INP; 31	RSM; 28	ARA	JPN	AUS	MAL	VAL	NC	0

=== Superbike World Championship ===
==== Races by year ====
(key) (Races in bold indicate pole position; races in italics indicate fastest lap)

Year	Bike	1		2		3		4		5		6		7		8		9		10		11		12		13		Pos	Pts
Year	Bike	R1	R2	R1	R2	R1	R2	R1	R2	R1	R2	R1	R2	R1	R2	R1	R2	R1	R2	R1	R2	R1	R2	R1	R2	R1	R2	Pos	Pts
2017	Honda	AUS	AUS	THA	THA	SPA	SPA	NED	NED	ITA	ITA	GBR	GBR	ITA	ITA	USA; 15	USA; 15	GER	GER	POR	POR	FRA; Ret	FRA; 12	SPA	SPA	QAT; 12	QAT; 12	24th	14
2018	Honda	AUS; 12	AUS; 13	THA; 18	THA; 14	SPA; 12	SPA; 12	NED; DNS	NED; DNS	ITA; 16	ITA; Ret	GBR; 16	GBR; 13	CZE; Ret	CZE; 12	USA; 10	USA; 9	ITA; 14	ITA; 14	POR; 13	POR; 12	FRA; 13	FRA; 16	ARG; Ret	ARG; 10	QAT; 9	QAT; C	17th	64

Year	Bike	1			2			3			4			5			6			7			8			9			10			11			12			Pos	Pts
Year	Bike	R1	SR	R2	R1	SR	R2	R1	SR	R2	R1	SR	R2	R1	SR	R2	R1	SR	R2	R1	SR	R2	R1	SR	R2	R1	SR	R2	R1	SR	R2	R1	SR	R2	R1	SR	R2	Pos	Pts
2022	Yamaha	SPA	SPA	SPA	NED	NED	NED	POR	POR	POR	ITA	ITA	ITA	GBR	GBR	GBR	CZE	CZE	CZE	FRA	FRA	FRA	SPA	SPA	SPA	POR; 19	POR; 16	POR; 15	ARG	ARG	ARG	INA	INA	INA	AUS	AUS	AUS	31st	1

^{*} Season still in progress.

=== MotoAmerica SuperBike Championship ===
==== Results by year ====
Year	Class	Team	1		2			3		4		5			6		7			8			9			10		Pos	Pts
Year	Class	Team	R1	R2	R1	R2	R3	R1	R2	R1	R2	R1	R2	R3	R1	R2	R1	R2	R3	R1	R2	R3	R1	R2	R3	R1	R2	Pos	Pts
2019	SuperBike	BMW	ATL; 8	ATL; Ret	COA; DNS	COA; DNS		VIR; 6	VIR; Ret	RAM; 8	RAM; 7	UMC; 7	UMC; 7		LGS; Ret	LGS; 7	SON; 5	SON; 6		PIT; 4	PIT; 7		NJR; 8	NJR; 8		BAR; 6	BAR; Ret	**8th**	**131**
2020	SuperBike	Yamaha	RAM; 3	RAM; 2	RAM; 6	RAM; 2		ATL; 2	ATL; 2	PIT; 3	PIT; 3	**TRD**; 4	**TRD**; 2		NJR; Ret	NJR; 2	ALA; 2	ALA; 5		BRI; 2	BRI; 4	BRI; 7	LGS; 4	LGS; 4	LGS; 5			2nd	301
2021	SuperBike	Yamaha	**ATL**; Ret	ATL; 1	**VIR**; 1	**VIR**; 1		**RAM**; 1	**RAM**; 1	**TRD**; 1	**TRD**; 1	**LGS**; 1	**LGS**; 1		**BRA**; 1	**BRA**; 1	**PIT**; 1	**PIT**; 1		**NJR**; 1	**NJR**; 1	**NJR**; 1	ALA; 12	ALA; 3	ALA; 1			1st	445
2022	SuperBike	Yamaha	**TEX**; DNS	**TEX**; 3	**ATL**; Ret	**ATL**; 1		**VIR**; 1	**VIR**; 1	**RAM**; 5	**RAM**; 4	**TRD**; 1	**TRD**; 1	LGS; 1	LGS; 1		**BRA**; 1	**BRA**; Ret		**PIT**; 1	**PIT**; 1		NJR; 1	NJR; 1		**ALA**; 3	**ALA**; 1	1st	376
2023	SuperBike	Yamaha	**ATL**; 2	**ATL**; 1	**ALA**; 1	**ALA**; 1		RAM; Ret	RAM; 3	TRD; 1	TRD; 2	LGS; 1	LGS; 2	LGS; 3	BRA; 1	BRA; 2	PIT; 1	PIT; 1	PIT; 1	**TEX**; 1	TEX; DSQ		NJR; 1	NJR; 4				1st	420
2024	SuperBike	Yamaha	ATL; 2	ATL; 1	ALA; 2	ALA; 8	ALA; 7	RAM; 2	RAM; 5	BRA; 8	BRA; 7	RID; 2	RID; 9		MON; 5	MON; 5	OHI; 9	OHI; 10		TEX	TEX	TEX	NJR	NJR				7th	192
2025	SuperBike	Yamaha	ALA; 3	ALA; 1	ATL; 2	ATL; 5		RAM; 4	RAM; 8	**RID**; 3	RID; 3	MON; 3	MON; 5	MON; 4	VIR; 5	VIR; 5	OHI	OHI		TEX	TEX		NJE	NJE				4th*	187*

Sporting positions
Preceded by Jakub Kornfeil	Red Bull MotoGP Rookies Cup champion 2010	Succeeded by Lorenzo Baldassarri
