= 2019 MotoAmerica Supersport Championship =

The 2019 MotoAmerica Supersport Championship season was the 5th season of the supersport class of motorcycle racing within the MotoAmerica series. J.D. Beach entered the season as the defending champion.

== Calendar and results ==
Round	Circuit	Date	Race 1 Winner	Race 2 Winner
1	(Georgia (U.S. state)) Road Atlanta	April 5–7	(United States) Hayden Gillim	(United States) Bobby Fong
	(Texas) Circuit of the Americas	April 12–14	(No Event)	(No Event)
2	Virginia International Raceway	May 3–5	(United States) PJ Jacobsen	(United States) Hayden Gillim
3	(Wisconsin) Road America	May 31-June 2	(United States) Hayden Gillim	(United States) Bobby Fong
4	Utah Motorsports Campus	June 14–16	(United States) Hayden Gillim	(United States) Bobby Fong
5	(California) Laguna Seca	July 12–14	(United States) Bobby Fong	(No Event)
6	(California) Sonoma Raceway	August 9–11	(United States) Hayden Gillim	(United States) PJ Jacobsen
7	(Pennsylvania) Pittsburgh International Race Complex	August 23–25	(United States) Sean Dylan Kelly	(United States) Sean Dylan Kelly
8	New Jersey Motorsports Park	September 6–8	(United States) PJ Jacobsen	(United States) PJ Jacobsen
9	(Alabama) Barber Motorsports Park	September 20–22	(United States) Bobby Fong	(United States) Bobby Fong

== Teams and riders ==
2020 Entry List
Team	Constructor	No.	Rider	Rounds
2 Wheel Legal - Hudson Motorcycles	Yamaha	54	(Mexico) Richie Escalante	All
Aerojwalk Team	MV Agusta	15	(United States) Jeremiah Walker	2
Altus Motorsports	Suzuki	23	(Brazil) Lucas Silva	All
Altus Motorsports	Suzuki	34	(United States) Danny Eslick	3, 7
Altus Motorsports	Suzuki	59	(United States) Jaret Nassaney	1, 2, 3, 4, 5, 8, 9
ART Performance	Suzuki	45	(United States) Fernando Silva	9
ART Performance	Suzuki	90	(Brazil) Bruno Silva	9
AS17 Racing	Honda	36	(United States) Brad Saenz	8
BARTCON Racing/Farrell Performance	Kawasaki	34	(United States) Danny Eslick	3, 7
Blackall Racing	Yamaha	11	(United States) Tony Blackall	3, 9
Catalyst Reaction Suspension/FeelLikeAPro.com	Yamaha	25	(United States) Michael Kim	6
Celtic HSBK Racing	Yamaha	99	(United States) PJ Jacobsen	All
Clutchnup Racing	Yamaha	42	(United States) Andrew Bowen	1
Cock Racing	Yamaha	89	(United States) Garrett O'Brien	9
CV28 Racing	Yamaha	28	(United States) Cory Ventura	3, 4, 5, 6, 7, 8, 9
Cycle Gear Racing	Yamaha	52	(United States) Nolan Lamkin	All
Envy Racing	Yamaha	64	(Cuba) Max Angles	2, 9
EZ Racing	Yamaha	27	(Mexico) Edgar Zaragoza	1, 2, 5, 6, 7, 8, 9
Floyd's of Leadville	Kawasaki	29	(United States) Tyler Ohara	6
FSI/Farrell Performance	Kawasaki	66	(United States) Patrick Coleman	3
Honos	Yamaha	72	(Mexico) Carlos Abraham Garcia	2, 3, 4, 5, 6, 7
Hudson Motorcycles	Yamaha	54	(Mexico) Richie Escalante	All
Impact Racing	Yamaha	98	(United States) Jeremy Simmons	All
Karns Performance Racing	Kawasaki	84	(United States) Timothy Wilson	7
KMS Racing	Yamaha	75	(United States) Caleb Odom	9
Lamchop Racing	Triumph	68	(United States) Andrew Lamoureux	7, 9
LaRoche Racing	Yamaha	20	(United States) CJ LaRoche	7
Limitless Racing	Yamaha	48	(United States) Joseph Giannotto	1, 2
M4 ECSTAR Suzuki	Suzuki	40	(United States) Sean Dylan Kelly	All
M4 ECSTAR Suzuki	Suzuki	50	(United States) Bobby Fong	All
Mosites Motorsports	Kawasaki	57	(United States) Gary Yancoskie	7
Motohana/Raceworx USA	Yamaha	13	(United States) Aaron Graham	1, 2, 3, 4, 5, 6, 9
Mountain Autosport	Kawasaki	55	(United States) Jason Johnson	4
MP13 Racing	Yamaha	4	(United States) Joshua Hayes	2, 3, 4, 5, 6, 8
MP13 Racing	Yamaha	12	(United States) Hunter Dunham	7
N2 Racing	Yamaha	24	(United States) Xavier Zayat	1, 2, 3, 6, 7, 8, 9
New Century	Honda	36	(United States) Brad Saenz	8
New Century Racing	Yamaha	32	(Japan) Mitsu Ueda	5
OB-Racing	Yamaha	89	(United States) Garrett O'Brien	9
Omega Moto	Yamaha	28	(United States) Cory Ventura	3, 4, 5, 6, 7, 8, 9
Ortt Racing	Kawasaki	30	(Canada) Braeden Ortt	All
Outlaw Racing	Yamaha	94	(United States) Mookie Wilkerson	5, 6
Rickdiculous Racing	Yamaha	18	(United States) Nick McFadden	All
Rickdiculous Racing	Yamaha	69	(United States) Hayden Gillim	All
RiderzLaw/Aguilar Racing	Yamaha	96	(United States) Jason Aguilar	All
RiderzLaw/BrotoGP Racing	Yamaha	31	(United States) Robert Pierce	4, 5, 6, 9
Roaring Toyz	Kawasaki	33	(United States) Robert Fisher	2
Shelby Phoenix Racing	Yamaha	97	(United States) Connor Funk	5
Speed Factory	Kawasaki	39	(Canada) Nicolas Munier	8
Super C Racing	Yamaha	60	(United States) Carl Soltisz	3
Team Norris Racing	Yamaha	43	(Norway) Caroline Olsen	1, 2, 3, 4, 5, 6
Team Norris Racing	Yamaha	88	(United States) Benjamin Smith	1, 2, 3, 4, 5, 6, 7, 8
Team Velocity Racing	Yamaha	79	(United States) Chuck Ivey	9
Thermiotis Racing	Yamaha	78	(Venezuela) Alejandro Thermiotis	All
Tomas Casas Racing	Yamaha	81	(Canada) Tomas Casas	7
TSE Racing	Yamaha	21	(United States) Brandon Paasch	3
Tuned Racing	Yamaha	30	(Canada) Braeden Ortt	All
Tuned Racing	Yamaha	74	(United States) Bryce Prince	All
West Side Performance Racing	Yamaha	80	(United States) Christian Miranda	9
Yates Racing	Yamaha	22	(United States) Ashton Yates	1, 2, 3, 4

== Championship standings ==
=== Riders' championship ===
Scoring system

Points are awarded to the top fifteen finishers. A rider has to finish the race to earn points.

Position	1st	2nd	3rd	4th	5th	6th	7th	8th	9th	10th	11th	12th	13th	14th	15th
Points	25	20	16	13	11	10	9	8	7	6	5	4	3	2	1

Pos	Rider	Bike	RAT (Georgia (U.S. state))		VIR (Virginia)		RAM (Wisconsin)		UMC (Utah)		MON (California)	SON (California)		PIT (Pennsylvania)		NJE (New Jersey)		BAR (Alabama)		Pts
Pos	Rider	Bike	R1	R2	R1	R2	R1	R2	R1	R2	R1	R1	R2	R1	R2	R1	R2	R1	R2	Pts
1	(United States) Bobby Fong	Suzuki	2	1		Ret	2	1	2	1	1	2	2	Ret	2	2	2	1	1	310
2	(United States) PJ Jacobsen	Yamaha	6	2	1	8	Ret	4	5	3	2	3	1	2	3	1	1	7	3	275
3	(United States) Hayden Gillim	Yamaha	1	10	DNS	1	1	3	1	2	Ret	1	4	3	4	Ret	3	4	6	248
4	(United States) Sean Dylan Kelly	Suzuki	3	6	DNS	3	3	2	4	5	4	Ret	6	1	1	3	Ret	5	4	215
5	(Mexico) Richie Escalante	Yamaha	4	3	2	7	4	6	3	6	3	7	12	10	5	4	6	3	2	212
6	(United States) Bryce Prince	Yamaha	5	5	4	19	5	7	6	4	6	4	3	15	6	Ret	4	2	Ret	161
7	(United States) Nick McFadden	Yamaha	10	11	8	5	8	9	9	9	8	8	8	4	7	5	8	9	5	142
8	(United States) Jason Aguilar	Yamaha	7	4	5	12	10	23	11	8	7	6	7	9	10	10	9	8	7	127
9	(United States) Joshua Hayes	Yamaha			3	2	6	8	7	7	5	5	5			Ret	5			116
10	(Canada) Braeden Ortt	Kawasaki	Ret	8	6	10	11	11	8	11	DNS	11	Ret	6	12	7	7	10	16	90
11	(Brazil) Lucas Silva	Suzuki	9	12	7	11	15	16	10	10	9	9	10	8	8	Ret	Ret	11	8	87
12	(United States) Cory Ventura	Yamaha					12	14	14	13	Ret	10	9	5	14	9	Ret	6	Ret	54
13	(United States) Xavier Zayat	Yamaha	8	7	Ret	4	Ret					Ret	Ret	14	13	6	Ret	Ret		45
14	(United States) Jaret Nassaney	Suzuki	Ret	14	11	14	22	13	13	12	11					14	12	Ret	10	36
15	(United States) Nolan Lamkin	Yamaha	13	15	15	15	Ret	17	Ret	19	13	17	15	13	17	11	10	12	9	35
16	(United States) Benjamin Smith	Yamaha	Ret	Ret	13	Ret	Ret	15	17	20	12	12	Ret	7	11	8	Ret			34
17	(United States) Ashton Yates	Yamaha	Ret	9	10	9	16	12	12	15										29
18	(United States) Danny Eslick	Suzuki					9	10						11	9					25
19	(United States) Brandon Paasch	Yamaha					7	5												20
20	(United States) Joseph Giannotto	Yamaha	11	13	9	13														18
21	(Venezuela) Alejandro Thermiotis	Yamaha	14	16	Ret	17	18	20	Ret	17	Ret	14	16	21	18	12	11	DNS	12	17
22	(Mexico) Carlos Abraham Garcia	Yamaha			12	16	20		15	14	Ret	13	13	12	16					17
23	(Norway) Caroline Olsen	Yamaha	15	Ret	14	21	14	18	16	16	10	16	Ret							11
24	(Cuba) Max Angles	Yamaha			DNS	6												Ret	Ret	10
25	(United States) Christian Miranda	Yamaha																13	11	8
26	(Mexico) Edgar Zaragoza	Yamaha	16	17	Ret	Ret					17	15	14	19	20	15	14	DNS		6
27	(United States) Aaron Graham	Yamaha	12	Ret	DNS	18	19	19	18	22	15	20	18					16	Ret	5
28	(United States) Tyler Ohara	Kawasaki										Ret	11							5
29	(United States) Chuck Ivey	Yamaha																15	13	4
30	(United States) Brad Saenz	Honda														13	Ret			3
31	(United States) Carl Soltisz	Yamaha					13	Ret												3
32	(Canada) Nicolas Munier	Kawasaki														DSQ	13			3
33	(United States) Robert Pierce	Yamaha							19	18	14	18	19					19	DNS	2
34	(United States) Andrew Lamoureux	Triumph												22	22			DNS	14	2
35	(United States) Caleb Odom	Yamaha																14	20	2
36	(Brazil) Bruno Silva	Suzuki																17	15	1
37	(Canada) Tomas Casas	Yamaha												17	15					1
38	(United States) Jeremy Simmons	Yamaha	17	18	17	20	21	22	20	21	19	21	Ret	18	21	16	15	21	17	1
39	(United States) Tony Blackall	Yamaha					Ret	Ret										Ret	DNS	0
40	(United States) Hunter Dunham	Yamaha												20	DNS					0
41	(United States) Jeremiah Walker	MV Agusta			DNS	DNS														0
42	(United States) Robert Fisher	Kawasaki			16	Ret														0
43	(United States) CJ LaRoche	Yamaha												16						0
44	(United States) Mookie Wilkerson	Yamaha									16	19	17							0
45	(United States) Fernando Silva	Suzuki																18	18	0
46	(United States) Connor Funk	Yamaha									18									0
47	(United States) Garrett O'Brien	Yamaha																20	19	0
48	(United States) Gary Yancoskie	Kawasaki												Ret	19					0
49	(United States) Andrew Bowen	Yamaha	18	19																0
50	(United States) Michael Kim	Yamaha										22	20							0
51	(Japan) Mitsu Ueda	Yamaha									20									0
52	(United States) Patrick Coleman	Kawasaki					17	21												0
53	(United States) Timothy Wilson	Kawasaki												23	23					0
54	(United States) Jason Johnson	Kawasaki							21	23										0
Pos	Rider	Bike	RAT (Georgia (U.S. state))		VIR (Virginia)		RAM (Wisconsin)		UMC (Utah)		MON (California)	SON (California)		PIT (Pennsylvania)		NJE (New Jersey)		BAR (Alabama)		Pts
