= The Ridge Motorsports Park =

Motorsport track in the United States

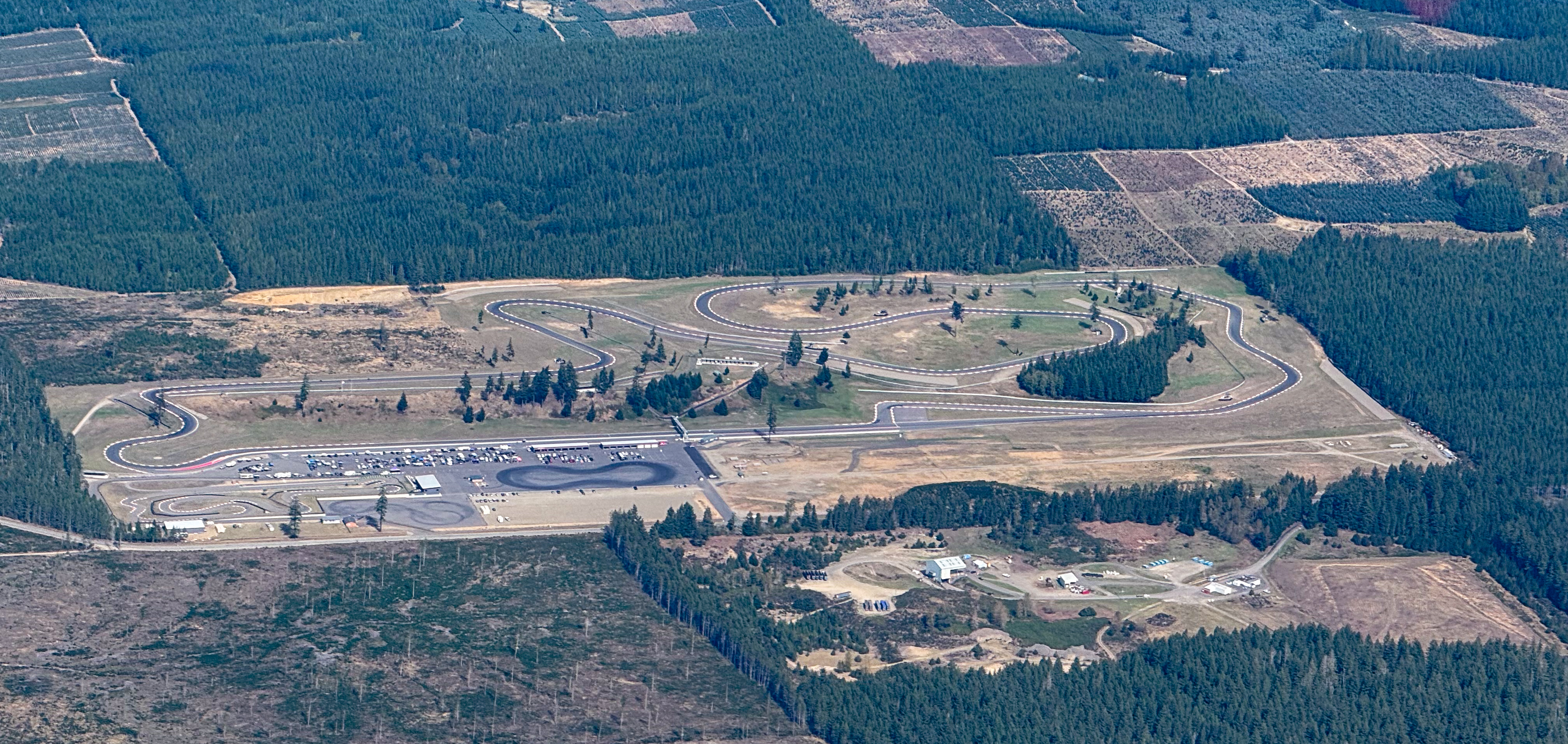
- Oblique view of the Ridge Motorsports Park
- Location: 1060 West Eells Hill Road, Shelton, Washington, United States
- Coordinates: 47°15′20.41″N 123°11′25.01″W
- Owner: Joe Manke and Rusty Gill
- Operator: Tracie Schmitt
- Broke ground: 26 April 2011; 15 years ago
- Opened: 26 May 2012; 14 years ago
- Architect: Steve Crawford
- Major events: Current: MotoAmerica (2020–present); Former: Trans-Am Series West (2021–2023)

Full Circuit (2014–present)
- Surface: Asphalt/Concrete
- Length: 2.470 mi (3.975 km)
- Turns: 16
- Race lap record: 1:31.421 ( (Canada) Mark Uhlmann, Stohr WF1, 2023, Sports car racing)

Full Circuit with Chicane (2020–present)
- Surface: Asphalt/Concrete
- Length: 2.500 mi (4.023 km)
- Turns: 18
- Race lap record: 1:39.633 ( (United States) Cameron Beaubier, BMW S1000RR, 2023, Superbike)

The Ridge Motorsports Park is a racetrack located in Shelton, Washington, United States, approximately 25 mi (40 km) northwest of Olympia. It has hosted MotoAmerica national races, regional car and motorcycle sanctioning bodies, track days, and other events.

The full road course is 2.470 mi (3.975 km) long, with 16 turns and a change in elevation of more than 300 ft (91 m) from start to finish.

== History ==
Ground was broken for the Steve Crawford designed road course on 26 April 2011.

The first event at "The Ridge" was a charity event benefitting local Mason County food banks, held on 10–11 December 2011.

The first official race, a Washington Motorcycle Road Racing Association - WMRRA event, was held on 26 May 2012.

For the 2014 season, turn 13 of the original road circuit was reconfigured to mitigate excessive surface degradation, and the terrain surrounding the road circuit underwent an enormous amount of grading and smoothing prior to the application of topsoil and hydro-seeding, to both enhance the appearance of the facility and to manage runoff. New poured in place concrete barrier walls were constructed to replace temporary barriers, curbing was added in several places and additional new paving was completed. Finally, a large spectator viewing area was created on the upper part of the site.

In 2015, an outdoor scale replica kart track was added to the site, named "Olympic Grand Prix", or "OGP". OGP is a 1/5th scale replica of the road circuit, including elevation change. Additionally for 2015, the available paved paddock area was nearly doubled in size.

For 2016, electrical power and water systems were brought on line and a bathroom & shower building was completed. Construction of a new motocross facility called "Ridge MX", also began in the spring of 2016, with initial test laps being run on 6 May 2016. An invitational pre-grand opening test event was held on 1 October 2016 and the official grand opening was held on 29 October 2016.

In 2020, The Ridge Motorsports park added a chicane to the 2,850 ft (870 m) front straight to slow down superbikes ahead of its inaugural MotoAmerica event on June 26–28. Use of the chicane is optional for each sanctioning body and track day organizer.

== Lap records ==
=== Official lap records ===
As of June 2025, the fastest officially timed lap records at The Ridge Motorsports Park are listed as:

Category	Time	Driver	Vehicle	Event	Date
Full Circuit (2014–present): 2.500 mi (4.023 km)
Sports car racing	1:31.421	Mark Uhlmann	Stohr WF1	Global Time Attack 2023 Round 2	July 23, 2023
Trans-Am	1:38.392	Brody Goble	Ford Mustang Trans-Am	2022 The Ridge Trans-Am West Coast round	June 12, 2022
Full Circuit with Chicane (2020–present): 2.500 mi (4.023 km)
Superbike	1:39.663	Cameron Beaubier	BMW S1000RR	2023 The Ridge MotoAmerica round	June 25, 2023
Supersport	1:42.308	Tyler Scott	Suzuki GSX-R600	2025 The Ridge MotoAmerica round	June 28, 2025
Twins Cup	1:46.026	Alessandro Di Mario	Aprilia RS 660	2025 The Ridge MotoAmerica round	June 29, 2025
Supersport 300	1:52.650	Tyler Scott	KTM RC 390 R	2021 The Ridge MotoAmerica round	June 26, 2021

=== Unofficial lap records ===
Driver	Configuration	Time	Vehicle Type	Vehicle	Event	Date
Jake Gagne	Chicane	1:39.145	1000cc Motorcycle	2020 Yamaha YZF-R1	2022 Dynapac MotoAmerica Superbikes at The Ridge	June 26, 2022
Rocco Landers	Chicane	1:42.774	600cc Motorcycle	2020 Yamaha YZF-R6	2022 Dynapac MotoAmerica Superbikes at The Ridge	June 26, 2022
Adam Robarts	No Chicane	1:37.79	1000cc Motorcycle	2017 BMW S1000RR	2019 WMRRA Round 4	August 17, 2019
Adam Robarts	No Chicane	1:39.939	600cc Motorcycle	2019 Kawasaki Ninja ZX-6R	2019 WMRRA Round 4	August 17, 2019
Cable Rosenberg	No Chicane	1:37.058	Sports Car	2013 Dodge SRT Viper GTS	2021 Global Time Attack	April 5, 2021

=== Pre 2014 lap records ===
Driver	Configuration	Time	Vehicle Type	Vehicle	Event	Date
Eric Johnson	No Chicane	1:42:932	Kart	KTM	-	June 22, 2013
Miles Jackson	No Chicane	1:32.962	C Sports Racer	JFC Racing Stohr CSR	2013 NW Region SCCA Romp on the Ridge Return	July 28,2013* pre-2014 configuration
