= Superbikes at Texas =

Championship of Texas

MotoAmerica
- Venue: Circuit of the Americas
- First race: 2015
- Most wins (rider): Toni Elías (6)
- Most wins (team): Yoshimura Suzuki Factory Racing (6)
- Most wins (manufacturer): Suzuki (11)

The MotoAmerica Superbikes at Texas is a MotoAmerica race event that was held for the first time in the 2015 season at Circuit of the Americas (COTA). For the first several years, it was the first or second race weekend on the MotoAmerica schedule. MotoGP and MotoAmerica raced during the same weekend at COTA from 2015-2019.

The 2020 and 2021 race events were cancelled due to the outbreak of COVID-19.

The following year, it was named “MotoAmerica Superbikes at Texas” and has been named like that since 2022. MotoAmerica was added as a support event for the MotoGP weekend and it was called “MotoAmerica King Of The Baggers at MotoGP” and this year, MotoAmerica was once again added as support event for the MotoGP weekend but was called “MotoAmerica Talent Cup at MotoGP”.

== Official names and sponsors ==
- 2015-2016: "MotoAmerica Superbike Championship of Texas"
- 2017: "MotoAmerica Championship of Texas"
- 2018-2019: "Championship of Texas"
- 2022–present: "MotoAmerica Superbikes at Texas"

== Winners of the Superbikes at Texas ==
=== Multiple winners (riders) ===
# Wins	Rider	Wins	
# Wins	Rider	Category	Years won
6	(Spain) Toni Elías	Superbike	2016 (Race 1 & 2), 2017 (Race 1 & 2), 2018 (Race 2)
4	(California) Bobby Fong	Superstock 1000	2016 (Race 1 & 2), 2017 (Race 1 & 2)
2	(California) Jake Gagne	Superstock 1000	2015 (Race 1 & 2)
2	(Washington (state)) J. D. Beach	Supersport	2015 (Race 1), 2017 (Race 1)
2	(Italy) Danilo Petrucci	Superbike	2022 (Race 1), 2022 (Race 2)

=== Multiple winners (manufacturers) ===
# Wins	Manufacturer	Wins	
# Wins	Manufacturer	Category	Years won
11	(Japan) Suzuki	Superbike	2016 (Race 1 & 2), 2017 (Race 1 & 2), 2018 (Race 2), 2019 (Race 1 & 2), 2023 (Race 2), 2024 (Race 1)
11	(Japan) Suzuki	Superstock 1000	2023 (Race 1 & 2)
11	(Japan) Suzuki	Supersport	2023 (Race 1)
10	(Japan) Yamaha	Superbike	2016 (Race 1 & 2), 2017 (Race 1 & 2), 2018 (Race 2) 2023 (Race 1)
10	(Japan) Yamaha	Superstock 1000	2015 (Race 1 & 2)
10	(Japan) Yamaha	Supersport	2015 (Race 1), 2016 (Race 1), 2017 (Race 1)
4	(Japan) Kawasaki	Superstock 1000	2016 (Race 1 & 2), 2017 (Race 1 & 2)
4	(Italy) Ducati	Superbike	2022 (Race 1 & 2), 2023 (Race 2)
4	(Italy) Ducati	Supersport	2023 (Race 1)
3	(Germany) BMW	Superbike	2024 (Race 1, 2 & 3)

=== By year ===
Note: Results are by order from Supersport to Superbike. 2015/2016 Superstock 1000 results are not available on PDF.

Year	Track	Supersport		Superstock 1000		Superbike		Report
Year	Track	Rider	Manufacturer	Rider	Manufacturer	Rider	Manufacturer	Report
2024	Circuit of the Americas	(Kentucky) Jake Lewis	Suzuki	Not held	Not held	(California) Cameron Beaubier	BMW	
2024	Circuit of the Americas	(South Africa) Mathew Scholtz	Yamaha	Not held	Not held	(Florida) Sean Dylan Kelly	BMW	
2024	Circuit of the Americas	Not held	Not held	Not held	Not held	(California) Cameron Beaubier	BMW	
2023	Circuit of the Americas	(Spain) Xavi Fores	Ducati	(Kentucky) Hayden Gillim	Suzuki	(California) Jake Gagne	Yamaha	
2023	Circuit of the Americas	(Pennsylvania) Tyler Scott	Suzuki	(Kentucky) Hayden Gillim	Suzuki	(California) Josh Herrin	Ducati	
2022	Circuit of the Americas	Not held	Not held	Not held	Not held	(Italy) Danilo Petrucci	Ducati	
2022	Circuit of the Americas	Not held	Not held	Not held	Not held	(Italy) Danilo Petrucci	Ducati	
2021	Circuit of the Americas	Cancelled due to COVID-19 concerns						
2020	Circuit of the Americas	Cancelled due to COVID-19 concerns						
2019	Circuit of the Americas	Not held	Not held	Not held	Not held	(Spain) Toni Elías	Suzuki	
2019	Circuit of the Americas	Not held	Not held	Not held	Not held	(California) Josh Herrin	Suzuki	
2018	Circuit of the Americas	Not held	Not held	Not held	Not held	(South Africa) Mathew Scholtz	Yamaha	
2018	Circuit of the Americas	Not held	Not held	Not held	Not held	(Spain) Toni Elías	Suzuki	
2017	Circuit of the Americas	(Washington (state)) J. D. Beach	Yamaha	(California) Bobby Fong	Kawasaki	(Spain) Toni Elías	Suzuki	
2017	Circuit of the Americas	Not held	Not held	(California) Bobby Fong	Kawasaki	(Spain) Toni Elías	Suzuki	
2016	Circuit of the Americas	(Texas) Garrett Gerloff	Yamaha	(California) Bobby Fong	Kawasaki	(Spain) Toni Elías	Suzuki	
2016	Circuit of the Americas	Not held	Not held	(California) Bobby Fong	Kawasaki	(Spain) Toni Elías	Suzuki	
2015	Circuit of the Americas	(Washington (state)) J. D. Beach	Yamaha	(California) Jake Gagne	Yamaha	(Mississippi) Josh Hayes	Yamaha	
2015	Circuit of the Americas	Not held	Not held	(California) Jake Gagne	Yamaha	(California) Cameron Beaubier	Yamaha	

=== By year ===
Note: Super Hooligans Race 2 section is the Race B Main results.

Year	Track	King of the Baggers		Super Hooligan		Twins Cup		Report
Year	Track	Rider	Manufacturer	Rider	Manufacturer	Rider	Manufacturer	Report
2023	Circuit of the Americas	(New York (state)) Kyle Wyman	Harley-Davidson	(California) Tyler O'Hara	Indian Motorcycle	Not Held	Not Held	
2023	Circuit of the Americas	(New Hampshire) James Rispoli	Harley-Davidson	* (Texas) Lucas Geboo	Harley-Davidson	Not Held	Not Held	
2023	Circuit of the Americas	Not Held	Not Held	(California) Tyler O'Hara	Indian Motorcycle	Not Held	Not Held	
2024	Circuit of the Americas	(California) Rocco Landers	Indian Motorcycle	(Australia) Troy Herfoss	Indian Motorcycle	(Kentucky) Alessandro Di Mario	Aprilia	
2024	Circuit of the Americas	(Australia) Troy Herfoss	Indian Motorcycle	(California) Tyler O'Hara	Indian Motorcycle	(Kentucky) Alessandro Di Mario	Aprilia	
2024	Circuit of the Americas	Not Held	Not Held	Not Held	Not Held	Not Held	Not Held	

=== By year ===
Year	Track	King of the Baggers at MotoGP		Report
Year	Track	Rider	Manufacturer	Report
2024	Circuit of the Americas	(Australia) Troy Herfoss	Indian Motorcycle	
2024	Circuit of the Americas	(New York (state)) Kyle Wyman	Harley-Davidson	

=== By year ===
Year	Track	Talent Cup		Report
Year	Track	Rider	Manufacturer	Report
2025	Circuit of the Americas	(Kentucky) Alessandro Di Mario	Krämer Motorcycles	
2025	Circuit of the Americas	(Australia) Bodie Paige	Krämer Motorcycles	
