= 2021 MotoAmerica Superstock 1000 Championship =

The 2021 MotoAmerica Superstock 1000 Championship season was the 7th season of the Stock 1000 class of motorcycle racing within the MotoAmerica series. Cameron Petersen entered the season as the defending champion, but vacated the class to race for the M4 ECSTAR Suzuki Team in the MotoAmerica Superbike class in 2021.

== Calendar and results ==
Round	Circuit	Date	Race 1 Winner	Race 2 Winner
1	(Georgia (U.S. state)) Road Atlanta	April 30-May 2	(United States) Michael Gilbert	(United States) Travis Wyman
2	Virginia	May 21–23	(United States) Jake Lewis	(United States) Corey Alexander
3	(Wisconsin) Road America	June 11–13	(United States) Jake Lewis	No event
4	(Washington (state)) The Ridge	June 25–27	(United States) Corey Alexander	(United States) Corey Alexander
5	(California) Monterey	July 9–11	(United States) Travis Wyman	No event
6	(Minnesota) Brainerd	July 30-August 1	(United States) Jake Lewis	No event
7	(Pennsylvania) Pittsburgh	August 13–15	(United States) Jake Lewis	No event
8	New Jersey	September 10–12	(United States) Jake Lewis	No event
9	Alabama	September 17–19	(United States) Jake Lewis	No event

== Teams and riders ==
2021 Entry List
Team	Constructor	No.	Rider	Rounds
369 Racing	BMW	74	(United States) Aaron Risinger	3, 5, 7
3R TEAM Racing	Yamaha	227	(Colombia) Rigo Salazar	2
4 Wheel Specialty	BMW	39	(United States) Volga Mermut	4
4 Wheel Specialty	BMW	820	(United States) Kevin Nanthrup	4
AGVSPORT MonkeyMoto	Yamaha	72	(United Kingdom) Steven Shakespeare	1–4, 6-9
AGVSPORT MonkeyMoto	Yamaha	720	(United States) Mike Boyce	9
Altus Motorsports	Suzuki	85	(United States) Jake Lewis	All
Apex Assassins Redline Racing	Kawasaki	299	(United States) Jack Bakken	5
APRacing62	Kawasaki	629	(United States) Alan Phillips	9
Black Ice Racing	Yamaha	117	(United States) Lindsay McGregor	
BobbleHeadMoto	Yamaha	503	(United States) Emerson Amaya	7
BPR Tuning	Yamaha	70	(United States) Bryce Prince	5
Bravo Zulu Racing	BMW	151	(United States) Gregory Ludt	1
Cha Cha Cha Motorsports	Kawasaki	153	(United States) Terry Heard	5
Chuckwalla Valley Raceway/Octane Lending	Kawasaki	55	(United States) Michael Gilbert	All
Clonnabis LLC Racing	Yamaha	73	(Brazil) Sebastiao Ferreira	5
Cool Breeze Racing	Kawasaki	134	(United States) Joe Brown	
Crown Rally/Epic Wraps/Centaur Racing R1	Yamaha	970	(United States) Scott Masterton	6
Custom Speed and Fab Racing	Yamaha	111	(United States) Chad Tieszen	
D.A.M. Fast Racing	Yamaha	865	(United States) Jonathan McCroskey	7
Davies Racing	Yamaha	707	(United States) Bobby Davies	9
Disrupt Racing	Yamaha	44	(United States) Mark Heckles	8
Double A Racing	Aprilia	312	(United States) Aaron Ascher	5
Edge Racing	BMW	960	(United States) Jason Waters	1, 2, 4–7, 9
Edge Racing	Kawasaki	990	(United States) Jesse Ruehling	1, 2, 5, 7, 9
ESBK Racing	Yamaha	175	(United States) Gary Virgin	1, 2, 9
Evans Racing	Suzuki	125	(United States) Brian Evans	5
EZ Racing	Kawasaki	59	(Mexico) Ivan Muñoz	4, 5, 9
EZ Racing	Yamaha	27	(Mexico) Edgar Zaragoza	1, 8
Farnsworth	Kawasaki	343	(United States) Wes Farnsworth	5
FAST Motosports	Kawasaki	179	(United States) Chris Bettis	1
Franklin Armory/Disrupt Racing	Kawasaki	86	(United States) Jason Farrell	3, 6
Franklin Armory/Disrupt Racing	Kawasaki	14	(United States) Andrew Lee	All
Geoff May Racing/VisionWheel.com	Honda	99	(United States) Geoff May	1, 2, 3, 9
HONOS HVMC Racing	Kawasaki	23	(United States) Corey Alexander	All
Hunter Dunham Racing	Yamaha	19	(United States) Hunter Dunham	All
Impact Racing	Yamaha	98	(United States) Jeremy Simmons	1–7, 9
Innovative Motorsports	Kawasaki	124	(United States) Scott Briody	All
Innovative Motorsports	Kawasaki	518	(Panama) Erasmo Pinilla	1–3, 5, 7, 9
Innovative Motorsports	Kawasaki	197	(United States) Teagg Hobbs	3
Jeremy Cook Racing	BMW	81	(United States) Jeremy Cook	1, 2, 4, 5, 8, 9
John Dunham Racing	Yamaha	816	(United States) John Dunham	2
Jones Honda	Honda	22	(United States) Ashton Yates	All
Josh Gerardot Racing	Kawasaki	84	(United States) Josh Gerardot	7
Lehmans Flooring	Kawasaki	139	(United States) Jesse Lehman	3, 6, 9
Limitless Racing	Kawasaki	48	(United States) Joseph Giannotto	1–3, 5-9
M4 ECSTAR Suzuki	Suzuki	79	(United States) Wyatt Farris	All
Mark Keown Racing	Yamaha	791	(United States) Mark Keown	1, 3, 9
Markbilt Racing	Yamaha	514	(United States) Mike Selpe	8
MESA37 Racing	Kawasaki	37	(United States) Stefano Mesa	2, 3, 6, 7-9
Michael Gilbert	Kawasaki	55	(United States) Michael Gilbert	All
Mountain Autosport	Kawasaki	258	(United States) Jason Johnson	
N2/Escape Racing	Yamaha	298	(United States) Ned Brown	2, 7-9
Nielsen Racing	Kawasaki	473	(United States) Justin Miest	6
PDR Motorsports	Kawasaki	371	(United States) Armando Ferrer	2
Pegram Racing	Ducati	73	(United States) Larry Pegram	3
Pit Lane Moto	BMW	214	(United States) William Richardson	2
RealBeal Racing	Ducati	317	(United States) Scott Beal	3
Red Lobo Racing	Kawasaki	20	(United States) Manuel Segura	6, 9
Redline Moto	Kawasaki	824	(United States) Robert Loose Jr	2, 3
Redline-Moto Racing	Yamaha	43	(United States) Michael Butler	1–4, 6, 7, 9
Redline-Moto Racing	Yamaha	108	(United States) Zachary Butler	1–7, 9
Ridge Motorsports Park/DiBrino Racing	Kawasaki	62	(United States) Andy DiBrino	4, 5
S2G Racing	BMW	164	(United States) Cody Cochran	2, 4, 5
Sasquatch Racing	Yamaha	114	(United States) P.R. Stafki	6
Schmotter Motion Racing	Yamaha	26	(United States) Jake Schmotter	3, 6
Speed Monkey Racing	BMW	42	(United States) Jeremy Coffey	All
Tango Racing	Kawasaki	69	(Argentina) Mauricio H Hidalgo	1, 2, 4, 7
Tango Racing	Kawasaki	71	(Uruguay) Maximiliano Gerardo	1–5, 7
Team Germany by TSE Racing	BMW	119	(Germany) Stefan Dolipski	3
Team Kok Racing	Kawasaki	228	(United States) Samuel Kok	3
Team Posse	Ducati	562	(United States) Jeremiah Walker	2
Team Posse	Yamaha	979	(United States) Mike Applegate	9
Team Posse	Yamaha	301	(United States) Dallas Sherman	3, 5, 6
Tecfil Racing Team	BMW	94	(Brazil) Danilo Lewis	1–4, 6-9
TheHomeProZ Racing Team	Kawasaki	78	(United States) Chad Lewin	5
Toby K Racing	Suzuki	75	(United States) Toby Khamsouk	9
Top Pro Motorsports	BMW	103	(United States) Alex Arango	9
Travis Wyman Racing	BMW	10	(United States) Travis Wyman	All
Tytlers Cycle	Ducati	90	(United States) Zachary Schumacher	3
Walt Sipp Racing	Yamaha	41	(United States) Walt Sipp	1
Walz-E Racing	Yamaha	278	(United States) Mitchell Walz	9
WAWA Racing	Kawasaki	161	(Israel) Sahar Zvik	5
West Side Performance Racing	Kawasaki	192	(United States) Alejandro Nieves Jr	1

== Championship standings ==
Scoring system

Points are awarded to the top fifteen finishers. A rider has to finish the race to earn points.

Position	1st	2nd	3rd	4th	5th	6th	7th	8th	9th	10th	11th	12th	13th	14th	15th
Points	25	20	16	13	11	10	9	8	7	6	5	4	3	2	1

Pos	Rider	Bike	RAT (Georgia (U.S. state))		VIR (Virginia)		RAM (Wisconsin)	RID (Washington (state))		MON (California)	BRA (Minnesota)	PIT (Pennsylvania)	NJE (New Jersey)	ALA (Alabama)	Pts
Pos	Rider	Bike	R1	R2	R1	R2	R1	R1	R2	R1	R1	R1	R1	R1	Pts
1	(United States) Jake Lewis	Suzuki	4	4	1	2	1	2	Ret	3	1	1	1	1	232
2	(United States) Travis Wyman	BMW	3	1	7	5	4	7	3	1	12	2	5	3	175
3	(United States) Corey Alexander	Kawasaki	6	13	2	1	3	1	1	2	5	9	Ret	5	173
4	(United States) Michael Gilbert	Kawasaki	1	6	4	3	7	3	5	6	2	4	9	2	170
5	(United States) Ashton Yates	Honda	2	3	9	7	8	6	2	8	4	7	2	4	153
6	(United States) Andrew Lee	Kawasaki	8	7	5	8	6	5	7	4	6	8	6	Ret	107
7	(United States) Geoff May	Honda	7	2	3	4	2							DNS	78
8	(Brazil) Danilo Lewis	BMW	5	5	DNS	6	Ret	10	4		Ret	5	4	21	75
9	(United States) Wyatt Farris	Suzuki	13	10	8	11	10	9	8	10	7	DNS	10	16	64
10	(Uruguay) Maximiliano Gerardo	Kawasaki	11	12	6	9	11	8	11	9		10			57
11	(United States) Hunter Dunham	Yamaha	9	11	Ret	10	14	DNS	10	12	9	11	11	Ret	47
12	(United States) Stefano Mesa	Kawasaki			DNS	DNS	5				3	6	8	DSQ	45
13	(United States) Joseph Giannotto	Kawasaki	12	9	12	12	13			16	17	12	13	7	38
14	(United States) Andy DiBrino	Kawasaki						4	6	7					32
15	(United States) Jason Waters	BMW	10	8	Ret	Ret		12	12	14	11	DNS		DNS	29
16	(United States) Jeremy Coffey	BMW	14	Ret	Ret	15	Ret	15	9	11	13	DNS	12	DNS	23
17	(United States) Mike Selpe	Yamaha											3		16
18	(United States) Hayden Gillim	Suzuki										3			16
19	(United States) Bryce Prince	Yamaha								5					11
20	(United States) Danny Eslick	Suzuki												6	10
21	(United States) Jake Schmotter	Yamaha					12				10				10
22	(United States) Mark Heckles	Yamaha											7		9
23	(United States) Armando Ferrer	Kawasaki			10	13									9
24	(United States) Alan Phillips	Kawasaki												8	8
25	(United States) Jason Farrell	Kawasaki					Ret				8				8
26	(United States) Zachary Butler	Yamaha	18	19	18	Ret	18	17	17	19	15	15		10	8
27	(United States) Volga Mermut	BMW						11	13						8
28	(United States) Bobby Davies	Yamaha												9	7
29	(United States) Larry Pegram	Ducati					9								7
30	(Colombia) Rigo Salazar	Yamaha			11	14									7
31	(United States) Jeremy Cook	BMW	19	15	13	24		16	16	27			17	14	6
32	(United States) Jesse Ruehling	Kawasaki	17	14	15	16				22		13		17	6
33	(Mexico) Ivan Muñoz	Kawasaki						13	14	21				DNS	5
34	(United States) Alex Arango	BMW												11	5
35	(United Kingdom) Steven Shakespeare	Yamaha	DNS	17	Ret	19	20	14	15		20	17	15	Ret	4
36	(United States) Michael Butler	Yamaha	22	22	17	22	21	19	23		19	21		12	4
37	(United States) Jesse Lehman	Kawasaki					19				Ret			13	3
38	(Brazil) Sebastiao Ferreira	Yamaha								13					3
39	(United States) Jeremy Simmons	Yamaha	15	16	16	17	23	Ret	20	20	16	14		18	3
40	(United States) Ned Brown	Yamaha			Ret	21						16	14	DNS	2
41	(United States) Justin Miest	Kawasaki									14				2
42	(United States) John Dunham	Yamaha			14	18									2
43	(United States) Toby Khamsouk	Suzuki												15	1
44	(United States) Chad Lewin	Kawasaki								15					1
45	(United States) Zachary Schumacher	Ducati					15								1
46	(United States) Mike Boyce	Yamaha												DNS	0
47	(United States) Mike Applegate	Yamaha												DNS	0
48	(United States) Scott Briody	Kawasaki	24	DSQ	19	23	25	Ret	19	Ret	21	18	16	Ret	0
49	(United States) Manuel Segura	Kawasaki									DNS			Ret	0
50	(United States) Gary Virgin	Suzuki	21	DNS	23	27								DNS	0
51	(Mexico) Edgar Zaragoza	Yamaha	DNS	DNS									DNS		0
52	(United States) Emerson Amaya	Yamaha										DSQ			0
53	(United States) Jonathan McCroskey	Yamaha										Ret			0
54	(United States) Aaron Risinger	BMW					16			17		Ret			0
55	(United States) Wes Farnsworth	Kawasaki								Ret					0
56	(United States) Jack Bakken	Kawasaki								Ret					0
57	(Israel) Sahar Zvik	Kawasaki													0
58	(United States) Walt Sipp	Yamaha	16	18											0
59	(United States) Chris Bettis	Kawasaki	DNS	DNS											0
60	(United States) Gregory Ludt	BMW	DNS												0
61	(United States) Teagg Hobbs	Kawasaki					17								0
62	(United States) P.R. Stafki	Yamaha									18				0
63	(United States) George Myshlyayev	Kawasaki								18					0
64	(United States) Steven Campbell	Kawasaki						Ret	18						0
65	(Panama) Erasmo Pinilla	Kawasaki	23	23	24	29	26			29		19		19	0
66	(United States) Mark Keown	Yamaha	25	24			27							20	0
67	(United States) Josh Gerardot	Kawasaki										20			0
68	(United States) Jeremiah Walker	Ducati			20	20									0
69	(United States) Alejandro Nieves Jr	Kawasaki	26	20											0
70	(United States) Kevin Nanthrup	BMW						18	21						0
71	(United States) Mitchell Walz	Yamaha												22	0
72	(Argentina) Mauricio H Hidalgo	Kawasaki	20	21	Ret			Ret	24			22			0
73	(United States) Dallas Sherman	Yamaha					30			23	22				0
74	(United States) Scott Beal	Ducati					22								0
75	(United States) Scott Masterton	Yamaha													0
76	(United States) Terry Heard	Kawasaki								24					0
77	(United States) Robert Loose Jr	Kawasaki			21	26	24								0
78	(United States) Brian Evans	Suzuki								25					0
79	(United States) Aaron Ascher	Aprilia								26					0
80	(United States) Cody Cochran	BMW				25		20	22	28					0
81	(Germany) Stefan Dolipski	BMW					28								0
82	(United States) William Richardson	BMW			22	28									0
83	(United States) Samuel Kok	Kawasaki					29								0
Pos	Rider	Bike	RAT (Georgia (U.S. state))		VIR (Virginia)		RAM (Wisconsin)	RID (Washington (state))		MON (California)	BRA (Minnesota)	PIT (Pennsylvania)	NJE (New Jersey)	ALA (Alabama)	Pts
