= I, Superbiker =

- DVD cover
- Directed by: Mark Sloper
- Produced by: Mark Sloper
- Starring: Tommy Hill; James Ellison; Josh Brookes; Gary Mason
- Music by: David Vanian
- Release date: March 2011
- Running time: 100 minutes
- Country: United Kingdom
- Language: English

I, Superbiker (or I Superbiker) is a 2011 British film documentary directed by film maker and biker Mark Sloper. Inspired by the David Essex film Silver Dream Racer, the film focuses on four contenders for the 2010 British Superbike Championship: Tommy Hill, James Ellison, Josh Brookes and Gary Mason. The film score was written and recorded by David Vanian David Vanian, the frontman of the punk and alternative rock band The Damned. The title track 'I, Superbiker' was written by Phil Collen of Def Leppard with his band Manraze which also features drummer Paul Cook of the Sex Pistols.

I Superbiker was released in UK cinemas in 2011.
