= James Ellison (motorcyclist) =

British motorcycle racer (born 1980)

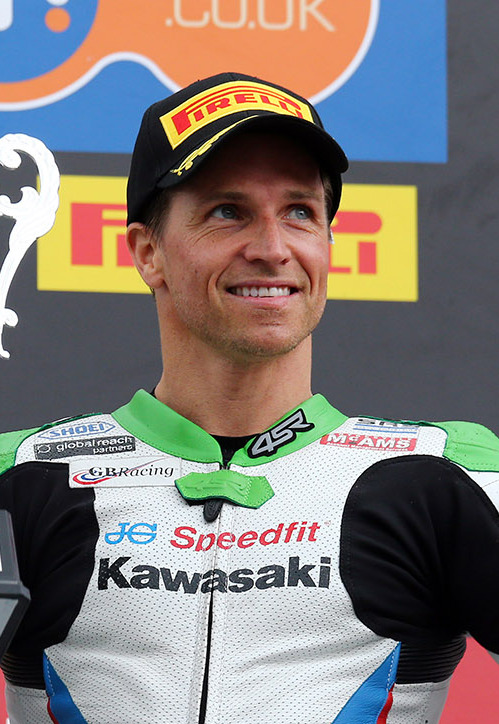
- Ellison in 2015
- Nationality: English
- Born: 19 September 1980 (age 46); Lancaster, Lancashire, England
- Current team: HSO Racing
- Bike number: 77

James Desmond Ellison (born 19 September 1980) is an English motorcycle racer. After two seasons (2017 with McCams and 2018 with Tag) on a Yamaha R1, Ellison was expected to retire at the end of 2018, but in 2019 again competed in the British Superbike Championship series aboard a BMW S1000RR, before parting company with his team half-way through the season in August. He then joined another British Superbike team for the remainder of the 2019 season, starting from the September event at Oulton Park, on the ex-Danny Kent machine, previously an ex-Leon Camier 2016 MV Agusta F4.

After racing during 2013 with Milwaukee Yamaha run by Shaun Muir Racing in British Superbikes, Ellison joined Lloyds British GBMoto team in 2014, and rode a Kawasaki ZX-10R alongside veteran Chris Walker.

Ellison is a double European Superstock champion, World Endurance champion and participated in World Supersport, MotoGP, and the American AMA Superbike series. His brother Dean is a former motorcycle racer.

== Career ==
=== Early career ===
Ellison started racing motorcycles at the age of 15, riding 80 cc machines. After racing in junior championships such as Superteen, he entered the European Superstock series in 1999, winning the title in 2000 and 2001. In 2002, he raced in the Supersport World Championship, before winning the Endurance World Championship in 2003.

=== British Superbike Championship (2004) ===
For 2004, Ellison switched to the British Superbike Championship. He rode a Yamaha YZF-R1 for the privateer Jentin team. He finished 11th overall, and won the privateer cup for independent riders. As well as the British Superbike Championship season, he received two wild-card entries in the Superbike World Championship, at Silverstone and Brands Hatch. Notably, Ellison finished fifth in the second of two races at Brands Hatch.

Towards the end of 2004, Ellison was asked to race for the WCM MotoGP team after their regular rider, Chris Burns, was injured. He finished 13th at Qatar, and the team signed him for the full 2005 season.

=== MotoGP World Championship (2005–2006) ===
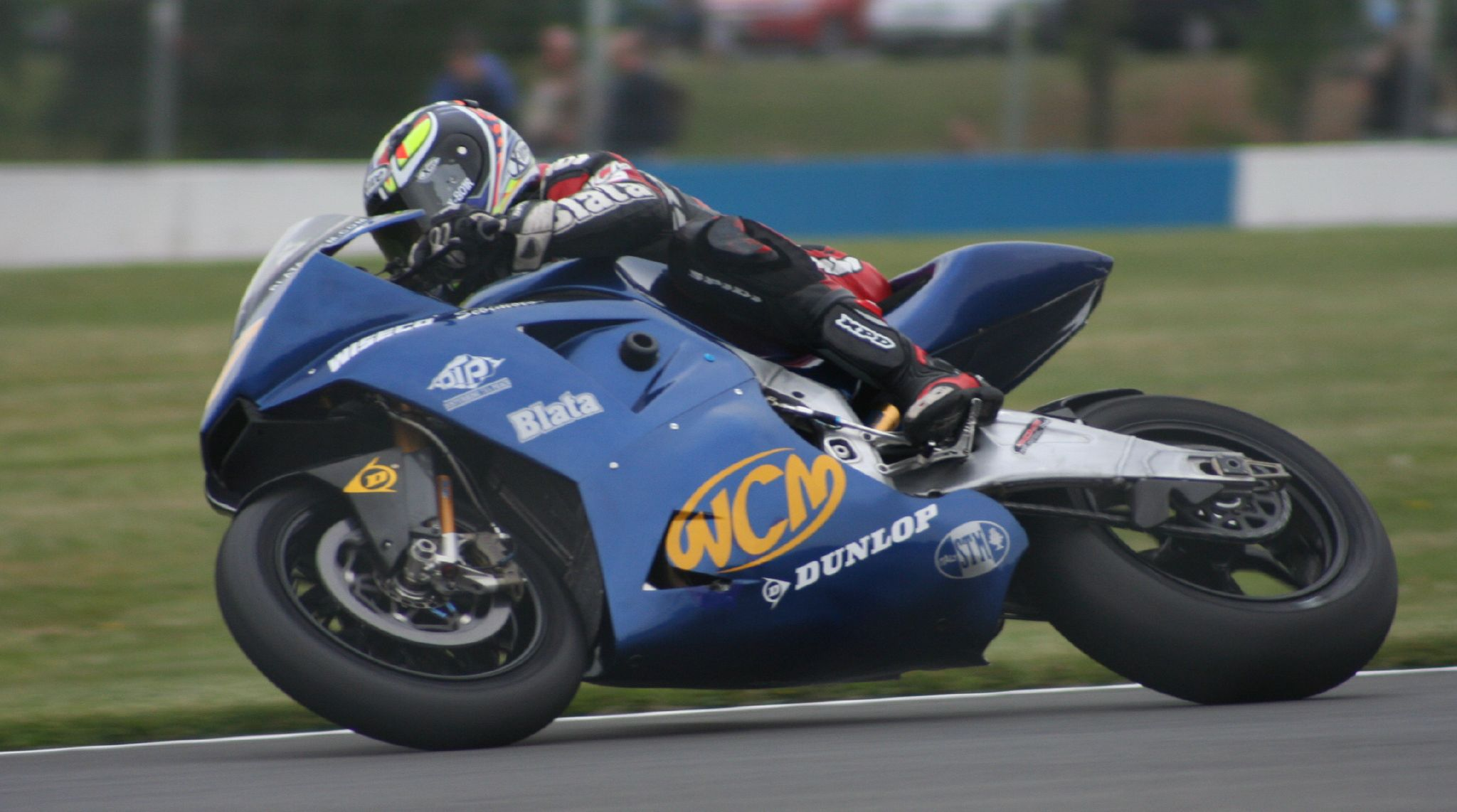
James Ellison at the 2005 British motorcycle Grand Prix

In 2005, Ellison scored seven points whilst riding an underpowered bike, but impressed with his attitude and ability.

For 2006, Ellison switched to the Tech 3 Yamaha team. At Philip Island, he made history as the first rider to switch bikes mid-race, onto a bike with wet weather tyres. He later finished 16th and out of the points-scoring positions. He said that he was "disappointed" with the balance of the Yamaha M1 bike that season, and that his bike lacked a chassis modification to cure chatter, which the three other Yamaha riders had been riding.

=== AMA Superbike Championship (2007) ===
Ellison's contract with Tech 3 Yamaha was not renewed for following season. He then made the move across the pond and raced in AMA Superbike in the United States for the Corona Honda team in 2007. He had a best finish of fifth at the wet Daytona circuit, in what was a difficult season in the AMA.

=== Return to British Superbike ===
Ellison returned to British Superbikes for 2008, with the Hydrex Bike Animal team He took his first ever BSB podium in race 2 of round 2 at Oulton Park. After finishing the season with a podium finish at Brands Hatch on 12 October 2008, Ellison announced that he would be leaving the Hydrex Bike Animal team, and three days later, it was announced that Ellison has signed a contract with GSE Racing to ride their Yamaha YZF-R1 for the 2009 season. He took his first career win in round 3 of the series at Donington Park.

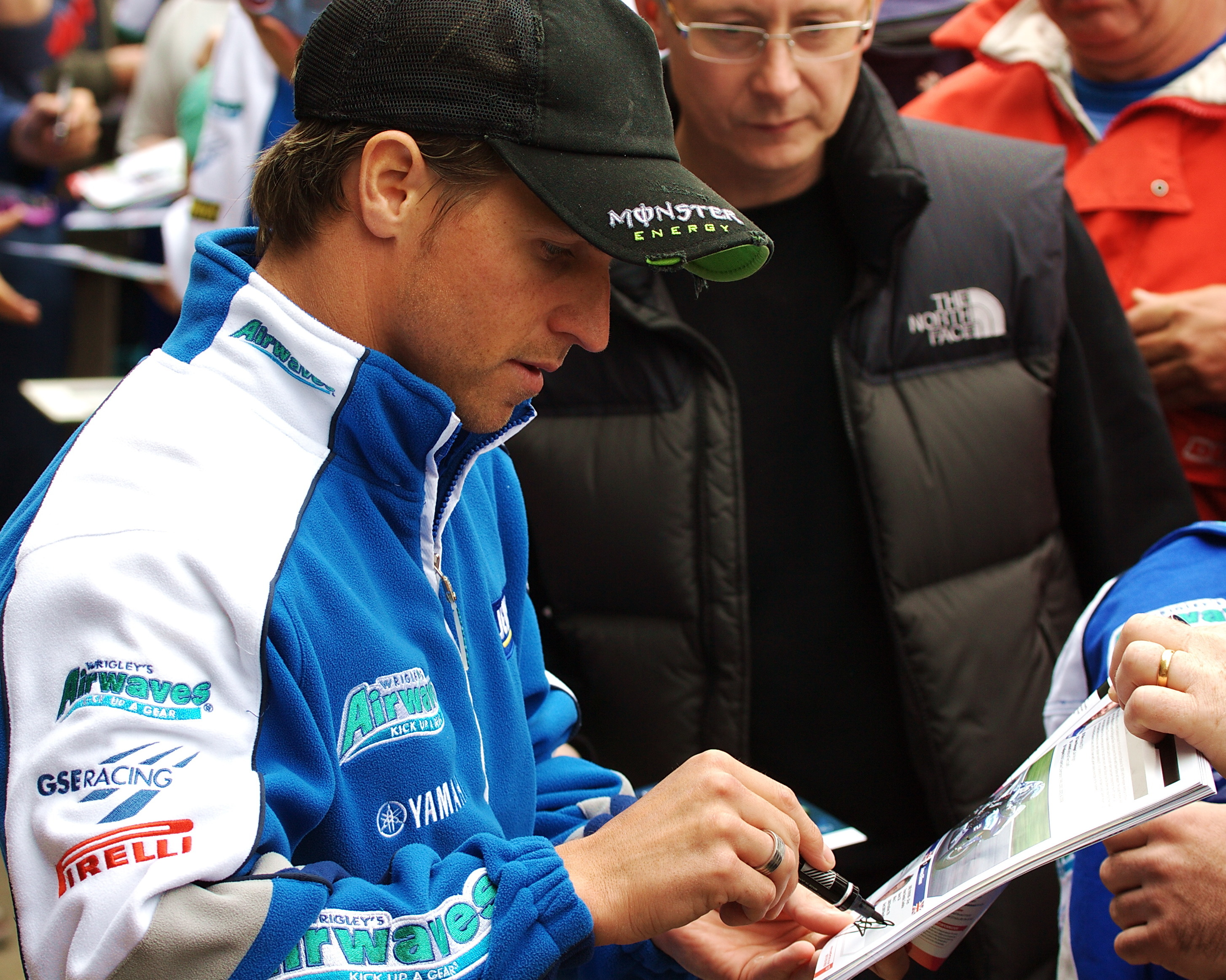
Ellison signing autographs during the 2009 BSB championship at Snetterton

At the end of 2009, the title sponsor of GSE Racing, Wrigleys UK, opted not renew their backing of the team. After failing to find an alternative backer, GSE Racing pulled out of the championship, leaving Ellison without a ride for the 2010 British Superbike Championship. On 7 February, Ellison confirmed that he had agreed a contract with the Swan Honda team to ride in the 2010 championship. Ellison's season was closely documented in the film I, Superbiker.

The 2010 season started promising when Ellison scored a win and a podium at the first two races at Brands Hatch, but he crashed and injured during the next round, missing the next three rounds. He won another race and finished the season in seventh place, missing the qualifying for the Showdown just for points.

In 2011, Ellison with a Honda, raced part-time the championship and finished the season in 16th place, scoring a podium.

In 2013, Ellison raced with a Yamaha and finished the season in a strong fourth place, scoring 589 points, 54 less than Champion Alex Lowes, and winning three races.

In 2014, Ellison joined Kawasaki and suffered an injury mid-season and he was forced to withdraw almost half of the season. He was anyway classified in 8th place and he scored some podiums also.

In 2015, Ellison finished in third place, scoring 614 points and winning three races with the Kawasaki, 89 points less than Series Champion Josh Brookes.

In 2016, Ellison finished the championship once again in third place, with 610 points, 59 less than champion Shane Byrne. He won the last two races at the season finale at Brands Hatch.

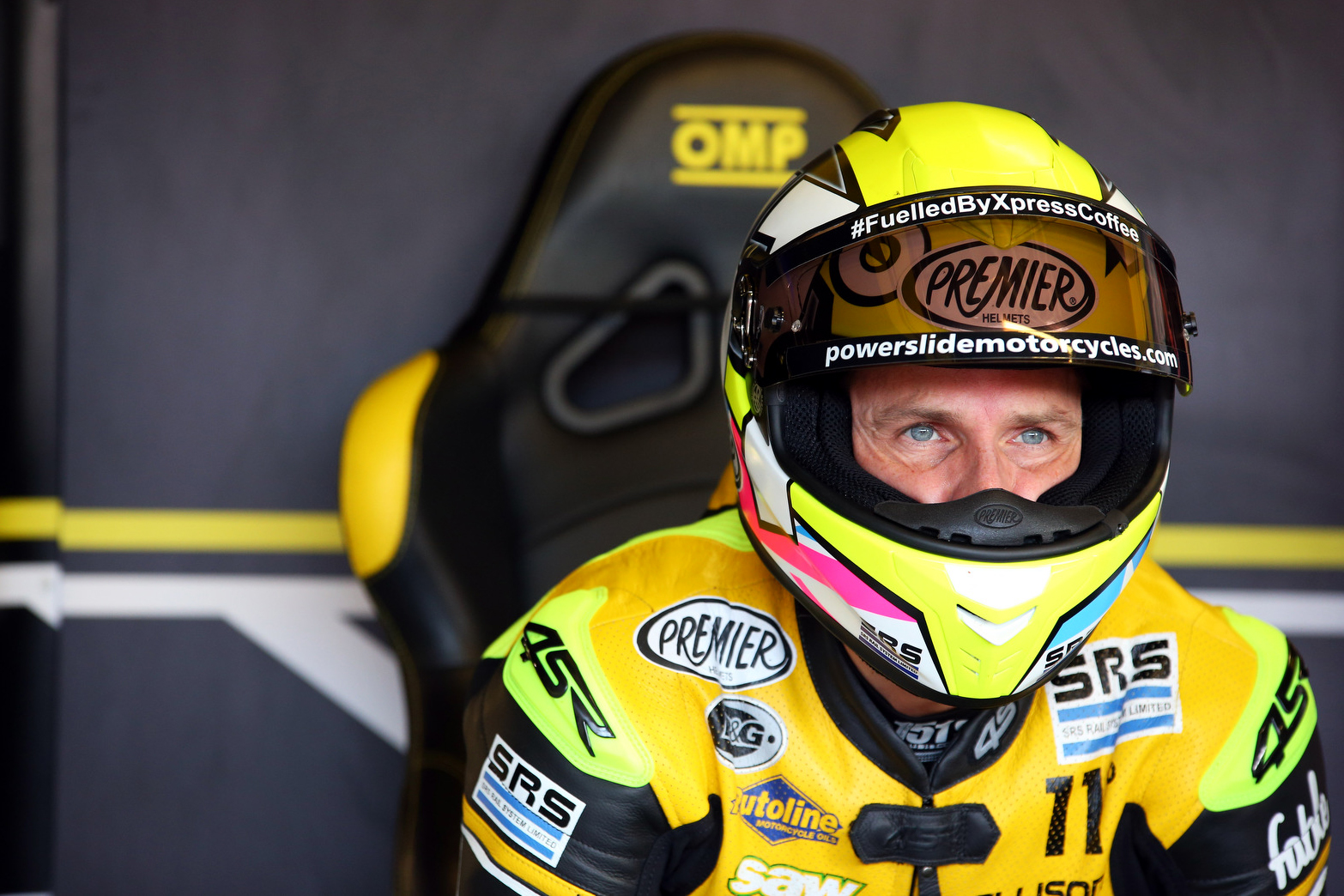
Ellison at Brands Hatch in 2018

In 2017, Ellison finished the British Superbike Championship in ninth place, scoring 139 points, winning a race.

== Managerial career ==
During 2018, Ellison rode with Anvil Hire Yamaha, intending to retire from competition at season-end, but signed with Smiths BMW Racing for 2019. After the Thruxton event in August it was announced they would part ways, after disappointing results with a total score of 23 points. He then joined another British Superbike team for the remainder of the 2019 season, starting from the September event at Oulton Park, on the ex-Danny Kent machine, previously an ex-Leon Camier 2016 MV Agusta F4. Kent had been sacked in August, with Gino Rea riding the same machine as a temporary replacement for one meeting at Cadwell Park.

In December 2021, Ellison was announced as team manager for Powerslide Catfoss Racing together with Hawk Racing in the 2022 British Superbike Championship.

== Career statistics ==
1996: 1st, 125 Clubman's Championship

1998: 1st, CB 500 Championship

2003: 1st, World Endurance Championship

2003: 4th, Suzuka 8 Hours (1st in class)

2003: Cumbria Sports Personality of the year

2004: 1st, British Superbike Privateer Championship

2012: 16th, MotoGP Championship (4th CRT)

=== All-time statistics ===
| Series | Years active | Races | Poles | Podiums | **Wins** | **2nd place** | **3rd place** | Fastest laps | Titles |
| British Superbike (BSB) | 2008–2011, 2013–2017 | 198 | 4 | 67 | 15 | 25 | 27 | 23 | 0 |
| World Superbike (SBK) | 2004, 2008, 2009 | 8 | 0 | 0 | 0 | 0 | 0 | 1 | 0 |
| MotoGP | 2004–2006, 2012 | 57 | 0 | 0 | 0 | 0 | 0 | 0 | 0 |
| World Supersport (SS) | 2011 | 12 | 0 | 2 | 0 | 1 | 1 | 2 | 0 |

=== Supersport World Championship ===
==== Races by year ====
(key) (Races in bold indicate pole position) (Races in italics indicate fastest lap)

| Year | Bike | 1 | 2 | 3 | 4 | 5 | 6 | 7 | 8 | 9 | 10 | 11 | 12 | Pos | Pts |
|---|---|---|---|---|---|---|---|---|---|---|---|---|---|---|---|
| 1999 | Honda | RSA | GBR | SPA | ITA | GER | SMR | USA; Ret | EUR | AUT | NED | GER | | NC | 0 |
| 2000 | Honda | AUS | JPN | GBR | ITA | GER | SMR | SPA | EUR; 23 | NED; 15 | GER; 11 | GBR | | 33rd | 6 |
| 2002 | Kawasaki | SPA; 15 | AUS; 15 | RSA; Ret | JPN; 13 | ITA; Ret | GBR; Ret | GER; Ret | SMR; 17 | GBR; 13 | GER; 9 | NED; 16 | ITA; 11 | 20th | 20 |
| 2011 | Honda | AUS; 6 | EUR; Ret | NED; 7 | ITA; 16 | SMR; 7 | SPA; Ret | CZE; 8 | GBR; 10 | GER; 2 | ITA; 6 | FRA; 5 | POR; 3 | 7th | 99 |

=== Superstock European Championship ===
==== Races by year ====
(key) (Races in bold indicate pole position) (Races in italics indicate fastest lap)

| Year | Bike | 1 | 2 | 3 | 4 | 5 | 6 | 7 | 8 | 9 | Pos | Pts |
|---|---|---|---|---|---|---|---|---|---|---|---|---|
| 2000 | Honda | DON; 3 | MNZ; 9 | HOC; 6 | SMR; Ret | VAL; 6 | BRA; 3 | OSC; 1 | NED; 1 | BRA2; 4 | 1st | 122 |
| 2001 | Suzuki | VAL; 1 | MNZ; 2 | DON; 1 | LAU; 1 | SMR; Ret | BRA; 3 | OSC; 1 | NED; 6 | IMO; 3 | 1st | 162 |
| 2003 | Suzuki | VAL | MNZ; 6 | OSC; 6 | SIL; 5 | SMR; 10 | BRA; 1 | NED; 2 | IMO; 6 | MAG; 2 | 3rd | 112 |

=== FIM World Endurance Championship ===
==== By team ====
| Year | Team | Bike | Rider | TC |
|---|---|---|---|---|
| 2004 | (United Kingdom) Suzuki GB - Phase One | Suzuki GSX-R1000 | (United Kingdom) James Ellison (United States) Jason Pridmore (United Kingdom) Andy Notman (United Kingdom) Dean Ellison (United States) Josh Hayes (France) Olivier Four (Sweden) Jimmy Lindstrom | **1st** |
| 2004 | Yamaha Austria Racing Team | Yamaha YZF-R1 | (Slovenia) Igor Jerman (Austria) Horst Saiger (Austria) Thomas Hinterreiter (United Kingdom) James Ellison (United Kingdom) Mike Edwards (United Kingdom) Gary Mason (Australia) Dean Thomas (France) Marc Garcia | 4th |

=== Superbike World Championship ===
==== Races by year ====
(key) (Races in bold indicate pole position) (Races in italics indicate fastest lap)

| Year | Bike | 1 | | 2 | | 3 | | 4 | | 5 | | 6 | | 7 | | 8 | | 9 | | 10 | | 11 | | 12 | | 13 | | 14 | | Pos | Pts |
| Year | Bike | R1 | R2 | R1 | R2 | R1 | R2 | R1 | R2 | R1 | R2 | R1 | R2 | R1 | R2 | R1 | R2 | R1 | R2 | R1 | R2 | R1 | R2 | R1 | R2 | R1 | R2 | R1 | R2 | Pos | Pts |
|---|---|---|---|---|---|---|---|---|---|---|---|---|---|---|---|---|---|---|---|---|---|---|---|---|---|---|---|---|---|---|---|
| 2004 | Yamaha | SPA | SPA | AUS | AUS | SMR | SMR | ITA | ITA | GER | GER | GBR; Ret | GBR; 7 | USA | USA | EUR; 6 | EUR; 5 | NED | NED | ITA | ITA | FRA | FRA | | | | | | | 19th | 30 |
| 2008 | Honda | QAT | QAT | AUS | AUS | SPA | SPA | NED | NED | ITA | ITA | USA | USA | GER | GER | SMR | SMR | CZE | CZE | GBR | GBR | EUR; 10 | EUR; 4 | ITA | ITA | FRA | FRA | POR | POR | 25th | 19 |
| 2009 | Yamaha | AUS | AUS | QAT | QAT | SPA | SPA | NED | NED | ITA | ITA | RSA | RSA | USA | USA | SMR | SMR | GBR; Ret | GBR; 8 | CZE | CZE | GER | GER | ITA | ITA | FRA | FRA | POR | POR | 31st | 8 |

=== Grand Prix motorcycle racing ===
==== Races by year ====
(key) (Races in bold indicate pole position, races in italics indicate fastest lap)

| Year | Class | Bike | 1 | 2 | 3 | 4 | 5 | 6 | 7 | 8 | 9 | 10 | 11 | 12 | 13 | 14 | 15 | 16 | 17 | 18 | Pos | Pts |
|---|---|---|---|---|---|---|---|---|---|---|---|---|---|---|---|---|---|---|---|---|---|---|
| 2004 | MotoGP | Harris WCM | RSA | ESP | FRA | ITA | CAT | NED | BRA | GER | GBR | CZE; Ret | POR; 16 | JPN | QAT; 13 | MAL; 18 | AUS; 22 | VAL; 19 | | | 26th | 3 |
| 2005 | MotoGP | Blata | SPA; 16 | POR; 15 | CHN; 13 | FRA; Ret | ITA; Ret | CAT; 18 | NED; 19 | USA; 16 | GBR; Ret | GER; Ret | CZE; 19 | JPN; DNS | MAL; Ret | QAT; 15 | AUS; 14 | TUR; 18 | VAL; Ret | | 23rd | 7 |
| 2006 | MotoGP | Yamaha | SPA; 16 | QAT; 13 | TUR; 18 | CHN; 16 | FRA; 14 | ITA; 16 | CAT; 9 | NED; Ret | GBR; 14 | GER; 13 | USA; 13 | CZE; 17 | MAL; 16 | AUS; 16 | JPN; 15 | POR; 13 | VAL; 14 | | 18th | 26 |
| 2012 | MotoGP | ART | QAT; 18 | SPA; Ret | POR; Ret | FRA; 11 | CAT; 16 | GBR; 14 | NED; 14 | GER; 15 | ITA; 14 | USA; Ret | INP; 15 | CZE; 15 | RSM; 13 | ARA; 14 | JPN; 14 | MAL; 9 | AUS; Ret | VAL; 9 | 16th | 35 |

=== British Superbike Championship ===
(key) (Races in bold indicate pole position; races in italics indicate fastest lap)

| Year | Class | Bike | 1 | | 2 | | 3 | | 4 | | 5 | | 6 | | 7 | | 8 | | 9 | | 10 | | 11 | | 12 | | 13 | | Pos | Pts |
| Year | Class | Bike | R1 | R2 | R1 | R2 | R1 | R2 | R1 | R2 | R1 | R2 | R1 | R2 | R1 | R2 | R1 | R2 | R1 | R2 | R1 | R2 | R1 | R2 | R1 | R2 | R1 | R2 | Pos | Pts |
|---|---|---|---|---|---|---|---|---|---|---|---|---|---|---|---|---|---|---|---|---|---|---|---|---|---|---|---|---|---|---|
| 2004 | BSB | Yamaha | SIL; 12 | SIL; 15 | BHI; 14 | BHI; 18 | SNE; 11 | SNE; 12 | OUL; 10 | OUL; 8 | MON; 13 | MON; Ret | THR; 8 | THR; 5 | BHGP; 15 | BHGP; 13 | KNO; 7 | KNO; 10 | MAL; 15 | MAL; 13 | CRO; 11 | CRO; 9 | CAD; 14 | CAD; 10 | OUL; 15 | OUL; 13 | DON; 11 | DON; 9 | 12th | 111 |

| Year | Make | 1 | | | 2 | | | 3 | | | 4 | | | 5 | | | 6 | | | 7 | | | 8 | | | 9 | | | 10 | | | 11 | | | 12 | | | Pos | Pts |
| Year | Make | R1 | R2 | R3 | R1 | R2 | R3 | R1 | R2 | R3 | R1 | R2 | R3 | R1 | R2 | R3 | R1 | R2 | R3 | R1 | R2 | R3 | R1 | R2 | R3 | R1 | R2 | R3 | R1 | R2 | R3 | R1 | R2 | R3 | R1 | R2 | R3 | Pos | Pts |
|---|---|---|---|---|---|---|---|---|---|---|---|---|---|---|---|---|---|---|---|---|---|---|---|---|---|---|---|---|---|---|---|---|---|---|---|---|---|---|---|
| 2008 | Honda | THR; 7 | THR; 7 | | OUL; 8 | OUL; 2 | | BHGP; 6 | BHGP; 8 | | DON; 4 | DON; 5 | | SNE; 7 | SNE; 10 | | MAL; 5 | MAL; 11 | | OUL; 2 | OUL; 5 | | KNO; 3 | KNO; 5 | | CAD | CAD | | CRO; 9 | CRO; 7 | | SIL; Ret | SIL; 6 | | BHI; 3 | BHI; 5 | | 7th | 230 |
| 2009 | Yamaha | BHI; 5 | BHI; 7 | | OUL; 5 | OUL; 4 | | DON; 2 | DON; 1 | | THR; 2 | THR; 2 | | SNE; 4 | SNE; 2 | | KNO; 5 | KNO; 3 | | MAL; 1 | MAL; 2 | | BHGP; 6 | BHGP; 5 | BHGP; 3 | CAD; 3 | CAD; 1 | | CRO; 2 | CRO; 4 | | SIL; 2 | SIL; 1 | | OUL; 4 | OUL; 3 | OUL; 12 | **2nd** | **413** |
| 2010 | Honda | BHI; 3 | BHI; 1 | | THR; DNS | THR; DNS | | OUL | OUL | | CAD | CAD | | MAL; 13 | MAL; 12 | | KNO; 24 | KNO; C | | SNE; 7 | SNE; 4 | SNE; Ret | BHGP; 7 | BHGP; 5 | BHGP; 5 | CAD; 6 | CAD; 6 | | CRO; Ret | CRO; 6 | | SIL; 4 | SIL; 1 | | OUL; 3 | OUL; 7 | OUL; 3 | 7th | 210 |
| 2011 | Honda | BHI | BHI | | OUL | OUL | | CRO | CRO | | THR | THR | | KNO | KNO | | SNE | SNE | | OUL; 11 | OUL; C | | BHGP; 24 | BHGP; Ret | BHGP; 13 | CAD; 13 | CAD; 11 | CAD; 10 | DON; 8 | DON; 7 | | SIL | SIL | | BHGP; 5 | BHGP; 3 | BHGP; 4 | 16th | 79 |
| 2013 | Yamaha | BHI; 16 | **BHI**; 1 | | THR; 6 | THR; 3 | | OUL; 2 | OUL; Ret | | KNO; 7 | KNO; Ret | | SNE; 4 | SNE; 9 | | BHGP; Ret | **BHGP**; 2 | | OUL; 1 | OUL; Ret | OUL; 4 | CAD; Ret | CAD; 3 | | DON; 3 | DON; 6 | | ASS; Ret | ASS; 1 | | SIL; 5 | SIL; 4 | | BHGP; Ret | BHGP; 3 | BHGP; 5 | 4th | 589 |
| 2014 | Kawasaki | BHI; 3 | **BHI**; 3 | | OUL; 3 | OUL; 3 | | SNE; 3 | SNE; 2 | | KNO; Ret | KNO; 8 | | BHGP; 3 | BHGP; DNS | | THR | THR | | OUL | OUL | OUL | CAD; DNS | CAD; DNS | | DON; 14 | DON; 11 | | ASS; 4 | ASS; 7 | | SIL; 11 | SIL; 3 | | **BHGP**; 7 | BHGP; 2 | BHGP; 2 | 8th | 223 |

| Year | Make | 1 | | 2 | | 3 | | | 4 | | 5 | | 6 | | | 7 | | 8 | | | 9 | | | 10 | | 11 | | 12 | | | Pos | Pts |
| Year | Make | R1 | R2 | R1 | R2 | R1 | R2 | R3 | R1 | R2 | R1 | R2 | R1 | R2 | R3 | R1 | R2 | R1 | R2 | R3 | R1 | R2 | R3 | R1 | R2 | R1 | R2 | R1 | R2 | R3 | Pos | Pts |
|---|---|---|---|---|---|---|---|---|---|---|---|---|---|---|---|---|---|---|---|---|---|---|---|---|---|---|---|---|---|---|---|---|
| 2015 | Kawasaki | DON; 1 | DON; 12 | **BHI**; 1 | **BHI**; 1 | OUL; 6 | OUL; 2 | | SNE; Ret | SNE; 7 | KNO; Ret | **KNO**; Ret | BHGP; 3 | BHGP; 4 | | THR; DNS | THR; DNS | CAD | CAD | | OUL; 2 | OUL; 5 | OUL; 5 | ASS; 2 | ASS; 2 | SIL; 5 | SIL; 17 | BHGP; 6 | BHGP; 5 | BHGP; 2 | **3rd** | **614** |
| 2016 | Kawasaki | SIL; 13 | SIL; 8 | OUL; 3 | OUL; 4 | BHI; 2 | BHI; Ret | | KNO; 7 | KNO; 2 | SNE; Ret | SNE; Ret | THR; 5 | THR; 7 | | BHGP; 10 | BHGP; 9 | CAD; 6 | CAD; 8 | | OUL; 2 | OUL; 2 | OUL; Ret | DON; 4 | DON; 7 | ASS; 3 | ASS; 7 | BHGP; Ret | BHGP; 1 | **BHGP**; 1 | 3rd | 610 |
| 2017 | Yamaha | DON; 5 | DON; 6 | **BHI**; Ret | **BHI**; Ret | OUL; 6 | OUL; Ret | | KNO; Ret | KNO; 2 | SNE; Ret | SNE; Ret | BHGP; 6 | BHGP; 2 | | THR; 19 | THR; 9 | CAD; 10 | CAD; 1 | | SIL; Ret | SIL; 2 | SIL'; Ret | OUL; 5 | OUL; 10 | **ASS**; 3 | ASS; 4 | BHGP; 5 | BHGP; 3 | **BHGP**; 3 | 8th | 228 |
| 2018 | Yamaha | DON; 3 | DON; Ret | BHI; 16 | BHI; 11 | OUL; 11 | OUL; 12 | | SNE; 8 | SNE; Ret | KNO; 13 | KNO; 9 | BHGP; Ret | BHGP; 9 | | THR; 12 | THR; 15 | CAD; 9 | CAD; Ret | | SIL; Ret | SIL; 13 | SIL; 11 | OUL; 9 | OUL; 10 | ASS; 10 | ASS; 8 | BHGP; 8 | BHGP; Ret | BHGP; Ret | 14th | 110 |

| Year | Bike | 1 | | 2 | | 3 | | | 4 | | 5 | | 6 | | 7 | | 8 | | 9 | | | 10 | | 11 | | 12 | | | Pos | Pts |
| Year | Bike | R1 | R2 | R1 | R2 | R1 | R2 | R3 | R1 | R2 | R1 | R2 | R1 | R2 | R1 | R2 | R1 | R2 | R1 | R2 | R3 | R1 | R2 | R1 | R2 | R1 | R2 | R3 | Pos | Pts |
|---|---|---|---|---|---|---|---|---|---|---|---|---|---|---|---|---|---|---|---|---|---|---|---|---|---|---|---|---|---|---|
| 2019 | BMW/MV Agusta/Suzuki | SIL; Ret | SIL; Ret | OUL; 23 | OUL; Ret | DON; 15 | DON; 16 | DON; 15 | BRH; 12 | BRH; 14 | KNO; 12 | KNO; 10 | SNE; Ret | SNE; 17 | THR; 16 | THR; 11 | CAD | CAD | OUL; 13 | OUL; Ret | OUL; DNS | ASS; 14 | ASS; Ret | DON; Ret | DON; 20 | BHGP; DNS | BHGP; 17 | BHGP; Ret | 21st | 28 |

=== MotoAmerica SuperBike Championship ===
| Year | Class | Team | 1 | 2 | | 3 | | 4 | | 5 | | 6 | | 7 | 8 | | 9 | | 10 | | 11 | Pos | Pts |
| Year | Class | Team | R1 | R1 | R2 | R1 | R2 | R1 | R2 | R1 | R2 | R1 | R2 | R1 | R1 | R2 | R1 | R2 | R1 | R2 | R1 | Pos | Pts |
|---|---|---|---|---|---|---|---|---|---|---|---|---|---|---|---|---|---|---|---|---|---|---|---|
| 2007 | SuperBike | Honda | DAY; 9 | BAR; 10 | BAR; 11 | FON; Ret | FON; 12 | INF; 9 | INF; 8 | RAM; Ret | RAM; 5 | MIL; 10 | MIL; 11 | LAG; 10 | OHI; 10 | OHI; 11 | VIR; 10 | VIR; Ret | RAT; Ret | RAT; 8 | LAG; 8 | 11th | 323 |
