= Maria Costello =

British motorcycle racer

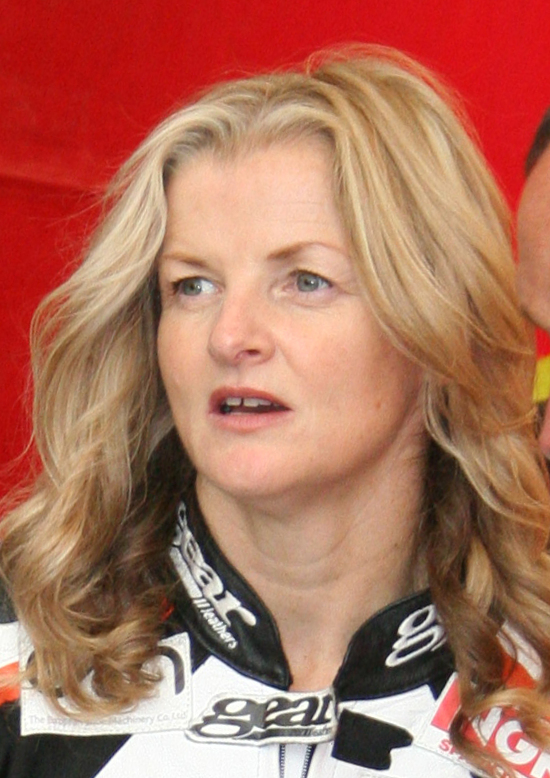
- Costello in 2016
- Nationality: English
- Born: 9 June 1973 (age 53); Northampton, England
- Website: Maria Costello Motorsport
Motorcycle racing career statistics
Isle of Man TT career
TTs contested	6 (2002–2004, 2010–2013 and 2017)
TT wins	0
TT podiums	0

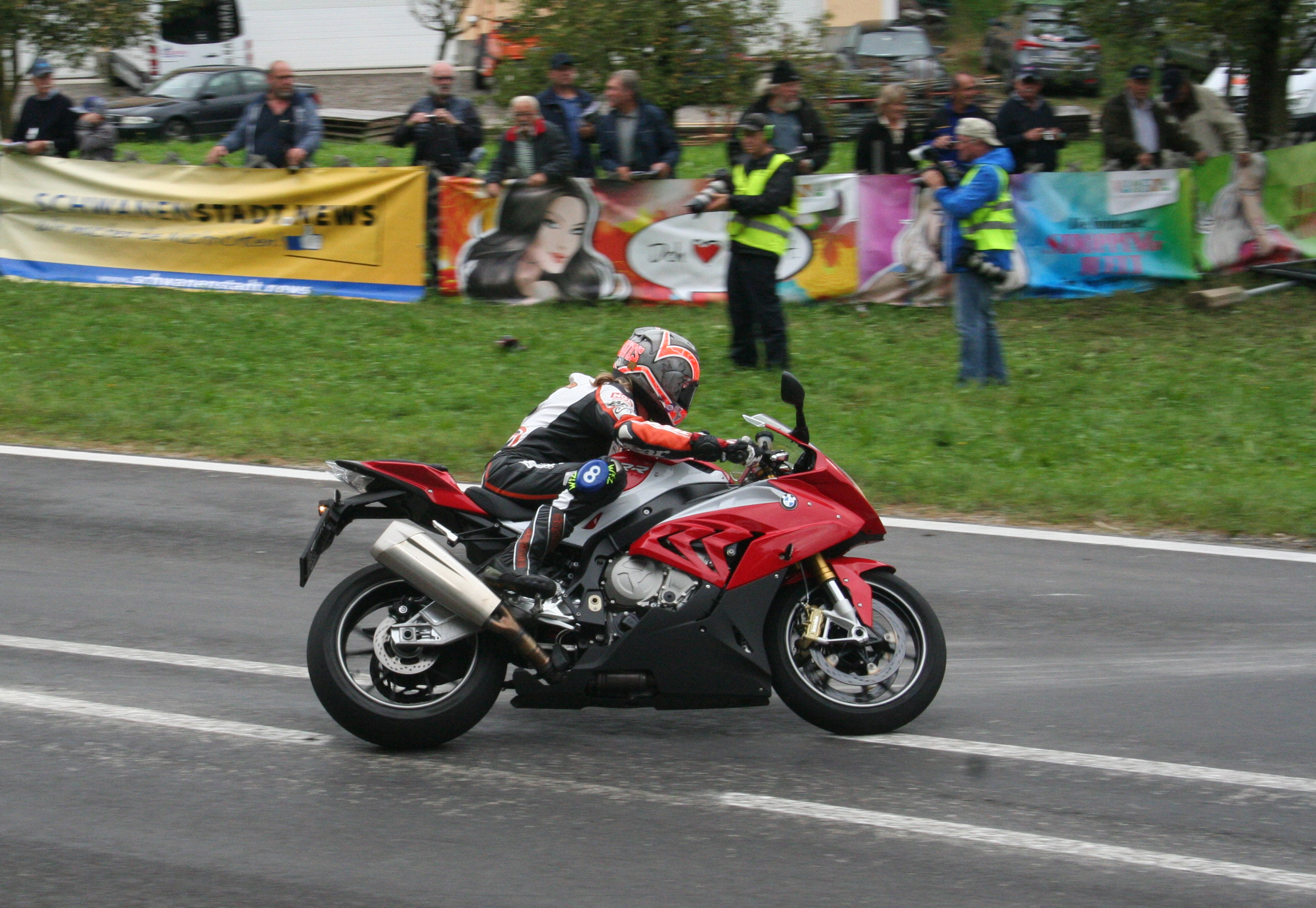
Costello riding a BMW S1000RR at the 2016 Oldtimer Grand Prix in Schwanenstadt, Austria

Maria Costello MBE (born 9 June 1973, Northampton, England) from Spratton in Northamptonshire, is a British motorcycle racer who held the Guinness World Record for being the fastest woman to lap the Isle of Man TT course at an average speed of 114.73 mph until Jenny Tinmouth took the record at the 2009 TT.

Costello suffered life-changing injuries in a May 2026 crash when her sidecar outfit hit a hare at Brandish Corner during race practice on the Isle of Man's Snaefell Mountain Course, and, as of October 2026, had started specialist rehabilitation at Stoke Mandeville Hospital.

== Racing background ==
Costello was the first woman (solo racer) in the history of the Isle of Man motorcycle races to stand on the podium when she took third place in the Ultra Lightweight category of the 2005 Manx Grand Prix. Riding a Honda RVF400, Costello became the first woman rider of a solo machine to take a podium finish in either a TT race or Manx GP.

In her first appearance at the North West 200 Irish road race, Costello came third in the 400 cc class on a Honda RVF400, placing her seventh overall, in the joint 125 cc/400 cc race. She also raced in both 600 cc classes on her Honda CBR600RR.

In 2004 at the Isle of Man TT races, Costello achieved a Guinness World Record by becoming the fastest woman to lap the Snaefell mountain course at an average speed of 114.73 mph. She also finished eighth in the Senior race of the Manx Grand Prix (collecting a Silver replica award) in a field of more than 80 competitors.

Costello has won a total of eight Manx Grand Prix Silver Replicas and one TT Bronze Replica. These are trophies awarded only to those who finish within a percentage of the winner's time.

In 2022, Costello was engaged as a mentor to Faye Ho's female squad, part of her FHO Racing team established to support up and coming female racers. Initially supporting three riders, the squad was extended to four in 2022, and five in 2023.

For 2023, Costello was expected to race in the Sidecar TT under Faye Ho's banner, but was sidelined with injury after a practice accident riding a Supertwin solo machine. Costello had previously raced in the sidecar event at the 2019 TT races, finishing in 21st for leg 1, and in 17th for leg 2, making history as the first female competitor to compete in both the Sidecar and a solo race, the Lightweight TT, on the same day.

On 26 May 2026 at the TT, Costello and her sidecar passenger Shaun Parker crashed in practice just before Brandish after colliding with a hare. Both were badly hurt and airlifted to hospital; Costello's condition was "serious but stable".

The following day, outright sidecar lap record holders Ryan and Callum Crowe were injured when their sidecar flipped at Crosby. The TT race authorities then cancelled all sidecar racing for 2026 "as a precautionary measure". On 1 June 2026, it was announced that Costello was "currently paralysed from T5/T6 down" following the crash.

Costello made her first public appearance in August 2026 at Thruxton during a British Superbike Championship race meeting.

== Journalism ==
Costello has been contributing to the motorcycle press as a freelance journalist since her career in motorcycle racing began in 1995. Initially it was her race press releases that were published in the local newspapers but her ability on the racetrack led to an invitation to join Motorcycle News and Performance Bikes on road tests. She is now a regular contributor to the Used Bike Guide in addition to publications such as Irish Racer Magazine and Motorcycle Racer.

== Film/TV career ==
Costello has appeared in several television programmes including an Anglia TV documentary on her return to the TT races in 2002, and she was one of a few included on TT Heroes, which followed competitors during the 2003 TT. Recently, Costello was a presenter on the motorcycle show Fran's Angels. She has also been a panellist on Top Ten Bikes, and has worked as a stunt double. She doubled for Tamzin Outhwaite on a mountain bike in an ITV drama Walk Away and I Stumble. Costello was the rider-double for Oscar-winning actress Reese Witherspoon and worked alongside the lead role played by Christina Ricci.

The Discovery Channel's Big Big Bikes program featured Costello racing a Honda Fireblade motorcycle against a Porsche 911 GT3 RS. This programme, in the UK alone, was seen by a million viewers; the global release in 2006 reached audience figures of between ten and twenty million.

Costello appeared as a contestant on Dave's television programme Driving Wars, in a team of fellow bikers called biker babes.

== Charity and sports promotion work ==
- Costello is an ambassador for the Institute of Advanced Motorists charity, with whom she has led women-only IAM RoadSmart skills days.
- Costello is a patron of Riders for Health and a supporter of MENCAP.
- As a "Sporting Champion" she visits schools and communities to encourage young people to take part in sport. In this capacity she has helped promote various sporting events, particularly in the East Midlands as part of backing the 2012 Olympics bid. She was one of the athletes invited to promote the 2005 Tour of Britain cycle race and gave a speech during the launch of the East Midlands route at Loughborough University.
- She is also a role model for the Auto Cycle Union, the governing body for two-wheeled motorsport. She is also a patron for the Women's Sport Foundation an organisation trying to bring equality to women's sport. Costello attended the BBC Sport Summit at BBC TV Centre in London, a day aimed at generating debate about the future of sport in the UK.

In 2012, Costello also worked as an occasional guest instructor for The Bike Experience, a charity organisation dedicated to helping motorcycle riders who have suffered spinal damage to ride again.

== Awards ==
- Costello won the BBC Northampton Sports Personality of the Year 2005
- She was nominated for the East Midlands Sports Personality of the Year Award 2005
- She has also won the Manx Motor Cycle Club – Lesley Ann Trophy. Awarded for the best performance by a female racer at the Manx GP on three occasions, 2002, 2004 and 2005. She has also received the EMRA – Outstanding Achievement Award in 2002 and 2004, and the Best Lady Award in 1995.
- Costello was appointed Member of the Order of the British Empire (MBE) in the 2009 Birthday Honours.

== Career statistics ==
=== Superstock European Championship ===
==== Races by year ====
(key) (Races in bold indicate pole position) (Races in italics indicate fastest lap)

Year	Bike	1	2	3	4	5	6	7	8	9	Pos	Pts
2001	Yamaha/Honda	VAL	MNZ	DON	LAU	SMR	BRA	OSC; DNQ	NED	IMO; DNQ	NC	0
