= 2000 Superstock European Championship =

2000 FIM Superstock 1000 Cup
Previous:	1999	Next:	2001
Support series: Superbike World Championship; Supersport World Championship

The 2000 Superstock European Championship was the second season of the FIM Superstock championship. The season began on 14 May at Donington Park, and finished on 15 October at Brands Hatch.

James Ellison won the title after beating closest rival Markus Wegscheider.

== Race calendar and results ==
Round	Date	Round	Circuit	Pole position	Fastest lap	Race winner	Winning team	Winning constructor
1	14 May	(United Kingdom) Great Britain	Donington Park	(Australia) Chris Vermeulen	(Australia) Chris Vermeulen	(Australia) Chris Vermeulen	Sanyo First National	Honda
2	21 May	Italy	Autodromo Nazionale Monza	(Italy) Fabio Capriotti	(United Kingdom) Chris Burns	(Italy) Dario Tosolini	TDC Desenzano Corse	Suzuki
3	4 June	Germany	Hockenheimring	(United Kingdom) Chris Burns	(Germany) Katja Poensgen	(United Kingdom) Chris Burns	Redwood Racing	Yamaha
4	18 June	San Marino	Autodromo Di Santa Monica	(Italy) Fabio Capriotti	(Germany) Katja Poensgen	(Italy) Fabio Capriotti	Winner Team Yamaha	Yamaha
5	25 June	Spain	Circuit Ricardo Tormo	(Spain) Daniel Oliver	(Italy) Dario Tosolini	(Spain) Daniel Oliver	Martin Racing	Aprilia
6	6 August	(European Union) Europe	Brands Hatch	(United Kingdom) Jamie Morley	(United Kingdom) Jamie Morley	(United Kingdom) Jamie Morley	Beckley s Suzuki C.	Suzuki
7	3 September	Netherlands	TT Circuit Assen	(Netherlands) Barry Veneman	(United Kingdom) James Ellison	(United Kingdom) James Ellison	Ten Kate Young Guns	Honda
8	10 September	Germany	Motorsport Arena Oschersleben	(United Kingdom) James Ellison	(Germany) Benny Jerzenbeck	(United Kingdom) James Ellison	Ten Kate Young Guns	Honda
9	15 October	(United Kingdom) Great Britain	Brands Hatch	(United Kingdom) Gary Mason	(United Kingdom) Gary Mason	(United Kingdom) Gary Mason	Nick Murgan Racing	Kawasaki

== Entry list ==
Team	Constructor	Motorcycle	No.	Rider	Rounds
Aprilia Desmo Racing	Aprilia	Aprilia RSV R	38	(Italy) Andrea Iommi	9
Aprilia Desmo Racing	Aprilia	Aprilia RSV R	44	(Spain) Francisco Riquelme	1–5
Aprilia Desmo Racing	Aprilia	Aprilia RSV R	60	(United Kingdom) Gary Mason	6–7
Aprilia Racing UK	Aprilia	Aprilia RSV R	75	(United Kingdom) Ray McCullock	9
FBC Racing	Aprilia	Aprilia RSV R	16	(Italy) Simone Suzzi	All
Martin Racing	Aprilia	Aprilia RSV R	2	(Spain) Daniel Oliver	All
Nutt Aprilia UK	Aprilia	Aprilia RSV R	88	(United Kingdom) Marty Nutt	1, 3–4, 6–9
Organise Racing Team	Aprilia	Aprilia RSV R	7	(Italy) Fabrizio Pellizzon	1–2, 6–8
Racing T. Gabrielli	Aprilia	Aprilia RSV R	31	(Italy) Gianluigi Vallisari	1–5, 7–8
Flanders Motor R.	Ducati	Ducati 996S	62	(Netherlands) John Bakker	7
Fratelli Team	Honda	Honda CBR900RR	17	(France) Frederic Jond	All
Ghelfi	Honda	Honda CBR900RR	20	(Italy) Roberto Ciroldi	1–2, 4–9
Ghelfi	Honda	Honda CBR900RR	39	(Italy) Massimo Bisconti	1–2, 4–9
Rumi	Honda	Honda CBR900RR	14	(Italy) Raffaello Fabbroni	All
Rumi	Honda	Honda CBR900RR	22	(United Kingdom) Steve Brogan	1, 3–4, 6–8
Rumi	Honda	Honda CBR900RR	53	(Italy) Andrea Manici	2
Rumi	Honda	Honda CBR900RR	53	(Italy) Andrea Manici	4
Rumi	Honda	Honda CBR900RR	76	(United Kingdom) Mark Heckles	9
Sanyo First National	Honda	Honda CBR900RR	48	(Australia) Chris Vermeulen	1
Speedline NRG	Honda	Honda CBR900RR	5	(United Kingdom) Paul Notman	All
Ten Kate Young Guns	Honda	Honda CBR900RR	8	(United Kingdom) James Ellison	All
Ten Kate Young Guns	Honda	Honda CBR900RR	73	(United Kingdom) Dean Ellison	9
TRS Team Rudy Servol	Honda	Honda CBR900RR	27	(France) Rudy Servol	All
White Endurance Team	Honda	Honda CBR900RR	69	(Switzerland) Yann Gyger	All
Gataka Moto	Kawasaki	Kawasaki ZX-9R	51	(United Kingdom) Kelvin Reilly	9
Green Kawasaki	Kawasaki	Kawasaki ZX-9R	6	(Germany) Dominique Duchene	1–5
Green Speed	Kawasaki	Kawasaki ZX-9R	49	(Germany) Benjamin Nabert	All
Hawk Racing	Kawasaki	Kawasaki ZX-9R	74	(United Kingdom) Mark Burr	9
Kawasaki Team Rosner	Kawasaki	Kawasaki ZX-9R	50	(Austria) Martin Bauer	2, 5–8
MotoPort Druten Kawasaki	Kawasaki	Kawasaki ZX-9R	63	(Netherlands) Paul Moijman	7
MRC Competicion	Kawasaki	Kawasaki ZX-9R	58	(Spain) Javier Valera	5
MRC Competicion	Kawasaki	Kawasaki ZX-9R	59	(Spain) Rubén Marcos	
Nick Murgan Racing	Kawasaki	Kawasaki ZX-9R	60	(United Kingdom) Gary Mason	9
Beckley s Suzuki C.	Suzuki	Suzuki GSX-R750	47	(United Kingdom) Jamie Morley	6, 9
Fratelli Team	Suzuki	Suzuki GSX-R750	9	(France) Stephane Jond	1–7
HP Racing	Suzuki	Suzuki GSX-R750	67	(Italy) Andrea Giachino	7–8
Implas Motorsport	Suzuki	Suzuki GSX-R750	43	(United Kingdom) Ben Askew	1, 6
Implas Motorsport	Suzuki	Suzuki GSX-R750	47	(United Kingdom) Jamie Morley	1
Pedercini	Suzuki	Suzuki GSX-R750	68	(Italy) Enrico Pasini	8
Star Moto	Suzuki	Suzuki GSX-R750	77	(France) Olivier Four	All
Steinhausen Racing	Suzuki	Suzuki GSX-R750	42	(Germany) Benny Jerzenbeck	All
Suzuki Alstare	Suzuki	Suzuki GSX-R750	11	(Germany) Katja Poensgen	All
Suzuki France	Suzuki	Suzuki GSX-R750	93	(France) Ludovic Brian	9
Suzuki Stefan Schmidt	Suzuki	Suzuki GSX-R750	54	(Italy) Markus Wegscheider	1–8
TDC Desenzano Corse	Suzuki	Suzuki GSX-R750	3	(Italy) Dario Tosolini	All
TDC Desenzano Corse	Suzuki	Suzuki GSX-R750	28	(Italy) Giacomo Romanelli	All
BKM Racing Team	Yamaha	Yamaha YZF-R1	34	(Belgium) Didier Van Keymeulen	All
Carlberg Racing Sweden	Yamaha	Yamaha YZF-R1	18	(Sweden) Niklas Carlberg	All
Dee Cee Jeans R.T.	Yamaha	Yamaha YZF-R1	37	(Netherlands) Barry Veneman	All
Delling	Yamaha	Yamaha YZF-R1	66	(Germany) Daniel Delling	8
Europe Team	Yamaha	Yamaha YZF-R1	57	(Italy) Stefano Cappellari	4
GiMotor Sport Light; GiMotorsport	Yamaha	Yamaha YZF-R1	19	(Italy) Alessandro Scorta	1–4
GiMotor Sport Light; GiMotorsport	Yamaha	Yamaha YZF-R1	91	(Italy) Claudio Cipriani	5
GiMotor Sport Light; GiMotorsport	Yamaha	Yamaha YZF-R1	91	(Italy) Gianluca Vizziello	6–9
Keller Corsa Team	Yamaha	Yamaha YZF-R1	23	(Belgium) Michael Weynand	All
KR Racing	Yamaha	Yamaha YZF-R1	51	(United Kingdom) Kelvin Reilly	1–6
KS Racing	Yamaha	Yamaha YZF-R1	21	(Belgium) Koen Vleugels	All
Racernet	Yamaha	Yamaha YZF-R1	61	(United Kingdom) Tristan Palmer	6
Redwood Racing	Yamaha	Yamaha YZF-R1	45	(United Kingdom) Chris Burns	1–4, 6–9
Right Track Tech 2000	Yamaha	Yamaha YZF-R1	41	(United Kingdom) Andy Notman	7–9
Valvoline Racing	Yamaha	Yamaha YZF-R1	56	(Italy) Omero Mercuri	3
Winner Team Yamaha	Yamaha	Yamaha YZF-R1	52	(Italy) Fabio Capriotti	2, 4
Yamaha Belgium	Yamaha	Yamaha YZF-R1	72	(Belgium) Steven Casaer	All

Key
Regular rider
Wildcard rider
Replacement rider

== Championship' standings ==
=== Riders' standings ===
Pos	Rider	Bike	DON (United Kingdom)	MNZ (Italy)	HOC (Germany)	MIS (San Marino)	VAL (Spain)	BRA (Europe)	OSC (Germany)	ASS (Netherlands)	BRA2 (United Kingdom)	Pts
1	(United Kingdom) James Ellison	Honda	3	9	6	Ret	6	3	1^{F}	1^{P}	4	122
2	(Italy) Markus Wegscheider	Suzuki	Ret	2	2	3	9	11	3	7		93
3	(United Kingdom) Chris Burns	Yamaha	2	3^{F}	1^{P}	Ret		2	17	12	18	85
4	(France) Olivier Four	Suzuki	6	6	7	4	4	4	5	Ret	10	85
5	(Italy) Dario Tosolini	Suzuki	17	1	4	Ret	2^{F}	13	14	8	9	78
6	(Germany) Katja Poensgen	Suzuki	Ret	10	5^{F}	2^{F}	Ret	7	4	6	11	74
7	(Spain) Daniel Oliver	Aprilia	10	5	18	5	1^{P}	Ret	11	4	Ret	71
8	(Belgium) Steven Casaer	Yamaha	13	8	11	Ret	8	21	10	2	7	59
9	(Netherlands) Barry Veneman	Yamaha	4	DSQ	Ret	7	5	9	Ret^{P}	9	5	58
10	(United Kingdom) Jamie Morley	Suzuki	5					1^{PF}			3	52
11	(France) Frederic Jond	Honda	Ret	15	10	9	13	12	6	11	6	46
12	(Germany) Benny Jerzenbeck	Suzuki	15	16	3	Ret	11	17	Ret	3^{F}	14	40
13	(United Kingdom) Gary Mason	Aprilia						6	Ret			35
13	(United Kingdom) Gary Mason	Kawasaki									1^{PF}	35
14	(United Kingdom) Steve Brogan	Honda	Ret		8	15		Ret	2	10		35
15	(France) Stephane Jond	Suzuki	12	11	16	6	10	8	Ret			33
16	(Austria) Martin Bauer	Kawasaki		7			7	5	20	13		32
17	(Italy) Giacomo Romanelli	Suzuki	21	17	13	Ret	3	15	9	Ret	13	30
18	(Italy) Fabio Capriotti	Yamaha		Ret^{P}		1^{P}						25
19	(Australia) Chris Vermeulen	Honda	1^{PF}					WD				25
20	(Italy) Fabrizio Pellizzon	Aprilia	9	4				DNS	12	20		24
21	(Italy) Raffaello Fabbroni	Honda	19	14	9	8	15	10	26	24	27	24
22	(United Kingdom) Mark Heckles	Honda									2	20
23	(Belgium) Koen Vleugels	Yamaha	16	Ret	12	10	14	16	8	16	23	20
24	(Italy) Gianluca Vizziello	Yamaha						14	19	5	24	13
25	(Spain) Francisco Riquelme	Aprilia	8	Ret	20	11	23					13
26	(United Kingdom) Andy Notman	Yamaha							7	Ret	DNS	9
27	(United Kingdom) Ben Askew	Suzuki	7					DNS				9
28	(United Kingdom) Mark Burr	Kawasaki									8	8
29	(Belgium) Didier Van Keymeulen	Yamaha	18	19	27	12	12	20	Ret	Ret	20	8
30	(Belgium) Michael Weynand	Yamaha	Ret	12	Ret	14	Ret	27	Ret	25	19	6
31	(United Kingdom) Paul Notman	Honda	11	20	Ret	Ret	17	22	24	17	31	5
32	(United Kingdom) Dean Ellison	Honda									12	4
33	(United Kingdom) Kelvin Reilly	Yamaha	Ret	13	15	Ret	Ret	23				4
33	(United Kingdom) Kelvin Reilly	Kawasaki									21	4
34	(Italy) Alessandro Scorta	Yamaha	14	Ret	14	16						4
35	(Netherlands) Paul Moijman	Kawasaki							13			3
36	(Italy) Simone Suzzi	Aprilia	23	24	26	13	21	24	25	23	30	3
37	(Switzerland) Yann Gyger	Honda	26	Ret	22	24	22	26	27	14	Ret	2
38	(Germany) Benjamin Nabert	Kawasaki	Ret	Ret	17	22	Ret	28	16	21	15	1
39	(France) Rudy Servol	Honda	20	25	21	20	16	25	28	15	26	1
40	(Italy) Andrea Giachino	Suzuki							15	18		1
	(United Kingdom) Ray McCullock	Aprilia									16	0
	(France) Ludovic Brian	Suzuki									17	0
	(Italy) Massimo Bisconti	Honda	22	23	WD	17	20	Ret	22	Ret	25	0
	(United Kingdom) Marty Nutt	Aprilia	24		25	18		18	18	Ret	22	0
	(Italy) Gianluigi Vallisari	Aprilia	28	22	24	Ret	18		21	27		0
	(Italy) Andrea Manici	Honda		18		Ret						0
	(Italy) Stefano Cappellari	Yamaha				19						0
	(Italy) Claudio Cipriani	Yamaha					19					0
	(United Kingdom) Tristan Palmer	Yamaha						19				0
	(Germany) Daniel Delling	Yamaha								19		0
	(Germany) Dominique Duchene	Kawasaki	25	21	19	21	Ret					0
	(Italy) Enrico Pasini	Suzuki								22		0
	(Italy) Omero Mercuri	Yamaha			23							0
	(Sweden) Niklas Carlberg	Yamaha	Ret	26	Ret	23	25	29	23	26	29	0
	(Italy) Roberto Ciroldi	Honda	27	Ret	WD	Ret	24	Ret	Ret	28	28	0
	(Spain) Javier Valera	Kawasaki					26					0
	(Netherlands) John Bakker	Ducati							Ret			0
	(Italy) Andrea Iommi	Aprilia									Ret	0
	(Spain) Rubén Marcos	Kawasaki					WD					
Pos	Rider	Bike	VAL (Spain)	MNZ (Italy)	DON (United Kingdom)	LAU (Germany)	MIS (San Marino)	BRA (Europe)	OSC (Germany)	ASS (Netherlands)	IMO (Italy)	Pts

Colour	Result
Gold	Winner
Silver	Second place
Bronze	Third place
Green	Points classification
Blue	Non-points classification
Blue	Non-classified finish (NC)
Purple	Retired, not classified (Ret)
Red	Did not qualify (DNQ)
Red	Did not pre-qualify (DNPQ)
Black	Disqualified (DSQ)
White	Did not start (DNS)
White	Withdrew (WD)
White	Race cancelled (C)
Blank	Did not practice (DNP)
Blank	Did not arrive (DNA)
Blank	Excluded (EX)

P – Pole position
F – Fastest lap
Source :
