= European Superstock 1000 Championship =

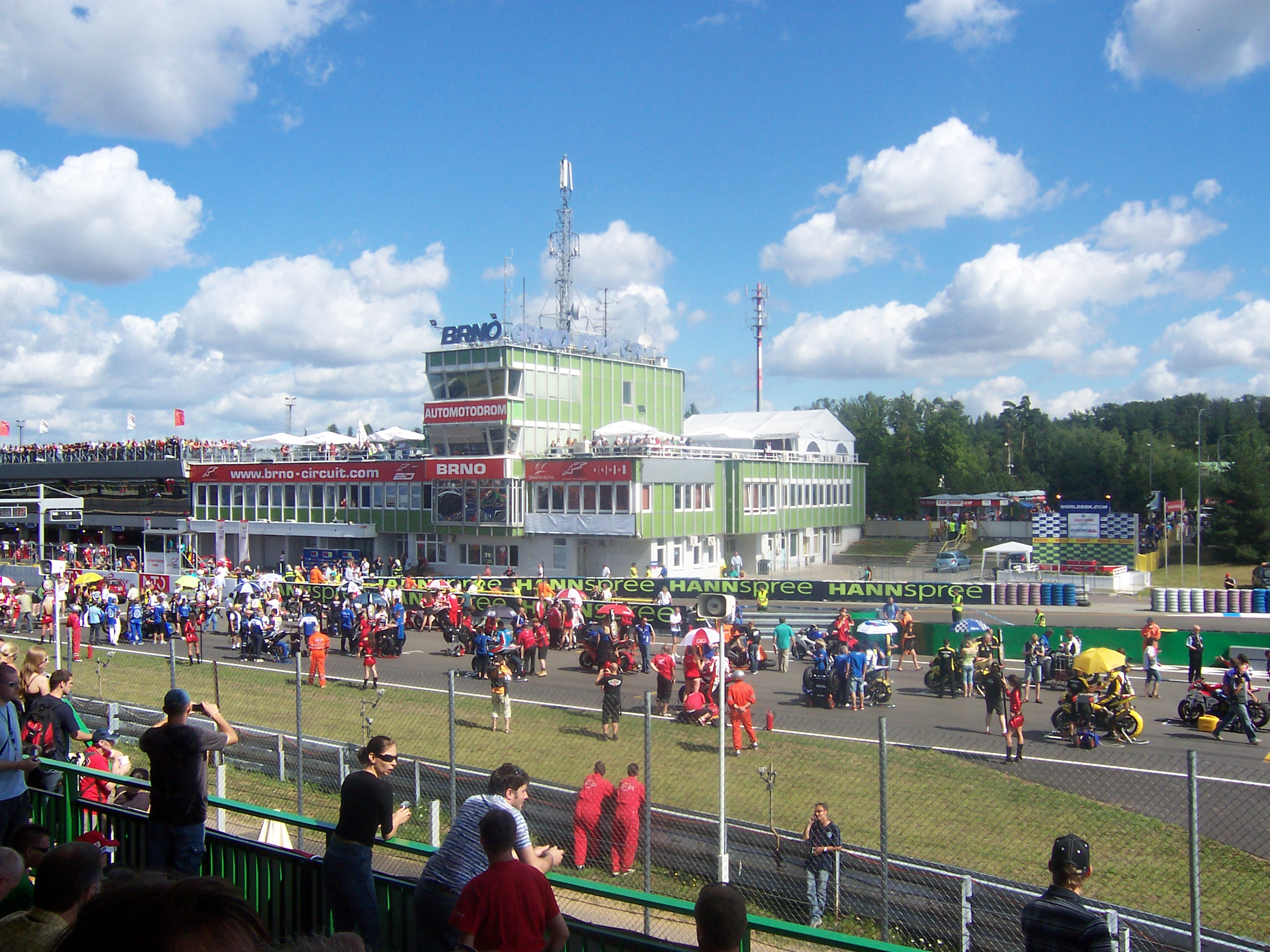
- The start of a Superstock 1000 race in 2008
- Sport: Motorcycle sport
- Founded: 1999
- Folded: 2018
- Last champions: Markus Reiterberger (rider); BMW (manufacturer)

The European Superstock 1000 Championship, formerly FIM Superstock 1000 Cup or Superstock 1000 FIM Cup, was a supporting class to the Superbike World Championship.

== Overview ==
The series was introduced in 1999 as a European championship and in October 2004 became the Superstock 1000 FIM Cup. It was classified as a FIM Prize. For 2017, the FIM CEV European Superbike Championship was discontinued and the FIM Cup was renamed European Superstock 1000 Championship, with its status changed back to European championship. The series was closed at the end of the 2018 season.

The championship was organized and promoted as its parent series by FGSport (renamed Infront Motor Sports in 2008) until 2012, and by Dorna since 2013 season to its closure.

== Regulations ==
=== Technical regulations ===
Much the same as the Superbike World Championship but all the bikes were much closer stock to spec and there was an age restriction on riders. FIM Superstock 1000 motorcycles were allowed modifications more aimed at safety and crash survivability/repairability than outright performance such as fiberglass silhouette bodywork with fluid retention capabilities and improved hand and foot controls. FIM Superstock 1000 motorcycles were allowed performance modifications such as brake pads and discs, chaindrive systems, exhaust systems, fork internals and rear shock absorbers.

=== Sporting regulations ===
At its inception, the series was restricted to riders aged from 16 to 24; the upper limit was raised to 26 in 2011, and to 28 in 2015.

The points system was the same for the riders' championship and the manufacturers' championship, but only the highest-finishing motorcycle by a particular manufacturer was awarded the points for the latter championship.

Points scoring system
Position	1	2	3	4	5	6	7	8	9	10	11	12	13	14	15
Points	25	20	16	13	11	10	9	8	7	6	5	4	3	2	1

== Champions ==
Season	Rider champion	Motorcycle	Team	Manufacturer champion
1999	(United Kingdom) Karl Harris	Suzuki GSX 750 R	GR Motosport	Not awarded
2000	(United Kingdom) James Ellison	Honda 900 CBR	Ten Kate Young Guns	Not awarded
2001	(United Kingdom) James Ellison	Suzuki GSX 1000R	Hi-Peak Crescent Suzuki	Not awarded
2002	(Italy) Vittorio Iannuzzo	Suzuki GSX 1000R	Alstare System Suzuki Italia	Not awarded
2003	(Italy) Michel Fabrizio	Suzuki GSX 1000R	Alstare Suzuki Italia	Not awarded
2004	(Italy) Lorenzo Alfonsi	Yamaha YZF-R1	Italia Lorenzini by Leoni	Not awarded
2005	(Belgium) Didier van Keymeulen	Yamaha YZF-R1	Yamaha Motor Germany	(Japan) Yamaha
2006	(Italy) Alessandro Polita	Suzuki GSXR1000 K6	Celani Suzuki Italia	(Japan) Suzuki
2007	(Italy) Niccolò Canepa	Ducati 1098S	Ducati Xerox Junior Team	(Japan) Yamaha
2008	(Australia) Brendan Roberts	Ducati 1098R	Ducati Xerox Junior Team	(Italy) Ducati
2009	(Belgium) Xavier Siméon	Ducati 1098R	Ducati Xerox Junior Team	(Italy) Ducati
2010	(Italy) Ayrton Badovini	BMW S1000RR	BMW Motorrad Italia STK	(Germany) BMW
2011	(Italy) Davide Giugliano	Ducati 1098R	Althea Racing	(Italy) Ducati
2012	(France) Sylvain Barrier	BMW S1000RR	BMW Motorrad Italia GoldBet	(Japan) Kawasaki
2013	(France) Sylvain Barrier	BMW S1000RR	BMW Motorrad GoldBet STK	(Germany) BMW
2014	(Argentina) Leandro Mercado	Ducati 1199 Panigale R	Barni Racing Team	(Japan) Kawasaki
2015	(Italy) Lorenzo Savadori	Aprilia RSV4 RF	Nuova M2 Racing	(Italy) Aprilia
2016	(Italy) Raffaele De Rosa	BMW S1000RR	Althea BMW Racing Team	(Italy) Ducati
2017	(Italy) Michael Ruben Rinaldi	Ducati 1199 Panigale R	Aruba.it Racing – Junior Team	(Japan) Kawasaki
2018	(Germany) Markus Reiterberger	BMW S1000RR	alpha Racing–Van Zon–BMW	(Germany) BMW

== See also ==
- Superbike World Championship
- Supersport World Championship
- Supersport 300 World Championship
- European Superstock 600 Championship
- Grand Prix motorcycle racing
- Isle of Man TT
