= 2001 Superstock European Championship =

2001 FIM Superstock 1000 Cup
| Previous: | 2000 | Next: | 2002 |
Support series: Superbike World Championship; Supersport World Championship

The 2001 Superstock European Championship was the third season of the FIM Superstock championship. The season began on 11 March at Circuit Ricardo Tormo in Spain, and finished on 30 September at Autodromo Enzo e Dino Ferrari in Italy.

James Ellison won the title after beating closest rival Walter Tortoroglio.

== Race calendar and results ==
| Round | Date | Round | Circuit | Pole position | Fastest lap | Race winner | Winning team | Winning constructor |
|---|---|---|---|---|---|---|---|---|
| 1 | 11 March | Spain | Circuit Ricardo Tormo | (Italy) Walter Tortoroglio | (United Kingdom) James Ellison | (United Kingdom) James Ellison | Tech 2000 | Suzuki |
| 2 | 13 May | Italy | Autodromo Nazionale Monza | (Italy) Walter Tortoroglio | (Italy) Walter Tortoroglio | (Italy) Walter Tortoroglio | DMR Suzuki Italia | Suzuki |
| 3 | 27 May | (United Kingdom) Great Britain | Donington Park | (United Kingdom) Chris Burns | (United Kingdom) Chris Burns | (United Kingdom) James Ellison | Tech 2000 | Suzuki |
| 4 | 10 June | Germany | Lausitzring | (United Kingdom) James Ellison | (United Kingdom) James Ellison | (United Kingdom) James Ellison | Hi-Peak Young Guns | Suzuki |
| 5 | 24 June | San Marino | Autodromo Di Santa Monica | (Italy) Walter Tortoroglio | (United Kingdom) James Ellison | (Spain) Dean Oliver | FBC Racing | Aprilia |
| 6 | 29 July | (European Union) Europe | Brands Hatch | (Italy) Walter Tortoroglio | (Italy) Walter Tortoroglio | (United Kingdom) Mark Heckles | Rumi | Honda |
| 7 | 2 September | Germany | Motorsport Arena Oschersleben | (Italy) Walter Tortoroglio | (United Kingdom) James Ellison | (United Kingdom) James Ellison | Hi-Peak Crescent Suzuki | Suzuki |
| 8 | 9 September | Netherlands | TT Circuit Assen | (United Kingdom) Marty Nutt | (United Kingdom) Marty Nutt | (Italy) Lorenzo Mauri | Pedercini Racing | Ducati |
| 9 | 30 September | Italy | Autodromo Enzo e Dino Ferrari | (Italy) Walter Tortoroglio | (Italy) Walter Tortoroglio | (Italy) Walter Tortoroglio | DMR Suzuki Italia | Suzuki |

== Entry list ==
| Team | Constructor | Motorcycle | No. | Rider | Rounds |
|---|---|---|---|---|---|
| Aprilia | Aprilia | Aprilia RSV 1000 | 43 | (United Kingdom) Steve Brogan | 3 |
| Aprilia | Aprilia | Aprilia RSV 1000 | 54 | (Italy) Ilario Dionisi | 5 |
| Aprilia Desmo Racing | Aprilia | Aprilia RSV 1000 | 16 | (United Kingdom) Andy Notman | 1–3 |
| Aprilia Desmo Racing | Aprilia | Aprilia RSV 1000 | 36 | (Spain) Alex Martinez | 4–8 |
| Aprilia Desmo Racing | Aprilia | Aprilia RSV 1000 | 96 | (Spain) Bernat Martinez | 9 |
| FBC Racing | Aprilia | Aprilia RSV 1000 | 7 | (Spain) Daniel Oliver | All |
| HF Racing | Aprilia | Aprilia RSV 1000 | 50 | (Germany) Daniel Delling | 4, 7 |
| M.C. Mirano | Aprilia | Aprilia RSV 1000 | 71 | (Italy) Fabrizio Pellizzon | 9 |
| Vigo Speed | Aprilia | Aprilia RSV 1000 | 38 | (Italy) Andrea Iommi | 2 |
| DFX Racing | Ducati | Ducati 996S | 16 | (Italy) Lorenzo Alfonsi | All |
| Flanders Motor Racing | Ducati | Ducati 996S | 18 | (Netherlands) John Bakker | All |
| Pedercini Racing | Ducati | Ducati 996S | 5 | (Italy) Dario Tosolini | All |
| Pedercini Racing | Ducati | Ducati 996S | 32 | (Italy) Enrico Pasini | 1–2, 4–5, 7–8 |
| Pedercini Racing | Ducati | Ducati 996S | 90 | (Italy) Lorenzo Mauri | All |
| BKM Racing | Honda | Honda CBR900RR | 4 | (France) Olivier Four | 1–3, 5 |
| BKM Racing | Honda | Honda CBR900RR | 34 | (Belgium) Didier Van Keymeulen | 1–5 |
| BKM Racing | Honda | Honda CBR900RR | 48 | (United Kingdom) Kenny Tibble | 3, 5 |
| BKM Racing | Honda | Honda CBR900RR | 47 | (United Kingdom) Kenny Tibble | 4 |
| BKM Racing | Honda | Honda CBR900RR | 63 | (United Kingdom) Maria Costello | 9 |
| Ghelfi Art | Honda | Honda CBR900RR | 27 | (Italy) Francesco Rafanelli | 1–6, 8–9 |
| Motopower | Honda | Honda CBR900RR | 40 | (United Kingdom) Gary Mason | 3 |
| Rumi | Honda | Honda CBR900RR | 20 | (Italy) Raffaello Fabbroni | All |
| Rumi | Honda | Honda CBR900RR | 23 | (United Kingdom) Mark Heckles | All |
| Stichting Start Nieu | Honda | Honda CBR900RR | 51 | (Netherlands) Bob Withag | 8 |
| Ten Kate Honda | Honda | Honda CBR900RR | 24 | (Netherlands) Kyro Verstraeten | 1–2, 6 |
| Ten Kate Honda | Honda | Honda CBR900RR | 25 | (Australia) Shannon Johnson | 1 |
| Ten Kate Honda | Honda | Honda CBR900RR | 46 | (United Kingdom) Ben Wilson | 3 |
| Ten Kate Honda | Honda | Honda CBR900RR | 51 | (Netherlands) Bob Withag | 4 |
| White Endurance | Honda | Honda CBR900RR | 64 | (Switzerland) Hervé Gantner | 7 |
| White Endurance | Honda | Honda CBR900RR | 69 | (Switzerland) Yann Gyger | 1, 3–9 |
| ESHA Pajic R&D | Kawasaki | Kawasaki ZX-7R | 59 | (Netherlands) Ron Van Steenbergen | 8 |
| Arbizu Racing | Suzuki | Suzuki GSX-R1000 | 17 | (Spain) Emilio Delgado | 1 |
| Arbizu Racing | Suzuki | Suzuki GSX-R1000 | 36 | (Spain) Alex Martinez | 1 |
| Arbizu Racing | Suzuki | Suzuki GSX-R1000 | 37 | (Spain) Jesus Moreno | 1 |
| Arbr 'A' Cames | Suzuki | Suzuki GSX-R1000 | 31 | (France) Ludovic Fourreau | All |
| Brave | Suzuki | Suzuki GSX-R1000 | 53 | (Italy) Marco Tessarolo | 5, 7, 9 |
| Bootsman | Suzuki | Suzuki GSX-R1000 | 61 | (Netherlands) Lee Bootsman | 8 |
| Celani | Suzuki | Suzuki GSX-R1000 | 33 | (Italy) Riccardo Ricci | 1–2, 5, 9 |
| CRT GS Racing | Suzuki | Suzuki GSX-R1000 | 60 | (Netherlands) Robert De Vries | 8 |
| DMR Suzuki Italia | Suzuki | Suzuki GSX-R1000 | 19 | (Italy) Walter Tortoroglio | All |
| DMR Suzuki Italia | Suzuki | Suzuki GSX-R1000 | 28 | (Italy) Giacomo Romanelli | All |
| Eventmaker RG-Sword | Suzuki | Suzuki GSX-R1000 | 47 | (United Kingdom) Chris Miller | 3, 6 |
| GLB 2000 Racing | Suzuki | Suzuki GSX-R1000 | 52 | (Italy) Gianluca Battisti | 5, 9 |
| GR Motorsport | Suzuki | Suzuki GSX-R1000 | 48 | (United Kingdom) Kenny Tibble | 6 |
| Hi-Peak Young Guns; Hi-Peak Crescent Suzuki | Suzuki | Suzuki GSX-R1000 | 1 | (United Kingdom) James Ellison | 4–9 |
| ICSA-T Suzuki | Suzuki | Suzuki GSX-R1000 | 34 | (Belgium) Didier Van Keymeulen | 6–9 |
| KF Racing/RCCS | Suzuki | Suzuki GSX-R1000 | 57 | (United Kingdom) Kevin Falcke | 6 |
| Martin Raynor Cars/Company | Suzuki | Suzuki GSX-R1000 | 41 | (United Kingdom) Kieran Murphy | 3, 6, 8 |
| Martin Raynor Cars/Company | Suzuki | Suzuki GSX-R1000 | 55 | (United Kingdom) David Johnson | 6 |
| Nutt | Suzuki | Suzuki GSX-R1000 | 88 | (United Kingdom) Marty Nutt | 8–9 |
| Redwood Racing; LiveOnScreen-Redwood | Suzuki | Suzuki GSX-R1000 | 3 | (United Kingdom) Chris Burns | 1, 3 |
| Redwood Racing; LiveOnScreen-Redwood | Suzuki | Suzuki GSX-R1000 | 26 | (United Kingdom) Andy Notman | 4–9 |
| Reichmann Racing | Suzuki | Suzuki GSX-R1000 | 58 | (Germany) Christian Nau | 7 |
| Roundstone Racing | Suzuki | Suzuki GSX-R1000 | 3 | (United Kingdom) Chris Burns | 6 |
| Steinhausen Racing | Suzuki | Suzuki GSX-R1000 | 42 | (Germany) Benny Jerzenbeck | All |
| Suzuki Stefan Schmid | Suzuki | Suzuki GSX-R1000 | 2 | (Italy) Markus Wegscheider | All |
| Suzuki Stefan Schmid | Suzuki | Suzuki GSX-R1000 | 22 | (Germany) Benjamin Nabert | All |
| Tech 2000 | Suzuki | Suzuki GSX-R1000 | 1 | (United Kingdom) James Ellison | 1–3 |
| Tech 2000 | Suzuki | Suzuki GSX-R1000 | 4 | (France) Olivier Four | 6–7, 9 |
| Tech 2000 | Suzuki | Suzuki GSX-R1000 | 56 | (France) Pierrot Vanstaen | 6–7, 9 |
| Tech 2000 | Suzuki | Suzuki GSX-R1000 | 88 | (United Kingdom) Marty Nutt | 1–4, 6–7 |
| East Belgium Racing | Yamaha | Yamaha YZF-R1 | 29 | (Belgium) Steve Coopman | All |
| East Belgium Racing | Yamaha | Yamaha YZF-R1 | 30 | (Belgium) Michael Weynand | All |
| East Belgium Racing | Yamaha | Yamaha YZF-R1 | 63 | (United Kingdom) Maria Costello | 7 |
| GiMotor Sport | Yamaha | Yamaha YZF-R1 | 45 | (Italy) Gianluca Vizziello | All |
| KS Racing | Yamaha | Yamaha YZF-R1 | 21 | (Belgium) Koen Vleugels | All |
| Saveko Dee Cee Jeans | Yamaha | Yamaha YZF-R1 | 35 | (Netherlands) Paul Mooijman | All |
| Yamaha Sweden | Yamaha | Yamaha YZF-R1 | 77 | (Sweden) Niklas Carlberg | 1–3, 5–9 |
| Yamaha Teuchert | Yamaha | Yamaha YZF-R1 | 76 | (Austria) Günther Knobloch | All |

Key
Regular rider
Wildcard rider
Replacement rider

== Championship' standings ==
=== Riders' standings ===
| Pos | Rider | Bike | VAL (Spain) | MNZ (Italy) | DON (United Kingdom) | LAU (Germany) | MIS (San Marino) | BRA (Europe) | OSC (Germany) | ASS (Netherlands) | IMO (Italy) | Pts |
|---|---|---|---|---|---|---|---|---|---|---|---|---|
| 1 | (United Kingdom) James Ellison | Suzuki | 1^{F} | 2 | 1 | 1^{PF} | Ret^{F} | 3 | 1^{F} | 6 | 3 | 162 |
| 2 | (Italy) Walter Tortoroglio | Suzuki | 2^{P} | 1^{PF} | 2 | 2 | Ret^{P} | 2^{PF} | 3^{P} | 5 | 1^{PF} | 157 |
| 3 | (United Kingdom) Mark Heckles | Honda | 6 | Ret | 3 | 3 | 2 | 1 | 10 | Ret | 5 | 104 |
| 4 | (United Kingdom) Marty Nutt | Suzuki | 10 | 3 | 7 | Ret | | 6 | 2 | 12^{PF} | 4 | 78 |
| 5 | (Germany) Benny Jerzenbeck | Suzuki | 7 | 4 | 8 | 4 | 4 | 12 | 5 | 15 | 16 | 72 |
| 6 | (Italy) Gianluca Vizziello | Yamaha | 13 | 9 | Ret | 6 | Ret | 8 | 8 | 4 | 6 | 59 |
| 7 | (Italy) Markus Wegscheider | Suzuki | 8 | Ret | 4 | 10 | Ret | DSQ | 6 | 18 | 2 | 57 |
| 8 | (Italy) Dario Tosolini | Ducati | 11 | 5 | 5 | 7 | 5 | 17 | 20 | 9 | 15 | 55 |
| 9 | (Spain) Daniel Oliver | Aprilia | 5 | 8 | Ret | 26 | 1 | Ret | Ret | 8 | Ret | 52 |
| 10 | (Italy) Giacomo Romanelli | Suzuki | 12 | Ret | Ret | 5 | 3 | 9 | 9 | Ret | 11 | 50 |
| 11 | (Italy) Lorenzo Mauri | Ducati | Ret | Ret | 13 | 11 | 13 | 20 | 11 | 1 | 8 | 49 |
| 12 | (Italy) Lorenzo Alfonsi | Ducati | 3 | 6 | Ret | 8 | Ret | Ret | 13 | 10 | 13 | 46 |
| 13 | (France) Olivier Four | Honda | 14 | 10 | 10 | | Ret | | | | | 39 |
| 13 | (France) Olivier Four | Suzuki | | | | | | 7 | 7 | | 7 | 39 |
| 14 | (United Kingdom) Andy Notman | Aprilia | 21 | 17 | Ret | | | | | | | 33 |
| 14 | (United Kingdom) Andy Notman | Suzuki | | | | 9 | Ret | 10 | 4 | 26 | 9 | 33 |
| 15 | (France) Ludovic Fourreau | Suzuki | 15 | 10 | Ret | 13 | 11 | 16 | 12 | 25 | 10 | 25 |
| 16 | (Netherlands) John Bakker | Ducati | Ret | 19 | 18 | 21 | 14 | 24 | 23 | 2 | 25 | 22 |
| 17 | (United Kingdom) Kieran Murphy | Suzuki | | | 9 | | | 4 | | 14 | | 22 |
| 18 | (Netherlands) Bob Withag | Honda | | | | Ret | | | | 3 | | 16 |
| 19 | (Germany) Benjamin Nabert | Suzuki | 17 | 7 | DNS | Ret | 10 | 15 | 17 | 24 | 24 | 16 |
| 20 | (Australia) Shannon Johnson | Honda | 4 | | | | | | | | | 13 |
| 21 | (Italy) Riccardo Ricci | Suzuki | 24 | 13 | | | 9 | | | | 14 | 12 |
| 22 | (United Kingdom) Chris Burns | Suzuki | 22 | | Ret^{PF} | | | 5 | | | | 11 |
| 23 | (Belgium) Didier Van Keymeulen | Honda | 9 | Ret | 17 | 19 | Ret | | | | | 11 |
| 23 | (Belgium) Didier Van Keymeulen | Suzuki | | | | | | 13 | 15 | 16 | 18 | 11 |
| 24 | (Austria) Günther Knobloch | Yamaha | 16 | 10 | Ret | 12 | Ret | 19 | 14 | 21 | 20 | 11 |
| 25 | (United Kingdom) Gary Mason | Honda | | | 6 | | | | | | | 10 |
| 26 | (Italy) Gianluca Battisti | Suzuki | | | | | 6 | | | | 22 | 10 |
| 27 | (Spain) Alex Martinez | Suzuki | WD | | | | | | | | | 10 |
| 27 | (Spain) Alex Martinez | Aprilia | | | | 18 | 15 | 22 | 22 | 7 | | 10 |
| 28 | (Belgium) Michael Weynand | Yamaha | Ret | 14 | Ret | 16 | 8 | Ret | DNS | 19 | Ret | 10 |
| 29 | (Italy) Raffaello Fabbroni | Honda | 18 | DNS | Ret | 23 | 7 | 21 | 21 | Ret | DNS | 9 |
| 30 | (Belgium) Koen Vleugels | Yamaha | Ret | Ret | 16 | 15 | Ret | 14 | 16 | 11 | Ret | 8 |
| 31 | (Switzerland) Yann Gyger | Honda | 19 | | Ret | 20 | 12 | Ret | 18 | 13 | 23 | 7 |
| 32 | (United Kingdom) Steve Brogan | Aprilia | | | 11 | | | | | | | 5 |
| 33 | (United Kingdom) David Johnson | Suzuki | | | | | | 11 | | | | 5 |
| 34 | (Italy) Fabrizio Pellizzon | Aprilia | | | | | | | | | 12 | 4 |
| 35 | (United Kingdom) Chris Miller | Suzuki | | | 12 | | | Ret | | | | 4 |
| 36 | (Netherlands) Paul Mooijman | Yamaha | 26 | 15 | 15 | 14 | Ret | 18 | 24 | Ret | Ret | 4 |
| 37 | (United Kingdom) Kenny Tibble | Honda | | | 14 | Ret | WD | | | | | 2 |
| 37 | (United Kingdom) Kenny Tibble | Suzuki | | | | | | Ret | | | | 2 |
| | (Italy) Enrico Pasini | Ducati | 23 | 16 | | 17 | Ret | | 26 | DNS | | 0 |
| | (Italy) Francesco Rafanelli | Honda | 25 | WD | 19 | 25 | 16 | 25 | | 20 | 27 | 0 |
| | (Netherlands) Robert De Vries | Suzuki | | | | | | | | 17 | | 0 |
| | (Spain) Bernat Martinez | Aprilia | | | | | | | | | 17 | 0 |
| | (Belgium) Steve Coopman | Yamaha | 20 | 18 | Ret | 22 | 17 | 23 | 27 | 27 | 26 | 0 |
| | (Sweden) Niklas Carlberg | Yamaha | Ret | 20 | Ret | | 18 | 26 | 30 | 23 | 28 | 0 |
| | (France) Pierrot Vanstaen | Suzuki | | | | | | DNS | 19 | | 19 | 0 |
| | (Italy) Marco Tessarolo | Suzuki | | | | | Ret | | 28 | | 21 | 0 |
| | (Netherlands) Ron Van Steenbergen | Kawasaki | | | | | | | | 22 | | 0 |
| | (Germany) Daniel Delling | Aprilia | | | | 24 | | | DNS | | | 0 |
| | (Germany) Christian Nau | Suzuki | | | | | | | 25 | | | 0 |
| | (Switzerland) Hervé Gantner | Honda | | | | | | | 29 | | | 0 |
| | (Netherlands) Kyro Verstraeten | Honda | Ret | DNS | | | | Ret | | | | 0 |
| | (Italy) Andrea Iommi | Aprilia | | Ret | | | | | | | | 0 |
| | (United Kingdom) Ben Wilson | Honda | | | Ret | | | | | | | 0 |
| | (United Kingdom) Kevin Falcke | Suzuki | | | | | | DSQ | | | | 0 |
| | (Spain) Jesus Moreno | Suzuki | DNS | | | | | | | | | |
| | (United Kingdom) Maria Costello | Yamaha | | | | | | | DNQ | | | |
| | (United Kingdom) Maria Costello | Honda | | | | | | | | | DNQ | |
| | (Spain) Emilio Delgado | Suzuki | WD | | | | | | | | | |
| | (Italy) Ilario Dionisi | Aprilia | | | | | WD | | | | | |
| | (Netherlands) Lee Bootsman | Suzuki | | | | | | | | WD | | |
| Pos | Rider | Bike | VAL (Spain) | MNZ (Italy) | DON (United Kingdom) | LAU (Germany) | MIS (San Marino) | BRA (Europe) | OSC (Germany) | ASS (Netherlands) | IMO (Italy) | Pts |

| Colour | Result |
|---|---|
| Gold | Winner |
| Silver | Second place |
| Bronze | Third place |
| Green | Points classification |
| Blue | Non-points classification |
| Blue | Non-classified finish (NC) |
| Purple | Retired, not classified (Ret) |
| Red | Did not qualify (DNQ) |
| Red | Did not pre-qualify (DNPQ) |
| Black | Disqualified (DSQ) |
| White | Did not start (DNS) |
| White | Withdrew (WD) |
| White | Race cancelled (C) |
| Blank | Did not practice (DNP) |
| Blank | Did not arrive (DNA) |
| Blank | Excluded (EX) |

P – Pole position
F – Fastest lap
Source :
