= Gary Mason (motorcyclist) =

British motorcycle racer (born 1979)

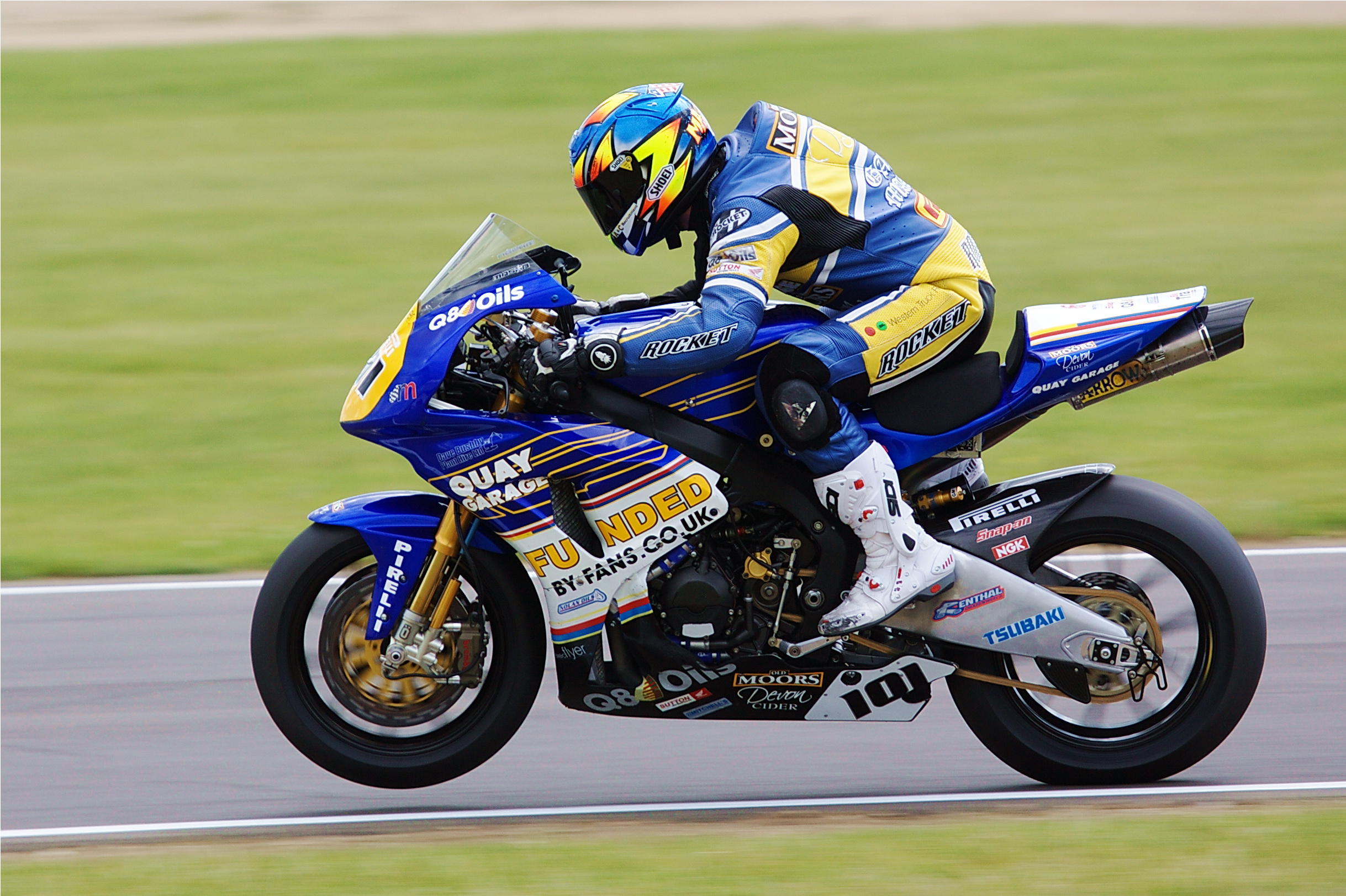
- Gary Mason riding the Quay Garage Honda during the 2009 British Superbikes championship at Snetterton
- Nationality: English
- Born: 4 May 1979 (age 47); Tamworth, Staffordshire
- Current team: Jilted Royalty Prime Factors Racing
- Bike number: 13

Gary Mason is a British motorcycle road racer, born 4 May 1979 in Tamworth, Staffordshire. He is a former British Superbike Championship privateers cup champion. Mason has previously raced in the British Supersport Championship and the AMA supersport and superstock classes. He currently races a BMW S1000RR in the British National Superstock 1000 Championship.

== Career ==
=== Starting out ===
Mason began racing in the 250 Aprilia challenge before moving up to the British Supersport class in 2000.

=== British Supersport Championship (2000–2001) ===
Mason competed in the Supersport class 2000 and 2001, earning his first podium finish (second) at the Brands Hatch Indy circuit in the penultimate round of the 2000 season, overall Mason finished eighth in the Championship, 2001 saw Mason continue in the Supersport class, he finished the season in seventh after a consistent season.

=== British Superbike Championship (2002–2006) ===
Between 2002 and 2006, Mason competed in the British Superbike Championship, Mason struggled in his first season in the championship, retiring 12 times finishing 14th in the Championship. In 2003, Mason's form improved on the previous season, finishing 8th in the championship, having his career-high fourth-place finish on three occasions. Mason then finished 11th, eighth and 17th in the next three years of the championship.

=== AMA (2007–2008) ===
Mason then moved to the AMA series for two years, but did not really make much of an impact in the Supersport or Superstock classes.

=== Return to the British Superbike Championship (2008–2012) ===
Mason returned to the British Superbike championship in 2008 racing for the Quay Garage Honda, competing in the privateers cup finishing third in that championship, Mason was retained at the Quay Garage team for the 2009 the season in which he won the privateers cup. For 2010, Mason moved to the MSS Colchester Kawasaki team, Mason has had mixed results in the 2010 season with a best finish of 7th place in the first race at Oulton Park. For 2011 Mason stayed with the MSS Kawasaki squad, gaining his first ever full BSB podium in race one at Croft, a race which was full of incident with mixed weather conditions.

=== Endurance Racing (2013–2015) ===
Mason joined Prime Factors Racing in the Endurance World Championship.

=== Return to the British Superbike Championship (2016) ===
Mason will return to BSB in 2016 with Prime Factors Racing & arc-on.

== Career statistics ==
Stats correct as of 9 July 2012

=== All Time ===
| Series | Years active | Races | Poles | Podiums | **Wins** | **2nd place** | **3rd place** | Fast Laps | Titles |
| British Superbike **(BSB)** | ^{2002-Pres} | 224 | 0 | 2 | 0 | 0 | 2 | 0 | 0 |
| British Superbike Cup (C) | ^{2008–2009} | 44 | 0 | 34 | 27 | 6 | 1 | 0 | 1 |
| Total | | 224^{1} | 0 | 35 | 27 | 6 | 3 | 0 | 1 |

1. – Total includes all British Superbike Championship rides, riding in the Superbike Cup class doesn't count as a separate ride.

=== Superstock European Championship ===
==== Races by year ====
(key) (Races in bold indicate pole position) (Races in italics indicate fastest lap)

| Year | Bike | 1 | 2 | 3 | 4 | 5 | 6 | 7 | 8 | 9 | Pos | Pts |
|---|---|---|---|---|---|---|---|---|---|---|---|---|
| 2000 | Aprilia/Kawasaki | DON | MNZ | HOC | SMR | VAL | BRA; 6 | OSC; Ret | NED | BRA2; 1 | 13th | 35 |
| 2001 | Honda | VAL | MNZ | DON; 6 | LAU | SMR | BRA | OSC | NED | IMO | 25th | 10 |

=== By championship ===
==== British Superbike Championship & Privateers' Cup ====
| Year | Class | Bike | 1 | | 2 | | 3 | | | 4 | | 5 | | 6 | | | 7 | | | 8 | | | 9 | | | 10 | | 11 | | 12 | | | 13 | | Pos | Pts | Ref |
| Year | Class | Bike | R1 | R2 | R1 | R2 | R1 | R2 | R3 | R1 | R2 | R1 | R2 | R1 | R2 | R3 | R1 | R2 | R3 | R1 | R2 | R3 | R1 | R2 | R3 | R1 | R2 | R1 | R2 | R1 | R2 | R3 | R1 | R2 | Pos | Pts | Ref |
|---|---|---|---|---|---|---|---|---|---|---|---|---|---|---|---|---|---|---|---|---|---|---|---|---|---|---|---|---|---|---|---|---|---|---|---|---|---|
| 2002 | BSB | Honda | SIL; 15 | SIL; Ret | BHI; 10 | BHI; 10 | DON; Ret | DON; Ret | | OUL; 12 | OUL; 13 | SNE; Ret | SNE; Ret | BHGP; Ret | BHGP; Ret | | ROC; 15 | ROC; Ret | | KNO; Ret | KNO; DNS | | THR; 13 | THR; Ret | | CAD; 9 | CAD; Ret | OUL; Ret | OUL; 10 | MAL; 13 | MAL; 11 | | DON; 10 | DON; 9 | 14th | 45 | |
| 2003 | BSB | Yamaha | SIL; 5 | SIL; 8 | SNE; 8 | SNE; 4 | THR; 7 | THR; 6 | | OUL; 7 | OUL; 9 | KNO; 7 | KNO; 6 | BHI; 4 | BHI; 6 | | ROC; Ret | ROC; 7 | | MON; 7 | MON; 4 | | OUL; Ret | OUL; Ret | | CAD; 4 | CAD; 5 | BHGP; 6 | BHGP; 7 | DON; 8 | DON; 7 | | | | 8th | 208 | |
| 2004 | BSB | Yamaha | SIL; Ret | SIL; 8 | BHI; 5 | BHI; 9 | SNE; Ret | SNE; 11 | | OUL; 7 | OUL; 7 | MON; Ret | MON; Ret | THR; 7 | THR; Ret | | BHGP; 10 | BHGP; 10 | | KNO; 6 | KNO; Ret | | MAL; 14 | MAL; 7 | | CRO; Ret | CRO; 6 | CAD; 11 | CAD; Ret | OUL; 11 | OUL; Ret | | DON; 9 | DON; 12 | 11th | 116 | |
| 2005 | BSB | Honda | BHI; Ret | BHI; 10 | THR; 12 | THR; 13 | MAL; 8 | MAL; 7 | | OUL; 7 | OUL; Ret | MON; 8 | MON; 9 | CRO; 9 | CRO; 5 | | KNO; 9 | KNO; 13 | | SNE; 8 | SNE; 8 | | SIL; 7 | SIL; 7 | | CAD; 11 | CAD; 10 | OUL; 9 | OUL; 9 | DON; 10 | DON; 7 | | BHGP; 7 | BHGP; 7 | 8th | 174 | |
| 2006 | BSB | Honda | BHI; 11 | BHI; 14 | DON; 13 | DON; 4 | THR; 17 | THR; 12 | | OUL; Ret | OUL; 14 | MON; C | MON; C | MAL; 11 | MAL; 13 | | SNE; Ret | SNE; 13 | | KNO; 14 | KNO; 17 | | OUL; 12 | OUL; 9 | | CRO; 18 | CRO; Ret | CAD; 12 | CAD; Ret | SIL; DNS | SIL; DNS | | BHGP | BHGP | 17th | 55 | |
| 2008 | BSB | Honda | THR | THR | OUL | OUL | BHGP | BHGP | | DON; 18 | DON; 10 | SNE; 14 | SNE; 12 | MAL; 13 | MAL; 23 | | OUL; Ret | OUL; 14 | | KNO; 10 | KNO; 17 | | CAD; 10 | CAD; Ret | | CRO; 11 | CRO; 11 | SIL; DSQ | SIL; DSQ | BHI; 11 | BHI; 9 | | | | 16th | 51 | |
| 2008 | C | Honda | THR | THR | OUL | OUL | BHGP | BHGP | | DON; 18 | DON; 10 | SNE; 14 | SNE; 12 | MAL; 13 | MAL; 23 | | OUL; Ret | OUL; 14 | | KNO; 10 | KNO; 17 | | CAD; 10 | CAD; Ret | | CRO; 11 | CRO; 11 | SIL; DSQ | SIL; DSQ | BHI; 11 | BHI; 9 | | | | **3rd** | **307** | |
| 2009 | BSB | Honda | BHI; 6 | BHI; 9 | OUL; 9 | OUL; 7 | DON; 12 | DON; 7 | | THR; 9 | THR; 12 | SNE; Ret | SNE; 14 | KNO; Ret | KNO; 10 | | MAL; 6 | MAL; 18 | | BHGP; 13 | BHGP; 14 | BHGP; 15 | CAD; 10 | CAD; 9 | | CRO; 8 | CRO; 8 | SIL; 14 | SIL; Ret | OUL; 13 | OUL; 12 | OUL; 10 | | | 13th | 125 | |
| 2009 | C | Honda | BHI; 6 | BHI; 9 | OUL; 9 | OUL; 7 | DON; 12 | DON; 7 | | THR; 9 | THR; 12 | SNE; Ret | SNE; 14 | KNO; Ret | KNO; 10 | | MAL; 6 | MAL; 18 | | BHGP; 13 | BHGP; 14 | BHGP; 15 | CAD; 10 | CAD; 9 | | CRO; 8 | CRO; 8 | SIL; 14 | SIL; Ret | OUL; 13 | OUL; 12 | OUL; 10 | | | **1st** | **535.5** | |
| 2010 | BSB | Kawasaki | BHI; 13 | BHI; Ret | THR; 8 | THR; 10 | OUL; 7 | OUL; Ret | | CAD; DNS | CAD; DNS | MAL; 12 | MAL; 14 | KNO; 8 | KNO; C | | SNE; 9 | SNE; 11 | SNE; 9 | BHGP; Ret | BHGP; 10 | BHGP; Ret | CAD; Ret | CAD; 10 | | CRO; 10 | CRO; 11 | SIL; 14 | SIL; 7 | OUL; 8 | OUL; 14 | OUL; Ret | | | 12th | 104 | |
| 2011 | BSB | Kawasaki | BHI; 18 | BHI; 10 | OUL; 9 | OUL; 10 | CRO; 3 | CRO; 7 | | THR; Ret | THR; 14 | KNO; 4 | KNO; 6 | SNE; 11 | SNE; 11 | | OUL; 5 | OUL; C | | BHGP; 3 | BHGP; Ret | BHGP; 7 | CAD; 6 | CAD; 10 | CAD; 12 | DON; 17 | DON; 17 | SIL; 14 | SIL; 14 | BHGP; Ret | BHGP; DNS | BHGP; DNS | | | 10th | 139 | |
| 2012 | BSB | Kawasaki | BHI; 5 | BHI; C | THR; 13 | THR; Ret | OUL; DNS | OUL; 18 | OUL; Ret | SNE; Ret | SNE; Ret | KNO | KNO | OUL; Ret | OUL; Ret | OUL; 18 | BHGP | BHGP | | CAD; 20 | CAD; 20 | | DON; 20 | DON; Ret | | ASS | ASS | SIL | SIL | BHGP | BHGP | BHGP | | | 25th | 14 | |

| Year | Make | 1 | | | 2 | | | 3 | | | 4 | | | 5 | | | 6 | | | 7 | | | 8 | | | 9 | | | 10 | | | 11 | | | 12 | | | Pos | Pts |
| Year | Make | R1 | R2 | R3 | R1 | R2 | R3 | R1 | R2 | R3 | R1 | R2 | R3 | R1 | R2 | R3 | R1 | R2 | R3 | R1 | R2 | R3 | R1 | R2 | R3 | R1 | R2 | R3 | R1 | R2 | R3 | R1 | R2 | R3 | R1 | R2 | R3 | Pos | Pts |
|---|---|---|---|---|---|---|---|---|---|---|---|---|---|---|---|---|---|---|---|---|---|---|---|---|---|---|---|---|---|---|---|---|---|---|---|---|---|---|---|
| 2014 | Kawasaki | BHI | BHI | | OUL | OUL | | SNE | SNE | | KNO | KNO | | BHGP; Ret | BHGP; 11 | | THR | THR | | OUL; Ret | OUL; 17 | OUL; 18 | CAD; 16 | CAD; 4 | | DON; Ret | DON; Ret | | ASS; 11 | ASS; Ret | | SIL; 15 | SIL; Ret | | BHGP; 11 | BHGP; DNS | BHGP; DNS | 21st | 29 |

=== MotoAmerica SuperBike Championship ===
==== Races by year ====
| Year | Class | Team | 1 | 2 | | 3 | | 4 | | 5 | | 6 | | 7 | 8 | | 9 | | 10 | | 11 | Pos | Pts |
| Year | Class | Team | R1 | R1 | R2 | R1 | R2 | R1 | R2 | R1 | R2 | R1 | R2 | R1 | R1 | R2 | R1 | R2 | R1 | R2 | R1 | Pos | Pts |
|---|---|---|---|---|---|---|---|---|---|---|---|---|---|---|---|---|---|---|---|---|---|---|---|
| 2006 | SuperBike | Suzuki | DAY | BAR | BAR | FON | FON | INF | INF | RAM | RAM | MIL | MIL | LAG | OHI | OHI | VIR | VIR | RAT; 21 | RAT; 18 | OHI; 26 | 42nd | 28 |

=== MotoAmerica Superstock Championship ===
==== By year ====
| Year | Class | Bike | 1 | 2 | 3 | 4 | 5 | 6 | 7 | 8 | 9 | 10 | 11 | Pos | Pts |
|---|---|---|---|---|---|---|---|---|---|---|---|---|---|---|---|
| 2006 | Superstock | Suzuki | DAY | BAR | FON | INF | RAM | MIL | LAG | OHI | VIR | RAT; 15 | OHI; 13 | 26th | 34 |

=== FIM World Endurance Championship ===
==== By team ====
| Year | Team | Bike | Rider | TC |
|---|---|---|---|---|
| 2004 | Yamaha Austria Racing Team | Yamaha YZF-R1 | (Slovenia) Igor Jerman (Austria) Horst Saiger (Austria) Thomas Hinterreiter (United Kingdom) James Ellison (United Kingdom) Mike Edwards (United Kingdom) Gary Mason (Australia) Dean Thomas (France) Marc Garcia | 4th |
