= 2021 MotoAmerica Superbike Championship =

The 2021 MotoAmerica Superbike Championship season was the 45th season of the premier class of circuit-based motorcycle racing in the United States and the 7th since its renaming to MotoAmerica. Cameron Beaubier entered the season as the defending champion but did not defend his title after moving to the 2021 Moto2 World Championship.

== Calendar and results ==
Round	Circuit	Date	Race 1 Winner	Race 2 Winner	Race 3 Winner
1	(Georgia (U.S. state)) Michelin Raceway Road Atlanta	April 30–May 2	(South Africa) Mathew Scholtz	(United States) Jake Gagne	
2	Virginia International Raceway	May 21–23	(United States) Jake Gagne	(United States) Jake Gagne	
3	(Wisconsin) Road America	June 11–13	(United States) Jake Gagne	(United States) Jake Gagne	
4	(Washington (state)) The Ridge Motorsports Park	June 25–27	(United States) Jake Gagne	(United States) Jake Gagne	
5	(California) WeatherTech Raceway Laguna Seca	July 9–11	(United States) Jake Gagne	(United States) Jake Gagne	
6	(Minnesota) Brainerd International Raceway	July 30–August 1	(United States) Jake Gagne	(United States) Jake Gagne	
7	(Pennsylvania) Pittsburgh International Race Complex	August 13–15	(United States) Jake Gagne	(United States) Jake Gagne	
8	New Jersey Motorsports Park	September 10–12	(United States) Jake Gagne	(United States) Jake Gagne	(United States) Jake Gagne
9	(Alabama) Barber Motorsports Park	September 17–19	(South Africa) Cameron Petersen	(South Africa) Mathew Scholtz	(United States) Jake Gagne

== Teams and riders ==
2021 Entry List
Team	Constructor	No.	Rider	Rounds
Fresh N' Lean Attack Performance Yamaha	Yamaha	2	(United States) Josh Herrin	1–5, 8–9
Fresh N' Lean Attack Performance Yamaha	Yamaha	24	(Spain) Toni Elías	7–8
Fresh N' Lean Attack Performance Yamaha	Yamaha	32	(United States) Jake Gagne	All
Fresh N' Lean Attack Performance Yamaha	Yamaha	69	(United States) JD Beach	6
Westby Racing LLC	Yamaha	11	(South Africa) Mathew Scholtz	All
Panera Bread Ducati	Ducati	24	(Spain) Toni Elías	5
Panera Bread Ducati	Ducati	33	(United States) Kyle Wyman	1–3, 7–9
Fly Racing ADR Motorsports	Suzuki	25	(Australia) David Anthony	1–7, 9
Fly Racing ADR Motorsports	Suzuki	36	(United States) Jayson Uribe	1–5, 8–9
Fly Racing ADR Motorsports	Suzuki	57	(United Kingdom) Bradley Ward	6–8
Legacy Dental PC	Yamaha	31	(United States) Jeffrey Purk	1–3, 5–9
M4 ECSTAR Suzuki	Suzuki	45	(South Africa) Cameron Petersen	All
M4 ECSTAR Suzuki	Suzuki	50	(United States) Bobby Fong	All
Warhorse HSBK Racing Ducati New York	Ducati	76	(France) Loris Baz	All
Scheibe Racing	BMW	80	(Spain) Héctor Barberá	All
Thrashed Bike Racing LLC	Yamaha	88	(United Kingdom) Max Flinders	All
Zlock Racing	Kawasaki	91	(United States) Kevin Pinkstaff	4
O.C. Racing	Yamaha	95	(Portugal) Mathew Cunha	2, 4–6
Superbike Unlimited Racing	Kawasaki	96	(United States) Jason Aguilar	9
2021 Superbike Cup Entry List
Team	Constructor	No.	Rider	Rounds
Travis Wyman Racing	BMW	10	(United States) Travis Wyman	All
Franklin Armory/Disrupt/RG Racing	Kawasaki	14	(United States) Andrew Lee	All
Hunter Dunham Racing	Yamaha	19	(United States) Hunter Dunham	All
Jones Honda	Honda	22	(United States) Ashton Yates	2–3, 5–9
HONOS HVMC Racing	Kawasaki	23	(United States) Corey Alexander	All
Schmotter Motion Racing	Yamaha	26	(United States) Jake Schmotter	3, 6
Disrupt Racing	Suzuki	34	(United States) Danny Eslick	9
Disrupt Racing	Yamaha	44	(United States) Mark Heckles	8
4 Wheel Specialty	BMW	39	(United States) Volga Mermut	4
Speed Monkey Racing	BMW	42	(United States) Jeremy Coffey	All
Limitless Racing	Kawasaki	48	(United States) Joseph Giannotto	1–3, 7–9
Michael Gilbert Racing	Kawasaki	55	(United States) Michael Gilbert	All
Ridge Motorsports Park/DiBrino Racing	Kawasaki	62	(United States) Andy DiBrino	4–5
BPR Tuning	Yamaha	70	(United States) Bryce Prince	5
Tango Racing	Kawasaki	71	(Uruguay) Maximiliano Gerardo	1–5, 7
AGVSPORT Monkey Moto	Yamaha	72	(United Kingdom) Steven Shakespeare	8
Pegram Racing	Ducati	73	(United States) Larry Pegram	3
Clonnabis LLC Racing	Yamaha	73	(Brazil) Sebastião Ferreira	5
369 Racing	BMW	74	(United States) Aaron Risinger	7
Toby K Racing	Suzuki	75	(United States) Toby Khamsouk	9
Franklin Armory/Disrupt Racing	Suzuki	77	(United States) Hayden Gillim	7
Franklin Armory/Disrupt Racing	Kawasaki	86	(United States) Jason Farrell	3, 5–6
TheHomeProz Racing Team	Kawasaki	78	(United States) Chad Lewin	5
M4 ECSTAR Suzuki	Suzuki	79	(United States) Wyatt Farris	All
Altus Motorsports	Suzuki	85	(United States) Jake Lewis	All
Tecfil Racing Team	BMW	94	(Brazil) Danilo Lewis	All
Geoff May Racing/VisionWheel.com	Honda	99	(United States) Geoff May	1–3, 9
Nielsen Racing	Kawasaki	473	(United States) Justin Miest	6
Edge Racing	BMW	960	(United States) Jason Waters	7

== Championship standings ==
=== Riders' championship ===
Scoring system

Points are awarded to the top fifteen finishers. A rider has to finish the race to earn points.

Position	1st	2nd	3rd	4th	5th	6th	7th	8th	9th	10th	11th	12th	13th	14th	15th
Points	25	20	16	13	11	10	9	8	7	6	5	4	3	2	1

Pos	Rider	Bike	RAT (Georgia (U.S. state))		VIR (Virginia)		RAM (Wisconsin)		RID (Washington (state))		MON (California)		BRA (Minnesota)		PIT (Pennsylvania)		NJE (New Jersey)			ALA (Alabama)			Pts
Pos	Rider	Bike	R1	R2	R1	R2	R1	R2	R1	R2	R1	R2	R1	R2	R1	R2	R1	R2	R3	R1	R2	R3	Pts
1	(United States) Jake Gagne	Yamaha	Ret	1	1	1	1	1	1	1	1	1	1	1	1	1	1	1	1	12	3	1	445
2	(South Africa) Mathew Scholtz	Yamaha	1	2	2	3	6	3	5	4	4	3	3	2	3	2	2	2	2	2	1	2	357
3	(South Africa) Cameron Petersen	Suzuki	4	4	5	7	3	2	3	6	3	4	4	5	4	6	7	5	5	1	4	5	264
4	(France) Loris Baz	Ducati	Ret	20	4	2	2	Ret	4	3	2	2	DNS	3	Ret	5	5	4	4	3	2	3	238
5	(United States) Bobby Fong	Suzuki	2	5	12	5	4	4	8	7	7	6	2	4	8	3	4	Ret	9	10	8	8	207
6	(United States) Josh Herrin	Yamaha	3	3	3	4	5	5	2	2	5	5					6	3	3	9	Ret	10	200
7	(Spain) Héctor Barberá	BMW	6	7	6	8	8	6	Ret	5	6	8	5	7	5	7	25	6	7	8	10	Ret	157
8	(United States) Jake Lewis	Suzuki	11	9	9	Ret	11	8	9	14	9	12	7	8	9	9	9	8	12	5	5	9	131
9	(United States) Kyle Wyman	Ducati	5	6	7	6	7	Ret							6	8	8	7	8	Ret	7	6	111
10	(United States) Corey Alexander	Kawasaki	Ret	11	11	9	13	10	6	9	13	21	13	10	11	12	11	Ret	DNS	Ret	11	7	83
11	(United States) Travis Wyman	BMW	7	8	10	11	12	9	NC	11	10	9	15	12	14	11	15	12	18	Ret	12	11	83
12	(Spain) Toni Elías	Ducati									8	7											76
12	(Spain) Toni Elías	Yamaha													2	4	3	Ret	6				76
13	(United States) Michael Gilbert	Kawasaki	10	14	15	12	15	11	11	Ret	18	11	11	13	13	Ret	14	10	16	11	13	DNS	56
14	(Australia) David Anthony	Suzuki	DNS	DNS	Ret	Ret	9	7	7	8	DNS	Ret	9	15	Ret	16				7	14	Ret	52
15	(United States) Ashton Yates	Honda			DNS	DNS	DNS	DNS			15	16	Ret	DNS	Ret	DNS	13	9	11	4	6	4	52
16	(Brazil) Danilo Lewis	BMW	8	13	21	13	17	19	14	12	Ret	Ret	14	14	22	14	16	11	10	Ret	Ret	12	41
17	(United States) Jayson Uribe	Suzuki	16	10	8	Ret	Ret	14	10	10	11	DNS					12	18	14	DNS	DNS	DNS	39
18	(United States) Andrew Lee	Kawasaki	Ret	Ret	16	10	14	12	12	15	16	15	8	DNS	Ret	13	17	Ret	15	DNS	DNS	DNS	30
19	(United Kingdom) Bradley Ward	Suzuki											10	9	7	Ret	10	Ret	DNS				28
20	(United States) Wyatt Farris	Suzuki	DNS	17	17	15	18	15	13	17	19	14	12	11	12	DNS	18	13	13	14	18	17	28
21	(United Kingdom) Max Flinders	Yamaha	13	15	14	14	16	13	Ret	Ret	17	13	17	18	15	15	19	14	17	13	19	16	21
22	(United States) Geoff May	Honda	9	12	13	DNS	10	DNS												DNS	DNS	DNS	20
23	(United States) JD Beach	Yamaha											6	6									20
24	(United States) Danny Eslick	Suzuki																		6	9	13	20
25	(United States) Hayden Gillim	Suzuki													10	10							12
26	(United States) Bryce Prince	Yamaha									12	10											10
27	(United States) Joseph Giannotto	Kawasaki	12	16	19	17	20	Ret							20	19	22	17	21	15	16	15	6
28	(United States) Andy DiBrino	Kawasaki							DNS	13	14	DNS											5
29	(United States) Jason Aguilar	Kawasaki																		Ret	15	14	3
30	(United States) Jeffrey Purk	Yamaha	14	19	22	Ret	23	18			21	20	Ret	DNS	19	20	23	19	22	Ret	20	DNS	2
31	(United States) Jeremy Coffey	BMW	DNS	DNS	18	16	21	DNS	15	16	20	17	19	19	18	17	24	15	20	DNS	DNS	DNS	2
32	(United States) Hunter Dunham	Yamaha	15	18	20	18	19	16	DNS	DNS	DNS	18	DNS	17	17	18	21	16	19	DNS	DNS	DNS	1
	(United States) Jake Schmotter	Yamaha					24	17					18	16									0
	(United States) Toby Khamsouk	Suzuki																		16	17	DNS	0
	(United States) Jason Farrell	Kawasaki					Ret	Ret			Ret	19	16	DNS									0
	(Portugal) Mathew Cunha	Yamaha			DNS	DNS			16	Ret	DNS	Ret	DNS	DNS									0
	(United States) Jason Waters	BMW													16	DNS							0
	(United States) Kevin Pinkstaff	Kawasaki							17	Ret													0
	(United States) Volga Mermut	BMW							18	18													0
	(United Kingdom) Steven Shakespeare	Yamaha															NC	20	Ret				0
	(United States) Justin Miest	Kawasaki											Ret	20									0
	(United States) Mark Heckles	Yamaha															20	DNS	Ret				0
	(United States) Aaron Risinger	BMW													21	21							0
	(Uruguay) Maximiliano Gerardo	Kawasaki	DNS	DNS	DNS	DNS	22	DNS	DNS	DNS	DNS	DNS			Ret	DNS							0
	(United States) Larry Pegram	Ducati					Ret	DNS															0
	(Brazil) Sebastião Ferreira	Yamaha									DNS	DNS											0
	(United States) Chad Lewin	Kawasaki									DNS	DNS											0
Pos	Rider	Bike	RAT (Georgia (U.S. state))		VIR (Virginia)		RAM (Wisconsin)		RID (Washington (state))		MON (California)		BRA (Minnesota)		PIT (Pennsylvania)		NJE (New Jersey)			ALA (Alabama)			Pts

=== Superbike Cup ===
Pos	Rider	Bike	RAT (Georgia (U.S. state))		VIR (Virginia)		RAM (Wisconsin)		RID (Washington (state))		MON (California)		BRA (Minnesota)		PIT (Pennsylvania)		NJE (New Jersey)			ALA (Alabama)			Pts
Pos	Rider	Bike	R1	R2	R1	R2	R1	R2	R1	R2	R1	R2	R1	R2	R1	R2	R1	R2	R3	R1	R2	R3	Pts
1	(United States) Jake Lewis	Suzuki	5	2	1	Ret	2	1	2	5	1	4	1	1	1	1	1	1	3	2	1	3	397
2	(United States) Travis Wyman	BMW	1	1	2	3	3	2	NC	2	2	1	7	4	6	3	5	5	7	Ret	5	4	290
3	(United States) Corey Alexander	Kawasaki	Ret	3	3	1	4	3	1	1	4	11	5	2	3	4	2	Ret	DNS	Ret	4	2	267
4	(United States) Michael Gilbert	Kawasaki	4	6	5	4	6	4	3	Ret	8	3	3	5	5	Ret	4	3	6	4	6	DNS	210
5	(Brazil) Danilo Lewis	BMW	2	5	11	5	7	9	6	3	Ret	Ret	6	6	12	6	6	4	1	Ret	Ret	5	182
6	(United States) Wyatt Farris	Suzuki	DNS	8	7	6	8	6	5	8	9	5	4	3	4	DNS	8	6	4	5	9	8	181
7	(United States) Ashton Yates	Honda			DNS	DNS	DNS	DNS			6	7	DNS	DNS	Ret	DNS	3	2	2	1	2	1	145
8	(United States) Andrew Lee	Kawasaki	Ret	Ret	6	2	5	5	4	6	7	6	2	DNS	Ret	5	7	Ret	5	DNS	DNS	DNS	145
9	(United States) Jeremy Coffey	BMW	DNS	DNS	8	7	11	DNS	7	7	10	8	10	9	9	7	12	7	9	DNS	DNS	DNS	103
10	(United States) Joseph Giannotto	Kawasaki	6	7	9	8	10	Ret							10	9	11	9	10	6	7	7	99
11	(United States) Hunter Dunham	Yamaha	7	9	10	9	9	7	DNS	DNS	DNS	9	DNS	8	8	8	10	8	8	DNS	DNS	DNS	98
12	(United States) Geoff May	Honda	3	4	4	DNS	1	DNS												DNS	DNS	DNS	67
13	(United States) Danny Eslick	Suzuki																		3	3	6	42
14	(United States) Hayden Gillim	Suzuki													2	2							40
15	(United States) Bryce Prince	Yamaha									3	2											36
16	(United States) Jake Schmotter	Yamaha					13	8					9	7									27
17	(United States) Andy DiBrino	Kawasaki							DNS	4	5	DNS											24
18	(United States) Toby Khamsouk	Suzuki																		7	8	DNS	17
19	(United States) Volga Mermut	BMW							8	9													15
20	(United States) Jason Farrell	Kawasaki					Ret	Ret			Ret	10	8	DNS									14
21	(United States) Aaron Risinger	BMW													11	10							11
22	(United States) Jason Waters	BMW													7	DNS							9
23	(United States) Mark Heckles	Yamaha															9	DNS	Ret				7
24	(United Kingdom) Steven Shakespeare	Yamaha															NC	10	Ret				6
25	(United States) Justin Miest	Kawasaki											Ret	10									6
26	(Uruguay) Maximiliano Gerardo	Kawasaki	DNS	DNS	DNS	DNS	12	DNS	DNS	DNS	DNS	DNS			Ret	DNS							4
	(United States) Larry Pegram	Ducati					Ret	DNS															0
	(Brazil) Sebastião Ferreira	Yamaha									DNS	DNS											0
	(United States) Chad Lewin	Kawasaki									DNS	DNS											0
Pos	Rider	Bike	RAT (Georgia (U.S. state))		VIR (Virginia)		RAM (Wisconsin)		RID (Washington (state))		MON (California)		BRA (Minnesota)		PIT (Pennsylvania)		NJE (New Jersey)			ALA (Alabama)			Pts
