= Mark Heckles =

British motorcycle racer

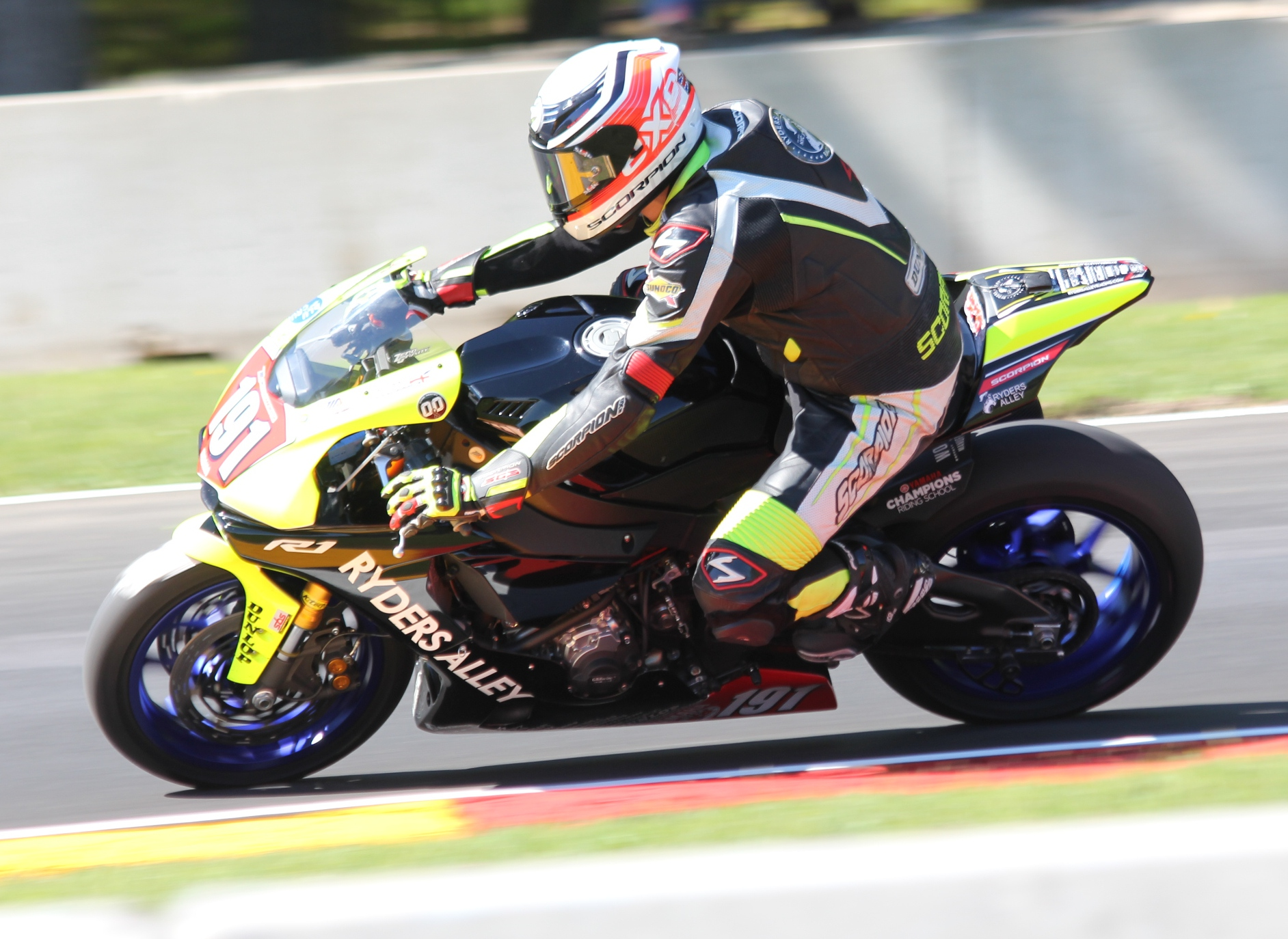
- Heckles leaning left at Road America in 2015
- Born: 4 March 1976 (age 50)
- Height: 5 ft 8 in (1.73 m)

Mark Heckles is a British professional motorcycle racer.

Heckles is the son of Keith Heckles, the 1976 Manx Grand Prix lap record holder.

In 1994, Heckles started competing professionally on an international level. That same year, he operated as a self-funded privateer. In 2015, Heckles joined Ryders Alley Racing in the MotoAmerica road racing series.

== Career ==
- 2014 5 Expert Championships, CCS Atlantic Championship, Atlantic Region: Overall
- Points 3rd Place, Mid Atlantic Region: Overall Points 3rd Place
- 2013 CCS Atlantic Championship. Multiple wins and podiums in all classes.
- 2006 Aintree Clubmans Championship. Multiple wins
- 2004 British Superstock Championship.
- 2003 British Superbike Championship.
- 2002 World Superbike Championship.
- 2001 European Superstock Championship. Finished 3rd in Championship.
- 2000 British 250 Aprilia Challenge.
- 1999 British Supersport Championship.
- 1997-1998 Club Championships TZR125 & RS125
- 1996 British Superteen challenge.
- 1994-95 Two-time British Mini Moto Champion with Polini.

== Career statistics ==
=== Superstock European Championship ===
==== Races by year ====
(key) (Races in bold indicate pole position) (Races in italics indicate fastest lap)

Year	Bike	1	2	3	4	5	6	7	8	9	Pos	Pts
2000	Honda	DON	MNZ	HOC	SMR	VAL	BRA	OSC	NED	BRA2; 2	22nd	20
2001	Honda	VAL; 2	MNZ; 1	DON; 2	LAU; 2	SMR; Ret	BRA; 2	OSC; 3	NED; 5	IMO; 1	2nd	157

=== MotoAmerica SuperBike Championship ===
Year	Class	Team	1		2		3		4		5		6		7		8			9			Pos	Pts
Year	Class	Team	R1	R2	R1	R2	R1	R2	R1	R2	R1	R2	R1	R2	R1	R2	R1	R2	R3	R1	R2	R3	Pos	Pts
2021	SuperBike	Yamaha	ATL	ATL	VIR	VIR	RAM	RAM	TRD	TRD	LGS	LGS	BRA	BRA	PIT	PIT	NJR; 20	NJR; DNS	NJR; Ret	ALA	ALA	ALA	NC	0
