= Parella (disambiguation) =

Parella is a municipality in the Metropolitan City of Turin in the Italian region Piedmont.

Parella may also refer to:

- Colleretto Parella, comune in the Metropolitan City of Turin in the Italian region Piedmont
- Parella, Portuguese name for the Parel area of Mumbai
- Tony Parella, president and CEO of the Sportscar Vintage Racing Association

== See also ==
- Barella
- Parel (disambiguation)
