= 2022 North America Talent Cup =

2022 North America Talent Cup
Previous:	none	Next:	2023

The 2022 North America Talent Cup is the inaugural season of the North America Talent Cup. The season opener was held alongside the MotoGP series event, the Motorcycle Grand Prix of the Americas, at COTA and will end at MotoAmerica's final round of 2022 at Barber Motorsports Park in Alabama. The inaugural season will feature only 20 riders, all racing on the Aprilia RS250SP2. The top two at the end of the season will be invited to join in the selection event for the 2023 Red Bull MotoGP Rookies Cup.

== Calendar ==
Calendar
Round	Circuit	Date
1	Circuit of the Americas, Austin, Texas	April 10
2	High Plains Raceway, Deer Trail, Colorado	May 8
3	(Washington (state)) Ridge Motorsports Park, Shelton, Washington	June 26
4	(Georgia (U.S. state)) Roebling Road Raceway, Bloomingdale, Georgia	July 17
5	Pittsburgh International Race Complex, Wampum, Pennsylvania	August 14
6	(Georgia (U.S. state)) Michelin Raceway Road Atlanta, Braselton, Georgia	September 4
7	Barber Motorsports Park, Birmingham, Alabama	September 25

== Entries ==
Entry list
Bike	Team	No.	Rider	Rounds
Aprilia RS250SP2	B&M American Racing Team	7	(United States) Alessandro DiMario	1
Aprilia RS250SP2	Moo Racing	9	(United States) Matthew Chapin	1
Aprilia RS250SP2	Monkey Ranch USA	10	(Mexico) Emiliano Arciniega	1
Aprilia RS250SP2	Monk Moto	11	(United States) Logan Monk	1
Aprilia RS250SP2	Fernandez Racing	13	(United States) Jayden Fernandez	1
Aprilia RS250SP2	Eleven Motorsport	14	(United States) Chase Black	1
Aprilia RS250SP2	PhilDeBeast Racing	23	(Canada) Philip Degama-Blanchet	1
Aprilia RS250SP2	California Mini Grand Prix	25	(United States) Alexander Enriquez	1
Aprilia RS250SP2	Chris Clark Racing	27	(United States) Chris Clark	1
Aprilia RS250SP2	NJ Moto Racing	29	(United States) Suhaib Salem	1
Aprilia RS250SP2	BBV #34	34	(United States) Britanni Vaccarino	1
Aprilia RS250SP2	Team Sanchez Racing	38	(United States) Adrian Sanchez	1
Aprilia RS250SP2	Singh Racing	54	(United States) Dylan Singh	1
Aprilia RS250SP2	NJ Moto Racing	58	(United States) Logan Cunnison	1
Aprilia RS250SP2	California Mini Grand Prix	66	(United States) Haydn Meng	1
Aprilia RS250SP2	TPL Racing	72	(Canada) Jack Beaudry	1
Aprilia RS250SP2	Ocho Uno Racing	81	(United States) David Roth Jr.	1
Aprilia RS250SP2	2B Motorsports	93	(United States) Jediah Cumbermack	
Aprilia RS250SP2	Aiden Sneed 613 Racing	95	(United States) Aiden Sneed	1
Aprilia RS250SP2	Jesse James Racing	99	(United States) Jesse Shedden	1
Source: MotoGP.com

== Calendar ==
Round	Circuit	Pole position	Fastest lap	Race winner
1	(Texas) Circuit of the Americas	(United States) Jesse Shedden	(United States) Jesse Shedden	(United States) Jesse Shedden
1	(Texas) Circuit of the Americas		(United States) Jesse Shedden	(United States) Jesse Shedden
2	(Colorado) High Plains Raceway			(United States) Alessandro DiMario
2	(Colorado) High Plains Raceway			(United States) Jesse Shedden
3	(Washington (state)) Ridge Motorsports Park			(United States) Alessandro DiMario
3	(Washington (state)) Ridge Motorsports Park			(United States) Alessandro DiMario
4	(Georgia (U.S. state)) Roebling Road Raceway			(United States) Alexander Enriquez
4	(Georgia (U.S. state)) Roebling Road Raceway			(United States) Chris Clark
5	(Pennsylvania) Pittsburgh International Race Complex			
6	(Georgia (U.S. state)) Michelin Raceway Road Atlanta			
7	(Alabama) Barber Motorsports Park			

== Championship standings ==
Points were awarded to the top fifteen riders, provided the rider finished the race.

Position	1st	2nd	3rd	4th	5th	6th	7th	8th	9th	10th	11th	12th	13th	14th	15th
Points	25	20	16	13	11	10	9	8	7	6	5	4	3	2	1

Pos.	Rider	Team	TEX (Texas)		COL (Colorado)	WSH (Washington (state))	GEO (Georgia (U.S. state))	PEN (Pennsylvania)	ATL (Georgia (U.S. state))	ALA (Alabama)	Pts
1	(United States) Jesse Shedden	Jesse James Racing	1^{PF}	1^{P}							50
2	(United States) Aiden Sneed	Aiden Sneed 613 Racing	2	4							36
3	(United States) Alassandro DiMario	B&M American Racing Team	3	3							32
4	(United States) Alexander Enriquez	California Mini Grand Prix	7	2							29
5	(United States) Jayden Fernandez	Fernandez Racing	4	5							24
6	(United States) Logan Cunnison	NJ Moto Racing	8	6							18
7	(United States) Chase Black	Eleven Motorsport	6	10							16
8	(Mexico) Emiliano Arciniega	Monkey Ranch USA	10	8							12
9	(United States) Brittani Vaccarino	BBV #34	5	Ret							11
10	(United States) Logan Monk	Monk Moto	9	12							11
11	(United States) Suhaib Salem	NJ Moto Racing	Ret	7							9
12	(Canada) Philip Degama-Blanchet	PhilDeBeast Racing	9	14							9
13	(United States) Adrian Sanchez	Team Sanchez Racing	11	12							9
14	(United States) Haydn Meng	California Mini Grand Prix	13	11							8
15	(United States) David Roth Jr.	Ocho Uno Racing	14	13							7
16	(United States) Matthew Chapin	Moo Racing	15	15							2
17	(Canada) Jack Beaudry	TPL Racing	16	16							0
18	(United States) Dylan Singh	Singh Racing	Ret	17							0
19	(United States) Chris Clark	Chris Clark	17	Ret							0
	(United States) Jediah Cumbermack	2B Motorsports									
