= Austin Speedtour =

Trans-Am Series
- Venue: Circuit of the Americas
- First race: 2015
- Most wins (rider): Ernie Francis Jr. (4)
- Most wins (manufacturer): Chevrolet (16)

The COTA SpeedTour Experience Motorsports (known as the Trans-Am at COTA or Austin Speedtour or COTA Trans Am 100 or Heacock Classic from Trans-Am or The Heacock Classic or Mission Foods Austin Speedtour) called for sponsorship reasons, is a Trans-Am Race that was held for the first time in the 2015 Trans-Am Series at Circuit of the Americas and was added as an expansion to the schedule. The race is usually held on October or November in the Trans-Am Series schedule. The race is scheduled with the Sportscar Vintage Racing Association for the weekend. The West Coast Championship race has been added along the National Championship race since 2017 making Circuit of the Americas one of the tracks to host both events on the same weekend. Circuit of the Americas provided the closest finish in Trans-Am history, it was in the 2018 TA2 race when Gar Robinson passed Misha Goikhberg at the COTA Muscle Car Challenge by .064 seconds. There was another record made when 52 cars field the 2021 COTA TA2 race. The track has been part of two championships clinching races in the TA2 class (2019 & 2021). COTA has hosted once the season finale and that was in 2021. The race is held under The Trans Am Series presented by Pirelli name, it is sanctioned by SCCA Pro Racing owned by Parella Motorsports Holdings (PMH)

== Official names and sponsors ==
- 2015–2016: Trans-Am at COTA
- 2017: The Trans American Muscle Car Challenge from COTA
- 2018: COTA Muscle Car Challenge at Circuit of The Americas
- 2019-2020: U.S. Vintage National Championship
- 2021–2022: Heacock Classic from Trans-Am (with Austin Speedtour)
- 2022-2024: Austin Speedtour presented by Mission Foods
- 2025: COTA SpeedTour Experience Motorsports
- 2026: Garage Living Racing America @ COTA

== Winners of the Austin Speedtour ==
=== National Championship ===
| Year | Circuit | Date | TA Winning driver | TA Winning vehicle | TA2 Winning driver | TA2 Winning vehicle | TA3-I Winning driver | TA3-I Winning vehicle | TA3-A Winning driver | TA3-A Winning vehicle |
|---|---|---|---|---|---|---|---|---|---|---|
| 2015 | Circuit of the Americas | November 8 | (United States) Amy Ruman | Chevrolet Corvette | (United States) Adam Andretti | Chevrolet Camaro | (Panama) Fernando Seferlis | Aston Martin GT4 | (United States) Ernie Francis, Jr. | Chevrolet Camaro |
| Year | Circuit | Date | TA Winning driver | TA Winning vehicle | TA2 Winning driver | TA2 Winning vehicle | TA3 Winning driver | TA3 Winning vehicle | TA4 Winning driver | TA4 Winning vehicle |
| 2016 | Circuit of the Americas | November 5 | (United States) Paul Fix | Chevrolet Corvette | (United States) Dillon Machavern | Ford Mustang | (United States) Tim Kezman | Porsche 997 | (United States) Todd Napieralski | Ford Mustang |
| 2017 | Circuit of the Americas | November 4 | (United States) Ernie Francis, Jr. | Ford Mustang | (United States) Shane Lewis | Chevrolet Camaro | (United States) Jason Daskalos | Dodge Viper Competition Coupe | (United States) Shane Lewis | Chevrolet Camaro |
| 2018 | Circuit of the Americas | November 1–3 | (United States) Ernie Francis, Jr. | Ford Mustang | (United States) Gar Robinson | Chevrolet Camaro | (United States) Ryan Dexter | Ginetta G55 | (United States) Warren Dexter | Ginetta G55 |
| Year | Circuit | Date | TA Winning driver | TA2 Winning driver | XGT Winning driver | SGT Winning driver | GT Winning driver | | | |
| 2019 | Circuit of the Americas† | October 4–6 | (United States) Adam Andretti | (United States) Marc Miller | no entries | (United States) Ken Thwaits | (United States) Joe Bogetich* | | | |
| 2020 | Circuit of the Americas† | November 6–8 | (United States) Boris Said | (United States) Rafa Matos | (United States) Jason Daskalos | (United States) Lou Gigliotti | (United States) Billy Griffin | | | |
| 2021 | Circuit of the Americas | November 5–7 | (Australia) Matthew Brabham | (Brazil) Rafa Matos | (United States) Erich Joiner | (United States) Natalie Decker | (United States) Sean Young | | | |
| Year | Circuit | Date | TA Winning driver | TA2 Winning driver | XGT Winning driver | SGT Winning driver | GT Winning driver | TAH Winning driver | | |
| 2022 | Circuit of the Americas | November 4–6 | (United States) Chris Dyson | (United States) Thomas Merrill | (United States) Marc Austin | (United States) Dirk Leuenberger | (United States) Chris Coffey | (United States) Adam Andretti | | |
| 2023 | Circuit of the Americas | November 2–5 | (United States) Gar Robinson | (United States) Thomas Annunziata | (United States) Xuanqian Wang | (United States) Michael LaPaglia | (United States) Chris Coffey | | | |
| 2024 | Circuit of the Americas | November 1–3 | (United States) Chris Dyson | (United States) Brett Crews | (United States) Will Rodgers | (United States) Joshua Carlson | (United States) Chris Coffey | | | |

Race is combined with Trans-Am West Coast Series
Races are part of the Southern Cup

† Race is held in combination with the Trans Am West Coast Championship

* Unofficial Winner

=== West Coast Championship ===
| Year | Circuit | Date | TA Winning driver | TA Winning vehicle | TA2 Winning driver | TA2 Winning vehicle | TA3 Winning driver | TA3 Winning vehicle | TA4 Winning driver | TA4 Winning vehicle |
|---|---|---|---|---|---|---|---|---|---|---|
| 2017 | Circuit of the Americas | November 4 | (United States) Tomy Drissi | Chevrolet Corvette | (United States) Shane Lewis | Chevrolet Camaro | No entries | | (United States) Guy Dreier | Maserati GranTurismo MC GT4 |
| 2018 | Circuit of the Americas | November 1–3 | (United States) Ernie Francis, Jr. | Ford Mustang | (United States) Gar Robinson | Chevrolet Camaro | (United States) Ryan Dexter | Ginetta G55 | (United States) Warren Dexter | Ginetta G55 |
| Year | Circuit | Date | TA Winning driver | TA2 Winning driver | XGT Winning driver | SGT Winning driver | GT Winning driver | | | |
| 2019 | Circuit of the Americas | October 4–6 | (United States) Adam Andretti | (United States) Brad McAllister | no entries | (United States) Ken Thwaits | (United States) Joe Bogetich* | | | |
| 2020 | Circuit of the Americas | November 6–8 | (United States) Greg Pickett | (United States) Jim Gallaugher | None entered | (United States) Natalie Decker | (United States) Sean Young | | | |
| 2021 | Circuit of the Americas | November 6–7 | None entered | (United States) Ken Sutherland | (United States) Erich Joiner | (United States) Cindi Lux | None entered | | | |
| Year | Circuit | Date | TA2 Winning driver | SGT Winning driver | GT Winning driver | XGT Winning driver | TA Winning driver | | | |
| 2022 | Circuit of the Americas | November 4–6 | (United States) Cody Powell | (United States) Michael LaPaglia | (United States) Xuangian Wang | (United States) Matt Crandall | | | | |
| 2023 | Circuit of the Americas | November 2–5 | (United States) Thomas Annunziata | (United States) Michael LaPaglia | (United States) Chris Coffey | (United States) Xuanqian Wang | (United States) Gar Robinson | | | |
| 2024 | Circuit of the Americas | November 1–3 | (United States) Brett Crews | (United States) Joshua Carlson | (United States) Chris Coffey | (United States) Will Rodgers | (United States) Chris Dyson | | | |

Race is combined with Trans-Am National Series
COTA West Winner, Michele Abbate crossed the finish line first, but was later penalized for passing under a double yellow flag.

* Unofficial Winner
