= Bagger World Cup =

Class of motorcycle racing

Harley-Davidson Bagger World Cup
- Category: Motorcycle racing
- Region: Europe and North America
- Inaugural season: 2026
- Riders' champion: Archie McDonald
- Official website: www.motogp.com/en/bagger-worldcup

The FIM Harley-Davidson Bagger World Cup is a class of motorcycle racing featuring bagger-style motorcycles by Harley-Davidson modified for racing. The series is sanctioned by the FIM and supports MotoGP at selected European and North American rounds.

The series began with the 2026 racing season, following the MotoE World Championship being put on hiatus at the end of 2025. Many riders, who had previously competed in the MotoE series, moved to the Bagger World Cup for its inaugural season.

== History ==
The Bagger World Cup was revealed on 5 November 2025 at EICMA. Additional details were disclosed at a press conference at the Red Bull Ring on 6 February 2026. The series was inspired by King of the Baggers, an American-based championship that also has involvement of Indian Motorcycle. It was jointly developed by Harley-Davidson and MotoGP.

The first season was held alongside six MotoGP weekends in North America and Europe, with the inaugural round on 27–29 March at Circuit of the Americas. Archie McDonald won the first race, a seven-lap event.

== Technical specifications ==
The Bagger World Cup is a spec racing series utilizing motorcycles based on the Harley-Davidson Road Glide series production model, race-prepared by Harley-Davidson Factory Racing.

- Engine: 2152cc (131ci) Screamin' Eagle Milwaukee-Eight 131R V-twin
- Power: >200 horsepower
- Torque: >220 Nm
- Curb weight: approx. 280 kg
- Top speed: up to 310 km/h
- Gearbox: Screamin' Eagle Racing King 6 racing transmission with six-speed production gear ratios, quickshifter and blipper
- Wheels: Marchesini 17 inch 7-spoke forged aluminium rims
- Tires:
  - Front: 120/70 ZR17 - Dunlop Sportmax Slick (dry) or Dunlop KR189 (wet)
  - Rear: 200/60 ZR17 - Dunlop KR108 (dry) or Dunlop KR405 (wet)
- Suspension:
  - Front: Öhlins FGR 253 fully-adjustable pressurized racing fork
  - Rear: Twin Screamin' Eagle by Öhlins fully-adjustable nitrogen-charged racing shocks with external piggyback reservoirs
- Brakes:
  - Front: Brembo racing twin 330mm T-Drive front discs, nickel-plated billet Moto2 four-piston calipers, and Z04 racing pads
  - Rear: Brembo 300mm racing disc and calliper, foot and thumb brake actuation
- Exhaust: Akrapovič full titanium system

== List of Bagger World Cup champions ==
Season	Number of rounds	Number of races	Riders' champion	Teams' champion
2026	6	12	(Australia) Archie McDonald	not awarded

== Circuits ==
- (United States) Circuit of the Americas (2026–present)
- (Italy) Mugello Circuit (2026–present)
- (Netherlands) TT Circuit Assen (2026–present)
- (United Kingdom) Silverstone Circuit (2026)
- (Spain) MotorLand Aragón (2026–present)
- (Austria) Red Bull Ring (2026–present)
- (France) Bugatti Circuit (2027)
- (Spain) Circuit de Barcelona-Catalunya (2027)
- (Portugal) Algarve International Circuit (2027)
