= Barber Motorsports Park =

Motorsport venue in the United States

- Grand Prix Circuit (2003–present)
- Location: Birmingham, Alabama, USA
- Coordinates: 33°31′57″N 86°37′08″W
- Capacity: 90,000
- FIA Grade: 2
- Owner: Barber Motorsports
- Operator: ZOOM Motorsports
- Broke ground: 2002
- Opened: 2003
- Architect: Alan Wilson
- Major events: Current: IndyCar Series; Indy Grand Prix of Alabama (2010–2019, 2021–present); MotoAmerica (2015–2026); GT World Challenge America (2014–2016, 2024–present); FR Americas (2019–2020, 2025–present); Atlantic Championship (2021–2022, 2026); Former: Trans-Am Series (2025); IMSA Prototype Challenge (2017–2018); Rolex Sports Car Series; Porsche 250 (2003–2013); AMA Superbike Championship (2003–2014)
- Website: https://barberracingevents.com

Grand Prix Circuit (2003–present)
- Surface: Asphalt
- Length: 2.380 mi (3.830 km)
- Turns: 15
- Race lap record: 1:06.8182 ( (Mexico) Patricio O'Ward, Dallara IR-18, 2021, IndyCar)

Barber Motorsports Park is an 880-acre (360 ha) racing facility in Birmingham, Alabama. It was built by George W. Barber, and includes the 230,000-square-foot (21,000 m^{2}) Barber Vintage Motorsport Museum. It has been the site of the IndyCar Series' Grand Prix of Alabama since 2010. The Annual Barber Vintage Festival has taken place at the park each October since 2005. Barber Motorsports Park is also the home of the Porsche Track Experience.

== Track ==
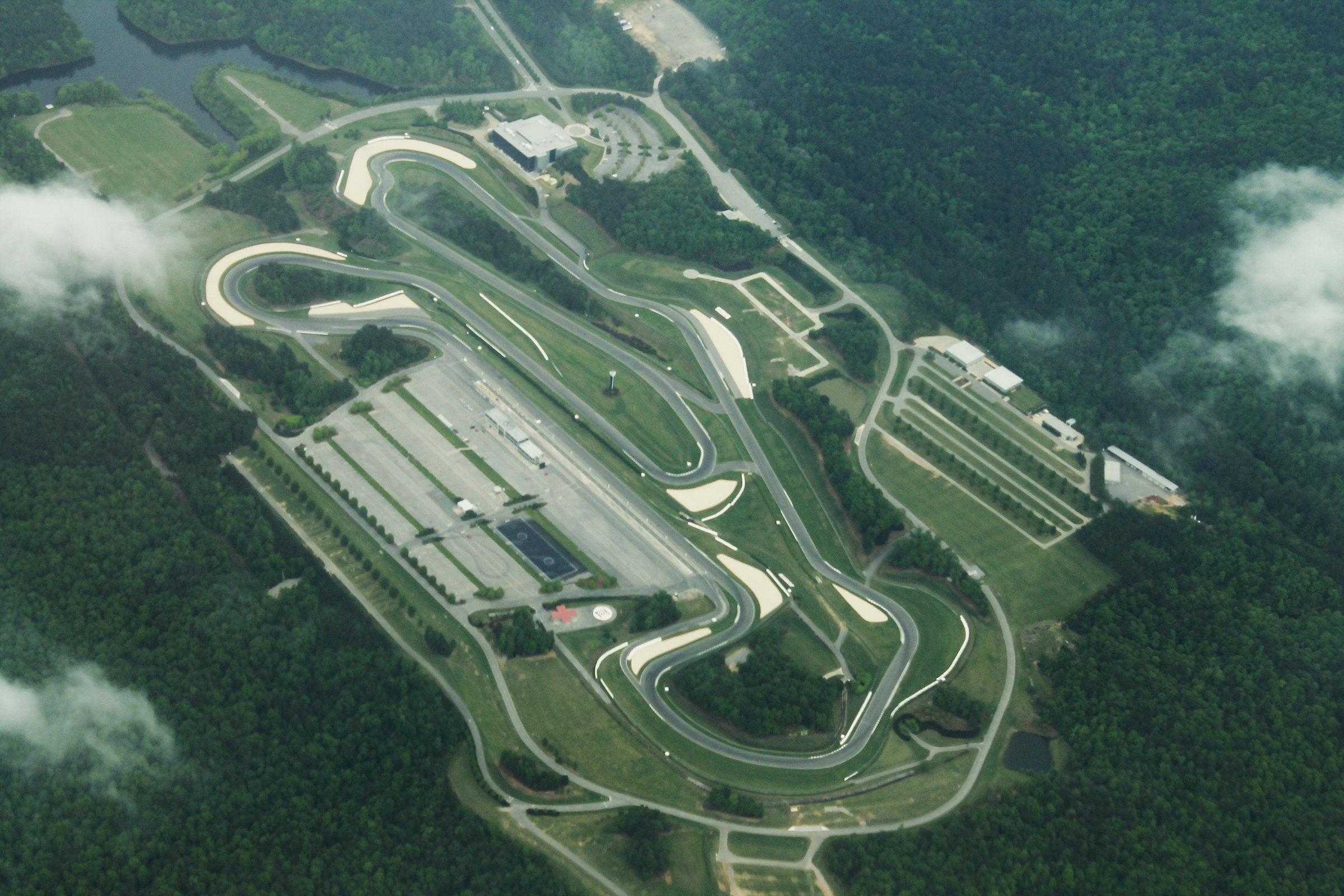
Aerial view of the circuit

The track has hosted numerous motorsport races including the IndyCar Series, Grand-Am, Vintage Racing Series events, American Historic Racing Motorcycle Association (AHRMA) racing, and MotoAmerica. It serves as the home of the Porsche Track Experience. It has hosted the Keith Code California Superbike School and the Yamaha Champions Riding School. Barber is noted for its landscaping and greenery; the track has been referred to as "The Augusta National of Motorsports".

The IndyCar Series had tests at Barber in 2007 and 2009.

The track had also been nominated by the FIA as the official test track for the now-closed down US F1 Team.

== Barber Proving Ground ==
The 14 acres (5.7 ha) Barber Proving Ground opened in 2014 to serve as an additional test facility for the Barber Museum. The track and adjacent 150-foot-by-350-foot wet/dry skid pad are used for a variety of purposes, including defensive driver training, safety instruction, product debuts, and vehicle testing.

Located on the hill overlooking the proving ground is a two-level, 9,800 sq ft (910 m^{2}) building that provides rental space for meetings, luncheons, product introductions, and seminars.

Two garage units totaling 16,800 sq ft (1,560 m^{2}) also stand in the vicinity of the Barber Proving Grounds. The garages support the Porsche Track Experience, Mercedes-Benz USA Brand Immersion Program, promoters' events, and other programs in the park.

== Vehicle off-road courses ==
Vintage Motocross: Barber Motorsports Park has a 0.7 mi (1.1 km) vintage motocross course. The inaugural event on the motocross took place during the 11th Annual Barber Vintage Festival with AHRMA presenting vintage motorcycle racing. Other uses of the motocross include product introductions by off-road vehicle manufacturers.

Vehicle Off-Road Course: The vehicle off-road course consists of approximately seven miles of trails confined to a 50 acres (20 ha) site adjoining the Barber Proving Ground. It can be configured into different layouts and is also multi-directional. The trails have varying terrain and provide moderate-to-extreme elevation conditions. Natural features such as water, rock, and bridge crossings have been incorporated into the trail system.

Obstacle Course: Consisting of unique obstacles for off-road vehicles and ATVs, the obstacle course is a natural trail consisting of a loop with nine features. These features are a railroad crossing, a concrete course with potholes, a 45-degree off-camber trail, a 15-degree concrete slope with three sets of rollers, a switchback, a 150 ft (46 m) "rock crawl", an articulation, a water crossing with adjustable water level, and 20 ft (6.1 m) of concrete stairs that are 10 ft (3.0 m) wide. There is an observation deck bordering the obstacle course for people to view the course below.

== Seasonal activities ==
Garden club park tours take place at Barber Motorsports Park year-round and utilize an open-air tram and tour guide. The tour starts off in front of the Barber Museum. The garden tours contain the park's plant collections, such as the 17 cloned Hightower Willow Oaks, which only exist in two places other than Barber Motorsports Park.

== Sculpture ==
The infield of the track has a number of large sculptures, including a series of large steel spiders and dragonflies created by artist Bill Secunda, a pair of lions, and a sisyphean figure pushing a track bridge support. The Turns 5 & 6 complex is referred to as Charlotte's Web because of the presence of a large spider sculpture prominently placed in the infield near the turn and because it is one of the track's prime passing opportunities.

Barber Motorsports Park features five large steel gates fabricated by Branko Medenica that bear motorsports and wildlife themes. A functional kinetic, wind-powered sculpture created by artist Edward Lee Hendricks is located nearby a pond along the track's perimeter road. Another art commission by Hendricks is located at the nearby Birmingham-Shuttlesworth International Airport. Standing in front of the Barber Museum are three stainless steel monuments by sculptor Theodore Gall, called The Chase. The Gall installation took over a year to create and collectively weighs close to five tons.

== Barber Vintage Motorsport Museum ==
Barber Vintage Motorsport Museum logo

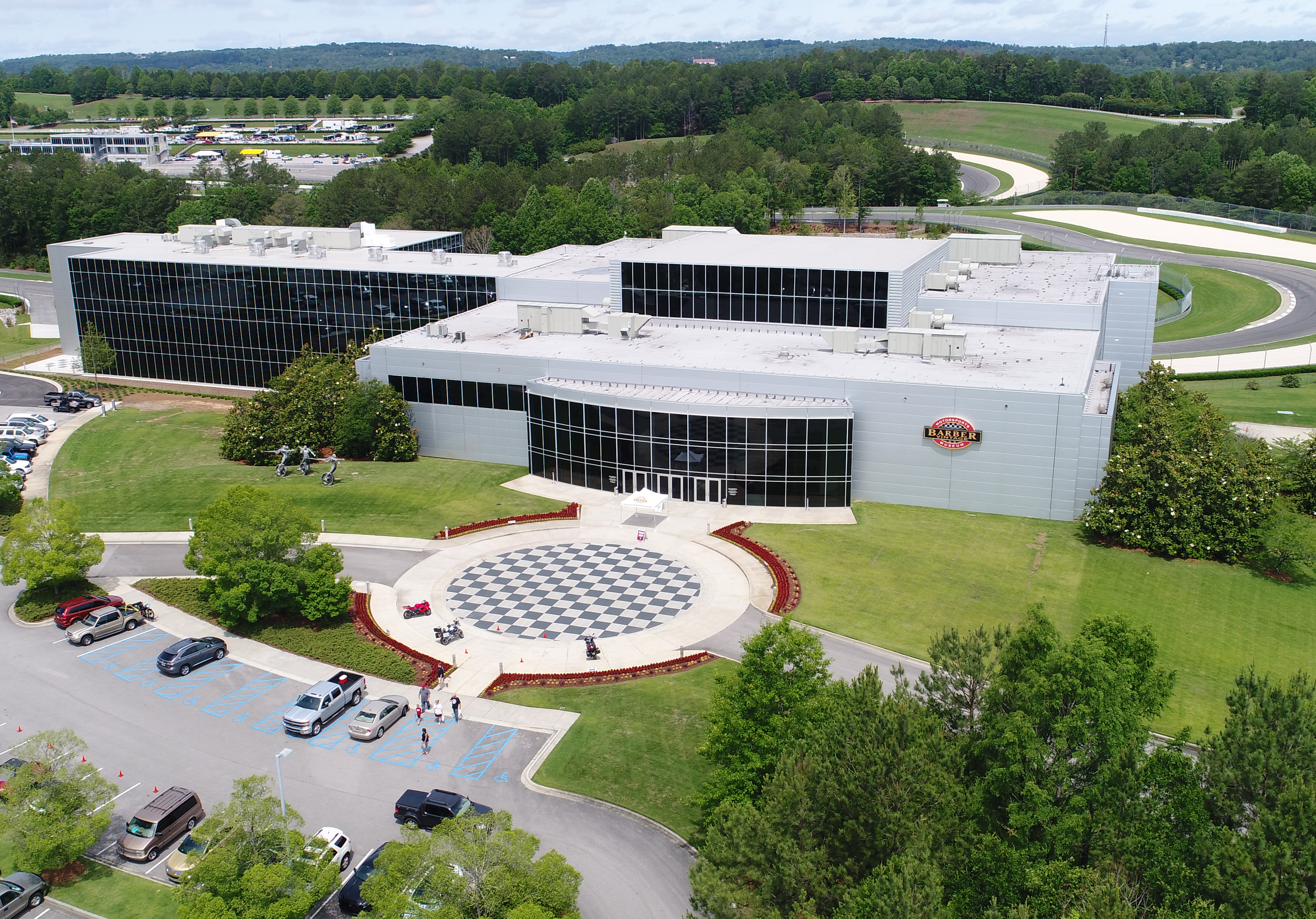
Barber Vintage Motorsports Museum

George Barber had a serious interest in vintage motorcycles and recognized that there was no museum that reflects the history of motorcycles around the world. He wanted to preserve motorcycle history in the United States in a way that represents an international aspect and to supply examples of motorcycles that until then could only have been seen in books and magazines.

The Barber Vintage Motorsports Museum began in 1988 as Barber's private collection. However, in 1994, he established the Barber Vintage Motorsports Museum as a 501(c)(3) nonprofit organization. It opened to the public in its original Southside Birmingham, Alabama location in 1995 (31 years ago). In 1997 the Barber Museum sent 21 motorcycles to New York's Guggenheim Museum for exhibit in The Art of the Motorcycle; the exhibit also traveled to Chicago and the Guggenheim Museum Bilbao. After the success of The Art of the Motorcycle, Barber set out to create a unique facility complete with a track. In designing the complex, Barber consulted with world champion racers John Surtees and Dan Gurney. In 2003, the Barber Museum was relocated to its permanent home in Barber Motorsports Park.

The museum contains more than 1,600 vintage and modern motorcycles and racing cars. It is considered the largest motorcycle museum in the world, as well as the largest collection of Lotus race cars. The motorcycle collection includes bikes dating from 1904 to present production. More than 900 motorcycles are on display. They come from 16 countries and represent over 140 different marques from as far away from the US as Australia, New Zealand, and Sweden.

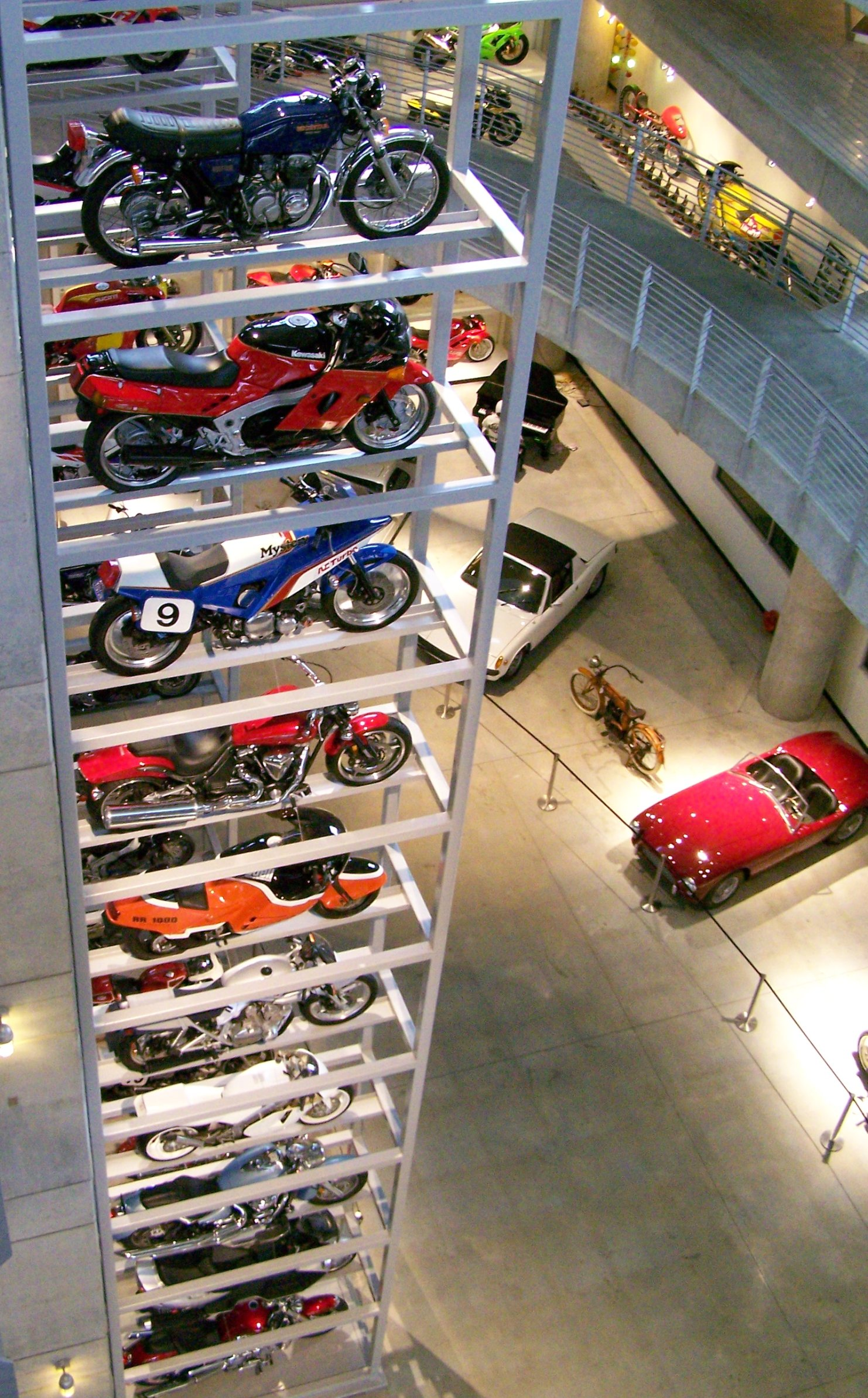
Motorcycle stack display in Barber Vintage Motorsports Museum

== Events ==
Current

- February: 24 Hours of Lemons
- March: IndyCar Series Indy Grand Prix of Alabama, Indy NXT, Porsche Sprint Challenge North America, Mustang Cup USA
- May: MotoAmerica MotoAmerica Superbikes at Barber
- July: National Auto Sport Association
- August: SCCA Super Tour
- September: GT World Challenge America, GT America Series, GT4 America Series, TC America Series, Toyota GR Cup North America
- October: Formula Regional Americas Championship Barber SpeedTour, Formula 4 United States Championship, Atlantic Championship Series, F2000 Championship Series, F1600 Championship Series, Sportscar Vintage Racing Association, Ligier Junior Formula Championship

Future

- IMSA VP Racing SportsCar Challenge (2027)
- McLaren Trophy America (2027)

Former

- AMA Pro Daytona Sportbike Championship (2009–2014)
- AMA Superbike Championship
  - Championship of Alabama (2003–2014)
- ChampCar Endurance Series (2015–2021)
- Formula BMW USA (2005)
- Grand-Am Cup (2003–2013)
- IMSA Prototype Challenge (2017–2018)
- Indy Pro 2000 Championship (2011–2012, 2014–2016, 2018, 2021–2022)
- Lamborghini Super Trofeo North America (2019)
- Mazda MX-5 Cup (2009, 2017–2018, 2025)
- North America Talent Cup (2022)
- Porsche GT3 Cup Challenge USA (2017–2019)
- Rolex Sports Car Series
  - Porsche 250 (2003–2013)
- Trans-Am Series (2025)
- USF Juniors (2022–2025)
- USF2000 Championship (2014–2017, 2021–2022)

== Lap records ==
As of September 2026, the fastest official race lap records on the Barber Motorsports Park are listed as:

Category	Time	Driver	Vehicle	Event
Grand Prix Circuit (2003–present): 2.380 mi (3.830 km)
IndyCar	1:06.8182	Patricio O'Ward	Dallara IR-18	2021 Honda Indy Grand Prix of Alabama
Indy NXT	1:12.0646	Alessandro de Tullio	Dallara IL-15	2026 Indy NXT by Firestone Grand Prix of Alabama
Indy Pro 2000	1:16.6098	Christian Rasmussen	Tatuus PM-18	2021 Indy Pro 2000 Grand Prix of Barber Motorsports Park
Formula Atlantic	1:18.095	Larry Howard	Swift 016.a	2022 Barber Atlantic Championship round
Formula Regional	1:18.916	Linus Lundqvist	Ligier JS F3	2020 Barber FR Americas round
DP	1:20.044	Brendon Hartley	Riley MkXXVI	2013 Porsche 250
GT3	1:21.410	Philip Ellis	Mercedes-AMG GT3 Evo	2025 Barber GT World Challenge America round
LMP3	1:21.484	Yann Clairay	Ligier JS P3	2018 Barber IMSA Prototype Challenge round
US F2000	1:21.5837	Nolan Siegel	Tatuus USF-17	2021 Cooper Tires USF2000 Grand Prix of Barber Motorsports Park
Superbike	1:22.463	Jake Gagne	Yamaha YZF-R1	2023 Barber MotoAmerica round
Mazda Prototype Challenge	1:22.754	Kyle Masson	Élan DP02	2017 Barber IMSA Prototype Challenge round
Porsche Carrera Cup	1:23.775	Riley Dickinson	Porsche 911 (992 I) GT3 Cup	2023 Barber Porsche Sprint Challenge North America round
Stock 1000	1:24.334	Hayden Gillim	Suzuki GSX-R1000	2024 Barber MotoAmerica round
Lamborghini Super Trofeo	1:24.798	Richard Antinucci	Lamborghini Huracán Super Trofeo Evo	2019 Barber Lamborghini Super Trofeo North America round
F2000 Championship	1:25.197	Ayrton Houlk	Van Diemen DP08	2022 Barber F2000 Championship round
Formula 4	1:25.579	Alex Popow Jr.	Ligier JS F422	2025 Barber F4 United States round
USF Juniors	1:25.7635	Leonardo Escorpioni	Tatuus JR-23	2025 Children’s of Alabama Grand Prix
Supersport	1:26.029	Josh Herrin	Ducati Panigale V2	2026 Barber MotoAmerica round
TA1	1:26.743	Adam Andretti	Chevrolet Camaro Trans-Am	2025 Barber Trans-Am round
TA2	1:26.850	Tristan McKee	Chevrolet Camaro Trans-Am	2025 Barber Trans-Am round
Grand-Am GT	1:27.275	Bill Auberlen	BMW M3 (E92) GT	2013 Porsche 250
GT	1:27.857	Bill Auberlen	BMW M3 (E46) GT	2004 Porsche 250
Formula BMW	1:28.224	Edoardo Piscopo	Mygale FB02	2005 Barber Formula BMW USA round
GT4	1:28.887	Parker Delong	McLaren Artura GT4	2026 Barber GT4 America round
Twins Cup	1:28.915	Hank Vossberg	Aprilia RS660	2026 Barber MotoAmerica round
F1600 Championship	1:30.670	Hugh Esterson	Mygale SJ13 F1600	2022 Barber F1600 Championship round
Grand-Am GX	1:31.630	Tom Long	Mazda6 GX	2013 Porsche 250
Mustang Challenge	1:32.987	Logan Adams	Ford Mustang Dark Horse R	2026 Barber Mustang Cup USA round
SGS	1:33.633	Randy Pobst	Porsche 911 (996) GT3 Cup	2004 Porsche 250
Toyota GR Cup	1:37.304	Jeremy Fletcher	Toyota GR86	2025 Barber Toyota GR Cup North America round
Mazda MX-5 Cup	1:37.543	Westin Workman	Mazda MX-5 (ND)	2025 Barber Mazda MX-5 Cup round
250cc	1:39.628	Chris Clark	Aprilia RS250SP2	2022 Barber North America Talent Cup round
