= Circuit of the Americas =

Motor race track near Austin, Texas, U.S.

COTA
- Circuit of the Americas

- Grand Prix Circuit (2012–present)

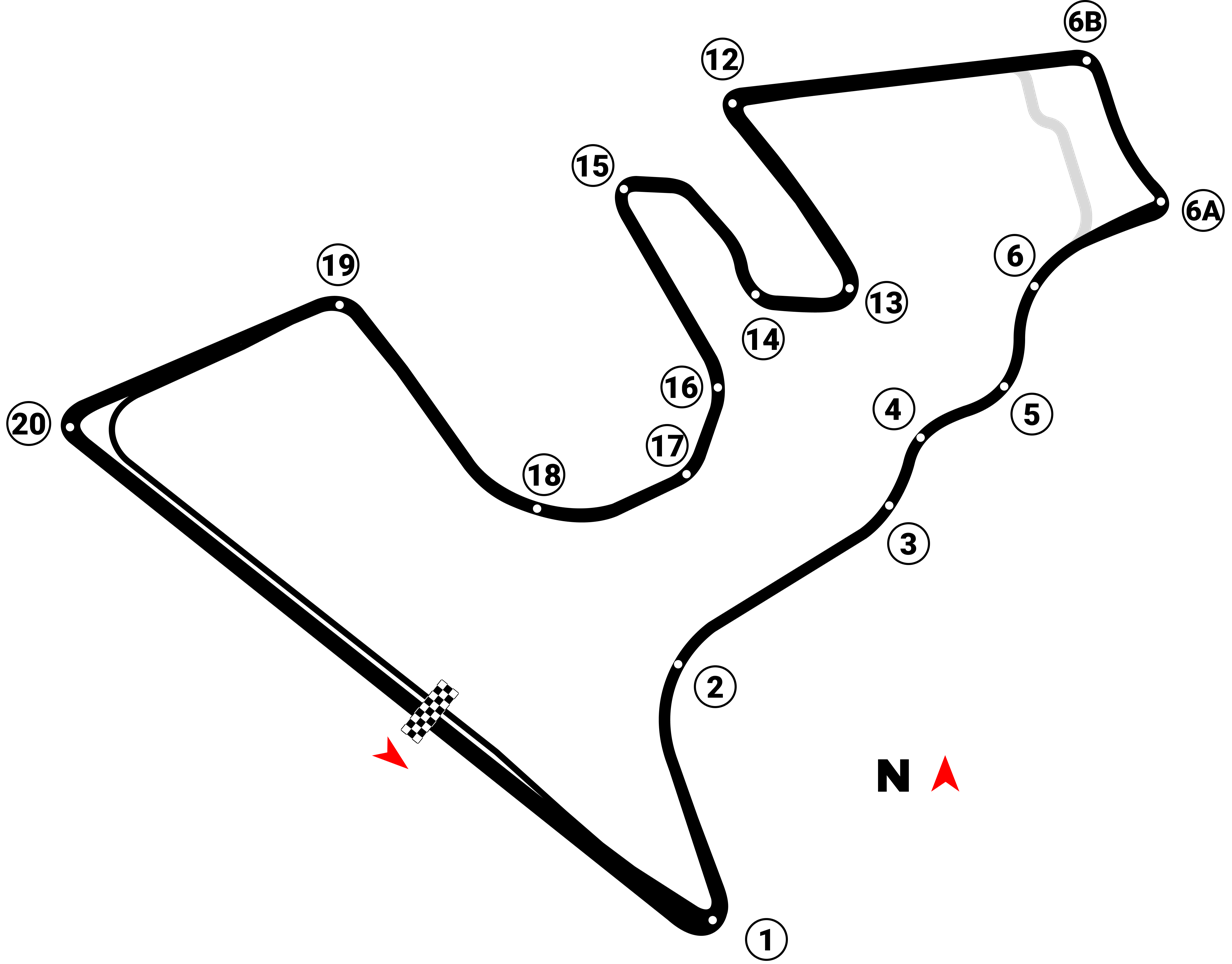
- NASCAR Circuit (2025–present)
- Location: Austin, Texas, United States
- Coordinates: 30°7′58″N 97°38′28″W
- Capacity: 120,000
- FIA Grade: 1
- Owner: Circuit of the Americas LLC (2012–present)
- Broke ground: December 31, 2010; 15 years ago
- Opened: October 21, 2012; 14 years ago
- Architect: Tavo Hellmund, Kevin Schwantz, and Hermann Tilke
- Major events: Current: Formula One; United States Grand Prix (2012–2019, 2021–present); Grand Prix motorcycle racing; United States motorcycle Grand Prix (2026); Motorcycle Grand Prix of the Americas (2013–2019, 2021–2025); FIA World Endurance Championship; Lone Star Le Mans (2013–2017, 2020, 2024–present); NASCAR Cup Series; DuraMAX Texas Grand Prix (2021–present); NASCAR O'Reilly Auto Parts Series; Focused Health 250 (2021–present); GT World Challenge America; GT World Challenge America at COTA (2013, 2015–2021, 2023–present); Trans-Am Series; Racing America @ COTA (2015–2026); MotoAmerica; Superbikes at Texas (2015–2019, 2022–2026); Future: Formula E; Austin ePrix (2027); Intercontinental GT Challenge; Texas 8 Hour (2027); Former: NASCAR Craftsman Truck Series; XPEL 225 (2021–2024); IndyCar Series; IndyCar Classic (2019); IMSA SportsCar Championship; Advance Auto Parts Sportscar Showdown (2014–2017)
- Website: http://circuitoftheamericas.com

Grand Prix Circuit (2012–present)
- Length: 3.426 mi (5.513 km)
- Turns: 20
- Race lap record: 1:36.169 ( (Monaco) Charles Leclerc, Ferrari SF90, 2019, F1)

NASCAR Circuit (2025–present)
- Length: 2.400 mi (3.862 km)
- Turns: 17
- Race lap record: 1:29.216 ( (United States) Wyatt Brichacek, Ligier JS P325, 2026, LMP3)

National Circuit (2012–present)
- Length: 2.300 mi (3.702 km)
- Turns: 19
- Race lap record: 1:33.284 ( (United States) Johnny O'Connell, Cadillac CTS-V, 2013, PWC GT)

The Circuit of the Americas (COTA) is a Grade 1 FIA-specification 3.426 mi (5.514 km) motor racing track and facilities located in Austin, Texas, United States. The facility is home to the Formula One United States Grand Prix, NASCAR, the MotoGP Motorcycle Grand Prix of the Americas, and the FIA World Endurance Championship with the Lone Star Le Mans. It previously hosted the Australian V8 Supercars, the Americas Rallycross Championship, the American Le Mans Series, the Rolex Sports Car Series, the IMSA SportsCar Championship and the IndyCar Classic.

The circuit and Grand Prix were first proposed in the middle of 2010. The circuit was the first in the United States to be purpose-built for Formula One. The layout was conceived by promoter Tavo Hellmund and 1993 Motorcycle World Champion Kevin Schwantz with the assistance of German architect and circuit designer Hermann Tilke, who has also designed the Sepang, Shanghai, Yas Marina, Istanbul, Bahrain, Yeongam, and Buddh circuits, as well as the reprofiling of the Hockenheimring and Fuji Speedway.

== History ==
=== Construction ===
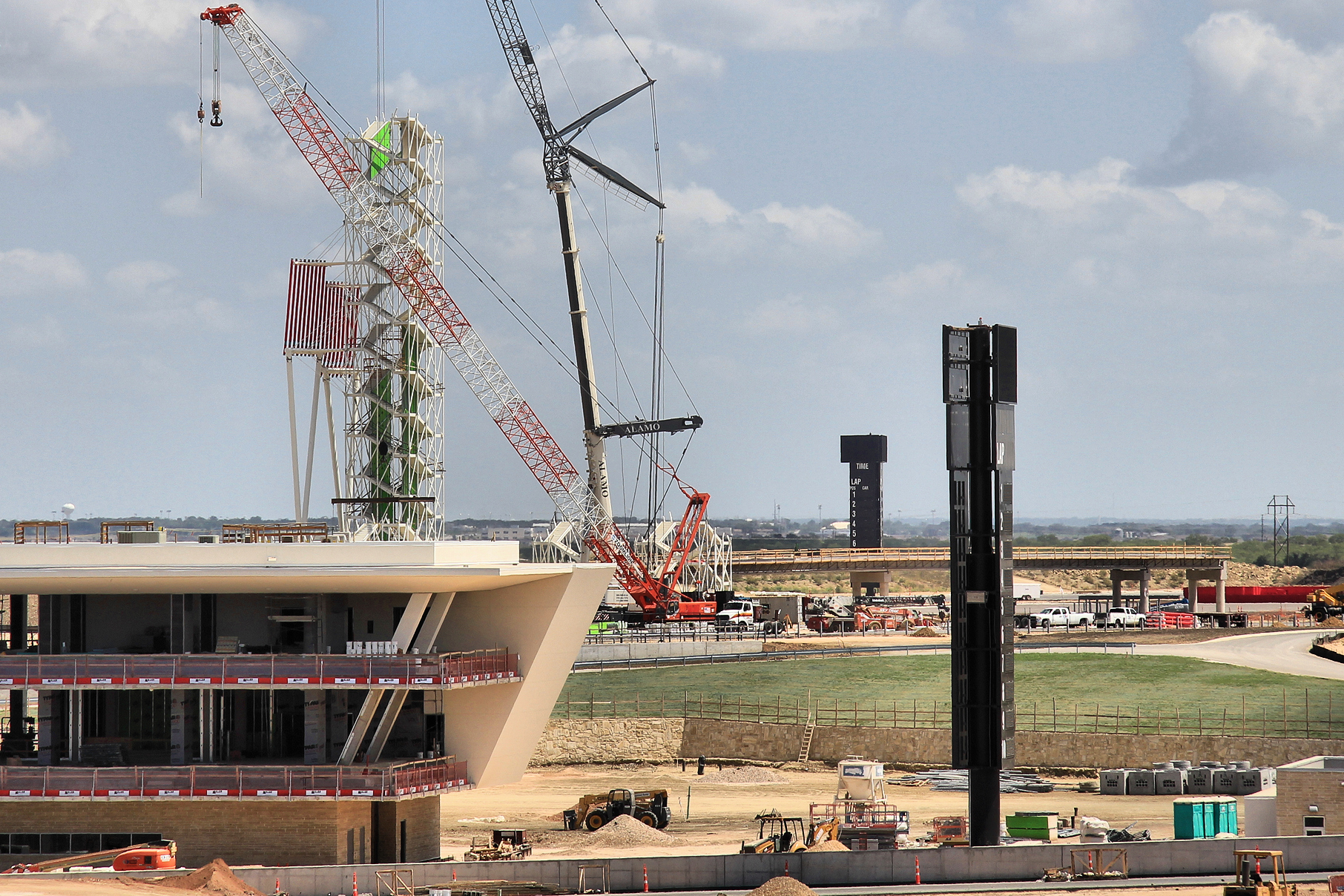
The 251 ft (77 m) observation tower under construction at the Circuit of the Americas

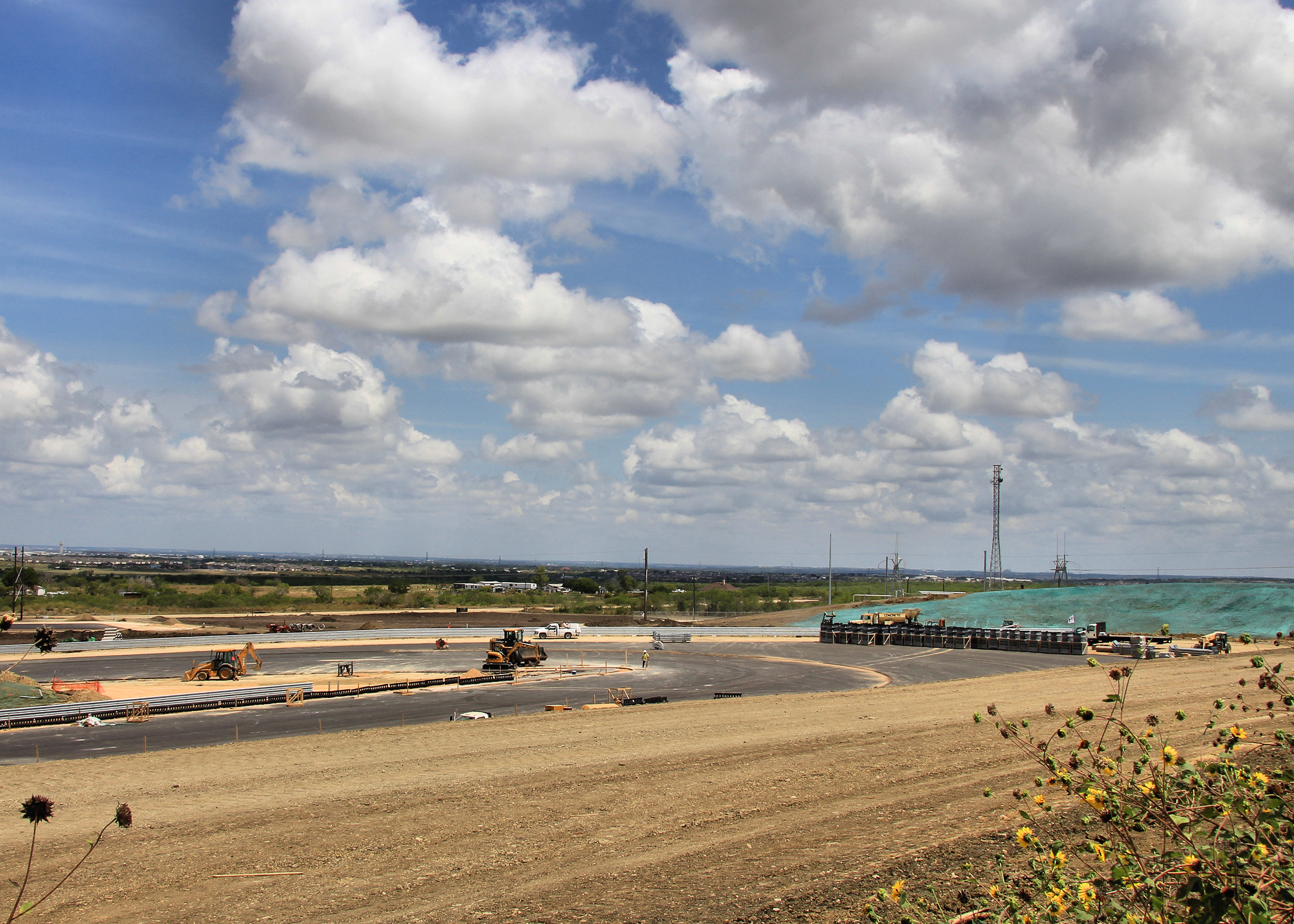
Hairpin Turn 11 before completion

In a news conference on July 27, 2010, Tavo Hellmund announced plans to build the track on about 890 acres (3.6 km^{2}) of undeveloped land in southeastern Travis County. The majority of the site had been planned to be developed into a residential subdivision called "Wandering Creek". In the same news conference, Hellmund also revealed that Texas billionaire Red McCombs was the project's largest investor. The circuit homologation design was submitted to the FIA in Geneva for approval on December 17, 2010. HKS, Inc. and Tilke Engineers & Architects designed the track, and Austin Commercial, a subsidiary of Austin Industries, was the general contractor. The Grand Plaza, Observation Structure, Tower Amphitheater, and Main Grandstand were designed by Austin-based architectural firm Miró Rivera Architects.

Construction began on December 31, 2010, and was due to be complete by June 2012. Following a stop-work order in December 2011, the completion date was revised to August. The first tasks were building the silt fences, taking core samples, and shredding existing vegetation.

On January 21, 2011, a $900,000 check was posted with Travis County that permitted grading to begin. The money was to be used to restore the land if the U.S. Federal Emergency Management Agency (FEMA) declined to allow the project to move forward because part of the site lies in a floodplain. FEMA issued a letter on June 28, 2011, stating the project meets its floodplain management criteria.

In January 2012, Travis County announced that Elroy Road—one of the two primary public access roads to the circuit—would receive an upgrade to handle the increased volume of incoming traffic, but not before the running of the 2012 race. At the time of the announcement, the unstable clay soils under the road surface had caused Elroy Road to gradually buckle and shift, necessitating the upgrade.

On June 13, 2012, Charlie Whiting—the FIA-appointed Race Director for Formula 1—declared himself satisfied with the circuit's construction, scheduling a final pre-race inspection of the circuit for September 25, sixty days before the first race, which the circuit later passed. To ensure the demanding FIA specifications for the track were met, GPS-based 3D paving equipment was used on the asphalt paving and milling machines. The first layer of asphalt was completed on August 3, 2012. Construction began laying the final layer of asphalt on August 14, and was finished on September 21. The track was officially opened on October 21, with Mario Andretti running the ceremonial first laps in a Lotus 79, the car he drove when he became the last American to win the World Drivers' Championship in 1978.

=== Name ===
McCombs wished to call the site "Speed City", but the owners originally anticipated selling the naming rights to various parts of the facility for $7 million. On April 12, 2011, the track's name was announced as "Circuit of the Americas" at a press conference. Red McCombs, later said: "One of the most inviting aspects of the name is the word 'Americas'. It reflects Austin's ideal location at the crossroads of North America from north to south, east to west. Also, it speaks to our state as a centre of commerce and cultural exchange in this hemisphere. I look forward to meeting many fans and visitors who will be coming from every country." In December 2020 Red McCombs got a corner named after him called 'Big Red'.

=== City endorsement and lawsuit ===
In order for the race to take place, the Austin city council was asked to be the sponsoring municipality for the event. Through being a sponsor, the city could apply for money from a state fund, the Major Events Trust Fund (METF), designed to attract major sporting events to Texas that would be used to pay the Formula One race sanctioning fee. This matter was complicated by opponents of the project who filed a lawsuit against state comptroller Susan Combs, claiming that she had promised the funding to the circuit without having been legally authorized to do so, though promoters have responded stating that all necessary guidelines had been followed.

On June 29, 2011, Austin City Council voted 5–2 to approve arrangements supporting an application to the Texas Major Events Trust Fund. The financial arrangements were intended to ensure that race organizers, rather than the city, provided the required local funding contribution. The council also adopted environmental conditions for the project.

On July 1, 2011, a state district court judge declined to enter a temporary restraining order against Combs preventing payments from the METF; nonetheless, Texas Comptroller Combs reconsidered and chose not to make the July 31 advance payment to FOMC/Bernard Ecclestone as previously agreed for the first year's sanctioning fee. The lawsuit was dropped after the race was delayed a year.

=== Breach of contract and reinstatement ===
In November 2011, Bernie Ecclestone expressed what he called "minor" doubt over the future of the United States Grand Prix in Austin after "disagreements inside the [management] company". These issues were later confirmed when construction of the circuit came to a halt because of a dispute between the circuit owners, promoter Full Throttle Productions, and Formula One Management.

Promoter Tavo Hellmund admitted that his company had been in breach of its contract with Formula One Management since May 2011. The situation further escalated when state comptroller Susan Combs described the planned Grand Prix of America as a threat to the race in Texas, and said that the first $25 million payment from the state sports fund would only be made available after the first Grand Prix at the circuit, despite having previously promised to make the funds available in time for the inaugural event. Bernie Ecclestone later issued an ultimatum to the owners and organizers: find a solution before the December 7 meeting of the FIA World Motor Sport Council or else risk being removed from the 2012 calendar. Ecclestone emphasized that if the Circuit of the Americas were removed from the calendar, it would not be added again at a later date.

On December 7, 2011, the World Motor Sport Council released the final calendar for the 2012 season, with the Circuit of the Americas retaining its November 18 date. Further details revealed that the race investors, McCombs and Epstein, had reached a new arrangement with Ecclestone, with work on the circuit scheduled to resume immediately. As a part of the arrangement, organizers paid the sanctioning fee for the 2012 race one year in advance as a show of good faith. At the time of the circuit's reinstatement, there were no reports supporting Tavo Hellmund's continued involvement under the new contract.

In March 2012, Tavo Hellmund and Full Throttle Productions filed a lawsuit concerning the project’s ownership and management against Bobby Epstein and other individuals and companies, including McCombs Motor Sports LLC. The parties reached an out-of-court settlement in June 2012. The settlement terms were not disclosed.

=== Formula One attendance records ===
A crowd of 117,429 spectators watched the United States Grand Prix in November 2012 after four years of Formula One not hosting a Grand Prix in the United States. In October 2022, the three-day Formula One United States Grand Prix event drew a record number of fans. Roughly 440,000 people attended the event, breaking Formula One's attendance record of 400,000 set at the 2021 United States Grand Prix for an event held in North America. Sunday's race final drew over 150,000 spectators to the Circuit of the Americas breaking the inaugural Formula One race at the circuit attendance in 2012. This surge was due to the popularity of Formula 1: Drive to Survive in the United States and the honoring of the 2020 tickets as the 2020 United States Grand Prix was cancelled due to the COVID-19 pandemic.

=== Dispute over planned MotoGP race ===
In April 2011, plans were unveiled by Tavo Hellmund of Full Throttle Productions and Kevin Schwantz of 3fourTexas for the circuit to host a round of the 2013 MotoGP World Championship, with the race to be known as the Texas Grand Prix. The race was the brainchild of Schwantz, the circuit co-designer, who would serve as event promoter with his company, 3fourTexas. However, following the settlement of the lawsuit between Tavo Hellmund and Bobby Epstein, Schwantz announced that he would be suing Steve Sexton. Schwantz claimed that upon the resolution of the dispute between Hellmund and Epstein, Sexton moved to negotiate directly with MotoGP's commercial rights holder, Dorna Sports, ignoring what he claimed was an existing contract between Dorna and 3fourTexas to hold the race.

Circuit representatives denied that there was ever a contract between Schwantz and the Circuit of the Americas, and that his dispute was with Dorna Sports. Dorna later claimed that although a contract for the race between Dorna and Schwantz had existed, the contract had been terminated in July 2012 as they believed Schwantz had failed to acquire the necessary rights from the circuit to hold the race. Schwantz then accused Sexton and the Circuit of the Americas of "undermining" him, deliberately blocking his attempts to establish a race in order to have the contract terminated and allowing them to negotiate a more-favourable arrangement with Dorna.

In October 2012, Dorna Sports announced that they had come to agreeable terms with organizers of the Texas motorcycle Grand Prix, including the race on the 2013 calendar as the Motorcycle Grand Prix of the Americas, but made no mention of the dispute with Schwantz or any outcome of it. Prior to the 2014 Motorcycle Grand Prix of the Americas, the circuit announced that COTA and Schwantz had amicably settled their legal differences and reached an agreement to collaborate to promote motorcycling racing, with Schwantz taking the role as official ambassador for COTA.

=== IndyCar Series ===
On September 4, 2018, IndyCar announced that it has reached a multi-year agreement to add the Circuit of the Americas to its calendar replacing Phoenix Raceway (then known as ISM Raceway), finalizing the IndyCar Series calendar. After hosting an IndyCar Spring Training test session, on February 12–13, COTA made its debut on the IndyCar Series schedule on Sunday, March 24, serving as the second race of the 2019 campaign, with the AutoNation IndyCar Challenge (IndyCar Classic), following the March 10 season-opener at St. Petersburg, FL. It was the first time since 2014 that two tracks in Texas would appear on the IndyCar Series calendar.

On February 11, 2020, the opening day of IndyCar Spring Training, cold temperatures and persistent showers severely limited track time for all competitors to slow installation laps and a few experimental runs on rain tires. With improved weather, on February 12, IndyCar concluded its first open test of the season. However, the 2020 race was cancelled due to the COVID-19 pandemic. On October 1, 2020, Indycar released the 2021 calendar with COTA dropped from the schedule unexpectedly to the surprise of many, after it was announced two years prior that they had a multi-year deal in place between Indycar and COTA.

=== NASCAR ===
On September 30, 2020, it was announced that COTA would host a NASCAR Cup Series event for the first time on May 23, 2021. The lower O'Reilly Auto Parts Series and Craftsman Truck Series were also added as support events. On December 11, 2020, it was announced that NASCAR would run the full 3.426 mi (5.514 km) course. EchoPark Automotive assumed naming rights for the Cup race, which dubbed it the EchoPark Texas Grand Prix. The Xfinity and Truck races were respectively named the Pit Boss 250 and Toyota Tundra 225 with title sponsorship from Pit Boss Grills and Toyota.

The inaugural race weekend was marred by rain, with the Truck race on Saturday being in wet conditions while the O'Reilly Auto Parts Series event later in the day was drier. The Cup race the following day, won by Chase Elliott, was shortened as the weather worsened and caused low driver visibility. On September 15, The Athletic has reported that NASCAR will return to the circuit for the 2022 season as Speedway Motorsports, the promoter of the race picked up the renewal on the contract. The race ran as scheduled on March 27, 2022. The promoters announced on the week prior to the race that NASCAR will be returning to Austin as they renewed for one more year. It will mark the third time consecutively that NASCAR goes to Austin.

On November 20, 2024, it was announced that both the Cup and O'Reilly Auto Parts Series races would move to the 2.400 mi (3.862 km) layout starting in 2025.

As of 2025, the Circuit of the Americas is the third-longest road course in the NASCAR Cup series.

=== Commercial agreements ===
On October 19, 2025, Formula One announced an agreement extending the United States Grand Prix at Circuit of the Americas through the 2034 season.

In August 2026, the circuit announced a financing partnership with Carlyle’s Global Credit business to support COTALAND and additional developments, including a planned water park and resort. The companies stated that the arrangement would not change the circuit’s ownership structure.

== Facilities ==
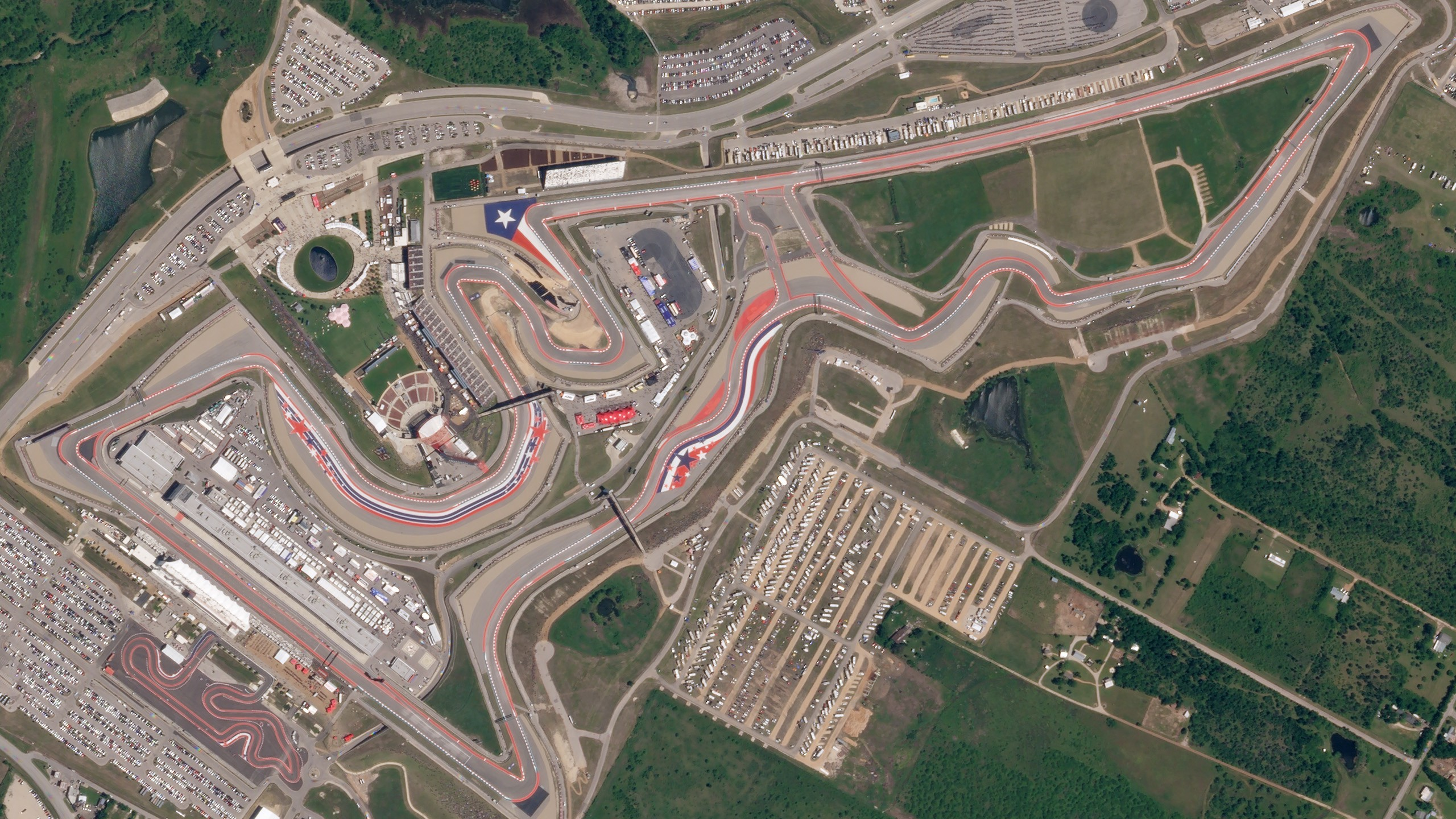
The Circuit of the Americas facilities in 2018

=== Racetrack ===
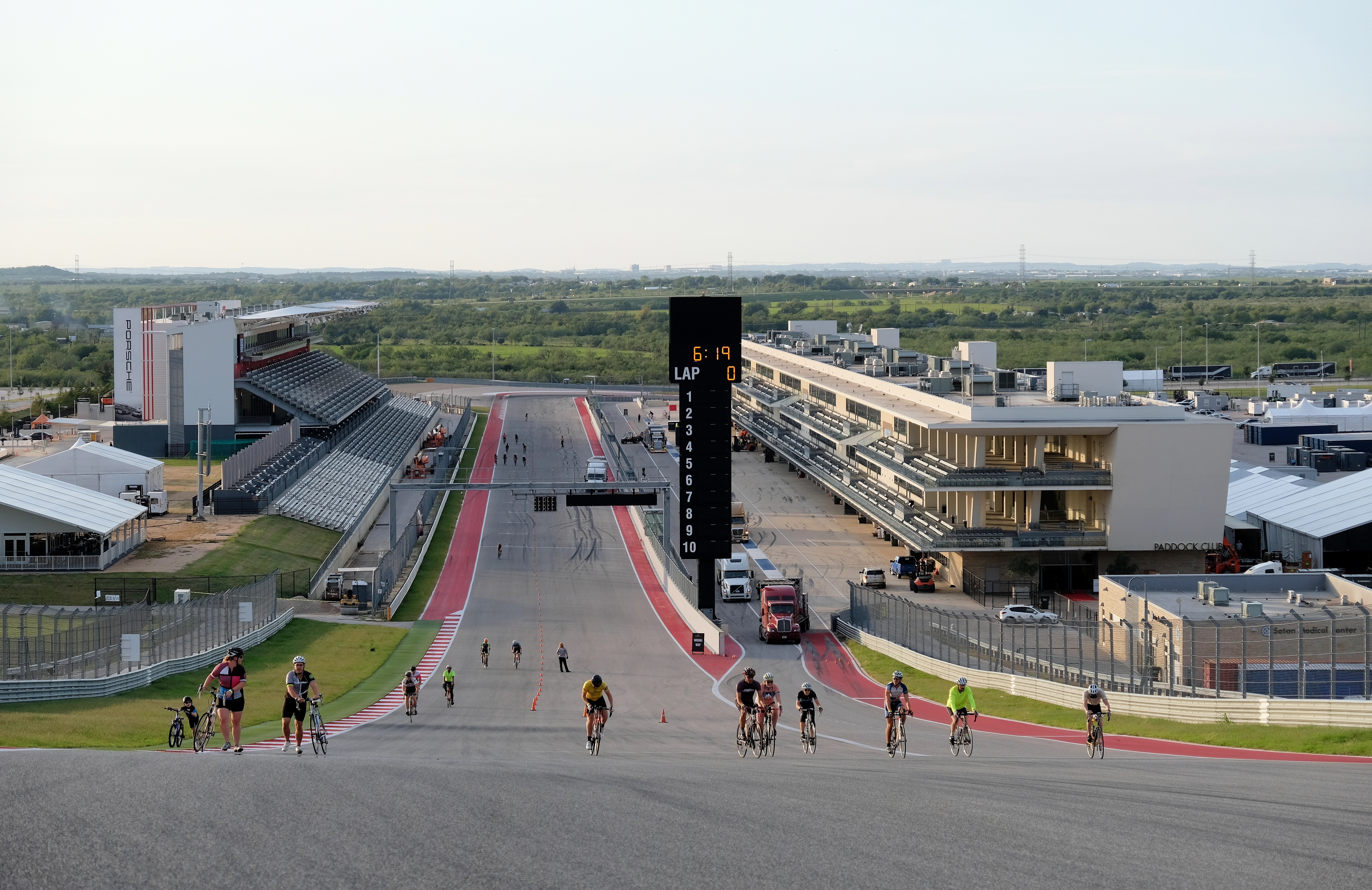
Main straight and turn 1 hill

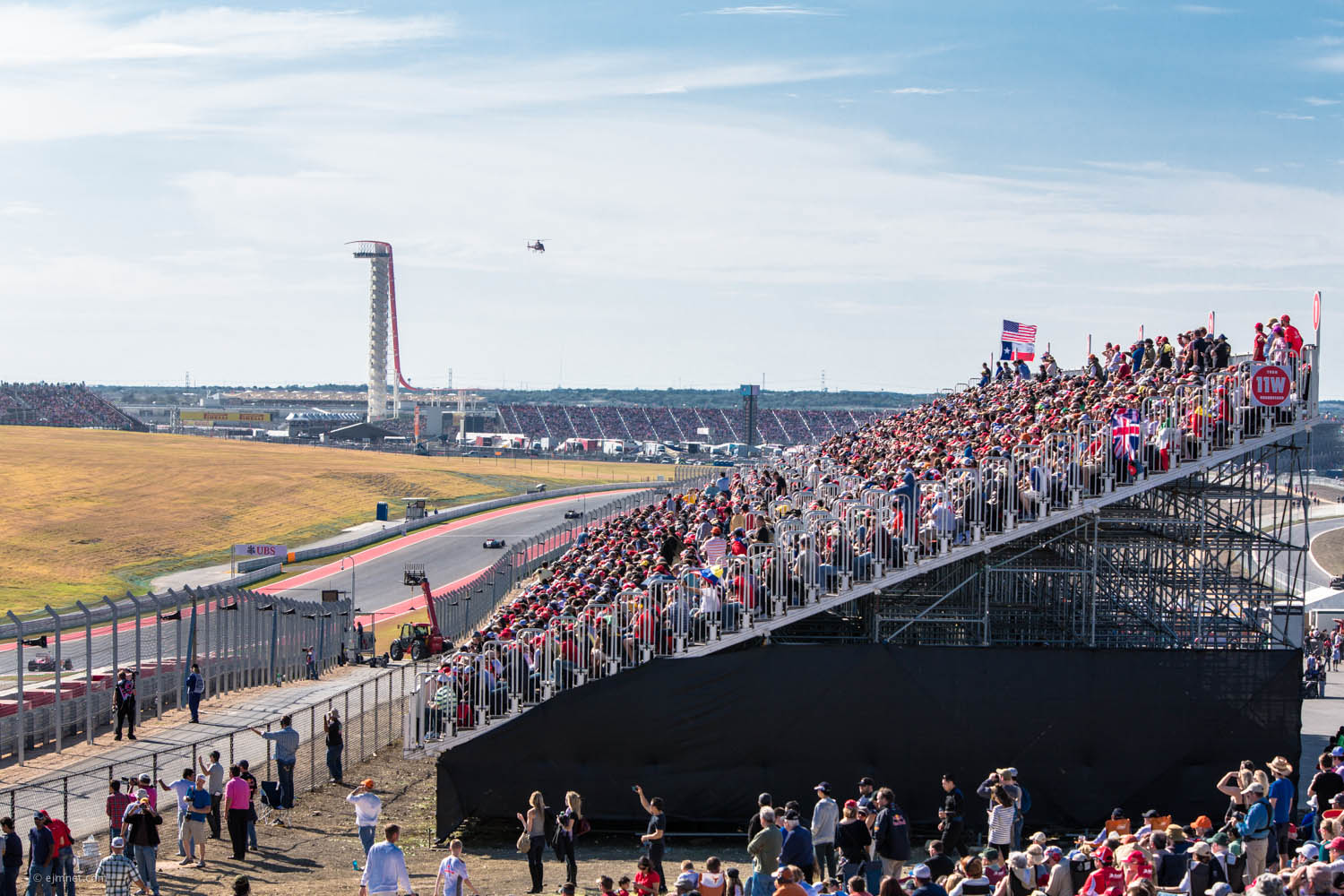
Crowd at COTA on race day

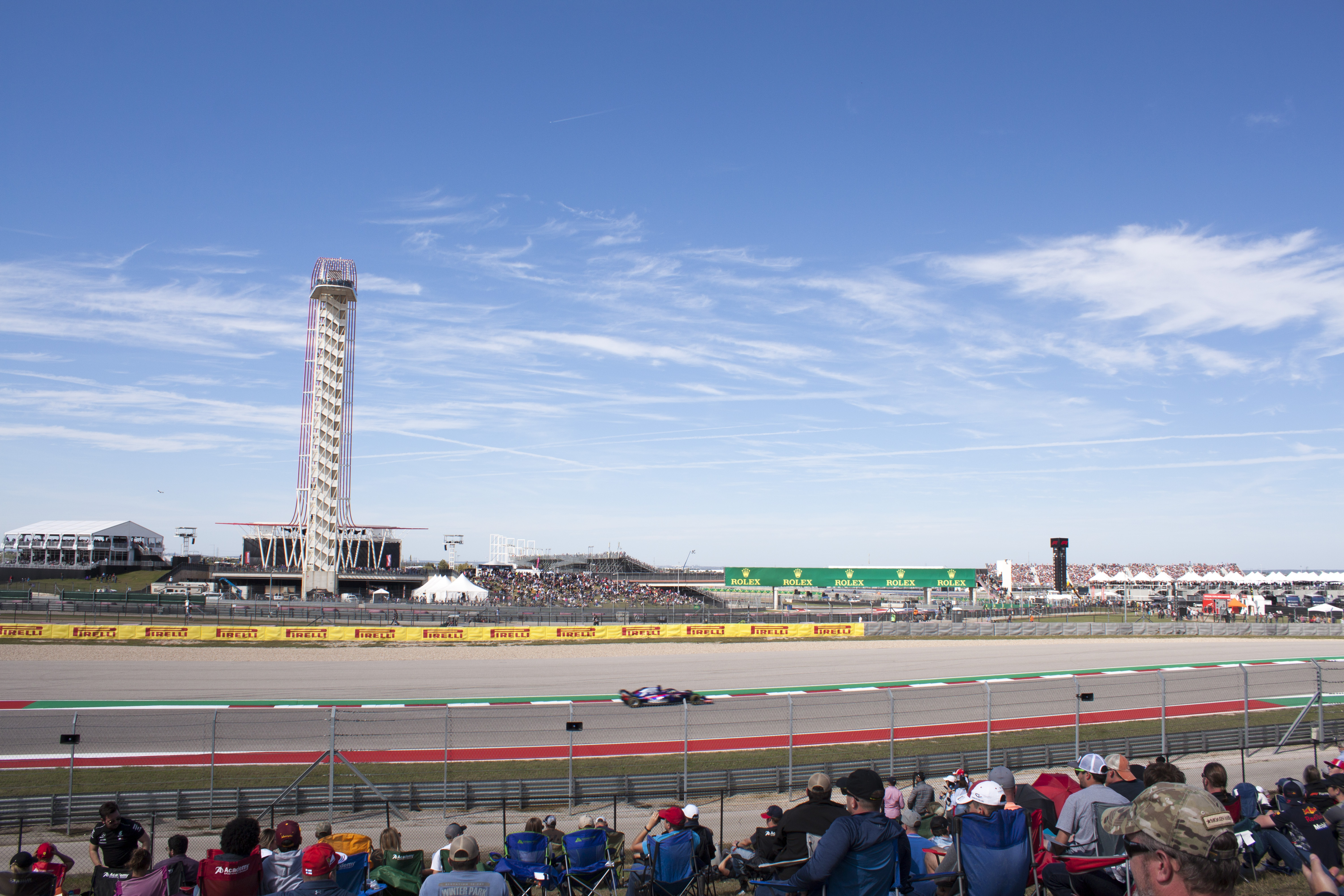
The Circuit of the Americas during the 2018 US Grand Prix

In an episode of Speed TV's Wind Tunnel program broadcast on August 22, 2010, Tavo Hellmund revealed that the circuit would be 3.426 mi (5.514 km) long and would be made up of twenty turns with an elevation change of 133 ft (41 m). The final plan of the circuit was released on September 1, 2010, showing a design inspired by the European tradition of sculpting the circuit to the contours of the land. The design draws from several European Formula One circuits, including a recreation of Silverstone's Maggotts–Becketts–Chapel sequence, Hockenheim's arena bends, and a replica of Istanbul's Turn Eight. Other corners were loosely inspired by the Senna 'S' at Interlagos, Turn 4 at the Buddh International Circuit and Turns 9-10 at Bahrain, the latter two tracks also designed by Tilke. A feature of the circuit is a deliberate widening of corners, to encourage drivers to follow multiple racing lines. A similar feature was used at the Buddh International Circuit in India, where the circuit widens on the approach to certain corners.

The circuit was one of only a handful on the Formula One 2012 calendar to be run counter-clockwise, the others being Marina Bay, the Yeongam, Yas Marina, and Interlagos. Because of this, the circuit contains more left-hand turns than right-hand ones, placing greater physical demands on the drivers whose bodies, particularly their necks, are more adapted to the lateral g-forces of clockwise circuits.

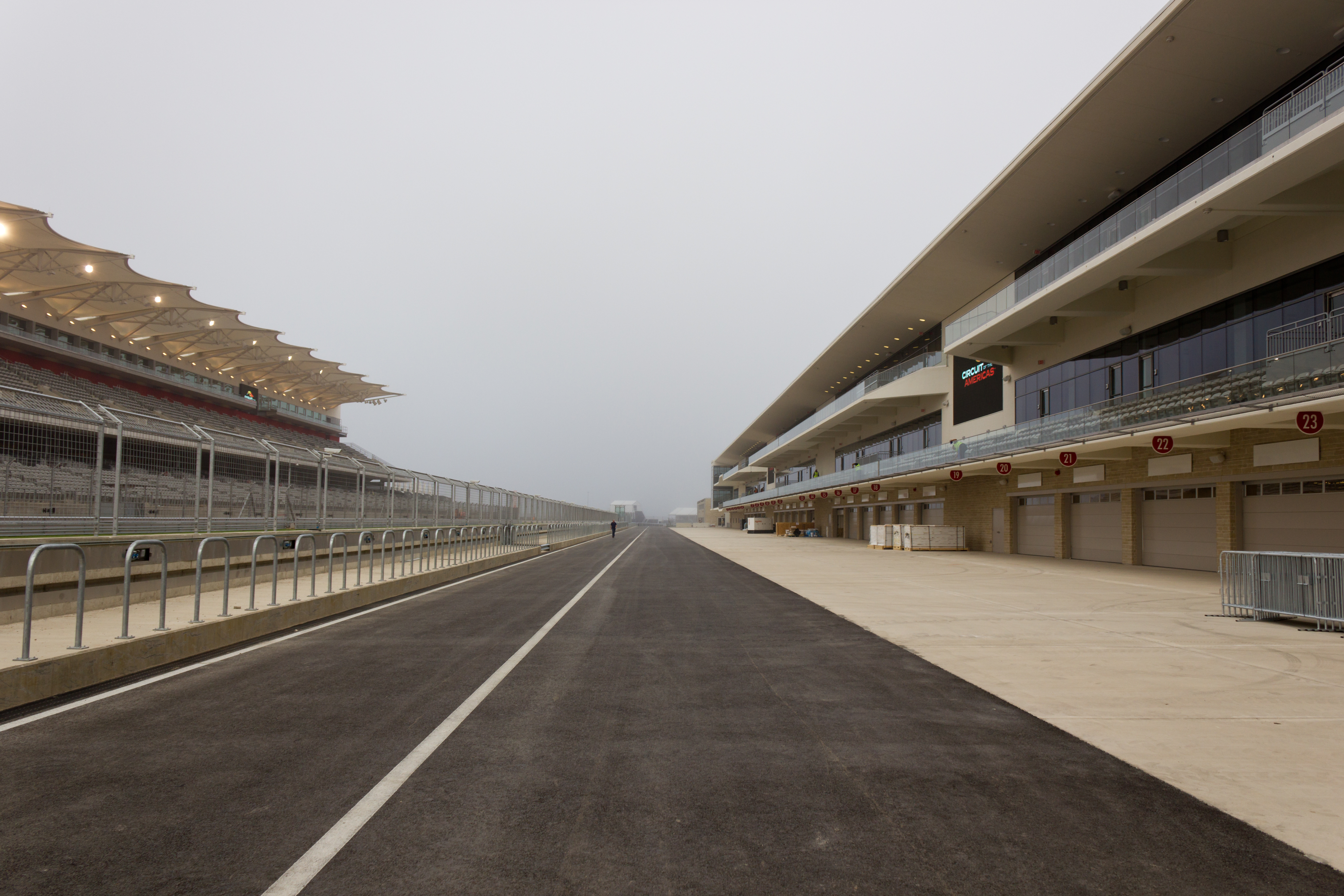
Pit lane

From the start line, the drivers climb a gradient of over 11% to the first corner called Big Red—the highest point of the circuit—with the apex of the corner positioned on the crest of the hill, similar to Turn 4 of Buddh. They then take a downhill right-hander inspired by the Senna 'S' of Interlagos before climbing back up the side of the hill to navigate a series of fast sweepers modeled on Silverstone's Maggotts–Becketts–Chapel complex, which is turns 3-6 at COTA. These sweepers tighten through turns 7-9, while continuing the esses, but slowing the cars down substantially, requiring drivers to downshift to 4th gear and through a blind corner at Turn 10. This corner takes them to the far end of the circuit and a hairpin at Turn 11 where the drivers then follow a 0.62 mi (1.00 km) straight back towards the pit and paddock area. This straight leads to the final sector of the lap with a heavy braking zone and a sequence of corners inspired by the arena bends of Hockenheim, to Turns 9 and 10 of Bahrain, a corner that significantly tightens in the second part, requiring drivers to brake and turn at the same time. This is followed by a downhill, multi-apex corner with limited run-off modeled after turn 8 at Istanbul Park, before the final two corners of the circuit, a pair of left-hand bends that return the drivers to the main straight.

==== Reception ====
The reception from drivers ahead of the inaugural race was highly positive. Fernando Alonso and Lewis Hamilton both praised the circuit, suggesting that it would be considerably more difficult to learn than other recent additions to the Formula One calendar. Jenson Button described the first sector as "spectacular", but remarked that he felt that starting second would be better than starting first as the placement of pole position put it on a steeper incline than the rest of the grid. Mark Webber called the track "pretty good", praising in particular the track's quick first sector. Kamui Kobayashi however was less enthusiastic, claiming that he did not feel intimidated by the steep climb to the first corner as it was no different from Eau Rouge at the Circuit de Spa-Francorchamps, and accusing the media of hyping it up without precedent.

=== Grand Plaza ===
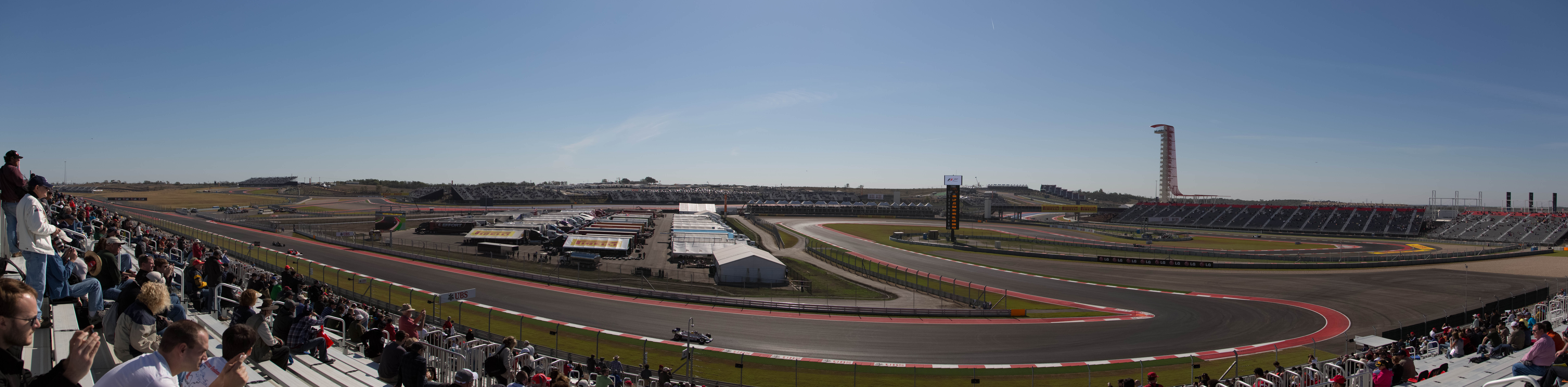
COTA on race day

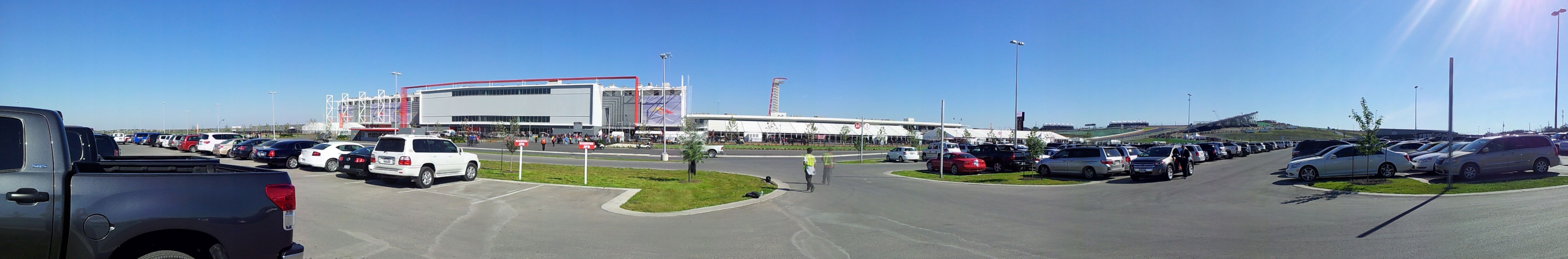
COTA on opening day – from Parking Lot A

Bordered by the track on three sides, the Grand Plaza is a 20 acres (0.081 km^{2}) space designed by Miró Rivera Architects of Austin, Texas that includes a large reflecting pool, lawn, and varying landscape zones. A promenade along the north side of the Grand Plaza hosts concessions, retail, restroom facilities, and entrances to spectator seating. From the southeast end of the Grand Plaza, two pedestrian bridges cross over turns 16 and 3 to provide access for visitors to other areas of the circuit complex.

=== Observation tower ===
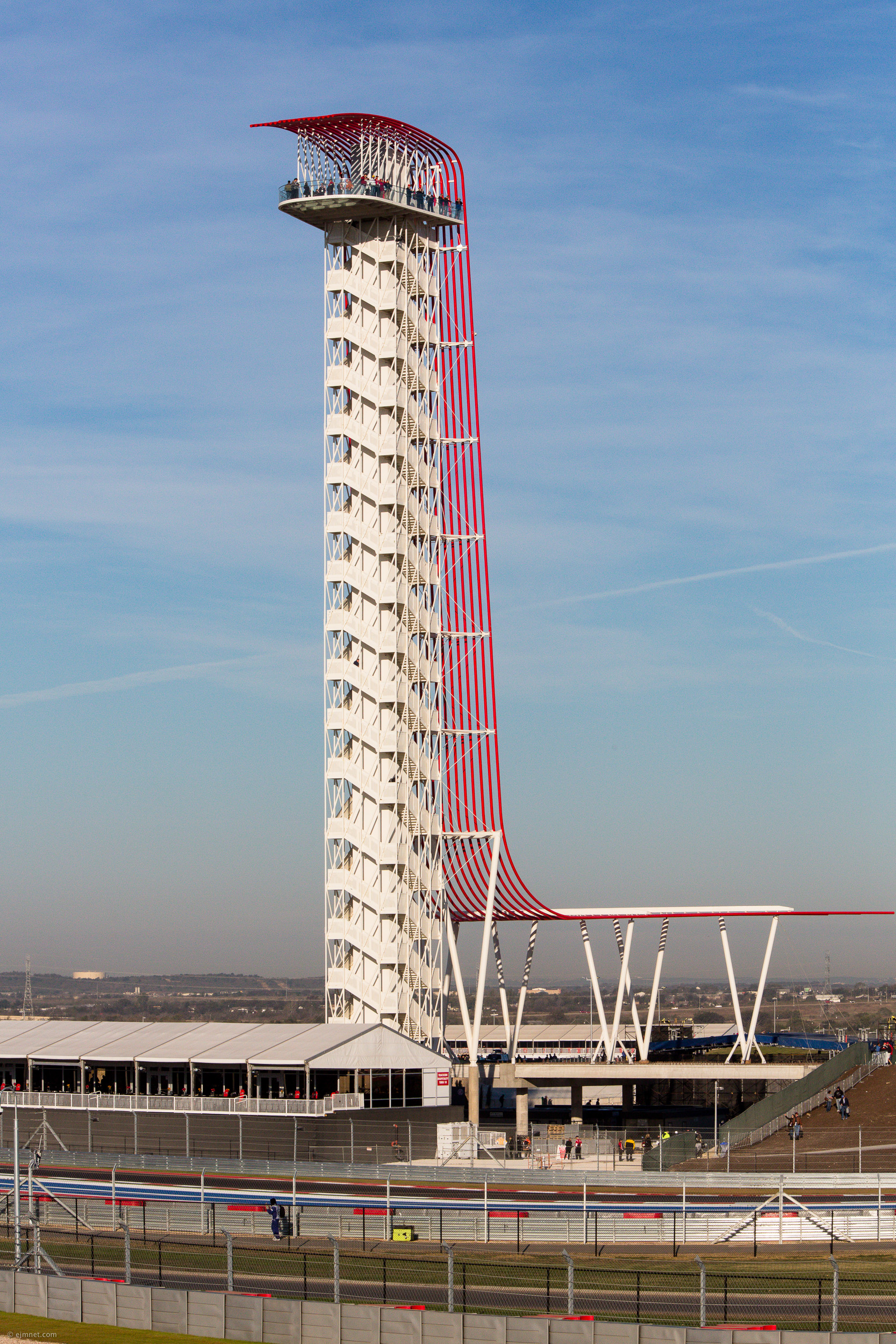
Tower at COTA

The Circuit of the Americas features a 251 ft (77 m) observation tower designed by Miró Rivera Architects and built by Patriot Erectors as a landmark for the venue. The structure of the tower consists of an elevator hoist-way surrounded by a double helix staircase of 419 stairs, both of which lead to an observation platform 230 ft (70 m) above ground level. The platform provides a 360-degree panorama of the circuit, as well as views to downtown Austin, Texas. The observation platform, which is accessible to the public for an admission fee, can accommodate up to 70 visitors and features glass railings and a partial glass floor. In addition, a "veil" consisting of 18 bright red steel tubes runs nearly the full height of the tower, acting as a canopy for both the observation platform and the stage below. The design of the observation tower was inspired by the visual imagery of sports cars and movement, and the red color was selected to mimic the streaks of lights trailing racecars at night.

=== Germania Insurance Amphitheater ===
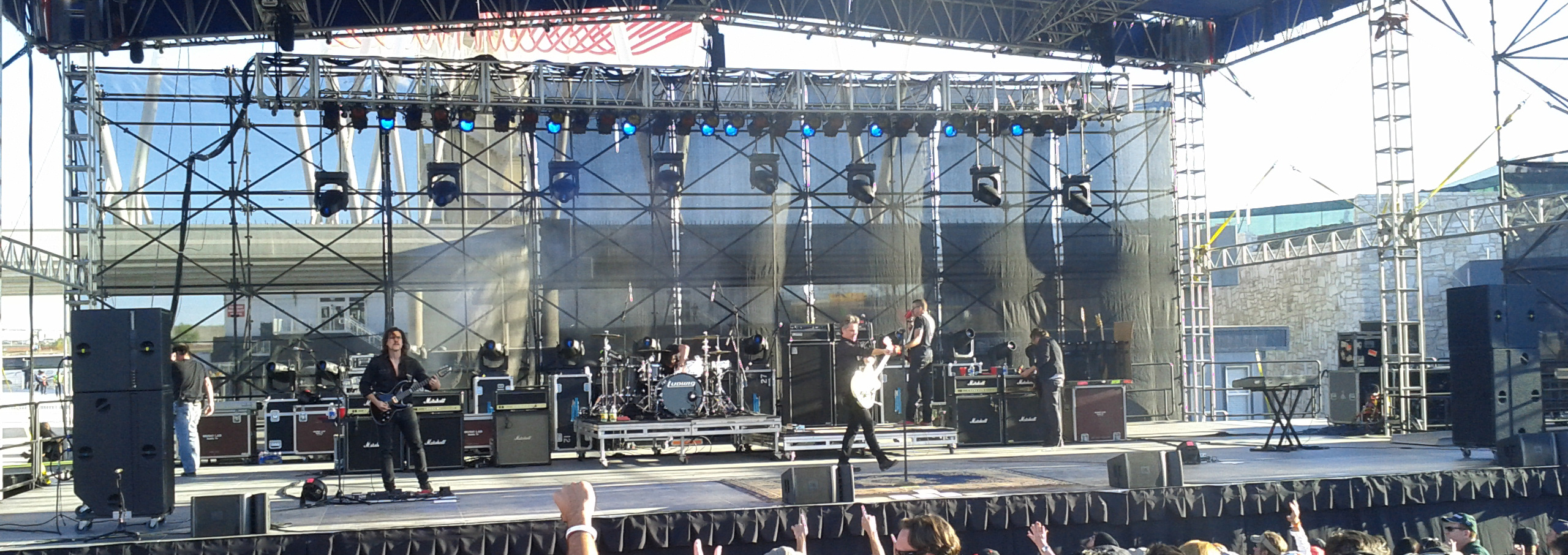
Collective Soul performing at the Tower Amphitheater

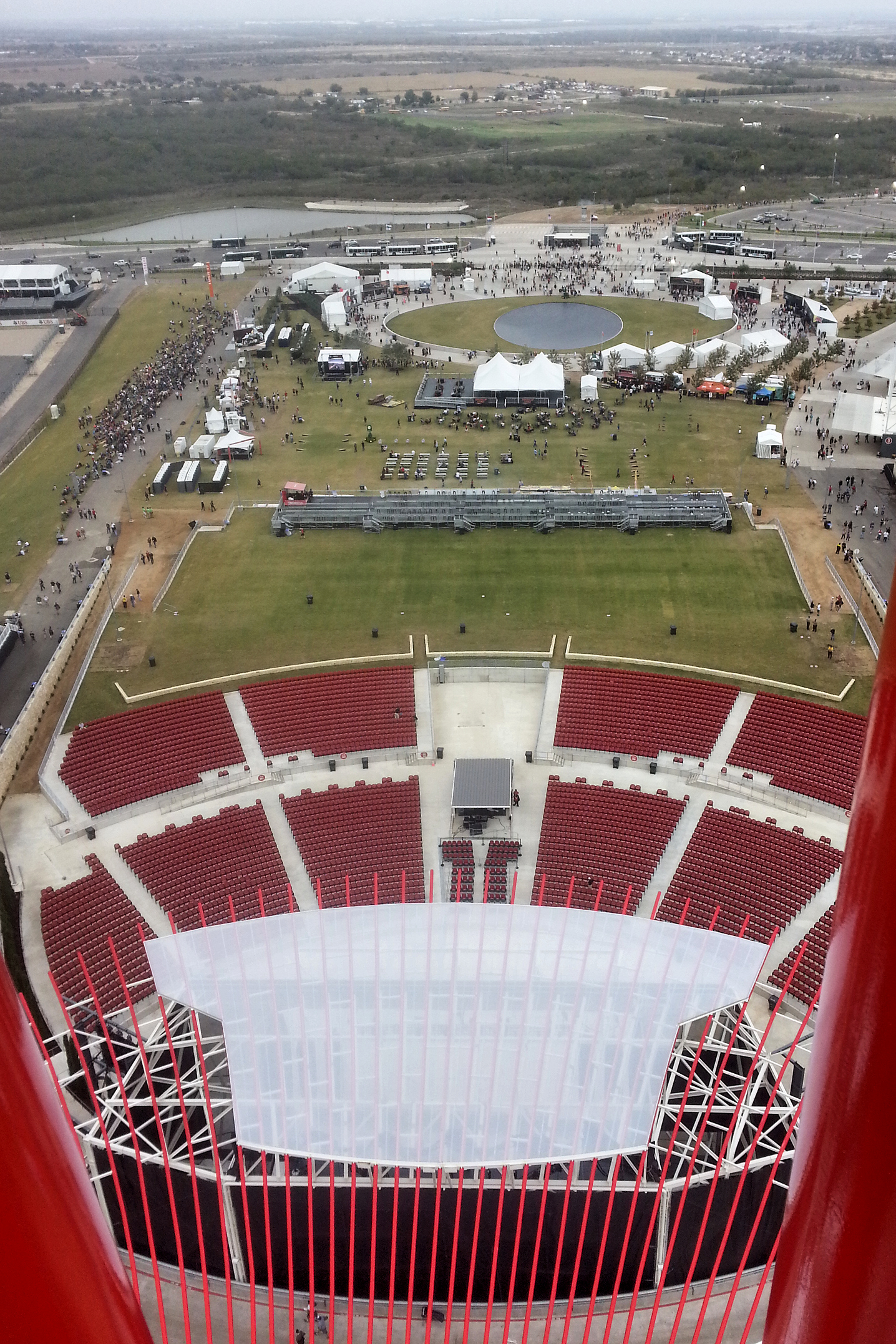
The Germania Insurance Amphitheater as seen from the top of the tower

On July 23, 2012, COTA announced a booking agreement with Live Nation to book major concerts at an open air amphitheater to be built at the base of the observation tower. Designed by Miró Rivera Architects, the venue opened in April 2013 with a concert by Kenny Chesney. The amphitheater accommodates up to 14,000 people with 5,240 permanent reserved seats. Another 1,700 seats can be configured on the stage-front floor or there is standing room for 2,300. The remaining general admission spots are on a sloping grass area behind the reserved seats. The venue was originally going to be called Tower Amphitheater, but under a deal closed in March 2013, was renamed to Austin360 Amphitheater, with naming rights sold to the entertainment/events website associated with the Austin American-Statesman. Beginning January 1, 2020, COTA renamed the venue the Germania Insurance Amphitheater under a seven-year deal with the Brenham, Texas–based insurance company.

=== Germania Insurance Super Stage ===
The Germania Insurance Super Stage is a temporary stage used for concerts that exceed the 14,000 capacity of the Germania Insurance Amphitheater. The Super Stage is mainly used for the F1 Concerts and the big acts. It is located in the infield of Circuit of the Americas between Turn 11 and Turn 12. ESPN built the Super Stage for the X Games Austin 2015.

=== Main Grandstand ===
The primary permanent seating at Circuit of the Americas is located within the Main Grandstand, designed by Miró Rivera Architects. Above-ground construction on the grandstand began in March 2012, and the "topping out" occurred in June 2012 with completion in time for the inaugural United States Grand Prix.

The Main Grandstand is 65 ft (20 m) tall, and has a total capacity of approximately 9,000 spectators. The seating is divided into three levels: lower level (capacity ~5400, including Loge Boxes), club level (capacity ~2900), and suite level (capacity ~750). The majority of seating is covered by a tensile fabric canopy. The primary structure is 500 ft (150 m) long, while the lower risers extend an additional 500 ft (150 m). The grandstand also contains concessions, restrooms, offices, and two lounge spaces located at the second and third levels. The Velocity Lounge on the second level is approximately 7,100 sq ft (660 m^{2}), and contains a 36-screen video wall and the acrylic painting "Velocity" by Dallas-based artist Christopher Martin measuring 120 ft (37 m) in length.

Both the Main Grandstand and the concessions buildings in the Grand Plaza were conceived as a modular system consisting of several components that can be arranged according to need. The concessions, with banners and deep canopies, can be expanded with restrooms, permanent seating or suites. Inherent to this "kit-of-parts" construction system is flexibility allowing the site to grow and change.

=== Karting ===
The facility features a karting track that has 15 turns and is 0.63 mi (1.01 km) long. It has wide turns, a set of S-turns and a new hairpin turn that comes off a sweeper turn. The Karting Track is located in front of the Main Grandstand. The karts can go up to speeds up to 55 mph (89 km/h).

=== Bold Stadium ===
Bold Stadium
- Interactive map of Bold Stadium
- Address: Del Valle, TX 78617
- Location: Austin, Texas
- Coordinates: 30.1359°N 97.6393°W
- Capacity: 5,036
- Surface: Grass
- Field shape: Rectangular

Construction
- Groundbreaking: October 2018; 8 years ago
- Opened: 2019

Tenants
- Austin Bold FC (USLC) (2019–2021); Austin Gilgronis (MLR) (2020–2022)

In August 2017, a new soccer-specific stadium was announced to be built between the Amphitheater and the Grand Plaza. A professional soccer team known as Austin Bold FC began playing in the USL Championship in 2019 until 2021. The stadium seats 5,000 people. The Austin Gilgronis of Major League Rugby were playing home games at the stadium in 2020.

=== COTALAND ===
COTALAND is a theme park on the grounds of the Circuit of the Americas. It is scheduled to open on September 26, 2026. The park will feature thirty-plus rides on thirty acres between turns 19 and 20 of the COTA racetrack. One of the major rides is Circuit Breaker, the first tilt roller coaster in Texas and second in the United States. Circuit Breaker opened for preview rides during the 2025 United States Grand Prix weekend on a pay-per-ride basis. Another large roller coaster, Palindrome, is a Gerstlauer “Infinity shuttle coaster” and the first steel coaster in the United States to pass over an active road. The idea behind COTALAND is to make COTA a year-round destination, instead of only hosting occasional races and events.

=== Hotel ===
Plans for a $985 million resort on the western portion of the site included a 1,000-room hotel and a conference center with approximately 170,000 square feet of rentable space.

On April 23, 2026, Austin City Council authorized negotiations with RIDA COTA Hotel, LLC over an economic development agreement lasting up to 30 years. The proposed agreement provided for performance-based payments capped at 8.25 percent of gross room revenue, subject to annual council appropriations. Final approval of the agreement was reserved for a subsequent council vote.

== Layout configurations ==
Circuit of the Americas layout configurations
Grand Prix Circuit (2012–present)

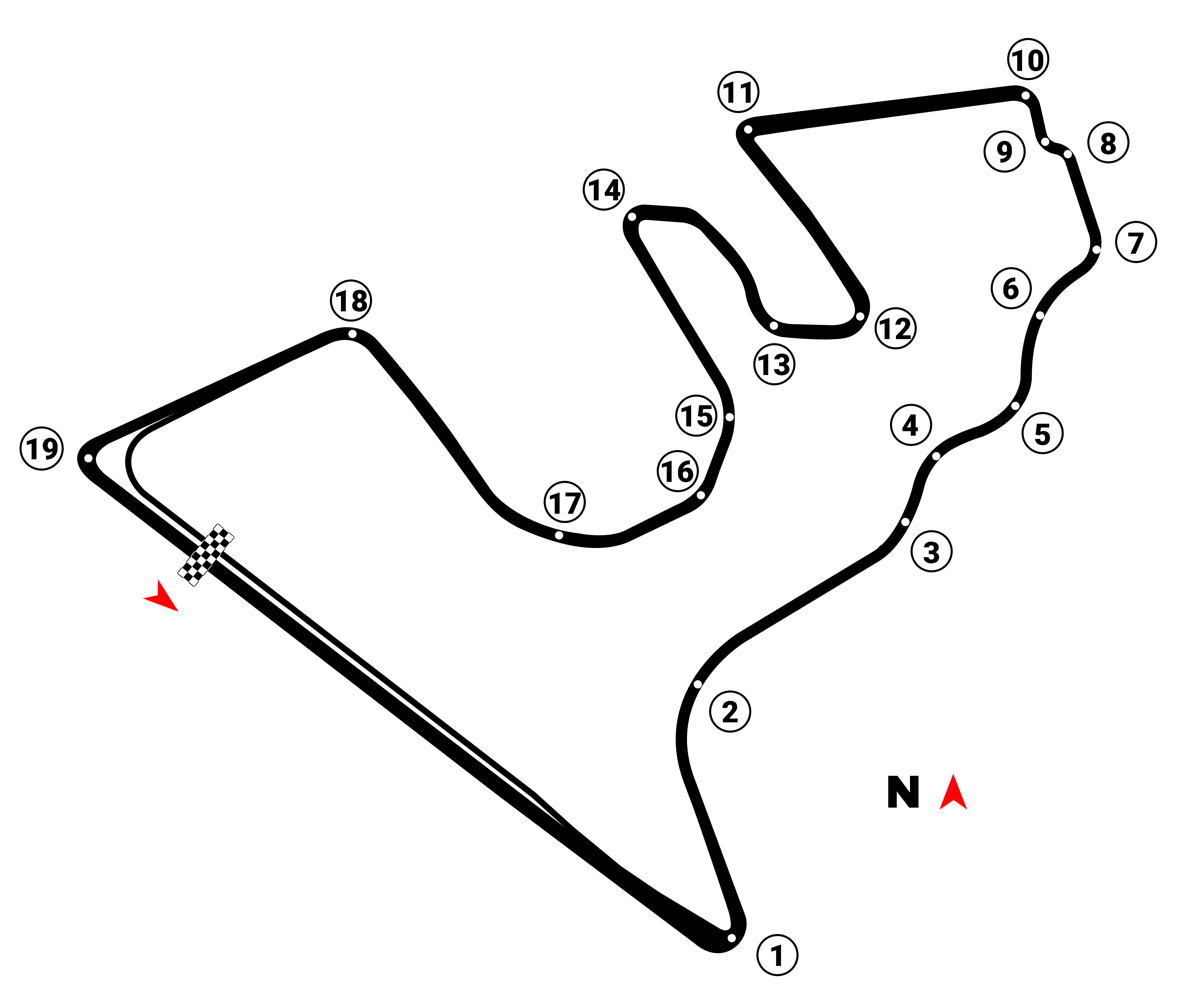
National Circuit (2012–present)

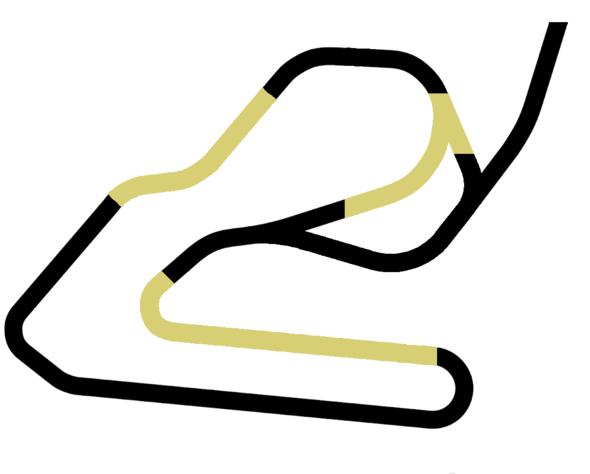
Rallycross Circuit (2018–present)

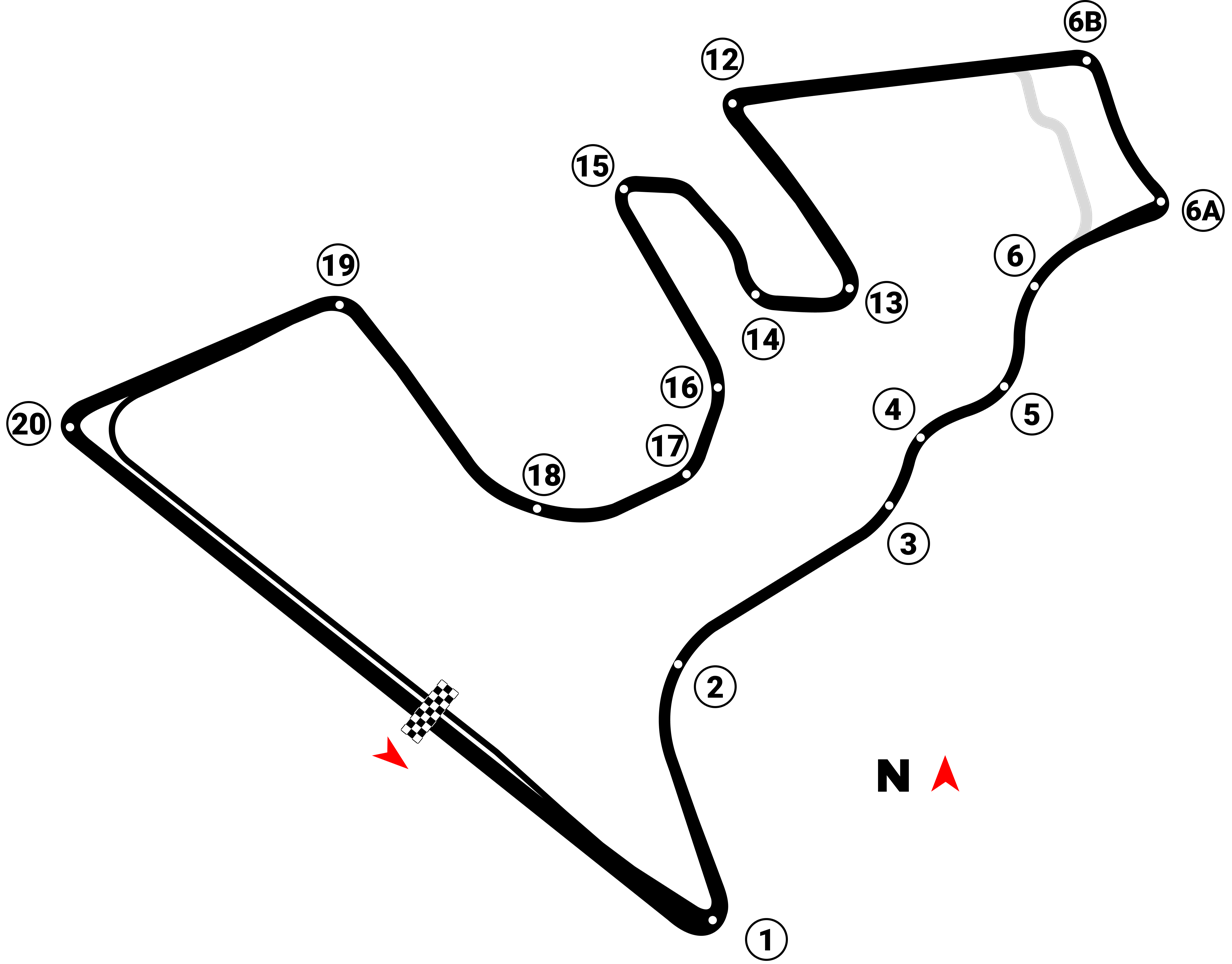
NASCAR Circuit (2025–present)

== Records ==
=== Official record race lap times ===
As of September 2026, the fastest official race lap records at the Circuit of the Americas are listed as:

Category	Time	Driver	Vehicle	Event
Grand Prix Circuit (2012–present): 3.426 mi (5.513 km)
F1	1:36.169	Charles Leclerc	Ferrari SF90	2019 United States Grand Prix
LMP1	1:47.052	Loïc Duval	Audi R18	2016 6 Hours of Circuit of the Americas
IndyCar	1:48.8953	Colton Herta	Dallara IR-18	2019 IndyCar Classic
Formula V8	1:51.437	René Binder	Dallara T12	2017 Austin Formula V8 round
LMP2	1:52.545	Nyck de Vries	Oreca 07	2020 Lone Star Le Mans
LMH	1:52.564	Kamui Kobayashi	Toyota GR010 Hybrid	2024 Lone Star Le Mans
LMDh	1:52.584	Charles Milesi	Alpine A424	2024 Lone Star Le Mans
Indy Lights	1:56.5740	Oliver Askew	Dallara IL-15	2019 Indy Lights Classic
DPi	1:57.198	Jordan Taylor	Cadillac DPi-V.R	2017 Advance Auto Parts Sportscar Showdown
DP	1:58.616	Joey Hand	Riley Mk XXVI	2015 Lone Star Le Mans
LMPC	2:01.245	Renger van der Zande	Oreca FLM09	2015 Lone Star Le Mans
LMP3	2:01.352	Jules Caranta	Duqueine D09	2026 2nd Austin IMSA VP Racing SportsCar Challenge round
MotoGP	2:02.037	Ai Ogura	Aprilia RS-GP 26	2026 United States motorcycle Grand Prix
Formula Atlantic	2:02.514	Flinn Lazier	Swift 016.a	2019 Austin SCCA Formula Atlantic round
LM GTE	2:02.522	Nicki Thiim	Aston Martin Vantage AMR	2020 Lone Star Le Mans
Pro Mazda	2:03.116	Matthew Brabham	Star Formula Mazda 'Pro'	2013 Austin Pro Mazda Championship round
GT3	2:03.650	Scott Blind	Porsche 911 (992 I) GT3 R	2026 Austin Apex Focus Sprint round
Formula Regional	2:04.698	Linus Lundqvist	Ligier JS F3	2020 Austin FR Americas round
TA1	2:04.787	Matthew Brabham	Ford Mustang Trans-Am	2025 Austin Trans-Am round
GT	2:05.053	Jonathan Bomarito	SRT Viper GTS-R	2013 International Sports Car Weekend
Ferrari Challenge	2:05.246	Johnny Kaminskey	Ferrari 296 Challenge	2026 Austin Ferrari Challenge North America round
Porsche Carrera Cup	2:06.061	Alan Metni	Porsche 911 (992 II) Cup	2026 Austin Apex Focus Sprint round
Moto2	2:06.456	David Alonso	Kalex Moto2	2026 United States motorcycle Grand Prix
Lamborghini Super Trofeo	2:06.698	Danny Formal	Lamborghini Huracán LP 620-2 Super Trofeo Evo2	2024 Austin Lamborghini Super Trofeo North America round
Superbike	2:07.497	Cameron Beaubier	BMW M1000RR	2025 Austin MotoAmerica Superbike round
Formula 4	2:08.107	Marta García	Tatuus F4-T421	2023 Austin F1 Academy round
Radical Cup	2:08.182	Robert Rossi	Radical SR10	2026 Austin Radical Cup North America round
McLaren Trophy	2:08.343	John Capestro-Dubets	McLaren Artura Trophy	2025 Austin McLaren Trophy America round
Grand-Am GT	2:09.009	Eric Curran	Chevrolet Corvette C6.R GT2	2013 Grand-Am of the Americas
Formula 1000	2:09.229	JR Osborne	Citation F1000	2013 Austin US Formula 1000 Championship round
TA2	2:10.090	Helio Meza	Chevrolet Camaro Trans-Am	2025 Austin Trans-Am round
NASCAR Cup	2:11.549	Christopher Bell	Toyota Camry TRD	2024 EchoPark Automotive Grand Prix
Bagger World Cup	2:12.348	Oscar Gutierrez	Harley-Davidson Road Glide	2026 Austin Harley-Davidson Bagger World Cup round
Supersport	2:12.544	Mathew Scholtz	Yamaha YZF-R9	2025 Austin MotoAmerica Supersport round
Moto3	2:13.417	Guido Pini	Honda NSF250RW	2026 United States motorcycle Grand Prix
NASCAR Truck	2:13.440	Corey Heim	Toyota Tundra NASCAR	2024 XPEL 225
USF Juniors	2:13.980	Nicolas Giaffone	Tatuus JR-23	2023 Cooper Tires Circuit of the Americas Grand Prix
NASCAR Xfinity	2:13.985	Shane van Gisbergen	Chevrolet Camaro SS NASCAR	2024 Focused Health 250
GT4	2:14.539	Josh Green	Porsche 718 Cayman GT4 RS Clubsport	2026 Austin Apex Focus Sprint round
SRO GT2	2:14.850	Alan Grossberg	Lamborghini Huracán Super Trofeo GT2	2024 Austin GT America round
Grand-Am GX	2:17.876	Spencer Pumpelly	Porsche Cayman	2013 Grand-Am of the Americas
Twins Cup	2:17.997	Alessandro Di Mario	Aprilia RS660	2024 Austin MotoAmerica Twins Cup round
Mustang Challenge	2:18.332	Cole Loftsgard	Ford Mustang Dark Horse R	2026 Austin Mustang Challenge round
TCR Touring Car	2:18.404	Tyler Maxson	Hyundai Veloster N TCR	2020 1st Austin TC America round
Formula Ford	2:18.845	James Weida	Scorpion W1	2023 Austin SCCA Formula Ford round
Toyota GR Cup	2:28.112	Jaxon Bell	Toyota GR86	2025 Austin Toyota GR Cup North America round
Mazda MX-5 Cup	2:31.0334	Selin Rollan	Mazda MX-5 (ND)	2019 Austin Mazda MX-5 Cup round
250cc	2:37.150	Jesse Shedden	Aprilia RS250SP2	2022 Austin North America Talent Cup round
NASCAR Circuit (2025–present): 2.400 mi (3.862 km)
LMP3	1:29.216	Wyatt Brichacek	Ligier JS P325	2026 1st Austin IMSA VP Racing SportsCar Challenge round
GT3	1:32.499	Jake Walker	BMW M4 GT3	2025 Austin IMSA VP Racing SportsCar Challenge round
GT4	1:38.903	Kiko Porto	Toyota GR Supra GT4 Evo2	2025 Austin IMSA VP Racing SportsCar Challenge round
NASCAR Cup	1:39.244	Kyle Larson	Chevrolet Camaro ZL1 NASCAR	2025 EchoPark Automotive Grand Prix
NASCAR O'Reilly Auto Parts	1:39.452	Shane van Gisbergen	Chevrolet Camaro SS NASCAR	2026 Focused Health 250
National Circuit (2012–present): 2.300 mi (3.702 km)
Pirelli World Challenge GT	1:33.284	Johnny O'Connell	Cadillac CTS-V	2013 Austin Pirelli World Challenge round
V8 Supercars	1:33.5415	Jason Bright	Holden Commodore (VF)	2013 Austin 400
Porsche Carrera Cup	1:35.3252	Madison Snow	Porsche 911 (997 II) GT3 Cup	2013 Austin GT3 Cup Trophy USA West round
Pirelli World Challenge GTS	1:40.720	Andy Lee	Chevrolet Camaro	2013 Austin Pirelli World Challenge round
Pirelli World Challenge TC	1:46.244	Remo Ruscitti	Honda Civic Si	2013 Austin Pirelli World Challenge round
Pirelli World Challenge TCB	2:00.908	Ernie Francis Jr.	Mazda 2	2013 Austin Pirelli World Challenge round

=== Other records ===
The fastest unofficial lap record is 1:32.029 set by Valtteri Bottas in a Mercedes AMG F1 W10 EQ Power+ during qualifying at the 2019 United States Grand Prix.

The first official production car record is 2:10.7 set in a Czinger 21C in 2024. Records before COTA officially started tracking production cars were held by the Hennessey Venom F5 Revolution and the McLaren P1.

The top speed of 221.5 mph (355 km/h) was achieved by Maverick Viñales in 2023 in an Aprilia MotoGP bike.

== Events ==
=== Current events ===
- February: Apex One Endurance
- March: Grand Prix motorcycle racing United States motorcycle Grand Prix, NASCAR Cup Series DuraMAX Grand Prix, NASCAR O'Reilly Auto Parts Series Focused Health 250, IMSA VP Racing SportsCar Challenge, Harley-Davidson Bagger World Cup
- April: GT World Challenge America, GT America Series, GT4 America Series, TC America Series, Toyota Gazoo Racing Cup North America
- May: IMSA VP Racing SportsCar Challenge, Ferrari Challenge North America, Porsche Sprint Challenge North America, Mustang Cup Series
- September: FIA World Endurance Championship Lone Star Le Mans, MotoAmerica Superbikes at Texas, Mustang Challenge North America, Radical Cup North America
- October: Formula One United States Grand Prix, F1 Academy, Porsche Carrera Cup North America
- November: Trans-Am Series Racing America @ COTA, Sportscar Vintage Racing Association
- December: World Racing League COTA National Championship, ChampCar Endurance Series

=== Future events ===
- Formula E
  - Austin ePrix (2027)
- Intercontinental GT Challenge
  - Texas 8 Hour (2027)
- McLaren Trophy America (2025, 2027)

=== Minor events ===
The circuit hosts minor completions such as:

Minor events
Completion	Race Name	Years
Sportscar Vintage Racing Association	U.S. Vintage Racing National Championship	2013–present
Ferrari Challenge North America	Ferrari Challenge at COTA	2013–2014, 2016–2020, 2022–2024, 2026
World Racing League	COTA National Championship	2015–present
ChampCar Endurance Series	The Lone Star Double Down at COTA	2016–2017, 2020, 2026
GT4 America Series	Lone Star Enduro at COTA	2019–2021, 2023–present
TC America Series	TC America at COTA	2019–2021, 2023–present
GT America Series	GT America at COTA	2021, 2023–present
Porsche Carrera Cup North America	Porsche Carrera Cup North America at COTA	2021, 2023–present
Porsche Sprint Challenge North America	Porsche Sprint Challenge North America at COTA	2021, 2023–present
Toyota Gazoo Racing Cup North America	Gazoo Racing Cup North America at COTA	2023–present
F1 Academy	F1 Academy at COTA	2023, 2026
Mustang Challenge North America	Mustang Challenge at COTA	2024–present
IMSA VP Racing SportsCar Challenge	IMSA VP Racing SportsCar Challenge at COTA	2025–2026
Apex One Endurance	Apex One Endurance 12H of COTA	2026
Harley-Davidson Bagger World Cup	Harley-Davidson Bagger World Cup at COTA	2026
Radical Cup North America	Radical Cup North America at COTA	2026

=== Former events ===
The track has hosted various events like the IMSA SportsCar Championship, IndyCar Series and the X Games.

Former events
Completion	Race Name	Years
Porsche Pirelli GT3 Cup Trophy USA	Porsche Pirelli GT3 Cup Trophy at COTA	2012–2013, 2015–2018
Rolex Sports Car Series	Grand-Am of the Americas	2013
Michelin Pilot Challenge	Lone Star Le Mans	2013–2017
USF Pro 2000 Championship	USF Pro 2000 at COTA	2013, 2023
Sports Car Club of America	The Lone Star Grand Prix	2013, 2017–2023
US Formula 1000 Championship	US Formula 1000 Championship at COTA	2013
Grand Prix motorcycle racing	Motorcycle Grand Prix of the Americas	2013–2019, 2021–2025
V8 Supercars	Austin 400	2013
American Le Mans Series	International Sports Car Weekend	2013
IMSA Prototype Lites	IMSA Prototype Lites at COTA	2013
IMSA GT3 Cup Challenge	Porsche GT3 Cup Challenge USA at COTA	2013–2017
Summer X Games	X Games Austin	2014–2016
IMSA SportsCar Championship	Advance Auto Parts Sportscar Showdown	2014–2017
Porsche Supercup	Austin Race	2014–2016
Global Rallycross	X Games Austin	2014–2015
Stadium Super Trucks	X Games Austin, SST at COTA	2014–2015, 2019
Lamborghini Super Trofeo North America	Lamborghini Super Trofeo North America at COTA	2015–2017, 2021, 2024
Masters Racing Legends	Masters Racing Legends @ COTA	2015, 2017, 2019, 2021–2024
NACAM Formula 4 Championship	F4 NACAM at COTA	2016
Radical Cup North America	Radical Cup North America at COTA	2016–2023
American Flat Track	Flat Track at COTA	2016
SprintX GT Championship Series	SprintX at COTA	2017–2018
Formula 4 United States Championship	F4 at COTA	2017–2024
World Series Formula V8 3.5	Austin Race	2017
24H Series	Hankook 24H COTA	2017–2019
Mazda MX-5 Cup	Global MX-5 Cup at COTA	2018–2019
Americas Rallycross Championship	ARX of Austin	2018–2019
National Auto Sport Association	NASA Championships at COTA	2018
FIA World Rallycross Championship	World RX of the United States	2018
Formula Regional Americas Championship	FR Americas at COTA	2018, 2020–2024
IndyCar Series	IndyCar Classic	2019
Indy Lights	Indy Lights Classic	2019
Super Lap Battle	SLB at COTA	2020–2025
GT Sports Club America	GT Sports Club at COTA	2020
GT Celebration	Masters @ GT Celebration	2021–2022
W Series	Austin W Series round	2021
NASCAR Craftsman Truck Series	XPEL 225	2021–2024
North America Talent Cup	North America Talent Cup at COTA	2022
USF Juniors	Cooper Tires Circuit of the Americas Grand Prix Finale	2022–2023
Ligier JS F4 Series	Ligier JS F4 Series at COTA	2024

=== Cancelled events ===
COTA would have hosted the inaugural Intercontinental GT Challenge and the AutoNation INDYCAR Challenge.

Cancelled events
Completion	Race Name	Years
V8 Supercars	Austin 400	2014
Intercontinental GT Challenge	6 Hours of the Americas	2016
Blancpain GT Series	Blancpain GT Series at COTA	2016
IndyCar Series	AutoNation Indycar Challenge	2020
Formula One	United States Grand Prix	2020
MotoAmerica	Championship of Texas	2020–2021
FIA Formula 3 Championship	F3 at COTA	2021
W Series	Austin W Series round	2022
