= Barella =

Barella is an Italian surname. Notable people with the surname include:

- Dominique Barella, French magistrate, trade unionist, and official
- Mauro Barella (born 1956), Italian pole vaulter
- Nicolò Barella (born 1997), Italian footballer
