= Tony Parella =

Tony Parella (born July 25, 1959, in Syracuse, New York) is president and CEO of the Sportscar Vintage Racing Association, SVRA and the owner of the Trans Am Race Company, LLC (TARC) which operates the Trans-Am series. He spent 30 years in various executive positions in the telecommunications industry prior to acquiring auto racing businesses. Among the telecommunications firms, he joined were Sprint, MFS Intellinet, Allegiance Telecom, and Shared Technologies. Shared Technologies made the Fortune Magazine Top 100 Places to Work list four consecutive years with the best placing of 18th. In 2012 Parella acquired the then-30-year-old SportsCar Vintage Racing Association (SVRA). The event calendar includes races at motorsports facilities such as the Indianapolis Motor Speedway, the Circuit of the Americas (COTA), Watkins Glen International, Road America, Sebring International Raceway, and Mid-Ohio Sports Car Course among others. Parella is a graduate of Morrisville College and attended the six-week Harvard Business School Advanced Management Program.

== Auto racing ==
Tony Parella remained a motorsports enthusiast since his teenage oval track racing days when he competed at Canadagua Speedway, Rolling Wheels Speedway and Weedsport Speedway - all dirt tracks. With his departure from the telecommunications industry, he began vintage racing with the Corinthian Vintage Auto Racing (CVAR) club in Texas in 2010. That experience led him to look at vintage racing as a business development opportunity and he purchased the SVRA in September 2012 after forming Parella Motorsports Holdings, LLC (PMH). At virtually the same time PMH acquired the Historic Sportscar Racing - West (HSR) organization and consolidated it into SVRA.

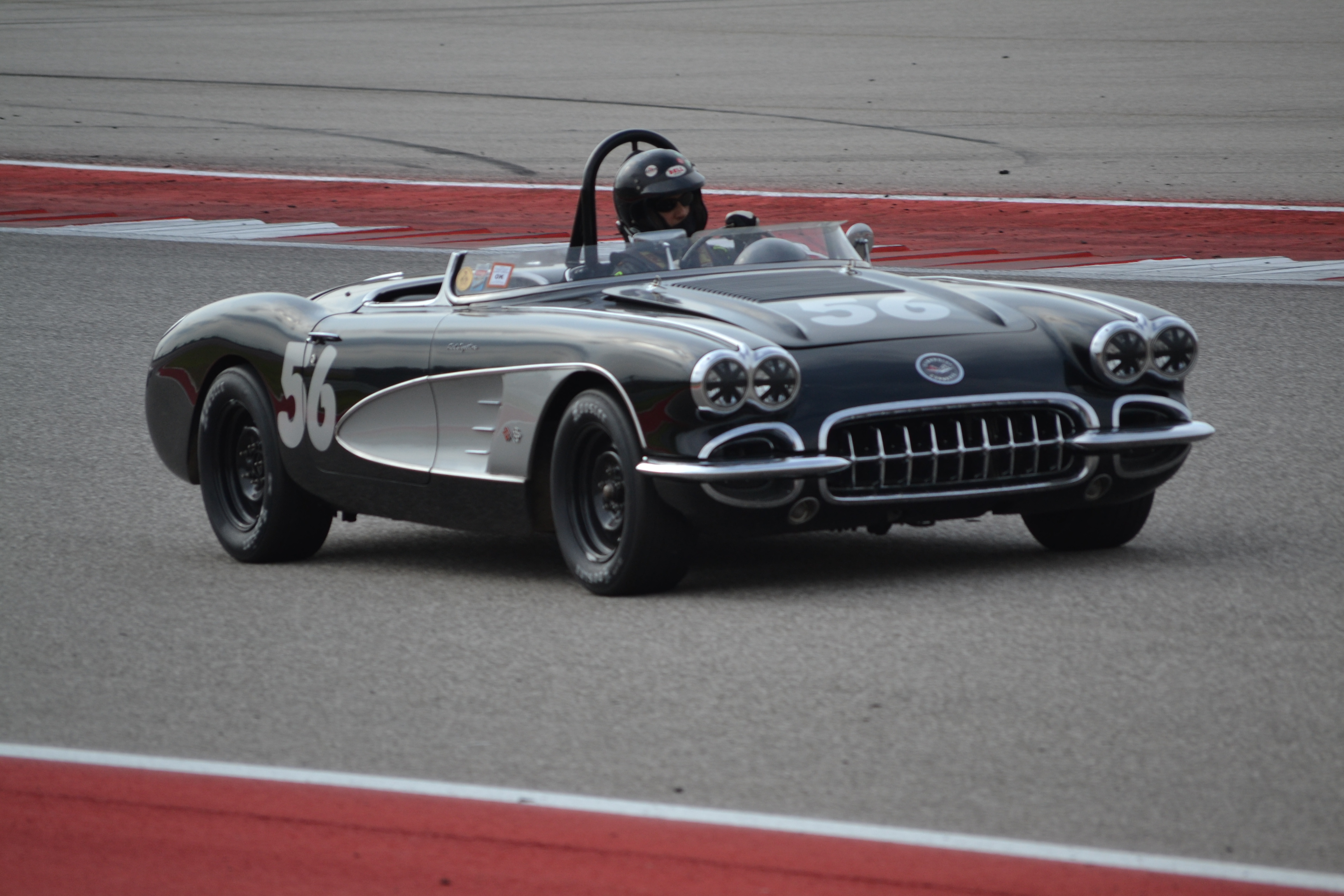
Parella racing his 1958 Corvette roadster at COTA in 2016.

The acquisition of California-based General Racing in July 2014 gave the organization a West Coast footprint. The event calendar was 16 weekends in 2016. The SVRA has 2,500 licensed members and a database of 11,000 cars. Sponsors include Jaguar, NetJets, and Hoosier Tire

In 2016 PMH acquired an ownership position in the Trans-Am series. On August 8, 2017, Parella acquired the majority interest in TARC and in 2020 he secured full ownership. The Trans Am series regularly shares venues with the SVRA on event weekends. In 2020 PMH acquired commercial rights to SCCA Pro Racing's two formula racing series, F4 U.S. and FR Americas.
