= Roebling Road Raceway =

Road racing course near Bloomingdale, GA, US

Coordinates: 32°10′11″N 81°19′24″W

- Location: Effingham County, at 1135 Roebling Road, Bloomingdale, Georgia, United States
- Owner: Roebling Road Raceway, Inc.
- Operator: Roebling Road Raceway, Inc.
- Opened: 1959; 67 years ago
- Major events: –
- Website: http://www.roeblingroad.com

Road Course
- Surface: Asphalt
- Length: 3.25 km (2.02 mi)
- Race lap record: 59.368 (Hans Bliss, 2004 Stohr WF1, 2025, TTU)

Roebling Road Raceway, formerly Savannah International Raceway, is a 2.02-mile (3.25 km) road racing course located just outside Bloomingdale, Georgia, United States. Opened in 1959, Roebling Road is relatively unique amongst racetracks in that it lacks any accommodations for spectators; there are no grandstands, no picnicking areas, nor any other sort of viewing facilities, and to enter the track it is necessary to drive across the racing surface. The track was designed by John Rueter and held its first Sports Car Club of America event June 11–12, 1960. The track was financed by and named after SCCA supporter Robert Roebling, great-grandson of John A. Roebling.

Roebling Road hosts events more than 300 days a year. Events range from media, pro teams testing cars, club racing, and performance driving education events. Club races include the SCCA, the BMW Car Owners Club of America, the Porsche Club of America, the National Auto Sport Association, North American Sports Car Association, and the Vintage Drivers Club of America. The track is used by cars, motorcycles and WKA karts. The PBS television series MotorWeek records its winter track-testing segments at Roebling Road.

The track is a very safe and forgiving track, making it ideal to learn on. It is characterized by large amounts of run-off room and only a single wall.

Roebling is unusual in that it is owned by a local racing club, the Buccaneer Region of the SCCA. Roebling is a not-for-profit, non-spectator oriented track.

Roebling hosts several driver's education oriented events each month. The format varies with the hosting organization. There are relatively expensive events where the organizers provide high performance cars and, there are significantly less expensive events where drivers bring their own cars. As drivers work their way up in skill level, they are allowed to drive on the track "solo".

The fastest lap ever recorded on an official weekend is 59.368 by Hans Bliss (Bliss Racing) on 1/12/2025 during a NASA event on his prototype Stohr WF1.
