= Fire and Rescue Department (Brunei) =

Firefighting department in Brunei

Brunei Fire and Rescue Department
- Jabatan Bomba dan Penyelamat Brunei جابتن بومبا دان ڤڽلامت بروني
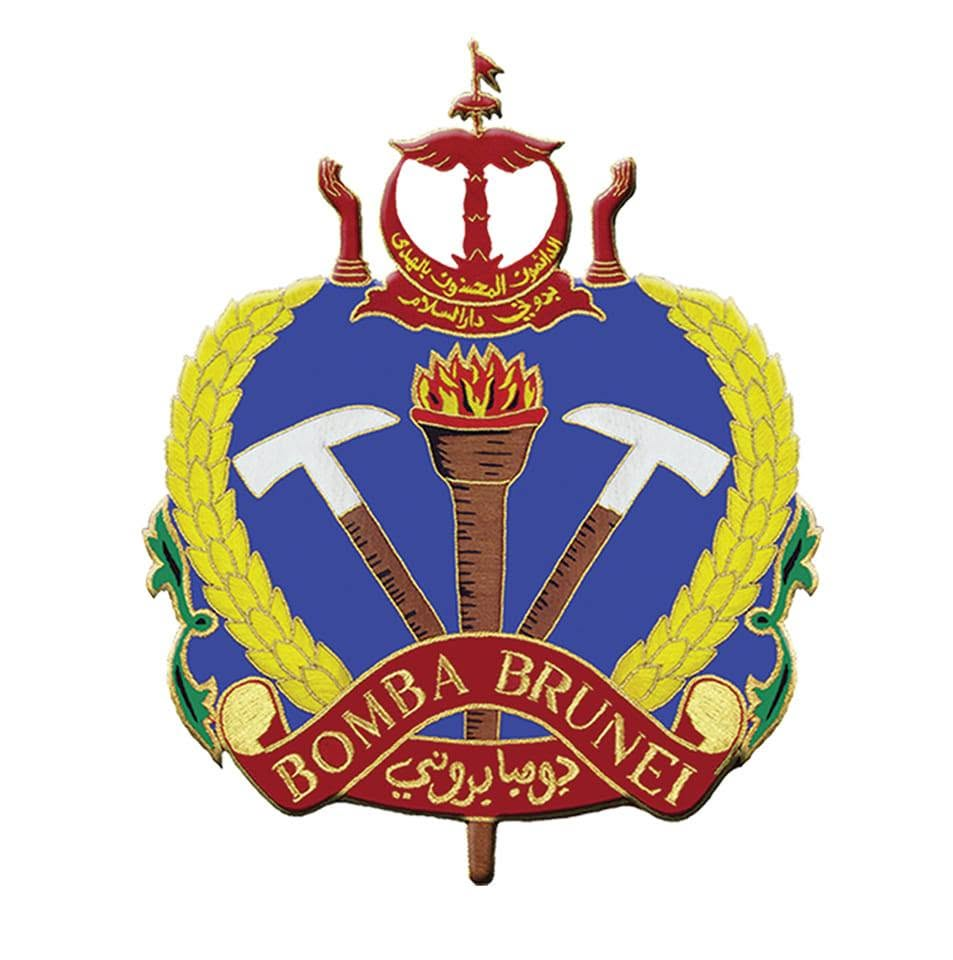
- Fire and Rescue Department Logo

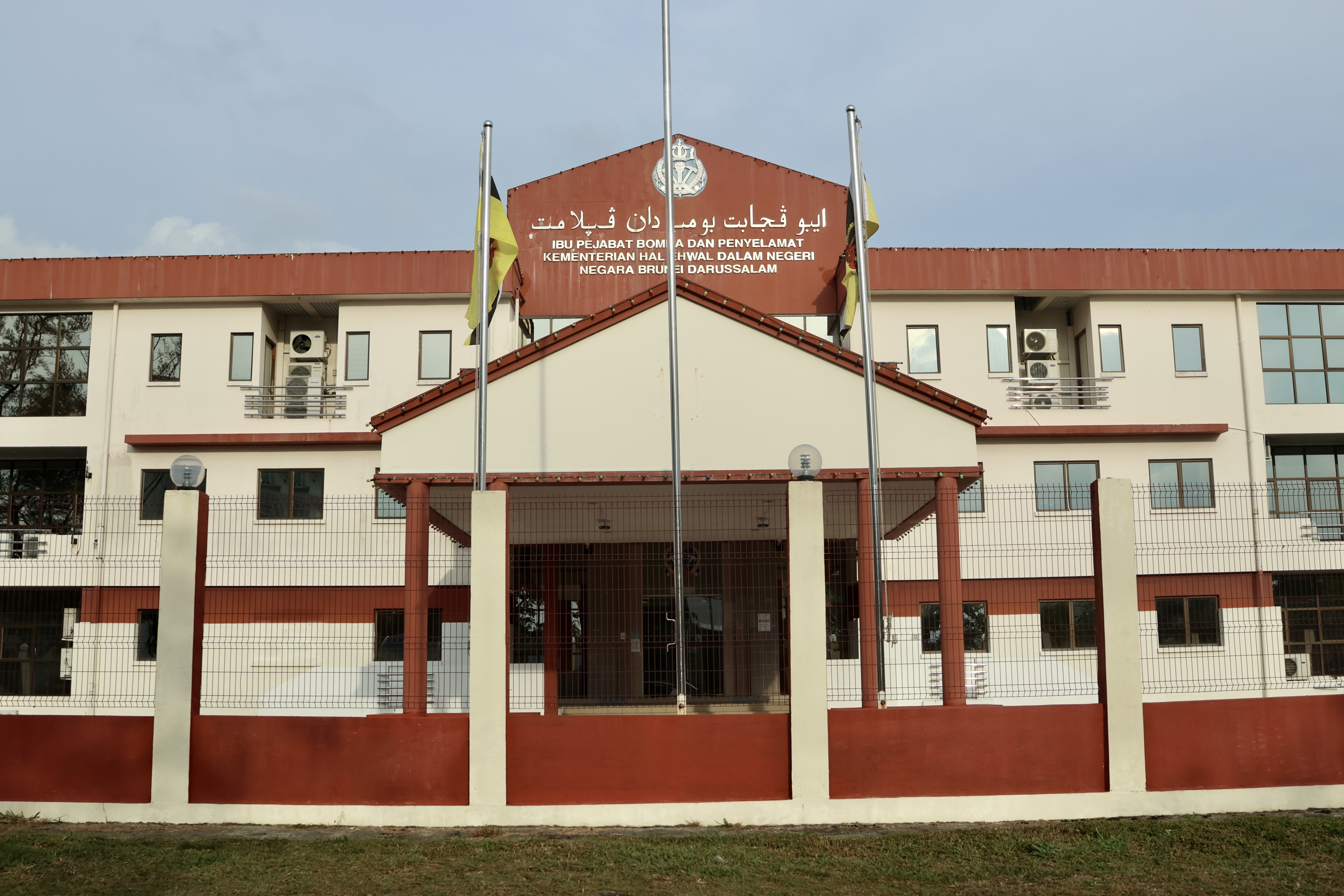
- Headquarters in 2023

Agency overview
- Formed: 1 January 1960; 66 years ago
- Type: Fire department
- Jurisdiction: Government of Brunei
- Headquarters: Ibu Pejabat Jabatan Bomba dan Penyelamat, Landasan Lama Berakas, Mukim Berakas 'A', Brunei BB3510
- Minister responsible: Ahmaddin Abdul Rahman, Minister of Home Affairs
- Agency executive: Lim Hock Guan, Acting Director
- Parent department: Ministry of Home Affairs
- Key document: Laws of Brunei - Fire and Rescue Act
- Website: Fire-Rescue.gov.bn

The Fire and Rescue Department (FRD), (Note: Malay: Jabatan Bomba dan Penyelamat (JBP), Jawi: جابتن بومبا دان ڤڽلامت,) also known as Brunei Fire and Rescue Department (BFRD), (Note: Malay: Jabatan Bomba dan Penyelamat Brunei (JBPB)) is a government agency of Brunei Darussalam, responsible for firefighting, animal rescue, and technical rescue. The department's main headquarters are located in Bandar Seri Begawan.

It is the primary and main public service firefighting force in Brunei, though there are other firefighting units run by other government agencies. Furthermore, there are additional private firefighting entities, such as the BSP Fire and Emergency Response service operated by Brunei Shell Petroleum (BSP), which own fire stations (along with firefighting vehicles and emergency ambulances) located at Anduki Airfield and Panaga, Belait District. Moreover, they also owned a single Sikorsky S-92 for search and rescue (SaR) operations.

995 is the emergency telephone number used to contact the Fire and Rescue service in Brunei.

== History ==
The Fire Service (Malay: Perkhidmatan Bomba) was originally formed under the Administration of the Royal Brunei Police Force (RBPF) in order to preserve peace and stability. On 1 January 1960; 66 years ago, the Fire Brigade (Malay: Pasukan Bomba) was officially fully established independent from the RBPF. After the formation, 36 police officers, including an Inspector were either permanently or temporarily transferred to the newly established brigade; Inspector Mohammad became the first Superintendent of Fire Brigade. Despite being independent form the RBPF, the Fire Act 1966 was still kept, until the Amendment of the Fire Services Act 2002 came into force.

The Fire Supply (Malay: Pasokan Bomba) was formed in mid-1963; 63 years ago, in which Lam Soo Man, an officer loaned from the Hong Kong Fire Service was selected to be the Fire Inspector (Malay: Pemeriksa Bomba) of the Brunei State Fire Brigade (Malay: Bomba Negeri Brunei) until 1969. On 4 August 1966; 60 years ago, the Fire Services Enactment was passed and put into service. In 1968, the Government of Brunei commenced a project to build a fire station in Tutong, on the river bank of the Tutong river. Since the establishment of the Fire Supply, officers have been loaned from Hong Kong and United Kingdom until 1980. The first local commander Dato Paduka Awang Haji Yaakob bin haji Mohd Yussof, was entrusted in 1981.

On 9 November 1987; 38 years ago, the department was renamed from Fire Supply (Pasokan Bomba) to Fire Services Department (Malay: Jabatan Perkhidmatan Bombadan) and again on 9 March 2006; 20 years ago, in which it became its present name. More than B$1.3 million cost in damage caused by fires was recorded by the FRD during the first quarter of 2007. In 2010; 16 years ago, the Sungai Liang Industrial Park (SPARK) fire station, Sungai Liang was designed and constructed in a collaboration with the FRD. A 4.5 metres (15 feet) long crocodile was captured by the Brunei Fire and Rescue Department near a shop in Kampong Salar, and later transferred to the Wildlife Division.

== List of fire stations ==
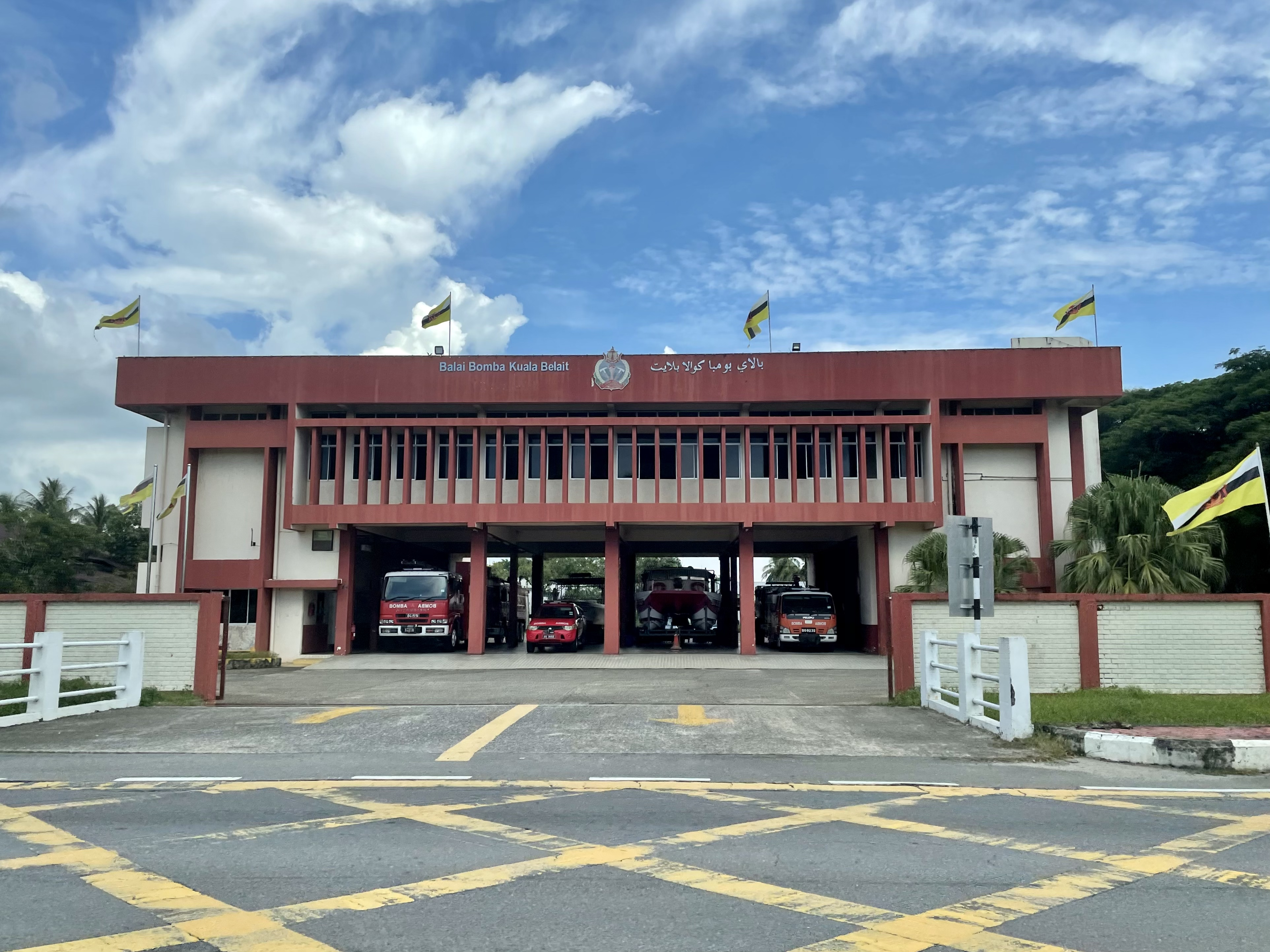
Kuala Belait Fire Station

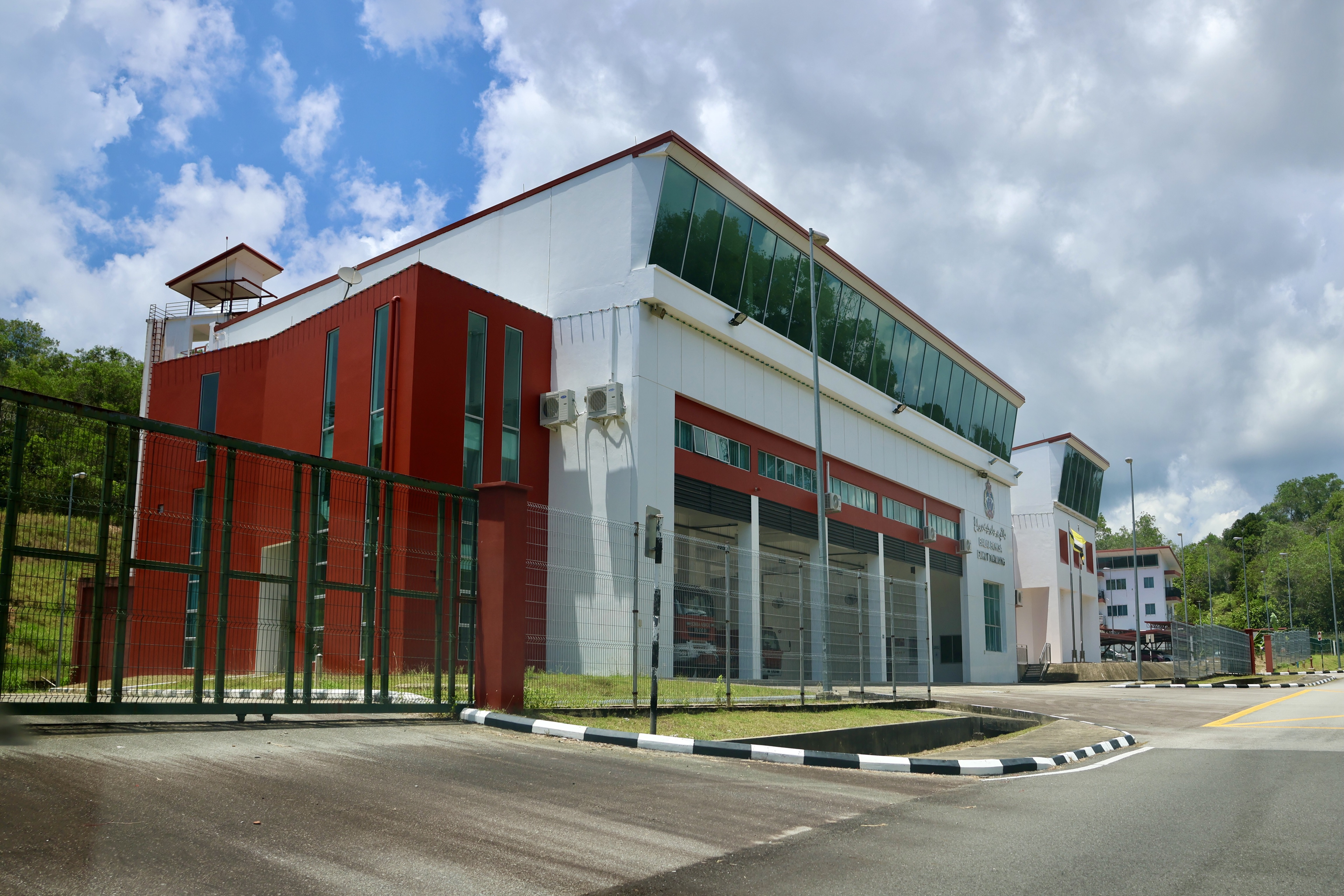
Bukit Beruang Fire Station

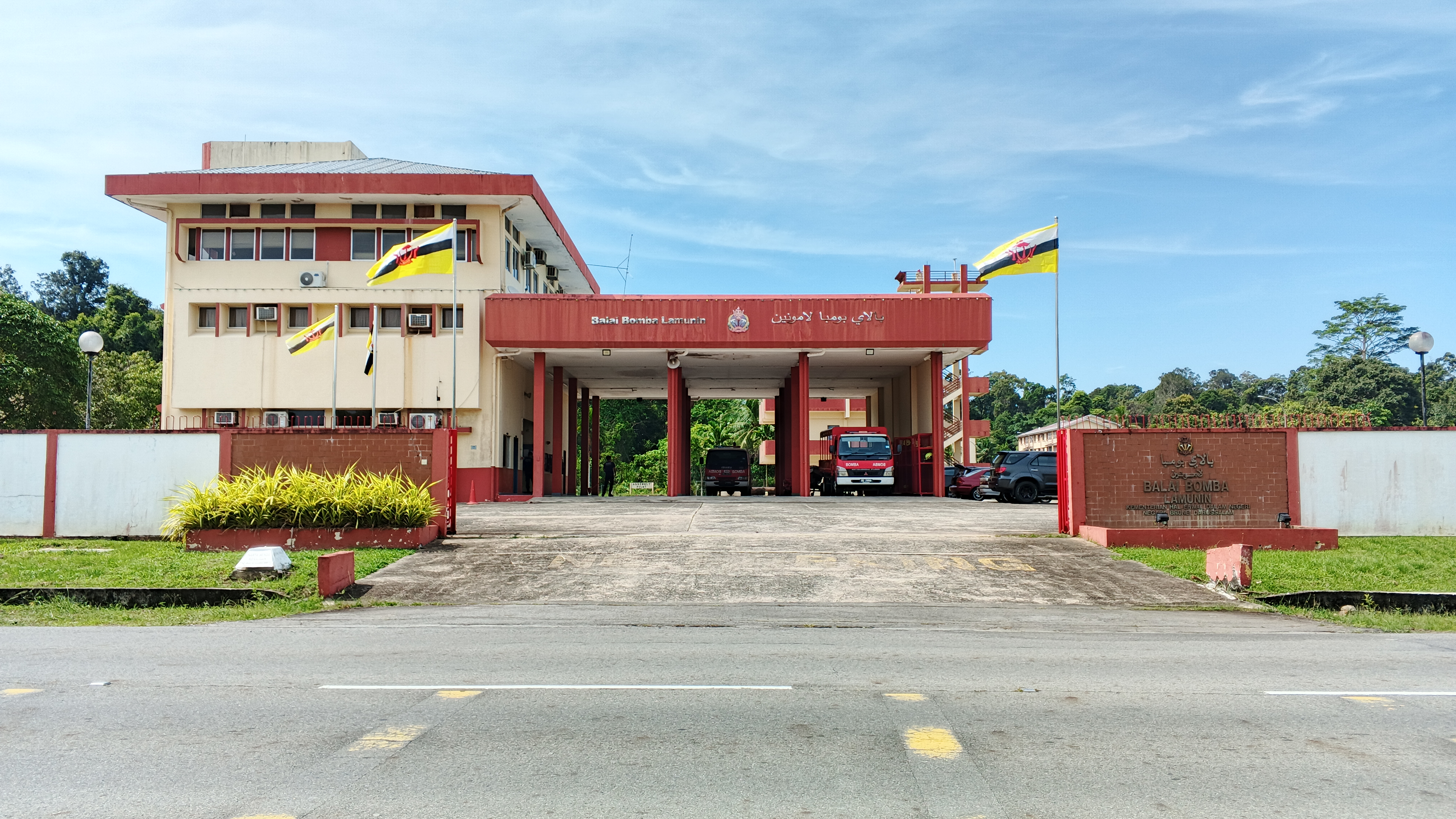
Lamunin Fire Station

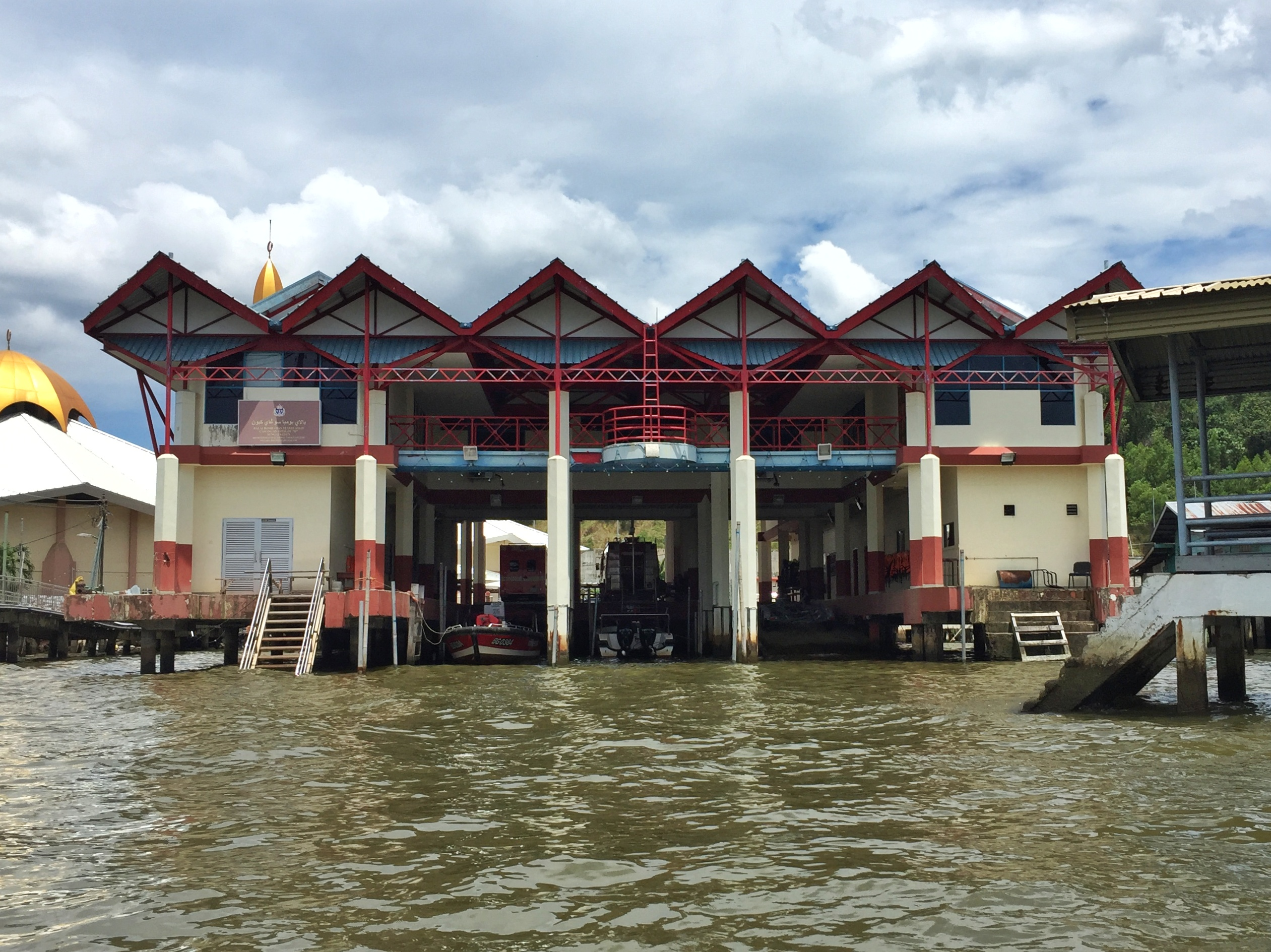
Sungai Kebun Fire Station water-side piers and fireboats

List of all fire stations (public and private) in Brunei Darussalam
Fire station name	Location	Mukim	District	Coordinates	Notes, equipment
Bangar Fire Station	Bangar	Bangar	Temburong	04°42′37″N 115°04′19″E	Operation Branch 'G'
Rataie Fire Station	Rataie	Bokok	Temburong	04°39′27″N 115°03′47″E	Operation Branch 'G'
Berakas Fire Station	Bandar Seri Begawan	Berakas 'A'	Brunei-Muara	04°55′26″N 114°55′54″E	Operation Branch 'C', Headquarters of the BFRD
Women Operations Unit Fire Station	Bandar Seri Begawan	Berakas 'A'	Brunei-Muara	04°55′31″N 114°55′58″E	Operation Branch 'C'
Berakas Garrison Fire Station	Berakas Garrison	Berakas 'A'	Brunei-Muara	04°59′51″N 114°56′30″E	Operated by the Fire and Security Services of the Logistics Department RBAF
Brunei International Airport Fire Station	Bandar Seri Begawan	Berakas 'B'	Brunei-Muara	04°56′24″N 114°55′45″E	Operated by the Royal Brunei Air Force (RBAirF), part of the air traffic control tower
Royal Brunei Air Force Fire Station	Rimba Air Force Base	Berakas 'B'	Brunei-Muara	04°56′34″N 114°55′23″E	Operated by the Fire and Security Services of the Logistics Department RBAF
Lambak Kanan Fire Station	Bandar Seri Begawan	Berakas 'B'	Brunei-Muara	04°58′21″N 114°57′54″E	Operation Branch 'C', alongside training centre
Bandar Seri Begawan Fire Station	Bandar Seri Begawan	Kianggeh	Brunei-Muara	04°53′38″N 114°56′13″E	Operation Branch 'A'
Tumasek Fire Station	Bandar Seri Begawan	Kianggeh	Brunei-Muara	04°52′35″N 114°55′28″E	Operation Branch 'F'
Rimba Fire Station	Bandar Seri Begawan	Gadong 'A'	Brunei-Muara	04°57′13″N 114°54′31″E	Operation Branch 'C'
Beribi Fire Station	Beribi	Gadong 'B'	Brunei-Muara	04°53′32″N 114°54′19″E	Operation Branch 'A', alongside workshop division
Jerudong Fire Station	Jerudong	Sengkurong	Brunei-Muara	04°55′35″N 114°50′19″E	Operation Branch 'F'
Mentiri Fire Station	Mentiri	Mentiri	Brunei-Muara	04°58′22″N 115°01′59″E	Operation Branch 'A'
Muara Fire Station	Muara	Serasa	Brunei-Muara	05°01′40″N 115°03′56″E	Operation Branch 'A'
Royal Brunei Navy Fire Station	Muara	Serasa	Brunei-Muara	05°02′08″N 115°05′09″E	Operated by the Fire and Security Services of the Logistics Department RBAF
Sungai Kebun Fire Station	Sungai Kebun	Sungai Kebun	Brunei-Muara	04°52′48″N 114°56′37″E	Operation Branch 'D'
Sungai Lampai Fire Station	Sungai Lampai	Kota Batu	Brunei-Muara	04°52′29″N 114°57′02″E	Operation Branch 'D', demolished
Pangkalan Batu Fire Station	Pangkalan Batu	Pangkalan Batu	Brunei-Muara	04°47′21″N 114°49′31″E	Operation Branch 'F'
Lamunin Fire Station	Lamunin	Lamunin	Tutong	04°40′39″N 114°42′43″E	Operation Branch 'E'
Tutong Fire Station	Tutong	Pekan Tutong	Tutong	04°48′12″N 114°39′22″E	Operation Branch 'E'
Tutong Camp Fire Station	Tutong Camp	Pekan Tutong	Tutong	04°50′01″N 114°40′27″E	Operated by the Fire and Security Services of the Logistics Department RBAF
Penanjong Fire Station	Penanjong	Pekan Tutong	Tutong	04°51′00″N 114°42′17″E	Operated by the Fire and Security Services of the Logistics Department RBAF
Bukit Beruang Fire Station	Bukit Beruang	Telisai	Tutong	04°43′55″N 114°36′26″E	Operation Branch 'E'
Anduki Airfield Fire Station	Anduki	Seria	Belait	04°38′01″N 114°22′44″E	Operated by Brunei Shell Petroleum (BSP)
Brunei Shell Petroleum Fire Station	Panaga	Seria	Belait	04°36′21″N 114°18′05″E	Operated by Brunei Shell Petroleum (BSP)
Seria Fire Station	Seria	Seria	Belait	04°36′20.6″N 114°18′05.5″E	Operation Branch 'B'
Kuala Belait Fire Station	Kuala Belait	Kuala Belait	Belait	04°34′37″N 114°12′11″E	Operation Branch 'B'
Sungai Liang Fire Station	Sungai Liang	Liang	Belait	04°42′14″N 114°31′30″E	Operation Branch 'B'
SPARK Fire Station	Sungai Liang	Liang	Belait	04°40′15″N 114°28′53″E	Operation Branch 'B'
Lumut Camp Fire Station	Lumut Camp	Liang	Belait	04°38′11″N 114°25′22″E	Operated by the Fire and Security Services of the Logistics Department RBAF
Labi Fire Station	Rampayoh	Labi	Belait	04°22′59″N 114°27′49″E	Operation Branch 'B'

== Equipment ==
=== Land vehicles ===
List of all fire vehicles operated by official government agencies (public) in Brunei Darussalam
Chassis make and model / Equipment manufacturer	Image	Type	Water capacity / Other fire suppressants	Base (no.)	Notes	ref
Bedford TK / Carmiachel		Canteen vehicle (CV)		Berakas (CV3)		
Bucher Duro		Light fire attack vehicle (LFAV)	50 litres (11 imp gal; 13 US gal)	Berakas (LFAV)		
Carmichael 4x4 / Ziegler Advancer FLF 60/50-8		Rapid intervention vehicle (RIV)	5,000 litres (1,100 imp gal; 1,321 US gal), water; 500 litres (110 imp gal; 132 US gal), foam		Operated by the RBAirF at Brunei International Airport	
Daihatsu Charmant A35/45/55		Liaison car		Berakas (BG 5696)		
Daihatsu V32B		Bus (BUS)		Berakas (BG 6202)	BG 6201 retired from service.	
Daihatsu Delta		General purpose vehicle (GPV)		Tutong (GPV4)		
Dennis DFD / McAlister		Recovery vehicle (RV)		Beribi (RV2)		
Isuzu Elf (5th gen) / SK Rosenbauer		Light pumper (LP)		Seria, Sungai Liang, Lamunin and Tutong		
Holden Commodore (VY)		Staff car				
Iveco Trakker		Breathing apparatus tender (BAT)		Berakas (BAT1)		
Iveco EuroCargo / Magirus		Water tender ladder (WRL)		Bukit Beruang		
Iveco Eurofire / Magirus		Turntable ladder (TTL)		Berakas (TTL1) and Jerudong		
Land Rover Defender TDI		Command and control vehicle (CC)				
Land Rover 90		Light pumper (LP)		Beribi (LP10)		
MAN TGM 26.320		Water tender ladder (WRL)			10 units in service since November 2025	
MAN TGS		HAZMAT tender				
MAN TGS		Foam water tender (FWT)		SPARK (FWT3)		
Mercedes-Benz Actros / SK Rosenbauer		Rapid intervention vehicle (RIV)			Operated by the RBAirF at Brunei International Airport	
Mercedes-Benz Actros / SK Rosenbauer		Water tender ladder (WRL)	7,000 litres (1,540 imp gal; 1,849 US gal)		Operated by the RBAF	
Mercedes-Benz Atego / SK Rosenbauer		Water tender ladder (WRL)	4,500 litres (990 imp gal; 1,189 US gal)	Berakas (WRL11), and Tutong		
Mercedes-Benz Axor		Water tender ladder (WRL)		Bangar (WRL34)		
Mercedes-Benz Ecoliner / SK Rosenbauer		Rapid intervention vehicle (RIV)		Beribi (RIV5)		
Mercedes-Benz Sprinter 412D / Fabristeel		Emergency tender (ET)				
Mercedes-Benz 508D / SK Rosenbauer		Emergency tender (ET)		Belait (ET8)		
Mercedes-Benz Sprinter 906 (facelift)		Emergency tender (ET)		Bandar Seri Begawan, Bukit Beruang, and Mentiri		
Mercedes-Benz Sprinter 907/910		Emergency tender (ET)		Bangar		
Mercedes-Benz 3538 / Bronto Skylift		Hydraulic platform (HP)		Tumasek (HP15)		
Mercedes-Benz Sprinter 903 / SK Rosenbauer		Accident unit (AU)		Jerudong (AU4)		
Mitsubishi Pajero		Command and control vehicle (CC)		Beribi (CC11) and Sungai Liang (CC17)		
Mitsubishi Pajero		Rescue tender (RT)		Belait		
Mitsubishi Triton L200 (2nd gen)		Multi purpose vehicle (MPV)		Belait		
Mitsubishi Triton KA/KB (4th gen)		Multi purpose vehicle (MPV)		Kuala Belait, Jerudong, and Rimba		
Mitsubishi L300		Utility (UT)				
Mitsubishi Fuso Canter (6th gen)		General purpose vehicle (GPV)		Sungai Liang and Seria		
Mitsubishi Fuso Canter (6th gen) / Fabristeel		Emergency tender (ET)		Sungai Liang		
Mitsubishi Fuso Canter (7th gen) / Fabristeel		Rescue tender (RT)		Berakas		
Mitsubishi Fuso Fighter FM / Holes		Recovery vehicle (RV)		Lambak Kanan		
Mitsubishi Fuso Fighter FM / Hi-Ab		General purpose vehicle (GPV)		Lambak Kanan		
Mitsubishi Fuso Fighter FN 617D / GHK		Water tanker (WRT)	8,000 litres (1,760 imp gal; 2,113 US gal)	Muara		
Mitsubishi Fuso FP / Morita MLK 4-30		Turntable ladder (TTL)		Seria		
Mitsubishi Fuso FP / Fabristeel		Water tanker (WRT)	15,000 litres (3,300 imp gal; 3,963 US gal)	Seria		
Mitsubishi Fuso Rosa (4th gen)		Bus (BUS)		Kuala Belait		
Mitsubishi Magna TE/KE (3rd gen)		Staff car				
Nissan Urvan E25 (5th gen)		Van		Berakas		
Scania P 310 / ISS Wawrzaszek GCBA 8/56		Water tender ladder (WRL)	8,000 litres (1,760 imp gal; 2,113 US gal)			
Simon Gloster Saro 4x4 T4500/540/225 Protector		Rapid intervention vehicle (RIV)			Operated by the RBAirF at Brunei International Airport	
Toyota Coaster U10/B10		Bus (BUS)		Berakas		
Toyota HiAce (2nd gen)		Workshop van		Beribi		
Toyota Hilux (4th gen)		Multi-purpose vehicle (MPV)		Berakas and SPARK		
Toyota Land Cruiser Prado		Command and control vehicle (CC)		Tutong		
Volvo FL7 6x4 / SK Rosenbauer		Foam water tender (FWT)	8,000 litres (1,760 imp gal; 2,113 US gal), water; plus foam and dry powder	Bandar Seri Begawan		
Volvo FL10 6x4 / SK Rosenbauer		Water tender ladder (WRL)		Berakas and Seria		
Volvo FL10 6x4 / Fabristeel		Water tender and mobile rescue unit		Berakas		
Volvo FM 6x4 / SK Rosenbauer		Foam water tender (FWT)	7,000 litres (1,540 imp gal; 1,849 US gal), water; 1,000 litres (220 imp gal; 264 US gal), foam	Bandar Seri Begawan	Operated by the RBAF	
Volvo FM10		HAZMAT tender		Berakas		
Yamaha FZ6 Fazer S2		Fire motorcycle	Hipress extinguisher	Berakas		
Suzuki GS300E		Fire motorcycle	Fire extinguisher	Berakas		

=== Marine vehicles ===
Name	Image	Type	Water capacity / Other fire suppressants	Base	Notes	ref
JBP 2		Rescue boat		Bandar Seri Begawan		
JBP 8		Rescue boat				
JBP 13		Rescue boat		Tutong		
JBP 15		Rescue boat				
JBP 16		Fire boat				
JBP 17		Rescue boat				
JBP 18		Rescue boat				
JBP 19		Fire boat	1 × high pressure pump; 3 × water detector	Sungai Lampai		
JBP 20		Fire boat	2 × high pressure pumps; 2 × water detector	Kuala Belait	Main fireboat for Belait District	
BFR 21		Rescue boat				
JBP 26		Rescue boat		Sungai Kebun		
JBP 27		Fire boat				
JBP 28		Rescue boat		Bandar Seri Begawan		
