= Fire motorcycle =

Motorcycle modified for use by a fire brigade or fire department

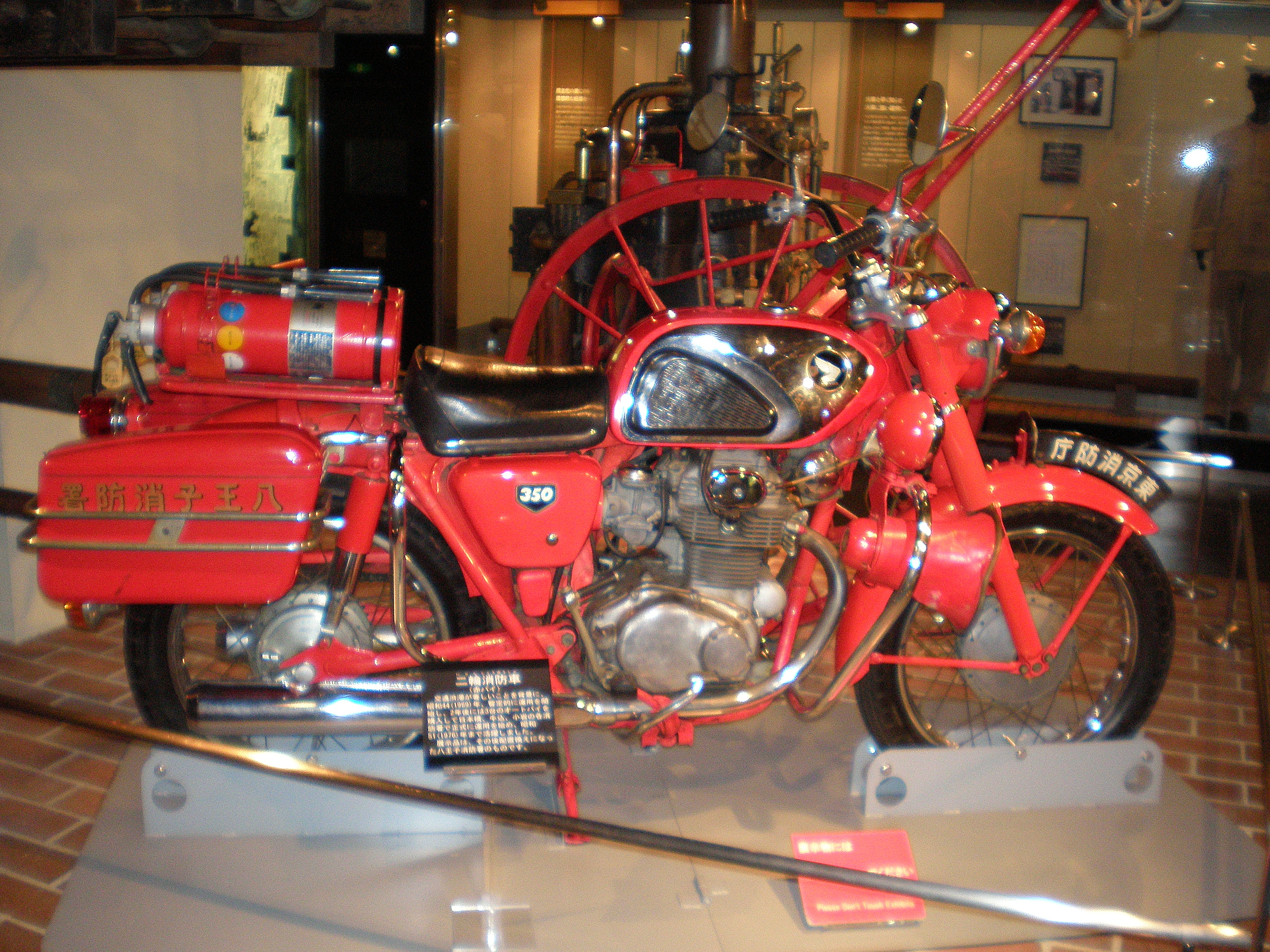
A fire motorcycle in the Tokyo Fire Museum, Japan.

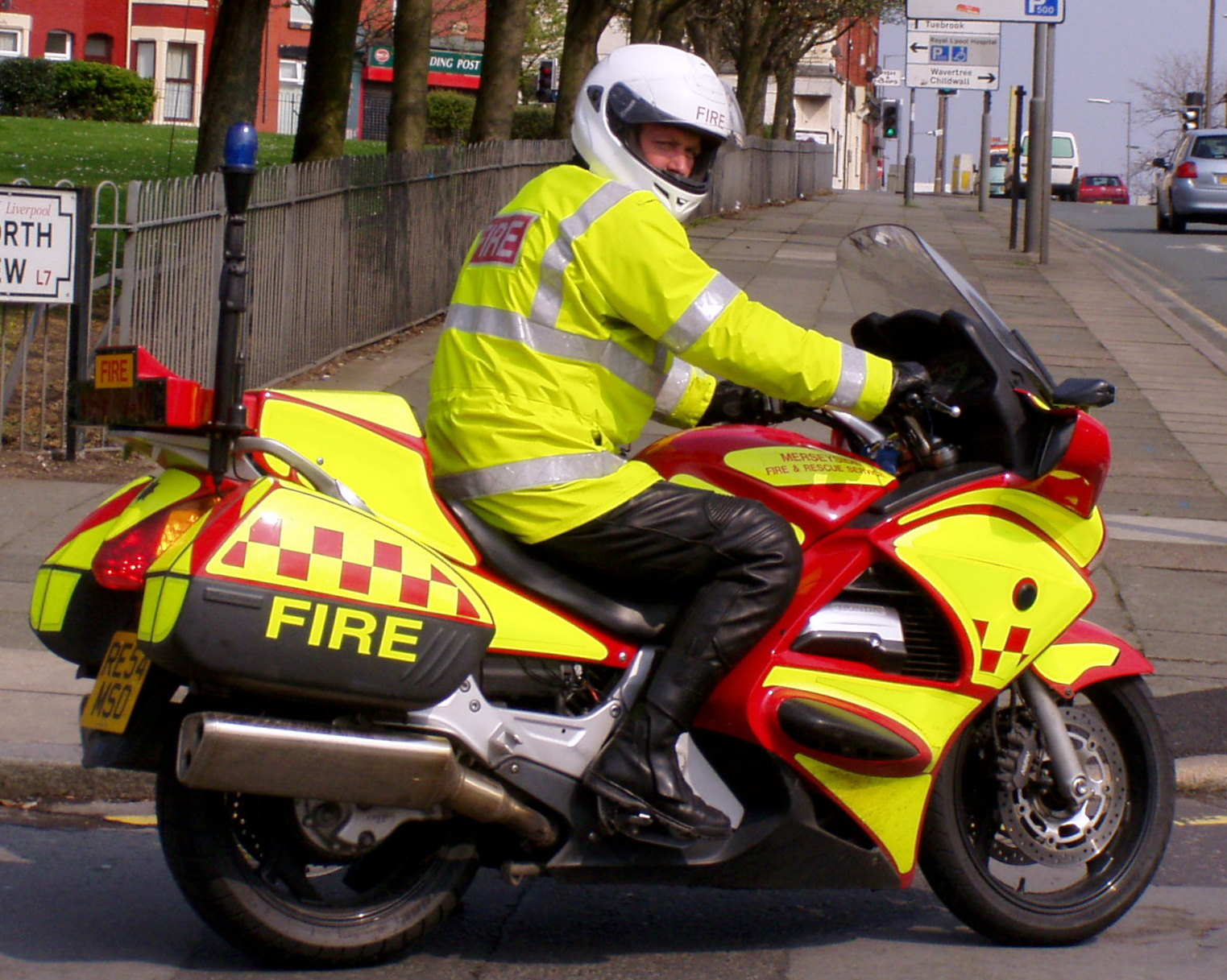
The Merseyside Fire and Rescue Service Honda ST1300 fire alarm response motorcycle.

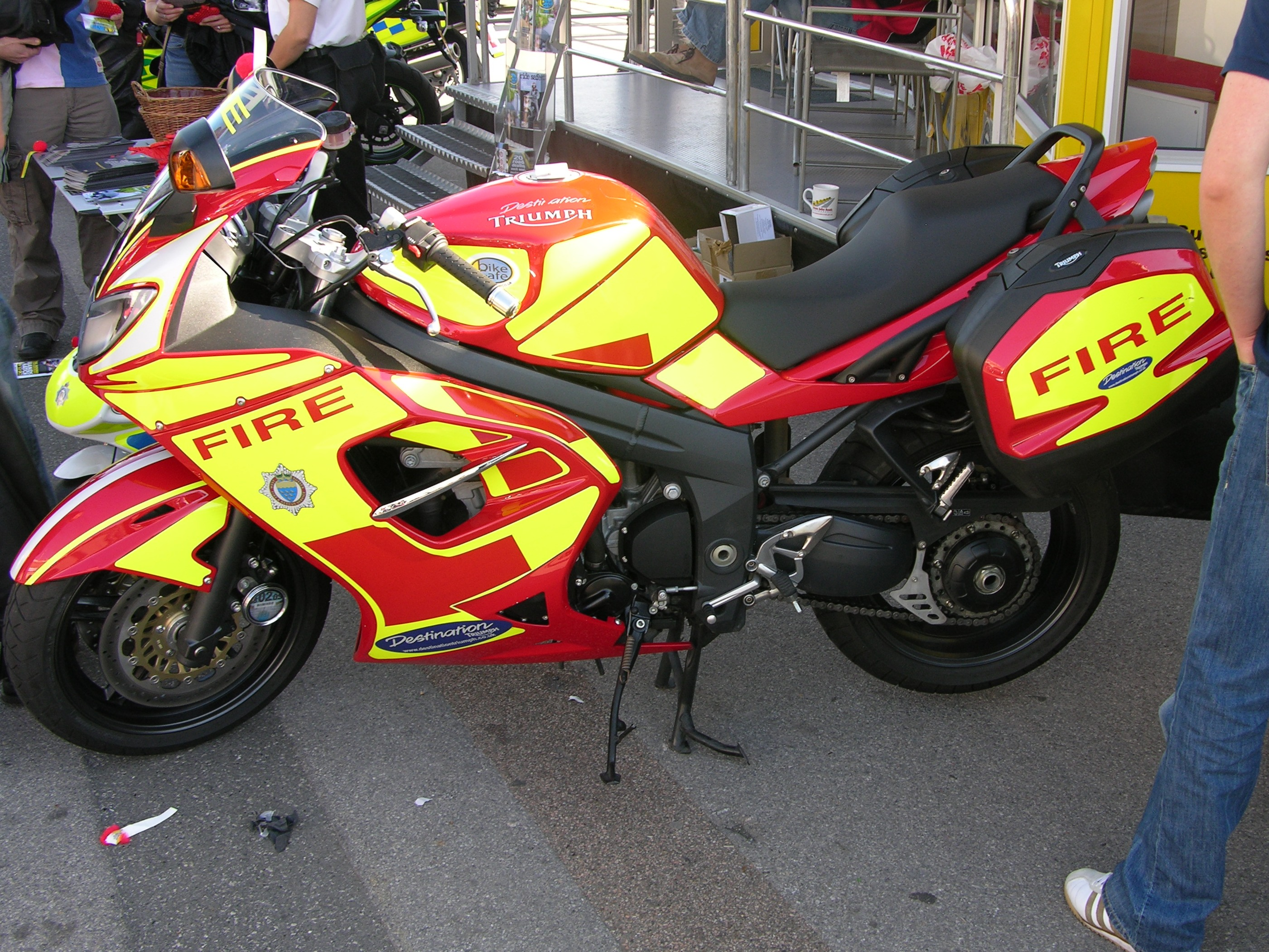
The Triumph Sprint ST 1050 fire bike of the West Sussex Fire and Rescue Service.

A fire motorcycle is a specialist motorcycle modified for use by a fire brigade or fire department. Several countries around the world use fire vehicles based on a motorcycle, often for rapid intervention to beat traffic congestion. The equipment carried ranges from simple extinguishers to jet guns with hose rigs. Firefighters may also use fire motorcycles to offer medical first aid treatment. In the United Kingdom, fire motorcycles are used by some fire services for road safety awareness campaigns.

Fire motorcycles were first used in Germany. In the 1930s in Russia, a fire pump was installed in the attached sidecar of a motorcycle. Fire motorcycles were historically used in the United Kingdom by the Auxiliary Fire Service (AFS), known models include the Matchless G3L, and were often used to provide an escort for the Green Goddess fire engines during the 1960s, a pristine surviving example now used for public relations events by Cheshire Fire and Rescue Service.

== Worldwide users ==
Fire motorcycles are used around the world.

=== Australia ===
The New South Wales Rural Fire Service (NSW RFS) uses motorcycles during wildfire operations to conduct rapid response to lightning strikes for dry fire fighting, Remote Area Firefighting Team (RAFT) operations, fire trail inspections, assessment of forward containment lines, and to act as a visual deterrent in areas of suspected serial arson in bush land. In addition to firefighting, these motorcycles are employed to assist the State Emergency Service and New South Wales Police Force in search and rescue operations throughout the state. They are commonly equipped with basic first aid kits, chainsaws, and fire extinguishers.

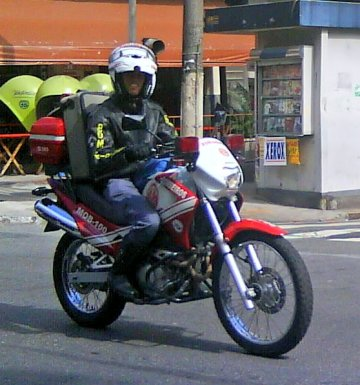
A São Paulo Fire Department motorcycle.

=== Brazil ===
The São Paulo Fire Department of Brazil use teams of two fire motorcycles to reduce first response times to fire or medical emergencies in the congested streets of São Paulo from twelve-to-fifteen minutes for conventional fire vehicles, to just five minutes. Their motorcycles are 400 cc (24 cu in) machines, and carry basic emergency medical services (EMS) equipment, tools, signalling devices, and other accessories, such as torches and elevator keys.

=== Brunei ===
Fire motorcycles are used in Brunei Darussalam by their Fire and Rescue Department; they include the Yamaha FZ6 Fazer S2 and Suzuki GS300E.

=== China ===
Beijing introduced fire motorcycle operations for Asia-Pacific Economic Cooperation (APEC) summit in 2014. China manufacture and use fire vehicles ranging from two-wheeled motorcycles (including off-road versions), four-wheeled open quad bikes, and four-wheeled quad-based covered all-terrain vehicles, along with heavy goods vehicle-based conventional fire vehicles.

==== Hong Kong ====
Fire motorcycles are used in Hong Kong. According to the Hong Kong Fire Services Department's website, "Fire Motorcycles (F.M.C.) are special fire appliances developed by Firexpress A/S in Denmark to provide rapid response and to carry out fire fighting operation". They are using BMW R1100RT as their fire motorcycles.

=== Denmark ===
Fire motorcycles have been used in Denmark.

=== Germany ===
Some municipal fire departments in Germany (Feuerwehr) use motorcycles for reconnaissance, courier duties, and traffic control. Models include the BMW R1150RT (70 kilowatts; 94 brake horsepower (95 metric horsepower)), the BMW F650GS, and the Yamaha TW125 (9 kilowatts (12 metric horsepower; 12 brake horsepower)). However, motorbikes are not part of the national Deutsches Institut für Normung (DIN) standards for fire apparatus; if their purchase by a municipal department will be subsidised with state funds depends on local laws.

=== Greece ===
Fire motorcycles are used in Greece.

=== Iran ===
Iran National Fire Department uses two models of Honda motorcycle (CBX750 and CMX250C) in Tehran, and some models of Hyosung motorcycles in other metropolises of Iran.

=== Italy ===
Fire motorcycles have been used in Italy, but has since been replaced.

Japan

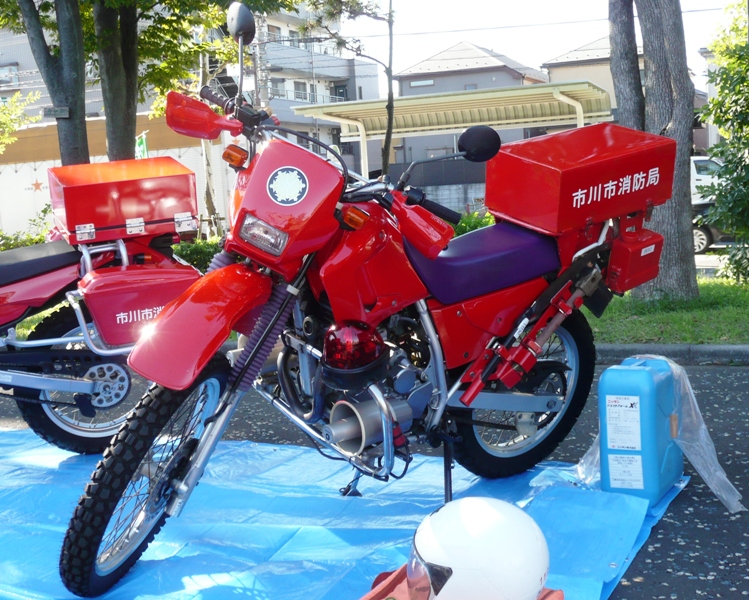
Ichikawa Fire Department Ambulance / Fire Honda XR motorcycle.

In Japan, the Tokyo Fire Department uses pairs of motorcycle units nicknamed 'Quick Attackers' for fire-fighting, rescue, and medical first aid treatment. The units comprise two different types of 200 cc (12 cu in) motorcycles operating in an off-road capable environment: a type 'T' unit is equipped with a portable impulse fire extinguishing system, while a type 'U' unit carries simple rescue equipment and fire extinguishers. As of 2001, twenty Quick Attacker teams were in service. With Japan having a long history of earthquakes, Quick Attacker units are capable of off-road response, and are also used for rapid fact-finding in earthquake and other disaster zones.

=== Kazakhstan ===
The first four 'Jawa' fire motorcycles in Almaty were presented in November 2016. They are Jawa 660 cc (40 cu in) single cylinder motorcycles which produce 48 horsepower (36 kilowatts; 49 metric horsepower) and weigh 198 kilograms (437 pounds), and are capable of reaching 170 kilometres per hour (110 miles per hour).

=== Malaysia ===
The Royal Malaysian Fire and Rescue Department and the Royal Malaysian Civil Defence Force in order to combat increasing traffic congestion which delays ordinary fire appliances, with response time being a critical factor in preventing the spread of fires in the high-rise residential blocks. The force operates fire motorcycle teams composed of three junior officers. They are usually the first to arrive at the scene of a fire or an incident, and if necessary, will enter a premises to fight or prevent the spread of a fire. The riders are equipped with impulse guns, which can fire powerful bursts of water mist at speeds of up to 200 metres per second (660 feet per second).

=== Nepal ===
Fire motorcycles modified with 75-kilogram (165-pound) fire extinguishers and emergency siren are in use in Kathmandu, the capital city of Nepal. They are able to reach "every nooks and corners of the city, even up to the doorsteps of the houses that catch fire", and are in part funded by a 'fire tax' levied by Kathmandu Metropolitan City (KMC).

=== Russia ===
Fire motorcycles have been used in Russia.

=== Singapore ===
The Singapore Civil Defence Force (SCDF) introduced fire motorcycles in 1998, in order to combat increasing traffic congestion which delays conventional fire appliances, with response time being a critical factor in preventing the spread of fires in the high-rise residential blocks of the urban island city state. The force operates fire motorcycle teams composed of two junior officers. They are usually the first to arrive at the scene of a fire, and if necessary, will enter a premises (with force if necessary) to fight or prevent the spread of a fire. The riders are equipped with impulse guns, which can fire powerful bursts of water mist at speeds of up to 200 metres per second (660 feet per second). The motorcycle model used in the force is the Honda CB400 Spec 3.

=== Sweden ===
Fire motorcycles were previously used in Sweden, but they are no longer in current use.

=== Turkey ===
Fire motorcycles are used in Turkey.

=== Taiwan ===
Fire motorcycles are used for tunnel fires in Taiwan.

=== United Arab Emirates ===
Fire motorcycles are used in the United Arab Emirates.

=== United Kingdom ===
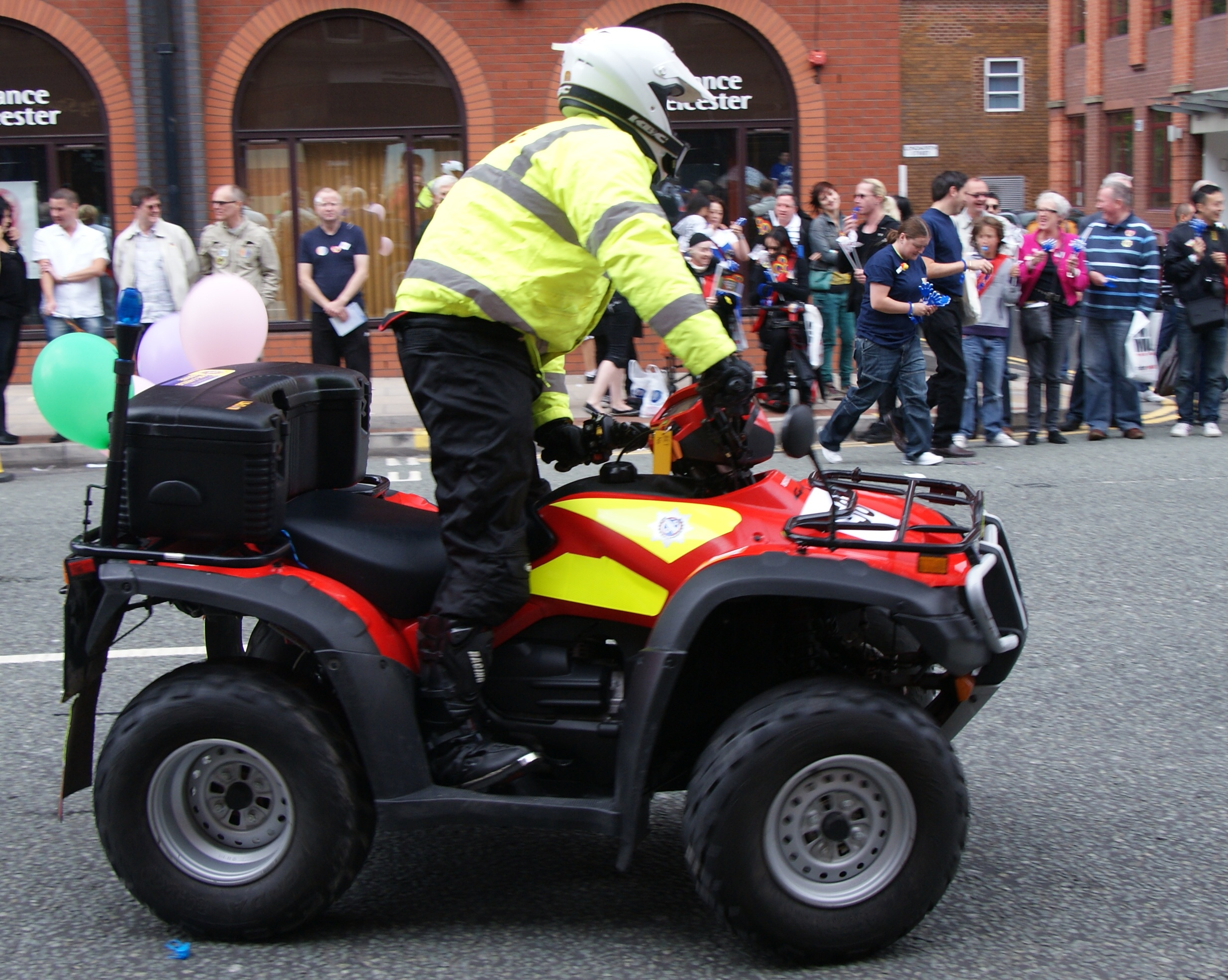
The Merseyside Fire and Rescue Service quad bike

In the United Kingdom, the Merseyside Fire and Rescue Service has operated a number of fire motorcycles in different roles since 2005. In July 2010, they became the first fire service in the UK to deploy fire motorcycles specially equipped to fight fires. The two BMW R1200RT trial bikes are fitted with two 25-litre (5.5-imperial-gallon; 6.6-US-gallon) canisters filled with water and foam and a high powered 30-metre (100-foot) long jet hose. They are to be used to combat small fires, and to free up main fire appliances. They were to undergo a six-month trial, with the prospect of being adopted by other forces if found to be effective. Since 2005, Merseyside had been using a fire motorcycle to attend automated fire alarm calls in Liverpool to assess situations ahead of the arrival of main appliances, due to rising traffic congestion, and because most of these automated calls are false alarms. In 2007, Merseyside also introduced two Honda quad-bikes for fire safety awareness campaigns, and possibly for operational use to fight woodland or grass fires.

A number of other UK fire services also operate fire motorcycles; not to fight fires or aid fire response times, but instead to promote safe motorcycle riding. Motorcycles are operated in this role by the fire services of Devon and Somerset, East Sussex, West Sussex, North Wales, Kent, and Northumberland. The Northumberland fire motorcycle was later fitted with an external automatic defibrillator and trauma care kit allowing it to also be used as a response vehicle for road traffic accidents.

=== United States of America ===
Fire motorcycles are very uncommon in the United States of America. The Daytona Beach Fire Department has had a Motor Medic team in continuous operation since 1994. In September 2012, the Los Angeles City Fire Department started a trial run studying the use of a motorcycle response team for brush fires, and to aid during times of heavy congestion. Other areas in the US, including Miami-Dade, New York, Seattle, Lansing, Michigan, have explored the use of alternative vehicles for EMS response, specifically bicycles, quad bikes, and electric carts.

== See also ==
- Commons:Category:Fire bicycles
- Blood bike
- Motorcycle ambulance
- Police motorcycle
