= Finding water =

Finding water may refer to multiple techniques:

- Hydrology and hydrogeology, which study the movement and distribution of water in nature
- Use of a water detector, in a building
- Dowsing, a pseudo-scientific method
- Gamma ray spectrometry, a method of finding extraterrestrial water
