= Suzuki GS1100 =

Suzuki GS1100 (GS1100 L below)
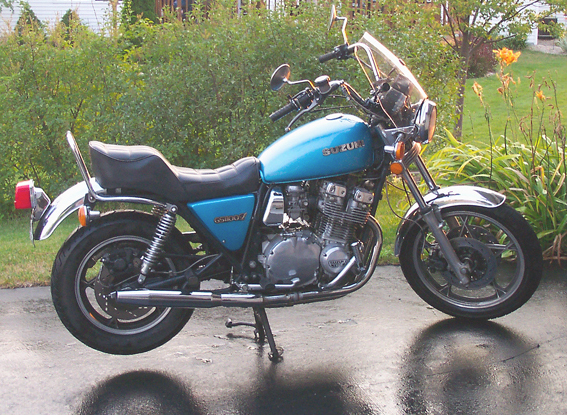
- Manufacturer: Suzuki
- Class: Standard
- Engine: 1,075 cc (65.6 cu in) DOHC inline-four
- Bore / stroke: 72 mm × 66 mm (2.8 in × 2.6 in)
- Compression ratio: 9.5:1
- Top speed: 134 mph (216 km/h)
- Power: 105 bhp (78 kW) @ 8,500 rpm (claimed)
- Torque: 67.6 ft⋅lb (91.7 J) @ 6,500 rpm (claimed)
- Ignition type: CDI
- Transmission: Wet multi-plate clutch, 5-speed, chain drive
- Suspension: Front: telescopic fork Rear: Swingarm 2×shocks adj. damping
- Brakes: Front: 2×280 mm (11 in) disc Rear: 280 mm (11 in) disc
- Tires: Bridgestone, Front: 3.5-V19; Rear: 4.5-V17
- Rake, trail: 28°, 103 mm (4.06 in)
- Wheelbase: 1,540 mm (60.5 in)
- Dimensions: W: 800 mm (31.5 in)
- Seat height: 800 mm (31.5 in)
- Weight: 252 kg (556 lb) (tank 1/2 full) (wet)
- Fuel capacity: 18 L; 3.9 imp gal (4.7 US gal)
- Fuel consumption: 4.96 L/100 km; 56.9 mpg_{‑imp} (47.4 mpg_{‑US})

The Suzuki GS1100 is a Suzuki GS series motorcycle introduced in 1980. It was a direct descendant of the Suzuki GS750. The engine size increased from 1000 to 1100 cc. Upon its introduction it received accolades. The 1980 had a 1/4 mile time of 11.39 seconds at 118.42 mph (190.58 km/h) and a 0 to 60 mph time of 4.3 seconds.

== Specifications ==
- Four valves per cylinder
- Double overhead cam
- Electronic ignition
- Five-speed transmission
- Box-section aluminum swingarm
- Anti-dive forks (from 1982)
- Triple disc brakes

== Recognition ==
Cycle World's Superbike of the Year for three consecutive years from 1981 to 1983.

Cycle Guide said in March 1978, "Technologically, the GS1000 is a landmark motorcycle. It represents the first time … that an existing Japanese motorcycle has been successfully re-engineered with two important factors uppermost on the priority sheet: handling and light weight."

In 1999 Rider magazine ranked the GS1100E fifth on its list of the most significant bikes of the last 35 years.
