= Fire chief =

Top executive rank or commanding officer in a fire department

Fire Chief
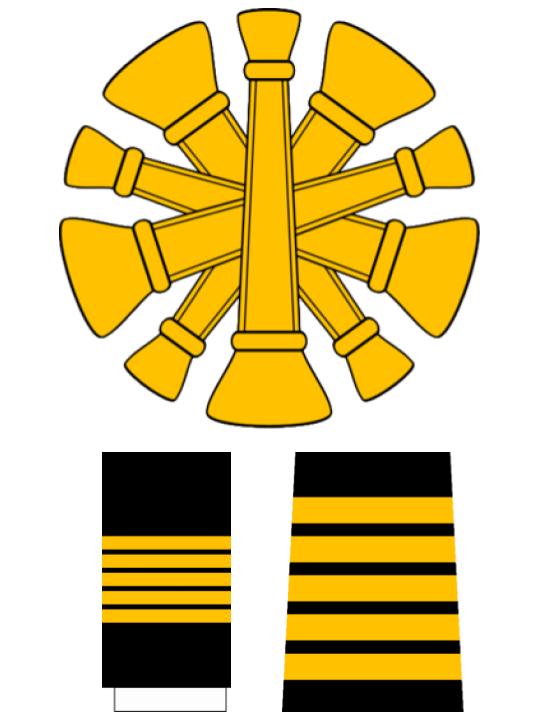
- Typical collar insignia, dress sleeve, and shoulder boards of a fire chief
- Abbreviation: CF
- Rank: Fire Chief, Fire Commissioner, or Chief of Department
- Next lower rank: Assistant or Deputy Chief
- Equivalent ranks: Chief Fire Officer (United Kingdom)

A fire chief (or fire commissioner in some jurisdictions) is a top executive rank or commanding officer in a fire department. Fire chiefs may have varying administrative and operational responsibilities depending on the size of their department. In smaller departments, the fire chief may take on an integral role in operations as the incident commander. In many large departments, a fire chief typically serves a more administrative role, and supervises other lower-ranked chiefs who are entrusted to operationally command most incidents.

A fire chief will typically respond to incidents in their own specialized command vehicle as opposed to standard fire apparatus. Depending on their jurisdiction, they may be elected or appointed to their position.

== Nomenclature ==
Various official English-language titles for a fire chief include fire chief, chief fire officer and fire commissioner. The latter can refer to a fire chief or to an overseer who works for the local government. "Chief fire officer" is the usual title in the United Kingdom. Traditionally, a fire chief in Scotland was known as a "fire master", but this was changed in 2006.

The definition of the term fire officer varies by country, but generally refers to all firefighting personnel who have some command duties. This is comparable to the usage of "officer" in the military, rather than the term police officer. In fire departments of the United States, fire officers who are part of an engine company or other unit (lieutenants and captains) are company officers and those ranked higher (e.g. battalion chiefs) are chief officers.

== Appointment ==
A fire chief is usually appointed by the authority who oversees the running of the fire department, such as the mayor for a municipal fire department.

It varies among countries as to whether it is the norm or not for fire chiefs to be former frontline firefighters. This is the case in the United States. It is also the norm in the United Kingdom, though in recent years there have been exceptions. By contrast, in France, fire officers and frontline firefighters are recruited separately in a similar way to the military.

== Duties and functions ==
A fire chief's role varies considerably depending on the size of the department. Some countries have a single national fire service, such as Israel, New Zealand, and the Philippines. Conversely, some countries, like the United States and Germany, have autonomous fire departments even in small towns. Others organize their fire services based on subdivisions such as regions, counties, provinces or sub-national states.

The larger the fire department, the more ranks will exist in between the chief and regular firefighters, such as assistants or deputy chiefs. The chief of a small volunteer fire department is likely to be the main incident commander for the majority of their call-outs and is nearly always a volunteer as well. However, the chief of a large fire department is employed in a mostly administrative role, and will only be called out to the largest incidents.

=== Administrative ===
The fire chief is responsible for carrying out the day-to-day tasks of running a firefighting organization. Such tasks include supervising other officers and firefighters at an emergency scene and recruiting, training, and equipping them for their respective duties. Depending upon local needs and organization, the chief may also be involved in fire prevention, fire inspection, disaster preparedness, emergency medical services, and related disciplines, as well as administrative duties such as budgets and personnel issues, research into safety and regulations, and liaison with other agencies. The chief is answerable to the local or national government that oversees the fire service. As well as the position of chief of scheduling.

=== Incident command ===
During an emergency incident, the first fire officer on the scene must "establish command", which can then be transferred to more senior officers such as the chief. The chief may delegate some statutory powers to qualified officers, such as the ability to enter or use private property as reasonably necessary to stop a fire, or to order people or property seized as may be essential to preserving safety or investigating the cause of an incident.

A fire chief's vehicle is not only a means of transport, but can act as an incident command post and a contact point for media reporters.

== See also ==
- Chief justice
- Chief of police
- Deputy governor
- Deputy president
- Deputy prime minister
- Firefighting
- Government
- Governor
- Incident commander
- President
- Prime minister
