= Suzuki GS400E =

Suzuki motorcycle

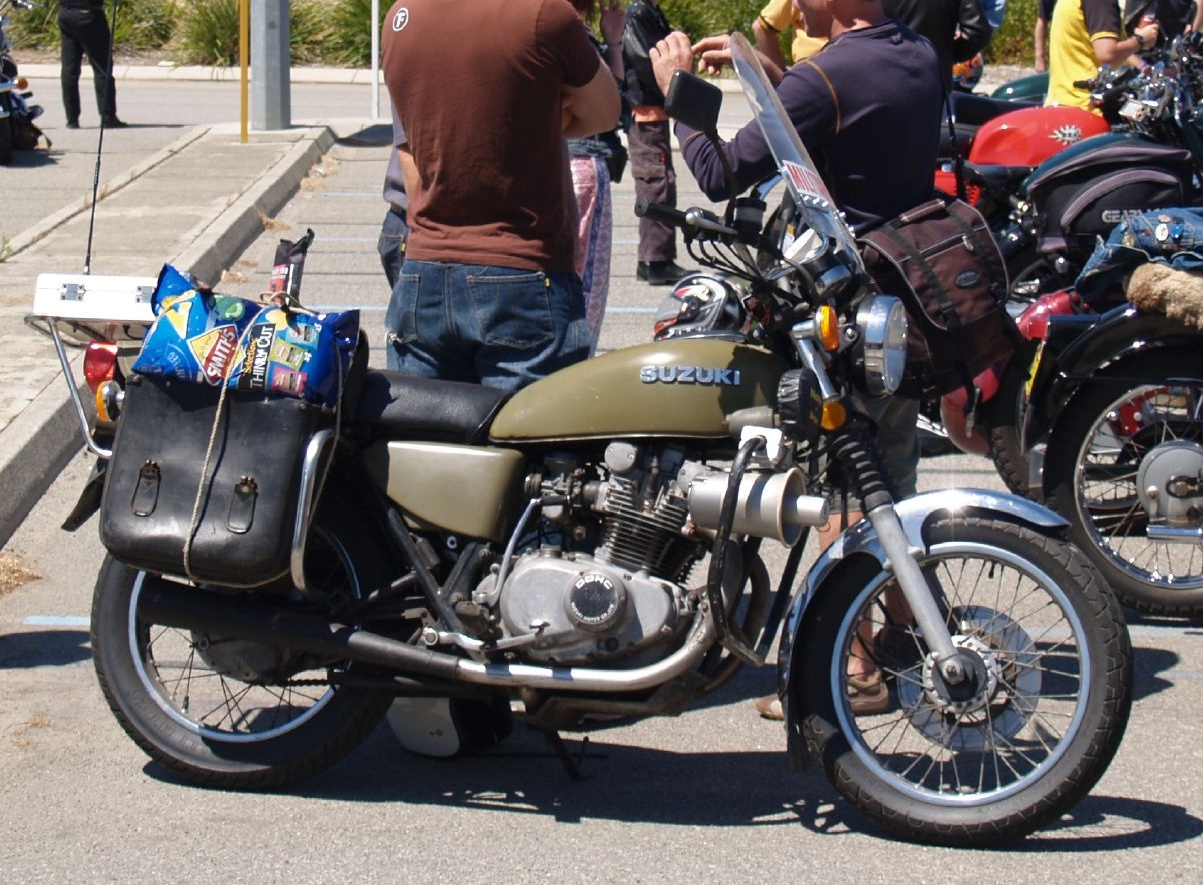
Suzuki GS400E

The Suzuki GS400E is a motorcycle that was part of the Suzuki GS series in production between 1978 and 1984.

== Engine ==
The engine was a 398 cc 4-stroke parallel twin plant that featured double over-head camshafts with two valves per cylinder. The claimed output of the engine is 34 bhp (25 kW) at 8000 rpm and 2.94 kg.m of torque at 7000 rpm.

== Gearbox ==
The gearbox is of unit construction with the engine and consists of a constant mesh 6-speed transmission with a multi-plate wet clutch and a chain drive.
