= Suzuki GS500 =

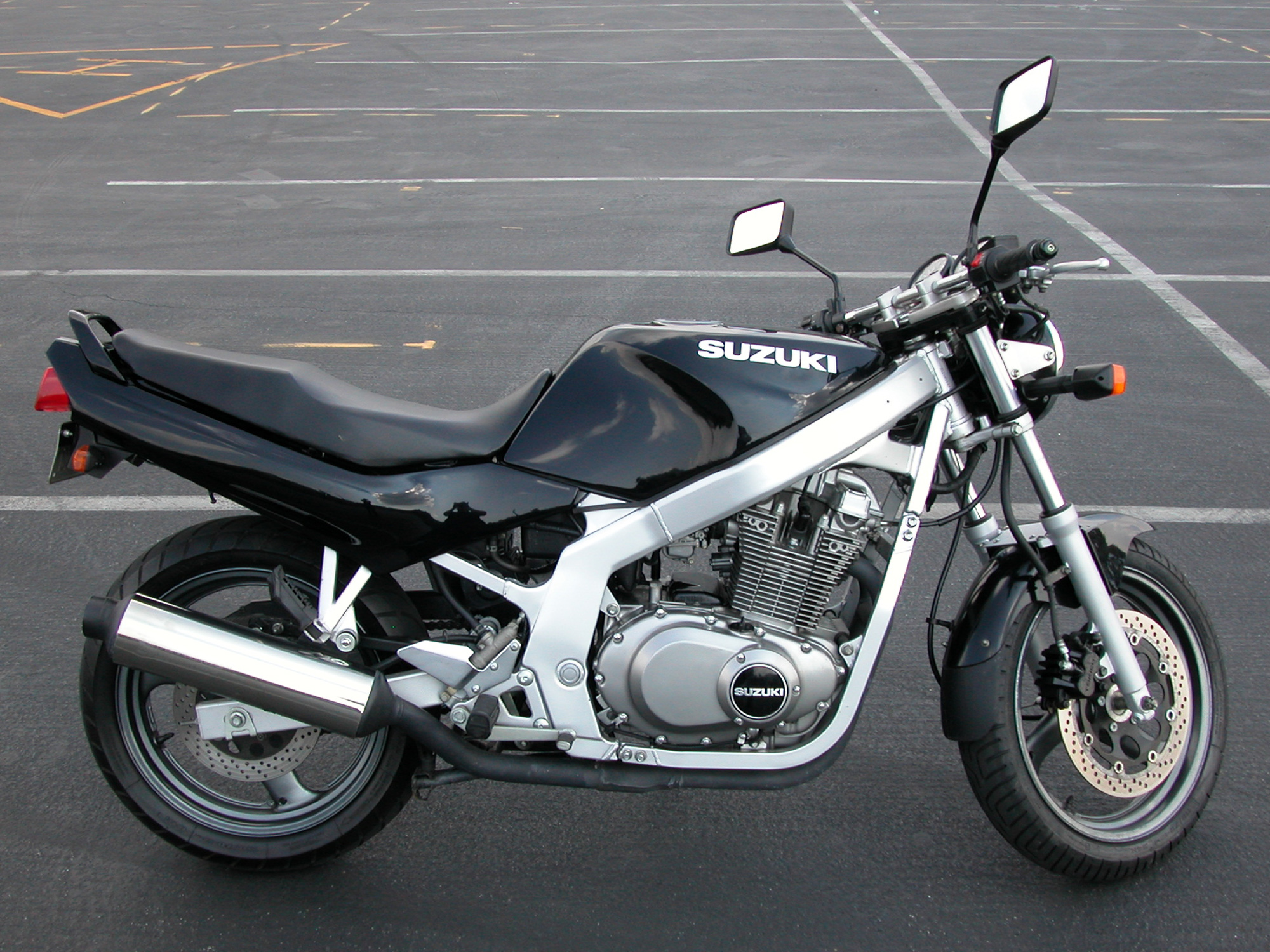
- 1997 Suzuki GS500E
- Manufacturer: Suzuki Motor Corporation
- Also called: GS500E; GS500F
- Production: 1989–2012 (GS500 / GS500E); 2004–2013 (GS500F)
- Assembly: Japan 1988-2003; Gijón, Spain 2004-2013; Pereira, Colombia 2014—
- Predecessor: Suzuki GS450
- Class: Naked bike (GS500 / GS500E); Lightweight Sport bike (GS500F)
- Engine: 487 cc (29.7 cu in), 4-stroke, air‑cooled parallel twin, DOHC, 2 valves per cylinder
- Bore / stroke: 74.0 mm × 56.6 mm (2.91 in × 2.23 in)
- Compression ratio: 9.0 : 1
- Top speed: 159 km/h (99 mph); 169 km/h (105 mph)
- Power: 52 hp (39 kW) @ 9500 rpm (claimed); 33.5–47 hp (25.0–35.0 kW) (rear wheel)
- Torque: 30.4 lb⋅ft (41.2 N⋅m) @ 7500 rpm (claimed); 25.6–26.7 lb⋅ft (34.7–36.2 N⋅m) (rear wheel)
- Ignition type: Transistorized electronic ignition
- Transmission: 6-speed
- Frame type: Duplex cradle
- Suspension: F: Telescopic, spring preload adjustable R: Link type, spring preload adjustable
- Brakes: F: Disc, twin-piston caliper R: Disc, single-piston caliper
- Tires: F: 110/70-17, R: 130/70-17
- Rake, trail: 25° 30′, 95 mm (3.7 in)
- Wheelbase: 1,405 mm (55.3 in)
- Dimensions: L: 2,080 mm (82 in); W: 800 mm (31 in); H: 1,060 mm (42 in) (GS500), 1,150 mm (45 in) (GS500F)
- Seat height: 790 mm (31 in)
- Weight: 169 kg (373 lb) (GS500E); 174 kg (384 lb) (GS500); 180 kg (400 lb) 184 kg (405 lb) (GS500F) (dry); 193 kg (425 lb) (GS500); 199 kg (439 lb) 201 kg (443 lb) (GS500F) (wet)
- Fuel capacity: 17.0 L (3.7 imp gal; 4.5 US gal); 20.0 L (4.4 imp gal; 5.3 US gal) (2001—)
- Fuel consumption: 56.3 mpg_{‑US} (4.18 L/100 km; 67.6 mpg_{‑imp})

Suzuki GS500E Four
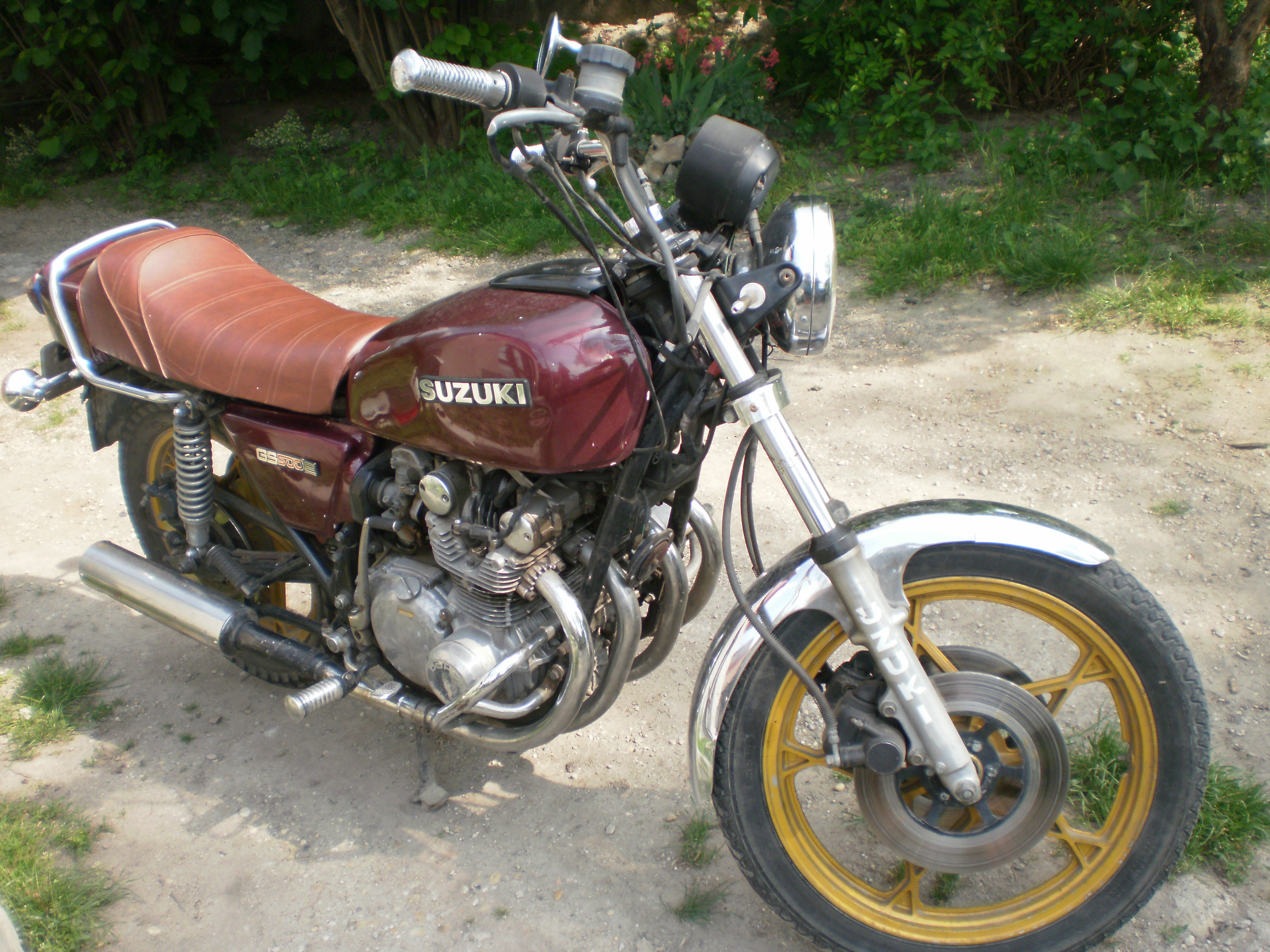
- Inline-four engine GS500E model
- Manufacturer: Suzuki
- Production: 1979-1982
- Class: Standard
- Engine: 492 cc (30.0 cu in), 4-stroke, 4-cylinder, air-cooled, DOHC 2 valves per cylinder
- Bore / stroke: 53.0 mm × 55.8 mm (2.09 in × 2.20 in)
- Compression ratio: 8.5 : 1
- Transmission: 6-speed constant mesh
- Brakes: F: Dual disk R: single disk
- Tires: F: 3.25-19 R: 3.75-18
- Wheelbase: 1,435 mm (56.5 in)
- Dimensions: L: 2,200 mm (87 in); W: 850 mm (33 in); H: 1,155 mm (45.5 in)
- Seat height: 835 mm (32.9 in)
- Fuel capacity: 17.0 L (3.7 imp gal; 4.5 US gal)
- Related: GS550

The Suzuki GS500 is an entry-level motorcycle manufactured and marketed by the Suzuki Motor Corporation. Suzuki produced the GS500 and GS500E from 1989 on and the fully faired model, GS500F from 2004 on. The GS500 is currently being produced and sold in South America. The GS500 has been described in the motorcycle literature as a best buy and an excellent first bike, with adequate if not exciting power for more experienced riders (approximately 40 HP at the rear wheel).

The unfaired version of the GS500 was first sold in the UK in 1988 (model code GS500EJ) and the following year's model (code GS500EK) was released for sale in Europe and North America. It was equipped with an air-cooled parallel twin-cylinder engine derived from the earlier GS450. In the motorcycle market, the GS500 occupied the low end of Suzuki's mid-sized range for over twenty years.

Suzuki also produced GS500 models, identified by a 'U' suffix, with engines restricted to satisfy the maximum power-to-weight ratio for use in countries where restrictive motorcycle licenses were issued (the GS500 meets current EU and UK licence level A2 conditions without restricting the engine) or for countries with a Learner Approved Motorcycle program (such as Australia and New Zealand) enhancing its worldwide popularity.

== Model history ==
GS500 engineering lineage descends directly from Suzuki's first modern 4-stroke motorcycles. With the 1976 debut of the GS750 air-cooled inline-four, as well as the GS400 parallel-twin, Suzuki was building 4-stroke engines despite having produced only 2-stroke motors for 20 years. The Suzuki GS series soon expanded into larger and smaller four-cylinder bikes, the GS1000 and GS550 respectively, while the twin-cylinder engine was bored-out to become the GS425 twin. All of these models preserved the earliest GS engine layout: double overhead cams, 2 shim-adjusted valves per cylinder and a roller-bearing crankshaft.

=== GS500E inline four 1979-1982 ===
The GS500E motorcycle appeared in 1979, powered by a sleeved-down version of the GS550 engine (with smaller carburetors). The GS500E four was manufactured for markets where its smaller displacement was suited to insurance or license regulations.

=== GS500E parallel twin 1988-2000 ===
Suzuki modified the original GS series engine layout to produce a successor to the GS425, the GS450 twin, which had a new bottom-end design that used a one-piece 180° crankshaft running on plain bearings. A counterbalance shaft controlled engine vibrations. The 448 cubic centimetres (27.3 cu in) displacement of this twin grew to 487 cubic centimetres (29.7 cu in) in 1988 by means of a 3 mm larger bore, when it became the engine for the new GS500E.

Although the GS500E twin was developed from an existing design, for the 1988 GS500EJ model Suzuki came up with a brand new frame, running gear and bodywork aimed at urban riders, novice motorcyclists and those on a budget. Additionally, the GS500EJ debuted with carburetors from the Mikuni ‘Slingshot’ series, a design which was simultaneously being used on the Suzuki GSX-R750 racer-replica. Although it did not produce as much horsepower as comparable multivalve engines, the two-valve GS500 engine had proportionally more torque at low speeds.

As introduced in 1988 for the UK, and the GS500EK model in 1989 for Europe and North America, the bike came with a black painted engine mounted in a light grey frame and white wheels. These first GS500 bikes had low two-piece handlebars, giving the impression of clip-ons but were in fact mounted to the upper triple tree. In 1990 the handlebars were raised to a more standard height. A California-specific model for 1990 had a reduced fuel capacity, 15.0 liters (3.3 imp gal; 4.0 U.S. gal) instead of 17 liters, to allow room under the tank for an evaporation canister.

The GS500EN (1992) front suspension was improved by fitting spring preload adjusters to the forks. The painted wheels were changed in 1996 from the original white color to dark grey, and the frame on some models. The engine was no longer painted black.

New front brake calipers for the GS500EV in 1997 had two large pistons, replacing the previous unequally-sized pistons. Starting in 1998 (GS500EW) French models were fitted with Mikuni BSR 34mm carburetors with a three-circuit design (pilot jet, mid-main jet, main jet) for precise fuel metering throughout the rev range.

=== GS500 2001—2016 ===
In 2001 the GS500 was given new bodywork and a 20-liter fuel tank. Wheel rims were painted light gray. All markets got the Mikuni BSR 34mm carburetors that had been used only on French models. Pulsed secondary air injection was used to reduce emissions. In addition to dropping the 'E' designation for the GS500, all Suzuki motorcycles went from using a single letter code for the model year (e.g., 'X' for 1999) to a letter-and-number code: K1 for 2001, K2 for 2002, L0 for 2010 and so on. In 2002 the wheel color became black, and from 2004 the frame was also painted black.

After 2002 Suzuki stopped producing the GS500E for the US market and did not release a GS500 for 2003. In 2007, Suzuki dropped the GS500 from its lineup in the UK and Spain, but it continued to be sold in some other countries.

As of 2016, Suzuki Motor Corporation is producing the GS500 at its Latin American manufacturing subsidiary Suzuki Motor de Colombia S.A. for sale in Colombia and for export to Chile (where it is marketed as a retro model) as well as to Ecuador.

=== GS500F 2004-2013 ===
In 2004, after a year hiatus, Suzuki came out with the GS500F to fill the void left (in the US market) by the GS500. In other countries the two models were sold side by side. This bike was very similar to the previous model, but came with a fully enclosed fairing, and the engine could be restricted for use in countries where restrictive motorcycle licenses are issued. The fairing offered a sportier, aggressive look and improved rider comfort by providing wind protection and better aerodynamics. An engine oil cooler was also added to improve reliability, and European models used a catalytic converter as well as pulsed secondary air injection to control emissions. The GS500F was dropped from the UK Suzuki range in 2007 and from the US range after 2009 model year, but was still available in Australia and Denmark.

In January 2015 Cycle World added the GS500F to its roll of Best Used Bikes.

== Comparative reviews ==
In March 1992, Motorcyclist magazine, in an article titled "Budget Bullets," compared the Kawasaki EX500, the Yamaha Seca II, the Honda Nighthawk CB750, and the Suzuki GS500. The Seca II came in first, with the CB750, and the GS500 following in that order.

In a February 1992 article titled "Bargain Blasters," Cycle World compared the GS500E to the Kawasaki EX500, the Seca II and the Suzuki Bandit GSF400. The GS500E finished last because it was relatively underpowered, but the testers praised its handling. In April 1994, in a follow-up article titled "Bargain Hunters," Cycle World compared the Kawasaki Ninja 500R (the EX500 renamed), the Yamaha FZR600 and Seca II, in addition to the Suzuki Katana 600 and GS500E, choosing the Ninja as the best deal overall.

The GS500E fared better as part of a 2002 Cycle World comparison of ten mid-sized streetbikes, which included the Royal Enfield Bullet Silver Classic 500 ES, Buell Blast, Suzuki LS650 Savage, Kawasaki KLR650 and MZ Skorpion Tour single-cylinder bikes, as well as the Kawasaki Vulcan 500 LTD, Honda VLX, Yamaha V-Star Custom and Kawasaki Ninja 500R twins. The GS500E narrowly beat the Ninja 500R for top honors "on the grounds of its $700 lower price tag."

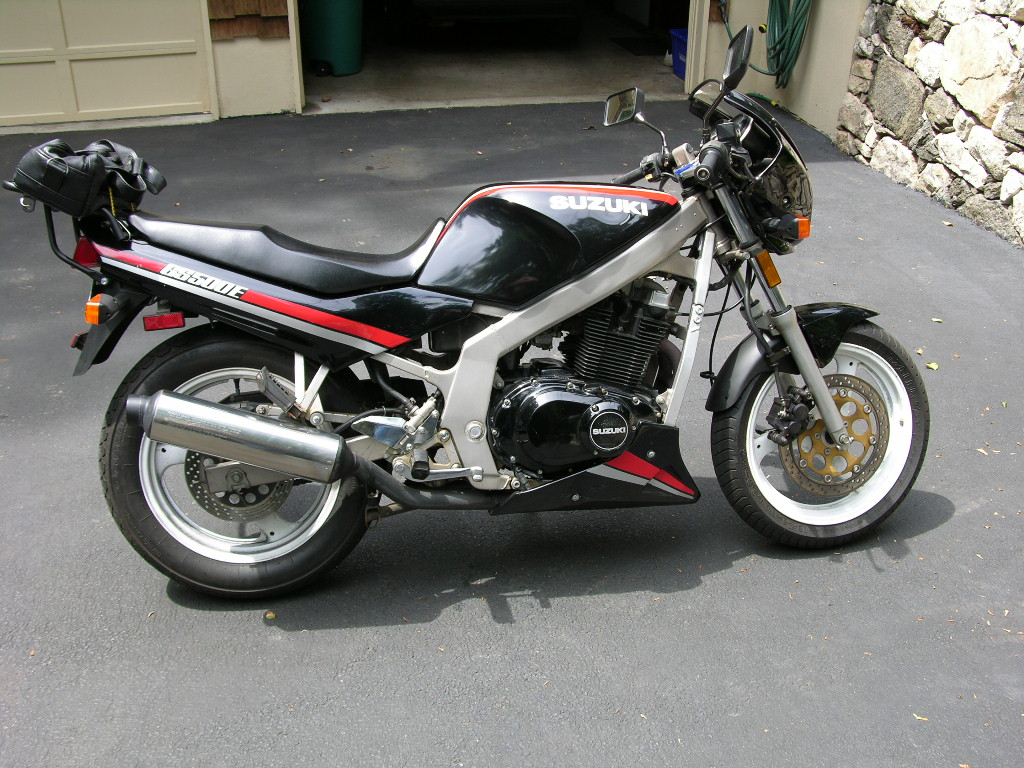
GS500E with factory chin spoiler

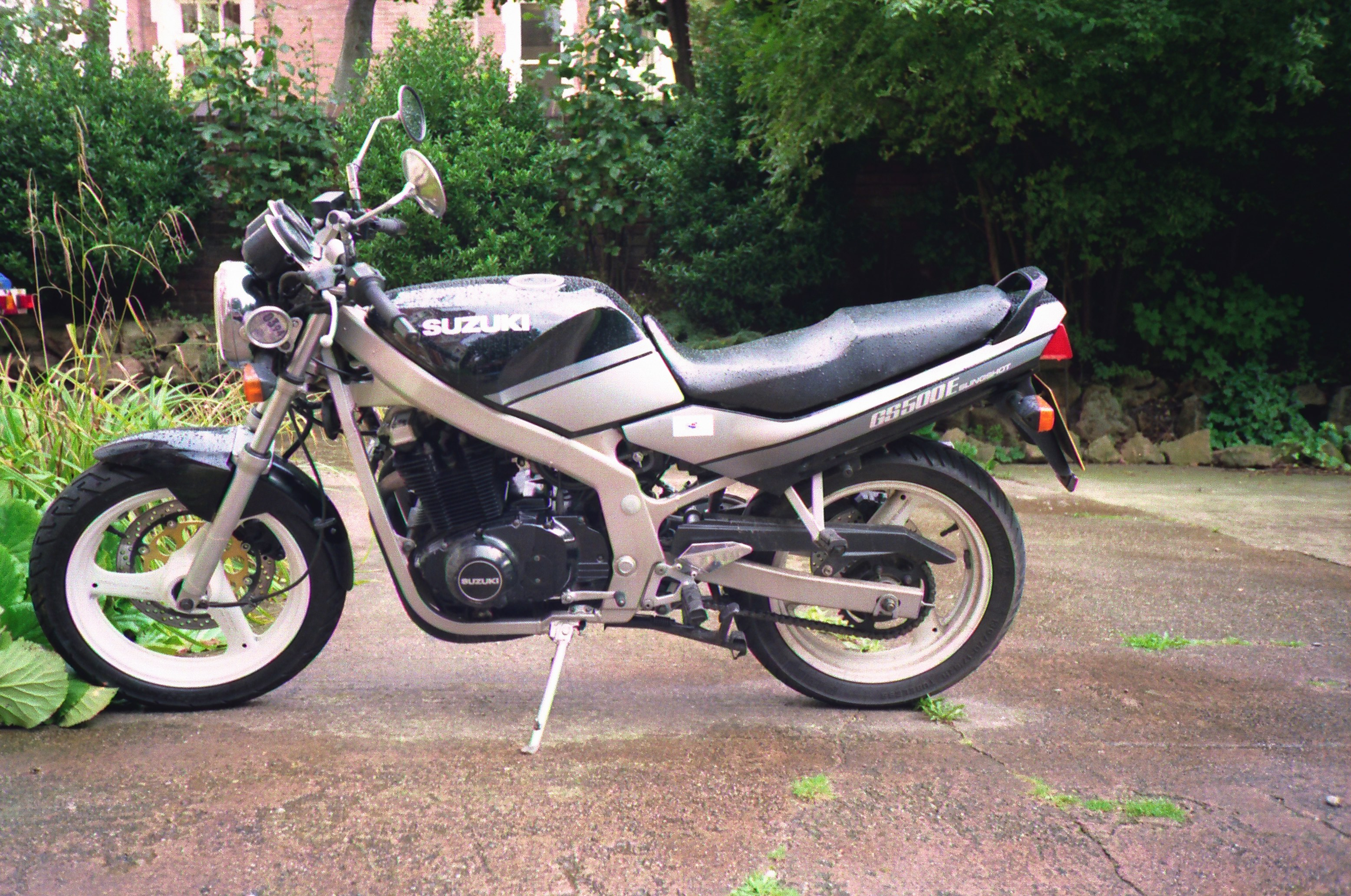
Suzuki GS500E

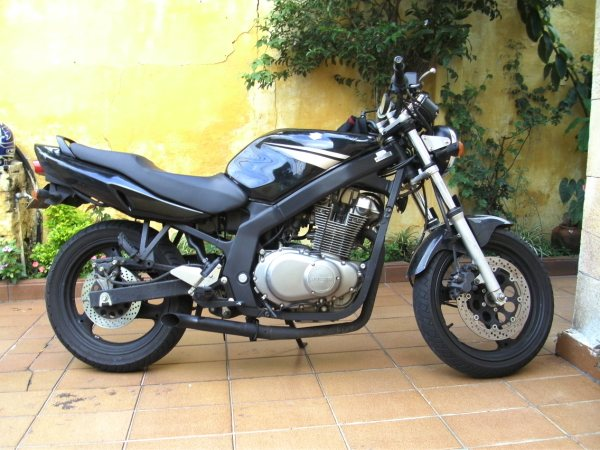
2002 Suzuki GS 500

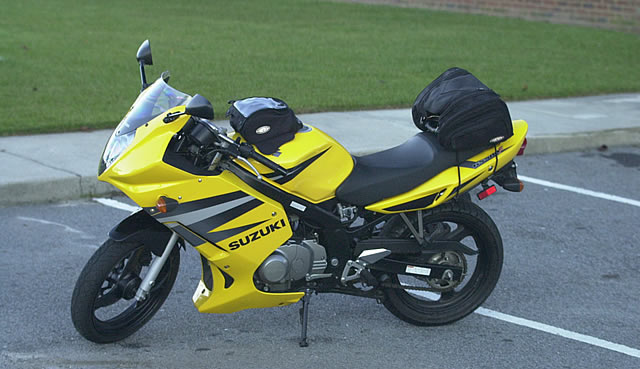
2004 GS500F
