= Suzuki GS450 =

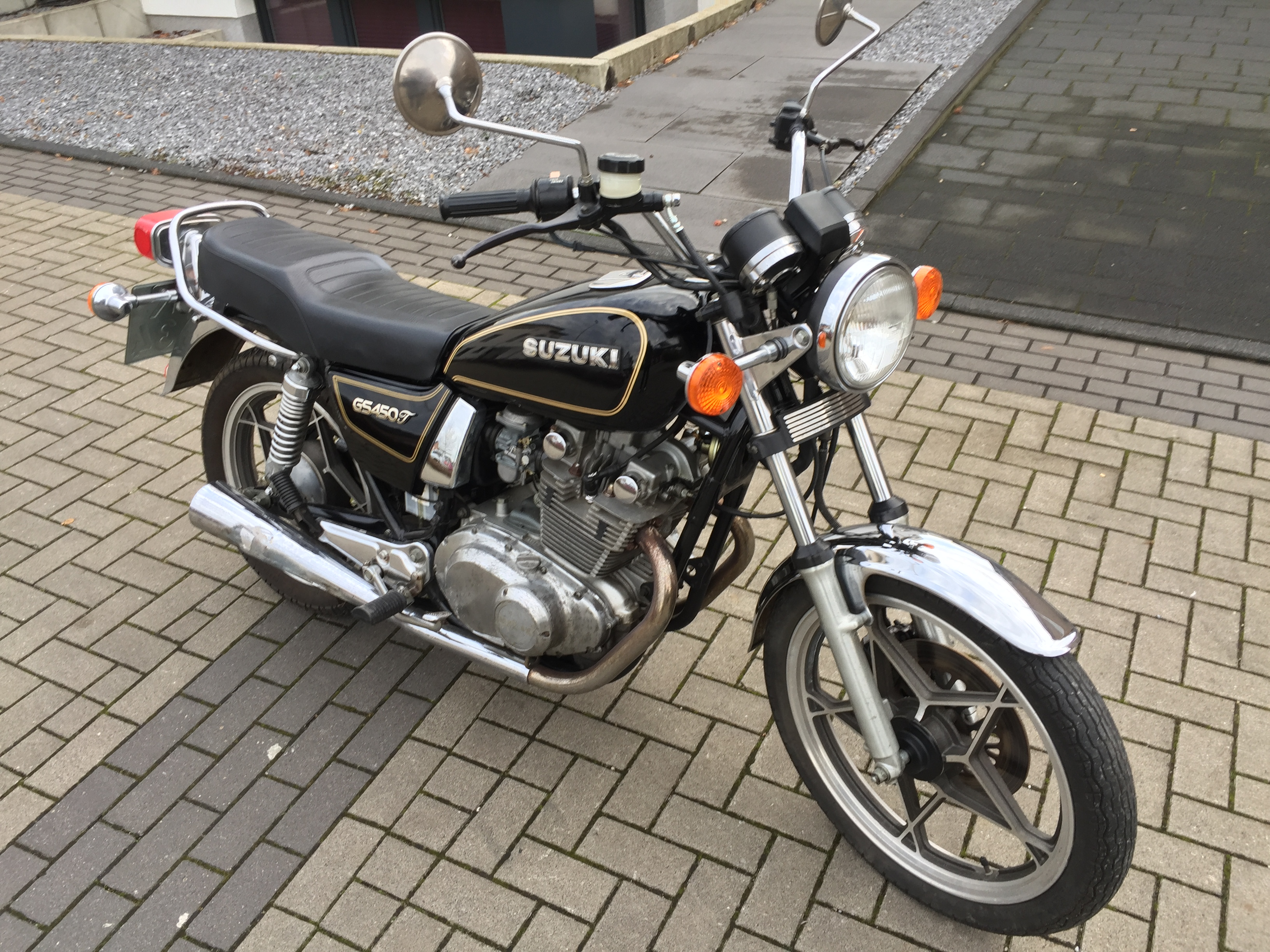
- GS450T
- Manufacturer: Suzuki Motor Corporation
- Production: 1980
- Predecessor: Suzuki GSX400
- Successor: Suzuki GS500
- Class: Standard
- Engine: 448cc, 4-stroke cycle, air-cooled parallel twin, DOHC (Dual overhead camshaft), 2 cylinder
- Transmission: 6-speed, chain drive
- Rake, trail: 25 degrees, 97 mm (3.8 in)
- Wheelbase: 1,405 mm (55.3 in)
- Dimensions: L: 2,080 mm (82 in); W: 800 mm (31 in)
- Seat height: 790 mm (31 in)
- Weight: 385 pounds (175 kg) (wet)
- Fuel capacity: 17.0 L (3.7 imp gal; 4.5 US gal); 20.0 L (4.4 imp gal; 5.3 US gal) (from 2001)

The GS450 was a Suzuki motorcycle produced in the early 1980s. It was a two-valve design of the four-valved GSX400 hence based on the pressurized oil and shell bearing GSX block like its successor, the GS500 twin.

Model variants include the GS450E, GS450L, GS450S, GS450T, and GS450GA Suzukimatic. The GS450 series was a direct competitor to the Honda CM400 / CM450 series. The GS450A Suzukimatic was only produced for 2 years 1982 and 1983 coinciding with the change of the CM400A Hondamatic up to the CM450A, as a direct response to the GS450A Suzukimatic. Both the Suzukimatic and the Hondamatic ceased production after the 1983 model year.

== History ==
The 1980 Suzuki GS450 is a 448cc engine street racer bike that was first created by the Japanese manufacturer Suzuki in direct competition with Honda's CM series. It was put into production after its predecessor, the GS 400, which was manufactured from 1976 to 1981, and discontinued when its successor, the GS500, entered production from 1989 to 2009. The GS450 is considered a standard, a relatively small bike that can be extensively modified to suit a rider's taste.

== Specifications ==
The specifications of the bike include an 2.08 meters long, 49.5 centimeters wide frame, with a 79 centimeters seat height and 138.4 centimeter wheel base. Without fluids the bike weighs 175 kg. It is able to carry 205 kg of rider and luggage. Able to reach speeds of 100 mph (160 km/h) this motorcycle can take the rider where they want to go in a quick and stylish manner. An electric ignition and starter make for easy startup. It has been claimed that the twin cylinder motor can reach 23 km/L in a patient cruise.

== Design ==
The 1980 GS model has a mix of German, Japanese and Italian sport bike styling which is simply dubbed "Eurostyle." Cycleworld notes that "the 450's suspension is not as efficient as the handling of the bike, yet this bike boasts one of the most soft supple rides of all small engine street bikes that no other bike with the same displacement can match." Because of the low handlebar placement and slightly rear-set foot pegs, the rider is put into a racer position when cornering.

=== Criticism ===
In cold weather, this bike takes an extended period of time to warm up, usually less than 90 seconds.
