= Suzuki GS series =

Series of motorcycles

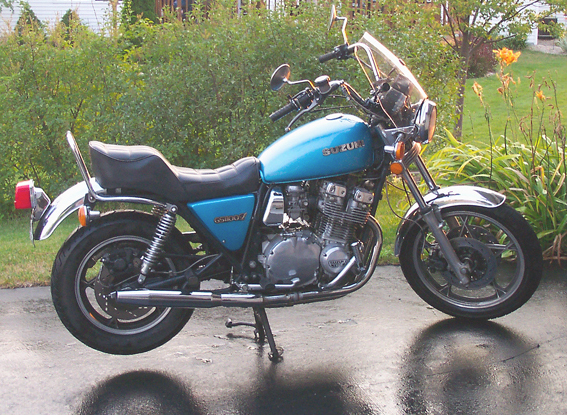
1980 Suzuki GS1100L

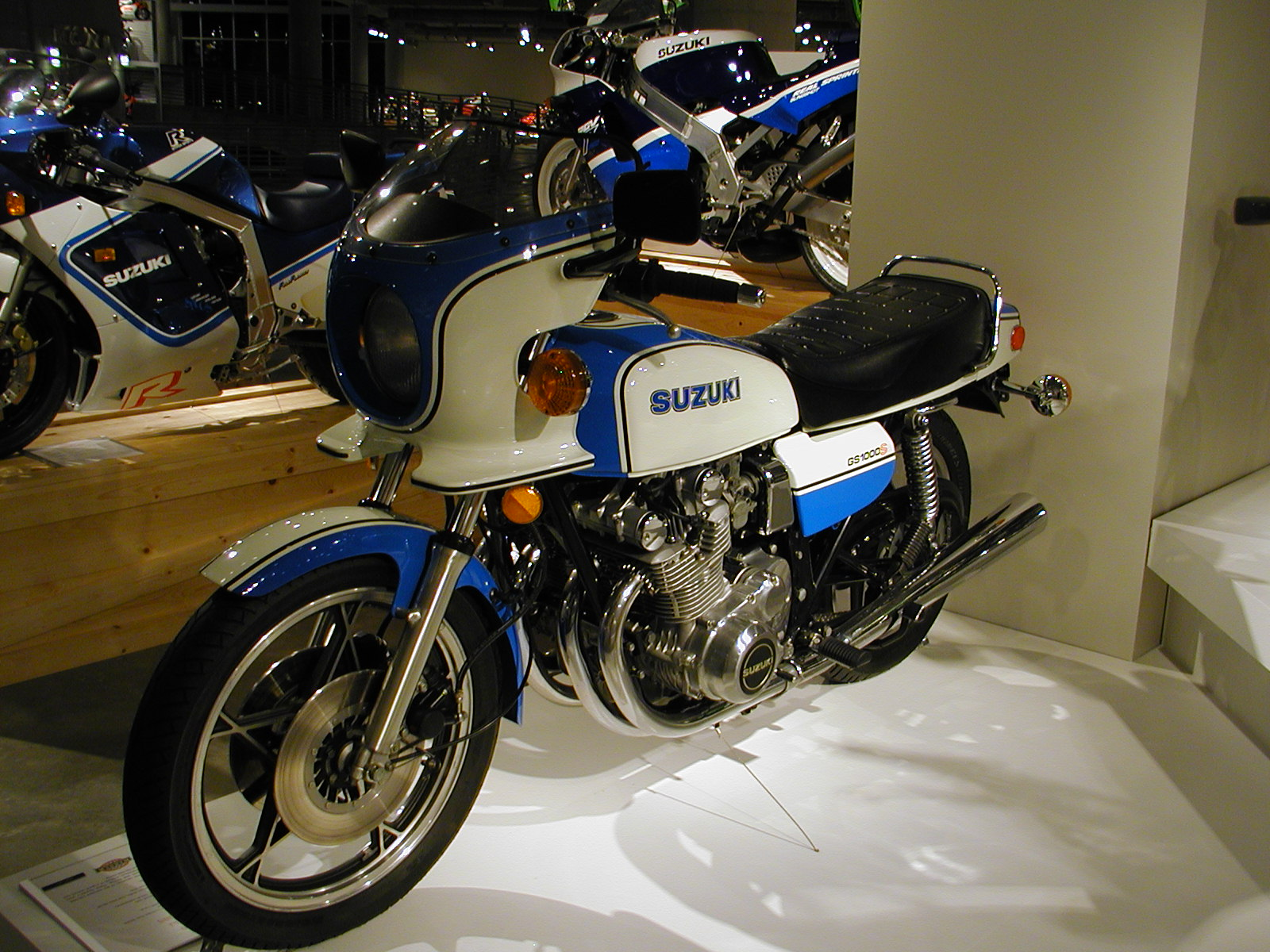
Suzuki GS1000S, sometimes called the 'Wes Cooley replica'.

The Suzuki GS series was Suzuki Motor Corporation's first full range of 4-stroke powered road motorcycles, having previously almost exclusively manufactured 2-stroke machines. Suzuki had produced the 4-stroke Colleda COX 125cc and 93cc 4-stroke single-cylinder machines in 1955 however the rest of Suzuki's production from 1952 to 1976 had been increasingly sophisticated two-stroke road machines, whose ultimate expression was the 750cc 3-cylinder water-cooled GT750.

== First models ==
The first of the GS Series was the four-cylinder GS750 released alongside the GS400 parallel twin in November 1976. The GS750 engine was essentially patterned off the Kawasaki Z1-900, and became the design basis for all air-cooled Suzuki four-stroke fours until the release of the air-oil cooled GSX-R. The engine was fitted into a dual cradle frame with telescopic forks, twin rear shocks and a front single disc brake. The new GS750 was lauded for its handling at the time of its release, which was considered a significant improvement over Japanese contemporaries like the Honda CB750, the shaft-driven Yamaha XS750, or the more powerful but wayward handling Kawasaki 900.

The GS range was expanded in subsequent model years with a smaller 550cc four-cylinder GS550 and larger GS1000 added in 1977 with the range ultimately including 125cc single cylinder machines the GS125 and larger retro-styled machines such as the GS1200SS. The GS400 was initially bored out to 423 cc (GS425), and subsequently enlarged to power the four-valve GS450, and with an eight-valve TSCC head used on the GSX400. The eight-valve design was later used on the GS500.

== Racing ==
The good handling chassis and reliable, over-engineered engines made the four cylinder GS bikes ideal platforms for motorcycle road racing, with the GS1000 tuned by Pops Yoshimura winning the 1978 Daytona Superbike race, the 1978 Suzuka 8 Hours in Japan, and the AMA Superbike national championship in 1979 and 1980 with rider Wes Cooley. The bike won the Australian Castrol Six Hour race in 1979. In Europe, Yoshimura GS1000-powered Formula 1 bikes won the Formula TT World Championship ridden by Graeme Crosby in 1980 and 1981.

== Developments GS to GSX ==
The original GS engine designs share common elements of air-cooling, roller bearing crankshafts, two-valves per cylinder servicing a hemispherical combustion chambers with domed pistons and double overhead camshafts (DOHC) operating directly on shim and bucket tappets. In 1980 the first major upgrade of the 750cc and 1000cc machines featured 16-valve heads - four per cylinder - with the valves actuated by short forked rockers, and the enlargement of the litre bike to 1100cc (actually 1074cc). The new heads also used Suzuki's Twin Swirl Combustion Chamber (TSCC) technology and machines sporting the new technology were designated as GSX models in Japan, Europe, Africa, Australia, New Zealand, and many other markets, differentiating them from their two-valve per cylinder stable mates. In the Americas the GS code continued to be used for both four and two valve per cylinder machines. The new 750 engine also received a plain bearing crankshaft and higher geared oil pump to increase oil pressure. The 8-valve 650cc engine (actually 673cc) also got plain bearings and marked the transition from two-stroke origins of the design and facilitated the move to air-oil cooling.

The introduction of air-oil cooling via large radiators known as SACS in the road-going Suzuki motorcycle demarcated the GS/GSX machines from the new technology of the GSX-R machines, however this distinction is blurred somewhat by later models such as the GS1200SS which used the SACS equipped GSF1200 Bandit engine.

== Universal Japanese Motorcycle ==
During the 1970s and early 1980s the GS-range of models and contemporary machines from other Japanese manufactures shared so many common design configurations and features that this commonality of design gained the moniker the Universal Japanese Motorcycle. The universality of design wasn't that surprising as the GS and its contemporaries were designed as 'general purposes motorcycles' capable of sport riding, touring and commuting. It wasn't until the further development of more purpose-specialized machines, beginning in the GS range with the shaft-drive models for touring and the more sports-oriented GS1000S and GS/GSX1100 Katana models and later fully faired touring machines and race-replicas.

The range of motorcycles in the series had engine displacements between 125 cc and 1150 cc, and include the GS400 and GS500. The GS series also include the original Katana series, although both the 1000 and the 1100 had 16 valves, thus being a GSX. It was however still designated as a GS on some markets, primarily in the US.

== Models ==
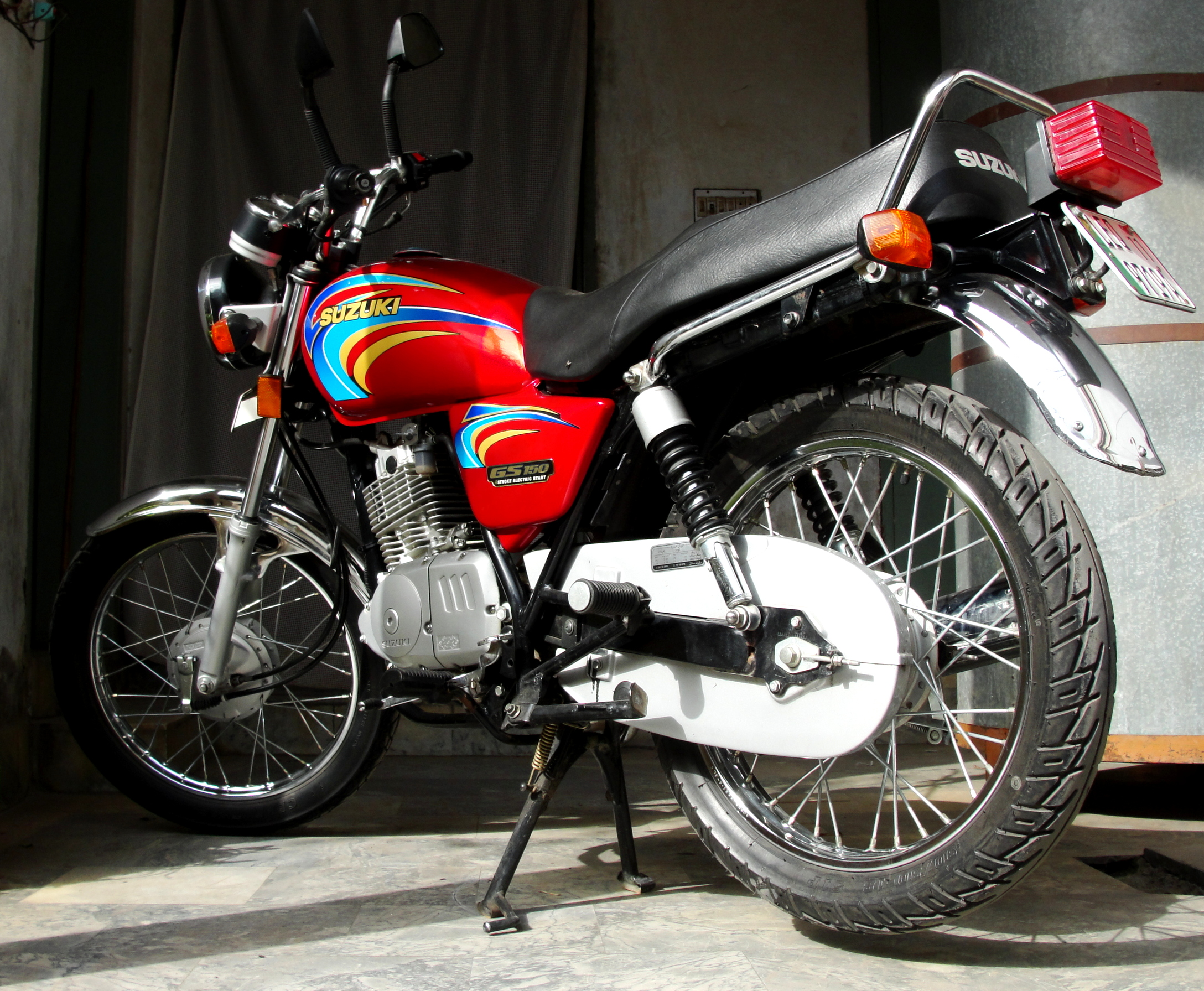
Suzuki GS 150 Motorcycle in Pakistan (aka Suzuki Mola 150 in Philippines)

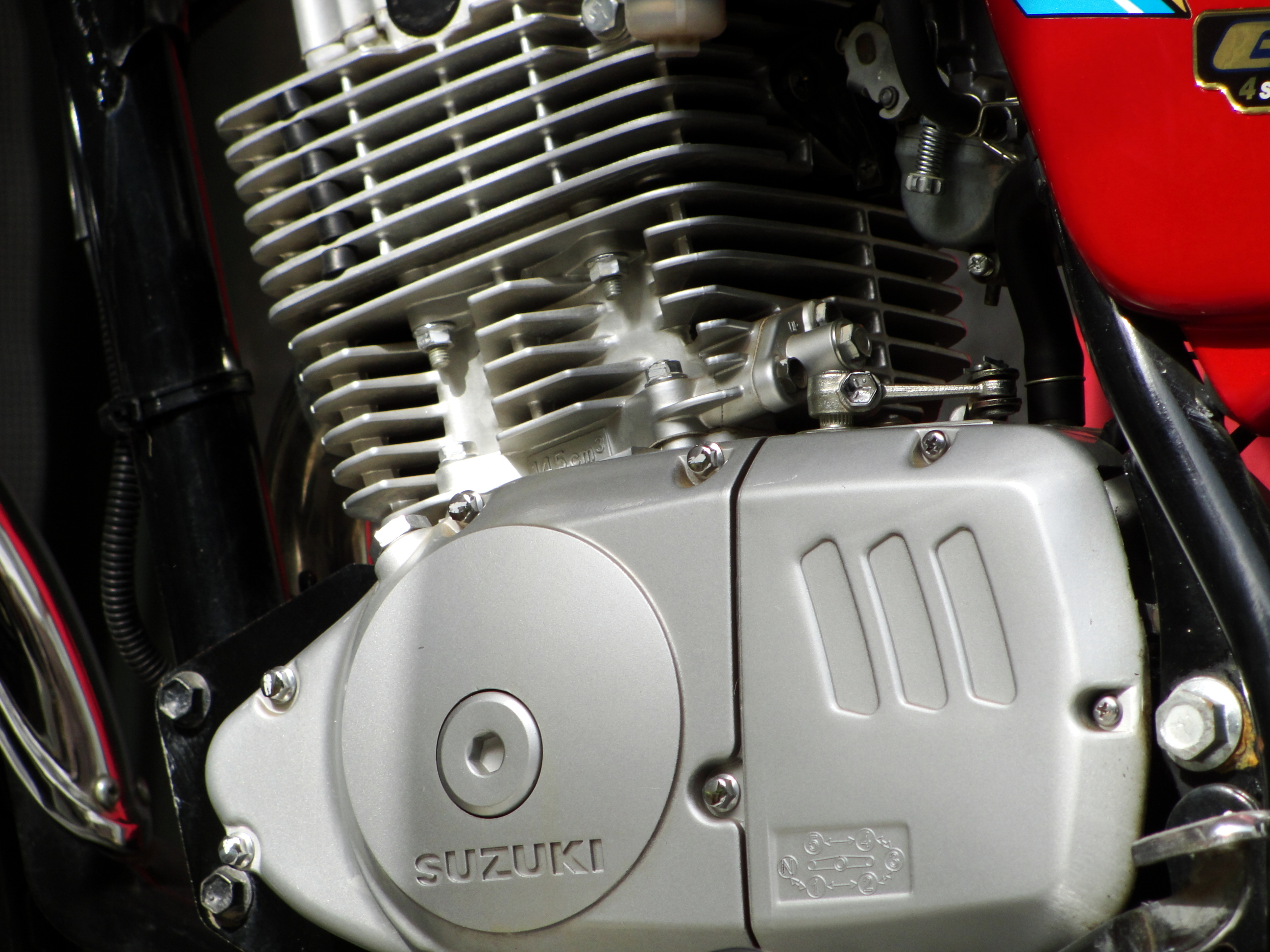
Suzuki GS-150 Engine

- GS125
- GS150
- GS150R
- GS250
- GS300
- GS400
- GS425
- GS450
- GS500
- GS550
- GS650
- GS700
- GS750
- GS850
- GS1000
- GS1100
- GS1150
- GS1200

== Shaft drive models ==
The G suffix after the model number indicates the model uses a shaft drive instead of the chain drive system. The G models included the GS450GA (Suzukimatic), GS650G and GL, GS750G and GL, GS850G and GL, GS1000G and GL, and GS1100G, GK, and GL. The G models were standard bikes with flat seats. The GL models were cruiser-style bikes with chrome fenders, smaller gas tanks, pull back handlebars, shorter exhausts, and stepped seats. The GS1100GK was a full-dress bike with factory fairing, trunk, and hard bags.

The GS1000 and GS1100 shaft drive models had 8-valve engines while later GS1000S (Katana) and all GS1100 chain drive models had 16 valve engines. Suzuki utilized the 1980s GS1100G blueprint to design the 1991 GSX1100G, combining a shaft-drive chassis with a modified GSX-R1100 engine that had 16 valves breathing through Mikuni 'slingshot' carburetors (which have a throttle slide that is flat on one side and rounded on the other to generate less intake turbulence).
