= Fire command vehicle =

Automobile used to transport fire officials to emergency scenes

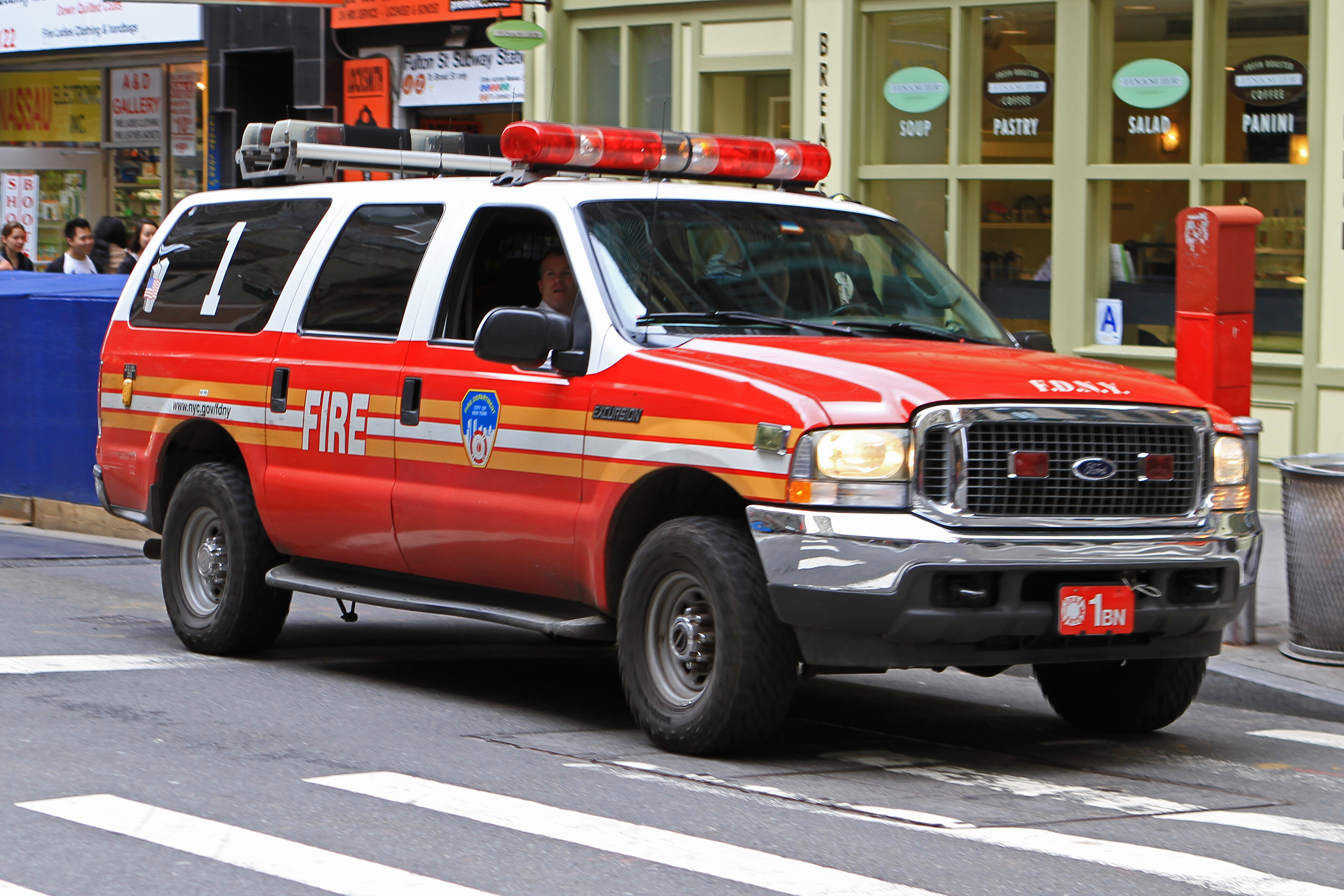
A Ford Excursion fire command vehicle used by the New York City Fire Department

A fire command vehicle, also called a fire chief car, battalion chief vehicle, fly car, or fire chief’s cruiser, is a vehicle used by a senior officer of a fire department to respond to firefighting incidents. Its markings typically indicate the rank of the senior officer.

In the 19th century, fire chief vehicles were horse-drawn, and known as a chief's buggy. With the advent and rise of the automobile, most fire departments retired their chief's buggies for automobiles with proper markings.

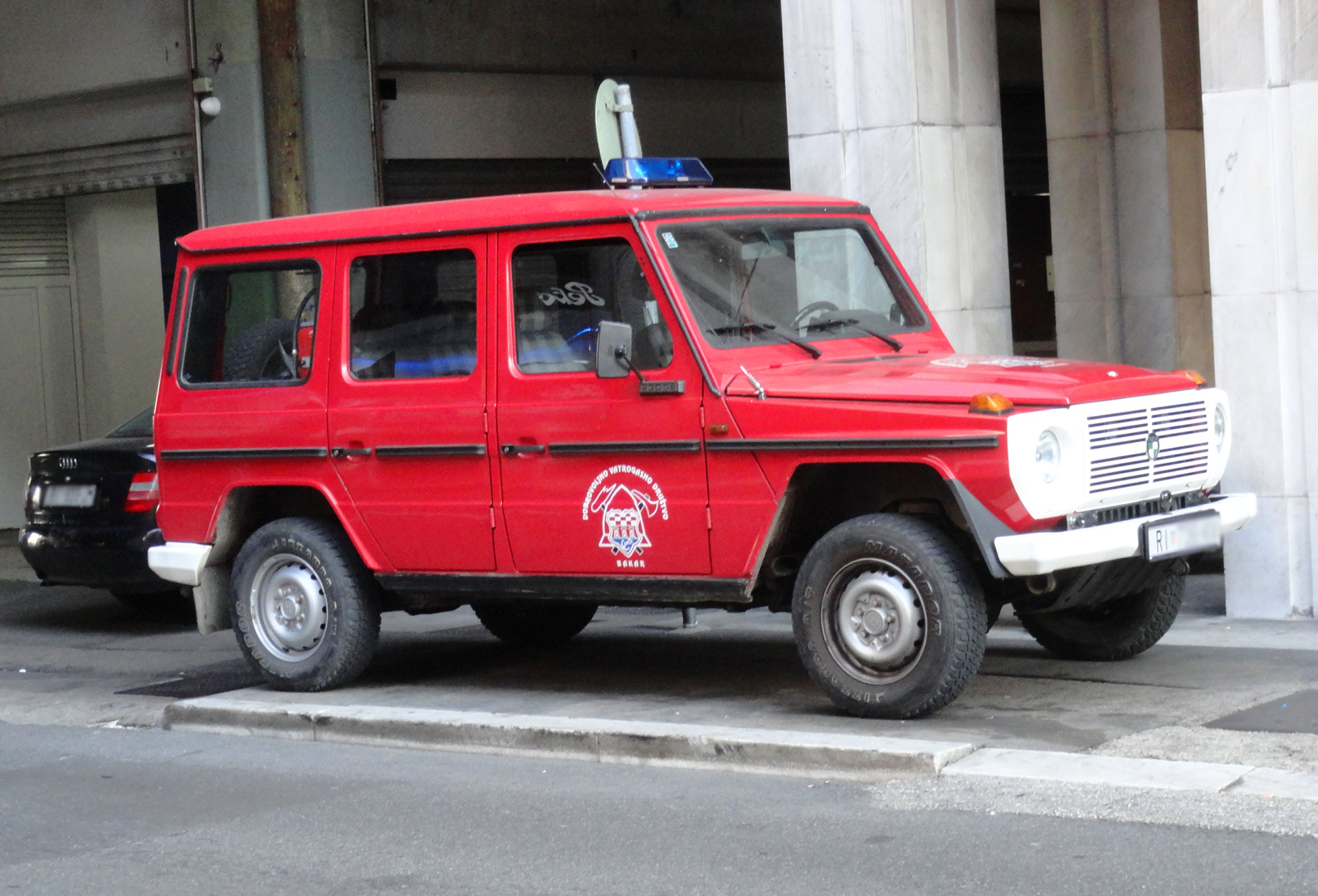
Mercedes-Benz G-Class fire command vehicle

In the United States, fire command vehicles are similar to police cars, and are equipped with emergency lighting and emergency vehicle equipment. Many fire departments use modified SUVs or pickup trucks as their command vehicles.

In the United Kingdom, the fire car is usually unmarked and personally owned by a station manager. The car has emergency lighting and equipment installed.

== See also ==
- Fire engine
- Nontransporting EMS vehicle
- Glossary of firefighting
