= Water detector =

Electronic device

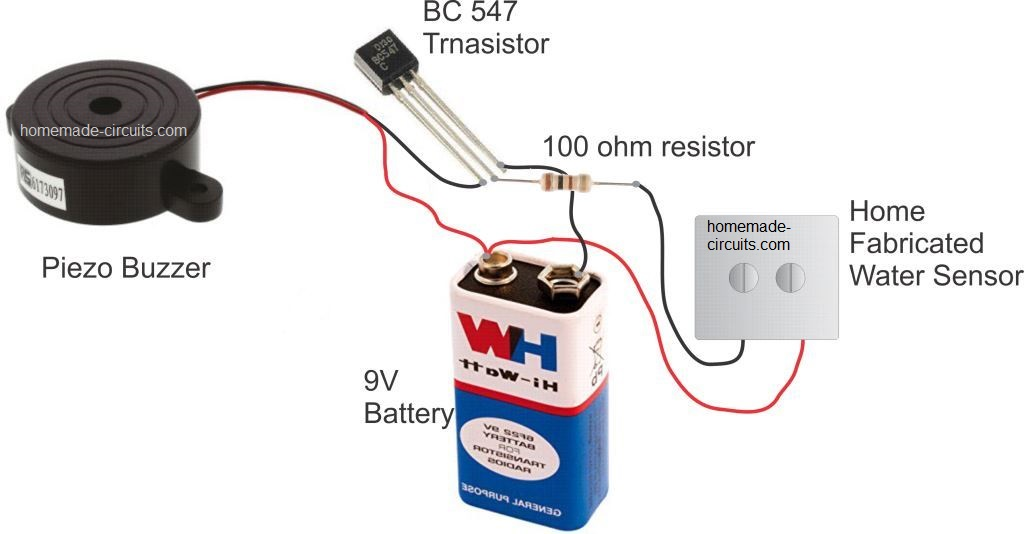
Electronic components used to make a simple water detector: battery, resistor, transistor, water sensor and piezoelectric buzzer for audible alert

A water detector is an electronic device that is designed to detect the presence of water for purposes such as to provide an alert in time to allow the prevention of water leakage. A common design is a small cable or device that lies flat on a floor and relies on the electrical conductivity of water to decrease the resistance across two contacts. The device then sounds an audible alarm together with providing onward signaling in the presence of enough water to bridge the contacts. These are useful in a normally occupied area near any infrastructure that has the potential to leak water, such as HVAC, water pipes, drain pipes, vending machines, dehumidifiers, or water tanks.

== Water leak detection ==
Water leak detection is an expression more commonly used for larger, integrated systems installed in modern buildings or those containing valuable artifacts, materials or other critical assets where early notification of a potentially damaging leak would be beneficial. In particular, water leak detection has become a necessity in data centers, trading floors, banks, archives and other mission-critical infrastructure.

The water leak detection industry is small and specialized with only a few manufacturers operating worldwide. The original application was in the void created by "computer room" floors in the days of large main-frame computer systems. These use a modular raised floor based around a structural "floor tile" usually 600 millimetres (24 in) square and supported at the corners by pedestals. The void created gave easy access and routing for the mass of power, networking and other interconnecting cables associated with larger computer systems - processors, drives, routers etc. mainframe computers also generated large amounts of heat so a void under the floor could also be used as a plenum to distribute and diffuse chilled air around the computer room. The void therefore was likely to have chilled water pipes running through it along with the drains for condensates associated with refrigeration plant. In addition, designers found the floor void a very convenient place to route other wet services feeding bathrooms, radiators and other facilities.

A leak occurring within a floor void would therefore go unnoticed until the hydrostatic head of pressure meant that the water found its way through to floors below where its dripping through the ceiling would be noted or, and more disconcerting, the water would penetrate the joints and connectors of the power or network cabling and cause system failure from short circuit.

Current digital water leak detection systems can locate multiple water leaks to within 1 meter resolution over a complex network of cables running several kilometers. This functionality reduces the downtime and potential damage caused by inaccurate reporting that was common with older analogue based systems.

Water leak detection systems can be integrated with Building Management Systems using multiple protocols such as Modbus. Using SNMP protocols leak detection systems can inform IT staff in charge of monitoring data center and server rooms.

== Integrated multi-zone systems ==
The computer room therefore became the early application for systems which would alert the operator to a leaking pipe in sufficient time for remedial action to be taken to prevent a disaster.

As computer rooms could be quite large simple "point of use" detectors were not really appropriate although Point Sensors do have value where simple, single point detection is required in, say, basements and sumps. Most modern leak detection systems developed around the use of a water sensitive cable which can be laid in long lengths and complex patterns around the base of the floor; around the perimeter of rooms; as a "barrier" over which water has to flow; following, tracing or attached directly to lines of water pipes.

== General application ==
The mainframe computer room has largely been replaced with the Data Centre but the application has remained with almost universal use of "computer-room" style raised floors in nearly all new commercial and office construction. To warrant the installation of leak detection the operator has to perceive the risk in addition to the circumstances but most Mechanical and Electrical Design Engineers will take a view of the risk of damage from a leak in terms of effect on the client's own operations, services and assets and, often as important, those of their adjoining neighbours and those on floors below.

The installation of leak detection systems is therefore becoming more commonplace in most new commercial office construction schemes along with the more obvious targets of museums, galleries and archives.

Leak detection systems must be unobtrusive, effective and robust enough to withstand getting dirty and the moderate physical abuse of other works being carried out under the same floor.

Zoned systems have a reputation for being safe, reliable and not prone to the same types of false alarms which those systems which use cumulative resistance techniques.

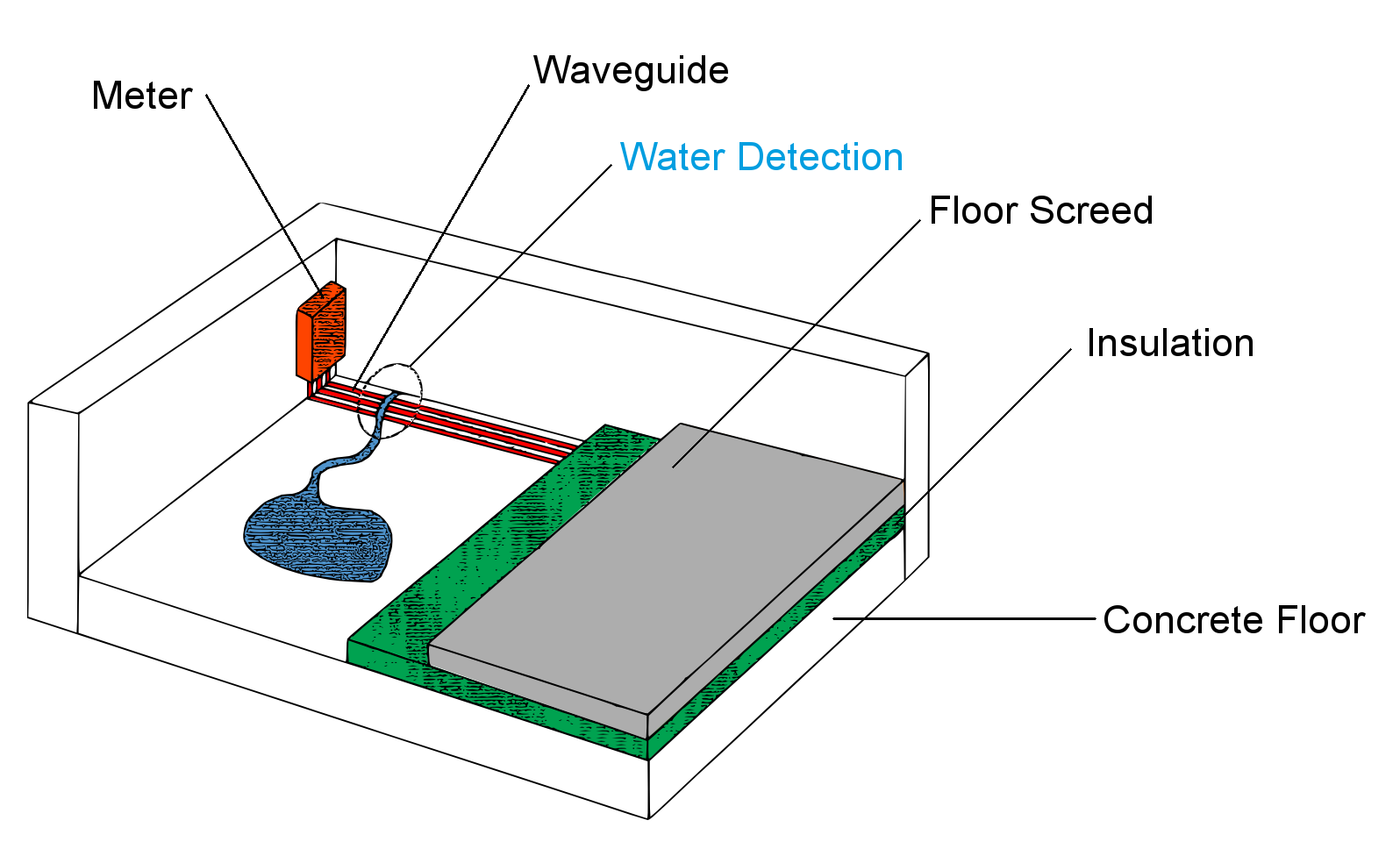
Moisture detection in buildings with time-domain reflectometry (TDR)

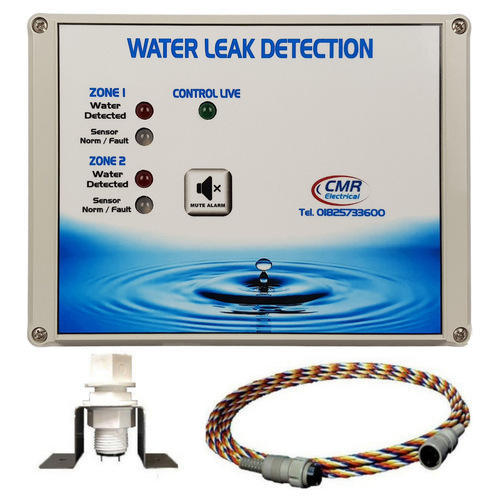
Water leak detection instrument

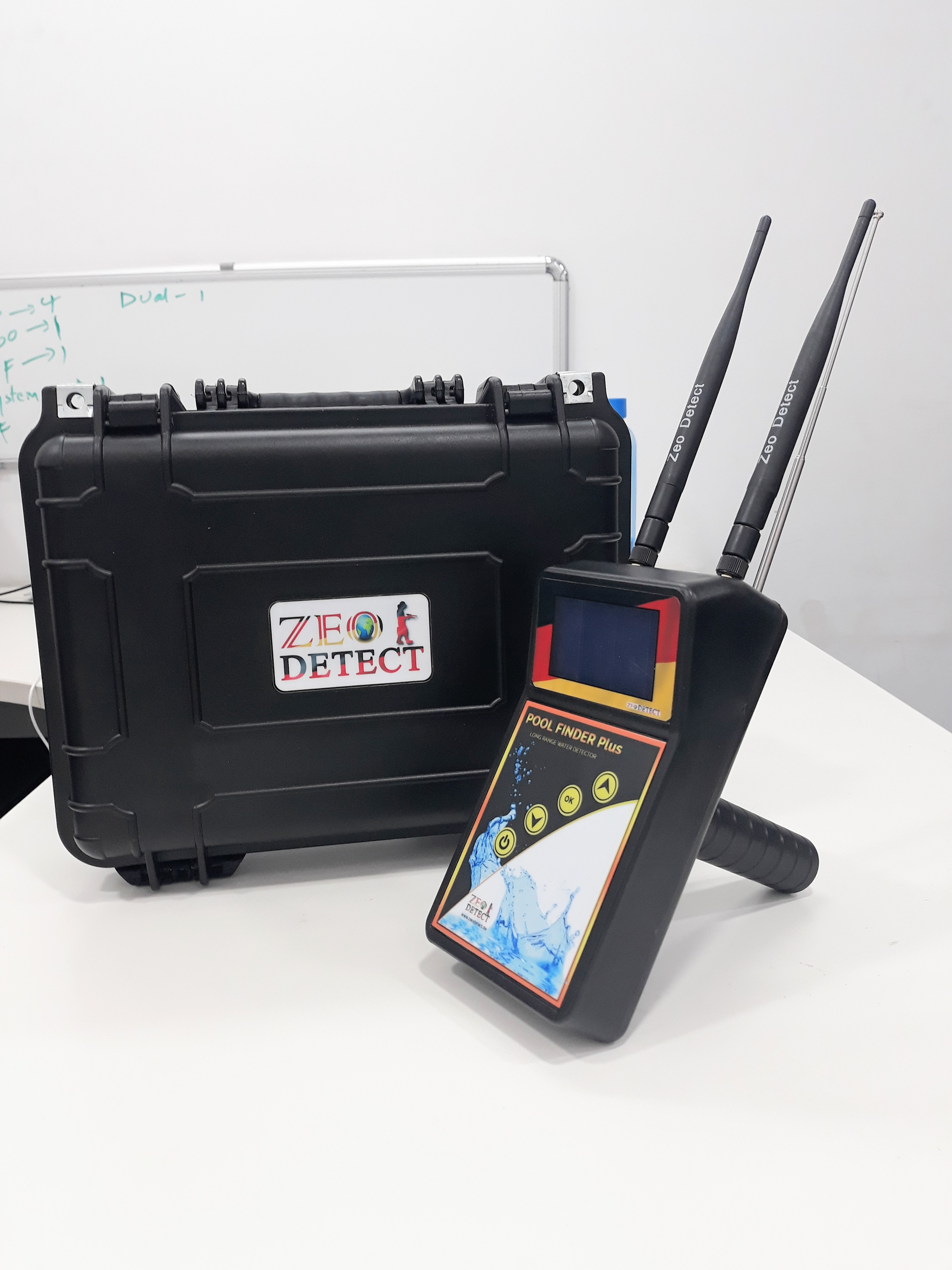
Water detector
