= Indianapolis motorcycle Grand Prix =

Indianapolis Grand Prix

Grand Prix motorcycle racing
- Venue: Indianapolis Motor Speedway (2008–2015)
- First race: 2008
- Last race: 2015
- Previous names: Red Bull Indianapolis GP (2008–2015); MotoAmerica Superbikes at the Brickyard (2020)
- Most wins (rider): Marc Márquez (5)
- Most wins (manufacturer): Honda (8)

The Indianapolis motorcycle Grand Prix was a motorcycling event held on the combined road course at the Indianapolis Motor Speedway in Speedway, Indiana. From 2008 to 2015, it was held as part of the Grand Prix motorcycle racing season (MotoGP). The event was revived in 2020 with MotoAmerica.

The addition of a motorcycle race at the Indianapolis Motor Speedway loosely coincided with the track's Centennial Era, which celebrated the 100th anniversary of the opening of the track (1909) and the 100th anniversary of the first 500 (1911). The motorcycle race represented a "throwback" to the early days of the Speedway, as motorcycle races were in fact the first competitive racing events held on the track in August 1909.

== Track layout ==
Original Motorcycle Circuit layout (2008–2013)

The circuit used is a modified version of the combined road course used for the Formula One United States Grand Prix from 2000 to 2007. The circuit was reversed to a counterclockwise orientation, and a new complex of corners was added inside the infield of oval turn one. The new "Snake Pit" section, as it became known, was nicknamed for its location where notorious revelry once took place during the 1970s. The new series of corners precluded the bikes from using any of the banked oval corners. The double-hairpin near the museum and before the Hulman Straight was replaced with more traditional esses. Furthermore, the motorcycles stay low in the south short chute (approaching the Snake Pit section) between oval turn 1 and 2, using the pavement of the warm-up lane rather than the oval track's short chute.

The circuit was re-profiled in 2014, with three new motorcycle-only sections: one in the Snake Pit (which has become a prime overtaking spot), a more open entrance to Hulman Straight, and the final esses leading to the pit straight was changed to be more open and flowing.

== History ==
The inaugural Red Bull Indianapolis GP took place 99 years after the previous motorcycle race at the track, in 1909.

=== National Motorcycle Race Meet (1909) ===
The first motorsports event at the track consisted of 7 motorcycle races, ranging from 1 to 10 miles in length, on August 14, 1909, on the 2.5 mile oval. All races were sanctioned by the Federation of American Motorcyclists (FAM). A planned feature race of 25 miles was canceled, as was a proposed second day of competition, due to concerns over suitability of track surface for motorcycle use.

Year	Date	Race	Winning rider	Motorcycle	Race distance		Class
Year	Date	Race	Winning rider	Motorcycle	Miles	Laps	Class
1909	Aug 14	1	(United States) A. G. Chapple	Indian	5	2	Handicap; Private Owners
1909	Aug 14	2	(United States) Fred Huyck	Indian	1	0.4	Amateur; < 61 cubic inch
1909	Aug 14	3	(United States) Paul E. Koutowski	Minneapolis	5	2	Handicap; Indiana Motor Cycle Club
1909	Aug 14	4	(United States) Fred Huyck	Indian	5	2	Handicap; < 55 cubic inch
1909	Aug 14	5	(United States) Ed Lingenfelder	N.S.U.	10	4	Professional
1909	Aug 14	6	(United States) Fred Huyck	Indian	5	2	Handicap; Amateur; < 61 cubic inch
1909	Aug 14	7	(United States) Edwin G. Baker	Indian	10	4	Amateur

=== Motorcycles on Meridian rally ===
The race became part of a major motorcycle event organized by Indianapolis Motor Speedway, the Motorcycles on Meridian motorcycle rally, held on Meridian Street near Monument Circle in downtown Indianapolis, attracting approximately 10,000 cyclists each night. Various dirt tracks held flat-track motorcycle races during the weekend which became analogous to midget car racing's "Night Before the 500" held during the Indianapolis 500, often drawing star MotoGP riders in attendance. The event continued to be held, and with the 2020 Indianapolis 500 being moved to the August event of the Motorcycles on Meridian date, both the Motorcycles on Meridian and the MotoAmerica round were changed.

== Grand Prix motorcycle racing winners ==
Year	Track	Moto3		Moto2		MotoGP		Report
Year	Track	Rider	Manufacturer	Rider	Manufacturer	Rider	Manufacturer	Report
2015	Indianapolis	(Belgium) Livio Loi	Honda	(Spain) Álex Rins	Kalex	(Spain) Marc Márquez	Honda	Report
2014	Indianapolis	(Spain) Efrén Vázquez	Honda	(Finland) Mika Kallio	Kalex	(Spain) Marc Márquez	Honda	Report
2013	Indianapolis	(Spain) Álex Rins	KTM	(Spain) Esteve Rabat	Kalex	(Spain) Marc Márquez	Honda	Report
2012	Indianapolis	(Spain) Luis Salom	Kalex KTM	(Spain) Marc Márquez	Suter	(Spain) Dani Pedrosa	Honda	Report
Year	Track	125cc		Moto2		MotoGP		Report
Year	Track	Rider	Manufacturer	Rider	Manufacturer	Rider	Manufacturer	Report
2011	Indianapolis	(Spain) Nicolás Terol	Aprilia	(Spain) Marc Márquez	Suter	(Australia) Casey Stoner	Honda	Report
2010	Indianapolis	(Spain) Nicolás Terol	Aprilia	(Spain) Toni Elías	Moriwaki	(Spain) Dani Pedrosa	Honda	Report
Year	Track	125cc		250cc		MotoGP		Report
Year	Track	Rider	Manufacturer	Rider	Manufacturer	Rider	Manufacturer	Report
2009	Indianapolis	(Spain) Pol Espargaró	Derbi	(Italy) Marco Simoncelli	Gilera	(Spain) Jorge Lorenzo	Yamaha	Report
2008	Indianapolis	(Spain) Nicolás Terol	Aprilia	Cancelled - Hurricane Ike (Note: The 2008 250cc race was initially postponed after the MotoGP race due to torrential rain & winds caused by Hurricane Ike just before the start of the race, it was subsequently cancelled for the same reason.)		(Italy) Valentino Rossi	Yamaha	Report

=== Multiple winners (riders) ===
# Wins	Rider	Wins	
# Wins	Rider	Category	Years won
5	(Spain) Marc Márquez	MotoGP	2013, 2014, 2015
5	(Spain) Marc Márquez	Moto2	2011, 2012
3	(Spain) Nicolás Terol	125cc	2008, 2010, 2011
2	(Spain) Dani Pedrosa	MotoGP	2010, 2012
2	(Spain) Álex Rins	Moto2	2015
2	(Spain) Álex Rins	Moto3	2013

=== Multiple winners (manufacturers) ===
# Wins	Manufacturer	Wins	
# Wins	Manufacturer	Category	Years won
8	(Japan) Honda	MotoGP	2010, 2011, 2012, 2013, 2014, 2015
8	(Japan) Honda	Moto3	2014, 2015
4	(Germany) Kalex	Moto2	2013, 2014, 2015
4	(Germany) Kalex	Moto3	2012
3	(Italy) Aprilia	125cc	2008, 2010, 2011
2	(Japan) Yamaha	MotoGP	2008, 2009
2	(Switzerland) Suter	Moto2	2011, 2012

== Support races ==
=== Red Bull Rookies Cup (2008) ===
The Red Bull AMA Rookies Cup was an entry-level series for young riders, held as support features primarily at AMA Superbike events. It was the US counterpart to the Red Bull MotoGP Rookies Cup, a similar series held as support features at European MotoGP events. The Red Bull Riders Cup was an all-star event combining the leading riders in the AMA Rookies Cup and MotoGP Rookies Cup series. The Red Bull AMA Rookies Cup and Red Bull Riders Cup each held a race, as support to the Red Bull Indianapolis GP. All participating motorcycles: KTM.

Year	Date	Series	Winning rider	Race distance	
Year	Date	Series	Winning rider	Miles	Laps
2008	Sep 13	Red Bull AMA Rookies Cup	(United States) Jacob Gagne	41.9	16
2008	Sep 14	Red Bull Riders Cup	(Norway) Sturla Fagerhaug	36.7	14

=== USGPRU Moriwaki MD250H (2010) ===
The Moriwaki MD250H series is an entry-level category for young riders, sanctioned by the United States Grand Prix Racers Union. The series held twin races, as support to the Red Bull Indianapolis GP. All participating motorcycles: Moriwaki chassis with Honda engines.

Year	Date	Winning rider	Race distance	
Year	Date	Winning rider	Miles	Laps
2010	Aug 28	(United States) Garrett Gerloff	31.5	12
2010	Aug 29	(United States) Garrett Gerloff	28.8	11

=== AMA Pro Vance and Hines XR1200 (2011–2014) ===
The Pro Vance & Hines XR1200 series, sanctioned by AMA Pro Road Racing, held twin races, as support to the Red Bull Indianapolis GP. All participating motorcycles: Harley-Davidson XR1200.

Year	Date	Winning rider	Race distance	
Year	Date	Winning rider	Miles	Laps
2011	Aug 27	(United States) Tyler O'Hara	26.2	10
2011	Aug 28	(United States) Chris Fillmore	26.2	10
2012	Aug 18	(United States) Kyle Wyman	13.1	5
2012	Aug 19	(United States) Tyler O'Hara	26.2	10
2013	Aug 17	(United Kingdom) Jeremy McWilliams	26.2	10
2013	Aug 18	(Malaysia) Hafizh Syahrin	26.2	10
2014	Aug 9	(United Kingdom) Jeremy McWilliams	25.9	10
2014	Aug 10	(United States) Steve Rapp	25.9	10

=== FIM eRoadRacing North American Regional Series (2013) ===
The North American series of the FIM eRoadRacing World Cup, a championship of electric motorcycle road racing, held a race as support to the Red Bull Indianapolis GP.

Year	Date	Winning rider	Motorcycle	Race distance	
Year	Date	Winning rider	Motorcycle	Miles	Laps
2013	Aug 18	(United States) Shane Turpin	Brammo Empulse RR	21.0	8

== MotoAmerica ==
=== MotoAmerica Superbike and Superstock 1000 (2015, 2020) ===
The MotoAmerica Superbike Championship ran two races, each with two classes being run concurrently, as support to the Red Bull Indianapolis GP. The Superstock 1000 class was abolished after 2017. In 2020, the series was originally scheduled to return as part of Motorcycles on Meridian. Because of the Indianapolis 500 being rescheduled for the Meridian weekend, the races occurred in mid-October with limited number of spectators.

Year	Date	Class	Winning rider	Motorcycle	Race distance	
Year	Date	Class	Winning rider	Motorcycle	Miles	Laps
2015	Aug 8	Superbike	(United States) Cameron Beaubier	Yamaha	46.6	18
2015	Aug 8	Superstock 1000	(United States) Jacob Gagne	Yamaha	46.6	18
2015	Aug 9	Superbike	(United States) Cameron Beaubier	Yamaha	46.6	18
2015	Aug 9	Superstock 1000	(United States) Jacob Gagne	Yamaha	46.6	18
2020	Oct 10	Superbike	(United States) Bobby Fong	Suzuki	38.9	15
2020	Oct 10	Superbike	(Italy) Lorenzo Zanetti	Ducati	44.0	17
2020	Oct 11	Superbike	(United States) Bobby Fong	Suzuki	31.1	12

=== MotoAmerica Supersport (2015, 2020) ===
The MotoAmerica Supersport series held a race as support to the Red Bull Indianapolis GP. In 2020, the series was originally scheduled to return as part of Motorcycles on Meridian. After Motorcycles on Meridian was canceled due to the 2019-20 coronavirus pandemic, the races occurred anyway in front of a limited number of spectators.

Year	Date	Winning rider	Motorcycle	Race distance	
Year	Date	Winning rider	Motorcycle	Miles	Laps
2015	Aug 8	(United States) Garrett Gerloff	Yamaha	38.9	15
2020	Oct 10	(Mexico) Richie Escalante	Kawasaki	41.4	16
2020	Oct 10	(Mexico) Richie Escalante	Kawasaki	41.4	16

=== MotoAmerica Stock 1000 (2020) ===
The MotoAmerica Stock 1000 series race was originally scheduled as a companion event to Motorcycles on Meridian in 2020. After Motorcycles on Meridian was canceled due to the 2019-20 coronavirus pandemic, the race occurred anyway in front of a limited number of spectators. This series was effectively the replacement of the Superstock 1000 class, with slight differences.

Year	Date	Winning rider	Motorcycle	Race distance	
Year	Date	Winning rider	Motorcycle	Miles	Laps
2020	Oct 10	(United States) Travis Wyman	BMW	33.7	13

=== MotoAmerica Twins Cup (2020) ===
The MotoAmerica Twins Cup series race was originally scheduled as a companion event to Motorcycles on Meridian in 2020. After Motorcycles on Meridian was canceled due to the 2019-20 coronavirus pandemic, the race occurred anyway in front of a limited number of spectators.

Year	Date	Winning rider	Motorcycle	Race distance	
Year	Date	Winning rider	Motorcycle	Miles	Laps
2020	Oct 10	(United States) Rocco Landers	Suzuki	31.1	12

=== MotoAmerica Liqui Moly Junior Cup (2020) ===
The MotoAmerica Liqui Moly Junior Cup series races were originally scheduled as a companion event to Motorcycles on Meridian in 2020. After Motorcycles on Meridian was canceled due to the 2019-20 coronavirus pandemic, the races occurred anyway in front of a limited number of spectators. This series is an entry-level class exclusively designated for riders younger than 25 years old.

Year	Date	Winning rider	Motorcycle	Race distance	
Year	Date	Winning rider	Motorcycle	Miles	Laps
2020	Oct 10	(United States) Rocco Landers	Kawasaki	18.1	7
2020	Oct 11	(United States) Rocco Landers	Kawasaki	28.5	11
