= Jayson Uribe =

American motorcycle racer (born 1999)

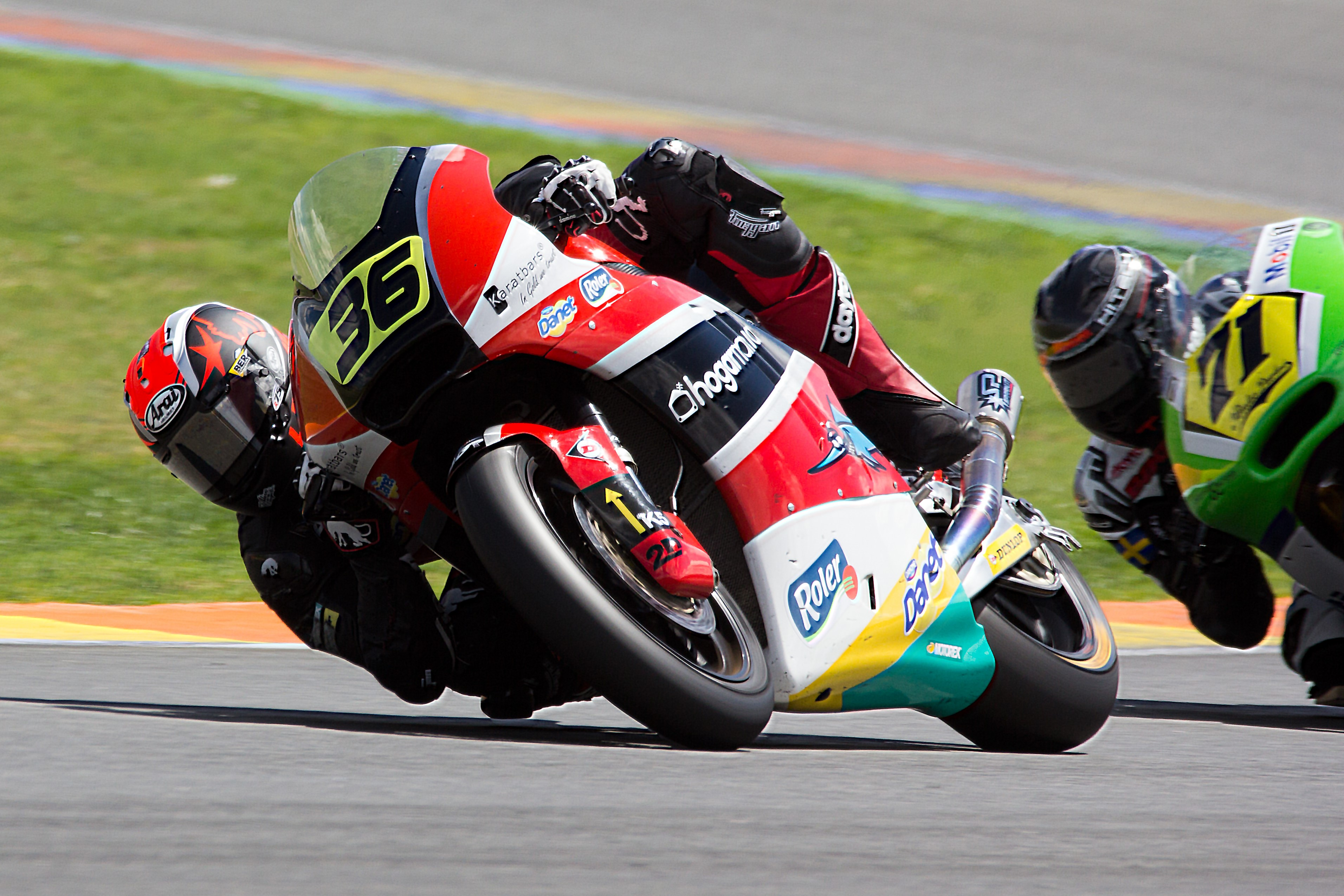
- Jayson Uribe at Ricardo Tormo Circuit in Valencia
- Born: 27 March 1999 (age 27); Bellevue, Washington, United States
Motorcycle racing career statistics
Superbike World Championship
Active years	2021
Manufacturers	Kawasaki
Championships	0
2021 championship position	NC (0 pts)
Starts / Wins / Podiums / Poles / F. laps / Points; 6 / 0 / 0 / 0 / 0 / 0

Jayson Uribe (born March 27, 1999, in Bellevue, Washington) is an American motorcycle racer from Napa Valley, California.

== Early career ==
Uribe began his motorcycle racing career at the age of four aboard a Honda 50. He advanced to a two stroke Kawasaki KX65 at the age of five and began racing motocross competitively in the Northern California region. At the age of seven, Uribe expanded his racing interest to Supermoto on his KX65 Kawasaki with Supermoto USA and excelled in his division. Uribe raced in and won several championships aboard his Honda big wheel CRF150R and CRF250R over the next five years. By the age of 12, he had taken his Honda CRF250R to the top step of the SRC National Lites Champion while riding for Mammoth Motorsports.

In 2009, Uribe began his road racing career aboard a 2004 production Honda RS125 two-stroke GP machine. He is the second-youngest licensed racer in AFM history. Uribe raced at a club level in WERA and AFM for three years; however due to his young age several racetracks would not allow him to ride on their circuit citing insurance issues, thus making a championship win nearly impossible. In 2011, he was the WERA West Novice Champion in the F2 class. In 2012 and 2013, he was one of six Americans invited to the Redbull Rookies tryouts in Spain.

== Championships ==
Between the years of 2013-2017, Uribe represented the USA internationally in the following championships:

2013: British Superbike Motul Motostar Championship - Monster Energy Motostar Championship - Rock and Sons Racing (2009 Honda RS125)

2014: British Superbike Motul Motostar Championship - Motul Motostar Championship - Fireplace Warehouse Racing (2012 Luyton Honda Moto3)

2015: French Superbike Championship - Pirelli 600 Cup - Race Experience Junior (2015 Honda CBR600RR)

2016: FIM CEV Moto2 European Championship - Moto2 - AGR Racing (2015 Honda CBR600RR with Kalex chassis)

2017: FIM CEV Moto2 European Championship - Moto2 - AGR Racing (2016 Honda CBR600RR with Kalex chassis)

In 2018, Uribe returned to his native home of California to begin his MotoAmerica Superbike Championship bid with Genuine Broaster ChickenHonda with Danny Walker as the principle of the team. On June 24, 2018, with no experience on the newly assembled 2017 Honda CBR1000rr sp2, he made his Superbike debut at Weather Tech Laguna Seca Raceway, where he finished 11th place out of a field of 19. Jayson Uribe Superbike press release by Michael Hill Productions.

== International career ==
Uribe's first international championship was in 2013 in the British Superbike Championship in the Monster Energy Motostar class. He and his mother lived in Nottingham, UK for the season while his father stayed in Napa Valley to continue the family electrical business. Uribe raced under the Rock and Sons Racing banner with Ian Emberton as his chief mechanic. He placed 11th overall in the Championship that year with his strongest race finish being seventh at Silverstone in 2013. Uribe was the only rider to finish every race in points contention; and he still holds the BSB record today with 19 consecutive finishes in points contention.

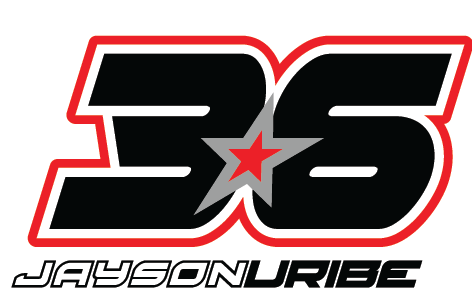
Jayson Uribe Racing

Uribe continued on in England for another year before a team from France, headed by the famous French endurance champion, Sebastien Gimbert, asked him to join his "Race Experience Junior" team and ride alongside two other French racers in the Pirelli 600 Cup in the French Superbike Championship. During the 2015 season, Uribe achieved five podium finishes and one win. With his win at Ledenon, he became the first American rider to ever win a race in FSBK history.

=== International championship standings ===
- 2013 Monster Energy Motostar Championship; Honda RS125 - 11th overall, best finish 7th (Rock and Sons Racing)
- 2014 Motul Moto3 Championship; Honda Moto3 - 3rd overall; best finish 2nd (Fireplace Warehouse Racing)
- 2015 French Superbike 600 Pirelli Cup; Honda CBR600RR - 5th overall, best finish 1st - Lap record for stock 600 at Circuit de Ledenon, first international win (Race Experience Junior)
- 2016 FIM CEV Moto2 European Championship - 2015 Kalex - 11th overall, best finish 7th (AGR Racing)
- 2017 FIM CEV Moto2 European Championship - 2016 Kalex - 11th overall, best finish 8th (AGR Racing)

Uribe's manager is Donnie Graves of NCompass International of Beverly Hills, Ca. while his publicist, Michael Hill (Michael Hill Productions).

Uribe works three jobs to help cover his racing expenses; he is an electrical apprentice at Rock and Sons, Inc.; a driving instructor and coach at the Allen Burg Racing School and an instructor with Danny Walker's American Supercamp, motorcycle technique school. Uribe is an accomplished journalist as well and is the owner of his own media company, Full Throttle Media, in Angwin, California. Uribe has been published in multiple international magazines and wrote a monthly column for Roadracing World called "Chasing the Dream" for three years. Beginning in 2015, he began a new relationship with Bonnier Motorsports Group, out of New York, as one of their International Field Correspondents responsible for covering the motorcycle racing scene in Europe.

== Career statistics ==
=== FIM CEV Moto2 European Championship ===
==== Races by year ====
(key) (Races in bold indicate pole position, races in italics indicate fastest lap)

Year	Bike	1	2	3	4	5	6	7	8	9	10	11	Pos	Pts
2016	Kalex	VAL1; 14	VAL2; 7	ARA1; 9	ARA2; 11	CAT1; 7	CAT2; 11	ALB; Ret	ALG1; Ret	ALG2; DNS	JER; 11	VAL; 8	11th	50
2017	Kalex	ALB; 10	CAT1; 11	CAT2; Ret	VAL1; Ret	VAL2; 10	EST1; Ret	EST2; 9	JER; 10	ARA1; 12	ARA2; 12	VAL; 8	11th	46

=== MotoAmerica SuperBike Championship ===
==== Races by year ====
(key) (Races in bold indicate pole position; races in italics indicate fastest lap)

Year	Class	Team	1		2		3		4		5		6		7		8			9			10		Pos	Pts
Year	Class	Team	R1	R2	R1	R2	R1	R2	R1	R2	R1	R2	R1	R2	R1	R2	R1	R2	R3	R1	R2	R3	R1	R2	Pos	Pts
2019	SuperBike	Honda	ATL	ATL	COA	COA	VIR	VIR	RAM	RAM	UMC; 8	UMC; 8	LGS; Ret	LGS; 10	SON	SON	PIT	PIT		NJR	NJR		BAR	BAR	15th	22
2020	SuperBike	Honda	RAM	RAM	RAM	RAM	ATL	ATL	PIT; 8	PIT; 8	TRD	TRD	NJR	NJR	ALA	ALA	BRI	BRI	BRI	LGS; 9	LGS; DNS	LGS; Ret			21st	23
2021	SuperBike	Suzuki	ATL; 16	ATL; 10	VIR; 8	VIR; Ret	RAM; Ret	RAM; 14	TRD; 10	TRD; 10	LGS; 11	LGS; DNS	BRA	BRA	PIT	PIT	NJR; 12	NJR; 18	NJR; 14	ALA; DNS	ALA; DNS	ALA; DNS			17th	39

=== Superbike World Championship ===
==== Races by year ====
(key) (Races in bold indicate pole position, races in italics indicate fastest lap)

Year	Bike	1			2			3			4			5			6			7			8			9			10			11			12			13			Pos	Pts
Year	Bike	R1	SR	R2	R1	SR	R2	R1	SR	R2	R1	SR	R2	R1	SR	R2	R1	SR	R2	R1	SR	R2	R1	SR	R2	R1	SR	R2	R1	SR	R2	R1	SR	R2	R1	SR	R2	R1	SR	R2	Pos	Pts
2021	Kawasaki	SPA	SPA	SPA	POR	POR	POR	ITA	ITA	ITA	GBR	GBR	GBR	NED	NED	NED	CZE; Ret	CZE; 20	CZE; 21	SPA; 18	SPA; 21	SPA; 16	FRA	FRA	FRA	SPA	SPA	SPA	SPA	SPA	SPA	POR	POR	POR	ARG	ARG	ARG	INA	INA	INA	NC	0
