= 2025 MotoAmerica Superbike Championship =

49th running of the MotoAmerica Superbike Championship

The 2025 MotoAmerica Superbike Championship season was the 49th season of the premier class of production-based motorcycle road racing in the United States and the eleventh with current promoter Wayne Rainey and the KRAVE group (dba MotoAmerica). The Superbike season started on April 17 at Road Atlanta, and finish on September 27 at New Jersey Motorsports Park.

Cameron Beaubier won his 6th Superbike Championship in the final round of the season.

== Calendar and Results ==
The 2025 schedule was announced on September 10, 2024.

Round		Circuit	Date	Pole position	Fastest lap	Winning rider	Winning team
1	R1	Barber Motorsports Park, Alabama	April 4–6	(United States) Cameron Beaubier	(United States) Cameron Beaubier	(United States) Cameron Beaubier	Tytlers Cycle Racing
1	R2	Barber Motorsports Park, Alabama	April 4–6	(United States) Cameron Beaubier	(United States) Josh Herrin	(United States) Jake Gagne	Attack Performance Progressive Yamaha Racing
2	R1	(Georgia (U.S. state)) Road Atlanta, Georgia	May 2–4	(United States) Cameron Beaubier	(United States) Cameron Beaubier	(United States) Cameron Beaubier	Tytlers Cycle Racing
2	R2	(Georgia (U.S. state)) Road Atlanta, Georgia	May 2–4	(United States) Cameron Beaubier	(United States) Cameron Beaubier	(United States) Cameron Beaubier	Tytlers Cycle Racing
3	R1	Road America, Wisconsin	May 30 – June 1	(United States) Cameron Beaubier	(United States) Cameron Beaubier	(United States) Josh Herrin	Warhorse HSBK Racing Ducati
3	R2	Road America, Wisconsin	May 30 – June 1	(United States) Cameron Beaubier	(United States) Josh Herrin	(United States) Josh Herrin	Warhorse HSBK Racing Ducati
4	R1	(Washington (state)) The Ridge Motorsports Park, Washington	June 27–29	(United States) Jake Gagne	(United States) Josh Herrin	(United States) Josh Herrin	Warhorse HSBK Racing Ducati
4	R2	(Washington (state)) The Ridge Motorsports Park, Washington	June 27–29	(United States) Jake Gagne	(United States) Cameron Beaubier	(United States) Josh Herrin	Warhorse HSBK Racing Ducati
5	R1	WeatherTech Raceway Laguna Seca, Monterey, California	July 11–13	(United States) Cameron Beaubier	(United States) Cameron Beaubier	(United States) Josh Herrin	Warhorse HSBK Racing Ducati
5	R2	WeatherTech Raceway Laguna Seca, Monterey, California	July 11–13	(United States) Cameron Beaubier	(United States) Josh Herrin	(United States) Bobby Fong	Attack Performance Progressive Yamaha Racing
5	R3	WeatherTech Raceway Laguna Seca, Monterey, California	July 11–13	(United States) Cameron Beaubier	(United States) Josh Herrin	(United States) Bobby Fong	Attack Performance Progressive Yamaha Racing
6	R1	Virginia International Raceway, Virginia	August 1–3	(United States) Bobby Fong	(United States) Cameron Beaubier	(United States) Bobby Fong	Attack Performance Progressive Yamaha Racing
6	R2	Virginia International Raceway, Virginia	August 1–3	(United States) Bobby Fong	(United States) Josh Herrin	(United States) Bobby Fong	Attack Performance Progressive Yamaha Racing
7	R1	Mid-Ohio Sports Car Course, Ohio	August 15–17	(United States) Cameron Beaubier	(United States) Cameron Beaubier	(United States) Bobby Fong	Attack Performance Progressive Yamaha Racing
7	R2	Mid-Ohio Sports Car Course, Ohio	August 15–17	(United States) Cameron Beaubier	(United States) Cameron Beaubier	(United States) Cameron Beaubier	Tytlers Cycle Racing
8	R1	Circuit of the Americas, Texas	September 12–14	(United States) Cameron Beaubier	(United States) Cameron Beaubier	(United States) Josh Herrin	Warhorse HSBK Racing Ducati
8	R2	Circuit of the Americas, Texas	September 12–14	(United States) Cameron Beaubier	(United States) Cameron Beaubier	(United States) Cameron Beaubier	Tytlers Cycle Racing
9	R1	New Jersey Motorsports Park, New Jersey	September 26–28	(United States) Bobby Fong	(United States) Bobby Fong	(United States) Bobby Fong	Attack Performance Progressive Yamaha Racing
9	R2	New Jersey Motorsports Park, New Jersey	September 26–28	(United States) Bobby Fong	(United States) Cameron Beaubier	(United States) Josh Herrin	Warhorse HSBK Racing Ducati
9	R3	New Jersey Motorsports Park, New Jersey	September 26–28	(United States) Bobby Fong	(United States) Bobby Fong	(United States) Cameron Beaubier	Tytlers Cycle Racing

== Teams and riders ==
2025 Entry List
Team	Manufacturer	No.	Rider		Rounds
Edge Racing	BMW	92	(United States) Jason Waters	C	All
Edge Racing	BMW	990	(United States) Jesse Ruehling	C	1
Ikonic Racing	BMW	191	(United States) A. J. Blackmon	C	6, 8
OrangeCat Racing	BMW	36	(United States) Jayson Uribe		9
OrangeCat Racing	BMW	67	(United States) Andrew Lee		9
Scheibe Racing	BMW	94	(Brazil) Danilo Lewis		All
Top Pro Motorsports	BMW	89	(Colombia) Alex Arango	C	2–3, 8
Tytlers Cycle Racing	BMW	6	(United States) Cameron Beaubier		All
Equipo KrissCross MMYJ	Ducati	190	(Mexico) Ivan Muñoz	C	9
Warhorse HSBK Racing Ducati	Ducati	1	(United States) Josh Herrin		All
3D Motorsports	Honda	74	(United States) Gabriel Da Silva	C	1, 3–4
Castrol/Lamkin Racing	Honda	21	(United States) Nolan Lamkin	C	5–8
Jones Honda	Honda	27	(United States) Ashton Yates		All
Limitless Racing	Honda	84	(United States) Joseph Giannotto	C	1–8
Real Steel Motorsports	Honda	69	(United States) Hayden Gillim		All
Real Steel Motorsports	Honda	95	(United States) J. D. Beach	C	All
Team Sloppy Sprockets Honda Racing	Honda	800	(United States) Trevor Watson	C	7
Team Storniolo	Kawasaki	179	(United States) Tony Storniolo	C	3
Zlock Racing	Kawasaki	121	(United States) Brian Pinkstaff		3–4
Zlock Racing	Kawasaki	232	(United States) Kevin Pinkstaff		3–4
Posse Racing	Suzuki	174	(United States) William Posse	C	7
Vision Wheel M4 ECSTAR Suzuki	Suzuki	40	(United States) Sean Dylan Kelly		All
Vision Wheel M4 ECSTAR Suzuki	Suzuki	54	(Mexico) Richie Escalante		All
Attack Performance Progressive Yamaha Racing	Yamaha	32	(United States) Jake Gagne		All
Attack Performance Progressive Yamaha Racing	Yamaha	50	(United States) Bobby Fong		All
Blackall Racing	Yamaha	100	(United States) Tony Blackall		9
BPR Racing	Yamaha	17	(United States) Bryce Kornbau		All
BPR Racing	Yamaha	194	(United States) Deion Campbell	C	All
FLO4LAW/SBU Racing	Yamaha	77	(United States) Bobby Davies	C	5–6, 8–9
FLO4LAW/SBU Racing	Yamaha	78	(United States) Benjamin Smith		All
Superbike Supply	Yamaha	900	(United States) Zachary Schumacher	C	7–8
Superbike Unlimited Racing	Yamaha	49	(Australia) Max Stauffer		8–9
Thrashed Bike Racing	Yamaha	88	(United Kingdom) Max Flinders		All

Icon	Legend
C	Superbike Cup

== Championship standings ==
=== Scoring system ===
Points are awarded to the top fifteen finishers. A rider has to finish the race to earn points.

Position	1st	2nd	3rd	4th	5th	6th	7th	8th	9th	10th	11th	12th	13th	14th	15th
Points	25	20	16	13	11	10	9	8	7	6	5	4	3	2	1

=== Riders' championship ===
Pos	Rider	Bike	ALA (Alabama)		ATL (Georgia (U.S. state))		RAM (Wisconsin)		RID (Washington (state))		MON (California)			VIR (Virginia)		OHI (Ohio)		TEX (Texas)		NJE (New Jersey)			Pts
1	(United States) Cameron Beaubier	BMW	1^{PF}	2^{P}	1^{PF}	1^{PF}	3^{PF}	Ret^{P}	2	2^{F}	6^{PF}	3^{P}	3^{P}	2^{F}	4	6^{PF}	1^{PF}	2^{PF}	1^{PF}	2	2^{F}	1	371
2	(United States) Josh Herrin	Ducati	5	3^{F}	3	3	1	1^{F}	1^{F}	1	1	2^{F}	2^{F}	3	14^{F}	7	Ret	1	3	3	1	4	346
3	(United States) Bobby Fong	Yamaha	2	5	11	2	2	2	4	8	2	1	1	1^{P}	1^{P}	1	3	3	2	1^{PF}	Ret^{P}	Ret^{PF}	339
4	(United States) Jake Gagne	Yamaha	3	1	2	5	4	8	3^{P}	3^{P}	3	5	4	5	5	4	2	10	5	5	6	7	267
5	(United States) Sean Dylan Kelly	Suzuki	4	4	4	4	Ret	14	6	16	Ret	4	Ret	4	2	2	7	5	4	4	5	2	207
6	(Mexico) Richie Escalante	Suzuki	Ret	6	6	6	5	3	5	4	5	6	5	9	3	8	6	Ret	Ret	8	3	6	188
7	(United States) J. D. Beach	Honda	8	7	8	10	Ret	5	8	7	4	7	6	6	8	3	5	6	6	11	9	8	176
8	(United States) Hayden Gillim	Honda	6	8	7	9	6	6	Ret	5	Ret	8	7	15	6	5	4	4	7	Ret	4	3	168
9	(United States) Ashton Yates	Honda	Ret	Ret	10	8	7	7	13	Ret	Ret	12	10	7	9	10	8	8	9	7	8	Ret	107
10	(United States) Bryce Kornbau	Yamaha	9	14	DNS	Ret	8	9	7	6	7	10	Ret	8	7	DSQ	10	12	Ret	10	10	12	101
11	(Brazil) Danilo Lewis	BMW	10	16	9	DNS	10	10	11	11	8	11	9	10	10	12	11	9	10	13	15	11	98
12	(United States) Benjamin Smith	Yamaha	7	Ret	5	7	DNS	4	Ret	Ret	Ret	9	8	Ret	Ret	9	9	7	8	Ret	Ret	10	94
13	(United States) Jason Waters	BMW	Ret	9	12	12	11	11	9	12	10	14	11	11	13	13	15	15	13	16	13	DNS	68
14	(United States) Deion Campbell	Yamaha	12	11	DSQ	13	13	DNS	12	10	11	15	12	14	11	DNS	Ret	13	11	12	11	9	66
15	(United Kingdom) Max Flinders	Yamaha	11	10	14	11	9	Ret	10	9	9	13	13	Ret	Ret	Ret	DNS	16	Ret	14	18	13	56
16	(United States) Joseph Giannotto	Honda	13	12	13	14	14	12	15	15	13	17	15	13	Ret	16	13	DNS	DNS				30
17	(United States) Jayson Uribe	BMW																		6	7	5	30
18	(United States) Nolan Lamkin	Honda									12	16	14	12	12	11	12	14	12				29
19	(United States) Andrew Lee	BMW																		9	12	17	11
20	(United States) Gabriel Da Silva	Honda	DNS	13			12	Ret	DNQ	DNQ													7
21	(United States) Kevin Pinkstaff	Kawasaki					15	13	Ret	13													7
22	(Australia) Max Stauffer	Yamaha																11	Ret	15	Ret	DNS	6
23	(United States) Bobby Davies	Yamaha									14	DNS	WD	DNS	Ret			DNS	Ret	17	14	14	6
24	(United States) Zachary Schumacher	Yamaha														15	14	Ret	14				5
25	(United States) Brian Pinkstaff	Kawasaki					16	15	14	14													5
26	(United States) William Posse	Suzuki														14	Ret						2
27	(United States) Tony Blackall	Yamaha																		19	16	15	1
28	(United States) Jesse Ruehling	BMW	Ret	15																			1
29	(United States) A. J. Blackmon	BMW												DNS	Ret			DNS	DNS				0
30	(Colombia) Alex Arango	BMW			DNS	DNS	DNS	DNS										DNS	DNS				0
31	(United States) Trevor Watson	Honda														17	Ret						0
32	(United States) Tony Storniolo	Kawasaki					DNS	DNS															0
33	(Mexico) Ivan Muñoz	Ducati																		18	17	16	0
Pos	Rider	Bike	ALA (Alabama)		ATL (Georgia (U.S. state))		RAM (Wisconsin)		RID (Washington (state))		MON (California)			VIR (Virginia)		OHI (Ohio)		TEX (Texas)		NJE (New Jersey)			Pts

Colour	Result
Gold	Winner
Silver	Second place
Bronze	Third place
Green	Points classification
Blue	Non-points classification
Blue	Non-classified finish (NC)
Purple	Retired, not classified (Ret)
Red	Did not qualify (DNQ)
Red	Did not pre-qualify (DNPQ)
Black	Disqualified (DSQ)
White	Did not start (DNS)
White	Withdrew (WD)
White	Race cancelled (C)
Blank	Did not practice (DNP)
Blank	Did not arrive (DNA)
Blank	Excluded (EX)

P - Pole position
F - Fastest lap

=== Superbike Cup ===
Pos	Rider	Bike	ALA (Alabama)		ATL (Georgia (U.S. state))		RAM (Wisconsin)		RID (Washington (state))		MON (California)			VIR (Virginia)		OHI (Ohio)		TEX (Texas)		NJE (New Jersey)			Pts
1	(United States) J. D. Beach	Honda	1	1	1	1	Ret	1	1	1	1	1	1	1	1	1	1	1	1	1	1	1	475
2	(United States) Jason Waters	BMW	Ret	2	2	2	1	2	2	3	2	2	2	2	4	3	5	4	4	3	3	DNS	319
3	(United States) Deion Campbell	Yamaha	2	3	DSQ	3	3	DNS	3	2	3	3	3	5	2	DNS	Ret	2	2	2	2	2	283
4	(United States) Joseph Giannotto	Honda	3	4	3	4	4	3	4	4	5	5	5	4	Ret	6	3	DNS	DNS				185
5	(United States) Nolan Lamkin	Honda									4	4	4	3	3	2	2	3	3				143
6	(United States) Bobby Davies	Yamaha									6	DNS	WD	DNS	Ret			DNS	Ret	4	4	3	52
7	(United States) Zachary Schumacher	Yamaha														5	4	Ret	5				35
8	(Mexico) Ivan Muñoz	Ducati																		5	5	4	35
9	(United States) Gabriel Da Silva	Honda	DNS	5			2	Ret	DNQ	DNQ													31
10	(United States) William Posse	Suzuki														4	Ret						13
11	(United States) Jesse Ruehling	BMW	Ret	6																			10
12	(United States) Trevor Watson	Honda														7	Ret						9
13	(Colombia) Alex Arango	BMW			DNS	DNS	DNS	DNS										DNS	DNS				0
14	(United States) A. J. Blackmon	BMW												DNS	Ret			DNS	DNS				0
15	(United States) Tony Storniolo	Kawasaki					DNS	DNS															0
Pos	Rider	Bike	ALA (Alabama)		ATL (Georgia (U.S. state))		RAM (Wisconsin)		RID (Washington (state))		MON (California)			VIR (Virginia)		OHI (Ohio)		TEX (Texas)		NJE (New Jersey)			Pts
