= Pittsburgh International Race Complex =

Auto racing complex in Wampum, Pennsylvania, United States

Pitt Race
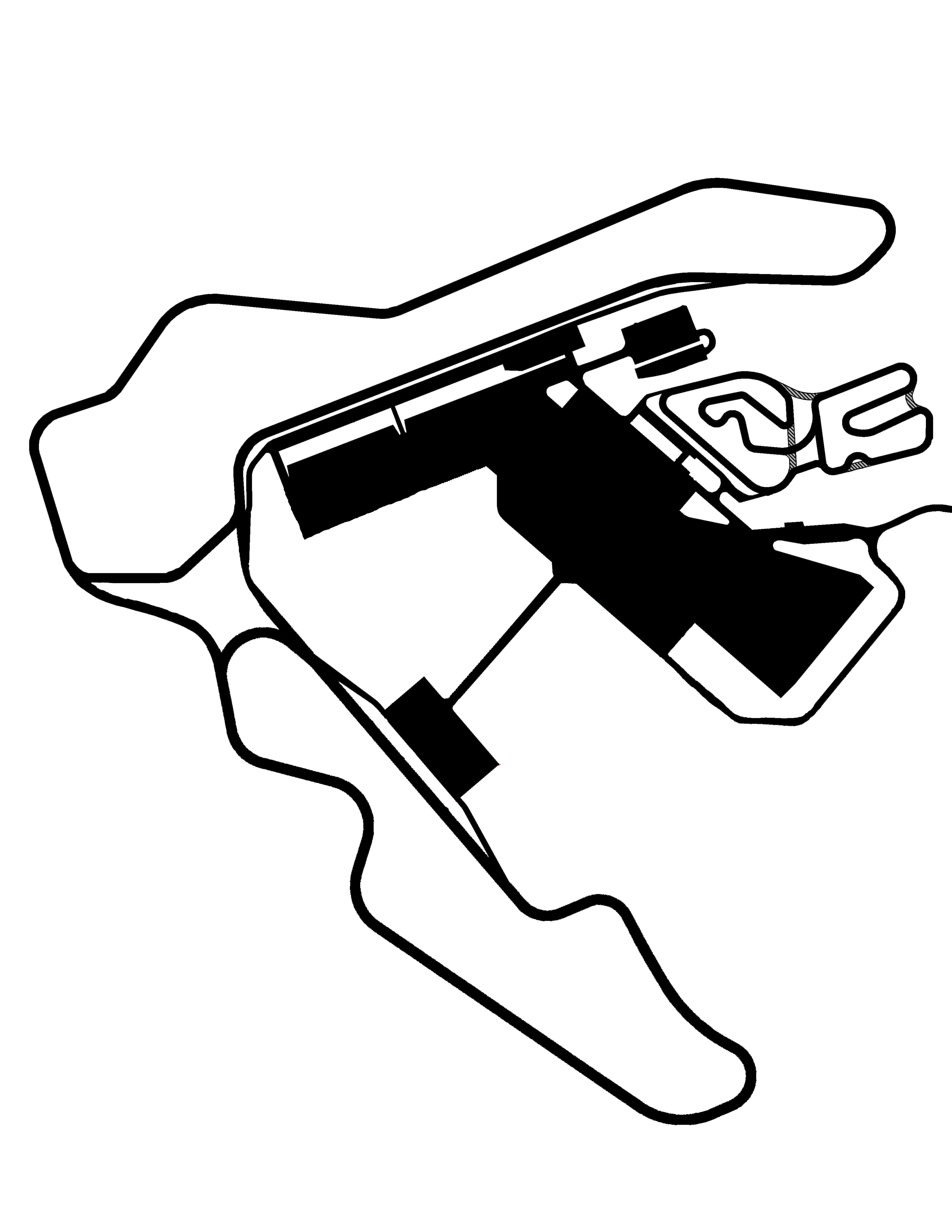
- Pittsburgh International Raceway Track Map Full Circuit (2015–2025)
- Location: 201 Pendale Road; Wampum, Pennsylvania
- Coordinates: 40°51′N 80°21′W
- Owner: Jim & Kathy Stout (2011–2025)
- Broke ground: December 2001; 24 years ago
- Opened: July 1, 2002; 24 years ago
- Closed: November 30, 2025; 11 months ago
- Architect: Alan Wilson
- Former names: BeaveRun Motorsports Complex (2002–2011)
- Major events: Atlantic Championship (2015–2025); ChampCar Endurance Series (2014–2025); PVGP Historics at Pitt Race (2004–2025); Trans-Am Series (2018, 2024); MotoAmerica (2017–2023); F3 Americas (2018–2019); F4 USA (2018–2019); MazdaSpeed Miata Cup (2003)
- Website: http://pittrace.com/

Full Circuit (2015–2025)
- Length: 2.779 mi (4.473 km)
- Turns: 19
- Race lap record: 1:31.172 ( (United States) Keith Grant, Swift 016.a, 2020, Formula Atlantic)

Motorcycle Circuit (2017–2025)
- Length: 2.781 mi (4.475 km)
- Turns: 21
- Race lap record: 1:40.550 ( (United States) Cameron Beaubier, Yamaha YZF-R1, 2020, SBK)

Original North Circuit (2002–2025)
- Length: 1.600 mi (2.575 km)
- Turns: 8

South Circuit (2015–2025)
- Length: 1.200 mi (1.931 km)
- Turns: 8

Pittsburgh International Race Complex (commonly known as Pitt Race) was an auto racing road course located in Wampum, Pennsylvania. Pitt Race hosted amateur and professional automobile, motorcycle, and karting events.

== The track ==
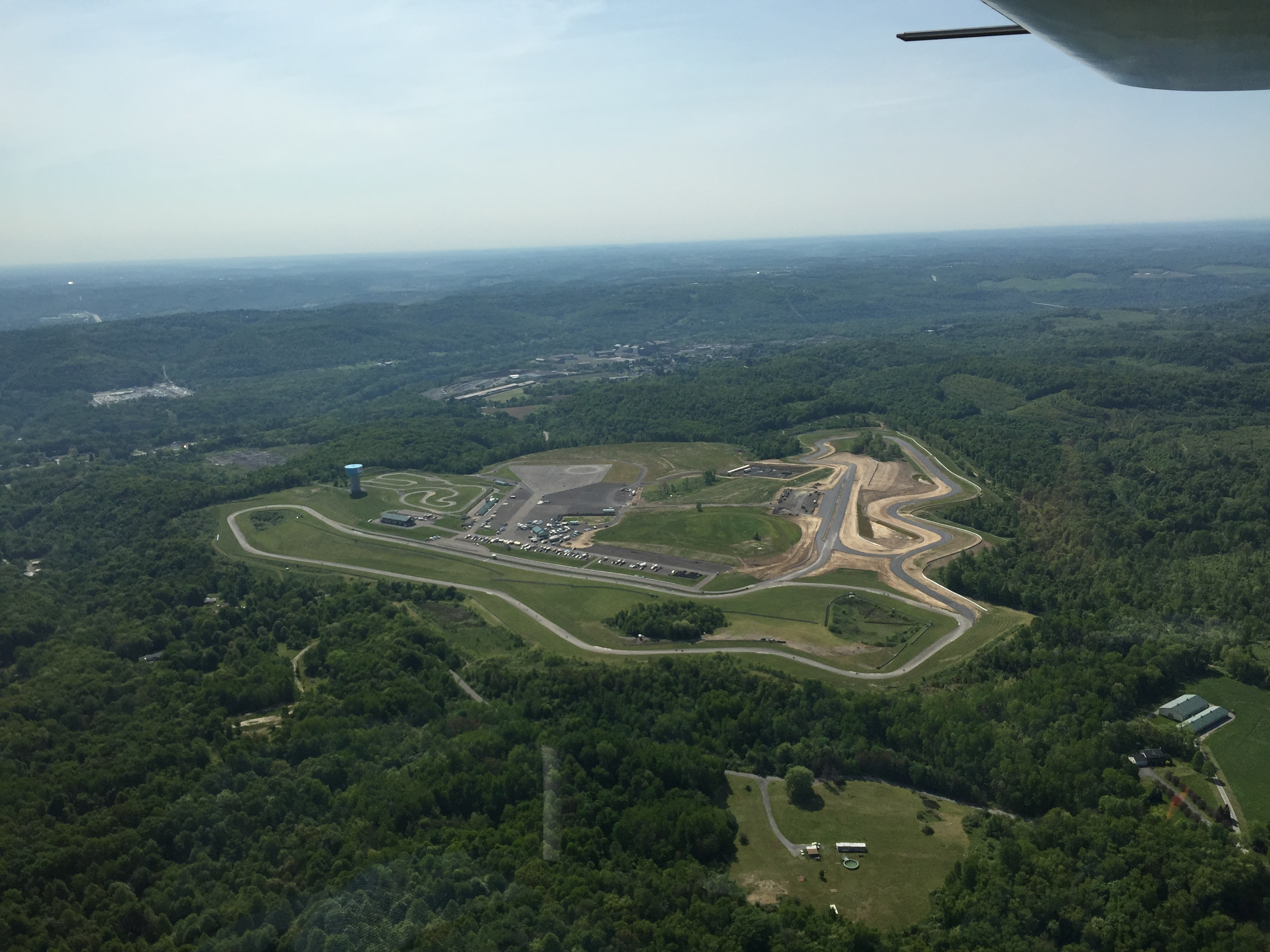
Aerial photo of the Pitt Race facility, including the South Track addition

Pittsburgh International Race Complex offered three track configurations. The North track configuration was 1.600 mi (2.575 km) and the South track covers 1.200 mi (1.931 km). The full course was 2.779 mi (4.472 km) in length and combined both the North and South track. All tracks featured significant elevation change throughout and were designed to follow the natural terrain. Pitt Race hosted many different sports car series such as SCCA and NASA, as well as holding track days and open tests for both cars and motorcycles such as N2 Track Days. From 2017 to 2023, the track also hosted the MotoAmerica Championship and it also hosted Trans-Am Series in 2018 and 2024.

The track also ran a program called Total Vehicle Control (TVC). It provided instruction in situational awareness, driving dynamics, skid control, emergency braking, and accident avoidance techniques. The program was targeted at commercial and emergency vehicle drivers as well as individuals.

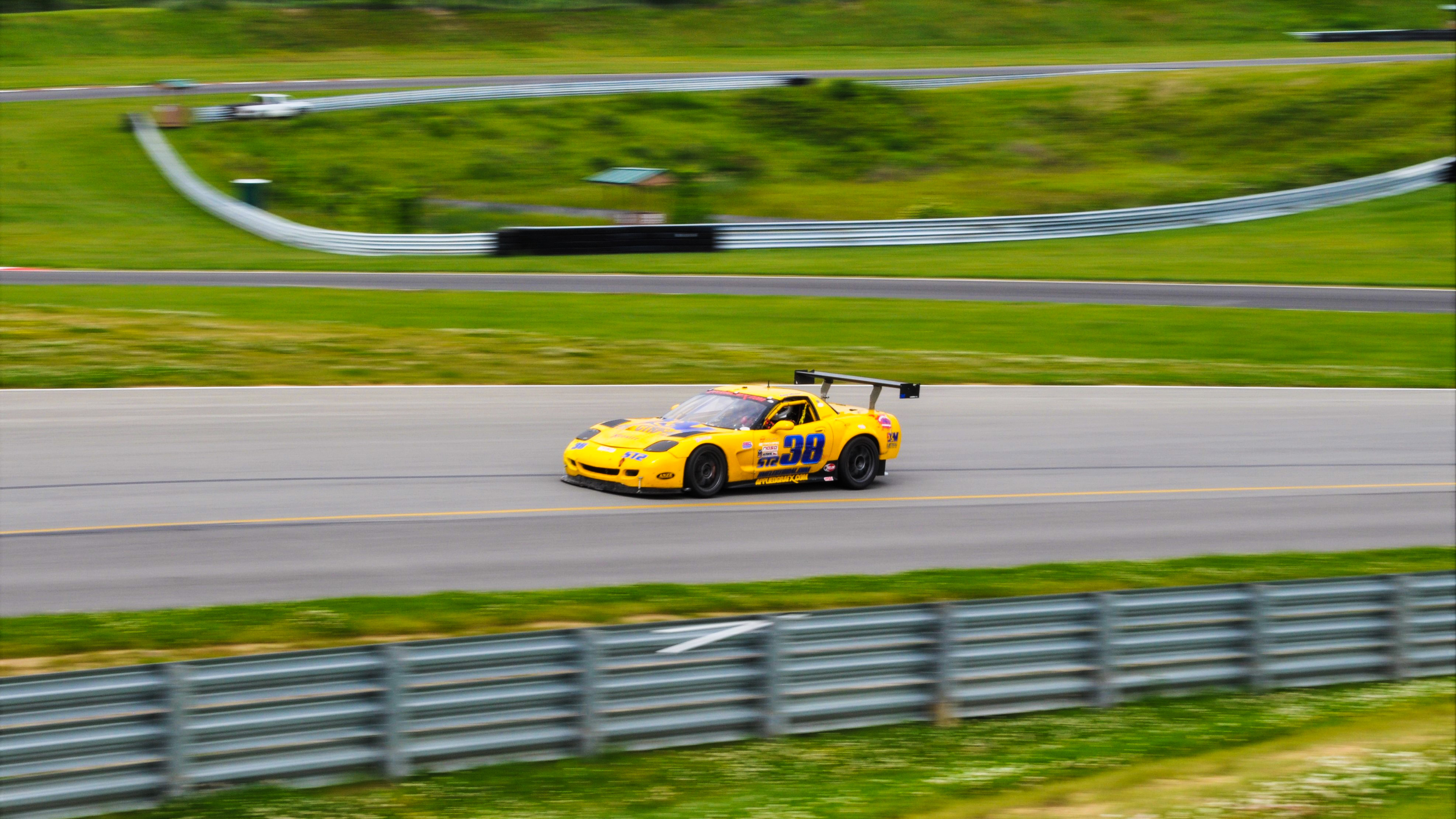
C5 Corvette at NASA Event

The 0.82 mi (1.32 km) kart track was designed by Alan Wilson. It hosted several major kart series including WKA and USPKS as well as featuring 9.5 hp (7.1 kW) rental karts.

== History ==
The idea for the track came from two area attorneys, who attracted local investors to assist in the funding for the facility. The track broke ground in December 2001. It officially opened on July 1, 2002, as BeaveRun Motorsports Complex. It included a 1.600 mi (2.575 km) road course, a 0.82 mi (1.32 km) kart track, and a six-acre skidpad used for driver training and autocross. In 2004, work began on a one-mile addition to the main track with trees being cleared and plans drawn up, but the project was put on hold in 2006. A 12,000 square-foot event center overlooking the North Track was also constructed at this time.

In 2011, the track was bought by Jim and Kathy Stout, and re-branded as "Pittsburgh International Race Complex." A three-stage renovation of the facility began soon after. The South Track addition, which added 1.200 mi (1.931 km) of track, was the largest update to the facility and was completed in 2015. It can be run as its own circuit or run combined with the North Track. An expanded Vehicle Dynamics Area was also part of the facility renovations. Both the North and South Tracks were repaved in 2017. A new timing and scoring building, located on pit lane of the north track, was also completed in 2017.

On Wednesday, October 1, 2025, the track’s owners, Jim and Kathy Stout announced that they had sold the property and would be stepping away from ownership. The circuit was closed after November 2025.

== Lap records ==
The fastest official race lap records at the Pittsburgh International Race Complex are listed as:

Category	Time	Driver	Vehicle	Event
Full Circuit (2015–2025): 2.779 mi (4.472 km)
Formula Atlantic	1:31.172	Keith Grant	Swift 016.a	2020 Pittsburgh Atlantic Championship round
Formula Regional	1:33.163	Dakota Dickerson	Ligier JS F3	2019 Pittsburgh F3 Americas round
TA1	1:38.509	Paul Menard	Ford Mustang Trans-Am	2024 Pittsburgh Trans-Am round
Formula 4	1:41.545	Joshua Car	Crawford F4-16	2018 Pittsburgh F4 United States round
TA2	1:43.634	Rafa Matos	Ford Mustang Trans-Am	2024 Pittsburgh Trans-Am round
Motorcycle Circuit (2017–2025): 2.781 mi (4.476 km)
Superbike	1:40.550	Cameron Beaubier	Yamaha YZF-R1	2020 Pittsburgh MotoAmerica round
Supersport	1:43.021	Garrett Gerloff	Yamaha YZF-R6	2017 Pittsburgh MotoAmerica round

== Gallery ==
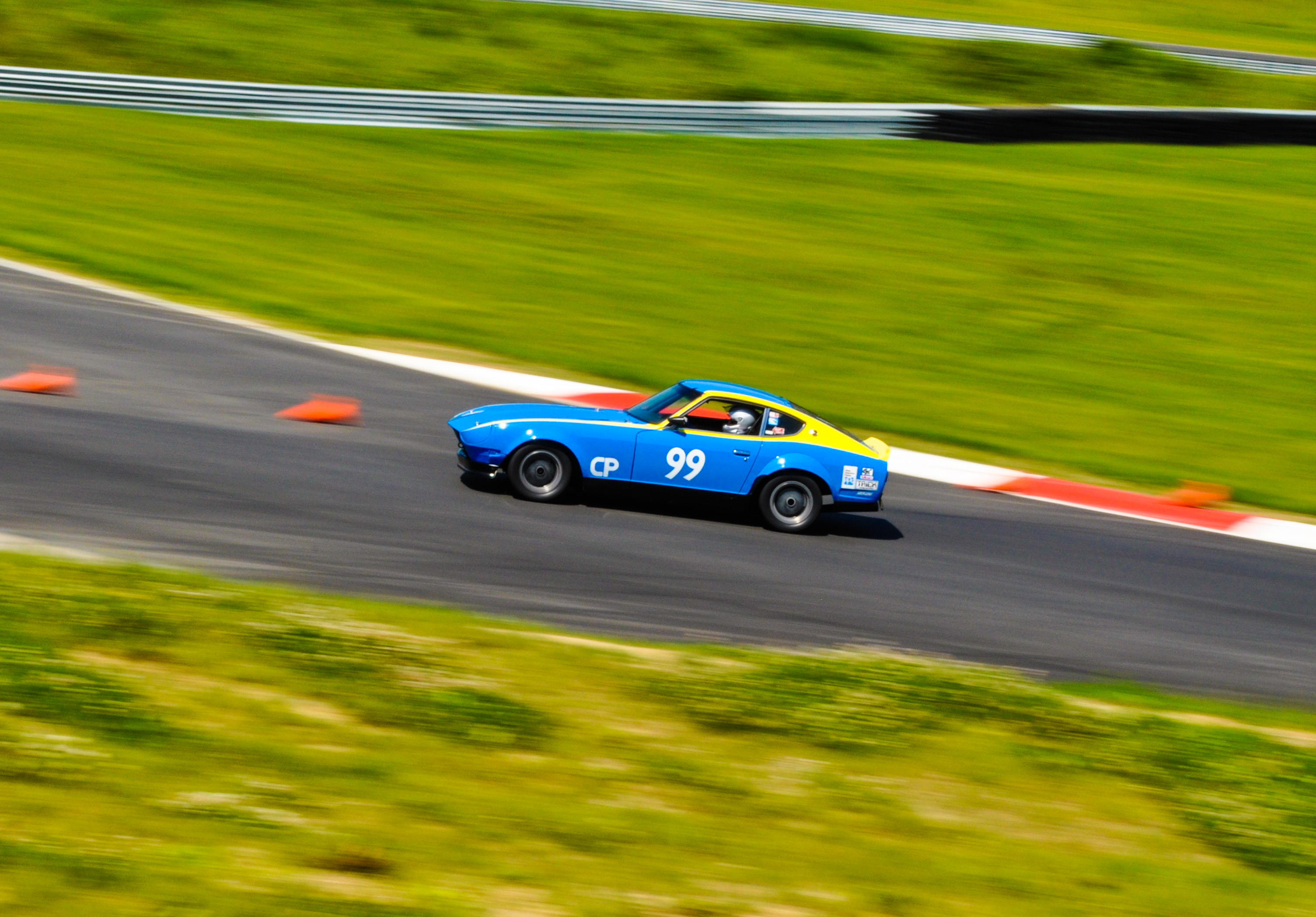
Datsun 240Z at Pittsburgh Vintage Grand Prix

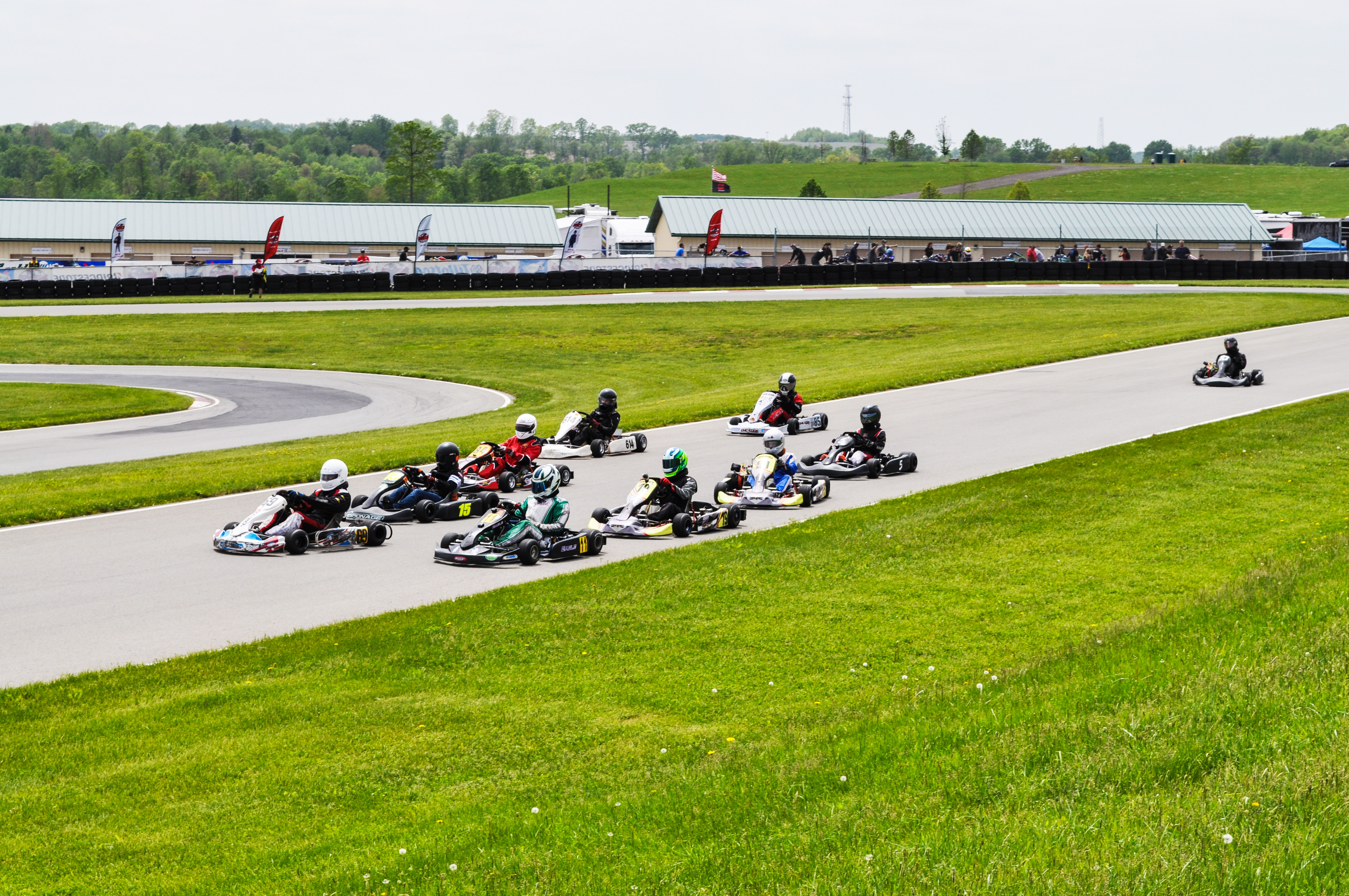
WKA Race on the Wilson Circuit

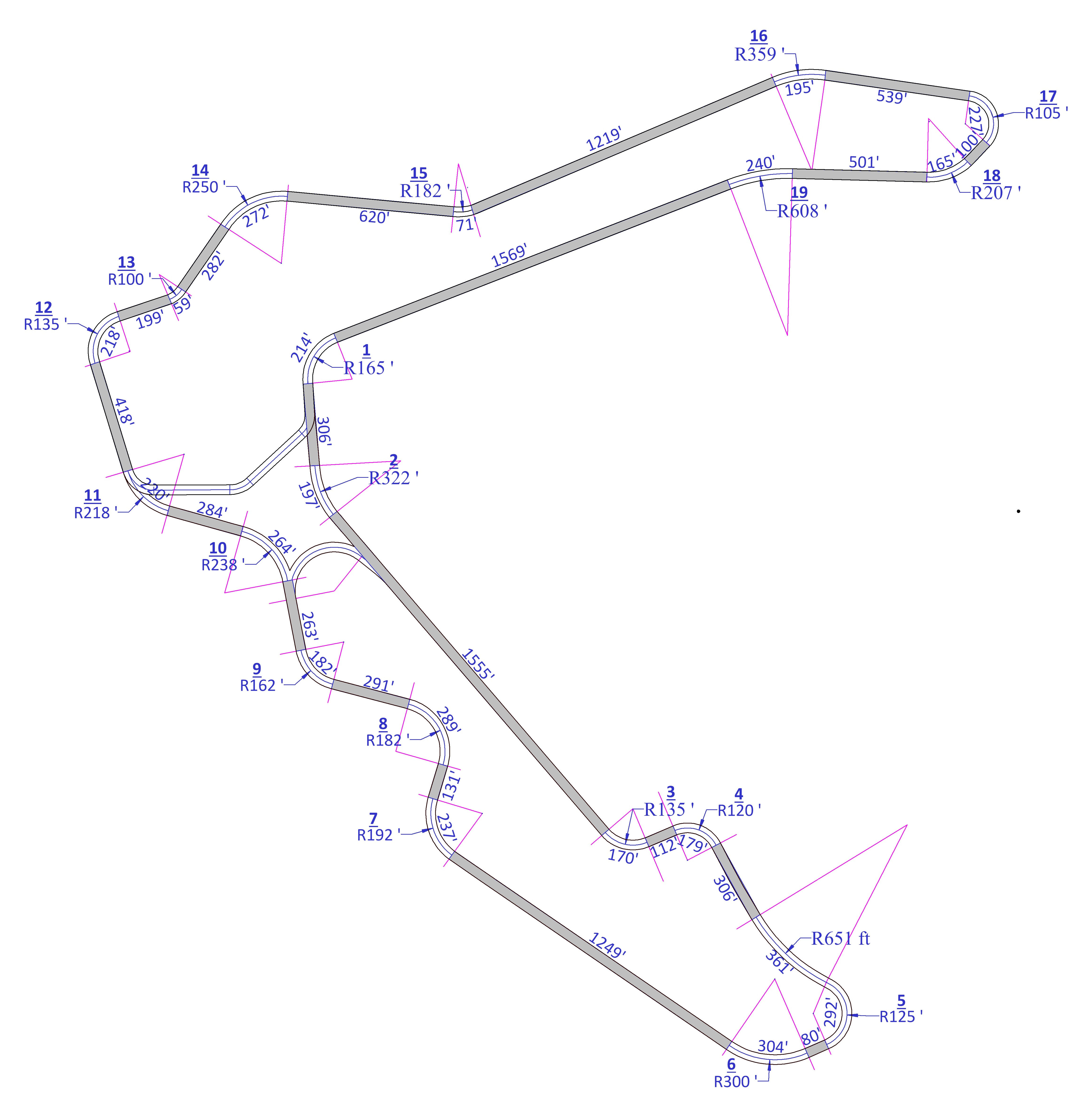
Detailed Geometry Track Map of Pitt Race

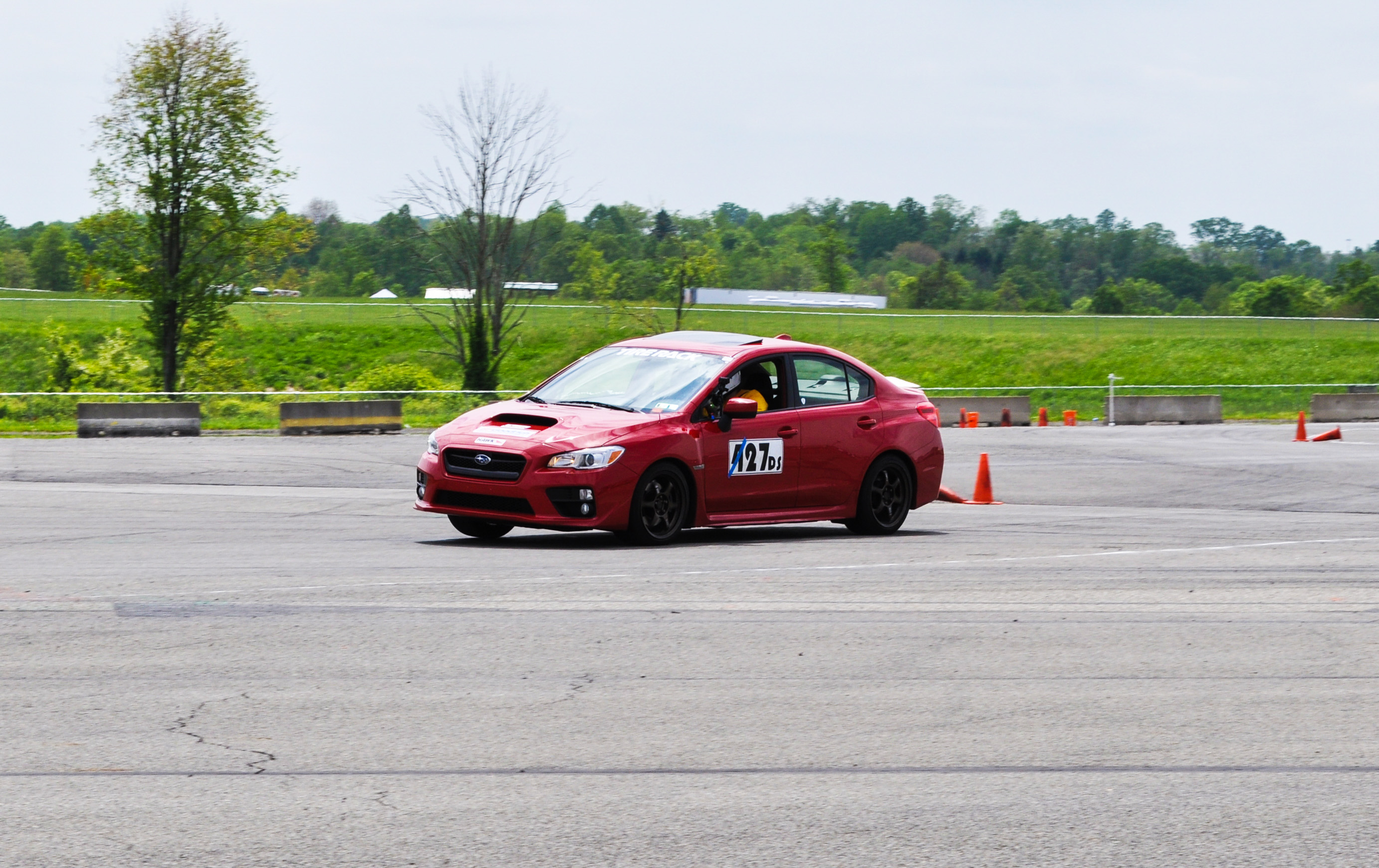
Steel City AutoX at Pitt Race
