= Cameron Beaubier =

American motorcycle racer

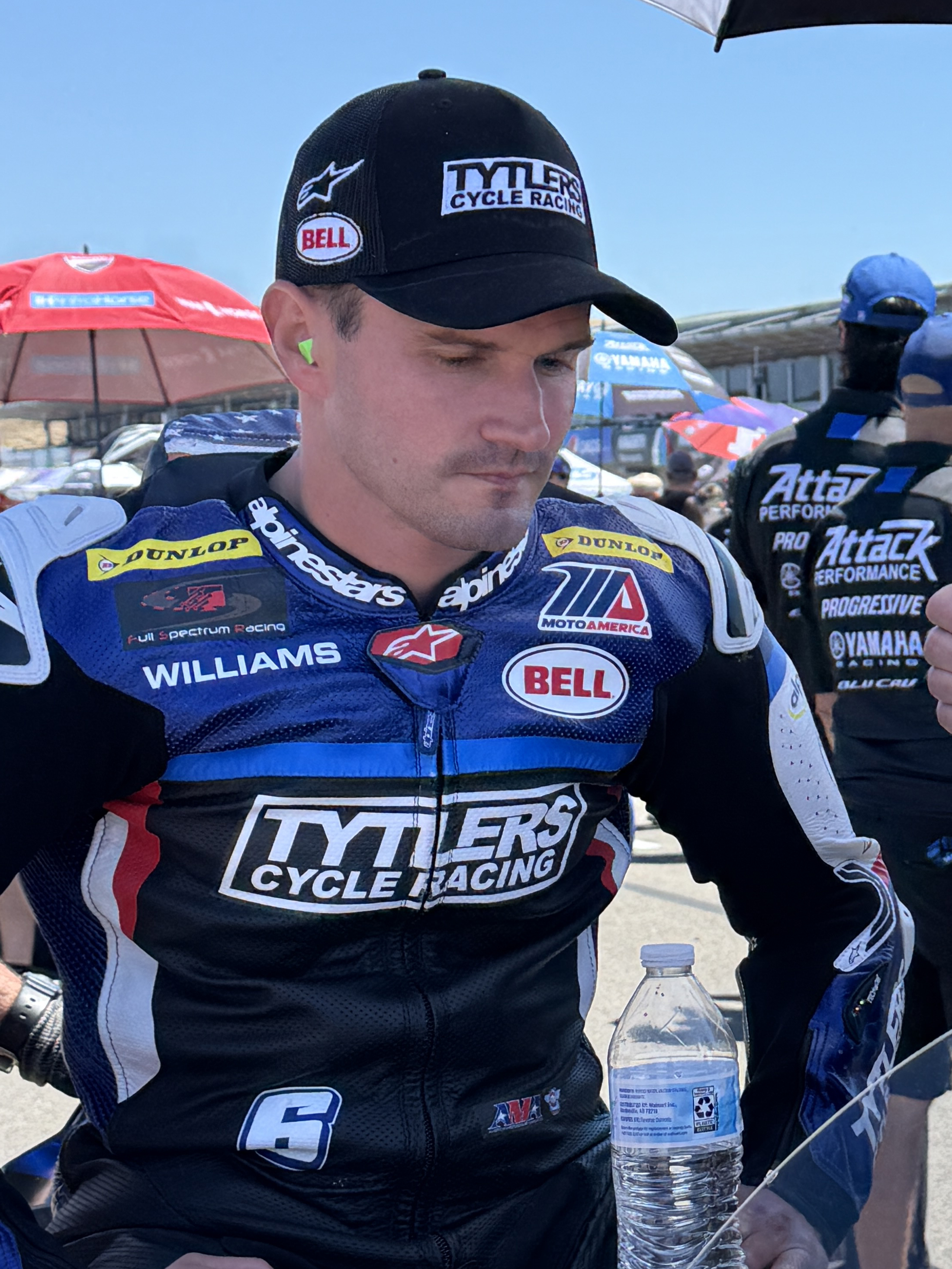
- Beaubier, on the grid for Race 1 at Laguna Seca in 2025.
- Born: December 6, 1992 (age 33); Roseville, California, U.S.
- Current team: Warhorse HSBK Ducati
- Bike number: 6
Motorcycle racing career statistics
Moto2 World Championship
Active years	2021–2022
Manufacturers	Kalex
Championships	0
2022 championship position	17th (73 pts)
Starts / Wins / Podiums / Poles / F. laps / Points; 38 / 0 / 0 / 1 / 2 / 123
125cc World Championship
Active years	2009
Manufacturers	KTM
Championships	0
2009 championship position	29th (3 pts)
Starts / Wins / Podiums / Poles / F. laps / Points; 14 / 0 / 0 / 0 / 0 / 3
Superbike World Championship
Active years	2016
Manufacturers	Yamaha
Championships	0
2016 championship position	26th (6 pts)
Starts / Wins / Podiums / Poles / F. laps / Points; 2 / 0 / 0 / 0 / 0 / 6

Cameron Charles Beaubier (born December 6, 1992) is an American motorcycle roadracer. He has won the MotoAmerica Superbike championship six times, placing him in second for American Superbike championships, behind Mat Mladin, with seven. In 2021 and 2022, he rode a Kalex in the Moto2 World Championship.

== Career ==
=== Early career ===
After competing in the 2007 Red Bull MotoGP Rookies Cup, Beaubier was selected to join the Red Bull MotoGP Academy; in 2008 he raced in the 125cc Spanish CEV Championship and in 2009 he had a full season in the 125cc World Championship. During this time, he was a teammate of future MotoGP champion Marc Marquez.

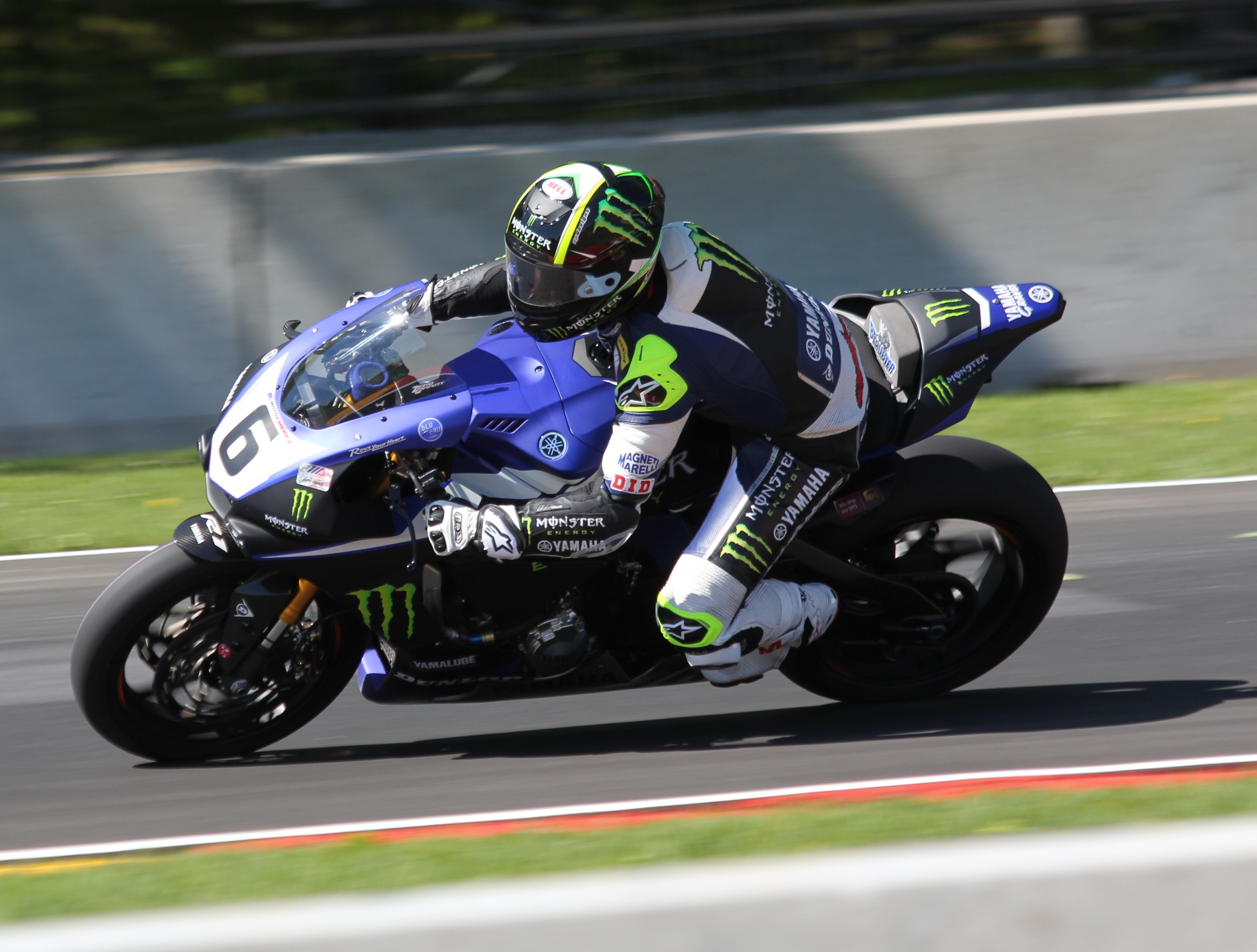
Cameron Beaubier Road America 2015

=== Racing in the United States ===
Beaubier returned to the U.S., where he contested the AMA Supersport East Championship in 2010 and the AMA Pro Daytona Sportbike Championship from 2011 to 2013, where he won the title and the Daytona 200. From 2014, Beaubier competed in the AMA Superbike Championship, winning five championships—2015, 2016, 2018, 2019, and 2020—with the newly reorganized AMA series, MotoAmerica, led by multiple World Champion, Wayne Rainey, alongside Terry Karges, Chuck Aksland, and Richard Varner.

In 2016, Beaubier joined future teammate, J.D. Beach, and Garrett Gerloff as a guest instructor at the Yamaha Champions Riding School.

=== Return to Grand Prix motorcycle racing ===
After winning his fifth—and third consecutive—Superbike Championship in 2020, Beaubier signed a two-year deal to race in the Moto2 World Championship for American Racing, marking his return to Grand Prix racing and replacing fellow American Joe Roberts. He was coached by American Racing team manager, former MotoGP rider John Hopkins.

=== Return to the United States ===
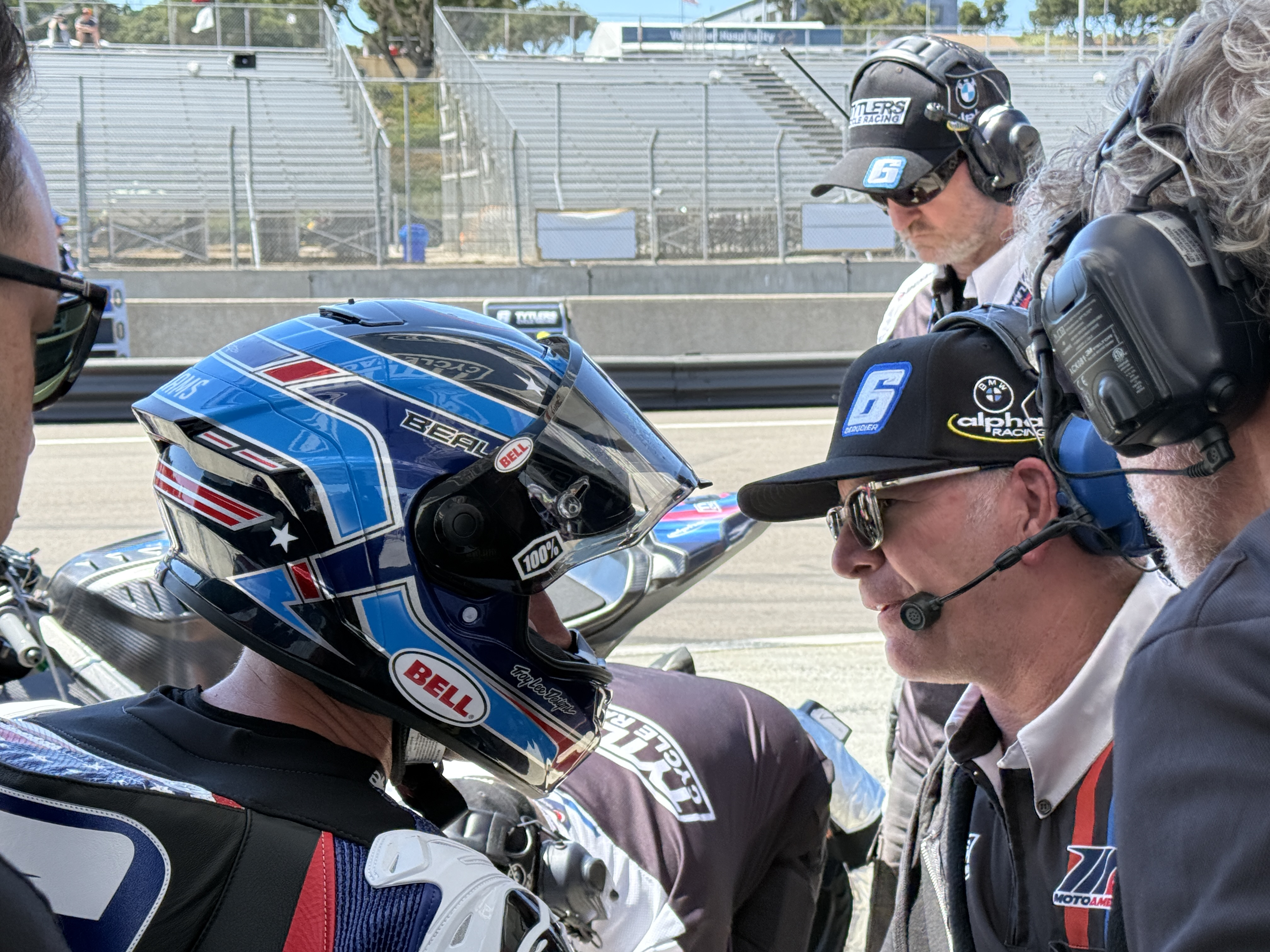
Cameron Beaubier consults with Tytler's Cycle Racing crew chief, Dave Weaver, during a qualifying session at the Laguna Seca race. (2025)

After his hiatus in Moto2, Beaubier returned to MotoAmerica competition with Tytler's Cycle Racing in 2023, alongside PJ Jacobsen and Corey Alexander. Former Superbike rider, Jake Zemke, served as his riding coach. After two injury-hampered seasons, and now with no teammates to support him, Beaubier and the Tytler's team managed to win the 2025 Superbike Championship for Beaubier's sixth Superbike championship. He claimed the title in the final race of the season at New Jersey Motorsports Park.

Following the dissolution of Tytler's Cycle Racing at the end of 2025, it was announced that Beaubier would ride for the Warhorse HSBK Ducati team in the Superbike class with MotoAmerica in 2026. Beaubier will be joined by rider Benjamin Smith, who brings along Flo4Law sponsorship to the team.

== Career statistics ==
=== Career highlights ===
- 2015: 1st, MotoAmerica Superbike championship
- 2016: 1st, MotoAmerica Superbike championship
- 2018: 1st, MotoAmerica Superbike championship
- 2019: 1st, MotoAmerica Superbike championship
- 2020: 1st, MotoAmerica Superbike championship
- 2025: 1st, MotoAmerica Superbike championship

=== Red Bull MotoGP Rookies Cup ===
==== Races by year ====
(key) (Races in bold indicate pole position, races in italics indicate fastest lap)

Year	1	2	3	4	5	6	7	8	Pos	Pts
2007	SPA; 15	ITA; Ret	GBR; 6	NED; 2	GER; 1	**CZE**; Ret	POR; 2	VAL; 15	6th	79

=== Grand Prix motorcycle racing ===
==== By season ====
Season	Class	Motorcycle	Team	Race	Win	Podium	Pole	FLap	Pts	Plcd
2009	125cc	KTM	Red Bull KTM Moto Sport	14	0	0	0	0	3	29th
2021	Moto2	Kalex	American Racing	18	0	0	0	1	50	15th
2022	Moto2	Kalex	American Racing	20	0	0	1	1	73	17th
Total				**52**	**0**	**0**	**1**	**2**	**126**	

==== By class ====
Class	Seasons	1st GP	1st Pod	1st Win	Race	Win	Podiums	Pole	FLap	Pts	WChmp
125cc	2009	2009 Qatar			14	0	0	0	0	3	0
Moto2	2021–2022	2021 Qatar			38	0	0	1	2	123	0
Total	2009, 2021–2022				**52**	**0**	**0**	**1**	**2**	**126**	**0**

==== Races by year ====
(key) (Races in bold indicate pole position; races in italics indicate fastest lap)

Year	Class	Bike	1	2	3	4	5	6	7	8	9	10	11	12	13	14	15	16	17	18	19	20	Pos	Pts
2009	125cc	KTM	QAT; 16	JPN; 16	SPA; 15	FRA; Ret	ITA; DNQ	CAT; 18	NED; Ret	GER; 14	GBR; Ret	CZE; DNS	INP; 19	RSM; 22	POR; Ret	AUS; Ret	MAL; 17	VAL; Ret					29th	3
2021	Moto2	Kalex	QAT; 11	DOH; Ret	POR; 9	SPA; Ret	FRA; Ret	ITA; 8	CAT; 19	GER; 10	NED; 16	STY; Ret	AUT; 20	GBR; Ret	ARA; 14	RSM; 21	AME; 5	EMI; Ret	ALR; 5	VAL; 21			15th	50
2022	Moto2	Kalex	QAT; 9	INA; 12	ARG; 11	**AME**; Ret	POR; Ret	SPA; Ret	FRA; 4	ITA; 7	CAT; Ret	GER; 14	NED; Ret	GBR; Ret	AUT; 13	RSM; 14	ARA; 11	JPN; 11	THA; Ret	AUS; 7	MAL; 7	VAL; Ret	17th	73

=== Superbike World Championship ===
==== Races by year ====
(key) (Races in bold indicate pole position; races in italics indicate fastest lap)

Year	Bike	1		2		3		4		5		6		7		8		9		10		11		12		13		Pos.	Pts
Year	Bike	R1	R2	R1	R2	R1	R2	R1	R2	R1	R2	R1	R2	R1	R2	R1	R2	R1	R2	R1	R2	R1	R2	R1	R2	R1	R2	Pos.	Pts
2016	Yamaha	AUS	AUS	THA	THA	SPA	SPA	NED	NED	ITA	ITA	MAL	MAL	GBR; Ret	GBR; 10	ITA	ITA	USA	USA	GER	GER	FRA	FRA	SPA	SPA	QAT	QAT	26th	6

=== MotoAmerica SuperBike Championship ===
==== Results ====
Year	Class	Team	1		2			3		4		5			6		7			8			9			10		Pos	Pts
Year	Class	Team	R1	R2	R1	R2	R3	R1	R2	R1	R2	R1	R2	R3	R1	R2	R1	R2	R3	R1	R2	R3	R1	R2	R3	R1	R2	Pos	Pts
2019	SuperBike	Yamaha	ATL; 1	ATL; 3	COA; 2	COA; 3		VIR; 1	VIR; Ret	RAM; 2	RAM; 2	UMC; 4	UMC; 2		LGS; 3	LGS; 3	SON; Ret	SON; 1		PIT; 2	PIT; 2		NJR; 2	NJR; 1		BAR; 1	BAR; 1	**1st**	**367**
2020	SuperBike	Yamaha	**RAM**; 1	**RAM**; 1	**RAM**; 1	**RAM**; Ret		**ATL**; 1	**ATL**; 1	**PIT**; 1	**PIT**; 1	TRD; 1	TRD; 1		**NJR**; 1	**NJR**; 1	**ALA**; 1	**ALA**; 1		BRI; Ret	BRI; 3	BRI; 2	**LGS**; 1	**LGS**; 1	**LGS**; 1	-	-	1st	436
2023	SuperBike	BMW	ATL; 1	ATL; 2	BAR; 4	BAR; 3		RAM; 1	RAM; Ret	RID; 7	RID; 1	**LGS**; DNS	**LGS**; 1	**LGS**; 1	**BRA**; Ret	**BRA**; DNS	PIT; 2	PIT; Ret	PIT; DNS	TEX	TEX		NJR	NJR		-	-	6th	203
2024	SuperBike	BMW	ATL; 1	ATL; 2	**ALA**; Ret	**ALA**; 1	**ALA**; 1	**RAM**; Ret	RAM; DNS	BRA	BRA	RID; Ret	RID; 8		MON; 1	MON; 2	OHI; 2	OHI; 3		TEX; 1	TEX; 2	TEX; 1	NJR; 4	NJR; 4		-	-	2nd	280
2025	SuperBike	BMW	**ALA**; 1	ALA; 2	**ATL**; 1	ATL'; 1		**RAM**; 3	RAM; Ret	RID; 2	RID; 2	**MON**; 6	MON; 3	MON; 3	VIR; 2	VIR; 4	OHI; 6	OHI; 1		TEX; 2	TEX; 1		NJR; 2	NJR; 2	NJR; 1	-	-	1st	371

Preceded by Martín Cárdenas	AMA Daytona Sportbike champion 2013	Succeeded by Jacob Gagne
Preceded by Josh Hayes	MotoAmerica Superbike champion 2015–2016	Succeeded by Toni Elías
Preceded by Toni Elías	MotoAmerica Superbike champion 2018–2020	Succeeded by Incumbent
