= Garrett Gerloff =

American motorcycle racer

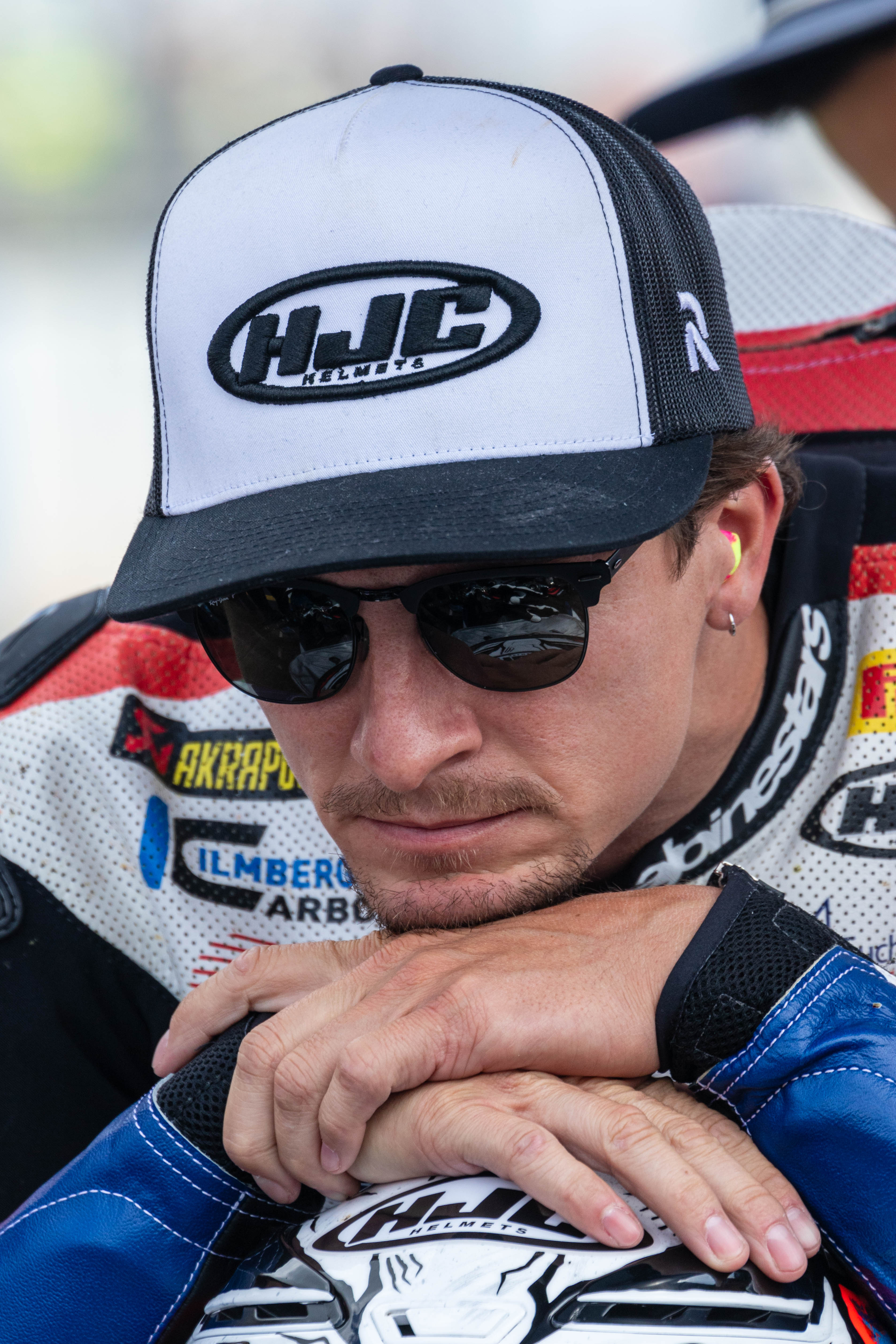
- Garrett Gerloff, Donington World Superbike 2024
- Born: August 1, 1995 (age 31); Spring, Texas
- Current team: Kawasaki WorldSBK Team
- Bike number: 31
Motorcycle racing career statistics
MotoGP World Championship
Active years	2020–2021
Manufacturers	Yamaha
Championships	0
2021 championship position	17th (0 pts)
Starts / Wins / Podiums / Poles / F. laps / Points; 1 / 0 / 0 / 0 / 0 / 0
Superbike World Championship
Active years	2020–
Manufacturers	Yamaha (2020–2022); BMW (2023–2024); Kawasaki (2025–)
Championships	0
2026 championship position	10th (165 pts)
Starts / Wins / Podiums / Poles / F. laps / Points; 234 / 0 / 8 / 1 / 0 / 1046

Garrett James Gerloff (born August 1, 1995) is an American motorcycle racer who has competed in the Superbike World Championship since 2020.

He was a two-time MotoAmerica champion in the Supersport class after taking first place overall in 2016 and 2017.

== Career ==
=== Early career ===
Beginning in 2007, Gerloff began competing in the Western Eastern Roadracing Association (WERA). By the 2010 and 2011 seasons, he was competing and finishing first and second overall in the Superbike and Superstock categories on a Yamaha 600.

Following success in the WERA national series, Gerloff stepped up to the AMA Daytona Sportbike Championship in 2011 and 2012 beginning in the regional series before moving into the national competition in 2013. In his two years in the Daytona Sportbike Championship, he finished third in 2013 and sixth in 2014. When MotoAmerica took the place as the national road racing competition, Gerloff landed in the MotoAmerica Supersport class in 2015, finishing third on his first attempt. He become champion in the Supersport class in 2016 and 2017.

=== MotoAmerica Superbike Championship ===
Gerloff's success in Supersport earned him a seat with the factory Yamaha team for the 2018 season in the MotoAmerica Superbike Championship. Gerloff finished the season with five podiums and fifth overall in the season standings. Gerloff earned his first Superbike win at Laguna Seca on July 14, 2019. In 2019, he achieved four wins overall and 11 podiums from 20 races. He ultimately finished third in the 2019 overall standings behind Cameron Beaubier and Toni Elias, 51 points behind the champion.

=== Superbike World Championship ===
Gerloff's performances in MotoAmerica lead to a move to the factory-supported GRT Yamaha WorldSBK Junior Team in the 2020 Superbike World Championship. Gerloff finished the season with two third places in Catalunya and Estoril. He ended the year in 11th place with 103 points. He was subsequently signed to a further season with the GRT Yamaha team.

Gerloff made further progress in his second year in World Superbike and was signed to another one year contract to compete with GRT Yamaha WorldSBK team in 2022. He did not record any wins on the season but he increased his number of podium finishes and was a consistent top-five finisher throughout most of 2021, though he briefly incurred controversy when he crashed into Factory Yamaha rider Toprak Razgatlioglu at Assen. His improved results helped the GRT Yamaha WorldSBK Team clinch the Independent Team's Championship while Gerloff himself clinched the Independent Rider's Championship as the highest scoring rider not riding for a factory team.

From 2023 season, Gerloff joined Bonovo Action BMW Team.

=== MotoGP World Championship ===
After delays to Valentino Rossi's SARS-CoV-2 recovery in November 2020, Gerloff was announced initially to replace Rossi at the European Grand Prix. Gerloff completed the Friday free practice sessions, before Rossi's negative tests allowed his return to the third practice session on Saturday, and Gerloff was subsequently withdrawn from the race weekend.

Gerloff made his MotoGP race debut at the 2021 Dutch TT riding for the Sepang Racing Yamaha team as a replacement for the injured Franco Morbidelli. He was the first American to race in the premier class since his idol Nicky Hayden's last outing in 2016. Gerloff did not get to ride the newest YZR-M1, instead riding Morbidelli's 'A-Spec' 2019 version. Gerloff finished the race in seventeenth position.

== Career statistics ==
=== MotoAmerica Superbike Championship ===
==== By season ====
Season	Class	Motorcycle	Team	Race	Win	Podium	Pts	Plcd
2018	SBK	Yamaha	Yamaha Factory Team	19	0	0	208	5th
2019	SBK	Yamaha	Yamaha Factory Team	19	4	11	316	**3rd**
Total				**38**	**4**	**11**	**524**	

==== Races by year ====
Year	Class	Team	1		2		3		4		5		6		7		8			9			10		Pos	Pts
Year	Class	Team	R1	R2	R1	R2	R1	R2	R1	R2	R1	R2	R1	R2	R1	R2	R1	R2	R3	R1	R2	R3	R1	R2	Pos	Pts
2019	SuperBike	Yamaha	ATL; Ret	ATL; 9	COA; 3	COA; 4	VIR; 3	VIR; 2	RAM; 3	RAM; 3	UMC; 3	UMC; 3	LGS; 2	LGS; 1	SON; 1	SON; 2	PIT; 1	PIT; 1		NJR; Ret	NJR; 1		BAR; 2	BAR; 2	3rd	316

=== Grand Prix motorcycle racing ===
==== By season ====
Season	Class	Motorcycle	Team	Race	Win	Podium	Pole	FLap	Pts	Plcd
2020	MotoGP	Yamaha YZR-M1	Monster Energy Yamaha MotoGP	0	0	0	0	0	0	NC
2021	MotoGP	Yamaha YZR-M1	Petronas Yamaha SRT	1	0	0	0	0	0	29th
Total				**1**	**0**	**0**	**0**	**0**	**0**	

==== By class ====
Class	Seasons	1st GP	1st pod	1st win	Race	Win	Podiums	Pole	FLap	Pts	WChmp
MotoGP	2020–2021	2021 Netherlands			1	0	0	0	0	0	0
Total	2020–2021				**1**	**0**	**0**	**0**	**0**	**0**	**0**

==== Races by year ====
(key) (Races in bold indicate pole position, races in italics indicate fastest lap)

Year	Class	Bike	1	2	3	4	5	6	7	8	9	10	11	12	13	14	15	16	17	18	Pos	Pts
2020	MotoGP	Yamaha	SPA	ANC	CZE	AUT	STY	RSM	EMI	CAT	FRA	ARA	TER	EUR; WD	VAL	POR					NC	0
2021	MotoGP	Yamaha	QAT	DOH	POR	SPA	FRA	ITA	CAT	GER	NED; 17	STY	AUT	GBR	ARA	RSM	AME	EMI	ALR	VAL	29th	0

=== Superbike World Championship ===
==== By season ====
Season	Motorcycle	Team	Race	Win	Podium	Pole	FLap	Pts	Plcd
2020	Yamaha YZF-R1	GRT Yamaha WorldSBK Junior Team	22	0	3	0	0	103	11th
2021	Yamaha YZF-R1	GRT Yamaha WorldSBK Team	37	0	2	0	0	228	7th
2022	Yamaha YZF-R1	GRT Yamaha WorldSBK Team	33	0	1	0	0	142	11th
2023	BMW M1000RR	Bonovo Action BMW	36	0	0	1	0	144	12th
2024	BMW M1000RR	Bonovo Action BMW	36	0	2	0	0	176	9th
2025	Kawasaki Ninja ZX-10RR	Kawasaki WorldSBK Team	34	0	0	0	0	88	15th
2026	Kawasaki Ninja ZX-10RR	Kawasaki WorldSBK Team	36	0	0	0	0	165	10th
Total			**234**	**0**	**8**	**1**	**0**	**1046**	

==== Races by year ====
(key) (Races in bold indicate pole position; races in italics indicate fastest lap)

Year	Bike	1			2			3			4			5			6			7			8			9			10			11			12			13			Pos	Pts
Year	Bike	R1	SR	R2	R1	SR	R2	R1	SR	R2	R1	SR	R2	R1	SR	R2	R1	SR	R2	R1	SR	R2	R1	SR	R2	R1	SR	R2	R1	SR	R2	R1	SR	R2	R1	SR	R2	R1	SR	R2	Pos	Pts
2020	Yamaha	AUS; 14	AUS; DNS	AUS; DNS	SPA; 11	SPA; 8	SPA; 10	POR; 14	POR; 10	POR; 11	SPA; Ret	SPA; 13	SPA; 10	SPA; 11	SPA; 13	SPA; 10	SPA; 8	SPA; 5	SPA; 3	FRA; Ret	FRA; 8	FRA; 8	POR; 3	POR; 2	POR; Ret																11th	103
2021	Yamaha	SPA; 9	SPA; 3	SPA; 7	POR; 4	POR; 4	POR; Ret	ITA; 12	ITA; 8	ITA; 5	GBR; 7	GBR; 5	GBR; 2	NED; 6	NED; 8	NED; Ret	CZE; 6	CZE; 6	CZE; 8	SPA; 9	SPA; 9	SPA; Ret	FRA; 11	FRA; 13	FRA; 9	SPA; Ret	SPA; 8	SPA; 7	SPA; 10	SPA; C	SPA; 10	POR; 6	POR; 8	POR; 5	ARG; 7	ARG; 7	ARG; 8	INA; 11	INA; C	INA; 6	7th	228
2022	Yamaha	SPA; 9	SPA; 10	SPA; 9	NED; 8	NED; 7	NED; Ret	POR; DNS	POR; DNS	POR; DNS	ITA; 8	ITA; 9	ITA; Ret	GBR; 7	GBR; 10	GBR; 11	CZE; 10	CZE; 9	CZE; 18	FRA; 5	FRA; 8	FRA; 8	SPA; 3	SPA; 10	SPA; Ret	POR; 10	POR; Ret	POR; 9	ARG; 13	ARG; 13	ARG; 12	INA; 7	INA; 13	INA; 8	AUS; 6	AUS; 7	AUS; Ret				11th	142
2023	BMW	AUS; 10	AUS; 15	AUS; 14	INA; 14	INA; 12	INA; 11	NED; 12	NED; 17	NED; 12	SPA; 9	SPA; 7	SPA; 10	ITA; 13	ITA; 9	ITA; 8	GBR; 7	GBR; Ret	GBR; 9	ITA; 13	ITA; Ret	ITA; 13	CZE; Ret	CZE; 9	CZE; 20	**FRA**; 4	**FRA**; Ret	FRA; 5	SPA; 8	SPA; 9	SPA; 10	POR; 4	POR; 8	POR; 4	SPA; 14	SPA; Ret	SPA; 9				12th	144
2024	BMW	AUS; 9	AUS; 13	AUS; 9	SPA; 12	SPA; 17	SPA; 10	NED; 16	NED; 11	NED; 12	ITA; 12	ITA; Ret	ITA; 18	GBR; 14	GBR; 14	GBR; 13	CZE; 8	CZE; 12	CZE; 12	POR; 4	POR; 11	POR; 8	FRA; 12	FRA; 6	FRA; 3	ITA; 8	ITA; 9	ITA; 4	SPA; 3	SPA; 5	SPA; 5	POR; 6	POR; 11	POR; Ret	SPA; 10	SPA; 8	SPA; 7				9th	176
2025	Kawasaki	AUS; Ret	AUS; Ret	AUS; 13	POR; 12	POR; 16	POR; 12	NED; 13	NED; 16	NED; 16	ITA; 15	ITA; 15	ITA; 12	CZE; 11	CZE; 12	CZE; 10	EMI; 14	EMI; 11	EMI; 8	GBR; 8	GBR; 8	GBR; 6	HUN; 9	HUN; DNS	HUN; DNS	FRA; Ret	FRA; 14	FRA; 11	ARA; 15	ARA; 15	ARA; 14	POR; 10	POR; 12	POR; 11	SPA; 14	SPA; 17	SPA; Ret				15th	88
2026	Kawasaki	AUS; 11	AUS; 6	AUS; 10	POR; 7	POR; 14	POR; Ret	NED; 16	NED; 14	NED; 18	HUN; 13	HUN; 8	HUN; 5	CZE; 4	CZE; 6	CZE; 5	ARA; 9	ARA; 12	ARA; 6	EMI; 14	EMI; 14	EMI; 12	GBR; 8	GBR; 9	GBR; 6	FRA; 9	FRA; 13	FRA; 7	ITA; 5	ITA; Ret	ITA; 8	POR; 10	POR; 18	POR; 7	SPA; 14	SPA; 13	SPA; 13				10th	165

* Season still in progress.
