= New Jersey Motorsports Park =

Motorsports race track in Millville, New Jersey

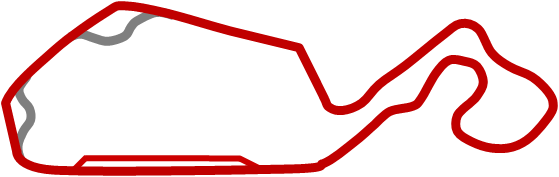
- Thunderbolt Raceway (2008–present)

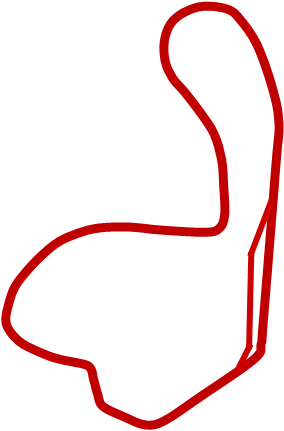
- Lightning Raceway (2008–present)
- Location: 8000 Dividing Creek Road, Millville, Cumberland County New Jersey
- Coordinates: 39°21′32.29″N 75°3′41.86″W
- Capacity: Open seating without capacity limitation
- FIA Grade: 3
- Broke ground: 2007
- Opened: 31 August 2008; 18 years ago
- Major events: Current: MotoAmerica (2009–present); FR Americas (2018, 2022–present); SCCA (2008–present); Former: Atlantic Championship Series (2008–2009, 2012, 2015–2018, 2024–2025); Trans-Am Series (2010, 2012, 2014–2017); NASCAR K&N Pro Series East; JustDrive.com 125 (2016–2018); ARCA Racing Series; NJMP ARCA 150 (2008–2016); Rolex Sports Car Series (2008–2012); Pirelli World Challenge (2008–2009, 2014); Indy Pro 2000 Championship (2008–2010, 2020–2021)

Thunderbolt Raceway (2008–present)
- Surface: Asphalt
- Length: 2.250 mi (3.621 km)
- Turns: 13
- Race lap record: 1:10.469 ( (United States) David Grant, Swift 016.a, 2024, Formula Atlantic)

Lightning Raceway (2008–present)
- Surface: Asphalt
- Length: 1.900 mi (3.058 km)
- Turns: 10

New Jersey Motorsports Park is a road course "Motorsports Entertainment Complex" located in Millville, Cumberland County, New Jersey, United States. It has hosted races since opening in 2008 and currently hosts a schedule including MotoAmerica Pro Road Racing, 24 Hours of LeMons, American Historic Racing Motorcycle Association, SCCA events, SCCA Pro Racing's F2000 Championship Series.

== Current tracks and facilities ==
=== Thunderbolt and Lightning Raceways ===
New Jersey Motorsports Park is located on 500 acres (200 ha) immediately adjacent to the Millville Executive Airport, a location that was dedicated in 1941 as the Millville Army Air Field, which played a key role in the country's World War II military efforts.

NJMP is one of the few facilities in the world housing two circuits that can be operated simultaneously. The tracks both feature many elevation changes, along with lengthy front straightaways. One of the best known features of this course is a stretch on Thunderbolt Raceway known as "the Jersey devil."

The Park offers open seating which allows spectators to venture throughout the grounds. Grandstands are available in several locations, in addition to camping areas and on-site hotel and condominium accommodations. The facility includes a full-service bar and restaurant, The Finish Line Pub, located at the center of the property.

=== Go-karting ===
In addition to the two road courses, NJMP includes a 1.1 mi (1.8 km) karting facility called Tempest Raceway. Like the park itself, Tempest consists of two tracks that can be operated simultaneously. It hosts daily arrive-and-drive programs, and offers custom experiences for groups. The complex also hosts competition events sanctioned by various regional and national series.

In 2011 NJMP filed Chapter 11 bankruptcy, defaulting on its contracts with the City of Millville. It remained open following bankruptcy reorganization.

== Lap records ==
As of September 2026, the fastest official race lap records at the New Jersey Motorsports Park are listed as:

Category	Time	Driver	Vehicle	Event
Thunderbolt Circuit (2008–present): 2.250 mi (3.621 km)
Formula Atlantic	1:10.469	David Grant	Swift 016.a	2024 New Jersey Atlantic Championship round
Daytona Prototype	1:12.440	Max Angelelli	Dallara DP01	2008 Supercar Life 250
Indy Pro 2000	1:12.8344	Colin Kaminsky	Tatuus PM-18	2020 Cooper Tires Indy Pro 2000 Grand Prix at New Jersey Motorsports Park
Formula Regional	1:13.786	Kyle Kirkwood	Ligier JS F3	2018 New Jersey F3 Americas round
US F2000	1:17.7495	Nolan Siegel	Tatuus USF-17	2020 The Andersen Companies USF2000 Grand Prix at New Jersey Motorsports Park
Formula Lites	1:17.837	Vinicius Papareli	Crawford FL15	2015 New Jersey Formula Lites round
Formula 4	1:18.864	Nicolas Stati	Ligier JS F422	2024 New Jersey F4 United States round
TA1	1:19.073	Ernie Francis Jr.	Ford Mustang Trans-Am	2017 New Jersey Trans-Am round
Porsche Carrera Cup	1:19.718	Andy Lally	Porsche 911 (997) GT3 Cup	2008 Supercar Life 250
Formula BMW	1:19.767	Alexander Rossi	Mygale FB02	2008 New Jersey Formula BMW Americas round
Superbike	1:20.076	Jake Gagne	Yamaha YZF-R1	2021 New Jersey MotoAmerica Superbike round
TA2	1:20.508	Gar Robinson	Chevrolet Camaro Trans-Am	2017 New Jersey Trans-Am round
Supersport	1:21.554	Mathew Scholtz	Yamaha YZF-R9	2025 New Jersey MotoAmerica Supersport round
Twins Cup	1:24.940	Matthew Chapin	Suzuki GSX-8R	2025 New Jersey MotoAmerica Twins Cup round
Supersport 300	1:29.264	Rocco Landers	Kawasaki Ninja 400R	2020 New Jersey MotoAmerica Junior Cup round
Pirelli World Challenge TC	1:29.748	Michael DiMeo	Honda Civic Si	2014 New Jersey Pirelli World Challenge round
Mazda MX-5 Cup	1:31.7819	Gresham Wagner	Mazda MX-5 (ND)	2020 New Jersey Mazda MX-5 Cup round
Pirelli World Challenge TCB	1:40.289	Brian Price	Honda Fit	2014 New Jersey Pirelli World Challenge round
Thunderbolt Circuit with Turn 2 Chicane (2008–present): 2.250 mi (3.621 km)
Formula Regional	1:15.457	Cooper Shipman	Ligier JS F3	2026 New Jersey FR Americas round
Formula 4	1:19.582	Gastón Irazú	Ligier JS F422	2026 New Jersey F4 United States round
Thunderbolt Circuit with Turn 3 Chicane (2008–present): 2.250 mi (3.621 km)
Superbike	1:30.888	Bobby Fong	Yamaha YZF-R1	2026 New Jersey MotoAmerica Superbike round
Twins Cup	1:34.245	Nathan Gouker	Suzuki GSX-8R	2026 New Jersey MotoAmerica Twins Cup round
Supersport	1:34.866	Darryn Binder	Ducati Panigale V2	2026 New Jersey MotoAmerica Supersport round

== History of racing at the park ==
=== Events ===
NBC's Octane Academy held its east coast qualifier at the Park's 1.900 mi (3.058 km) Lightning Raceway in January 2013.

=== Records ===
New Jersey Motorsports Park's slowest hot lap was done in a Ferrari 458 Italia driven by automotive journalist Danny Korecki on the Lightning Circuit. Korecki drove the Ferrari 458 on three consecutive laps while going no faster than 25 miles per hour.

=== Pro racing ===
Many renowned racing series have visited New Jersey Motorsports Park. The first was Grand-Am Road Racing's Rolex Sports Car Series in 2008, with Oswaldo Negri and Mark Patterson capturing the first-ever Thunderbolt trophies. The ARCA Racing Series and AMA Superbike Championship also joined the NJMP schedule, holding annual points-paying races at the Northeast facility. In 2010, SCCA Pro Racing's Trans-Am Series held its first race at Thunderbolt Raceway and returned in 2012, and from 2014 on.

Other notable events include the "Devil in the Dark", a 12-hour endurance race put on by the South Jersey region of the SCCA. Regional and national sportscar and motorcycle clubs also hold hundreds of track-day events at the two circuits each season.

=== Event list ===
Current

- May: Sports Car Club of America
- June: Sports Car Club of America, National Auto Sport Association, 24 Hours of Lemons
- July: New Jersey Motorsports Park Vintage Festival
- August: Formula Regional Americas Championship NJMP SpeedTour, Formula 4 United States Championship, Sportscar Vintage Racing Association, Sports Car Club of America, National Auto Sport Association
- September: MotoAmerica MotoAmerica Superbikes at New Jersey
- October: Sports Car Club of America
- November: National Auto Sport Association

Former

- AMA Superbike Championship (2009–2014)
- ARCA Racing Series
  - NJMP ARCA 150 (2008–2016)
- Atlantic Championship Series (2008–2009, 2012, 2015–2018, 2024–2025)
- ChampCar Endurance Series (2012, 2014–2015)
- Continental Tire Sports Car Challenge (2008–2012)
- Ferrari Challenge North America (2008, 2010)
- Formula BMW Americas (2008)
- Formula Lites (2015)
- IMSA GT3 Cup Challenge (2010)
- IMSA Prototype Lites (2009–2010)
- Indy Pro 2000 Championship (2008–2010, 2020–2021)
- Mazda MX-5 Cup (2008–2010, 2020)
- NASCAR K&N Pro Series East
  - JustDrive.com 125 (2016–2018)
- Pirelli World Challenge (2008–2009, 2014)
- Rolex Sports Car Series (2008–2012)
- Trans-Am Series (2010, 2012, 2014–2017)
- USF2000 Championship (2010, 2020–2021)

=== Race history ===
==== American Superbike ====
Year	Date	Driver	Team	Manufacturer	Race Distance	
Year	Date	Driver	Team	Manufacturer	Laps	Best Lap
2009	September 5	(United States) Josh Hayes	Yamaha Motor Corp.	Yamaha	23	1:21.979
2009	September 6	(United States) Josh Hayes	Yamaha Motor Corp.	Yamaha	23	1:21.287
2010	September 4	(United States) Josh Hayes	Team Graves Yamaha	Yamaha	21	1:21.210
2010	September 5	(United States) Josh Hayes	Team Graves Yamaha	Yamaha	23	1:21.242
2011	September 3	(United States) Josh Hayes	Monster Energy Graves Yamaha	Yamaha	23	1:21.264
2011	September 4	(United States) Blake Young	Rockstar/Makita/Suzuki	Suzuki	23	1:21.904
2012	September 8	(United States) Josh Hayes	Monster Energy Graves Yamaha	Yamaha	23	1:20.737
2012	September 9	(United States) Josh Hayes	Monster Energy Graves Yamaha	Yamaha	23	1:20.895
2013	September 14	(United States) Josh Herrin	Monster Energy Graves Yamaha	Yamaha	20	1.21.804
2013	September 15	(United States) Josh Hayes	Monster Energy Graves Yamaha	Yamaha	23	1:20.716
2014	September 13	(United States) Roger Lee Hayden	Yoshimura Suzuki Factory Racing	Suzuki	23	1:41.407
2014	September 14	(United States) Josh Hayes	Monster Energy Graves Yamaha	Yamaha	23	1:21.437

==== MotoAmerica Superbike Series ====
Year	Date	Race #	Driver	Team	Manufacturer	Race Distance	
Year	Date	Race #	Driver	Team	Manufacturer	Laps	Best Lap
2015	September 12	Race 1	(United States) Josh Hayes	Monster Energy/Graves/Yamaha	Yamaha	9	1:22.496
2015	September 13	Race 2	(United States) Josh Hayes	Monster Energy/Graves/Yamaha	Yamaha	25	1:22.148
2016	September 11	Race 1	(United States) Roger Lee Hayden	Yoshimura Suzuki Factory Racing	Suzuki	25	1:21.289
2016	September 12	Race 2	(Spain) Toni Elias	Yoshimura Suzuki Factory Racing	Suzuki	25	1:21.521
2017	September 9	Race 1	(Spain) Toni Elias	Yoshimura Suzuki Factory Racing	Suzuki	23	1:21.092
2017	September 10	Race 2	(Spain) Toni Elias	Yoshimura Suzuki Factory Racing	Suzuki	25	1:21.044
2018	September 8	Race 1	(United States) Josh Herrin	Attack Performance/Herrin Compound/Yamaha	Yamaha	23	1:37.936
2018	September 9	Race 2	(United States) Cameron Beaubier	Monster Energy/Yamalube/Yamaha Factory Racing	Yamaha	18	1:43.626
2019	September 7	Race 1	(United States) Garrett Gerloff	Monster Energy/Yamalube/Yamaha Factory Racing	Yamaha	23	1:20.588
2019	September 8	Race 2	(United States) Cameron Beaubier	Monster Energy/Yamalube/Yamaha Factory Racing	Yamaha	23	1:20.902
2020	September 12	Race 1	(United States) Cameron Beaubier	Monster Energy Attack Performance Yamaha	Yamaha	21	1:20.310
2020	September 13	Race 2	(United States) Cameron Beaubier	Monster Energy Attack Performance Yamaha	Yamaha	14	1:20.937
2021	September 11	Race 1	(United States) Jake Gagne	Fresh N' Lean Attack Performance Yamaha	Yamaha	20	1:20.747
2021	September 12	Race 2	(United States) Jake Gagne	Fresh N' Lean Attack Performance Yamaha	Yamaha	20	1:20.076
2022	September 10	Race 1	(United States) Jake Gagne	Fresh N' Lean Attack Performance Yamaha	Yamaha	17	1:20.796
2022	September 11	Race 2	(Italy) Danilo Petrucci	Warhorse HSBK Racing Ducati NYC	Ducati	14	1:31.698
2023	September 23	Race 1	(United States) Jake Gagne	Fresh N' Lean Attack Performance Yamaha	Yamaha	20	1:36.714
2023	September 24	Race 2	(United States) J. D. Beach	Fresh N' Lean Attack Performance Yamaha	Yamaha	16	1:34.267
2024	September 28	Race 1	(United States) Josh Herrin	Warhorse HSBK Racing Ducati NYC	Ducati	20	1:21.602
2024	September 29	Race 2	(France) Loris Baz	Warhorse HSBK Racing Ducati NYC	Ducati	20	1:20.854
2025	September 27	Race 1	(United States) Bobby Fong	Attack Performance Progressive Yamaha Racing	Yamaha	20	1:20.321
2025	September 28	Race 2	(United States) Josh Herrin	Warhorse HSBK Racing Ducati	Ducati	20	1:20.755
2025	September 28	Race 3	(United States) Cameron Beaubier	Tytlers Cycle Racing	BMW	20	1:20.612

==== NASCAR K&N Pro Series East ====
Year	Date	Driver	Team	Manufacturer	Race Distance
Year	Date	Driver	Team	Manufacturer	Laps
2016	September 17	(United States) Noah Gragson	Jefferson Pitts Racing	Ford	55
2017	September 16	(United States) Will Rodgers	Jefferson Pitts Racing	Ford	55
2018	June 16	(United States) Will Rodgers	Jefferson Pitts Racing	Ford	55

==== ARCA Racing Series ====
Year	Date	Driver	Team	Manufacturer	Race Distance
Year	Date	Driver	Team	Manufacturer	Laps
2008	September 28	(United States) Justin Allgaier	Allgaier Motorsports	Chevrolet	48
2009	September 13	(United States) Patrick Long	Cunningham Motorsports	Dodge	67
2010	August 15	(United States) Casey Roderick	Bill Elliott Racing	Dodge	67
2011	May 22	(Canada) Andrew Ranger	NDS Motorsports	Dodge	67
2012	July 1	(Canada) Andrew Ranger	NDS Motorsports	Dodge	67
2013	July 28	(Canada) Andrew Ranger	NDS Motorsports	Dodge	67
2014	June 1	(Canada) Andrew Ranger	NDS Motorsports	Dodge	67
2015	May 24	(United States) Kyle Weatherman	Cunningham Motorsports	Dodge	67
2016	May 28	(United States) Parker Kligerman	Cunningham Motorsports	Dodge	67

==== Rolex Sports Car Series ====
Year	Date	Drivers	Team	Manufacturer	Race Distance
Year	Date	Drivers	Team	Manufacturer	Laps
2008	August 31	(Brazil) Oswaldo Negri (South Africa) Mark Patterson	Michael Shank Racing #60	Riley Technologies-Ford	105
2009	May 3	(Sweden) Niclas Jönsson (Brazil) Ricardo Zonta	Krohn Racing #76	Proto-Auto-Lola-Ford	87
2010	August 18	(United States) Jon Fogarty (United States) Alex Gurney	Bob Stallings Racing #99	Riley Technologies-Chevrolet	116
2011	July 24	(United States) Scott Pruett (Mexico) Memo Rojas	Chip Ganassi Racing #01	Riley Technologies-BMW	117
2012	May 13	(Italy) Max Angelelli (United States) Ricky Taylor	Wayne Taylor Racing #10	Corvette DP	117

==== Trans Am Series ====
Year	Date	Class	Driver	Team / Sponsor	Manufacturer	Race Distance / Time Limit
2010	May 9	TA	(United States) Tomy Drissi	Rocketsports Racing	Jaguar	101.25 miles / 45 laps / 75 minutes
2012	July 1	TA	(United States) Amy Ruman	Ruman Racing McNichols Company	Chevrolet	101.25 miles / 45 laps / 75 minutes
2012	July 1	TA2	(United States) Pete Halsmer	CTEK Battery Chargers Motorstate / Allstar	Chevrolet	101.25 miles / 45 laps / 75 minutes
2014	June 1	TA	(United States) Amy Ruman	Ruman Racing McNichols Company	Chevrolet	101.25 miles / 45 laps / 90 minutes
2014	June 1	TA2	(United States) Cameron Lawrence	Miller Racing CTEK Battery Chargers / Northstar	Chevrolet	101.25 miles / 45 laps / 90 minutes
2014	June 1	TA3 – International	(United States) Jason Berkeley	BMG Management	Chevrolet	101.25 miles / 45 laps / 90 minutes
2014	June 1	TA3 – American	(United States) Ernie Francis Jr.	Breathless Performance Racing	Chevrolet	101.25 miles / 45 laps / 90 minutes
2015	June 14	TA	(United States) Amy Ruman	Ruman Racing McNichols Company	Chevrolet	101.25 miles / 45 laps / 75 minutes
2015	June 14	TA2	(United States) Adam Andretti	Engineered Components Company (ECC)	Ford	101.25 miles / 45 laps / 75 minutes
2015	June 14	TA3 – International	(United States) Andrew Aquilante	Phoenix Performance / Hawk	Chevrolet	101.25 miles / 45 laps / 75 minutes
2015	June 14	TA3 – American	(United States) Ernie Francis Jr.	Breathless Performance Racing	Chevrolet	101.25 miles / 45 laps / 75 minutes
2016	June 12	TA	(United States) Paul Fix	Stop Flex / The Car Coach / Classic Tube	Chevrolet	101.25 miles / 45 laps / 75 minutes
2016	June 12	TA2	(United States) Tony Buffomante	Mike Cope Racing	Ford	101.25 miles / 45 laps / 75 minutes
2016	June 12	TA3	(United States) Andrew Aquilante	Phoenix Performance / Hawk / Penske	Chevrolet	101.25 miles / 45 laps / 75 minutes
2016	June 12	TA4	(United States) Ernie Francis Jr.	Breathless Performance Racing Beta Tools / Liquid Performance	Ford	101.25 miles / 45 laps / 75 minutes
2016	June 12	TA5	(United States) Tim Kezman	Fall-Line Motorsports / Calypso	Porsche	101.25 miles / 45 laps / 75 minutes
2017	October 8	TA	(United States) Ernie Francis Jr.	Breathless Performance Racing Beta Tools / Liquid Performance	Ford	101.25 miles / 45 laps / 75 minutes
2017	October 8	TA2	(United States) Gar Robinson	Robinson Racing Pura Vida Tequila / 74 Ranch Resort	Chevrolet	101.25 miles / 45 laps / 75 minutes
2017	October 8	TA3	(United States) Neal Walker	Tullman Walker Racing	Porsche	101.25 miles / 45 laps / 75 minutes
2017	October 8	TA4	(United States) Brian Kleeman	DWW Motorsports	Ford	101.25 miles / 45 laps / 75 minutes
