= 2020 MotoAmerica Superbike Championship =

The 2020 MotoAmerica Superbike Championship season was the 44th season of the premier class of circuit-based motorcycle racing in the United States and the 6th since its renaming to MotoAmerica. Cameron Beaubier entered the season as the defending champion, after taking his fourth title in 2019.

== Calendar and results ==
Round	Circuit	Date	Race 1 Winner	Race 2 Winner	Race 3 Winner
1	(Wisconsin) Road America	May 29–31	(United States) Cameron Beaubier	(United States) Cameron Beaubier	
2	(Wisconsin) Road America	June 26–28	(United States) Cameron Beaubier	(United States) Bobby Fong	
3	(Georgia (U.S. state)) Road Atlanta	July 31-August 2	(United States) Cameron Beaubier	(United States) Cameron Beaubier	
4	(Pennsylvania) Pittsburgh	August 7–9	(United States) Cameron Beaubier	(United States) Cameron Beaubier	
5	(Washington (state)) The Ridge	August 28–30	(United States) Cameron Beaubier	(United States) Cameron Beaubier	
6	New Jersey	September 11–13	(United States) Cameron Beaubier	(United States) Cameron Beaubier	
7	Alabama	September 18–20	(United States) Cameron Beaubier	(United States) Cameron Beaubier	
8	(Indiana) Indianapolis	October 9–11	(United States) Bobby Fong	(Italy) Lorenzo Zanetti	(United States) Bobby Fong
9	(California) Monterey	October 23–25	(United States) Cameron Beaubier	(United States) Cameron Beaubier	(United States) Cameron Beaubier

== Teams and riders ==
2020 Entry List
Team	Constructor	No.	Rider	Rounds
Monster Energy Attack Performance Yamaha	Yamaha	1	(United States) Cameron Beaubier	All
Monster Energy Attack Performance Yamaha	Yamaha	32	(United States) Jake Gagne	All
Scheibe Racing	BMW	2	(United States) Josh Herrin	All
Scheibe Racing	BMW	85	(United States) Jake Lewis	1
Travis Wyman Racing	BMW	10	(United States) Travis Wyman	All
Westby Racing	Yamaha	11	(South Africa) Mathew Scholtz	1–8
Westby Racing	Yamaha	59	(Italy) Niccolo Canepa	9
AP Racing 62/Mustang CAT Rental Store	Kawasaki	12	(United States) Alan Phillips	7
FLY Racing ADR Motorsports	Suzuki	14	(United States) Andrew Lee	7
FLY Racing ADR Motorsports	Suzuki	25	(Australia) David Anthony	All
FLY Racing ADR Motorsports	Suzuki	55	(United States) Michael Gilbert	8–9
FLY Racing ADR Motorsports	Yamaha	17	(United States) Sam Verderico	1–2, 4–6, 8–9
FLY Racing ADR Motorsports	Kawasaki	57	(United Kingdom) Bradley Ward	1–6
Superbike Unlimited Franklin Armory Racing	Kawasaki	14	(United States) Andrew Lee	8
M4 ECSTAR Suzuki	Suzuki	16	(Canada) Alex Dumas	4–5, 8–9
M4 ECSTAR Suzuki	Suzuki	24	(Spain) Toni Elias	All
M4 ECSTAR Suzuki	Suzuki	50	(United States) Bobby Fong	All
Hunter Dunham Racing	Yamaha	19	(United States) Hunter Dunham	4–5, 7
Yates Racing	Honda	22	(United States) Ashton Yates	1–4, 6–8
Ride HVMC Racing	Kawasaki	23	(United States) Corey Alexander	All
Legacy Dental	Yamaha	31	(United States) Jeffrey Purk	3–4, 7–8
KWR Ducati Team	Ducati	33	(United States) Kyle Wyman	All
Rock and Sons Racing	Honda	36	(United States) Jayson Uribe	5, 9
MESA37 Racing	Kawasaki	37	(United States) Stefano Mesa	3–4, 7
Superbike Underground	BMW	42	(United States) Jeremy Coffey	All
Altus Motorsports	Suzuki	45	(South Africa) Cameron Petersen	All
Limitless Racing	Kawasaki	48	(United States) Joseph Giannotto	1–3, 6–8
Zlock Racing	Kawasaki	49	(United States) Brian Pinkstaff	5
Zlock Racing	Kawasaki	91	(United States) Kevin Pinkstaff	5
Disrupt Racing	Kawasaki	54	(United States) Geoff May	3
Disrupt Racing	Kawasaki	79	(United States) Tony Storniolo	2
Michael Gilbert Racing	Kawasaki	55	(United States) Michael Gilbert	2, 4–7
EDR Performance/DiBrino Racing	Kawasaki	62	(United States) Andy DiBrino	5, 9
Suzuki Canada	Suzuki	66	(Canada) Trevor Daley	8
MonkeyMoto AGVSport	Yamaha	72	(United Kingdom) Steven Shakespeare	6
Montego Racing	Suzuki	73	(Brazil) Sebastiao Ferreira	9
Celtic HSBK Racing	Ducati	85	(United States) Jake Lewis	4
Celtic HSBK Racing	Ducati	99	(United States) PJ Jacobsen	1–2
Warhorse HSBK Racing Ducati New York	Ducati	87	(Italy) Lorenzo Zanetti	5, 8–9
Thrashed Bike Racing LLC	Yamaha	88	(United Kingdom) Max Flinders	All
Procomps Racing Team	BMW	94	(Brazil) Danilo Lewis	1–3, 5–9
Tango Racing	Kawasaki	141	(Uruguay) Maximiliano Gerardo	8
Walt Sipp Racing	Yamaha	221	(United States) Walt Sipp	7

== Championship standings ==
=== Riders' championship ===
Scoring system

Points are awarded to the top fifteen finishers. A rider has to finish the race to earn points.

Position	1st	2nd	3rd	4th	5th	6th	7th	8th	9th	10th	11th	12th	13th	14th	15th
Points	25	20	16	13	11	10	9	8	7	6	5	4	3	2	1

Pos	Rider	Bike	RAM (Wisconsin)		RAM (Wisconsin)		RAT (Georgia (U.S. state))		PIT (Pennsylvania)		RID (Washington (state))		NJE (New Jersey)		ALA (Alabama)		BRI (Indiana)			MON (California)			Pts
1	(United States) Cameron Beaubier	Yamaha	1	1	1	Ret	1	1	1	1	1	1	1	1	1	1	Ret	3	2	1	1	1	436
2	(United States) Jake Gagne	Yamaha	3	2	6	2	2	2	3	3	4	2	Ret	2	2	5	2	4	7	4	4	5	301
3	(United States) Bobby Fong	Suzuki	4	Ret	2	1	5	4	Ret	Ret	3	3	5	4	6	3	1	2	1	Ret	10	4	253
4	(Spain) Toni Elias	Suzuki	Ret	Ret	4	7	4	5	5	5	5	6	3	5	4	4	4	5	DNS	2	3	2	222
5	(South Africa) Mathew Scholtz	Yamaha	2	Ret	5	4	3	3	2	2	2	4	2	3	3	2	DNS	DNS	DNS				221
6	(United States) Josh Herrin	BMW	6	3	7	5	Ret	7	7	4	6	5	10	Ret	8	6	5	6	4	7	8	13	176
7	(United States) Kyle Wyman	Ducati	5	4	3	3	Ret	6	4	6	DNS	DNS	4	6	7	10	DNS	9	5	5	7	7	174
8	(South Africa) Cameron Petersen	Suzuki	15	7	10	8	16	9	13	8	9	7	7	7	5	Ret	DNS	7	6	8	5	8	133
9	(Italy) Lorenzo Zanetti	Ducati									7	Ret					3	1	3	3	2	3	118
10	(Australia) David Anthony	Suzuki	8	6	8	6	6	8	6	7	Ret	Ret	8	9	DNS	8	DNS	11	9	Ret	DNS	Ret	108
11	(United States) Travis Wyman	BMW	10	15	12	13	11	12	10	10	DNS	10	11	10	10	9	6	8	8	Ret	12	16	95
12	(United States) Corey Alexander	Kawasaki	12	8	Ret	9	DNS	10	DNS	12	Ret	DNS	6	8	DNS	7	10	12	11	10	13	10	86
13	(United Kingdom) Max Flinders	Yamaha	11	9	11	10	9	13	12	DNS	Ret	12	14	13	14	14	11	17	14	14	16	11	64
14	(Brazil) Danilo Lewis	BMW	13	11	15	14	10	DNS			14	Ret	12	12	15	16	9	10	Ret	13	11	12	53
15	(United Kingdom) Bradley Ward	Kawasaki	14	10	14	12	8	Ret	9	Ret	10	9	9	DNS									49
16	(United States) Michael Gilbert	Kawasaki			Ret	11			DNS	DNS	12	DNS	DNS	DNS	DNS	DNS							46
16	(United States) Michael Gilbert	Suzuki															7	13	10	11	9	9	46
17	(United States) Jeremy Coffey	BMW	16	13	DNS	15	14	15	14	DNS	13	11	13	11	13	Ret	15	15	15	16	Ret	DNS	31
18	(Italy) Niccolò Canepa	Yamaha																		6	6	6	30
19	(United States) PJ Jacobsen	Ducati	7	5	9	DNS																	27
20	(Canada) Alex Dumas	Suzuki							DNS	9	DNS	DNS					8	Ret	13	12	14	14	26
21	(United States) Jayson Uribe	Honda									8	8								9	DNS	Ret	23
22	(United States) Jake Lewis	BMW	9	Ret																			20
22	(United States) Jake Lewis	Ducati							8	11													20
23	(United States) Joseph Giannotto	Kawasaki	17	12	Ret	DNS	13	14					15	Ret	12	15	12	19	17				19
24	(United States) Ashton Yates	Honda	DNS	14	Ret	16	12	Ret	DNS	DNS			DNS	DNS	11	12	13	18	DNS				18
25	(United States) Stefano Mesa	Kawasaki					DNS	11	11	DNS					DNS	13							13
26	(United States) Sam Verderico	Yamaha	18	16	13	Ret			15	Ret	17	13	16	14			14	21	18	17	17	15	12
27	(United States) Andrew Lee	Suzuki													9	11							12
27	(United States) Andrew Lee	Kawasaki															Ret	Ret	16				12
28	(United States) Geoff May	Kawasaki					7	DNS															9
29	(United States) Andy DiBrino	Kawasaki									11	DNS								15	15	DNS	7
30	(Uruguay) Maximiliano Gerardo	Kawasaki															DNS	14	12				6
31	(United States) Hunter Dunham	Yamaha							DNS	13	15	DNS			Ret	DNS							4
32	(United States) Jeffrey Purk	Yamaha					15	16	16	14					17	17	DNS	20	19				3
33	(United States) Brian Pinkstaff	Kawasaki									18	14											2
34	(United Kingdom) Steven Shakespeare	Yamaha											17	15									1
	(United States) Alan Phillips	Kawasaki													16	18							0
	(Canada) Trevor Daley	Suzuki															DNS	16	Ret				0
	(United States) Kevin Pinkstaff	Kawasaki									16	Ret											0
	(United States) Tony Storniolo	Kawasaki			DNS	17																	0
	(United States) Walt Sipp	Yamaha													DNS	19							0
	(Brazil) Sebastiao Ferreira	Suzuki																		DNS	DNS	DNS	0
Pos	Rider	Bike	RAM (Wisconsin)		RAM (Wisconsin)		RAT (Georgia (U.S. state))		PIT (Pennsylvania)		RID (Washington (state))		NJE (New Jersey)		ALA (Alabama)		BRI (Indiana)			MON (California)			Pts

=== Superbike Cup ===
Pos	Rider	Bike	RAM (Wisconsin)		RAM (Wisconsin)		RAT (Georgia (U.S. state))		PIT (Pennsylvania)		RID (Washington (state))		NJE (New Jersey)		ALA (Alabama)		BRI (Indiana)			MON (California)			Pts
1	(South Africa) Cameron Petersen	Suzuki	5	2	2	1	7	1	3	1	1	1	2	1	1	Ret	DNS	1	1	1	1	1	396
2	(United States) Travis Wyman	BMW	2	7	3	4	3	4	1	3	DNS	2	3	3	2	2	1	2	2	Ret	3	5	312
3	(United States) Corey Alexander	Kawasaki	3	3	Ret	2	DNS	2	DNS	4	Ret	DNS	1	2	DNS	1	4	4	3	2	4	2	250
4	(Brazil) Danilo Lewis	BMW	4	4	4	5	2	DNS			4	Ret	4	4	5	6	3	3	Ret	4	2	3	211
5	(United States) Joseph Giannotto	Kawasaki	6	5	Ret	DNS	5	5					5	Ret	4	5	5	7	6				108
6	(Canada) Alex Dumas	Suzuki							DNS	2	DNS	DNS					2	Ret	5	3	5	4	91
7	(United States) Ashton Yates	Kawasaki	DNS	6	Ret	6	4	Ret	DNS	DNS			DNS	DNS	3	3	6	6	DNS				85
8	(United States) Jeffrey Purk	Yamaha					6	6	4	6					7	7	DNS	8	7				78
9	(United States) PJ Jacobsen	Ducati	1	1	1	DNS																	75
10	(United States) Stefano Mesa	Kawasaki					DNS	3	2	DNS					DNS	4							49
11	(United States) Andy DiBrino	Kawasaki									2	DNS								5	6	DNS	41
12	(United States) Michael Gilbert	Kawasaki			Ret	3			DNS	DNS	3	DNS	DNS	DNS	DNS	DNS							32
13	(United States) Geoff May	Kawasaki					1	DNS															25
14	(Uruguay) Maximiliano Gerardo	Kawasaki															DNS	5	4				24
15	(United States) Hunter Dunham	Yamaha							DNS	5	5	DNS			Ret	DNS							22
16	(United Kingdom) Steven Shakespeare	Yamaha											6	5									21
17	(United States) Alan Phillips	Kawasaki													6	8							18
18	(United States) Tony Storniolo	Kawasaki			DNS	7																	9
19	(United States) Walt Sipp	Yamaha													DNS	9							7
20	(Brazil) Sebastiao Ferreira	Suzuki																		DNS	DNS	DNS	0
Pos	Rider	Bike	RAM (Wisconsin)		RAM (Wisconsin)		RAT (Georgia (U.S. state))		PIT (Pennsylvania)		RID (Washington (state))		NJE (New Jersey)		ALA (Alabama)		BRI (Indiana)			MON (California)			Pts
