= Sports Car Challenge at Mid-Ohio =

IMSA WeatherTech SportsCar Championship
- Venue: Mid-Ohio Sports Car Course
- Corporate sponsor: Acura
- First race: 1963
- First IMSA race: 2018
- Last race: 2022
- Duration: 2 hours 40 minutes
- Previous names: Mid-Ohio 6 Hours; Grand Prix of Ohio
- Most wins (driver): Al Holbert (6)
- Most wins (team): Holbert Racing (7)
- Most wins (manufacturer): Porsche (16)

The Sports Car Challenge at Mid-Ohio is a sports car race held annually at the Mid-Ohio Sports Car Course. The race began in 1963 as a part of the United States Road Racing Championship. It was part of the IMSA GT Championship from 1972 until 1993, and the American Le Mans Series from 2001 to 2002 and again from 2004 to 2012. From 2007 until 2012 the race took place on the same weekend as the IndyCar Series' Honda 200 and the event was sponsored by Acura from 2007 until 2009 and again in 2018. It was announced in July 2017 that the race would return on May 4-6 2018 as part of the IMSA WeatherTech SportsCar Championship.

== Results ==
Year	Drivers	Team	Car	Duration/Distance	Race title	Report
United States Road Racing Championship
1963	(United States) Ken Miles	(United States) Temple Buell	Shelby Cobra	168 miles (270 km)	USRRC Mid-Ohio	report
1964	(United States) Hap Sharp	(United States) Chaparral Cars	Chaparral 2A-Chevrolet	168 miles (270 km)	USRRC Mid-Ohio	report
1965	(United States) Hap Sharp	(United States) Chaparral Cars	Chaparral 2A-Chevrolet	200 miles (320 km)	USRRC Mid-Ohio	report
1966	(United States) Lothar Motschenbacher	(United States) Dan Blocker Racing	McLaren M1B-Oldsmobile	200 miles (320 km)	Buckeye Cup	report
1967	(United States) Mark Donohue	(United States) Roger Penske	Lola T70 Mk3B-Chevrolet	200 miles (320 km)	Lexington 200	report
1968	(United States) Mark Donohue	(United States) Roger Penske	McLaren M6A-Chevrolet	180 miles (290 km)	USRRC Mid-Ohio	report
1969 — 1971	Not held					
IMSA GT Championship
1972	(United States) Bob Beasley (United States) Michael Keyser	(United States) Toad Hall Motor Racing	Porsche 911 S	6 hours	Camel 6 Hour	report
1973	(United States) Bob Beasley (United States) Michael Keyser	(United States) Toad Hall Motor Racing	Porsche 911 Carrera RSR	6 hours	Mid-Ohio 6 Hours	report
1974	(United States) Al Holbert (United States) Peter Gregg	(United States) Holbert's Porsche/Audi	Porsche 911 Carrera RSR	5 Hours	Mid-Ohio Twin 6s	report
1975 (June)	(United States) Al Holbert	(United States) Holbert Racing	Porsche 911 Carrera RSR	100 miles (160 km)	Mid-Ohio 100	report
1975 (August)	(United States) Al Holbert (United States) Elliot Forbes-Robinson	(United States) Holbert Racing	Porsche 911 Carrera RSR	6 Hours	Mid-Ohio 6 Hours	report
1976 (June)	(United States) Michael Keyser		Chevrolet Monza	100 miles (160 km)	Twin's 200	report
1976 (August)	(United States) Jim Busby	(United States) Busby Racing	Porsche Carrera	3 Hours	Mid-Ohio 6 Hours	report
1977 (June)	(United Kingdom) David Hobbs	(United Kingdom) McLaren North America	BMW 320i Turbo	100 miles (160 km)	Twin's 200	report
1977 (August)	(United States) Peter Gregg	(United States) Brumos Porsche	Porsche 935	3 Hours	Mid-Ohio Twin 3 Hours	report
1978	(United States) Bill Whittington (United States) Jim Busby	(United States) Whittington Brothers Racing	Porsche 935/77A	250 miles (400 km)	Camel GT 250	report
1979	(United States) Peter Gregg (United States) Hurley Haywood	(United States) Peter Gregg Racing	Porsche 935/79	250 miles (400 km)	Camel GT 250	report
1980	Not held					
1981	(United Kingdom) Brian Redman	(United States) Kent-Cooke/Wood Racing	Lola T600-Chevrolet	200 miles (320 km)	Red Roof Inns GT 200	report
1982 (May)	(United Kingdom) John Fitzpatrick	(United Kingdom) John Fitzpatrick Racing	Porsche 935 K4	100 miles (160 km)	Red Roof Inns Camel GT Sprints	report
1982 (Sept)	(United Kingdom) John Fitzpatrick (United Kingdom) David Hobbs	(United Kingdom) John Fitzpatrick Racing	Porsche 935 K4	6 hours	Lumbermens 6 Hour Camel GT	report
1983	(United States) Jim Trueman (United States) Doc Bundy (United States) Bobby Rahal	(United States) Holbert Racing	March 83G-Chevrolet	6 hours	Lumbermens 6 Hours	report
1984	(United States) Al Holbert (United Kingdom) Derek Bell	(United States) Holbert Racing	Porsche 962	500 km (310 mi)	Lumbermens 500k	report
1985	(United States) Al Holbert (United Kingdom) Derek Bell	(United States) Holbert Racing	Porsche 962	500 km (310 mi)	Lumbermens 500k	report
1986	(United States) Al Holbert (United Kingdom) Derek Bell	(United States) Holbert Racing	Porsche 962	500 km (310 mi)	IMSA Camel Grand Prix	report
1987	(West Germany) Jochen Mass (United States) Bobby Rahal	(United States) Bayside Disposal Racing	Porsche 962	500 km (310 mi)	Champion Spark Plug Grand Prix	report
1988	(Australia) Geoff Brabham (United States) Tom Gloy	(United States) Electramotive Engineering	Nissan GTP ZX-T	500 km (310 mi)	Nissan Grand Prix of Ohio	report
1989	(Australia) Geoff Brabham (United States) Chip Robinson	(United States) Electramotive Engineering	Nissan GTP ZX-T	500 km (310 mi)	Nissan Grand Prix of Ohio	report
1990	(Australia) Geoff Brabham (Republic of Ireland) Derek Daly	(United States) Nissan Performance	Nissan NPT-90	500 km (310 mi)	Nissan Grand Prix of Ohio	report
1991	(United States) Davy Jones	(United Kingdom) Bud Light/Jaguar Racing	Jaguar XJR-16	300 km (190 mi)	Nissan Grand Prix of Ohio	report
1992	(United States) Davy Jones	(United Kingdom) Bud Light/Jaguar Racing	Jaguar XJR-14	2 hours	Nissan Grand Prix of Ohio	report
1993	(Argentina) Juan Manuel Fangio II	(United States) All American Racers	Eagle Mk III-Toyota	2 hours	Nissan Grand Prix of Ohio	report
1994 – 1997	Not held					
United States Road Racing Championship
1998	(United States) Dorsey Schroeder (United States) Elliott Forbes-Robinson	(United States) Dyson Racing	Riley & Scott Mk III	2 Hours, 30 Minutes	U.S. Road Racing Classic	report
1999	(United Kingdom) James Weaver (United Kingdom) Andy Wallace	(United States) Dyson Racing	Riley & Scott Mk III	2 Hours, 15 Minutes	U.S. Road Racing Classic	report
2000	Not held					
American Le Mans Series
2001	(Australia) David Brabham (Denmark) Jan Magnussen	(United States) Panoz Motor Sports	Panoz LMP-1 Roadster-S	2 Hours, 45 Minutes	Grand Prix of Mid-Ohio	report
2002	(Germany) Frank Biela (Italy) Emanuele Pirro	(Germany) Audi Sport North America	Audi R8	2 Hours, 45 Minutes	American Le Mans at Mid-Ohio	report
2003	Not held					
2004	(Germany) Marco Werner (Finland) JJ Lehto	(United States) ADT Champion Racing	Audi R8	2 Hours, 45 Minutes	American Le Mans at Mid-Ohio	report
2005	(United States) Butch Leitzinger (United Kingdom) James Weaver	(United States) Dyson Racing	Lola EX257-AER	2 Hours, 45 Minutes	American Le Mans at Mid-Ohio	report
2006	(Germany) Timo Bernhard (France) Romain Dumas	(United States) Penske Racing	Porsche RS Spyder	2 Hours, 45 Minutes	American Le Mans at Mid-Ohio	report
2007	(Germany) Timo Bernhard (France) Romain Dumas	(United States) Penske Racing	Porsche RS Spyder Evo	2 Hours, 45 Minutes	Acura Sports Car Challenge of Mid-Ohio	report
2008	(Germany) Marco Werner (Germany) Lucas Luhr	(United States) Audi Sport North America	Audi R10 TDI	2 Hours, 45 Minutes	Acura Sports Car Challenge of Mid-Ohio	report
2009	(Brazil) Gil de Ferran (France) Simon Pagenaud	(United States) de Ferran Motorsports	Acura ARX-02a	2 Hours, 45 Minutes	Acura Sports Car Challenge of Mid-Ohio	report
2010	(United States) Chris Dyson (United Kingdom) Guy Smith	(United States) Dyson Racing Team	Lola B09/86	2 Hours, 45 Minutes	Mid-Ohio Sports Car Challenge	report
2011	(Germany) Lucas Luhr (Germany) Klaus Graf	(United States) Muscle Milk Aston Martin Racing	Lola-Aston Martin B08/62	2 Hours, 45 Minutes	Mid-Ohio Sports Car Challenge	report
2012	(Germany) Klaus Graf (Germany) Lucas Luhr	(United States) Muscle Milk Pickett Racing	HPD ARX-03a	2 Hours, 45 Minutes	Mid-Ohio Sports Car Challenge	report
2013	Not held					
IMSA WeatherTech SportsCar Championship
2014 – 2017	Not held					
2018	(Brazil) Hélio Castroneves (United States) Ricky Taylor	(United States) Acura Team Penske	Acura ARX-05	2 Hours, 40 Minutes	Acura Sports Car Challenge at Mid-Ohio	report
2019	(United States) Dane Cameron (Colombia) Juan Pablo Montoya	(United States) Acura Team Penske	Acura ARX-05	2 Hours, 40 Minutes	Acura Sports Car Challenge at Mid-Ohio	report
2020	(Brazil) Hélio Castroneves (United States) Ricky Taylor	(United States) Acura Team Penske	Acura ARX-05	2 Hours, 40 Minutes	Acura Sports Car Challenge at Mid-Ohio	report
2021	(Portugal) Filipe Albuquerque (United States) Ricky Taylor	(United States) Konica Minolta Acura	Acura ARX-05	2 Hours, 40 Minutes	Acura Sports Car Challenge at Mid-Ohio presented by the TLX Type S	report
2022	(Portugal) Filipe Albuquerque (United States) Ricky Taylor	(United States) Konica Minolta Acura	Acura ARX-05	2 Hours, 40 Minutes	Lexus Grand Prix at Mid-Ohio	report
