= Josh Herrin =

American motorcycle racer (born 1990)

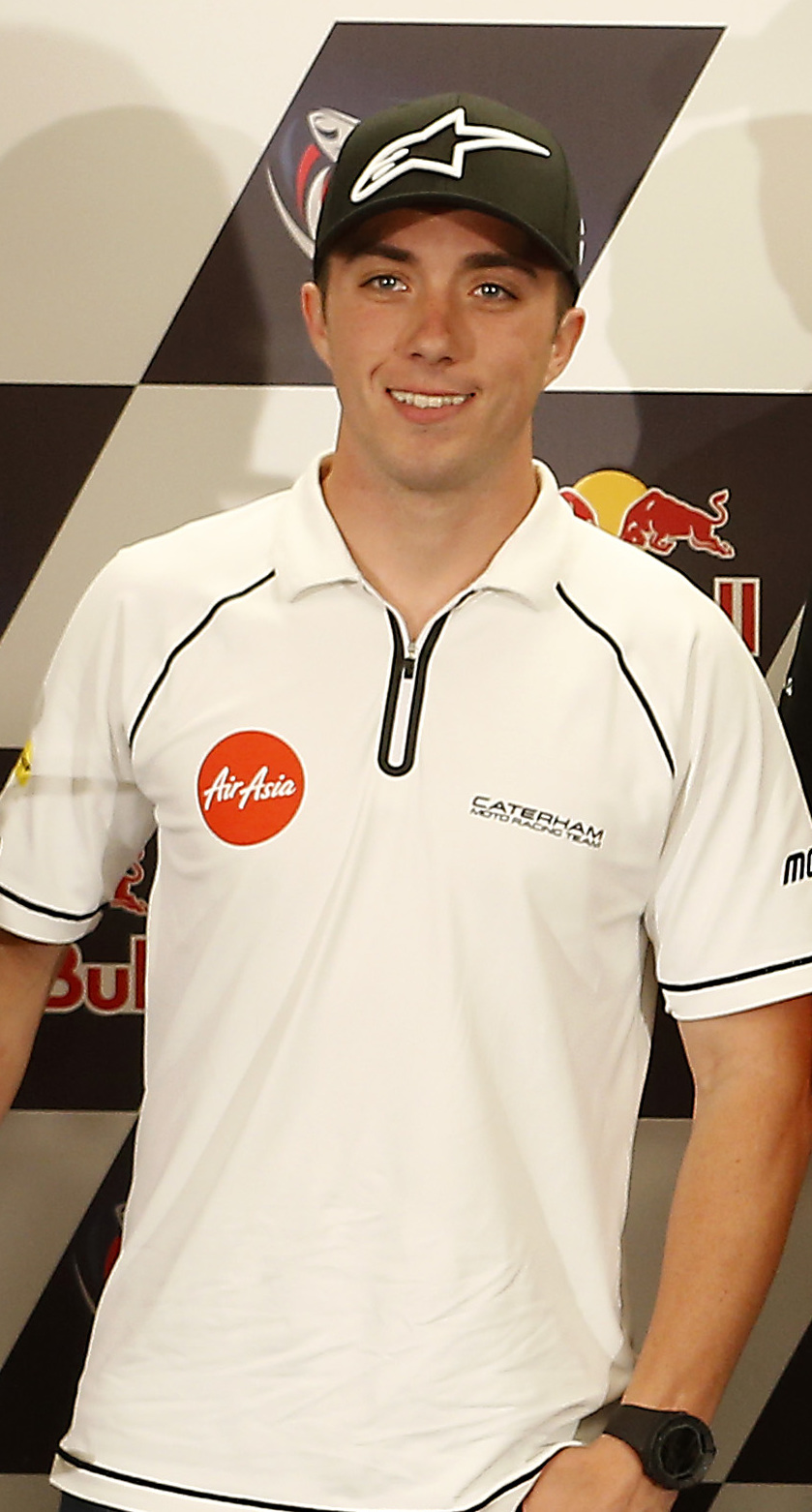
- Herrin in 2014
- Born: May 23, 1990 (age 36); Glendale, California, U.S.
- Current team: Rahal Ducati Moto
- Bike number: 2

Championship titles
- AMA Superbike Championship (2013, 2024); MotoAmerica Supersport Championship (2022)
Statistics
AMA/MotoAmerica Superbike Championship
| Active years | 2012-2013, 2019- |
| Championships | 2 (2013, 2024) |
| Team(s) | Yamaha, Suzuki, BMW, Ducati |
| Last season (2025) | 2nd (7 wins/346 pts) |
Starts / Wins / Podiums / Poles / F. laps / Points; 151 / 21 / 57 / 9 / 11 / 1,542
AMA/MotoAmerica Supersport Championship
| Active years | 2006-2008, 2022 |
| Championships | 1 (2022) |
Moto2 World Championship
| Active years | 2014 |
| Championships | 0 |
| Team(s) | Caterham Suter |
| Last season (2014) | NC (0 pts) |
Starts / Wins / Podiums / Poles / F. laps / Points; 10 / 0 / 0 / 0 / 0 / 0

Joshua James Herrin (born May 23, 1990) is an American motorcycle racer. He currently competes in the MotoAmerica Supersport Championship mentoring younger riders for Rahal Ducati Moto.

== Racing history ==
=== Amateur career ===
Herrin was born in Glendale, California to Phil and Kim Herrin and is the older brother of professional stock car racing driver Zach Herrin. Josh turned professional in 2006 a year after winning a WERA 600 National Championship. Prior to winning the 2004 USGPRU 125 title at the age of 14, he had raced mini bikes and Yamaha YSR50s and was invited to compete in the World Mini GP Festival in Valencia, Spain.

=== Professional career ===
In 2006, Herrin raced a limited AMA Pro SuperSport season, but earned a podium finish at Miller Motorsports Park and took four additional top-ten finishes in the series at a young age of 16. In 2007, he raced in AMA Supersport Championship, achieving a win at the September race at Mazda Raceway Laguna Seca and two additional podium finishes.

2008 saw Herrin finishing fifth in the AMA Pro SuperSport standings with a victory at Barber Motorsports Park, three more podium finishes and a pole at California Speedway. He also led the most laps in the Daytona opener, before finishing second to teammate Ben Bostrom.

In 2009, Herrin finished second in the AMA Pro Daytona Sportbike Championship with four victories (a double at VIR and a double in New Jersey), five second-places and two third-places.

On March 5, 2010, Herrin won the historic Daytona 200. At the age of 19, he became the second youngest rider to win the prestigious race. Brad Andres was 18 years old when he won the race in 1955.

Herrin raced with the Monster Energy Graves Motorsports Yamaha team from 2012 to 2013, winning the AMA Superbike Championship in 2013.

=== Moto2 World Championship ===
In 2013, Herrin announced he would be signing with the Caterham Air Asia team in the 2014 Moto 2 World Championship.

== Career statistics ==
=== All-time statistics ===
| Year | Series | | Poles | Races | Podiums | Wins | 2nd place | 3rd place | Titles |
|---|---|---|---|---|---|---|---|---|---|
| All-time | MotoAmerica Superbike | | | 40 | | 6 | | | |
| All-time | MotoAmerica Superstock 1000 | | | | | 8 | | | 1 |
| All-time | MotoAmerica Supersport | | | | | 13 | | | |
| All-time | AMA Pro Superbike | | | | | 4 | | | 1 |
| All-time | AMA Daytona Sportbike | | 3 | 37 | 22 | 9 | 10 | 3 | |
| All-time | AMA Supersport | | 1 | 28 | 9 | 2 | 3 | 3 | |
| Year | Series | Bike | Poles | Races | Podiums | Wins | 2nd place | 3rd place | Position |
| 2018 | MotoAmerica Superbike | Yamaha YZF-R1 | | | | 2 | | | |
| 2017 | MotoAmerica Superbike | Yamaha YZF-R1 | | | | | | | |
| 2016 | MotoAmerica Superstock 1000 | Yamaha YZF-R1 | | | | 8 | | | 1st |
| 2015 | MotoAmerica Supersport | Yamaha YZF-R6 | | | | 4 | | | |
| 2014 | Moto2 World Championship | Suter MMX2 | | 12 | | | | | |
| 2013 | AMA Superbike | Yamaha YZF-R1 | | 8 | | 4 | | | 1st |
| 2012 | AMA Superbike | Yamaha YZF-R1 | | | | | | | |
| 2011 | AMA Daytona Sportbike | Yamaha YZF-R6 | | | | | | | |
| 2010 | AMA Daytona Sportbike | Yamaha YZF-R6 | 3 | 18 | 11 | 5 | 5 | 1 | 3rd |
| 2009 | AMA Daytona Sportbike | Yamaha YZF-R6 | | 20 | 11 | 4 | 5 | 2 | 2nd |
| 2008 | AMA Supersport | Yamaha YZF-R6 | 1 | 11 | 5 | 1 | 1 | 3 | 5th |
| 2007 | AMA Supersport | Yamaha YZF-R6 | | 10 | 3 | 1 | 2 | | 7th |
| 2006 | AMA Supersport | Yamaha YZF-R6 | | 7 | 1 | | 1 | | 11th |

=== AMA Supersport Championship ===
==== By year ====
| Year | Class | Bike | 1 | 2 | 3 | 4 | 5 | 6 | 7 | 8 | 9 | 10 | 11 | Pos | Pts |
|---|---|---|---|---|---|---|---|---|---|---|---|---|---|---|---|
| 2006 | Supersport | Yamaha | DAY | BAR | FON | INF; C | RAM; 6 | MIL; 7 | LAG; 10 | OHI; 10 | VIR; 23 | RAT; 9 | OHI; Ret | 11th | 121 |
| 2007 | Supersport | Yamaha | DAY; 11 | BAR; 2 | FON; Ret | INF; 5 | RAM; Ret | MIL; 6 | LAG; 2 | OHI | VIR; 21 | RAT; 5 | LAG; 1 | 7th | 209 |

=== MotoAmerica Supersport Championship ===
==== Races by year ====
| Year | Class | Team | 1 | | 2 | | 3 | | 4 | | 5 | | 6 | | 7 | | 8 | | 9 | | Pos | Pts |
| Year | Class | Team | R1 | R2 | R1 | R2 | R1 | R2 | R1 | R2 | R1 | R2 | R1 | R2 | R1 | R2 | R1 | R2 | R1 | R2 | Pos | Pts |
|---|---|---|---|---|---|---|---|---|---|---|---|---|---|---|---|---|---|---|---|---|---|---|
| 2022 | Superstock | Ducati | ATL; 1 | ATL; 1 | VIR; 4 | VIR; 1 | RAM; 2 | RAM; 3 | RID; 1 | RID; 1 | MON; 1 | MON; 1 | BRA; 2 | BRA; 2 | PIT; 2 | PIT; 1 | NJR; 2 | NJR; 4 | ALA; 2 | ALA; 1 | 1st | 387 |

=== Grand Prix motorcycle racing ===
==== By season ====
| Season | Class | Motorcycle | Team | Number | Race | Win | Podium | Pole | FLap | Pts | Plcd |
|---|---|---|---|---|---|---|---|---|---|---|---|
| 2014 | Moto2 | Caterham Suter | AirAsia Caterham | 2 | 10 | | | | | | NC |
| Total | | | | | 10 | | | | | | |

==== Races by year ====
| Year | Class | Bike | 1 | 2 | 3 | 4 | 5 | 6 | 7 | 8 | 9 | 10 | 11 | 12 | 13 | 14 | 15 | 16 | 17 | 18 | Pos | Points |
|---|---|---|---|---|---|---|---|---|---|---|---|---|---|---|---|---|---|---|---|---|---|---|
| 2014 | Moto2 | Caterham Suter | QAT; Ret | AME; Ret | ARG | SPA | FRA; 22 | ITA; Ret | CAT; 16 | NED; 18 | GER; Ret | INP; 28 | CZE; 21 | GBR; 24 | RSM | ARA | JPN | AUS | MAL | VAL | NC | 0 |

=== MotoAmerica SuperBike Championship ===
==== Results by year ====
| Year | Class | Team | 1 | | 2 | | | 3 | | 4 | | 5 | | | 6 | | 7 | | | 8 | | | 9 | | | 10 | | Pos | Pts |
| Year | Class | Team | R1 | R2 | R1 | R2 | R3 | R1 | R2 | R1 | R2 | R1 | R2 | R3 | R1 | R2 | R1 | R2 | R3 | R1 | R2 | R3 | R1 | R2 | R3 | R1 | R2 | Pos | Pts |
|---|---|---|---|---|---|---|---|---|---|---|---|---|---|---|---|---|---|---|---|---|---|---|---|---|---|---|---|---|---|
| 2019 | SuperBike | Suzuki | ATL; Ret | ATL; 5 | COA; 4 | COA; 1 | | VIR; Ret | VIR; 7 | RAM; 4 | RAM; 1 | UMC; 6 | UMC; 4 | | LGS; Ret | LGS; 4 | SON; Ret | SON; 3 | | PIT; 7 | PIT; 3 | | NJR; 7 | NJR; 7 | | BAR; 4 | BAR; 7 | 5th | 213 |
| 2020 | SuperBike | BMW | RAM; 6 | RAM; 3 | RAM; 7 | RAM; 5 | | ATL; Ret | ATL; 7 | PIT; 7 | PIT; 4 | TRD; 6 | TRD; 5 | | NJR; 10 | NJR; Ret | ALA; 8 | ALA; 6 | | BRI; 5 | BRI; 6 | BRI; 4 | LGS; 7 | LGS; 8 | LGS; 13 | | | 6th | 176 |
| 2021 | SuperBike | Yamaha | ATL; 3 | ATL; 3 | VIR; 3 | VIR; 4 | | RAM; 5 | RAM; 5 | TRD; 2 | TRD; 2 | LGS; 5 | LGS; 5 | | BRA | BRA | PIT | PIT | | NJR; 6 | NJR; 3 | NJR; 3 | ALA; 9 | ALA; Ret | ALA; 10 | | | 6th | 200 |
| 2023 | SuperBike | Ducati | ATL; 3 | ATL; 4 | BAR; 6 | BAR; 6 | | RAM; 3 | RAM; 1 | TRD; 3 | TRD; 3 | LGS; 2 | LGS; 3 | LGS; 2 | BRA; 3 | BRA; Ret | PIT; 6 | PIT; 3 | PIT; 3 | TEX; Ret | TEX; 1 | | NJR; 5 | NJR; Ret | | | | 2nd | 272 |
| 2024 | SuperBike | Ducati | ATL; 5 | ATL; 9 | ALA; 3 | ALA; 21 | ALA; 4 | RAM; 9 | RAM; 1 | BRA; 2 | BRA; 2 | RID; 11 | RID; 1 | | MON; 2 | MON; 1 | OHI; 1 | OHI; 1 | | TEX; 2 | TEX; 3 | TEX; 2 | NJR; 1 | NJR; 6 | | | | 1st | 335 |
| 2025 | SuperBike | Ducati | ALA; 5 | ALA; 3 | ATL; 3 | ATL; 3 | | RAM; 1 | RAM; 1 | RID; 1 | RID; 1 | MON; 1 | MON; 2 | MON; 2 | VIR; 3 | VIR; 14 | OHI | OHI | | TEX | TEX | | NJE | NJE | | | | 1st* | 242* |
