= 2026 Formula Regional Americas Championship =

Motor racing competition

The 2026 Formula Regional Americas Championship was the ninth season of the FIA-sanctioned F3/FR-level series across North America, and the seventh season under the Formula Regional moniker after a rebrand in 2020. The series is promoted by SCCA Pro Racing, the professional racing division of the Sports Car Club of America.

The 2026 season was held over eight race weekends. It started in April and finished in October. Toney Driver Development driver Brady Golan won the Drivers' Championship title with two races to spare and in doing so also helped his team win their first Teams' Championship title. Runner-up Evagoras Papasavvas took the Rookie class title driving for Crosslink Motorsports, while Hillenburg Motorsports driver Whitney Strickland took the Masters' class title.

== Teams and drivers ==
All drivers competed with Ligier JS F3 cars on Hankook tires powered by mountune MK20R engine power units based on the Honda K20C1 engine.

Team	No.	Driver	Status	Rounds
(Canada) Jensen Global Advisors	1	(United States) Aiden Zelaya	R	5, 7
(Canada) Jensen Global Advisors	2	(United States) Robert Arana Jr.	R	5, 7–8
(United States) Toney Driver Development	5	(United States) Luke Powers	R	1–2, 4–8
(United States) Toney Driver Development	7	(United States) Christian Bogle		All
(United States) Toney Driver Development	40	(United States) Brady Golan		All
(United States) Crosslink Motorsports	8	(Mexico) Alejandro Bobadilla	R	All
(United States) Crosslink Motorsports	13	(United States) Barrett Wolfe		1–4
(United States) Crosslink Motorsports	14	(United States) Aidan Schuh	R	All
(United States) Crosslink Motorsports	24	(Canada) Kevin Janzen	M	All
(United States) Crosslink Motorsports	29	(United States) Kekai Hauanio	R	All
(United States) Crosslink Motorsports	71	(United States) Evagoras Papasavvas	R	All
(United States) Kiwi Motorsport	9	(United States) Harbir Dass	R	All
(United States) Kiwi Motorsport	10	(United States) Cooper Shipman	R	All
(United States) Hillenburg Motorsports	25	(United States) Eric Wisniewski	R	1–4, 7–8
(United States) Hillenburg Motorsports	21	(United States) Whitney Strickland	M R	1–5, 8
(Canada) Atlantic Racing Team	77	(United States) Whitney Strickland	M R	6
(Canada) Atlantic Racing Team	77	(United States) Jake Pollack		1
(Canada) Atlantic Racing Team	88	(Canada) James Lawley		1–4, 6, 8
(United States) MLT Motorsports	75	(United States) Jonathan Cottrill	R	1
(United States) Momentum Motorsports	07	(United States) Anthony Autiello	M	1, 4–6, 8

Icon	Status
R	Rookie
M	Masters' class

- Fernando Rivera was originally announced to join Crosslink Motorsport in FR Americas, before he elected to join the team's F4 US outfit instead.

== Calendar ==
The 2026 calendar was announced on 2 October 2025. The championship visited the same eight locations as it did the year before.

Round		Circuit	Date	Support bill	Map of circuit locations
1	R1	(United States) NOLA Motorsports Park, Avondale	April 11	SVRA Sprint Series; Formula 4 United States Championship; Ligier Junior Formula Championship	2026 Formula Regional Americas Championship is located in the United States
1	R2	(United States) NOLA Motorsports Park, Avondale	April 12	SVRA Sprint Series; Formula 4 United States Championship; Ligier Junior Formula Championship	2026 Formula Regional Americas Championship is located in the United States
1	R3	(United States) NOLA Motorsports Park, Avondale	April 12	SVRA Sprint Series; Formula 4 United States Championship; Ligier Junior Formula Championship	2026 Formula Regional Americas Championship is located in the United States
2	R4	(United States) Road America, Elkhart Lake	May 16	SVRA Sprint Series; Formula 4 United States Championship; Ligier Junior Formula Championship	2026 Formula Regional Americas Championship is located in the United States
2	R5	(United States) Road America, Elkhart Lake	May 17	SVRA Sprint Series; Formula 4 United States Championship; Ligier Junior Formula Championship	2026 Formula Regional Americas Championship is located in the United States
2	R6	(United States) Road America, Elkhart Lake	May 17	SVRA Sprint Series; Formula 4 United States Championship; Ligier Junior Formula Championship	2026 Formula Regional Americas Championship is located in the United States
3	R7	(United States) Mid-Ohio Sports Car Course, Lexington	June 13	Formula 4 United States Championship; Ligier Junior Formula Championship	2026 Formula Regional Americas Championship is located in the United States
3	R8	(United States) Mid-Ohio Sports Car Course, Lexington	June 14	Formula 4 United States Championship; Ligier Junior Formula Championship	2026 Formula Regional Americas Championship is located in the United States
4	R9	(United States) Indianapolis Motor Speedway, Speedway	June 20	SVRA Sprint Series; Trans-Am-Series; Vintage Sports 2000 North America; Historic Stock Car Racing Association	2026 Formula Regional Americas Championship is located in the United States
4	R10	(United States) Indianapolis Motor Speedway, Speedway	June 21	SVRA Sprint Series; Trans-Am-Series; Vintage Sports 2000 North America; Historic Stock Car Racing Association	2026 Formula Regional Americas Championship is located in the United States
4	R11	(United States) Indianapolis Motor Speedway, Speedway	June 21	SVRA Sprint Series; Trans-Am-Series; Vintage Sports 2000 North America; Historic Stock Car Racing Association	2026 Formula Regional Americas Championship is located in the United States
5	R12	(United States) New Jersey Motorsports Park, Millville	August 1	SVRA Sprint Series; Formula 4 United States Championship; Ligier Junior Formula Championship	2026 Formula Regional Americas Championship is located in the United States
5	R13	(United States) New Jersey Motorsports Park, Millville	August 2	SVRA Sprint Series; Formula 4 United States Championship; Ligier Junior Formula Championship	2026 Formula Regional Americas Championship is located in the United States
5	R14	(United States) New Jersey Motorsports Park, Millville	August 2	SVRA Sprint Series; Formula 4 United States Championship; Ligier Junior Formula Championship	2026 Formula Regional Americas Championship is located in the United States
6	R15	(Canada) Canadian Tire Motorsports Park, Bowmanville	September 4	Trans-Am-Series; Formula 4 United States Championship; NASCAR Canada Series; Radical Cup Canada presented by Michelin	2026 Formula Regional Americas Championship is located in the United States
6	R16	(Canada) Canadian Tire Motorsports Park, Bowmanville	September 5	Trans-Am-Series; Formula 4 United States Championship; NASCAR Canada Series; Radical Cup Canada presented by Michelin	2026 Formula Regional Americas Championship is located in the United States
6	R17	(Canada) Canadian Tire Motorsports Park, Bowmanville	September 6	Trans-Am-Series; Formula 4 United States Championship; NASCAR Canada Series; Radical Cup Canada presented by Michelin	2026 Formula Regional Americas Championship is located in the United States
7	R18	(United States) Virginia International Raceway, Alton	September 19	SVRA Sprint Series; Formula 4 United States Championship; Ligier Junior Formula Championship	2026 Formula Regional Americas Championship is located in the United States
7	R19	(United States) Virginia International Raceway, Alton	September 20	SVRA Sprint Series; Formula 4 United States Championship; Ligier Junior Formula Championship	2026 Formula Regional Americas Championship is located in the United States
8	R20	(United States) Barber Motorsports Park, Birmingham	October 17	SVRA Sprint Series; Formula 4 United States Championship; Ligier Junior Formula Championship	2026 Formula Regional Americas Championship is located in the United States
8	R21	(United States) Barber Motorsports Park, Birmingham	October 18	SVRA Sprint Series; Formula 4 United States Championship; Ligier Junior Formula Championship	2026 Formula Regional Americas Championship is located in the United States

== Season report ==
=== First half ===
The 2026 Formula Regional Americas Championship began at NOLA Motorsports Park. Crosslink's Evagoras Papasavvas claimed pole position in qualifying, but contact between him and teammate Kekai Hauanio saw both drop down the order at the start of the first race. That handed the lead to Toney's Brady Golan, and he would go on to win ahead of teammate Christian Bogle. Crosslink's Barrett Wolfe finished third on the road, but a post-race penalty saw him lose his podium to Kiwi Motorsport's Cooper Shipman. Race two began with polesitter Golan stalling on the grid and retiring. Hauanio took over in front before a gearbox issue dropped him behind eventual winner Papasavvas and Shipman. Papasavvas started race three from pole position, but fell behind Hauanio in the opening part of the race. Shipman also got past Papasavvas before claiming the lead to end the weekend with his maiden victory. A post-race penalty dropped Papasavvas to sixth, handing third to Toney's Luke Powers and awarding Shipman a 13-point championship lead.

Road America hosted the second round of the season, and Papasavvas took a second pole position in qualifying. Golan qualified second to start the opening race alongside him, and after a slow start for the polesitter, Golan was able to take the lead right away. Papasavvas fell to seventh as Shipman slotted into second, before the former was able to rise back up to fourth. A mid-race restart then allowed him to take second place in a three-wide moment that saw Kiwi's Harbir Dass take third as Shipman dropped to eighth. Race two saw Papasavvas led the field to green in a rolling start as he defended his lead. Rain then began to fall, which led to multiple incidents. Eventually, a red flag was thrown to allow drivers to switch to wet tires. Three laps were left on the final restart, and Papasavvas was able to fight off Hauanio to take victory as Bogle took third after post-race penalties. Half points were awarded for the second race before race three was cancelled due to the persistent intense rain, leaving Papasavvas 12.5 points ahead of Shipman.

Pole position for round three of the season at Mid-Ohio went to Golan ahead of Papasavvas. He lost that advantage after both Hauanio and Papasavvas overtook him on the opening lap of race one. The trio ran closely together for the whole race - a safety car interruption brought a chance for Papasavvas to challenge the leader, but Hauanio stayed faultless to take his maiden victory by just over half a second. Shipman and Hauanio formed the front row for the second race, but a collision between the pair saw both drop out the top four. Papasavvas assumed the lead as Golan and Dass slotted in behind him. Two safety car phases punctured the race, but Papasavvas was not challenged through the two subsequent restarts as he took victory to extend his lead over Golan to 31 points. A post-race penalty for Dass dropped him down the order, handing third place to Bogle.

The first half of the season concluded at the Indianapolis Motor Speedway with Golan taking pole position again. Shipman, who started alongside him, was attacked by Bogle straight away at the start of the first race. He could not find a way past, however, and dropped back down the order. Papasavvas, who had started 15th after a bad qualifying, worked his way up the order, claiming third by the halfway point before overtaking Shipman with four minutes to go. Papasavvas started race two from pole position as Golan and Hauanio battled behind him. Hauanio then dropped down with a flat tire, before Golan was able to take the lead off Papasavvas on a mid-race restart. The latter then dropped away, with Shipman able to overtake him for second on the final lap. The third race saw roles reversed, with poleman Golan initially bested by Papasavvas. Once again, a safety car restart allowed Golan to retake the lead, which he turned into his third win of the weekend, with Hauanio third. That saw him close up to 10.5 points behind Papasavvas.

=== Second half ===
Round five was held at New Jersey Motorsports Park, where Papasavvas was awarded pole position after Shipman was handed a penalty for impeding. The latter then jumped the rolling start of the first race and took the lead as Papasavvas dropped to the rear of the field with a mechanical issue. That promoted Hauanio to second, and he threatened Golan until contact with Shipman on the final lap. Post-race penalties for both Golan and Hauanio meant Powers inherited his maiden victory ahead of Crosslink's Alejandro Bobadilla and Bogle. Papasavvas was back on pole position for the second race, before Shipman overtook him on lap nine and managed a safety car restart to take victory. Powers took third on the road, but another post-race penalty saw Golan inherit the podium place. The latter started the third race from first place, with Papasavvas fourth behind Shipman and Hauanio, who crashed again and dropped out of contention. That left Papasavvas able to catch and pass Golan, taking victory to end the weekend leading Golan by 8.5 points.

Next came the sole round abroad as the series travelled to Canadian Tire Motorsports Park. Papasavvas led Golan in qualifying, but his first race ended in retirement after he dropped to twelfth on the opening lap and flipped his car twice when attempting to recover up the order. Golan assumed the lead from second off the line, while further mistakes for Shipman and Hauanio helped Powers secure second place ahead of Shipman. Golan won and took over the championship lead, before another pole position for Papasavvas ended in a non-score in race two after he spun on lap five and beached his car. That handed the lead to Shipman, before Hauanio was able to first pass Golan and then Shipman on two safety car restarts to take victory. Hauanio had pole position for race three, but suffered a suspension failure, before Golan then hit Shipman when fighting for the lead, with the former retiring and the latter dropping to eighth. Papasavvas took the lead and led Powers and Atlantic's James Lawley to end the weekend 10.5 points behind Golan.

Golan took pole position for the penultimate round, a double-header held at Virginia International Raceway. Hauanio started race one from second place, and the top two built a gap as Papasavvas rose from fifth to fourth and attacked Shipman for third. That ended in a collision, taking both back to the rear of the field. Hauanio stayed close to Golan and took the lead with five minutes to go. A late safety car then sealed his victory as Powers inherited third after the earlier collision. Hauanio also had pole position for race two, which he converted into an early lead as Papasavvas and Golan fought over second. That fight ended with a technical issue for the former, sending him into retirement. With his non-score, a win for Golan would see him win the championship. A safety car set up a one-lap shootout, and Golan passed Hauanio to win by 0.2 seconds and clinch the title.

== Race results ==
Round		Circuit	Pole position	Fastest lap	Winning driver	Winning team	Rookie winner	Masters winner
1	R1	(United States) NOLA Motorsports Park	(United States) Evagoras Papasavvas	(United States) Brady Golan	(United States) Brady Golan	(United States) Toney Driver Development	(United States) Cooper Shipman	(United States) Whitney Strickland
1	R2	(United States) NOLA Motorsports Park		(United States) Evagoras Papasavvas	(United States) Evagoras Papasavvas	(United States) Crosslink Motorsports	(United States) Evagoras Papasavvas	(United States) Whitney Strickland
1	R3	(United States) NOLA Motorsports Park		(United States) Cooper Shipman	(United States) Cooper Shipman	(United States) Kiwi Motorsport	(United States) Cooper Shipman	(United States) Anthony Autiello
2	R4	(United States) Road America	(United States) Evagoras Papasavvas	(United States) Evagoras Papasavvas	(United States) Brady Golan	(United States) Toney Driver Development	(United States) Evagoras Papasavvas	(United States) Whitney Strickland
2	R5	(United States) Road America		(United States) Evagoras Papasavvas	(United States) Evagoras Papasavvas	(United States) Crosslink Motorsports	(United States) Evagoras Papasavvas	(United States) Whitney Strickland
2	R6	(United States) Road America		Race cancelled due to inclement weather				
3	R7	(United States) Mid-Ohio Sports Car Course	(United States) Brady Golan	(United States) Cooper Shipman	(United States) Kekai Hauanio	(United States) Crosslink Motorsports	(United States) Kekai Hauanio	(United States) Whitney Strickland
3	R8	(United States) Mid-Ohio Sports Car Course		(United States) Cooper Shipman	(United States) Evagoras Papasavvas	(United States) Crosslink Motorsports	(United States) Evagoras Papasavvas	(United States) Whitney Strickland
4	R9	(United States) Indianapolis Motor Speedway	(United States) Brady Golan	(United States) Evagoras Papasavvas	(United States) Brady Golan	(United States) Toney Driver Development	(United States) Evagoras Papasavvas	(United States) Whitney Strickland
4	R10	(United States) Indianapolis Motor Speedway		(United States) Brady Golan	(United States) Brady Golan	(United States) Toney Driver Development	(United States) Cooper Shipman	(United States) Anthony Autiello
4	R11	(United States) Indianapolis Motor Speedway		(United States) Brady Golan	(United States) Brady Golan	(United States) Toney Driver Development	(United States) Evagoras Papasavvas	(Canada) Kevin Janzen
5	R12	(United States) New Jersey Motorsports Park	(United States) Evagoras Papasavvas (Note: Cooper Shipman set the fastest time in qualifying but received a 3-place grid penalty for impeding another driver during the session. Evagoras Papasavvas, who set the second fastest time, was promoted to pole position.)	(United States) Evagoras Papasavvas	(United States) Luke Powers (Note: Brady Golan originally won the race, but later received a 5-second time penalty for a false start. Luke Powers, initially classified second, thus inherited the win.)	(United States) Toney Driver Development	(United States) Luke Powers	(United States) Whitney Strickland
5	R13	(United States) New Jersey Motorsports Park		(United States) Brady Golan	(United States) Cooper Shipman	(United States) Kiwi Motorsport	(United States) Cooper Shipman	(United States) Whitney Strickland
5	R14	(United States) New Jersey Motorsports Park		(United States) Cooper Shipman	(United States) Evagoras Papasavvas	(United States) Crosslink Motorsports	(United States) Evagoras Papasavvas	(United States) Anthony Autiello
6	R15	(Canada) Canadian Tire Motorsports Park	(United States) Evagoras Papasavvas	(United States) Evagoras Papasavvas	(United States) Brady Golan	(United States) Toney Driver Development	(United States) Luke Powers	(Canada) Kevin Janzen
6	R16	(Canada) Canadian Tire Motorsports Park		(United States) Kekai Hauanio	(United States) Kekai Hauanio	(United States) Crosslink Motorsports	(United States) Kekai Hauanio	(Canada) Kevin Janzen
6	R17	(Canada) Canadian Tire Motorsports Park		(United States) Evagoras Papasavvas	(United States) Evagoras Papasavvas	(United States) Crosslink Motorsports	(United States) Evagoras Papasavvas	(United States) Whitney Strickland
7	R18	(United States) Virginia International Raceway	(United States) Brady Golan	(United States) Kekai Hauanio	(United States) Kekai Hauanio	(United States) Crosslink Motorsports	(United States) Kekai Hauanio	(Canada) Kevin Janzen
7	R19	(United States) Virginia International Raceway		(United States) Kekai Hauanio	(United States) Brady Golan	(United States) Toney Driver Development	(United States) Kekai Hauanio	(Canada) Kevin Janzen
8	R20	(United States) Barber Motorsports Park	(United States) Kekai Hauanio	(United States) Cooper Shipman	(United States) Brady Golan	(United States) Toney Driver Development	(United States) Kekai Hauanio	(United States) Anthony Autiello
8	R21	(United States) Barber Motorsports Park		(United States) Evagoras Papasavvas	(United States) Cooper Shipman	(United States) Kiwi Motorsport	(United States) Cooper Shipman	(Canada) Kevin Janzen

== Championship standings ==
=== Scoring system ===
Points were awarded to the top ten classified finishers as follows:

Position	**1st**	**2nd**	**3rd**	**4th**	**5th**	**6th**	**7th**	**8th**	**9th**	**10th**
Points	25	18	15	12	10	8	6	4	2	1

=== Drivers' Championship ===
Pos	Driver	NOL (United States)			ROA (United States)			MOH (United States)		IMS (United States)			NJM (United States)			MOS (Canada)			VIR (United States)		ALA (United States)		Pts
Pos	Driver	R1	R2	R3	R4	R5 (Note: Half points were awarded in the second race at Road America as less than 50% of laps were completed under green flag conditions.)	R6	R7	R8	R9	R10	R11 (Note: Half points were awarded in the third race at IMS as less than 50% of laps were completed under green flag conditions.)	R12	R13	R14	R15	R16	R17	R18	R19	R20 (Note: Half points were awarded in the first race at Barber as not enough laps were completed.)	R21	Pts
1	(United States) Brady Golan	1	Ret	8	1	10†	C	**3**	2	**1**	1	1	4	3	2	1	3	8	**2**	1	1	8	298.5
2	(United States) Evagoras Papasavvas	**4**	1	6	**2**	1	C	2	1	2	3	2	**NC**	2	1	**Ret**	12	1	11	Ret	7	5	241.5
3	(United States) Cooper Shipman	3	2	1	8	9	C	4	4	3	2	4	6	1	14†	3	2	Ret	Ret	5	3	1	234.5
4	(United States) Kekai Hauanio	7	3	2	6	2	C	1	10	5	10	3	12	4	8	9	1	Ret	1	2	**2**	Ret	195.5
5	(United States) Christian Bogle	2	6	4	4	3	C	5	3	8	Ret	Ret	3	6	4	10	7	4	Ret	4	4	2	176.5
6	(United States) Luke Powers	6	5	3	7	4	C			4	6	8	1	14	5	2	Ret	2	3	11	6	3	172
7	(United States) Harbir Dass	14	11	13	3	Ret	C	6	12	11	4	6	5	5	3	4	8	7	6	8	5	6	121
8	(Mexico) Alejandro Bobadilla	Ret	7	14	10	11†	C	7	11	6	5	Ret	2	8	6	6	6	5	4	7	9	4	118
9	(United States) Aidan Schuh	12	Ret	11	Ret	7	C	8	5	DNS	Ret	7†	7	7	7	5	5	6	5	3	8	11	93
10	(Canada) James Lawley	5	8	10	5	Ret	C	10	6	7	Ret	Ret				8	4	3			10	10	72.5
11	(United States) Eric Wisniewski	8	10	5	9	Ret	C	12	7	9	9	5							7	6	11	7	52
12	(United States) Barrett Wolfe	9	4	9	Ret	5	C	9	Ret	14	7	9											30
13	(United States) Whitney Strickland	10	9	Ret	11	6	C	11	8	10	Ret	DNS	9	9	12	11	10	9			Ret	13	19
14	(Canada) Kevin Janzen	11	Ret	Ret	12	8	C	13	9	13	Ret	10	11	10	13	7	9	Ret	10	10	13	9	17.5
15	(United States) Aiden Zelaya												8	13†	9				9	Ret			8
16	(United States) Anthony Autiello	13	Ret	12						12	8	Ret	10	11	10	12	11	10†			12	12	7
17	(United States) Jonathan Cottrill	Ret	DNS	7																			6
18	(United States) Robert Arana Jr.												13†	12†	11				8	9	14	Ret	6
—	(United States) Jake Pollack	DNS	DNS	DNS																			0
Pos	Driver	R1	R2	R3	R4	R5	R6	R7	R8	R9	R10	R11	R12	R13	R14	R15	R16	R17	R18	R19	R20	R21	Pts
Pos	Driver	NOL (United States)			ROA (United States)			MOH (United States)		IMS (United States)			NJM (United States)			MOS (Canada)			VIR (United States)		ALA (United States)		Pts

Colour	Result
Gold	Winner
Silver	Second place
Bronze	Third place
Green	Points classification
Blue	Non-points classification
Blue	Non-classified finish (NC)
Purple	Retired, not classified (Ret)
Red	Did not qualify (DNQ)
Red	Did not pre-qualify (DNPQ)
Black	Disqualified (DSQ)
White	Did not start (DNS)
White	Withdrew (WD)
White	Race cancelled (C)
Blank	Did not practice (DNP)
Blank	Did not arrive (DNA)
Blank	Excluded (EX)

**Bold** – Pole

Italics – Fastest Lap

† — Did not finish, but classified

=== Masters' Class ===
For 2026, a separate scoring system for the Masters' class was introduced. Points were awarded to the top ten classified finishers as follows:

Position	**1st**	**2nd**	**3rd**	**4th**	**5th**	**6th**	**7th**	**8th**	**9th**	**10th**
Points	12	9	7	5	3	2	2	1	1	1

Pos	Driver	NOL (United States)			ROA (United States)			MOH (United States)		IMS (United States)			NJM (United States)			MOS (Canada)			VIR (United States)		ALA (United States)		Pts
Pos	Driver	R1	R2	R3	R4	R5	R6	R7	R8	R9	R10	R11	R12	R13	R14	R15	R16	R17	R18	R19	R20	R21	Pts
1	(United States) Whitney Strickland	1	1	Ret	1	1	C	1	1	1	Ret	DNS	1	1	2	2	2	1			Ret	3	148
2	(Canada) Kevin Janzen	2	Ret	Ret	2	2	C	2	2	3	Ret	1	3	2	3	1	1	Ret	1	1	2	1	141
3	(United States) Anthony Autiello	3	Ret	1						2	1	Ret	2	3	1	3	3	2			1	2	106
Pos	Driver	R1	R2	R3	R4	R5	R6	R7	R8	R9	R10	R11	R12	R13	R14	R15	R16	R17	R18	R19	R20	R21	Pts
Pos	Driver	NOL (United States)			ROA (United States)			MOH (United States)		IMS (United States)			NJM (United States)			MOS (Canada)			VIR (United States)		ALA (United States)		Pts

=== Teams' Championship ===
Each team acquired the points earned by their two highest finishing drivers in each race.

Pos	Team	NOL (United States)			ROA (United States)			MOH (United States)		IMS (United States)			NJM (United States)			MOS (Canada)			VIR (United States)		ALA (United States)		Pts
Pos	Team	R1	R2	R3	R4	R5	R6	R7	R8	R9	R10	R11	R12	R13	R14	R15	R16	R17	R18	R19	R20	R21	Pts
1	(United States) Toney Driver Development	1	5	3	1	3	C	3	2	1	1	1	1	3	2	1	3	2	2	1	1	2	589.5
1	(United States) Toney Driver Development	2	6	4	4	4	C	5	3	4	6	8	3	6	4	2	7	4	3	4	4	3	589.5
2	(United States) Crosslink Motorsports	4	1	2	2	1	C	1	1	2	3	2	2	2	1	5	1	1	1	2	2	4	558
2	(United States) Crosslink Motorsports	7	3	6	6	2	C	2	5	5	5	3	7	4	6	6	5	5	4	3	7	5	558
3	(United States) Kiwi Motorsport	3	2	1	3	9	C	4	4	3	2	4	5	1	3	3	2	7	6	5	3	1	357.5
3	(United States) Kiwi Motorsport	14	11	13	8	Ret	C	6	12	11	4	6	6	5	14†	4	8	Ret	Ret	8	5	6	357.5
4	(Canada) Atlantic Racing Team	5	8	10	5	Ret	C	10	6	7	Ret	Ret				8	4	3			10	10	75.5
4	(Canada) Atlantic Racing Team	DNS	DNS	DNS												11	10	9					75.5
5	(United States) Hillenburg Motorsports	8	9	5	9	6	C	11	7	9	9	5	9	9	12				7	6	11	7	68
5	(United States) Hillenburg Motorsports	10	10	Ret	11	Ret	C	12	8	10	Ret	DNS									Ret	13	68
6	(Canada) Jensen Global Advisors												8	12†	9				8	9	14	Ret	14
6	(Canada) Jensen Global Advisors												13†	13†	11				9	Ret			14
7	(United States) Momentum Motorsports	13	Ret	12						12	8	Ret	10	11	10	12	11	10†			12	12	7
8	(United States) MLT Motorsports	Ret	DNS	7																			6
Pos	Team	R1	R2	R3	R4	R5	R6	R7	R8	R9	R10	R11	R12	R13	R14	R15	R16	R17	R18	R19	R20	R21	Pts
Pos	Team	NOL (United States)			ROA (United States)			MOH (United States)		IMS (United States)			NJM (United States)			MOS (Canada)			VIR (United States)		ALA (United States)		Pts
