= Kim Green (racing driver) =

British-Australian former racing driver

Kim Green is a British-Australian former racing driver who was the co-owner and Chief Executive Officer of Andretti Green Racing, a racing team in the Indycar Series.

== Biographical ==
Green is a native of the United Kingdom who grew up in Australia. He now resides in St. Petersburg, Florida. He began his racing career in 1981 with Newman Racing in the Can-Am series. After winning five wins and six poles during the 1981-82 racing seasons, Green joined the Champ Car team Forsythe Racing in 1983. Over the next decade, Green continued honing his managerial skills in the CART series.

== Team ownership ==
In 1994, Green joined his brother Barry's Team Green as team manager, and competed in the 1994 CART IndyCar World Series with driver Jacques Villeneuve, eventually winning both the 1995 Indianapolis 500 and the CART PPG IndyCar World Series Cup that same year. In 1996 Team Green became known as the Brahma Sports Team for a season, with driver Raul Boesel. In 1997 KOOL cigarettes took over as a major sponsor with Parker Johnstone, and the team was renamed Team KOOL Green, before expanding to a two-car effort in 1998 with Paul Tracy and rising youngster Dario Franchitti. In 2001, Michael Andretti joined the team in a separate effort headed by Kim Green, known as Team Motorola. In July 2002, Andretti purchased a controlling stake in the team which became Andretti Green Racing. Shortly thereafter the team moved to the IRL IndyCar Series where it won league championships in 2004, 2005 and 2007 and the Indianapolis 500 in 2005 and 2007. Green and fellow co-owner Kevin Savoree left AGR in September 2009 to run Green Savoree Racing Promotions, an auto race promotion company. Currently, GSRP promote Indycar Series races in St. Petersburg, Florida, Toronto, Ontario, Canada and Portland, Oregon. On March 2, 2011 Green Savoree purchased the Mid-Ohio Sports Car Course and will promote races at that site as well.

== Race promotion ==
Green co-owns Green Savoree Racing Promotions, which owns Mid-Ohio and promotes other IndyCar races at St Petersburg, Markham and Portland.
