= 2024 MotoAmerica Superbike Championship =

The 2024 MotoAmerica Superbike Championship season was the 48th season of the premier class of circuit-based motorcycle racing in the United States and the tenth with current promoter Wayne Rainey and the KRAVE group (dba MotoAmerica).

== Calendar and Results ==
The previous year's race held at the Pittsburgh International Race Complex in Pennsylvania was replaced by a race in the middle of August at the Mid-Ohio Sports Car Course in Ohio.

Round		Circuit	Date	Pole position	Fastest lap	Winning rider	Winning team
1	R1	(Georgia (U.S. state)) Road Atlanta, Georgia	April 19–21	(United States) Bobby Fong	(United States) Josh Herrin	(United States) Cameron Beaubier	Tytlers Cycle Racing
1	R2	(Georgia (U.S. state)) Road Atlanta, Georgia	April 19–21	(United States) Bobby Fong	(United States) Cameron Beaubier	(United States) Jake Gagne	Attack Performance Yamaha
2	R1	Barber Motorsports Park, Alabama	May 17–19	(United States) Cameron Beaubier	(United States) Cameron Beaubier	(South Africa) Cameron Petersen	Attack Performance Yamaha
2	R2	Barber Motorsports Park, Alabama	May 17–19	(United States) Cameron Beaubier	(United States) Cameron Beaubier	(United States) Cameron Beaubier	Tytlers Cycle Racing
2	R3	Barber Motorsports Park, Alabama	May 17–19	(United States) Cameron Beaubier	(United States) Cameron Beaubier	(United States) Cameron Beaubier	Tytlers Cycle Racing
3	R1	Road America, Wisconsin	May 31–June 2	(United States) Cameron Beaubier	(South Africa) Cameron Petersen	(South Africa) Cameron Petersen	Attack Performance Yamaha
3	R2	Road America, Wisconsin	May 31–June 2	(United States) Cameron Beaubier	(United States) Josh Herrin	(United States) Josh Herrin	Warhorse HSBK Racing Ducati
4	R1	Brainerd International Raceway, Minnesota	June 14–16	(United States) Bobby Fong	(South Africa) Cameron Petersen	(United States) Bobby Fong	Wrench Motorcycles
4	R2	Brainerd International Raceway, Minnesota	June 14–16	(United States) Bobby Fong	(United States) Bobby Fong	(United States) Bobby Fong	Wrench Motorcycles
5	R1	(Washington (state)) The Ridge Motorsports Park, Washington	June 28–30	(France) Loris Baz	(United States) Jake Gagne	(South Africa) Cameron Petersen	Attack Performance Yamaha
5	R2	(Washington (state)) The Ridge Motorsports Park, Washington	June 28–30	(France) Loris Baz	(United States) Josh Herrin	(United States) Josh Herrin	Warhorse HSBK Racing Ducati
6	R1	WeatherTech Raceway Laguna Seca, Monterey, California	July 12–14	(United States) Cameron Beaubier	(United States) Cameron Beaubier	(United States) Cameron Beaubier	Tytlers Cycle Racing
6	R2	WeatherTech Raceway Laguna Seca, Monterey, California	July 12–14	(United States) Cameron Beaubier	(United States) Cameron Beaubier	(United States) Josh Herrin	Warhorse HSBK Racing Ducati
7	R1	Mid-Ohio Sports Car Course, Ohio	August 16–18	(United States) Cameron Beaubier	(United States) Josh Herrin	(United States) Josh Herrin	Warhorse HSBK Racing Ducati
7	R2	Mid-Ohio Sports Car Course, Ohio	August 16–18	(United States) Cameron Beaubier	(United States) Josh Herrin	(United States) Josh Herrin	Warhorse HSBK Racing Ducati
8	R1	Circuit of the Americas, Texas	September 13–15	(United States) Cameron Beaubier	(United States) Cameron Beaubier	(United States) Cameron Beaubier	Tytlers Cycle Racing
8	R2	Circuit of the Americas, Texas	September 13–15	(United States) Cameron Beaubier	(United States) Cameron Beaubier	(United States) Sean Dylan Kelly	TopPro Racing Team
8	R3	Circuit of the Americas, Texas	September 13–15	(United States) Cameron Beaubier	(United States) Cameron Beaubier	(United States) Cameron Beaubier	Tytlers Cycle Racing
9	R1	New Jersey Motorsports Park, New Jersey	September 27–29	(France) Loris Baz	(United States) Josh Herrin	(United States) Josh Herrin	Warhorse HSBK Racing Ducati
9	R2	New Jersey Motorsports Park, New Jersey	September 27–29	(France) Loris Baz	(United States) Bobby Fong	(France) Loris Baz	Warhorse HSBK Racing Ducati

== Teams and riders ==
2024 Entry List
Team	Constructor	No.	Rider		Rounds
Attack Performance Yamaha	Yamaha	1	(United States) Jake Gagne		1–7
Attack Performance Yamaha	Yamaha	34	(Spain) Xavi Forés		8–9
Attack Performance Yamaha	Yamaha	45	(South Africa) Cameron Petersen		1–9
Warhorse HSBK Racing Ducati	Ducati	2	(United States) Josh Herrin		1–9
Warhorse HSBK Racing Ducati	Ducati	76	(France) Loris Baz		1–9
Tytlers Cycle Racing	BMW	6	(United States) Cameron Beaubier		1–3, 5-9
Tytlers Cycle Racing	BMW	28	(Australia) Troy Herfoss		4
Tytlers Cycle Racing	BMW	95	(United States) J. D. Beach		1–9
BPR Racing	Yamaha	17	(United States) Bryce Prince	C	2, 4-6, 9
BPR Racing	Yamaha	101	(United States) Wyatt Farris	C	2, 4
BPR Racing	Yamaha	194	(United States) Deion Campbell	C	2, 4-6, 9
Visit Indiana/Tom Wood Powersports	BMW	21	(United States) Nolan Lamkin	C	1–9
Jones Honda	Honda	27	(United States) Ashton Yates	C	1–9
Vision Wheel M4 ECSTAR Suzuki	Suzuki	34	(Spain) Xavi Forés		2–6
Vision Wheel M4 ECSTAR Suzuki	Suzuki	54	(Mexico) Richie Escalante		1–2, 7-9
Vision Wheel M4 ECSTAR Suzuki	Suzuki	96	(United States) Brandon Paasch		1–9
TopPro Racing Team	BMW	40	(United States) Sean Dylan Kelly		1–9
TopPro Racing Team	BMW	89	(United States) Alex Arango	C	1–9
TopPro Racing Team	BMW	111	(United States) Agustin Sierra	C	2–6, 8-9
Nielsen Racing	Kawasaki	47	(United States) Justin Miest		4
Nielsen Racing	Kawasaki	114	(United States) P. R. Stafki		4
Wrench Motorcycles	Yamaha	50	(United States) Bobby Fong		1–9
Triple M	Suzuki	52	(United States) John Knowles	C	2, 4-5
Super Carl Racing	Honda	60	(United States) Carl Soltisz		
Real Steel Motorsports	Honda	69	(United States) Hayden Gillim		1–5, 7-8
3D Motorsports	Ducati	72	(United Kingdom) Steven Shakespeare		1–2, 4-5, 9
Jarritos Racing/Team GMR	Honda	74	(United States) Gabriel Da Silva	C	3
AMD Motorsport RK Racing	Honda	75	(Republic of Ireland) Richard Kerr	C	2, 4-5
FLO4LAW Racing	Yamaha	77	(United States) Bobby Davies	C	1–6, 8-9
FLO4LAW Racing	Yamaha	78	(United States) Benjamin Smith		1–9
Limitless Racing	Kawasaki	84	(United States) Joseph Giannotto	C	1–4, 6
Thrashed Bike Racing	Yamaha	88	(United States) Max Flinders		1–9
Smooth Fab Racing	Yamaha	91	(United States) JC Camacho	C	2, 4-5, 9
Edge Racing	BMW	92	(United States) Jason Waters	C	1–2, 4, 8-9
Team Brazil	BMW	94	(Brazil) Danilo Lewis	C	1–9
Aftercare Scheibe Racing	BMW	99	(United States) Ezra Beaubier		1–9
Blackall Racing	Yamaha	100	(United States) Tony Blackall		7
Team Germany - TSE Racing	BMW	119	(Germany) Stefan Dolipski		2, 4
Zlock Racing	Kawasaki	121	(United States) Brian Pinkstaff		5
Zlock Racing	Kawasaki	232	(United States) Kevin Pinkstaff		5
Motorsport Exotica	BMW	140	(United States) Andrew Lee	C	2, 4-6
Posse Racing	Suzuki	174	(United States) William Posse	C	1, 3
Red Lobo Racing	Suzuki	222	(United States) Manuel Segura	C	1–6, 8-9
Klotz Synthetic Lubricants/Gerardot Racing	Kawasaki	814	(United States) Josh Gerardot		2
Empressive Earth Gallery	Ducati	818	(United States) Kory Pappas		2, 4

Icon	Class
C	Superbike Cup entries

== Championship standings ==
=== Scoring system ===
Points are awarded to the top fifteen finishers. A rider has to finish the race to earn points. Pole winner is in bold, fastest lap is italicized.

Position	**1st**	**2nd**	**3rd**	**4th**	**5th**	**6th**	**7th**	**8th**	**9th**	**10th**	**11th**	**12th**	**13th**	**14th**	**15th**
Points	25	20	16	13	11	10	9	8	7	6	5	4	3	2	1

=== Riders' championship ===
Pos	Rider	Bike	ATL (Georgia (U.S. state))		ALA (Alabama)			RAM (Wisconsin)		BRA (Minnesota)		RID (Washington (state))		MON (California)		OHI (Ohio)		TEX (Texas)			NJE (New Jersey)		Pts
1	(United States) Josh Herrin	Ducati	5	9	3	21	4	9	**1**	2	2	11	1	2	1	1	1	2	3	2	1	6	335
2	(United States) Cameron Beaubier	BMW	1	2	**Ret**	**1**	**1**	**Ret**	DNS			Ret	8	**1**	**2**	**2**	**3**	**1**	**2**	**1**	4	4	280
3	(United States) Bobby Fong	Yamaha	**3**	**10**	9	5	2	8	2	**1**	**1**	18	2	Ret	4	6	5	6	5	Ret	2	3	249
4	(United States) Sean Dylan Kelly	BMW	4	5	4	2	3	Ret	6	4	Ret	17	5	4	3	5	2	Ret	1	3	7	2	237
5	(France) Loris Baz	Ducati	6	7	5	4	18	3	4	3	4	**8**	**4**	6	6	Ret	4	4	4	5	**3**	**1**	233
6	(South Africa) Cameron Petersen	Yamaha	15	3	1	3	21	1	Ret	5	3	1	3	3	Ret	DNS	8	11	7	10	6	18	205
7	(United States) Jake Gagne	Yamaha	2	1	2	8	7	2	5	8	7	2	9	5	5	9	10						192
8	(United States) J. D. Beach	BMW	7	4	7	Ret	Ret	4	3	7	6	10	11	Ret	8	3	6	5	9	7	Ret	15	152
9	(United States) Brandon Paasch	Suzuki	Ret	Ret	10	6	8	5	7	6	5	9	10	8	Ret	Ret	18	7	6	6	Ret	7	124
10	(United States) Ashton Yates	Honda	12	Ret	14	13	14	Ret	15	11	9	6	13	10	11	7	9	8	10	8	10	10	98
11	(United States) Benjamin Smith	Yamaha	11	11	12	9	15	7	9	13	13	Ret	Ret	11	10	8	11	10	Ret	9	9	8	96
12	(Spain) Xavi Forés	Suzuki/Yamaha			6	Ret	6	Ret	8	Ret	Ret	3	7	7	7			Ret	8	Ret	8	12	91
13	(Brazil) Danilo Lewis	BMW	17	12	20	14	13	6	10	15	12	4	12	9	9	11	15	9	11	13	Ret	13	85
14	(United States) Hayden Gillim	Honda	9	6	8	7	5	DNS	DNS	DNS	DNS	7	6			4	13	Ret					80
15	(Mexico) Richie Escalante	Suzuki	8	DNS	DNS	DNS	DNS									Ret	7	3	Ret	4	5	5	68
16	(United States) Max Flinders	Yamaha	10	Ret	13	10	10	12	12	10	11	19	16	16	14	13	14	Ret	Ret	11	19	16	52
17	(United States) Nolan Lamkin	BMW	13	8	16	17	16	Ret	11	24	14	Ret	15	Ret	13	12	12	13	13	12	12	DNS	44
18	(United States) Ezra Beaubier	BMW	14	18	19	DNS	DNS	DNS	13	12	10	12	17	14	16	10	DNS	12	12	Ret	15	17	36
19	(United States) Bryce Prince	Yamaha			11	11	9			16	16	Ret	DNS	12	12						11	11	35
20	(Republic of Ireland) Richard Kerr	Honda			15	12	11			14	15	5	Ret	15	15						14	9	35
21	(United States) Alex Arango	BMW	Ret	14	22	Ret	22	11	14	18	19	DNS	DNS	17	17	14	16	14	14	14	DNS	DNS	17
22	(Australia) Troy Herfoss	BMW								9	8												15
23	(United States) Deion Campbell	Yamaha			18	Ret	12			17	18	Ret	14	13	Ret						13	14	14
24	(United States) Agustin Sierra	BMW			Ret	Ret	Ret	13	18	21	20	13	20	19	DNS			16	16	15	DNS	DNS	7
25	(United States) Gabriel Da Silva	Honda						10	Ret														6
26	(United States) Jason Waters	BMW	Ret	13	Ret	16	17			DNS	DNS							Ret	15	Ret	16	Ret	4
27	(United States) Bobby Davies	Yamaha	Ret	15	26	20	20	14	17	22	DNS	Ret	21	20	19			15	Ret	16	17	19	4
28	(United States) John Knowles	Suzuki			25	Ret	DNS			Ret	DNS	14	DNS										2
29	(United States) Andrew Lee	BMW			Ret	15	Ret			DNS	DNS	DNS	DNS	Ret	DNS								1
29	(United States) Joseph Giannotto	Kawasaki	16	17	16	18	19	DNS	DNS	DNS	DNS			18	18								0
30	(United States) Tony Blackall	Yamaha														15	17						1
31	(United States) Brian Pinkstaff	Kawasaki										15	22										1
32	(United States) Manuel Segura	Suzuki	DNS	16	24	19	Ret	Ret	16	23	21	Ret	Ret	21	20			17	17	17	18	20	0
33	(United States) Kevin Pinkstaff	Kawasaki										16	18										0
34	(United States) Wyatt Farris	Yamaha			17	Ret	DNS			DNS	DNS												0
35	(United States) Justin Miest	Kawasaki								19	17												0
36	(United States) William Posse	Suzuki	18	19				DNS	DNS														0
37	(United States) JC Camacho	Yamaha			23	Ret	DNS			20	DNS	DNS	19								Ret	DNS	0
38	(United States) Kory Pappas	Ducati			DNS	DNS	DNS			Ret	Ret												0
39	(United States) P. R. Stafki	Kawasaki								Ret	DNS												0
40	(United Kingdom) Steven Shakespeare	Ducati	DNS	DNS	DNS	DNS	DNS			DNS	DNS										DNS	DNS	0
41	(Germany) Stefan Dolipski	BMW			DNS	DNS	DNS			DNS	DNS												0
42	(United States) Josh Gerardot	Kawasaki			DNS	DNS	DNS																0
Pos	Rider	Bike	ATL (Georgia (U.S. state))		ALA (Alabama)			RAM (Wisconsin)		BRA (Minnesota)		RID (Washington (state))		MON (California)		OHI (Ohio)		TEX (Texas)			NJE (New Jersey)		Pts

=== Superbike Cup ===
Pos	Rider	Bike	ATL (Georgia (U.S. state))		ALA (Alabama)			RAM (Wisconsin)		BRA (Minnesota)		RID (Washington (state))		MON (California)		OHI (Ohio)		TEX (Texas)			NJE (New Jersey)		Pts
1	(United States) Ashton Yates	Honda	12	Ret	14	13	14	Ret	15	11	9	6	13	10	11	7	9	8	10	8	10	10	386
2	(Brazil) Danilo Lewis	BMW	17	12	20	14	13	6	10	15	12	4	12	9	9	11	15	9	11	13	Ret	13	362
3	(United States) Nolan Lamkin	BMW	13	8	16	17	16	Ret	11	24	14	Ret	15	Ret	13	12	12	13	13	12	12	DNS	247
4	(United States) Bryce Prince	Yamaha			11	11	9			16	16	Ret	DNS	12	12						11	11	171
5	(United States) Alex Arango	BMW	Ret	14	22	Ret	22	11	14	18	19	DNS	DNS	17	17	14	16	14	14	14	DNS	DNS	161
6	(Republic of Ireland) Richard Kerr	Honda			15	12	11			14	15	5	Ret	15	15						14	9	131
7	(United States) Bobby Davies	Yamaha	Ret	15	26	20	20	14	17	22	DNS	Ret	21	20	19			15	Ret	16	17	19	120
8	(United States) Manuel Segura	Suzuki	DNS	16	24	19	Ret	Ret	16	23	21	Ret	Ret	21	20			17	17	17	18	20	103
9	(United States) Deion Campbell	Yamaha			18	Ret	12			17	18	Ret	14	13	Ret						13	14	101
10	(United States) Agustin Sierra	BMW			Ret	Ret	Ret	13	18	21	20	13	20	19	DNS			16	16	15	DNS	DNS	98
11	(United States) Joseph Giannotto	Kawasaki	16	17	16	18	19	DNS	DNS	DNS	DNS			18	18								67
12	(United States) Jason Waters	BMW	Ret	13	Ret	16	17			DNS	DNS							Ret	15	Ret	16	Ret	57
13	(United States) JC Camacho	Yamaha			23	Ret	DNS			20	DNS	DNS	19								Ret	DNS	25
14	(United States) Gabriel Da Silva	Honda						10	Ret														20
15	(United States) Justin Miest	Kawasaki								19	17												19
16	(United States) William Posse	Suzuki	18	19				DNS	DNS														19
17	(United States) John Knowles	Suzuki			25	Ret	DNS			Ret	DNS	14	DNS										15
18	(United States) Andrew Lee	BMW			Ret	15	Ret			DNS	DNS	DNS	DNS	Ret	DNS								11
19	(United States) Wyatt Farris	Yamaha			17	Ret	DNS			DNS	DNS												11
20	(United Kingdom) Steven Shakespeare	Ducati								DNS	DNS										DNS	DNS	0
21	(United States) Kory Pappas	Ducati								Ret	Ret												0
22	(United States) P. R. Stafki	Kawasaki								Ret	DNS												0
Pos	Rider	Bike	ATL (Georgia (U.S. state))		ALA (Alabama)			RAM (Wisconsin)		BRA (Minnesota)		RID (Washington (state))		MON (California)		OHI (Ohio)		TEX (Texas)			NJE (New Jersey)		Pts
