= 2026 Formula 4 United States Championship =

Motor racing competition

The 2026 Formula 4 United States Championship season was the eleventh and final season of the Formula 4 United States Championship, a motor racing series regulated according to FIA Formula 4 regulations and sanctioned by SCCA Pro Racing, the professional racing division of the Sports Car Club of America. The 2026 season was scheduled to be held over seven race weekends, starting in April and finishing in October.

== Teams and drivers ==
Team	No.	Driver	Class	Rounds
(United States) USNG Racing	10	(United States) Zain Khan	R	3
(United States) Kiwi Motorsport	15	(South Africa) Zach Fourie	R	1–6
(United States) Kiwi Motorsport	18	(United States) Ayden Kohut	R	All
(United States) Kiwi Motorsport	68	(Canada) Caleb Campbell		All
(United States) Kiwi Motorsport	17	(Chile) Clemente Huerta		4–7
(United States) Speed Factory	17	(Chile) Clemente Huerta		1–3
(United States) Crosslink Motorsports	16	(Mexico) Fernando Rivera	R	All
(United States) Crosslink Motorsports	34	(United States) Austin Kaszuba		3
(United States) Champagne Racing	27	(Uruguay) Gastón Irazú	R	All
(United States) RASE Motorsports	32	(United States) Ben Ramirez	R	2–3, 6
(United States) Team Roberts	46	(United States) Jeremiah Thomas	R	7
(United States) Momentum Motorsports	54	(Canada) Luca Day	R	1–6
(United States) MLT Motorsports	77	(Canada) Cole Medeiros	R	1, 3–6
(United States) VMax Motorsport	93	(Canada) Robert Soroka		1

Icon	Status
R	Rookie

== Calendar ==
The 2026 calendar was announced on 2 October 2025. The championship will visit the same seven locations as it did the year before.

Round		Circuit	Date	Supporting	Map of circuit locations
1	R1	(United States) NOLA Motorsports Park, Avondale	April 11	SVRA Sprint Series; Formula Regional Americas Championship; Ligier Junior Formula Championship	2026 Formula 4 United States Championship is located in the United States
1	R2	(United States) NOLA Motorsports Park, Avondale	April 12	SVRA Sprint Series; Formula Regional Americas Championship; Ligier Junior Formula Championship	2026 Formula 4 United States Championship is located in the United States
1	R3	(United States) NOLA Motorsports Park, Avondale	April 12	SVRA Sprint Series; Formula Regional Americas Championship; Ligier Junior Formula Championship	2026 Formula 4 United States Championship is located in the United States
2	R4	(United States) Road America, Elkhart Lake	May 16	SVRA Sprint Series; Formula Regional Americas Championship; Ligier Junior Formula Championship	2026 Formula 4 United States Championship is located in the United States
2	R5	(United States) Road America, Elkhart Lake	May 17	SVRA Sprint Series; Formula Regional Americas Championship; Ligier Junior Formula Championship	2026 Formula 4 United States Championship is located in the United States
2	R6	(United States) Road America, Elkhart Lake	May 17	SVRA Sprint Series; Formula Regional Americas Championship; Ligier Junior Formula Championship	2026 Formula 4 United States Championship is located in the United States
3	R7	(United States) Mid-Ohio Sports Car Course, Lexington	June 13	Formula Regional Americas Championship; Ligier Junior Formula Championship; Ginetta Challenge Race Series; Porsche GT3 Cup Trophy USA	2026 Formula 4 United States Championship is located in the United States
3	R8	(United States) Mid-Ohio Sports Car Course, Lexington	June 14	Formula Regional Americas Championship; Ligier Junior Formula Championship; Ginetta Challenge Race Series; Porsche GT3 Cup Trophy USA	2026 Formula 4 United States Championship is located in the United States
4	R9	(United States) New Jersey Motorsports Park, Millville	August 1	SVRA Sprint Series; Formula Regional Americas Championship; Ligier Junior Formula Championship	2026 Formula 4 United States Championship is located in the United States
4	R10	(United States) New Jersey Motorsports Park, Millville	August 2	SVRA Sprint Series; Formula Regional Americas Championship; Ligier Junior Formula Championship	2026 Formula 4 United States Championship is located in the United States
4	R11	(United States) New Jersey Motorsports Park, Millville	August 2	SVRA Sprint Series; Formula Regional Americas Championship; Ligier Junior Formula Championship	2026 Formula 4 United States Championship is located in the United States
5	R12	(Canada) Canadian Tire Motorsports Park, Bowmanville	September 5	Trans-Am-Series; Formula Regional Americas Championship; NASCAR Canada Series; Radical Cup Canada presented by Michelin	2026 Formula 4 United States Championship is located in the United States
5	R13	(Canada) Canadian Tire Motorsports Park, Bowmanville	September 5	Trans-Am-Series; Formula Regional Americas Championship; NASCAR Canada Series; Radical Cup Canada presented by Michelin	2026 Formula 4 United States Championship is located in the United States
5	R14	(Canada) Canadian Tire Motorsports Park, Bowmanville	September 6	Trans-Am-Series; Formula Regional Americas Championship; NASCAR Canada Series; Radical Cup Canada presented by Michelin	2026 Formula 4 United States Championship is located in the United States
6	R15	(United States) Virginia International Raceway, Alton	September 19	SVRA Sprint Series; Trans-Am-Series; Porsche GT3 Cup Trophy USA; Formula Regional Americas Championship; Ligier Junior Formula Championship	2026 Formula 4 United States Championship is located in the United States
6	R16	(United States) Virginia International Raceway, Alton	September 20	SVRA Sprint Series; Trans-Am-Series; Porsche GT3 Cup Trophy USA; Formula Regional Americas Championship; Ligier Junior Formula Championship	2026 Formula 4 United States Championship is located in the United States
7	R17	(United States) Barber Motorsports Park, Birmingham	October 17	SVRA Sprint Series; Ginetta Challenge Race Series; Formula Regional Americas Championship; Ligier Junior Formula Championship; Formula Race Promotions	2026 Formula 4 United States Championship is located in the United States
7	R18	(United States) Barber Motorsports Park, Birmingham	October 18	SVRA Sprint Series; Ginetta Challenge Race Series; Formula Regional Americas Championship; Ligier Junior Formula Championship; Formula Race Promotions	2026 Formula 4 United States Championship is located in the United States

== Race results ==
Round		Circuit	Pole position	Fastest lap	Winning driver	Winning team
1	R1	(United States) NOLA Motorsports Park	(Canada) Cole Medeiros	(Canada) Caleb Campbell	(Canada) Caleb Campbell	(United States) Kiwi Motorsport
1	R2	(United States) NOLA Motorsports Park		(Canada) Caleb Campbell	(Canada) Caleb Campbell	(United States) Kiwi Motorsport
1	R3	(United States) NOLA Motorsports Park		(Uruguay) Gastón Irazú	(Canada) Caleb Campbell	(United States) Kiwi Motorsport
2	R4	(United States) Road America	(Uruguay) Gastón Irazú	(Uruguay) Gastón Irazú	(Uruguay) Gastón Irazú	(United States) Champagne Racing
2	R5	(United States) Road America		(Uruguay) Gastón Irazú	(Uruguay) Gastón Irazú	(United States) Champagne Racing
2	R6	(United States) Road America		Race cancelled due to inclement weather		
7	R7	(United States) Mid-Ohio Sports Car Course	(Uruguay) Gastón Irazú	(Uruguay) Gastón Irazú	(Uruguay) Gastón Irazú	(United States) Champagne Racing
7	R8	(United States) Mid-Ohio Sports Car Course		(Canada) Caleb Campbell	(Canada) Caleb Campbell	(United States) Kiwi Motorsport
4	R9	(United States) New Jersey Motorsports Park	(Uruguay) Gastón Irazú	(Uruguay) Gastón Irazú	(Uruguay) Gastón Irazú	(United States) Champagne Racing
4	R10	(United States) New Jersey Motorsports Park		(Uruguay) Gastón Irazú	(Uruguay) Gastón Irazú	(United States) Champagne Racing
4	R11	(United States) New Jersey Motorsports Park		(Uruguay) Gastón Irazú	(Uruguay) Gastón Irazú	(United States) Champagne Racing
5	R12	(Canada) Canadian Tire Motorsports Park	(Uruguay) Gastón Irazú	(Canada) Cole Medeiros	(South Africa) Zach Fourie	(United States) Kiwi Motorsport
5	R13	(Canada) Canadian Tire Motorsports Park		(Uruguay) Gastón Irazú	(Canada) Cole Medeiros	(United States) MLT Motorsports
5	R14	(Canada) Canadian Tire Motorsports Park		(Uruguay) Gastón Irazú	(Uruguay) Gastón Irazú	(United States) Champagne Racing
6	R15	(United States) Virginia International Raceway	(Uruguay) Gastón Irazú	(Chile) Clemente Huerta	(Uruguay) Gastón Irazú	(United States) Champagne Racing
6	R16	(United States) Virginia International Raceway		(Uruguay) Gastón Irazú	(Uruguay) Gastón Irazú	(United States) Champagne Racing
7	R17	(United States) Barber Motorsports Park	(Canada) Caleb Campbell	(Chile) Clemente Huerta	(Chile) Clemente Huerta	(United States) Kiwi Motorsport
7	R18	(United States) Barber Motorsports Park		(Uruguay) Gastón Irazú	(Chile) Clemente Huerta	(United States) Kiwi Motorsport

== Championship standings ==
Points were awarded to the top ten classified finishers as follows:

Position	**1st**	**2nd**	**3rd**	**4th**	**5th**	**6th**	**7th**	**8th**	**9th**	**10th**
Points	25	18	15	12	10	8	6	4	2	1

=== Drivers' Championship ===
Pos	Driver	NOL (United States)			ROA (United States)			MOH (United States)		NJM (United States)			MOS (Canada)			VIR (United States)		BAR (United States)		Pts
Pos	Driver	R1	R2	R3	R4	R5	R6	R7	R8	R9	R10	R11	R12	R13	R14	R15	R16	R17	R18	Pts
1	(Uruguay) Gastón Irazú	3	Ret	3	**1**	1	C	**1**	2	**1**	1	1	**2**	2	1	**1**	1	2	4	339
2	(Canada) Caleb Campbell	1	1	1	2	3	C	2	1	Ret	8	7	6	8	4	8†	2	**5**	3	232
3	(South Africa) Zach Fourie	2	2	2	3	2	C	4	3	2	3	Ret	1	7	3	2	4			223
4	(Chile) Clemente Huerta	5	Ret	7	5	5	C	5	6	3	4	3	4	6	5	3	3	1	1	206
5	(Canada) Cole Medeiros	**4**	3	4				3	9	5	2	2	3	1	2	7	Ret			166
6	(Mexico) Fernando Rivera	Ret	4	8	8†	7	C	Ret	5	4	7	4	Ret	3	Ret	6	6	4	2	127
7	(United States) Ayden Kohut	Ret	6	9	6	8	C	7	4	7	6	6	Ret	4	6	4	5	3	Ret	119
8	(Canada) Luca Day	Ret	Ret	6	4	4	C	8	7	6	5	5	5	5	7	Ret	8			100
9	(United States) Ben Ramirez				7	6	C	9	Ret							5	7			32
10	(Canada) Robert Soroka	6	5	5																28
11	(United States) Jeremiah Thomas																	6	5	18
12	(United States) Austin Kaszuba							6	Ret											8
13	(United States) Zain Khan							10	8											5
Pos	Driver	NOL (United States)			ROA (United States)			MOH (United States)		NJM (United States)			MOS (Canada)			VIR (United States)		BAR (United States)		Pts

Colour	Result
Gold	Winner
Silver	Second place
Bronze	Third place
Green	Points classification
Blue	Non-points classification
Blue	Non-classified finish (NC)
Purple	Retired, not classified (Ret)
Red	Did not qualify (DNQ)
Red	Did not pre-qualify (DNPQ)
Black	Disqualified (DSQ)
White	Did not start (DNS)
White	Withdrew (WD)
White	Race cancelled (C)
Blank	Did not practice (DNP)
Blank	Did not arrive (DNA)
Blank	Excluded (EX)

**Bold** – Pole
Italics – Fastest Lap

=== Teams' Championship ===
Each team acquired the points earned by their two highest finishing drivers in each race.

Pos	Team	NOL (United States)			ROA (United States)			MOH (United States)		NJM (United States)			MOS (Canada)			VIR (United States)		BAR (United States)		Pts
Pos	Team	R1	R2	R3	R4	R5	R6	R7	R8	R9	R10	R11	R12	R13	R14	R15	R16	R17	R18	Pts
1	(United States) Kiwi Motorsport	1	1	1	2	2	C	2	1	2	3	3	1	4	3	2	2	1	1	578
1	(United States) Kiwi Motorsport	2	2	2	3	3	C	4	3	3	4	6	4	6	4	3	3	3	3	578
2	(United States) Champagne Racing	3	Ret	3	1	1	C	1	2	1	1	1	2	2	1	1	1	2	4	339
3	(United States) MLT Motorsports	4	3	4				3	9	5	2	2	3	1	2	7	Ret			166
4	(United States) Crosslink Motorsports	Ret	4	8	8†	7	C	6	5	4	7	4	Ret	3	Ret	6	6	4	2	135
4	(United States) Crosslink Motorsports							Ret	Ret											135
5	(United States) Momentum Motorsports	Ret	Ret	6	4	4	C	8	7	6	5	5	5	5	7	Ret	8			100
6	(United States) Speed Factory	5	Ret	7	5	5	C	5	6											54
7	(United States) RASE Motorsports				7	6	C	9	Ret							5	7			32
8	(United States) VMax Motorsport	6	5	5																28
9	(United States) Team Roberts																	6	5	18
10	(United States) USNG Racing							10	8											5
Pos	Team	NOL (United States)			ROA (United States)			MOH (United States)		NJM (United States)			MOS (Canada)			VIR (United States)		BAR (United States)		Pts
