= 2022 MotoAmerica Supersport Championship =

Record of 2022 Racing Season

The 2022 MotoAmerica Supersport Championship season was the 8th season of the MotoAmerica Supersport class. The defending class champion was Sean Dylan Kelly, who vacated his title during 2022 to race internationally in Moto2.

== Impact of Next-Generation Supersport Regulations ==
The 2022 Supersport season was noteworthy for the adoption of the FIM's Next-Generation Supersport rules. Prior to the introduction of the Next-Generation concept, Supersport grids consisted mainly of 600cc four-cylinder motorcycles produced by the Japanese manufacturing companies, Yamaha, Kawasaki, Honda and Suzuki. To encourage participation by a wider range of motorcycle manufacturers, the FIM devised a new formula to balance the performance of larger-displacement motorcycles with the existing quartet of 600cc supersport motorcycles.

In response to MotoAmerica's adoption of Next-Generation Supersport regulations, WarHorse HSBK Racing NYC partnered with Ducati to form a single-rider team to campaign the Ducati Panigale V2 in MotorAmerica Supersport. On November 12, 2021 the team announced that former-MotoAmerica-Superbike champion, Josh Herrin, had signed with the team to race the 2022 Daytona 200 and the 2022 MotoAmerica Supersport season. Herrin would go on to win 9 of 18 races during the 2022 season, taking the championship by a 106pt margin.

Though Sean Dylan Kelly had taken the 2021 Supersport championship aboard a Suzuki GSX-R600, MotoAmerica received Supersport entries from teams who intended to compete under Next-Gen rules with the Suzuki GSX-R750. California-based Team Hammer prepared the GSX-R750 for its return to competition, which led the team to form a technical partnership with UK-based Bike Sports Development to retro-fit the GSX-R750 with a compulsory throttle-by-wire racing kit. During 2022, Team Hammer's throttle conversion kit was the only homologated throttle upgrade for Next-Generation Supersport competition, signifying that MotoAmerica Supersport was the global development laboratory in 2022 for the GSX-R750. In February 2022, Team Hammer announced it would retain Sam Lochoff and add Liam Grant to their Supersport rider lineup. In April 2022, the team also added the 2021 Junior Cup champion, Tyler Scott, to their roster just before the first event at Road Atlanta. Team Hammer scored four consecutive podiums in the first four races of the 2022 season. Their success prompted other teams to adopt Suzuki's 750cc platform. Altus Motorsports switched from the GSX-R600 to the GSX-R750 for Round 2 at Virginia International Raceway and 3D Motorsports LLC followed at Road America.

== The Return of Josh Hayes ==
The 2022 Supersport season also marked the return of four-time AMA Pro Superbike champion, Josh Hayes, who planned to participate at select events with the Squid Hunter racing team aboard a Yamaha R6. Hayes entered the 2022 MotoAmerica season just 3 wins shy of Miguel Duhamel's record for career wins in AMA Pro Roadracing competition. After narrowly missing victory at the 2022 Daytona 200, Hayes scored his first victory of the 2022 season during Race 1 at Virginia International Raceway. After a 3-event break, Hayes was asked to sub for Kevin Olmedo, who could not compete with the N2 Racing Bobblehead Moto Team due to illness. The partnership with N2 Racing did not produce additional victories for Hayes, but when he reunited with the Squid Hunter racing team at New Jersey Motorsports Park, the 47-year-old scored his 85th and 86th career victories to tie Duhamel's record. With one event remaining in 2022, Hayes hoped to break Duhamel's record at Barber Motorsports Park, but he suffered a high-speed crash during free practice. The crash broke Hayes' leg, and he was forced to end the 2022 season as the co-record-holder for career wins in Ama Pro Roadracing competition.

== Calendar and results ==
Round	Circuit	Date	Race 1 Winner	Race 2 Winner
	(Florida) Daytona International Speedway	March 10–12	Non-championship event	Non-championship event
1	(Georgia (U.S. state)) Road Atlanta	April 22–24	(United States) Josh Herrin	(United States) Josh Herrin
2	Virginia	May 20–22	(United States) Josh Hayes	(United States) Josh Herrin
3	(Wisconsin) Road America	June 3–5	(United States) Tyler Scott	(United States) Jason Farrell
4	(Washington (state)) The Ridge	June 24–26	(United States) Josh Herrin	(United States) Josh Herrin
5	(California) Monterey	July 8–10	(United States) Josh Herrin	(United States) Josh Herrin
6	(Minnesota) Brainerd	July 29–31	(United States) Rocco Landers	(United States) Rocco Landers
7	(Pennsylvania) Pittsburgh	August 19–21	(United States) Rocco Landers	(United States) Josh Herrin
8	New Jersey	September 9–11	(United States) Josh Hayes	(United States) Josh Hayes
9	Alabama	September 23–25	(United States) Rocco Landers	(United States) Josh Herrin

== Teams and riders ==
2022 Entry List
Team	Constructor	No.	Rider	Rounds
Warhorse HSBK Racing Ducati NYC	Ducati	2	(United States) Josh Herrin	All
Squid Hunter	Yamaha	4	(United States) Josh Hayes	2,8-9
Blackall Racing LLC	Yamaha	11	(United States) Tony Blackall	1,3,7
Blackall Racing LLC	Yamaha	73	(United States) Neal Scalf	3,7
Star Race Team	Kawasaki	12	(United States) Jamie Starace	9
Team Velocity Racing	Yamaha	13	(United States) Chuck Ivey	1,3,7
BobbleHeadMoto / N2 Racing	Yamaha	16	(El Salvador) Kevin Olmedo	1-5
BobbleHeadMoto / N2 Racing	Yamaha	4	(United States) Josh Hayes	6-7
BobbleHeadMoto / N2 Racing	Yamaha	99	(El Salvador) Emerson Amaya	9
Tango Racing	Kawasaki	17	(Argentina) Roberto Hernan Medina	1
Nitido Racing	Yamaha	18	(United States) Christian Miranda	9
North East Cycle Outlet	Yamaha	20	(United States) CJ LaRoche	All
North East Cycle Outlet	Yamaha	88	(United States) Benjamin Smith	All
Mi Scusi Racing Team	Yamaha	22	(United States) Sloan West	2
Mi Scusi Racing Team	Yamaha	91	(United States) Thomas McQuigg	2
Vision Wheel M4 ECSTAR Suzuki	Suzuki	24	(United States) Cory Ventura	5-7
Vision Wheel M4 ECSTAR Suzuki	Suzuki	44	(South Africa) Samuel Lochoff	1-4,8,9
Vision Wheel M4 ECSTAR Suzuki	Suzuki	70	(United States) Tyler Scott	All
Vision Wheel M4 ECSTAR Suzuki	Suzuki	90	(United States) Liam Grant	All
Disrupt Racing	Suzuki	25	(United States) Dominic Doyle	6-9
Disrupt Racing	Suzuki	60	(United States) Carl Soltisz	All
EZ Racing	Yamaha	27	(Mexico) Edgar Zaragoza	All
EZ Racing	Yamaha	89	(Mexico) Ivan Munoz	5
DMK Racing	Kawasaki	29	(United States) David Kohlstaedt	4-5
Catalyst Reaction Racing	Yamaha	30	(United States) Michael Kim	5
MP13 Racing	Yamaha	33	(United States) Chad Lewin	1-3,5
PDR Motorsports	Yamaha	35	(Spain) Diego Perez	1–3,5
Mallory Dobbs Racing	Kawasaki	36	(United States) Mallory Dobbs	4-5
Mesa37 Racing	Kawasaki	37	(United States) Stefano Mesa	3
Team Schwags	Yamaha	38	(United States) Jonathan Schweiger	1,3
Hopkins Racing	Yamaha	39	(United States) Sean Hopkins	9
Mosites Motorsports	Kawasaki	43	(United States) Gary Yancoskie	7
All Hustle Racing	Yamaha	46	(United States) Nick Patenaude	1
Duo Rotae Racing	Yamaha	47	(United States) Harm Jansen	5
Turn One Racing	Yamaha	49	(United States) Blake Holt	3,9
Allegro Racing	Suzuki	52	(United States) Douglas Jacobsen	9
Dirty T Race Team	Suzuki	54	(United States) Jordan Tropkoff	3,5,7
Wawa Racing Team	Kawasaki	55	(Israel) Sahar Svik	5
Wawa Racing Team	Kawasaki	56	(Israel) Orel Madar	5
LFrey Racing	Yamaha	58	(United States) Timothy Frey	9
Altus Motorsports	Suzuki	59	(United States) Jaret Nassaney	All
Altus Motorsports	Suzuki	75	(United States) Justin Jones	1-4
Miller Racing	Kawasaki	61	(United States) Austin Miller	2
Seethaler Racing	Yamaha	62	(United States) Nathan Seethaler	7
Max Angles Racing Team	Kawasaki	64	(United States) Max Angles	1
Rosso Racing	Yamaha	65	(Mexico) Aldo Rovirosa	5
Coleman Racing	Kawasaki	66	(United States) Patrick Coleman	1,5
3D Motorsports LLC	Suzuki	68	(Australia) Luke Power	All
HONOS Racing	Yamaha	71	(Mexico) Jorge Ehrenstein	5
Hot Sauce	Kawasaki	74	(United States) Chris Sarbora	1,4,5,7-9
Burdett Racing	Yamaha	77	(United States) Matt Burdett	1
Thermiotis Racing	Yamaha	78	(Venezuela) Alejandro Thermiotis	1
Farrell Performance	Kawasaki	85	(United States) Jason Farrell	3
Reded Racing Team	Yamaha	86	(Brazil) Rodrigo Donde	3
129Photos.com Racing Team	Kawasaki	87	(United States) Kevin Netto	9
Open Source Racing	Yamaha	92	(United States) Joel Ohman	4-5
Landers Racing	Yamaha	97	(United States) Rocco Landers	All

== Championship standings ==
Scoring system

Points are awarded to the top fifteen finishers. A rider has to finish the race to earn points.

Position	1st	2nd	3rd	4th	5th	6th	7th	8th	9th	10th	11th	12th	13th	14th	15th
Points	25	20	16	13	11	10	9	8	7	6	5	4	3	2	1

Pos	Rider	Bike	RAT (Georgia (U.S. state))		VIR (Virginia)		RAM (Wisconsin)		RID (Washington (state))		MON (California)		BRA (Minnesota)		PIT (Pennsylvania)		NJE (New Jersey)		ALA (Alabama)		Pts
Pos	Rider	Bike	R1	R2	R1	R2	R1	R2	R1	R2	R1	R2	R1	R2	R1	R2	R1	R2	R1	R2	Pts
1	(United States) Josh Herrin	Ducati	1	1	4	1	2	3	1	1	1	1	2	2	2	1	2	4	2	1	387
2	(United States) Rocco Landers	Yamaha	4	3	3	5	3	15	2	4	3	3	1	1	1	2	3	16	1	9	281
3	(United States) Tyler Scott	Suzuki	DNS	5	2	3	1	Ret	5	2	2	2	4	12	3	3	Ret	6	5	3	229
4	(United States) Benjamin Smith	Yamaha	3	Ret	9	7	15	4	6	11	5	10	6	5	4	5	5	3	4	6	173
5	(Australia) Luke Power	Suzuki	8	7	6	Ret	4	2	Ret	5	6	Ret	7	8	10	7	8	8	Ret	2	149
6	(United States) Josh Hayes	Yamaha			1	2							3	3	5	6	1	1			148
7	(United States) Jaret Nassaney	Suzuki	11	8	5	Ret	9	7	7	10	7	Ret	8	9	9	9	6	5	6	4	137
8	(El Salvador) Kevin Olmedo	Yamaha	6	4	8	6	6	8	4	3	4	4									114
9	(South Africa) Samuel Lochoff	Suzuki	2	2	12	4	7	Ret	3	15							7	12	Ret	5	107
10	(United States) Stefano Mesa	Kawasaki					5	5							7	4	4	2	3	7	102
11	(United States) Carl Soltisz	Suzuki	13	11	18	Ret	8	9	10	7	9	9	9	7	12	12	10	9	11	12	98
12	(United States) CJ LaRoche	Yamaha	12	10	13	9	11	11	12	9	10	8	11	11	11	11	9	11	Ret	8	95
13	(United States) Liam Grant	Suzuki	14	12	10	Ret	10	16	9	6	DNS		10	10	13	13	11	10	8	16	72
14	(United States) Cory Ventura	Suzuki									8	5	5	4	6	8					61
15	(United States) Dominic Doyle	Suzuki											Ret	6	8	10	Ret	7	7	11	47
16	(Venezuela) Alejandro Thermiotis	Yamaha	10	9	14	8	Ret	12	8	Ret	DNS	6									45
17	(Mexico) Edgar Zaragoza	Yamaha	20	14	16	11	19	18	15	14	13	12	12	Ret	15	14	13	14	12	15	34
18	(Spain) Diego Perez	Yamaha	5	DNS	7	Ret	Ret	6			17	14									32
19	(United States) Jason Farrell	Kawasaki					13	1													28
20	(United States) David Kohlstaedt	Kawasaki							11	8	11	7									27
21	(United States) Justin Jones	Suzuki	15	13	19	10	14	10													18
22	(United States) Max Angles	Kawasaki	9	6																	17
23	(United States) Blake Holt	Yamaha					12	Ret											10	Ret	10
24	(United States) Christian Miranda	Yamaha																	9	13	10
25	(United States) Chad Lewin	Yamaha	7	Ret	17	DNS	Ret	Ret			Ret	DNS									9
26	(United States) Sean Hopkins	Yamaha																	13	10	9
27	(United States) Emerson Amaya	Yamaha															12	13	Ret	Ret	7
28	(United States) Jordan Tropkoff	Suzuki					21	14			12	19			Ret	Ret					6
29	(United States) Joel Ohman	Yamaha							14	12	Ret	18									6
30	(United States) Mallory Dobbs	Kawasaki							13	13	21	21									6
31	(United States) Sloan West	Yamaha			11	Ret															5
32	(Mexico) Aldo Rovirosa	Yamaha									20	11									5
33	(Brazil) Rodrigo Donde	Yamaha			Ret	13											14	17			5
34	(United States) Neal Scalf	Yamaha					16	13							Ret	15					4
35	(United States) Nathan Seethaler	Yamaha			20	12									19	20					4
36	(United States) Chris Sarbora	Kawasaki	18	15					DNS	DNS	16	16			16	18	15	15	DNS	Ret	3
37	(Mexico) Jorge Ehrenstein	Yamaha					18	Ret			18	13									3
38	(United States) Kevin Netto	Kawasaki																	15	14	3
39	(United States) Douglas Jacobsen	Suzuki																	14	17	2
40	(United States) Gary Yancoskie	Kawasaki													14	17					2
41	(Israel) Sahar Zvik	Kawasaki									14	20									2
42	(United States) Patrick Coleman	Kawasaki	16	17							15	DNS									1
43	(United States) Austin Miller	Kawasaki			15	Ret															1
44	(United States) Harm Jansen	Yamaha									Ret	15									1
45	(Israel) Orel Madar	Kawasaki									DNS	Ret									0
46	(United States) Jonathan Schweiger	Yamaha	22	20			17	Ret													0
47	(United States) Thomas McQuigg	Yamaha			Ret	Ret															0
48	(Argentina) Roberto Hernan Medina	Kawasaki	DNS	Ret																	0
49	(United States) Tony Blackall	Yamaha	Ret	Ret			20	17							18	16					0
50	(United States) Chuck Ivey	Yamaha	17	16																	0
51	(Mexico) Ivan Munoz	Yamaha									19	17									0
52	(United States) Timothy Frey	Yamaha																	16	18	0
53	(United States) Nick Patenaude	Yamaha	19	18																	0
54	(United States) Jamie Starace	Kawasaki																	Ret	19	0
55	(United States) Chris Murphy	Yamaha													17	19					0
56	(United States) Matt Burdett	Yamaha	21	19																	0
57	(United States) Michael Kim	Yamaha									Ret	22									0
Pos	Rider	Bike	RAT (Georgia (U.S. state))		VIR (Virginia)		RAM (Wisconsin)		RID (Washington (state))		MON (California)		BRA (Minnesota)		PIT (Pennsylvania)		NJE (New Jersey)		ALA (Alabama)		Pts
