= Mid-Ohio Sports Car Course =

Motorsport racetrack in Ohio, United States

- Mid-Ohio Sports Car Course Layout Second Road Course (1990–present)
- Location: Troy Township, Morrow County, at 7721 Steam Corners Road, Lexington, Ohio, United States
- Coordinates: 40.69°N 82.636°W
- Capacity: Bleachers: 12,000; Open seating: 75,000
- FIA Grade: 2
- Owner: Green Savoree Racing Promotions (March 2011–present)
- Operator: Green Savoree Racing Promotions (March 2011–present)
- Opened: 1962; 64 years ago
- Major events: Current: IndyCar Series; Indy 200 at Mid-Ohio (2007–present); MotoAmerica (1983–2014, 2024–present); Future: Trans-Am Series (1967–1972, 1982–1983, 1985–1994, 1997–1999, 2001–2002, 2009, 2012–2025, 2027); Former: [[[TCR World Tour]] (2024); IMSA SportsCar Championship; Sports Car Challenge at Mid-Ohio (1963–1968, 1972–1979, 1981–1993, 2001–2002, 2004–2012, 2018–2022); NASCAR Xfinity Series; B&L Transport 170 (2013–2019, 2021); NASCAR Craftsman Truck Series; O'Reilly Auto Parts 150 at Mid-Ohio (2022–2023); ARCA Menards Series; Zinsser SmartCoat 150 (1965, 2021–2024); Pirelli World Challenge (1994, 1997–1999, 2002–2017); SCCA Runoffs (1994–2005, 2016); Grand-Am Rolex Sports Car Series (2000–2001, 2003–2013); CART; Champ Car Grand Prix of Mid-Ohio (1980, 1983–2003)
- Website: http://www.midohio.com/

Second Road Course (1990–present)
- Length: 2.258 mi (3.634 km)
- Turns: 13
- Race lap record: 1:05.2600 ( (Australia) Will Power, Dallara DW12, 2016, IndyCar)

Original Road Course (1963–present)
- Length: 2.400 mi (3.862 km)
- Turns: 15
- Race lap record: 1:19.984 ( (Colombia) Roberto Guerrero, March 87C, 1987, CART)

Mid-Ohio Sports Car Course is a motorsport road course located in Troy Township, Morrow County, Ohio, United States, just outside the village of Lexington. Between Columbus and Cleveland, it hosts a number of racing series such as IndyCar, IMSA WeatherTech Sportscar Championship, NASCAR Craftsman Truck Series, MotoAmerica, and other club events such has SCCA, WERA, and National Auto Sport Association.

The Mid-Ohio course has 15 turns over its 2.400 mi (3.862 km) length, and is known to favor drivers with technical expertise, finesse, and plenty of patience. The features of the track include rolling terrain and elevation changes.

Its grandstand seats 12,000 and three observation mounds alongside the track raise the capacity to over 75,000. Mid-Ohio is classified as an FIA Grade Two circuit.

== The track ==
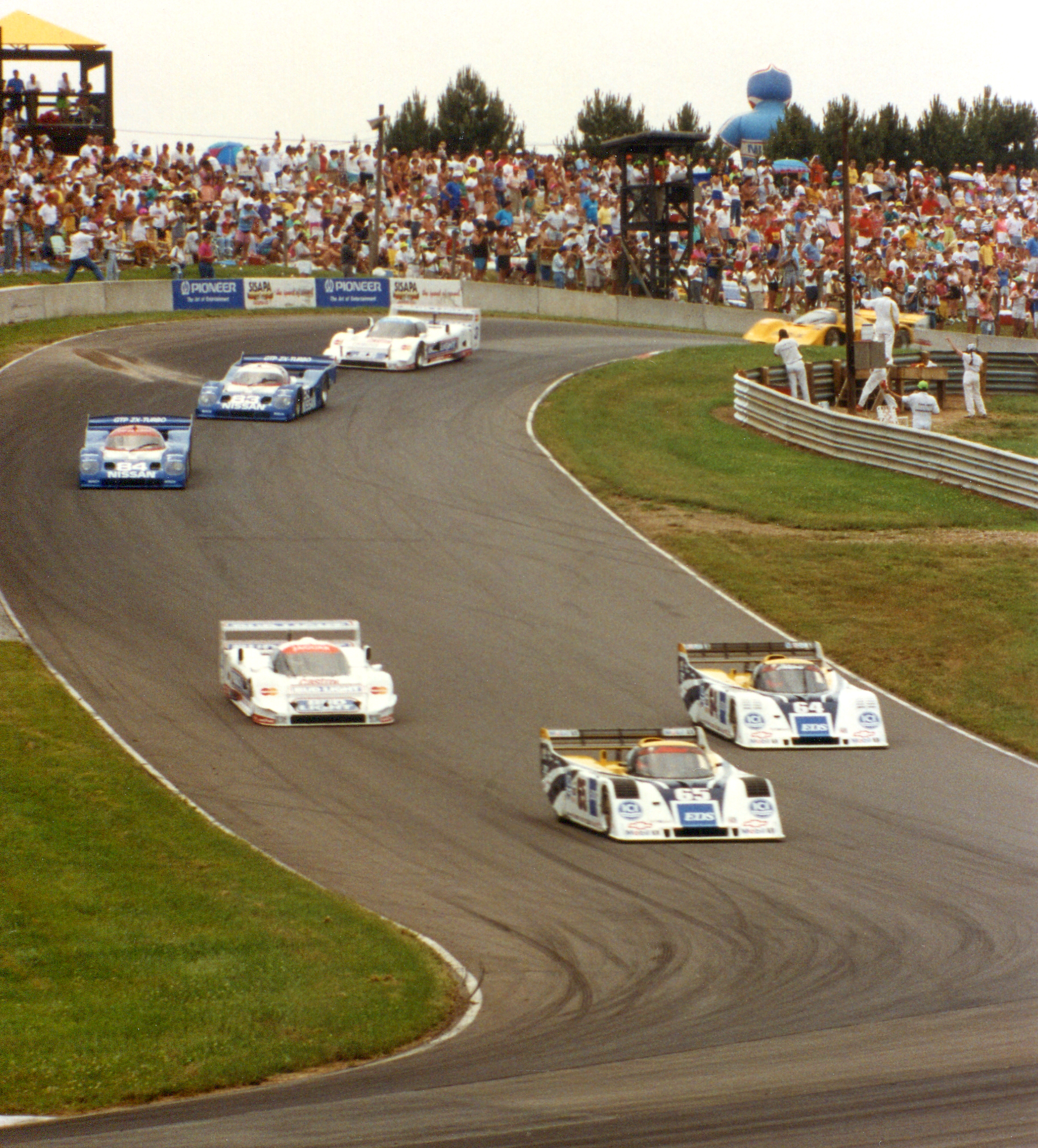
IMSA GTP cars compete at Mid-Ohio in 1991

The track opened in 1962 as a 16-turn road course run clockwise. After only one year, the "Oak Tree Bend" series of turns (in the northeast corner) was removed due to being too slow. It was replaced by the "Thunder Valley" downhill straight, which remains to the present day.

The current 15-turn, 2.400 mi (3.862 km) layout debuted in 1963. The back portion of the track allows speeds approaching 200 mph (320 km/h). A separate starting line and flagstand is situated on the backstretch to allow for safer and more competitive rolling starts. The regular start/finish line is located on the pit straight.

In 1990, the track underwent a refurbishment: a new retaining wall was built, the entire track was resurfaced, widened, and concrete was paved in the apexes of the turns to prevent asphalt deterioration. In addition, a straightaway segment was paved through the chicane, allowing for two different track layouts, the original 2.400 mi (3.862 km) circuit and a new 13-turn, 2.258 mi (3.634 km) circuit which bypasses the chicane. Major series including CART/Champ Car, IndyCar, IMSA, and NASCAR have mostly elected to bypass the chicane, while motorcycles and amateur/club racing typically use the 2.400 mi (3.862 km) layout (with the chicane).

In 2006, another major refurbishment saw several improvements. The entire circuit was repaved and the concrete patches in the turn apexes were removed. A new motorcycle "short course" was created by connecting turn one with the backstretch and another motorcycle/autocross oval was created by connecting the chicane straight with the backstretch. The additional layouts allow simultaneous use of the multiple courses for instructional and competitive uses. The improvements also included a motocross facility, that has since been used for the AMA Vintage Motorcycle days event. These changes resulted in a faster, safer, more competitive and attractive facility for drivers, riders and race fans.

In 2019, the ARX came to the track which was the first time rallycross had come to the circuit. The course was a 10-turn, 0.7 mi (1.1 km) lap and utilized the keyhole section of the track.

At the conclusion of the 2023 season, the track was once again fully repaved after utilizing a test section in turn one.

In 2024, Turn 4 was refurbished. Its original 4-degree banking was reduced to 2 degrees, its runoff area, known as “China Beach,” was regraded to the same level as the track. Additionally, new access roads were added near the runoff to better accommodate maintenance and safety vehicles. Catch basins were installed in the turn to facilitate drainage.

== History ==
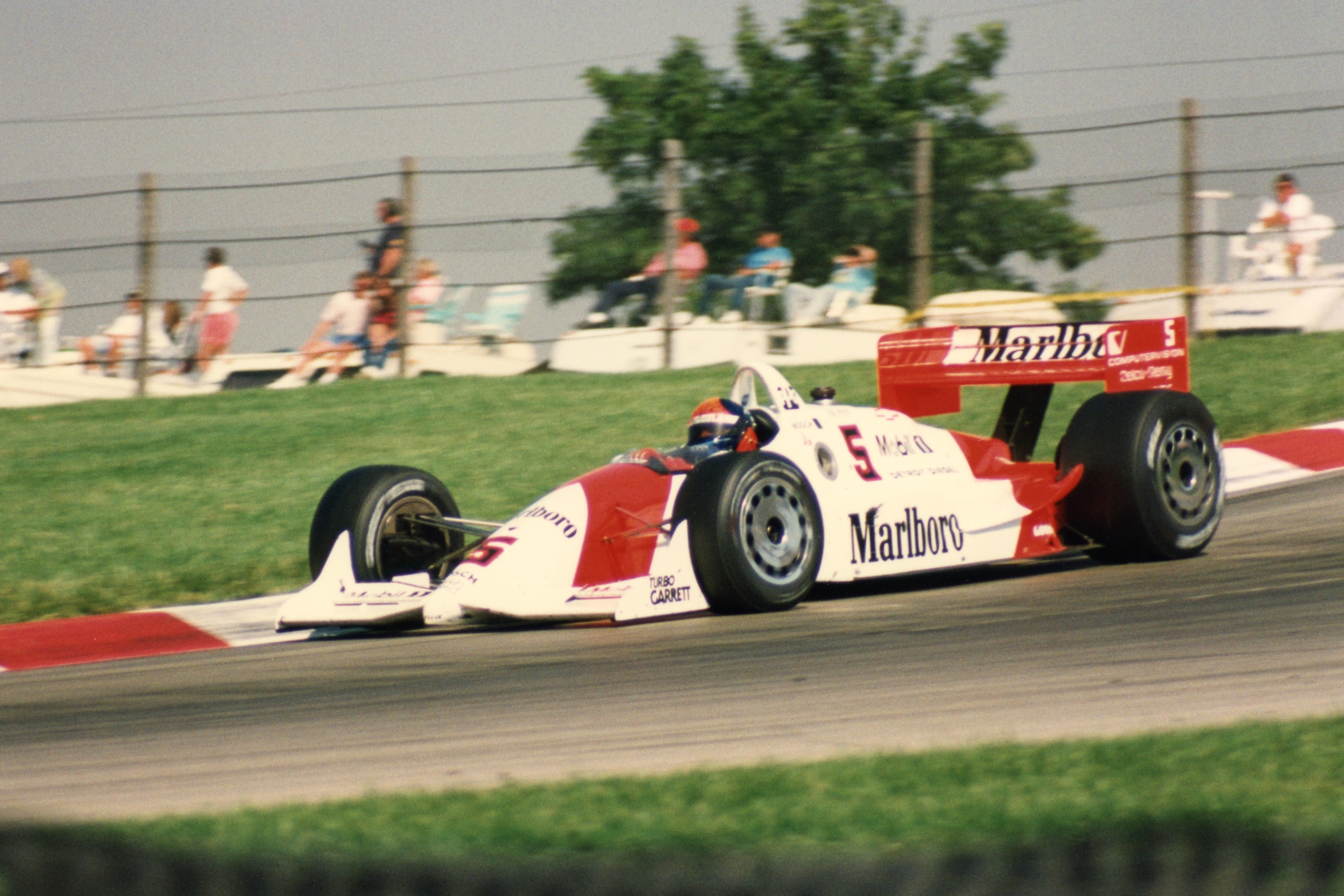
Emerson Fittipaldi navigates the Keyhole section of the course in a Penske Racing IndyCar in 1992

The track was opened in 1962 by Les Griebling and several Mansfield-area businessmen as a location for weekend sports car racing. The track hosted Can-am and F5000 through the 1970s and its first CART race was in 1980, with Johnny Rutherford taking victory with Chaparral.

In 1982, Mid-Ohio was purchased by Jim Trueman, a renowned road racer and the founder of Red Roof Inns. Trueman added permanent grandstands, amphitheater-style seating, garages with spectator balconies, a five-story media and hospitality center, tunnels and an updated paddock area. In addition, a tall, three-sided scoreboard tower was constructed in the infield, strategically placed such that it was visible from nearly all spectator areas around the track.

In 1986, Trueman passed away from cancer, with his wife and daughter taking over the management of the facility. In 1989, Truman's daughter Michelle, was named the president of the circuit and oversaw the day-to-day operations of the track.

On March 2, 2011, it was announced that the track had been purchased from Truesports by Green Savoree Racing Promotions, which also promotes other IndyCar races, ending Truesports' 29 years of ownership.

=== Race history ===
The course first hosted SportsCar racing in 1963 as part of the United States Road Racing Championship. The race was 168 mi (270 km) and was won by Ken Miles. The race would be held until the race series was folded in 1968, but the race would return as a 6-hour enduro under the IMSA GT championship in 1972. The track would also hold the U.S. Formula 5000 series from 1970 to 1976 and was replaced by the revived Can-Am series in 1977–1980.

The track continued to host IMSA GT until 1993, then the Grand-Am Rolex Sports Car Series in 2000. The track also added the American Le Mans series the next year. The track continued to host the two series until 2012 when ALMS dropped the race and Grand-Am followed suit the next year. In 2018, track hosted the IMSA WeatherTech SportsCar championship.

Mid-Ohio hosted its first CART race in 1980 as a 156-mile (251 km), 65-lap race. After a brief hiatus, the race returned in 1983 and was extended to a 200-mile (322 km) race. CART appeared annually until 2003, when CART president Chris Pook hinted at dropping Mid-Ohio from the CART schedule going forward, citing various issues.

For many years, Mid-Ohio was on the schedule alongside the Grand Prix of Cleveland, and Pook stated it was not viable to have two races in such close proximity, and favored keeping the race at Cleveland instead. In addition, some observers felt that the powerful Champ Cars had "outgrown" the narrow, winding course, citing a lack of passing and competition over the previous years.

The race would return in 2007 under the Indy Racing league and would partner as a doubleheader with the American Le Mans Series until 2012 when ALMS dropped the circuit from the calendar. The race has also featured support series such as the Road to Indy, Mazda MX-5 Cup, and Stadium Super Trucks. In 2015, hometown favorite Graham Rahal won at Mid-Ohio for the first time, thirty years after his father, Bobby Rahal, won his first race at the track. Scott Dixon has the most wins at the track with seven.

In 2013, the track hosted its first NASCAR event as a 200-mile (322 km) race with the NASCAR Xfinity Series. The length of the race was shortened to 170 miles (274 km) in 2018. The race has partnered with Trans-Am, Stadium Super Trucks, F4 United States Championship and partnered ARCA in 2020. Unlike most of the events held at the track, the Xfinity Series uses the normal start/finish line located on the pit straight to start the races, instead of the start line on the back straight. NASCAR realigned the race in 2022, moving it to the NASCAR Craftsman Truck Series.

== Events ==
Current

- April: Atlantic Championship, F2000 Championship Series, F1600 Championship Series, 24 Hours of Lemons
- May: SCCA Super Tour Great Lakes Race of Champions
- June: Michelin Pilot Challenge O’Reilly Auto Parts Four Hours of Mid-Ohio, Trans-Am Series Mid-Ohio SpeedTour, IMSA VP Racing SportsCar Challenge, Mazda MX-5 Cup, Mustang Challenge North America, Formula Regional Americas Championship, F4 United States Championship, Sportscar Vintage Racing Association
- July: IndyCar Series Indy 200 at Mid-Ohio, Indy NXT, USF Pro 2000 Championship, USF2000 Championship, USF Juniors, AMA Vintage Motorcycle Days
- August: MotoAmerica MotoAmerica Superbikes at Mid-Ohio
- September: ChampCar Endurance Series

Future

- Trans-Am Series (1967–1972, 1982–1983, 1985–1994, 1997–1999, 2001–2002, 2009, 2012–2025, 2027)

Former

- AMA Superbike Championship
  - Honda Super Cycle Weekend presented by Dunlop Tire (1983–2014)
- American Le Mans Series
  - Mid-Ohio Sports Car Challenge (2001–2002, 2004–2012)
- Americas Rallycross Championship (2019)
- ARCA Menards Series
  - Zinsser SmartCoat 150 (1965, 2021–2024)
- Barber Pro Series (1987–1990, 1992–2003)
- Can-Am (1969–1974, 1977–1982)
- CART
  - Champ Car Grand Prix of Mid-Ohio (1980, 1983–2003)
- Formula BMW Americas (2005–2006, 2008)
- Grand American Road Racing Association Rolex Sports Car Series
  - EMCO Gears Classic presented by KeyBank (2000–2001, 2003–2013)
- IMSA GT Championship (1972–1979, 1981–1993)
- IMSA GT3 Cup Challenge (2005–2008, 2010, 2018–2020)
- IMSA SportsCar Championship
  - Sports Car Challenge at Mid-Ohio (2018–2022)
- International Race of Champions (1985–1987)
- Lamborghini Super Trofeo North America (2013, 2018)
- NASCAR Craftsman Truck Series
- O'Reilly Auto Parts 150 at Mid-Ohio (2022–2023)
- NASCAR Xfinity Series
  - B&L Transport 170 (2013–2019, 2021)
- North American Touring Car Championship (1996–1997)
- Pirelli World Challenge (1994, 1997–1999, 2002–2017)
- Porsche Sprint Challenge North America (2022–2023)
- SCCA National Championship Runoffs (1994–2005, 2016)
- SCCA/USAC Formula 5000 Championship (1970–1976)
- Stadium Super Trucks (2019, 2021–2022)
- TCR World Tour (2024)
- United States Road Racing Championship
  - U.S. Road Racing Classic (1963–1968, 1998–1999)

== Lap records ==
The unofficial lap record is 1:03.8700, set by Simon Pagenaud during the qualifying of the 2016 Honda Indy 200. As of August 2026, the fastest official race lap records on the Mid-Ohio Sports Car Course are listed as:

Category	Time	Driver	Vehicle	Event
Second Road Course (without Chicane before The Keyhole) (1990–present): 2.258 mi (3.634 km)
IndyCar	1:05.2600	Will Power	Dallara DW12	2016 Honda Indy 200
CART	1:06.788	Juan Pablo Montoya	Reynard 99I	1999 Miller Lite 200
LMP1	1:10.034	Marco Werner	Audi R10 TDI	2008 Sports Car Challenge of Mid-Ohio
LMP2	1:10.113	Romain Dumas	Porsche RS Spyder Evo	2007 Sports Car Challenge of Mid-Ohio
Indy NXT	1:10.4168	Caio Collet	Dallara IL-15	2025 Indy NXT by Firestone Grand Prix at Mid-Ohio
IMSA GTP	1:11.708	P. J. Jones	Eagle MkIII	1993 Nissan Grand Prix of Ohio
DPi	1:12.188	Kevin Magnussen	Cadillac DPi-V.R	2021 Sports Car Challenge at Mid-Ohio
Formula Atlantic	1:13.812	Jonathan Summerton	Swift 016.a	2009 Acura Sports Car Challenge at Mid-Ohio
LMP900	1:14.784	Tom Kristensen	Audi R8	2001 Grand Prix of Mid-Ohio
Pro Mazda	1:16.3310	Rinus VeeKay	Tatuus PM-18	2018 Mid-Ohio Pro Mazda round
LMP3	1:16.916	Jagger Jones	Duqueine D-08	2024 Mid-Ohio IMSA VP Racing SportsCar Challenge round
GT1 (GTS)	1:17.186	Jan Magnussen	Chevrolet Corvette C6.R	2007 Sports Car Challenge of Mid-Ohio
LMP675	1:17.208	Jon Field	MG-Lola EX257	2002 American Le Mans at Mid-Ohio
Daytona Prototype	1:17.582	Brian Frisselle	Corvette Daytona Prototype	2013 Diamond Cellar Classic
WSC	1:17.589	Butch Leitzinger	Riley & Scott Mk III	2000 U.S. Road Racing Classic
GT1 (Prototype)	1:18.019	David Brabham	Panoz GTR-1	1998 U.S. Road Racing Classic
Formula Regional	1:18.729	Cooper Shipman	Ligier JS F3	2026 Mid-Ohio FR Americas round
LM GTE	1:19.086	Laurens Vanthoor	Porsche 911 RSR	2019 Sports Car Challenge of Mid-Ohio
IMSA GTP Lights	1:20.523	Parker Johnstone	Spice SE93P	1993 Nissan Grand Prix of Ohio
GT3	1:20.536	Jack Hawksworth	Lexus RC F GT3	2018 Acura Sports Car Challenge at Mid-Ohio
GT	1:20.778	Jörg Bergmeister	Porsche 911 (997) GT3 RSR	2012 Mid-Ohio Sports Car Challenge
Lamborghini Super Trofeo	1:20.997	Loris Spinelli	Lamborghini Huracán Super Trofeo	2018 Mid-Ohio Lamborghini Super Trofeo North America round
US F2000	1:21.2979	Kyle Kirkwood	Tatuus USF-17	2018 Cooper Tires USF2000 Grand Prix of Mid-Ohio
TA1	1:21.312	Paul Menard	Ford Mustang Trans-Am	2025 Mid-Ohio Trans-Am round
IMSA GTS	1:21.631	Tom Kendall	Ford Mustang	1993 Nissan Grand Prix of Ohio
IMSA GTO	1:23.160	Pete Halsmer	Mazda RX-7	1990 Nissan Grand Prix of Ohio
Barber Pro	1:23.740	Thed Björk	Reynard 98E	2000 Lime Rock Barber Pro round
TA2	1:24.211	Brent Crews	Ford Mustang Trans-Am	2024 Mid-Ohio Trans-Am round
Porsche Carrera Cup	1:24.292	Trenton Estep	Porsche 911 (991 II) GT3 Cup	2018 Mid-Ohio Porsche GT3 Cup Challenge USA round
Formula 4	1:24.593	Gastón Irazú	Ligier JS F422	2026 Mid-Ohio F4 United States round
GTO	1:25.122	Terry Borcheller	Saleen Mustang	2000 U.S. Road Racing Classic
USF Juniors	1:25.2376	Liam Loiacono	Tatuus JR-23	2025 PFC Grand Prix of Mid-Ohio
GT4	1:25.740	Cameron Shields	BMW M4 GT4 Evo (G82)	2026 O’Reilly Auto Parts Four Hours of Mid-Ohio
NASCAR Xfinity	1:25.897	Austin Cindric (Note: Both drivers took the same lap time independently.); Cole Custer	Ford Mustang	2019 B&L Transport 170
GT2	1:26.272	Stephane Roy	Mosler Intruder	1999 U.S. Sports Car Classic
Formula BMW	1:26.576	Richard Philippe	Mygale FB02	2005 Mid-Ohio Formula BMW USA round
TCR Touring Car	1:27.160	Louis-Philippe Montour	Honda Civic Type R TCR (FL5)	2026 O’Reilly Auto Parts Four Hours of Mid-Ohio
American GT	1:27.322	Tony Ave	Ford Mustang	2001 U.S. Road Racing Classic
NASCAR Truck	1:27.745	Parker Kligerman	Chevrolet Silverado NASCAR	2022 O'Reilly Auto Parts 150 at Mid-Ohio
Super Touring	1:28.181	David Donohue	Dodge Stratus	1997 Mid-Ohio NATCC round
ARCA Menards	1:28.237	Brent Crews	Toyota Camry	2024 Zinsser SmartCoat 150
GTU	1:28.344	Darren Law	Porsche 911 (996) GT3-R	2000 U.S. Road Racing Classic
Mustang Challenge	1:28.889	Sandy Satullo	Ford Mustang Dark Horse R	2026 Mid-Ohio Mustang Challenge round
USRRC GT3	1:28.918	David Murry	Porsche 911 Carrera RSR (993)	1999 U.S. Sports Car Classic
IMSA GTU	1:29.380	Stu Hayner	Dodge Daytona	1990 Nissan Grand Prix of Ohio
AAC	1:31.360	Rick Dittman	Oldsmobile Cutlass	1991 Nissan Grand Prix of Ohio
Mazda MX-5 Cup	1:34.698	Gresham Wagner	Mazda MX-5 (ND)	2024 Mid-Ohio Mazda MX-5 Cup round
IMSA Supercar	1:35.846	Shane Lewis	Chevrolet Corvette LT1	1995 Bridgestone Supercar Championship Mid-Ohio
Original Road Course (with Chicane before The Keyhole) (1963–present): 2.400 mi (3.862 km)
CART	1:19.984	Roberto Guerrero	March 87C	1987 Escort Radar Warning 200
IMSA GTP	1:20.920	Jan Lammers	Jaguar XJR-10	1989 Nissan Grand Prix of Ohio
Can-Am	1:22.219	Al Holbert	VDS-001	1982 Valvoline Budweiser/7-Eleven Can-Am
F5000	1:22.285	Al Unser	Lola T332	1975 Buckeye Cup
Group 7	1:22.470	George Follmer	Shadow DN4	1974 Buckeye Cup
Superbike	1:24.678	Cameron Beaubier	BMW M1000RR	2025 Mid-Ohio MotoAmerica Superbike round
Formula Atlantic	1:25.920	Whitney Ganz	Ralt RT4	1982 Red Roff Inns Formula Atlantic Challenge
Supersport	1:26.898	P. J. Jacobsen	Ducati Panigale V2	2025 Mid-Ohio MotoAmerica Supersport round
Group 6	1:27.260	Jim Trueman	Ralt RT2	1981 Mid-Ohio 500
IMSA GTO	1:27.600	Wally Dallenbach Jr.	Mercury Cougar XR-7	1989 Nissan Grand Prix of Ohio
IMSA GTP Lights	1:27.810	Charles Morgan	Spice SE89P	1989 Nissan Grand Prix of Ohio
IMSA GTX	1:28.520	Brian Redman	Lola T600	1981 Red Roof Inns GT 200
Group 5	1:29.350	Rolf Stommelen	Porsche 935	1981 Mid-Ohio 500
Twins Cup	1:29.789	Hank Vossberg	Aprilia RS660	2026 Mid-Ohio MotoAmerica round
Trans-Am	1:30.900	Scott Pruett	Merkur XR4Ti	1987 Mid-Ohio Trans-Am round
IMSA GTU	1:34.020	Joe Varde	Dodge Daytona	1989 Nissan Grand Prix of Ohio
Group 4 sports car	1:34.150	Dennis Aase	BMW M1	1981 Mid-Ohio 500
IMSA AC	1:35.980	Clay Young	Pontiac Grand Prix	1989 Nissan Grand Prix of Ohio
Supersport 300	1:37.471	Carson King	Kawasaki Ninja 400R	2024 Mid-Ohio MotoAmerica Supersport 300 round
Group 3 GT	1:51.000	Tom Payne (Note: All three drivers set the same lap time in this race independently.); Ken Miles; Bob Johnson	Shelby Cobra	1964 Mid-Ohio USRRC round

== The Mid-Ohio School ==
Founded in 1993, The Mid-Ohio School offers licensed drivers and motorcycle riders programs in defensive driving, high performance driving and performance track riding programs. Students in each course partake in classroom and private instruction and group drills. Participants test their newly refined skills in the controlled environment of the facility's Vehicle Dynamics Center and on the track.

The Mid-Ohio School is AAA Approved and recognized as a recent recipient of the Ohio State Highway Patrol's Partners for Safety award. 18 programs are available to drivers and riders of all ages and ability levels from defensive driving programs for teens and adults, on-track high performance courses for the automotive enthusiasts to current and aspiring racers.

There have been over 50,000 graduates from the Mid-Ohio School, including 18,500 teenagers and 13,300 motorcycle riders.
