= 1999 U.S. Sports Car Classic =

Track map of Mid-Ohio Sports Car Course.

The 1999 U.S. Road Racing Classic was the third and final race of the 1999 United States Road Racing Championship season. It took place on June 6, 1999, at Mid-Ohio Sports Car Course. The final two rounds of the season were cancelled due to a lack of entries in the top class (CA), which effectively made this race the finale.

The race was won by the team of Andy Wallace and James Weaver.

== Official results ==
Class winners in bold.

Pos	Class	No	Team	Drivers	Chassis	Tyre	Laps
Pos	Class	No	Team	Drivers	Engine	Tyre	Laps
1	**CA**	**16**	**(United States) Dyson Racing**	**(United Kingdom) Andy Wallace** **(United Kingdom) James Weaver**	**Riley & Scott Mk III**	**G**	**91**
1	**CA**	**16**	**(United States) Dyson Racing**	**(United Kingdom) Andy Wallace** **(United Kingdom) James Weaver**	**Ford 5.0L V8**	**G**	**91**
2	CA	20	(United States) Dyson Racing	(United States) Elliot Forbes-Robinson (United States) Butch Leitzinger	Riley & Scott Mk III	**G**	91
2	CA	20	(United States) Dyson Racing	(United States) Elliot Forbes-Robinson (United States) Butch Leitzinger	Ford 5.0 L V8	**G**	91
3	CA	8	(United States) Supportnet Racing	(United States) Henry Camferdam (United States) Scott Schubot	Riley & Scott Mk III	**G**	90
3	CA	8	(United States) Supportnet Racing	(United States) Henry Camferdam (United States) Scott Schubot	Ford 5.0 L V8	**G**	90
4	CA	29	(United States) Intersport Racing	(United States) Simon Gregg (United States) John Mirro	Riley & Scott Mk III	**G**	84
4	CA	29	(United States) Intersport Racing	(United States) Simon Gregg (United States) John Mirro	Ford 5.0 L V8	**G**	84
5	**GT2**	**99**	**(United States) Schumacher Racing**	**(United States) Larry Schumacher** **(United States) John O'Steen**	**Porsche 911 GT2**	**MI**	**84**
5	**GT2**	**99**	**(United States) Schumacher Racing**	**(United States) Larry Schumacher** **(United States) John O'Steen**	**Porsche 3.6L Turbo Flat-6**	**MI**	**84**
6	**GT3**	**02**	**(United States) Reiser Callas Rennsport**	**(United States) David Murry** **(United Kingdom) Johnny Mowlem**	**Porsche 911 Carrera RSR**	**P**	**84**
6	**GT3**	**02**	**(United States) Reiser Callas Rennsport**	**(United States) David Murry** **(United Kingdom) Johnny Mowlem**	**Porsche 3.8L Flat-6**	**P**	**84**
7	GT3	07	(United States) G&W Motorsports	(United States) Darren Law (United States) Cort Wagner	Porsche 911 Carrera RSR	**D**	84
7	GT3	07	(United States) G&W Motorsports	(United States) Darren Law (United States) Cort Wagner	Porsche 3.8 L Flat-6	**D**	84
8	GT3	51	(United States) Aspen Knolls Racing	(United States) Shane Lewis (United Kingdom) Andy Pilgrim	BMW M3	**Y**	84
8	GT3	51	(United States) Aspen Knolls Racing	(United States) Shane Lewis (United Kingdom) Andy Pilgrim	BMW 3.2 L I6	**Y**	84
9	CA	28	(United States) Intersport Racing	(United States) Jon Field (United States) Ryan Jones	Lola B98/10	**G**	84
9	CA	28	(United States) Intersport Racing	(United States) Jon Field (United States) Ryan Jones	Ford 5.0 L V8	**G**	84
10	GT3	03	(United States) Reiser Callas Rennsport	(United States) Joel Reiser (United States) Craig Stanton	Porsche 911 Carrera RSR	**P**	82
10	GT3	03	(United States) Reiser Callas Rennsport	(United States) Joel Reiser (United States) Craig Stanton	Porsche 3.8L Flat-6	**P**	82
11	GT3	64	(United States) Spencer Pumpelly Racing	(United States) Spencer Pumpelly (United States) Josh Rehm	Porsche 911 Carrera RSR	?	82
11	GT3	64	(United States) Spencer Pumpelly Racing	(United States) Spencer Pumpelly (United States) Josh Rehm	Porsche 3.8 L Flat-6	?	82
12	GT3	61	(United States) Paragon Motorsports	(United States) Keith Fisher (United States) Scott Brunk	Porsche 964 Cup	**P**	80
12	GT3	61	(United States) Paragon Motorsports	(United States) Keith Fisher (United States) Scott Brunk	Porsche 3.6 L Flat-6	**P**	80
13	GT3	12	(United States) Team Tech Racing	(United States) Joe Nonnamaker (United States) Scott Bove	Porsche 911 Supercup	?	76
13	GT3	12	(United States) Team Tech Racing	(United States) Joe Nonnamaker (United States) Scott Bove	Porsche 3.8 L Flat-6	?	76
14	GT3	08	(United States) G&W Motorsports	(United States) Steve Marshall (United States) Danny Marshall	Porsche 911 Carrera RSR	**D**	76
14	GT3	08	(United States) G&W Motorsports	(United States) Steve Marshall (United States) Danny Marshall	Porsche 3.8 L Flat-6	**D**	76
15	GT3	71	(United States) Dura Motorsports	(United Kingdom) Michael DeFontes (United States) Chris Thompson (United States) Jerry Thompson	Chevrolet Camaro	?	76
15	GT3	71	(United States) Dura Motorsports	(United Kingdom) Michael DeFontes (United States) Chris Thompson (United States) Jerry Thompson	Chevrolet 5.7 L V8	?	76
16 DNF	GT3	81	(United States) Fahlgren Racing	(United States) Lester Fahlgreen (United States) Dick Greer	Mazda RX-7	?	51
16 DNF	GT3	81	(United States) Fahlgren Racing	(United States) Lester Fahlgreen (United States) Dick Greer	Mazda 2.0 L 3-Rotor	?	51
17	GT3	57	(United States) Kryderacing	(United States) Reed Kryder (United States) Steve Ahlgrim	Nissan 240SX	**G**	45
17	GT3	57	(United States) Kryderacing	(United States) Reed Kryder (United States) Steve Ahlgrim	Nissan ? L V6	**G**	45
18 DNF	GT2	30	(United States) Mosler Automotive	(France) Loic Depailler (Canada) Stephane Roy (Portugal) João Barbosa	Mosler Intruder	?	43
18 DNF	GT2	30	(United States) Mosler Automotive	(France) Loic Depailler (Canada) Stephane Roy (Portugal) João Barbosa	Chevrolet 5.7 L V8	?	43
19 DNF	CA	74	(United States) Robinson Racing	(United States) George Robinson (United States) Jack Baldwin	Riley & Scott Mk III	?	32
19 DNF	CA	74	(United States) Robinson Racing	(United States) George Robinson (United States) Jack Baldwin	Chevrolet 6.0 L V8	?	32
20 DNF	CA	63	(United States) Downing/Atlanta	(United States) Chris Ronson	Kudzu DLY	**G**	32
20 DNF	CA	63	(United States) Downing/Atlanta	(United States) Chris Ronson	Mazda R26B 2.6 L 4-Rotor	**G**	32
21 DNF	GT2	4	(United States) Racing Technologies	(United States) John Engel (United States) Mark Knepper	SSZ Stradale Mk III	?	5
21 DNF	GT2	4	(United States) Racing Technologies	(United States) John Engel (United States) Mark Knepper	Nissan 3.0L Turbo V6	?	5
22 DNS	GT3	3	(United States) Toad Hall Motor Racing	(United States) Peter Kitchak	Porsche 911 Carrera RSR	?	0
22 DNS	GT3	3	(United States) Toad Hall Motor Racing	(United States) Peter Kitchak	Porsche 3.8 L Flat-6	?	0
23 DNS	CA	95	(United States) TRV Motorsport	(United States) Jeret Schroeder (United States) Tom Volk	Riley & Scott Mk III	**Y**	0
23 DNS	CA	95	(United States) TRV Motorsport	(United States) Jeret Schroeder (United States) Tom Volk	Chevrolet 6.0 L V8	**Y**	0

=== Statistics ===
- Pole Position - #16 Dyson Racing - 1:16.478
- Fastest lap - #20 Dyson Racing - 1:17.723
- Average Speed - 90.396 mph
