= List of AMA Superbike champions =

This is a complete list of AMA Superbike Championship champions since 1976.

== Champions ==
=== By season ===
Season	Champion	Wins	Motorcycle	Team
1976	(United Kingdom) Reg Pridmore	2	BMW R90S	Butler & Smith BMW
1977	(United Kingdom) Reg Pridmore (2)	1	Kawasaki Z1	Racecrafters Kawasaki
1978	(United Kingdom) Reg Pridmore (3)	0	Kawasaki Z1	Vetter Racing
1979	(United States) Wes Cooley	0	Suzuki GS1000	Yoshimura Suzuki
1980	(United States) Wes Cooley (2)	3	Suzuki GS1000	Yoshimura Suzuki
1981	(United States) Eddie Lawson	4	Kawasaki KZ1000	Muzzy Kawasaki
1982	(United States) Eddie Lawson (2)	5	Kawasaki KZ1000	Muzzy Kawasaki
1983	(United States) Wayne Rainey	6	Kawasaki GPz750	Muzzy Kawasaki
1984	(United States) Fred Merkel	10	Honda VF750F	American Honda
1985	(United States) Fred Merkel (2)	6	Honda VF750F	American Honda
1986	(United States) Fred Merkel (3)	2	Honda VFR750F	American Honda
1987	(United States) Wayne Rainey (2)	3	Honda VFR750F	American Honda
1988	(United States) Bubba Shobert	3	Honda VFR750F	American Honda
1989	(United States) Jamie James	1	Suzuki GSX-R750	Yoshimura Suzuki
1990	(United States) Doug Chandler	4	Kawasaki ZX-7	Muzzy Kawasaki
1991	(United States) Thomas Stevens	1	Yamaha FZR750R OW-01	Vance & Hines Yamaha
1992	(United States) Scott Russell	3	Kawasaki ZX-7R	Muzzy Kawasaki
1993	(United States) Doug Polen	6	Ducati 888	Fast by Ferracci Ducati
1994	(Australia) Troy Corser	3	Ducati 888	Fast by Ferracci Ducati
1995	(Canada) Miguel Duhamel	6	Honda RC45	Commonwealth Honda
1996	(United States) Doug Chandler (2)	2	Kawasaki ZX-7RR	Muzzy Kawasaki
1997	(United States) Doug Chandler (3)	1	Kawasaki ZX-7RR	Muzzy Kawasaki
1998	(United States) Ben Bostrom	0	Honda RC45	American Honda
1999	(Australia) Mat Mladin	1	Suzuki GSX-R750	Yoshimura Suzuki
2000	(Australia) Mat Mladin (2)	4	Suzuki GSX-R750	Yoshimura Suzuki
2001	(Australia) Mat Mladin (3)	4	Suzuki GSX-R750	Yoshimura Suzuki
2002	(United States) Nicky Hayden	9	Honda RC51	American Honda
2003	(Australia) Mat Mladin (4)	10	Suzuki GSX-R1000	Yoshimura Suzuki
2004	(Australia) Mat Mladin (5)	8	Suzuki GSX-R1000	Yoshimura Suzuki
2005	(Australia) Mat Mladin (6)	11	Suzuki GSX-R1000	Yoshimura Suzuki
2006	(United States) Ben Spies	10	Suzuki GSX-R1000	Yoshimura Suzuki
2007	(United States) Ben Spies (2)	7	Suzuki GSX-R1000	Yoshimura Suzuki
2008	(United States) Ben Spies (3)	7	Suzuki GSX-R1000	Yoshimura Suzuki
2009	(Australia) Mat Mladin (7)	10	Suzuki GSX-R1000	Yoshimura Suzuki
2010	(United States) Josh Hayes	7	Yamaha YZF-R1	Yamaha Factory Racing
2011	(United States) Josh Hayes (2)	3	Yamaha YZF-R1	Yamaha Factory Racing
2012	(United States) Josh Hayes (3)	16	Yamaha YZF-R1	Yamaha Factory Racing
2013	(United States) Josh Herrin	4	Yamaha YZF-R1	Yamaha Factory Racing
2014	(United States) Josh Hayes (4)	7	Yamaha YZF-R1	Yamaha Factory Racing
2015	(United States) Cameron Beaubier	8	Yamaha YZF-R1	Yamaha Factory Racing
2016	(United States) Cameron Beaubier (2)	8	Yamaha YZF-R1	Yamaha Factory Racing
2017	(Spain) Toni Elías	10	Suzuki GSX-R1000	Yoshimura Suzuki
2018	(United States) Cameron Beaubier (3)	7	Yamaha YZF-R1	Yamaha Factory Racing
2019	(United States) Cameron Beaubier (4)	6	Yamaha YZF-R1	Yamaha Factory Racing
2020	(United States) Cameron Beaubier (5)	16	Yamaha YZF-R1	Attack Performance Yamaha
2021	(United States) Jake Gagne	17	Yamaha YZF-R1	Attack Performance Yamaha
2022	(United States) Jake Gagne (2)	12	Yamaha YZF-R1	Attack Performance Yamaha
2023	(United States) Jake Gagne (3)	11	Yamaha YZF-R1	Attack Performance Yamaha
2024	(United States) Josh Herrin (2)	7	Ducati Panigale V4R	Warhorse HSBK Racing
2025	(United States) Cameron Beaubier (6)	6	BMW M1000RR	Tytlers Cycle Racing
2026	(United States) Bobby Fong	6	Yamaha YZF-R1	Attack Performance Progressive Yamaha Racing

=== By rider ===
Rider	Championships	Year(s)
(Australia) Mat Mladin	7	1999, 2000, 2001, 2003, 2004, 2005, 2009
(United States) Cameron Beaubier	6	2015, 2016, 2018, 2019, 2020, 2025
(United States) Josh Hayes	4	2010, 2011, 2012, 2014
(United Kingdom) Reg Pridmore	3	1976, 1977, 1978
(United States) Fred Merkel	3	1984, 1985, 1986
(United States) Doug Chandler	3	1990, 1996, 1997
(United States) Ben Spies	3	2006, 2007, 2008
(United States) Jake Gagne	3	2021, 2022, 2023
(United States) Josh Herrin	2	2013, 2024
(United States) Wes Cooley	2	1979, 1980
(United States) Eddie Lawson	2	1981, 1982
(United States) Wayne Rainey	2	1983, 1987
(United States) Bubba Shobert	1	1988
(United States) Jamie James	1	1989
(United States) Thomas Stevens	1	1991
(United States) Scott Russell	1	1992
(United States) Doug Polen	1	1993
(Australia) Troy Corser	1	1994
(Canada) Miguel Duhamel	1	1995
(United States) Ben Bostrom	1	1998
(United States) Nicky Hayden	1	2002
(Spain) Toni Elías	1	2017
(United States) Bobby Fong	1	2026

=== By nationality ===
Country	Championships	No. of Champions
United States	38	18
Australia	8	2
United Kingdom	3	1
Canada	1	1
Spain	1	1

=== By manufacturer ===
Manufacturer	Championships	Year(s)
(Japan) Yamaha	15	1991, 2010, 2011, 2012, 2013, 2014, 2015, 2016, 2018, 2019, 2020, 2021, 2022, 2023, 2026
(Japan) Suzuki	14	1979, 1980, 1989, 1999, 2000, 2001, 2003, 2004, 2005, 2006, 2007, 2008, 2009, 2017
(Japan) Kawasaki	9	1977, 1978, 1981, 1982, 1983, 1990, 1992, 1996, 1997
(Japan) Honda	8	1984, 1985, 1986, 1987, 1988, 1995, 1998, 2002
(Italy) Ducati	3	1993, 1994, 2024
(Germany) BMW	2	1976, 2025
