= Cook Neilson =

American motorcycle racer

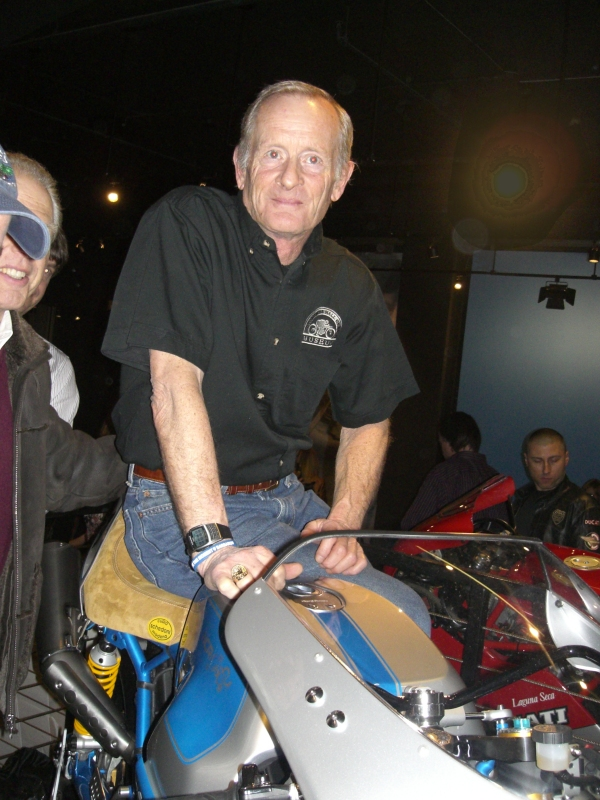
Neilson sitting on New Blue

Cook Neilson (born August 24, 1943) is an American former journalist and motorcycle racer known widely for his win on a Ducati 750SS at the Daytona International Speedway in 1977. He graduated from Princeton in the mid-1960s, was hired as associate editor of Cycle in September 1967; promoted to editor in 1969, and is credited for making that magazine successful through the 1970s. While at Cycle magazine, he wrote a series of articles on the cookbook construction of a 160 mph (260 km/h) Top Fuel Harley-Davidson Sportster.

Neilson wrote briefly also at Car and Driver in the late 1960s, notably excoriating the 1968 Kadett LS 1.5L wagon in what has been described as an automotive assassination review, sacrificing the car in order to increase the magazine's prominence.

== Racing career ==
During his motorcycle racing career, Neilson had thirty-eight starts and nineteen wins; all on the Ducati 750SS. He also occasionally raced for the Butler & Smith BMW team and the Racecrafter Kawasaki team. Neilson had three podium finishes at Daytona: 1975 (First), 1976 (Third), and 1977 (First). In the 1977 AMA Superbike Championship, Neilson finished just a few points behind the series champion, Reg Pridmore who rode a Kawasaki Kz1000.

Neilson was inducted into the Ducati North America Hall of Fame, and the AMA Motorcycle Hall of Fame in 2006.

In 2006, Ducati Motor Holdings announced a limited edition replica of Neilson's 750SS winning motorcycle, which he had nicknamed "Old Blue." This motorcycle, named New Blue, was customized by the NCR racing house based in Bologna. The race replica is in honor of the 30th anniversary of Neilson's win at Daytona.

Cook crashed a Desmosedici RR, one of 1,500 produced, at a Ducati-sponsored trackday at Putnam Park Roadcourse on September 15, 2008. He was not injured in the accident.

== Car and Driver ==
In the February 1968 issue of Car and Driver, Neilson authored a uniformly scathing review of the 1968 Kadett LS 1.5L wagon. The vehicle, which by all accounts was in fact a fairly well-executed example in its class, received a singly critical response from Nielson, with General Motors subsequently pulling its advertising from the magazine. Paul Niedermeyer, editor of the automotive history site Curbside Classics, would later call the review "sophmoric" and "blantantly contrived." Author Marty Padgett, in his book "50 Years With Car and Driver,” recounted that the magazine's editor had wanted a diatribe in order to increase the magazine's relevance.
