= Wes Cooley (motorcyclist) =

American motorcycle racer (1956–2021)

- Born: Wesley Steven Cooley; June 28, 1956; Los Angeles, California, U.S.
- Died: October 16, 2021 (aged 65); Twin Falls, Idaho, U.S.
- Occupation: Motorcycle racer

Wester Steven Cooley (June 28, 1956 – October 16, 2021), better known as Wes, was an American motorcycle road racer in the AMA Superbike class. He won the 1979 and 1980 AMA Superbike Championships on a Yoshimura Suzuki GS1000s.

== Career ==
Born in Los Angeles, California, Cooley got his start on the Southern California club racing scene where his father ran a club racing organization. He honed his skills in the smaller classes before being hired by Pops Yoshimura to race a Kawasaki KZ1000 in the newly formed AMA production class. He won his first AMA superbike race in 1977. For the 1978 season, Yoshimura switched to better handling Suzuki bikes and Cooley began winning regularly. He teamed up with Mike Baldwin to win the prestigious Suzuka 8 Hours race in Japan. In 1980, he teamed up with Graeme Crosby to win at Suzuka a second time. Cooley went on to win his first superbike national championship in 1979. He successfully defended his crown in 1980 by fighting off future Hall of Famers Eddie Lawson on a Kawasaki and Freddie Spencer on a Honda.

In 1985, Cooley suffered life-threatening injuries in a crash at Sears Point Raceway. He eventually recovered to race again but he was never able to recapture his form. After his retirement from racing, he worked as an instructor at a riding school (WCRA) before taking up a career in the medical profession. Cooley was inducted into the AMA Motorcycle Hall of Fame in 2004.

== Death ==
Cooley died Saturday, October 16, 2021, at his home in Twin Falls, Idaho, from complications of diabetes. He was 65 years old and is survived by his partner of many years, Melody Rose, along with son Wes Jr. and daughter Alexis.

== Career statistics ==
=== Suzuka 8 Hours results ===
Year	Team	Co-Rider	Bike	Pos
1978	(Japan) Yoshimura Racing	(United States) Mike Baldwin (United States) Wes Cooley	Suzuki GS1000	1st
1980	(Japan) Yoshimura R&D	(New Zealand) Graeme Crosby (United States) Wes Cooley	Suzuki GS1000	1st

Preceded by Reg Pridmore	AMA Superbike Champion; 1979–1980	Succeeded by Eddie Lawson
