= 2013 AMA Pro American Superbike Championship =

2013 AMA Pro Am Superbike Championship

Seasons
- ← 2012 2014 →

The 2013 AMA Pro American Superbike Championship was the 38th running of the AMA Superbike Championship. The championship covered 8 rounds beginning at Daytona International Speedway on March 16 and concluding at Mazda Raceway Laguna Seca on September 29. The champion was Josh Herrin riding a Yamaha.

== Calendar ==
Round		Date	Circuit	Location	Pole position	Fastest lap	Winning rider	Winning team
1	R1	March 15	(Florida) Daytona International Speedway	Daytona Beach, Florida	(United States) Josh Hayes	(United States) Josh Hayes	(United States) Josh Herrin	Monster Energy Graves Yamaha
1	R2	March 16	(Florida) Daytona International Speedway	Daytona Beach, Florida	(United States) Josh Hayes	(Colombia) Martín Cárdenas	(Colombia) Martín Cárdenas	Yoshimura Suzuki Factory Racing
2	R1	June 1	(Wisconsin) Road America	Elkhart Lake, Wisconsin	(United States) Josh Hayes	(United States) Josh Hayes	(United States) Josh Hayes	Monster Energy Graves Yamaha
2	R2	June 2	(Wisconsin) Road America	Elkhart Lake, Wisconsin	(United States) Josh Hayes	(United States) Josh Hayes	(United States) Josh Hayes	Monster Energy Graves Yamaha
3	R1	June 22	(Alabama) Barber Motorsports Park	Leeds, Alabama	(United States) Josh Hayes	(United States) Roger Hayden	(United States) Josh Hayes	Monster Energy Graves Yamaha
3	R2	June 23	(Alabama) Barber Motorsports Park	Leeds, Alabama	(United States) Josh Hayes	(United States) Roger Hayden	(United States) Josh Hayes	Monster Energy Graves Yamaha
4	R1	July 13	Mid-Ohio Sports Car Course	Lexington, Ohio	(United States) Josh Hayes	(United States) Josh Herrin	(United States) Josh Hayes	Monster Energy Graves Yamaha
4	R2	July 14	Mid-Ohio Sports Car Course	Lexington, Ohio	(United States) Josh Hayes	(United States) Roger Hayden	(United States) Josh Herrin	Monster Energy Graves Yamaha
5	R1	July 21	(California) Mazda Raceway Laguna Seca^{†}	Monterey, California	(United States) Josh Hayes	(United States) Josh Hayes	(United States) Josh Hayes	Monster Energy Graves Yamaha
6	R1	August 3	(Utah) Miller Motorsports Park	Tooele, Utah	(United States) Josh Hayes	(United States) Roger Hayden	(United States) Josh Herrin	Monster Energy Graves Yamaha
6	R2	August 4	(Utah) Miller Motorsports Park	Tooele, Utah	(United States) Josh Hayes	(United States) Roger Hayden	(Colombia) Martín Cárdenas	Yoshimura Suzuki Factory Racing
7	R1	September 14	New Jersey Motorsports Park	Millville, New Jersey	(United States) Josh Hayes	(Colombia) Martín Cárdenas	(United States) Josh Herrin	Monster Energy Graves Yamaha
7	R2	September 15	New Jersey Motorsports Park	Millville, New Jersey	(United States) Josh Hayes	(United States) Josh Hayes	(United States) Josh Hayes	Monster Energy Graves Yamaha
8	R1	September 29	(California) Mazda Raceway Laguna Seca^{‡}	Monterey, California	(United States) Josh Hayes	(United States) Josh Hayes	(United States) Josh Hayes	Monster Energy Graves Yamaha

† = MotoGP weekend
‡ = World Superbike weekend
