= 2012 AMA Pro American Superbike Championship =

2012 AMA Pro Am Superbike Championship

Seasons
- ← 2011 2013 →

The 2012 AMA Pro American Superbike Championship was the 37th running of the AMA Superbike Championship. The championship covered 11 rounds beginning at Daytona International Speedway on March 17 and concluding at NOLA Motorsports Park on October 7. The champion was Josh Hayes riding a Yamaha.

== Calendar ==
Round		Date	Circuit	Location	Pole position	Fastest lap	Winning rider	Winning team
1	R1	March 16	(Florida) Daytona International Speedway	Daytona Beach, Florida	(United States) Josh Hayes	(United States) Josh Hayes	(United States) Josh Hayes	Monster Energy Graves Yamaha
1	R2	March 17	(Florida) Daytona International Speedway	Daytona Beach, Florida	(United States) Josh Hayes	(United States) Blake Young	(United States) Blake Young	Yoshimura Racing
2	R1	April 21	(Georgia (U.S. state)) Road Atlanta	Braselton, Georgia	(United States) Josh Hayes	(United States) Blake Young	(United States) Blake Young	Yoshimura Racing
2	R2	April 22	(Georgia (U.S. state)) Road Atlanta	Braselton, Georgia	(United States) Josh Hayes	(United States) Josh Hayes	(United States) Josh Hayes	Monster Energy Graves Yamaha
3	R1	May 5	(California) Infineon Raceway	Sonoma, California	(United States) Josh Hayes	(United States) Josh Hayes	(United States) Josh Hayes	Monster Energy Graves Yamaha
3	R2	May 6	(California) Infineon Raceway	Sonoma, California	(United States) Josh Hayes	(United States) Blake Young	(United States) Blake Young	Yoshimura Racing
4	R1	May 28	(Utah) Miller Motorsports Park^{†}	Tooele, Utah	(United States) Josh Hayes	(United States) Josh Hayes	(United States) Josh Hayes	Monster Energy Graves Yamaha
5	R1	June 2	(Wisconsin) Road America	Elkhart Lake, Wisconsin	(United States) Josh Hayes	(United States) Josh Hayes	(United States) Josh Hayes	Monster Energy Graves Yamaha
5	R2	June 3	(Wisconsin) Road America	Elkhart Lake, Wisconsin	(United States) Josh Hayes	(United States) Josh Hayes	(United States) Josh Hayes	Monster Energy Graves Yamaha
6	R1	June 23	(Alabama) Barber Motorsports Park	Leeds, Alabama	(United States) Josh Hayes	(United States) Josh Hayes	(United States) Josh Hayes	Monster Energy Graves Yamaha
6	R2	June 24	(Alabama) Barber Motorsports Park	Leeds, Alabama	(United States) Josh Hayes	(United States) Josh Herrin	(United States) Josh Hayes	Monster Energy Graves Yamaha
7	R1	July 14	Mid-Ohio Sports Car Course	Lexington, Ohio	(United States) Josh Hayes	(United States) Josh Herrin	(United States) Josh Hayes	Monster Energy Graves Yamaha
7	R2	July 15	Mid-Ohio Sports Car Course	Lexington, Ohio	(United States) Josh Hayes	(United States) Roger Hayden	(United States) Josh Hayes	Monster Energy Graves Yamaha
8	R1	July 29	(California) Mazda Raceway Laguna Seca^{‡}	Monterey, California	(United States) Josh Hayes	(United States) Josh Hayes	(United States) Josh Hayes	Monster Energy Graves Yamaha
9	R1	September 8	New Jersey Motorsports Park	Millville, New Jersey	(United States) Josh Hayes	(United States) Josh Hayes	(United States) Josh Hayes	Monster Energy Graves Yamaha
9	R2	September 9	New Jersey Motorsports Park	Millville, New Jersey	(United States) Josh Hayes	(United States) Josh Hayes	(United States) Josh Hayes	Monster Energy Graves Yamaha
10	R1	September 22	(Florida) Homestead-Miami Speedway	Homestead, Florida	(United States) Roger Hayden	(United States) Roger Hayden	(United States) Roger Hayden	National Guard Jordan Suzuki
10	R2	September 23	(Florida) Homestead-Miami Speedway	Homestead, Florida	(United States) Roger Hayden	(United States) Steve Rapp	(United States) Josh Hayes	Monster Energy Graves Yamaha
11	R1	October 6	(Louisiana) NOLA Motorsports Park	Avondale, Louisiana	(United States) Josh Hayes	(United States) Josh Hayes	(United States) Josh Hayes	Monster Energy Graves Yamaha
11	R2	October 7	(Louisiana) NOLA Motorsports Park	Avondale, Louisiana	(United States) Josh Hayes	(United States) Josh Hayes	(United States) Josh Hayes	Monster Energy Graves Yamaha

† = World Superbike Weekend
‡ = MotoGP weekend
