= Reg Pridmore =

English motorcyclist

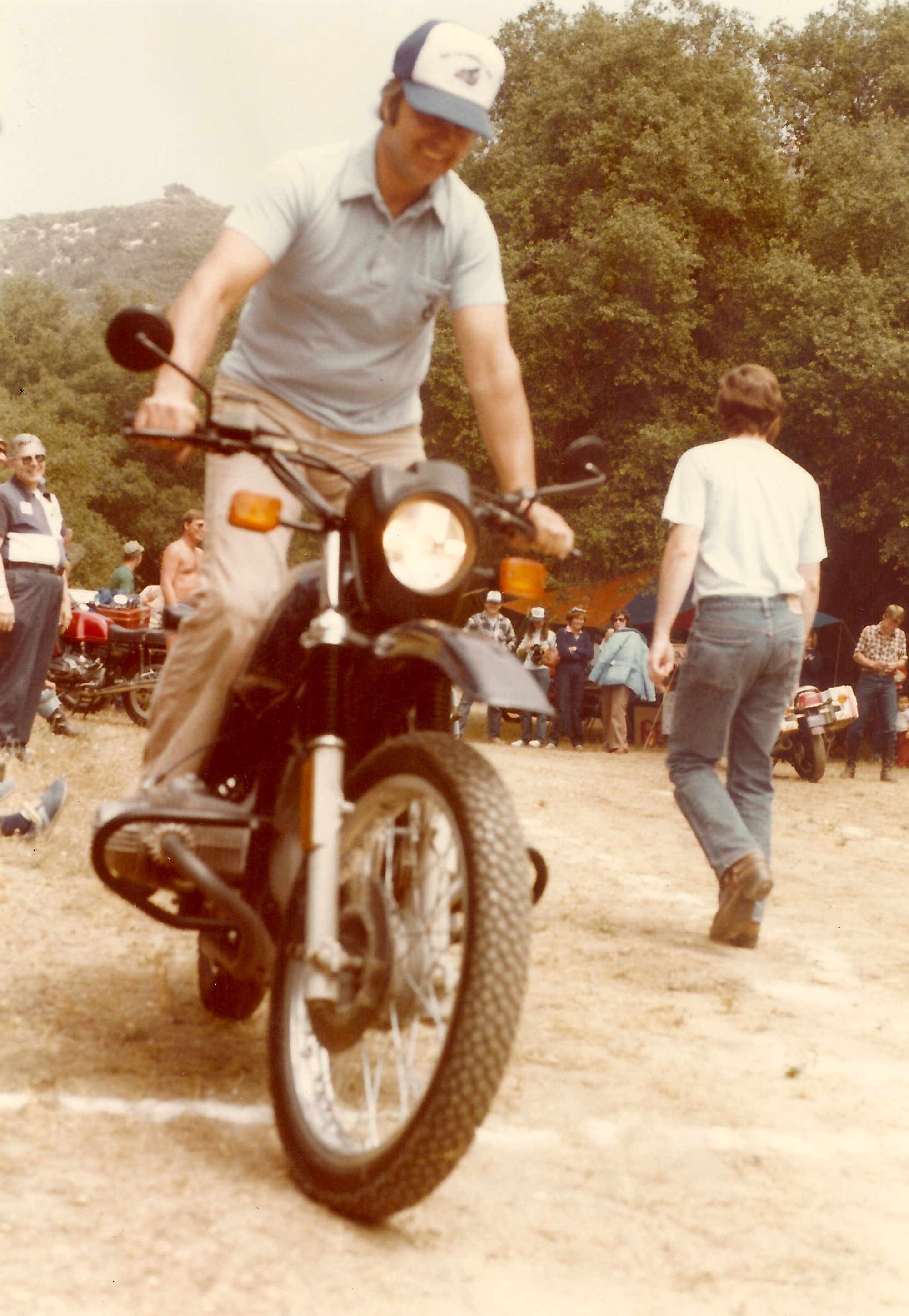
- Pridmore riding a 1982 R80G/S in the Slow Race at the 1982 South Coast BMW Riders Club Fiesta Rally
- Nationality: English
- Born: 15 July 1939 (age 87); London, England UK

Reginald Charles Pridmore III (born 15 July 1939) is an English former professional motorcycle racer. He competed in British and American motorcycle road racing events from the early 1960s until the late 1970s, most prominently as a three-time AMA Superbike National Champion. Pridmore won the inaugural 1976 AMA Superbike Championship riding a BMW motorcycle at a time when BMWs were considered to be outdated touring motorcycles rather than proper racing motorcycles. In 2002, he was inducted into the AMA Motorcycle Hall of Fame. He is the father of retired AMA racer Jason Pridmore.

== Early Days ==
Pridmore was born in East London, England, on July 19, 1939 just six weeks before the start of the Second World War. In 1943, he survived a Luftwaffe bombing raid that left him and his mother buried in rubble for several hours. Afterwards he was evacuated to Essex where he would grow up living with relatives.

Pridmore began riding motorcycles in 1954 and worked as a motorcycle courier for Lloyd's of London. After his national service he got married and worked as a welder at the Greeves motorcycle factory and then at the Ford Dagenham factory. He became part of the Café racer motorcycle culture centered around the Ace Cafe in North West London. He began his motorcycle racing career in the early 1960s, riding a 350cc AJS motorcycle. He won his first race riding a Triumph Tiger T110 at the Silverstone Circuit.

== Move to America ==
Pridmore grew disenchanted with the deprivations of post-war Britain and in 1964 he and his wife made the decision to sell all their possessions and move to the United States. He settled in Santa Barbara, California and found employment at a new Honda motorcycle distributor. He soon began competing in local motorcycle events, riding a 125cc Bultaco previously raced by World Championship competitor Ginger Molloy. By the early 1970s, Pridemore's racing ability got the attention of a distributor for Norton motorcycles who offered him motorcycles to compete in select AMA national championship road races in 1971.

In 1972 he was given the opportunity to race BMW R75/5 motorcycles for the American importer for BMW motorcycles, Butler & Smith. With the aid of talented engine tuner, Udo Gietl, who had previously worked in the Apollo space program, Pridmore was able to transform the staid BMW touring motorcycle into a purposeful racing machine. However, by the mid 1970s advances in two-stroke engine technology had rendered four-stroke motorcycles obsolete, so a Southern California motorcycle racing club created a new racing category for street-legal production-based motorcycles. The new category grew in popularity and at the 1975 Daytona 200, a support race for production-based motorcycles was included into the race program.

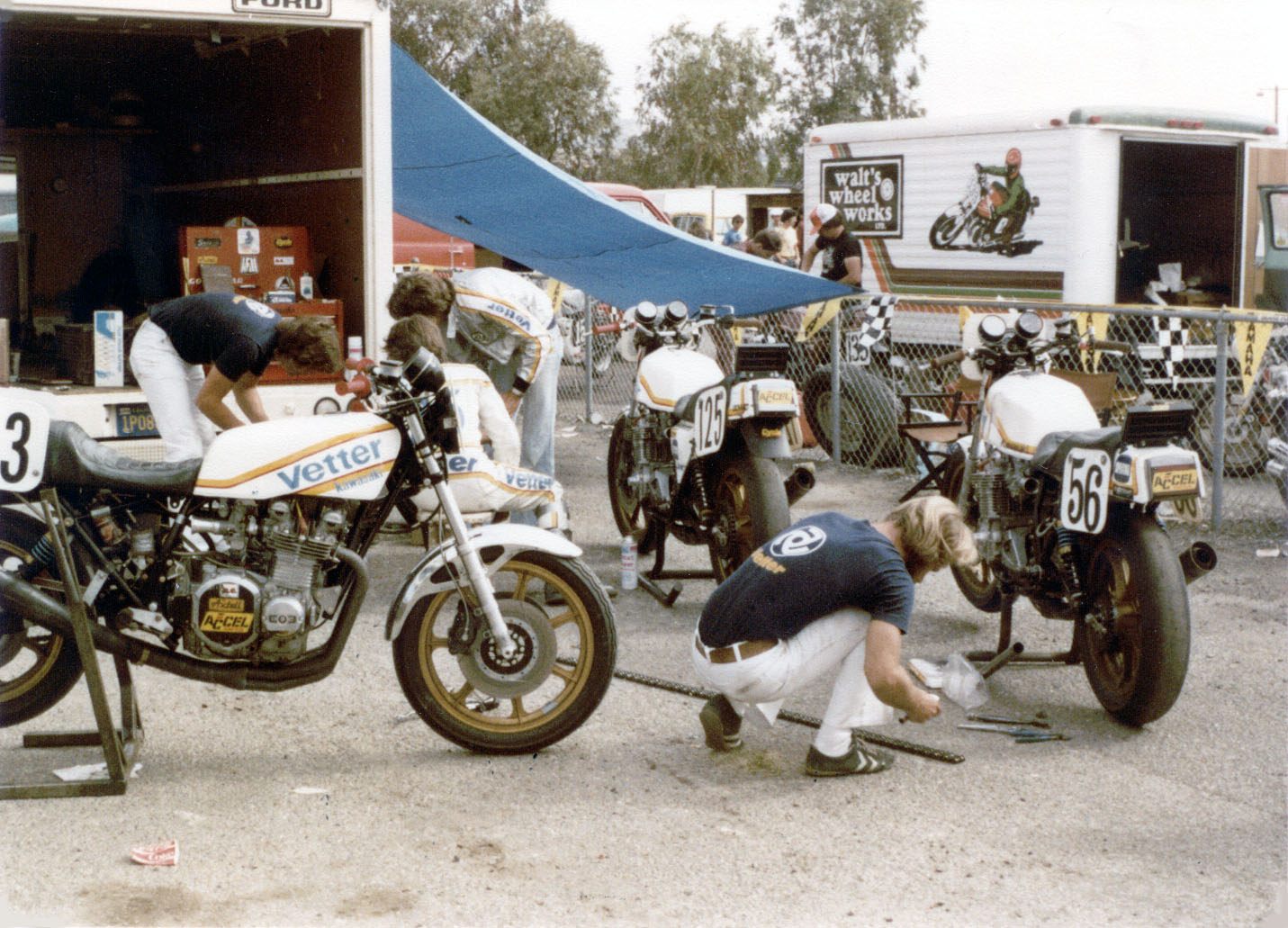
1979 Vetter team at Sears Point Raceway showing (at rear of machine 163) from left, Pierre des Roches, Reg Pridmore (seated, in white leathers) and Keith Code wearing short jacket

In 1976, the AMA introduced a new national championship for production-based bikes called the AMA Superbike Championship. Riding a BMW R90S, Pridmore won his first AMA Superbike National race on August 1, 1976, at the Laguna Seca Raceway, then won the final round of the year at the Riverside International Raceway to clinch the inaugural AMA Superbike National Championship. His victory on the supposedly outdated BMW motorcycle against more advanced Japanese machinery made a large impression on the motorcycling world.

When BMW withdrew from AMA racing, Pridmore was hired by Los Angeles motorcycle distributor, Racecrafters to compete in the 1977 AMA Superbike Championship riding a Kawasaki Z1000 with Pierre des Roches and Keith Code as team mechanics. He posted a series of consistent top-five results to successfully defend his title ahead of Ducati rider Cook Neilson. His victory on a Kawasaki marked the first AMA Superbike Championship for a Japanese manufacturer. Pridmore went on to win his third consecutive AMA Superbike Championship in 1978 riding for the Vetter team, again on a Pierre des Roches prepared Kawasaki. He was 39 years old when he won his final championship, making him the oldest AMA Superbike champion. He retired from motorcycle competitions after suffering serious injuries during a race at Laguna Seca Raceway in 1979.

== Sidecar racing ==
In 1966, while recovering from serious injuries sustained in an American motorcycle race, Pridmore began to participate in motorcycle sidecar racing because his injuries prevented him from riding a conventional motorcycle. After experiencing success in American sidecar racing riding a Norton-powered sidecar, he entered the 1971 Isle of Man TT where he scored a 32th place result in the Sidecar TT. During breaks in the AMA Superbike Championship, Pridemore returned to the Isle of Man TT in 1978 and 1979 riding a sidecar fitted with a Yamaha TZ750 engine that had previously been used by Don Vesco in the Silver Bird streamliner to break the 300 mph barrier for motorcycles in 1975 at the Bonneville Speedway.

== Later life ==
After his retirement from racing Pridmore established CLASS, one of the top motorcycle track-riding schools in the United States. In 2002, he was inducted into the AMA Motorcycle Hall of Fame.

Pridmore and his Ventura, California-based RPM Motorcycles shop attended several of the South Coast BMW Riders Club's Fiesta Rallies in the early 1980s. The photo shows Reg on a 1982 BMW R80G/S participating in the rally Slow Race.

He now lives in Santa Paula, California, where he owns a hangar at Santa Paula Airport KSZP. He keeps his motorcycles, a Scout airplane and a small hangar museum there.

Preceded by None	AMA Superbike Champion; 1976-1978	Succeeded by Wes Cooley
