= Cycle News =

Motorcycling magazine

- Issue from April 29, 1969
- Editor-in-Chief: Kit Palmer
- Categories: Motorcycle, Motorcycle Racing
- Frequency: Weekly
- Founder: Chuck and Sharon Clayton
- Founded: 1965
- First issue: October 14, 1965
- Final issue Number: September 8, 2010; Volume 47, Issue 35
- Country: United States
- Based in: Irvine, California
- Language: English
- Website: cyclenews.com

Cycle News is a motorcycling magazine and website based in the United States, it was a weekly print publication from 1965 to 2010 and switched to a weekly digital magazine in February 2011. The magazine is headquartered in Murrieta, California and is best known for coverage of all forms of motorcycle racing.

== History ==
Cycle News was founded in 1965, in Long Beach, California by Chuck and Sharon Clayton. Chuck Clayton purchased a troubled Los Angeles-area motorcycling newspaper and changed its name to Cycle News. The Claytons initially ran Cycle News out of their living room. Chuck worked exclusively on the newspaper, relying on Sharon’s income at JR Engineering to support the family and keep Cycle News afloat. On evenings and weekends, Sharon handled the business side of the newspaper, and worked as a photographer and reporter. The Clayton family provided coverage of local and international races, and was a key source for racing results. Cycle News covered road racing, off-road, motocross, supercross, enduro, flat track, speedway, and drag racing, which appealed to a broad range of motorcycle enthusiasts. Cycle News eventually became one of the highest selling newspapers/magazines in the industry, and it had offices on the East and West coasts during its 45-year history.

== End of print magazine ==
Cycle News was one of several motorcycle magazines that failed during the 2008 financial crisis, and the rapid expansion in online media. On August 27, 2010, editor Paul Carruthers announced that he was no longer employed at Cycle News. Carruthers had worked at Cycle News for twenty-five years and had been the editor of the publication since 1993.

Cycle News closed on August 31, 2010; the issue printed the week of August 30, 2010 was its last. News about the closure was first revealed on the social networking site Facebook after several staff members made posts about having lost their jobs. Cycle News made an official announcement on September 3, 2010, that it had ceased print publication. On September 7, 2010, publisher Bob NorVelle reported that Cycle News would continue to feature motorcycle news at its website.

== Digital revival ==
In November 2010, Motorsport Aftermarket Group (MAG) purchased Cycle News from Sharon Clayton, and Paul Carruthers was hired to re-launch the magazine/website. The magazine was re-launched in February 2011 as a weekly digital magazine. In May 2013, Cycle News launched their digital archive of print issues dating back to the 1960s available through a paid subscription.

In October 2014, MotoAmerica announced Paul Carruthers would be leaving Cycle News to become the communications manager for the newly formed racing series, ending his 30-year career with the publication. Following the announcement, Cycle News appointed long-time off-road editor Kit Palmer as editor starting November 1, 2014.
