= Kawasaki KZ1000 =

KZ1000
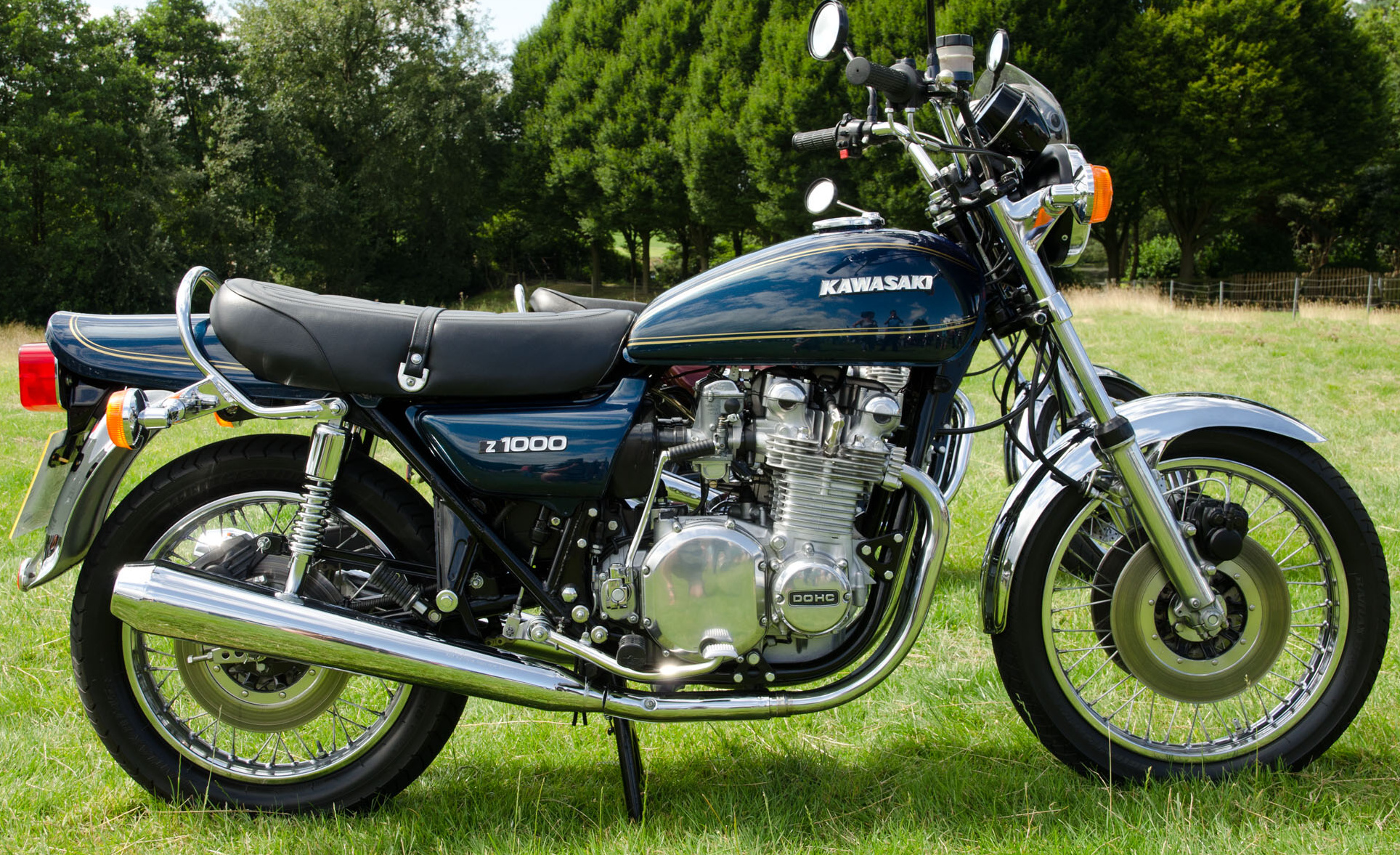
- 1977 Kawasaki Z1000 exhibited at classic car show in 2014
- Manufacturer: Kawasaki
- Parent company: Kawasaki Heavy Industries
- Production: 1977–2005
- Predecessor: Kawasaki Z1
- Successor: KZ1100
- Engine: 1,015 cc (61.9 cu in) 1977-1981; 998 cc (60.9 cu in) 1981-2005 4 stroke DOHC air cooled Inline 4,
- Bore / stroke: 70 mm / 69.4 mm × 66 mm (2.76 in / 2.73 in × 2.60 in)
- Compression ratio: 8.7:1
- Top speed: 132 mph (212 km/h)
- Power: 83 hp (62 kW) @ 8,000 rpm (1977), 90 hp (67 kW)(1978)
- Wheelbase: 1,505 mm (59.3 in)
- Dimensions: L: 2,210 mm (87 in); W: 880 mm (35 in); H: 1,200 mm (47 in)
- Weight: 245.5 kg (541 lb) (dry); 563 lb (255 kg)(½ tank) (wet)
- Fuel capacity: 16.7 L (4.4 US gal)
- Fuel consumption: 45 mpg_{‑US} (5.2 L/100 km)
- Turning radius: 2.4 m (7.9 ft)
- Related: Z 1000 Z1- R

The Kawasaki Kz1000 or Z1000 is a motorcycle made in Japan by Kawasaki, manufacturing commenced in September 1976 for the 1977 model year. The Z1000A1 was an upgraded model to replace the 1976 Kawasaki KZ900 (Z900), which in turn replaced the Z1 launched in 1972 in the Z series. It has an inline-four cylinder engine and a 5-speed transmission, in a 'one down and four up' configuration. Producing about 83 hp, it was one of the fastest production motorcycles of the era. The police model continued in production until 2005.

== Model differences ==
Some of the significant differences between the KZ900 and the KZ1000 include that the 1000 has a heavier crankshaft for less engine vibration, smoother acceleration and a larger displacement as a result of increasing the cylinder bore from 66mm to 70mm. The 1000 received a rear disc brake. There were various configurations of specifications and assembly, such as having the choice between chain-drive and shaft-drive. The cruiser version LTD was assembled in Nebraska and sold in the United States and Canada.

Kawasaki swapped the traditional 4-4 exhaust (available on Z1 and KZ900) for the 4-2 Jardine exhaust (which came standard on the KZ900B) on the LTD and quiet and restrictive muffler on the 1000 A1 and A2 as shown in the top photo in this article. The KZ1000 came with either a chain drive or shaft drive in 1979 and 1980 named ST and SHAFT, KZ1000E1 and E2. The frame on the KZ1000 was a conventional featherbed (duplex cradle) design, but was not significantly changed in over 30 years of production in terms of basic geometry. There were changes to frame construction with the use of thicker frame tubes in the MkII models (1979/80) to improve frame rigidity.

The 1980 Kawasaki Z1000H was the first mass-produced fuel-injected motorcycle in the world and also Kawasaki's first fuel injected motorcycle. It was based on the KZ1000A3/A4 Mk.II frame and body work, with a unique black/gold/white colour scheme and gold mag wheels . There were only 1000 examples of the Z1000H made for the global market. The Z1000H was manufactured for 3 months only, during March/April/May 1980 and was a test-bed for the incoming new 1981 fuel-injected model, the GPz1100B1.

In the US market, the Z1000G "Z-1 Classic", based on the LTD frame and body work, also featured the same fuel injection system used on the Z1000H.

The 1981 Kawasaki Z1000J debuted with Kawasaki's new "J" motor with displacement down to 998 cc (60.9 cu in) the drop in displacement from 1015cc to 998cc was in order to comply with the new rule for superbike racing-which stipulated a maximum of 1000cc.

For the 1982 model year, Kawasaki introduced the KZ1000R1 Eddie Lawson Replica (ELR); based on the KZ1000J2. The 1983 model was designated KZ1000R2 with cams and a cylinder head from the 1982 GPz1100B2, boosted power from 102 to 104 at 8500 rpm. The bike had a limited run of 750, and was named after the Eddie Lawson 1981-1982 Superbike. It had a claimed 59 kW (79 hp) rear wheel HP @ 8,500rpm and 246.5 kg (543.5 lb) dry.

Aside from the 1982-2005 KZ1000P Police motorcycle, the model was discontinued in 1984, in favor of Kawasaki's liquid-cooled bike, the Ninja GPZ900R.

== Wheels and tyres ==
The Kz1000P (police) has 18 inch cast wheels with Dunlop run-flat tires. The front tire is size MN90-18, and the back tire is size MR90-18.

== Accessories ==
The KZ1000 had optional dealer installed Windjammer brand fairing, saddle bags, sissy bar and highway bars. Highway bars were also used for comfort on long trips and sometimes held additional lighting.

== Z1000 Z1-R ==
Kawasaki Z1-R
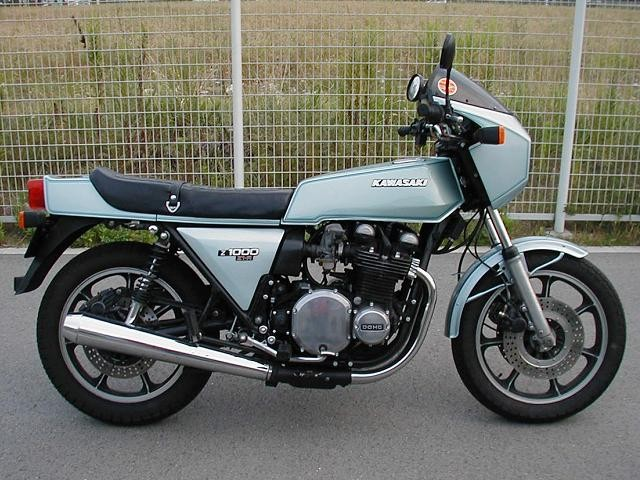
- Manufacturer: Kawasaki Motorcycle & Engine Company
- Parent company: Kawasaki Heavy Industries
- Production: 1978–1980
- Class: Standard (muscle bike)
- Engine: DOHC 1,015 cc (61.9 cu in) air-cooled, inline-four
- Bore / stroke: 69.4 mm × 66 mm (2.73 in × 2.60 in)
- Compression ratio: 8.7:1
- Top speed: 132 mph (212 km/h)
- Power: 90 hp (67 kW) (claimed) @ 8,000 rpm
- Transmission: Wet clutch, 5-speed, chain
- Frame type: Double tubular steel cradle
- Suspension: Front 36 mmTelescopic hydraulics forks Rear Dual shocks, swinging arm,
- Brakes: Front2x 296mm discs Rear Single 290mm disc
- Tires: Front3.50-18; Rear4.00-18
- Rake, trail: 26°
- Weight: 541 lb (245 kg) (dry)
- Fuel capacity: 13 L; 2.8 imp gal (3.4 US gal)
- Fuel consumption: 5.2 L/100 km; 54 mpg_{‑imp} (45 mpg_{‑US})
- Related: Z1000 MKII; Kz1000

The Kawasaki Z1000 Z1-R is a Japanese motorcycle from Kawasaki Heavy Industries. Styling characteristics are the front fairing, black engine finish, the 4-into-1 factory exhaust system and cast wheels.

=== History ===
Following the success of the original Z1000, Kawasaki developed the "Z1-R" as a new top model that would set standards in design and performance. This emphasized motorcycle with a fixed half-shell fairing was only available with a metallic stardust silver paint. Although the design was well received from the potential buyers, sales remained unsatisfactory after tests in motorcycle magazines. They criticized the poor engine performance and the small fuel tank.

Readers of the German Motorrad magazine selected the Z1-R as their Motorcycle of the Year for 1977.

=== Z1R-TC ===
The Z1-R was introduced for the 1978 model year, the same year as the Yamaha XS11, the Suzuki GS1000, and the Honda CBX. Magazine tests showed all three competing bikes to be quicker in the [|quarter mile] performance test. In response, the company quickly introduced the semi-production, turbocharged Z1R-TC.

== Police use ==
The KZ1000C and KZ1000P were police sub-models. The KZ1000C was based on the 1977-1980 KZ1000 (KZ1000 C1-C4 from 1978 to 1981) while the KZ1000P (KZ1000P1-P24 from 1982 to 2005) was based on the "J" model. They had a number of technical problems, including electromagnetic interference between some radios that caused problems for the ignition system. In addition, the combined set of equipment mounted at the rear (and particularly the placement of the radio on the rear rack) caused high-speed handling difficulties.. That said, with a relatively light weight, comfortable seat, good cornering clearance and powerful engine, it remained so popular for the police market that it remained in production until 2005.

== Motorsport ==
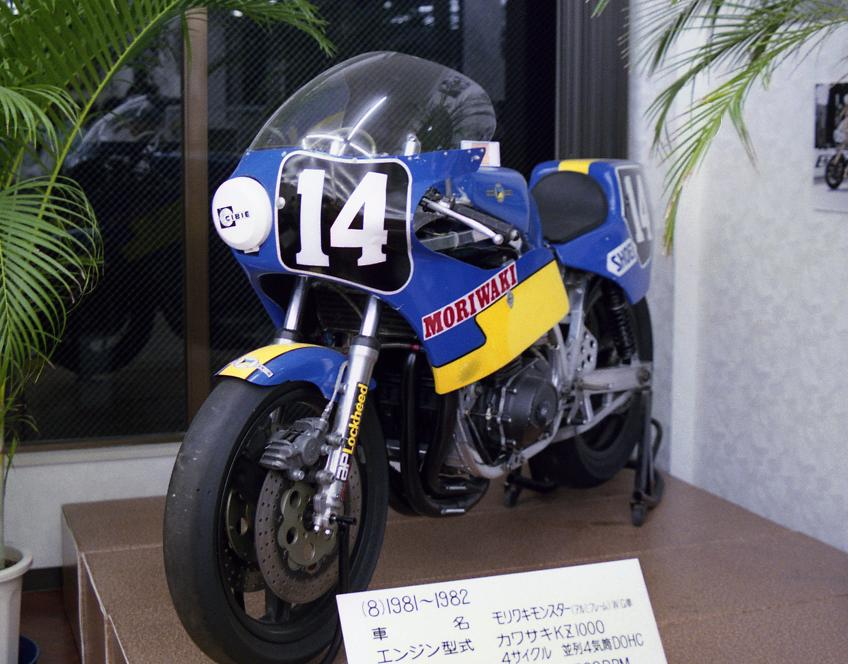
Moriwaki Kawasaki Z1000 ridden by Wayne Gardner in the 1981 Suzuka 8 Hours endurance race

The Z1000 was successfully raced in European, Australian, American and British Superbike racing. A KZ1000 ridden by Reg Pridmore won the AMA Superbike Championship in 1977 and 1978. Pops Yoshimura first began to make his reputation in the mid-1970s by fielding fast, reliable Kawasaki KZ1000s in the AMA Superbike championships. Kawasaki Z1000s tuned by Mamoru Moriwaki were successfully raced in the Australian Superbike championships in the late 1970s by New Zealander Graeme Crosby. John Cowie riding a Z1000 for the Pecket & McNab team, won the 1978 British ACU Formula One championship for production bikes. Freddie Spencer rode a KZ1000 during the 1979 AMA Superbike Championship, winning two races and finishing third in the final championship points standings. Wayne Gardner and co-rider John Pace qualified their Moriwaki-Kawasaki Z1000 on pole position at the prestigious 1981 Suzuka 8 Hours, ahead of all the major factory racing teams. Also in 1981, Eddie Lawson won the AMA Superbike Championship for Kawasaki on a factory-backed KZ1000S1.

== Film and TV appearances ==
The KZ1000C was ridden by California Highway Patrol officers Ponch and Jon of the 1977–1984 TV show CHiPs. A Z1000 also appeared in the 1979 film The Great Riviera Bank Robbery, also known as Sewers of Gold, based on the actual heist which took place in Nice in 1976. In the film Ian McShane plays the lead as Albert Spaggiari, who leaps from a second floor window of a police office and on to the back of a waiting Z1000, which tears away through the streets of Nice (Spaggiari did escape by motorcyle). Years later, former road racer and later mayor of Nice Christian Estrosi was accused of being the getaway driver, which he proved to be false. The Z1000 was also in the anime television series Great Teacher Onizuka, and ridden by Keanu Reeves in the film Chain Reaction. Fourteen of the motorcycles in Mad Max (1979) were Z1000s. The bikes were donated by a local Kawasaki dealer and modified in appearance by Melbourne business La Parisienne; one as a police bike ridden by 'The Goose', and thirteen for members of the Toecutter's gang, played by a real motorcycle club called the Vigilantes. The KZ1000P appeared in the 1991 movie Terminator 2: Judgment Day.
