= AMA Superbike Championship =

American motorcycle racing series

MotoAmerica Superbike Championship
- Category: Superbike racing
- Country: United States
- Inaugural season: 1976
- Riders' champion: Cameron Beaubier
- Makes' champion: BMW
- Teams' champion: BMW M 1000 RR
- Official website: http://www.motoamerica.com

AMA Superbike Championship is an American motorcycle racing series based in the United States. The series is organized by MotoAmerica and is sanctioned by the American Motorcyclist Association (AMA) as well as the Fédération Internationale de Motocyclisme (FIM). For most of its existence it has been considered the premier motorcycle road racing series in the United States. The championship features “highly modified, production based liter class motorcycles” competing at premier tracks across the country.

The AMA Superbike Championship can trace its roots back to the AMA Open Production event that began in 1973. AMA Open Production was hosted alongside the AMA Road Race National at Laguna Seca Raceway in 1973 and 1974. By 1976, the event became a major class, appearing at all 4 AMA Grand Nationals that season, and its name was changed to Superbike Production. In 1986, the AMA made the Grand National Championship into a dirt-track-only series splitting off the road-racing rounds into their own series, the Superbike Production events became the AMA Superbike Championship. In 2015 MotoAmerica became the series organizer, resulting in all AMA Superbike Championship events being held under the MotoAmerica name.

== History ==
In the early 1970’s AMA road racing consisted of two classes of Grand Prix style road racing machines: Heavyweight and Lightweight. The Heavyweight class, akin to Formula 750 in Europe, limited displacement to 750cc; while the Lightweight class limited 2 stroke engine displacement to 250cc and 4 stroke displacement to 360cc. Required by homologation, these motorcycles “must be a standard catalogued production model and at least 200 of this same model with identical engines and transmissions must be available for inspection and/or purchase within the United States”. While they were based on a standard production model, these motorcycles were either purpose built, or highly modified for racing, equipped with high performance engines and aerodynamic bodywork. Commonly the teams racing in these classes were factory backed, and capable of bringing engineering and financial resources unavailable to the common person. By 1974 both the Heavyweight and Lightweight Classes were almost completely dominated by the Yamaha TZ, and fans were becoming tired of the watching the same make and model win two seasons in a row.

=== Open Production (1973 - 1975) ===
The early 1970’s saw the introduction of many high performance, large displacement road bikes such as the BMW R90S, Kawasaki Z1, and the Ducati 750SS. These motorcycles brought unprecedented levels of performance and power to the showroom floor, needing little to no modification to make them competent racing motorcycles. Buyers of these bikes knew this, and were eager to begin competing in races aboard their performance oriented machines. Soon, various club racers were competing in grassroot production based race events across the country.

Sensing the growing desire for production based racing, AMA race promoters Gavin Trippe and Bruce Cox invited production racers to compete at the 1973 Laguna Seca AMA National Road Race Weekend. Two production based races occurred, one being the Open Production class and the other being the Lightweight Production class, which was limited to 350cc. The regulations for these races required the motorcycles to retain their stock appearance, exhaust, brakes, instruments and carburetors. Yvon Duhamel won the first Open Production race, riding a Kawasaki Z1 provided by U.S. Kawasaki factory team. The event proved to be popular with racers and fans alike. Spectators enjoyed watching racing between machines that were available to the public, while racers enjoyed the low barriers of entry for the same reasons.

Other Road Race Nationals began adding Production races to their lineup. In 1974, Open Production returned to Laguna Seca, drawing enough popularity for it to make the cover of Cycle News. Later that season, the Ontario road race national featured an Open Production event, this time won by Reg Pridmore on a BMW R90S. The AMA introduced its first official road racing category for production class motorcycles as a support class in 1975, which served as the precursor to the Superbike Championship. The 1975 season saw both the Daytona Bike Week and Laguna Seca feature Production racing with David Aldana and Yvon Duhamel winning each respectively riding Kawasaki Z1 motorcycles. Duhamel switched to a Kawasaki H2 motorcycle to win the Production Class at the 1975 Pocono National, marking the last time that a two-stroke motorcycle won an AMA production class race.

=== Superbike Production (1976 - 1982) ===
By 1976, the popularity of production racing, particularly around the Open Production class had swelled sufficiently for the AMA to make Open Production an official championship class to be run at all Round of Road Race Nationals. The name Open Production was dropped in favor of Superbike Production. Rules mandated that motorcycles competing in Superbike Production must “retain stock chassis and original silhouette. The engine could be modified as long as it retained the stock stroke - capacity limit was increased to 1000cc - but it must run stock carbs and stock exhausts”.

At the inception of the series there was little competition between the more experienced teams racing European twin cylinder bikes, which included the BMW R90S, Ducati and Moto Guzzi motorcycles and the teams racing the more powerful Japanese inline fours from Kawasaki, Suzuki, and Honda. While the Japanese bikes produced more horsepower, the European bikes tended to have superior handling. "In the beginning, the liter bikes actually lapped slower than the AMA 250s". The power being produced by the modified Japanese four cylinders was easily overcoming the bike's flexible double cradle frames and stock brakes. Since the rules permitted engine modifications, but forbade chassis modification, teams fielding the Japanese four cylinders could do little to address these poor handling characteristics.

The inaugural series in 1976 consisted of four rounds, BMW took three wins and Moto Guzzi took one. The Championship was won by rider Reg Pridmore on a BMW R90S owned by Team Butler and Smith. For 1977 the series was expanded to 7 races and the European machines continued to show their strengths, winning the first four rounds. By the 5th round, after two seasons of work, the Team Racecrafters Kawasaki Z1 won the first race for a Japanese motorcycle. Racecrafters and Reg Pridmore - who changed teams mid season - went on to win the Championship. 1977 also brought the launch of both the Suzuki GS1000 and Kawasaki KZ1000 motorcycles. These bikes were able to take full advantage of the 1000cc displacement limit and resolved some of the handling issues of the earlier models.

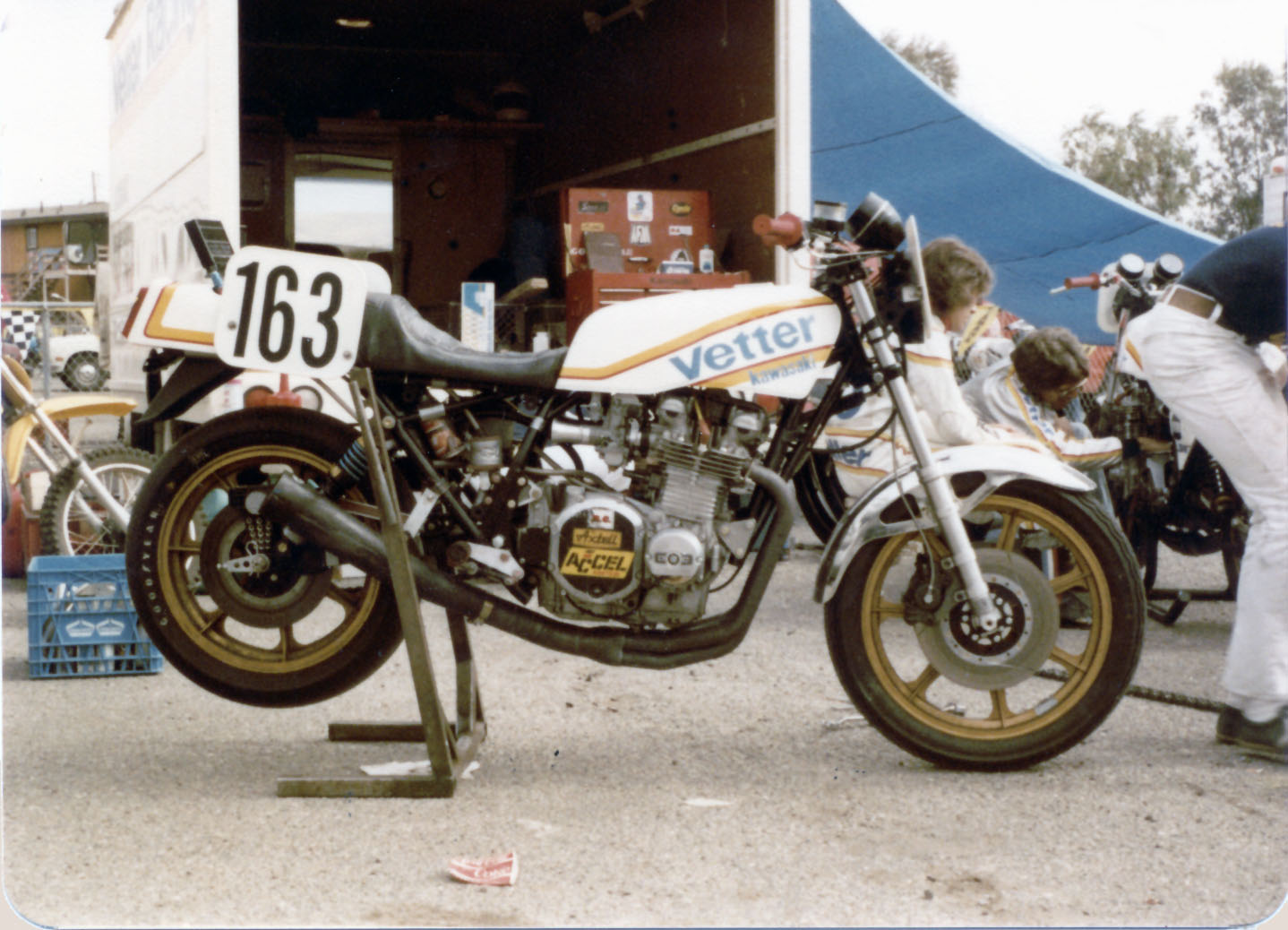
Vetter Kawasaki Superbike team at Sears Point in 1979.

By 1978, Yoshimura Suzuki and Vetter Kawasaki were two of the leading teams taking advantage of the new 1000cc Japanese machines. The 1978 season also brought new rule changes to the series. More extensive modifications, such as aftermarket 4-1 exhausts were allowed. Fierce competition between Suzuki, Ducati, Kawasaki and BMW continued, with the Championship again going to Reg Pridmore, this time riding a Vetter Kawasaki KZ1000. Superbike Production saw more changes in 1979 for both the motorcycles and race format. Racing carburetors were now allowed, marking another step away from the production origins as teams sought to make their bikes more competitive. The Daytona round, previously a 50 mile race distance, was extended to 100 miles, and allowed a refueling pitstop. Yoshimura Suzuki, which had seen success in prior seasons, went on to win the 1979 Championship with rider Wes Cooley.

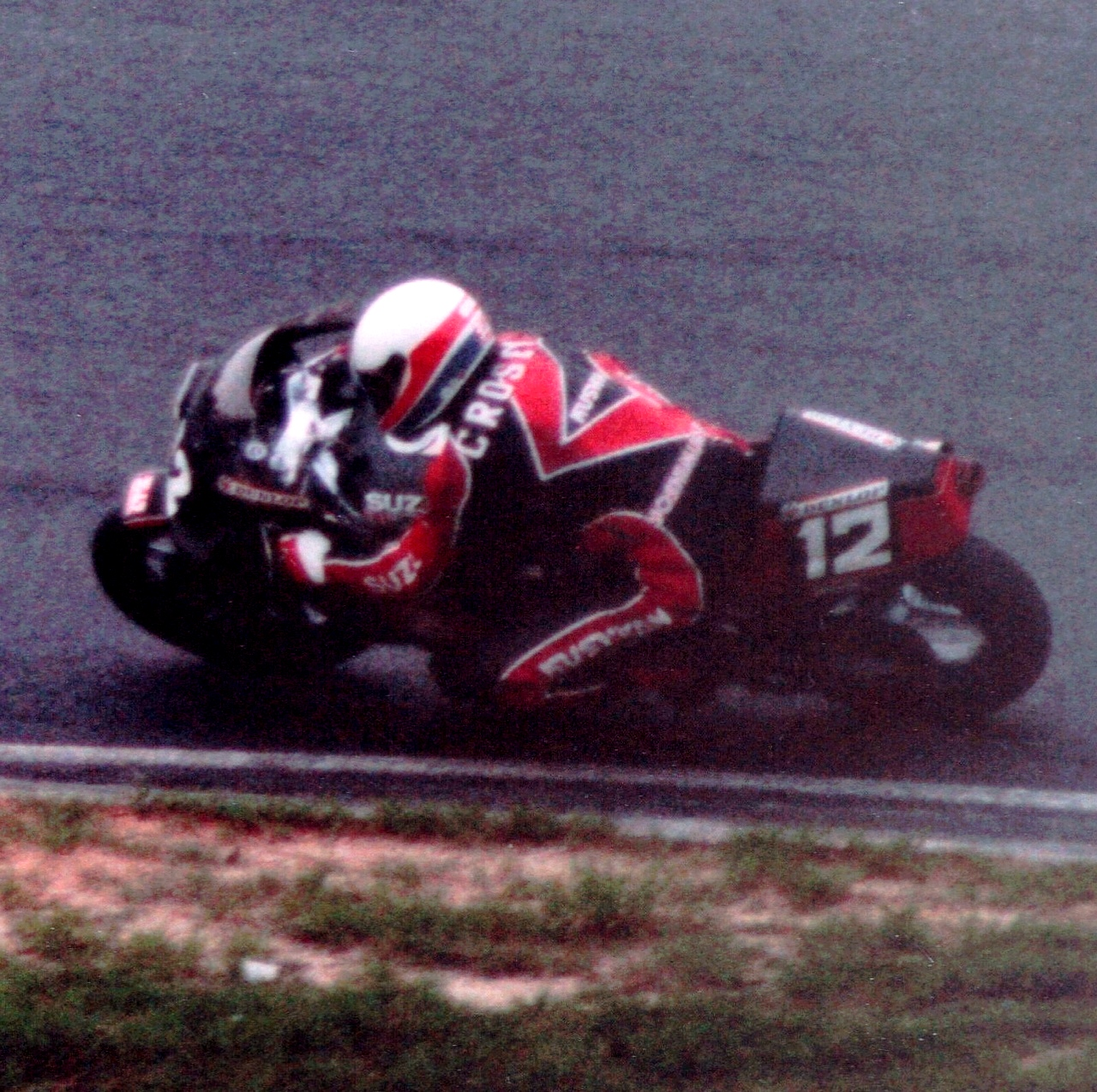
Graeme Crosby riding for Yoshimura Suzuki

As the series gained more and more attention in America the factories took note. In 1980 Honda entered the series with a factory team and brought a top rider from their stable, Freddie Spencer, to compete on their behalf. The Kawasaki factory team, which began in 1979, hired Rob Muzzy, an experienced dirt track mechanic to build their engines, and eventually the entire bike. The engine displacement limit was increased to 1025cc, likely to accommodate the stock displacement of the Kawasaki KZ1000. Despite the best efforts of the Honda and Kawasaki factory teams, Yoshimura Suzuki and rider Wes Cooley continued their success and won the Championship in 1980. By 1981, the Kawasaki factory team had refined their KZ1000 and entered a period of success, winning the 1981 and 1982 Championships with rider Eddie Lawson.

=== The 750cc Era & The Homologation Specials (1983 - 2002) ===
By 1982, the 1000cc four cylinder motorcycles were producing up to 150 horsepower. Despite some improvement over the early years, the power and speed of the bikes were still overwhelming their chassis, brakes and tires, generating real concern for rider safety. Thus for 1983, the AMA, working with the top teams, decided to reduce the displacement limit for four cylinder motorcycles down to 750cc. Two cylinder motorcycles were allowed to retain the 1000cc displacement limit.

Honda, which had been competing in the series with bored out versions of the CB 750, came prepared for this rule change with new technologically advanced motorcycle, designed to win the AMA Superbike Championship. This bike, the VF750F, was a large departure from the air-cooled, perimeter frame, twin shock motorcycles that had won in prior years. Its chassis featured a square tube steel perimeter frame which wrapped around the outside of the engine and monoshock rear suspension. It was powered by a liquid cooled V4 engine, with four valves per cylinder, dual overhead camshafts and a slipper clutch. Where the original Japanese 4 cylinder bikes became race machines from production origins, the VF750F was a bike specifically built for racing in mind, and marked the beginning of a period of great technological advancement.

Honda did not experience immediate success with the VF750F. The 1983 Championship began with Wayne Rainey winning the inaugural race on Team Muzzy Kawasaki GPz750. The GPz750 was regarded as a low tech machine at the time, itself based on the KZ750. Honda went on to win the next 5 races of the 14 race series that year. Despite this, the experience the Kawasaki team had from winning the Championships the previous two years, along with the talent of rider Wayne Rainey, allowed them to come back and secure a third consecutive Championship in 1983, defeating Honda’s VF750F.

As the popularity of the series grew the long established Daytona 200 motorcycle race, which had begun on a course constructed on the beach in 1935, and had moved to the asphalt auto-racing track in 1961, became a Superbike event in 1985. The event had been one of the few venues where FIM style Formula 1 500cc machines raced in the United States, but the speeds the machines were reaching on the high-banked tracks were deemed unsafe given the tire technology of the time. This increased the visibility of Superbikes even further, and cemented in the minds of many Americans that the Superbikes were now the de facto premier motorcycle racers in the United States.

In 1986, the AMA recognized the changing nature and increasing popularity of motorcycle road racing, and split the road racing series into their own championship. This made the Grand National Championship into a dirt-track-only series. The newly formed road racing championship consisted of only two classes; Formula 1 and Superbike.

Despite not winning its debut 750cc season, the mid 1980s marked a period of unprecedented success for Honda. With the VF750F, and its evolutions, the VFR750F and the VFR750R (RC30), Honda won the AMA Superbike championship 5 years in a row starting in 1984. Rider Fred Merkel won three of these Championships while Wayne Rainey and Bubba Shobert each won one. This success was not without competition as other manufacturers began to produce their own heavily racing oriented machines. 1985 saw the introduction of both the Suzuki GSX-R750 and Yamaha FZ750, two motorcycles with technology to match the VF750F.

In the latter years of the 1980’s, Yoshimura Suzuki with the ever evolving GSX-R750 was able to slowly chip away Hondas advantage. By the 1987 and 1988 seasons, Suzuki was winning more races than Honda. This increased success culminated in the 1989 season with Yoshimura Suzuki winning the Championship with rider Jamie James.

Production based superbike racing hit the world stage in 1988 with the first season of the Superbike World Championship. Inspired by the popularity of production based racing in the United States, World Superbike experienced great success for many of the same reasons AMA Superbike was successful. Fans enjoyed watching racing on motorcycles that were accessible to them. The introduction of this series heightened manufacturers' interest in production based racing and brought about the concept of the “homologation special”. These motorcycles were produced specifically for racing and were sold in very low numbers at a high cost. Typically only enough were manufactured and sold to meet the homologation requirements, proving that they were indeed a “production” model. Examples of these early homologation specials include the Ducati 851 and the Honda RC30. Homologation specials quickly made their way to the United States to begin racing in the AMA Superbike championship.

The 1989 season also saw the return of Team Muzzy Kawasaki fielding the then new ZX-7. Kawasaki was the last of the Japanese manufacturers to release a new 750cc superbike, but the new ZX-7 proved to be a serious contender in its first year, winning 2 of the 6 rounds that season. By 1990, Team Muzzy having sorted out all of the problems with their new platform, won 4 of the 8 rounds and took home the Championship with rider Doug Chandler. 1990 was also the year that the Vance & Hines team partnered with Yamaha to become their official AMA road race team. Fielding Yamaha’s homologation special, the FZR750R (OW01), the team won the Daytona 200 in their debut season. Vance & Hines saw limited success for the rest of the 1990 season, but went on to win the 1991 Championship - Yamaha's first - with rider Thomas Stevens. Team Muzzy Kawasaki remained competitive in 1991, winning 4 of the 8 races but failing to have the consistency of the Vance & Hines team.

The following season, Team Muzzy, now armed with the more potent ZX-7R, Kawasaki’s homologation version of the ZX-7, won the 1992 Championship with Scott Russel taking 3 wins in the 8 race season. Team Muzzy experienced heavy competition from Doug Polen and the Fast by Ferracci Ducati team fielding the Ducati 888. Fast by Ferracci went on to be the most dominant team in the 1993 season, with Doug Polen winning 6 of the 10 races. Team Muzzy was urged by Kawasaki to focus their 1993 efforts on the Superbike World Championship. This resulted in Scott Russel missing out on half of the season and the Team Muzzy being unable to defend their title. Fast by Ferracci’s 1993 season marked the first ever Championship for Ducati and the first for a European team in 17 years. Fast by Ferracci continued their success into 1994 taking the Championship with Australian rider Troy Corser.

Honda and Ducati both introduced new models in 1994 that would elevate their competitive advantage. The Honda RC45 and Ducati 916 can both be viewed as evolutions of the successful racing motorcycles that preceded them, the RC30 and 888 respectively. The RC45 was fielded by the Smokin’ Joe’s Honda team in 1994 while Fast by Ferracci chose to wait until 1995 to introduce the 916. Honda, now with rider Doug Polen chose to focus their 1994 efforts on World Superbike, and it wasn't until 1995 with rider Miguel Duhamel, that the Smokin’ Joe’s team became competitive. Winning 8 of the 10 races that season, the Honda RC45 proved a capable machine and Miguel Duhamel became the first and only Canadian to win an AMA Superbike Championship.

With the new and improved 1996 Kawasaki ZX-7RR, Team Muzzy came back to win both the 1996 and 1997 Championships with Doug Chandler. With these wins, Doug Chandler joined only Reg Pridmore and Fred Merkel to have won three AMA Superbike Championship titles at the time. The 1996 and 1997 seasons were highly contested with Team Muzzy winning the championship despite taking 1st place in only 2 and 1 races respectively. Honda continued to develop their RC45 and by 1998, with the bike producing a claimed 180 horsepower, they came back to win the Championship with rider Ben Bostrom.

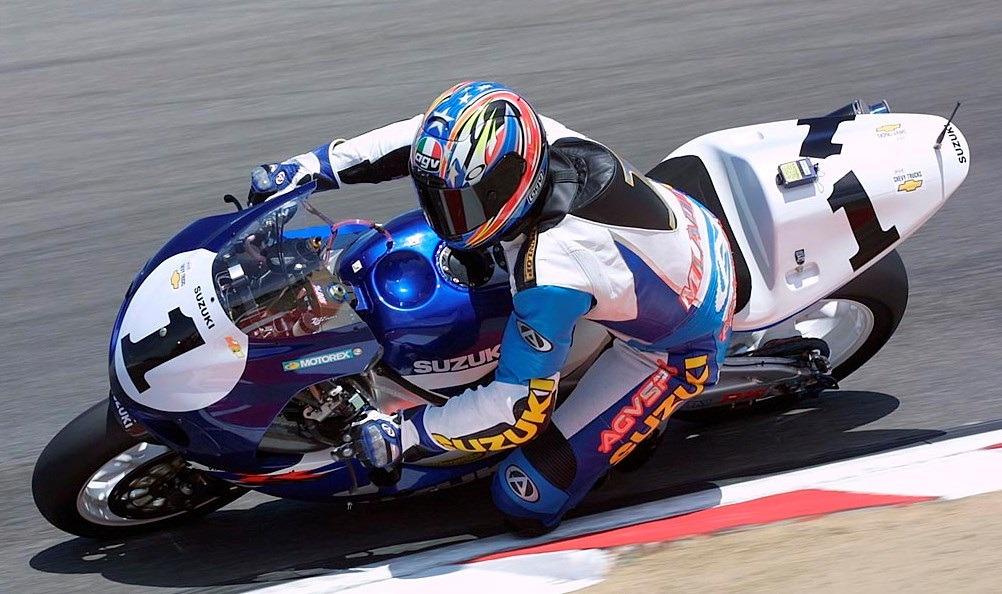
Mat Mladin riding his Yoshimura Suzuki GSX-R750 in 2002

Like Kawasaki, Suzuki had also released a completely new version of their 750cc sportbike, the GSX-R750 for 1996. Slowly gaining experience with the new machine in 1997 and 1998 seasons, team Yoshimura Suzuki went on to win three consecutive championships from 1999 to 2001. All three were won by Australian rider Mat Mladin and he became only the 4th rider to have won three titles.

The 1990s were a period of tremendous growth for AMA Superbike, and superbike racing as a whole. Throughout the decade, the popularity of the series grew and by the mid 90’s, the entire series was televised. Manufacturer involvement was at an all time high, with several companies producing motorcycles specifically for the purpose of superbike racing. These homologation special motorcycles helped develop technology such as fuel injection, onboard data logging and single sided swingarms that would go on to impact motorcycle technology throughout the 21st century.

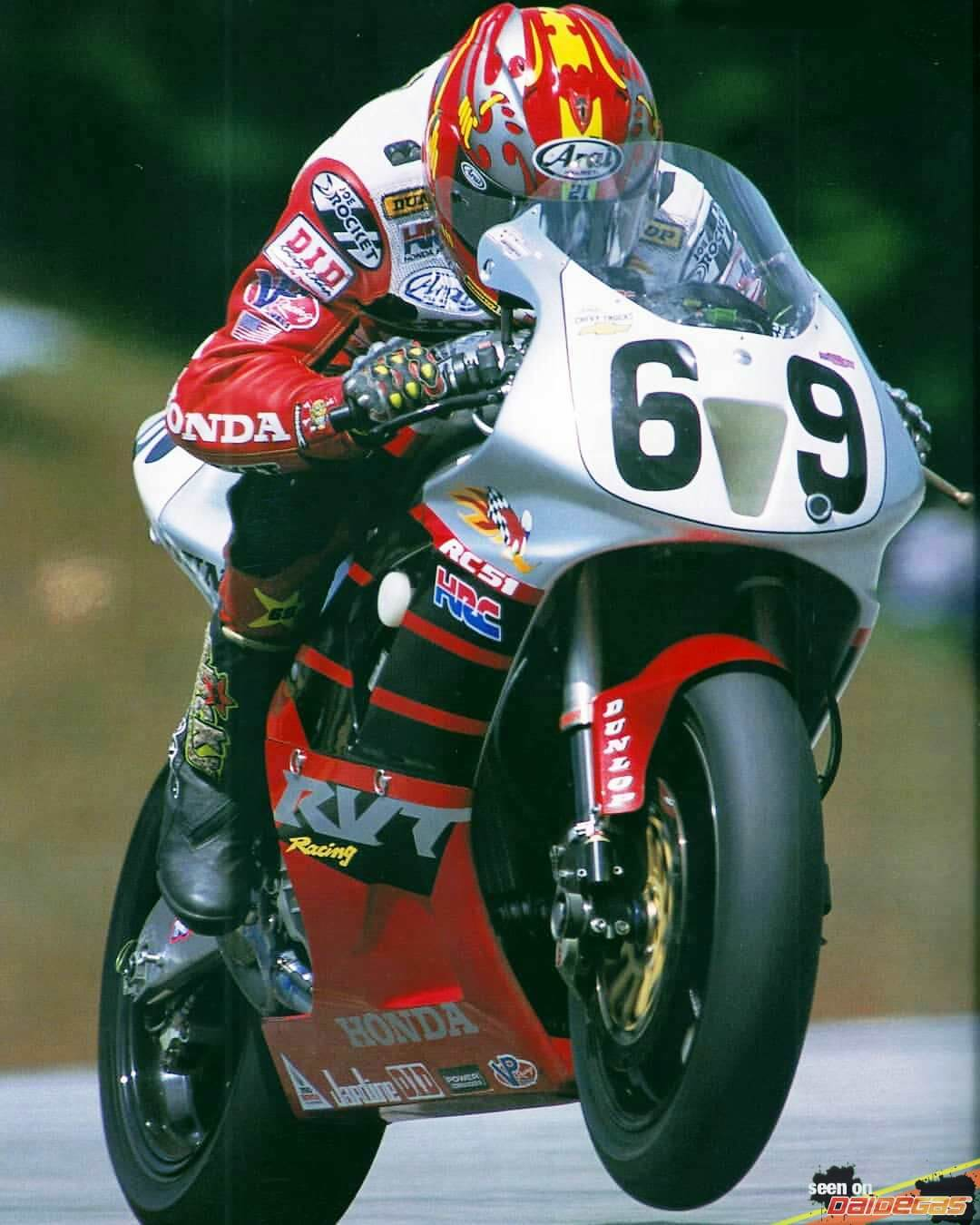
Nicky Hayden riding a Honda RC51 superbike

AMA Superbike throughout 1990’s was highly competitive, with 5 different manufacturers and 8 different riders winning Championships. The same could not be said for World Superbike, where Ducati won the Championship every year except for 1993 and 1997. The rules in World Superbike, similar to those established by AMA Superbike, permitted two cylinder engines to displace up to 1000cc. By the late 1980’s Ducati had developed their L twin engines to produce equivalent, if not more power than the 750cc four cylinder bikes. This, combined with the packaging and aerodynamic benefits offered by the narrower engines, gave two cylinder machines a significant advantage in superbike racing. As the decade progressed, Honda and Suzuki had become aware of this performance advantage and developed their own two cylinder motorcycles to compete. These were the Honda RC51 and the Suzuki TL1000R. The American Honda team, fielding the RC51, won several races in the 2000 and 2001 seasons with riders Miguel Duhamel and Nicky Hayden. By 2002, Honda released an updated version of the RC51, and with this bike, Nicky Hayden went on to win the 2002 championship, becoming the youngest ever rider to win the AMA Superbike Championship, accomplishing the feat at 21 years old.

=== Return of The Liter Bikes (2003 - 2008) ===
By the early 2000s, it became clear that the motorcycles being raced in AMA Superbike no longer represented the grassroots style production based racing the series was founded around. Manufacturers were developing purpose-built racing motorcycles that were produced in such low quantities that they were essentially unavailable to the public. Factory backed teams were competing with large budgets and the series was becoming less accessible to privateer teams. By 2002, “a privateer had not finished on the podium of an AMA Superbike race in seven years”.

AMA recognized the inaccessibility of the series and brought about a large rule change for the 2003 season designed to address this situation. Now eligible to compete were near stock, 1000cc multi cylinder motorcycles with “specific restrictions on weight and engine modifications”. These 1000cc motorcycles had a higher minimum required weight of 370 pounds, and were permitted far fewer performance modifications than the existing 750cc machines. The extensively modified 750cc multi cylinder “homologation special” bikes of the prior season were allowed to remain, and their maximum displacement was increased to 800cc to keep them competitive. Also still permitted were the 1000cc twin cylinder bikes, held to the same 355 pound minimum weight requirement as the 750, now 800cc bikes.

The Japanese manufacturers were prepared for the inclusion of 1000cc four cylinder motorcycles in 2003. Yamaha had launched their YZR-R1 in 1998, Honda their CBR954RR in 2002, and Suzuki their GSX-R1000 in 2001. These motorcycles were not homologation specials, and were available to the public en masse. Although they were not produced in minimal quantities, they all packed serious technology derived from the 750cc racing motorcycles that preceded them. With minimal modification, these “liter” bikes were capable of performance very close to the homologation specials fielded by the factory teams. As a result, smaller privateer teams could run a liter bike in AMA Superbike and be competitive on a much smaller budget.

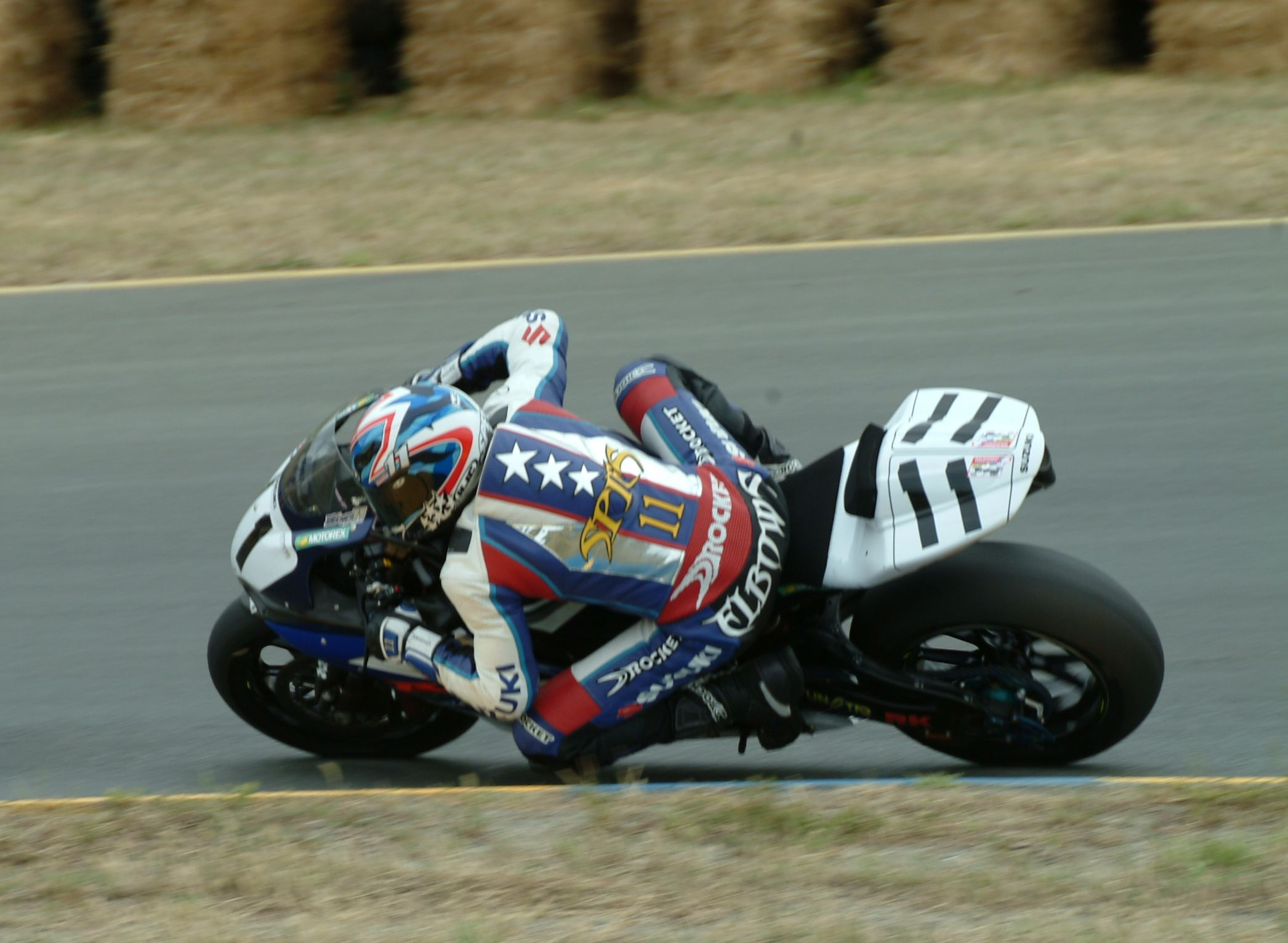
Ben Spies riding the 2005 Yoshimura Suzuki GSX-R1000 at Sears Point

For 2003, Kawasaki continued to field their bored out ZX-7RR, and Honda their twin cylinder RC51, but as the season went on, it became evident that the liter bikes had the advantage. By 2004, Honda chose to field their new CBR1000RR four cylinder; similarly, Kawasaki moved to their newly released ZX-10R. It was the Suzuki GSX-R1000 that emerged as the clear recipe for success after this rule change went into effect. Fifty nine of the seventy three entrants in the 2003 season were riding Suzukis. The Yoshimura Suzuki team switched to the GSX-R1000 for the 2003 season and went on to win the Championship that year. This began a period of unprecedented success for a team competing in AMA Superbike. Yoshimura Suzuki went on to win 7 consecutive championships from 2003 to 2009, four with Matt Mladin and three with Ben Spies. Mat Mladin’s 2009 Championship cemented him as the rider with the most AMA Superbike Championships, winning seven.

Ultimately this new ruleset was not liked by all competitors. In 2006 Ducati withdrew factory support from AMA Superbike racing, claiming that the rules were unfavorable for their two cylinder motorcycles. Overall participation in AMA Superbike steadily fell after this rule change, going from roughly 50 entrants per race in 2004 to 27 per race in 2008.

=== Daytona Motorsports Group (2009 - 2014) ===
In March 2008, Rob Dingman, the CEO of AMA announced that he was selling the sanctioning, promotional and management rights of AMA Pro Racing to the Daytona Motorsports Group. The leadership of AMA at the time wanted to distance themselves from their racing activities to focus on being a membership organization and providing membership benefits. Rob Dingman claimed that the AMA was facing too much controversy as the sanctioning body for the racing series and that they needed to return to their core values. To accomplish this, the AMA searched for a partner to handle all of the commercial aspects of their racing series. Eventually they chose the Daytona Motorsports Group (DMG) led by Jim France, the CEO of NASCAR and Roger Edmonson, President of the Grand American Road Race Series. The Superbike Championship would continue to be run under the AMA name to retain its legacy and public recognition. Hopes were high that the new ties to NASCAR would bring an influx of money and publicity to the AMA road racing series. For 2009, rule changes were put into effect to allow twin cylinder bikes up to 1200cc. This mirrored the rule change made in World Superbike to allow Ducati to be competitive with their 1098R.

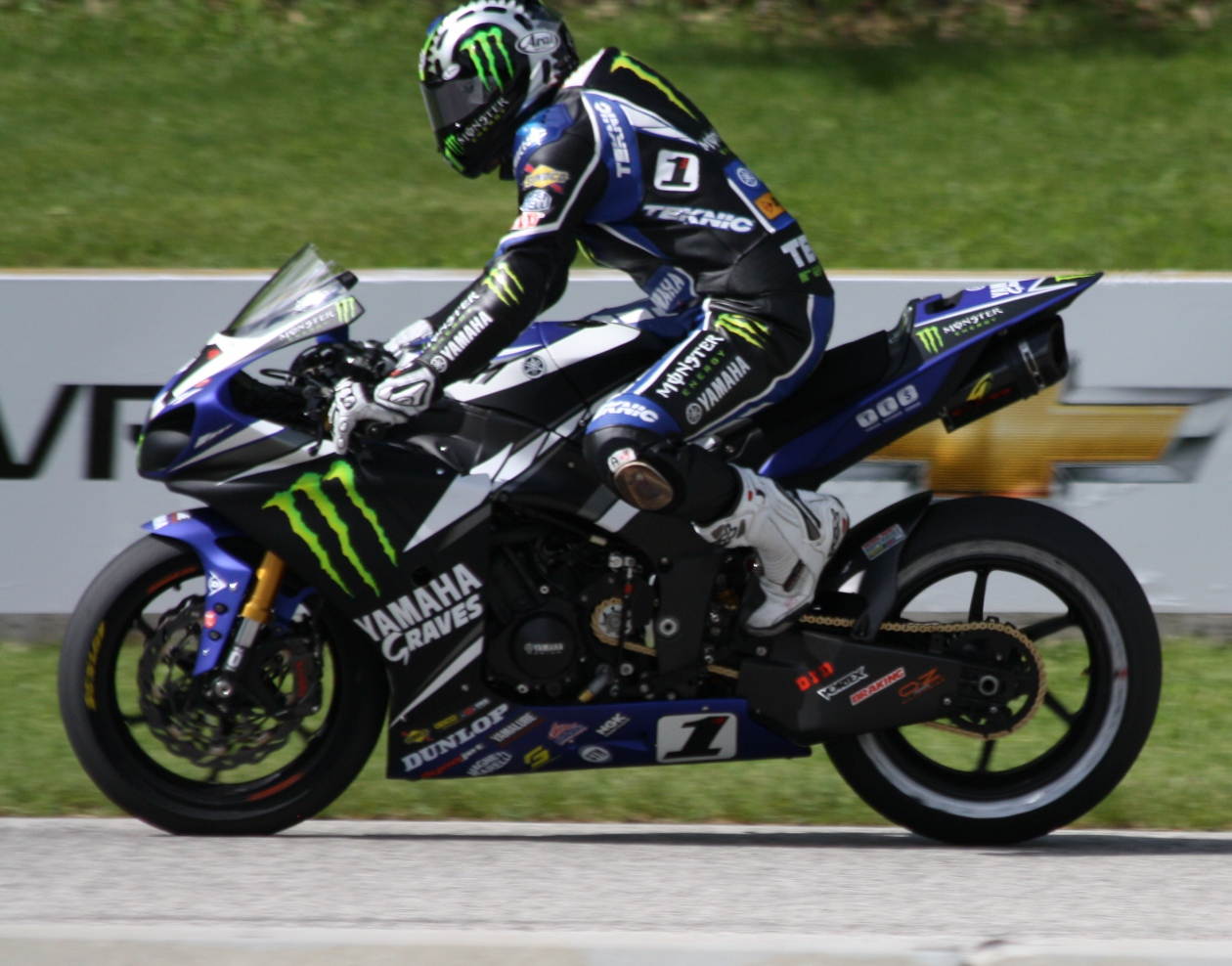
Josh Hayes riding a Yamaha Factory YZF-R1 in 2013

Unfortunately, the leadership at DMG ended up doing a poor job operating and marketing the series, and the timing of the 2008 financial crisis did not help matters. The Honda and Kawasaki factory teams dropped out of the 2009 season, leaving just Suzuki and Yamaha to field factory supported teams. With this loss of this manufacturer support, many sponsors and fans left the sport as well. The number of races per season was cut in half, going from twelve in 2009 to six in 2014 with even fewer receiving television coverage. Despite some intermittent factory involvement from BMW and KTM, the number of entrants per race continued to fall, with only 15 motorcycles competing at Road America in 2014.

Nonetheless, the superbike racing continued and the Yamaha Factory Racing Team, fielding their YZF-R1 defined this period. Matching the level of success seen by Suzuki prior to the DMG acquisition, Yamaha won the Championship every year from 2010 to 2016. Four of these 7 titles were won by rider Josh Hayes, two by Cameron Beaubier, and one by Josh Herrin.

=== MotoAmerica & FIM alignment (2015 - Present) ===
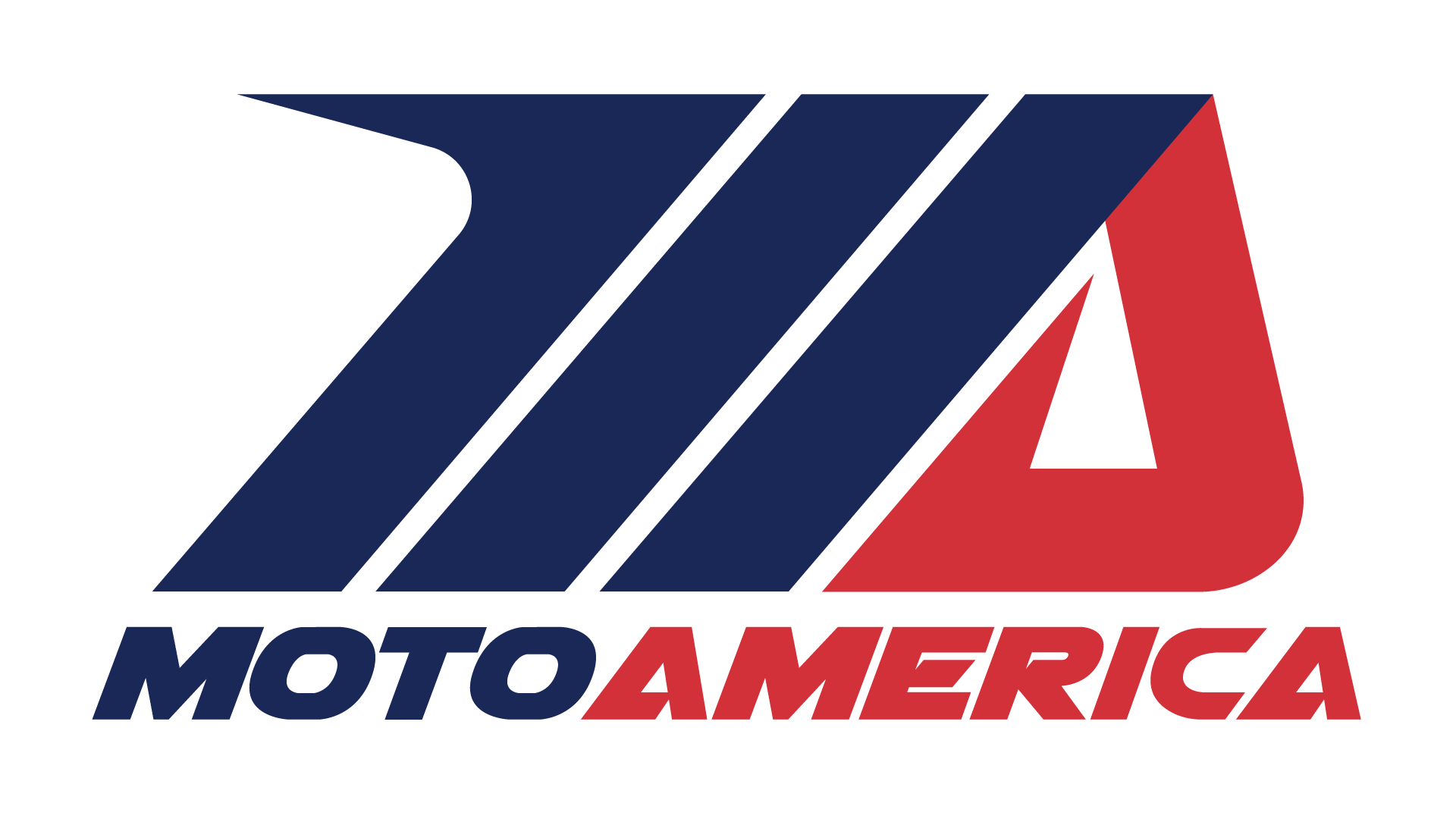
MotoAmerica Logo

In 2014 it was announced that MotoAmerica, an affiliate of the KRAVE Group, was going to purchase the commercial rights to AMA road racing. The KRAVE Group, which consists of Wayne Rainey, Chuck Aksland, Terry Karges, and Richard Varner, approached the AMA in 2013 with an intent to purchase the commercial rights to the series. Through “complicated” negotiations, the AMA reacquired the sanctioning rights to all AMA road racing series from the Daytona Motorsports Group, and sold the commercial rights to KRAVE. With the shared goal of revitalizing the U.S. road racing, the AMA re-established itself as the sanctioning body and entrusted “the promoting and commercial rights for professional racing to a talented, dedicated, well-capitalized professional entity”.

MotoAmerica, in consultation with the AMA, chose to align the multiple racing classes closely with those used by FIM, which simplifies the work that manufacturers must do to compete in both series. Superbike was to remain the premier class with the rules surrounding the chassis remaining as is, and the engine regulations closely adhering to the 2015 World Superbike engine rules.

Motoamerica expanded road racing into a 10 race series, seeing superbike racing return to many of the fans' favorite tracks from the past. Importantly, MotoAmerica has established television broadcasting agreements with FOX Sports and NBC Sports, in addition to live streaming on Youtube and Motoamerica+. With these moves, AMA Superbike racing has had race entrants increase, and seen combined viewership total 1.9 million for one round of the series. The increase in popularity of the series has attracted manufacturers back as well, with Ducati and Honda rejoining longtime factory supporters Suzuki and Yamaha.

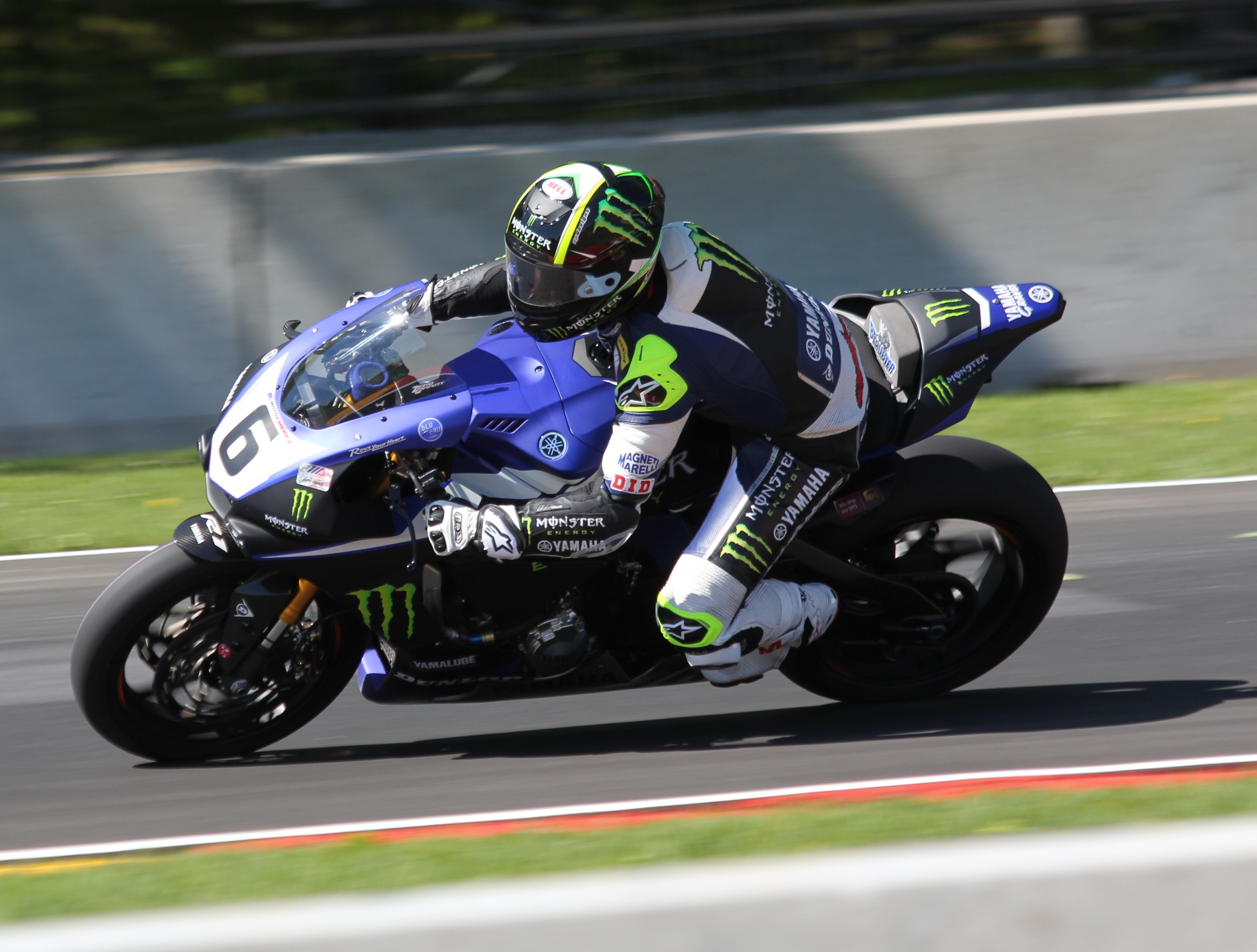
Cameron Beaubier riding a Yamaha Factory YZF-R1 in 2015

The Yamaha Factory Racing team continued its success seen in the DMG era, winning the first two MotoAmerica run Superbike Championships in 2015 and 2016. Yoshimura Suzuki, won the 2017 Championship with Spanish rider Toni Elías, the first ever Spanish rider to win an AMA Superbike Championship. Yamaha retook the Championship in 2018, and went on win six consecutive championships through 2023, three with rider Cameron Beaubier and three with Jake Gagne. Cameron Beaubier's 2020 Championship was his 5th, making him the rider with the second most AMA Superbike Championships, only behind Mat Mladin who has seven.

With factory support from Ducati, the Warhorse HSBK Ducati team won the 2024 AMA Superbike Championship with rider Josh Herrin. This ended Yamaha's six year win streak, and was Ducati’s first AMA Superbike Championship since 1994.

== Current Regulations ==
Motorcycles competing in AMA Superbike must follow the requirements of the FIM homologation rules and must appear on the FIM North America homologated motorcycle list. General regulations are as follows:

Minimum Weight: 370 pounds

Engine:

- Normally Aspirated four stroke
- 3 and 4 cylinder engines over 750cc, up to 1000cc
- 2 cylinder engines over 850cc, up to 1200cc
- The displacement capacity (bore and stroke) must remain at the homologated size.

== Event Format ==
The AMA Superbike season typically consists of 9-10 rounds, each with two races, held from April through September. Occasionally, there will be three Superbike races held at some of the rounds, with two races instead of one being held on the Sunday. Each round begins on Friday and ends on Sunday:

Day	Morning	Afternoon
Friday	Practice Session (40 minutes)	Qualifying Session for Race 1 (40 minutes)
Saturday	Qualifying Session for Race 2 (40 minutes)	Race 1
Sunday	Warmup Session (15 minutes)	Race 2

Current AMA Superbike races typically range in distance from 40 to 50 miles. Depending on the track, the number of laps can be as few as 12 or as many as 21. Riders have two sessions to qualify for Race 1, one on Friday and one on Saturday morning. The lap times set in these qualifying sessions determines the starting order for Race 1. The starting order for Race 2 is determined by the finishing order of Race 1. If a third race is scheduled for a round, its starting order is determined by the finishing order of Race 2.

=== Scoring System ===
Points are earned at each of the races in the round, and accumulated throughout the season. At the end of the season the rider with the most points wins the Championship. The points allocation is as follows:

Position	1	2	3	4	5	6	7	8	9	10	11	12	13	14	15
Points	25	20	16	13	11	10	9	8	7	6	5	4	3	2	1

No points are earned for finishing a race in position 16 or higher.

== Circuits ==
AMA Superbike Championship circuits as of 2025.
Red dots: Current circuits
Orange dots: Recently visited circuits
Blue dots: Former circuits

The following circuits have hosted an AMA Superbike Championship round within the past 5 years:

- Barber Motorsports Park (Leeds, Alabama)
- Michelin Raceway Road Atlanta (Braselton, Georgia)
- Brainerd International Raceway (Brainerd, Minnesota)
- Pittsburgh International Race Complex (Wampum, Pennsylvania)
- Road America (Elkhart Lake, Wisconsin)
- Ridge Motorsports Park (Shelton, Washington)
- Weathertech Raceway Laguna Seca (Salinas, California)
- Virginia International Raceway (Alton, Virginia)
- Mid-Ohio Sports Car Course (Lexington, Ohio)
- Circuit of the Americas (Del Valle, Texas)
- New Jersey Motorsports Park (Millville, New Jersey)

== See also ==
- List of AMA Superbike champions
- AMA Pro Daytona Sportbike Championship
- AMA Supersport Championship
