= Keith Code =

American motorcycle racer

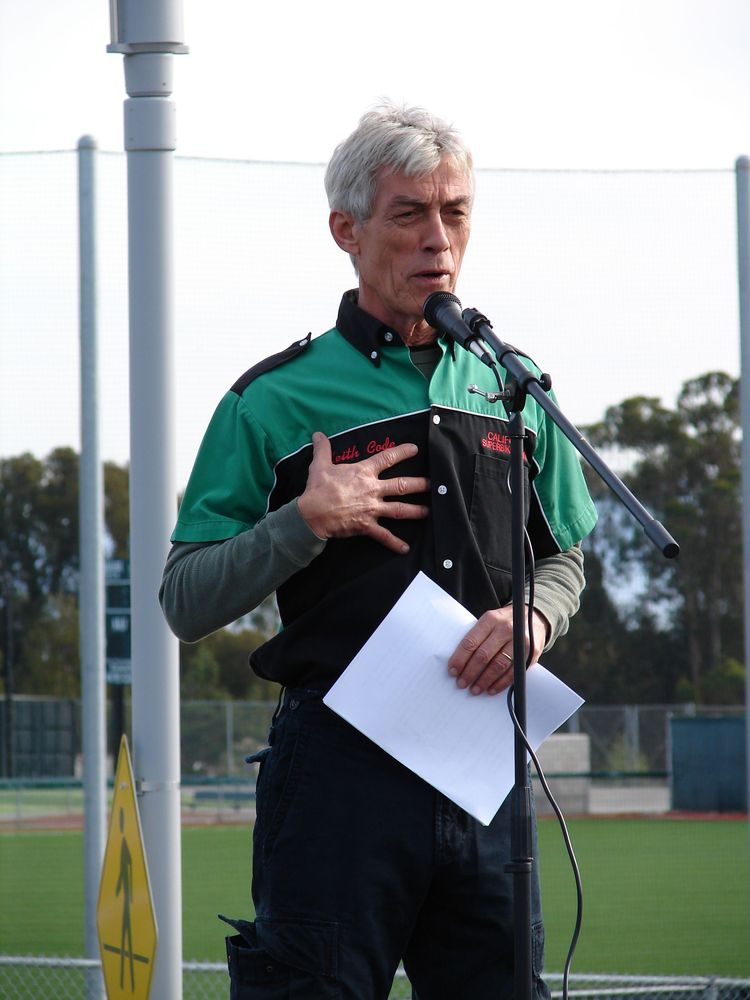
- Occupations: Motorcycle racer, instructor and writer
- Organization: California Superbike School

Keith Code is an American former motorcycle racer, writer, and founder of the California Superbike School. He has been called "arguably the best known and most successful on-track motorcycle instructor in the world".

== Rider training ==
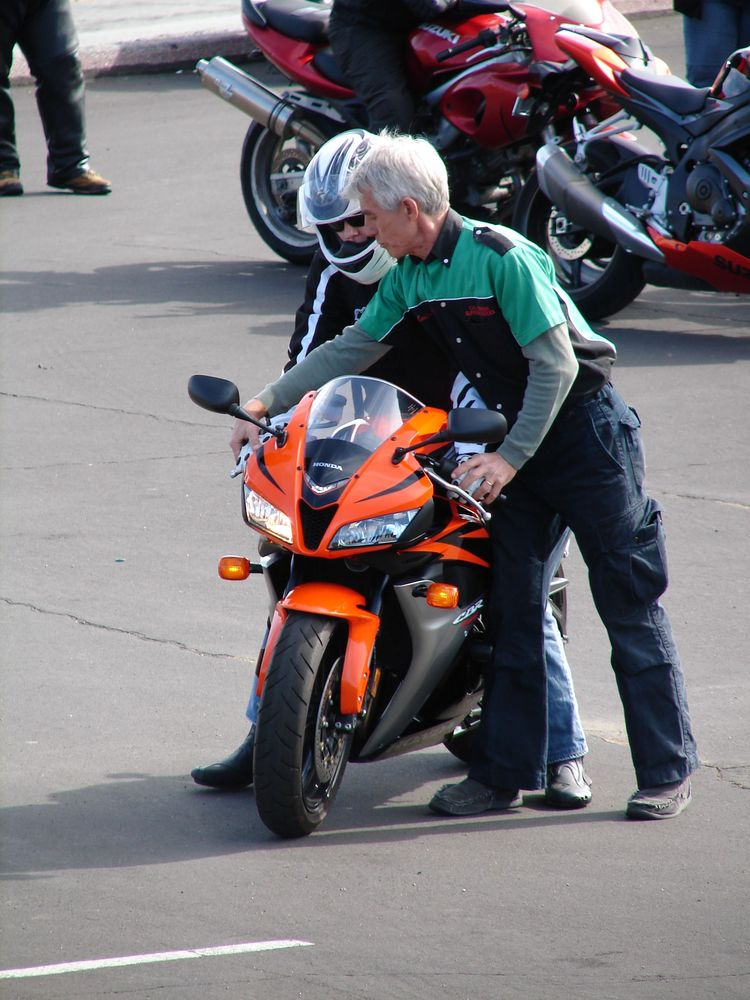
Code coaching a rider

Code founded the California Superbike School in 1980. Code's methodology has been taught to numerous championship winning riders such as Wayne Rainey, James Toseland and Leon Camier. As of 2019, riders who have been trained either at his schools or by him personally have won 60 world and national racing championships. His teaching has been spread all over the world. His California Superbike Schools have operated at over 90 tracks worldwide in 15 countries and have trained 150,000 riders.

In 2006. Code was tasked by the United States Marine Corps to design a rider training program that would be effective in reducing serious motorcycle accidents among USMC riders. The program, called Advanced Motorcycle Operator School, is now considered the gold standard of rider training by Marine safety personnel due to its graduates' extraordinary safety record over a four-year period.

Code has invented rider training devices such as the No Body Steering Bike which illustrates the necessity for counter-steering to be used, the Lean and Slide Bike Trainers that train not only good body positioning and visual skills but also allow riders to experience sliding the machine with much reduced possibility of crashing, and the Panic Braking Trainer that allows riders to experience front wheel lock up and learn how to recover from it.

== Writing ==
Code wrote a monthly column in Motorcyclist magazine called Code Break. He has also opened a specialized school for racing techniques, called Code R.A.C.E. He has written three books about sportsbike riding and racing techniques, and also one feature length DVD covering the content of his second A Twist of the Wrist book. His works have been translated into Russian, German, Estonian, Greek, Spanish, French, Italian, Japanese, Polish, Dutch and Turkish.

== Personal life ==
Keith Code practices Scientology, and the Church of Scientology has quoted him:

Well, I didn't have an occupation. At the time, my idea toward life was to see how little I could do and basically how much and how many kinds of drugs I could take. I wasn't doing anything with my life. When I got into Scientology a lot changed right away. For the first time ever, I saw that there was hope and that was very encouraging. When I received Scientology counseling to handle my drug problem, my life started going up and up and up and hasn't stopped since.

— Keith Code

== Works ==
- Code, Keith (1983). Twist of the Wrist: The Motorcycle Roadracers Handbook. USA: Code Break. ISBN 9780965045018.
- Code, Keith (1997). A Twist of the Wrist 2: The Basics of High-Performance Motorcycle Riding. USA: Code Break. ISBN 0-9650450-2-1.
- Code, Keith; David Gordon (1998). A Gear Higher: The Bicycle Racer's Handbook of Techniques. USA: Haynes Publishing. ISBN 0-9650450-0-5.
- Code, Keith (1998). Soft Science of Roadracing Motorcycles: The Technical Procedures and Workbook for Roadracing Motorcycles. USA: Code Break. ISBN 0-9650450-3-X.
- Ibbott, Andy; Keith Code (2006). Performance Riding Techniques: The MotoGP manual of track riding skills. USA: Haynes Publishing. ISBN 1-84425-343-0.
