= Rob Muzzy =

American motorcycle racing team manager

Robert William Muzzy is an American owner of Muzzy's Performance Products, a specialty engineering company that designs, manufactures and sells high performance parts for motorcycles. He is also a successful motorcycle racing team owner, winning national and international championships in motorcycle road racing and drag racing. His contributions to motorcycle racing resulted in his induction into the AMA Motorcycle Hall of Fame.

== Motorcycle career ==
Muzzy began his motorcycle career during the 1950s when he competed in drag racing and dirt track racing in Southern California. After his competitive riding career, he was hired by Kawasaki as a mechanic in the 1970s. Muzzy built and tuned motorcycle engines for Kawasaki teams that won AMA Superbike Championships in 1981, 1982 and 1983 with riders Eddie Lawson and Wayne Rainey. In 1984, Kawasaki disbanded their racing team and, Muzzy was hired to be the crew chief for the Honda racing team, tuning motorcycles that won the 1984 AMA Grand National Championship, the 1985 125cc AMA National Motocross Championship, the 1986 Daytona 200 and the 1987 AMA Superbike Championship.

In 1988, Muzzy opened his own business in Bend, Oregon, producing engines and exhaust systems for motorcycle racers. He formed a racing team in 1990 using Kawasaki motorcycles with support from the Kawasaki factory. In his first year as a team owner, his riders, Doug Chandler and Scott Russell finished first and second in the 1990 AMA Superbike Championship. The Kawasaki factory then asked Muzzy's team to compete in the World Superbike Championship. The height of his team's success came in 1993 when Muzzy Kawasaki riders Scott Russell and Aaron Slight won the Suzuka 8 Hours race in Japan. Russell then won the 1993 Superbike World Championship for the Muzzy Kawasaki team. In the United States, Miguel Duhamel won the 1993 AMA Supersport Championship.

After his success in international competition, Muzzy returned to the United States to focus on racing in the AMA Superbike Championship. Muzzy's team won two consecutive Daytona 200 races in 1994 and 1995 with rider Scott Russell. Doug Chandler returned to the team in 1996 and won two consecutive AMA Superbike Championships in 1996 and 1997. In 2000, The Muzzy team shifted their focus into motorcycle drag racing with riders Rickey Gadson and Ryan Schnitz winning several major AMA and NHRA titles.

Over his motorsports career, Muzzy has won 21 AMA National Championships in Superbike, Supersport, Drag Racing, Dirt Track, Motocross plus a World Superbike Championship, a victory at the Suzuka 8-hour endurance championship race and 4 Daytona 200 wins. His team of championship winning riders includes; Eddie Lawson, Ricky Graham, Scott Russell, Doug Chandler, Ron Lechien, Miguel Duhamel and Rickey Gadson. He was inducted into the Motorcycle Hall of Fame in 2014.
