= Kawasaki Z1 =

Advanced four cylinder motorcycle from 1972

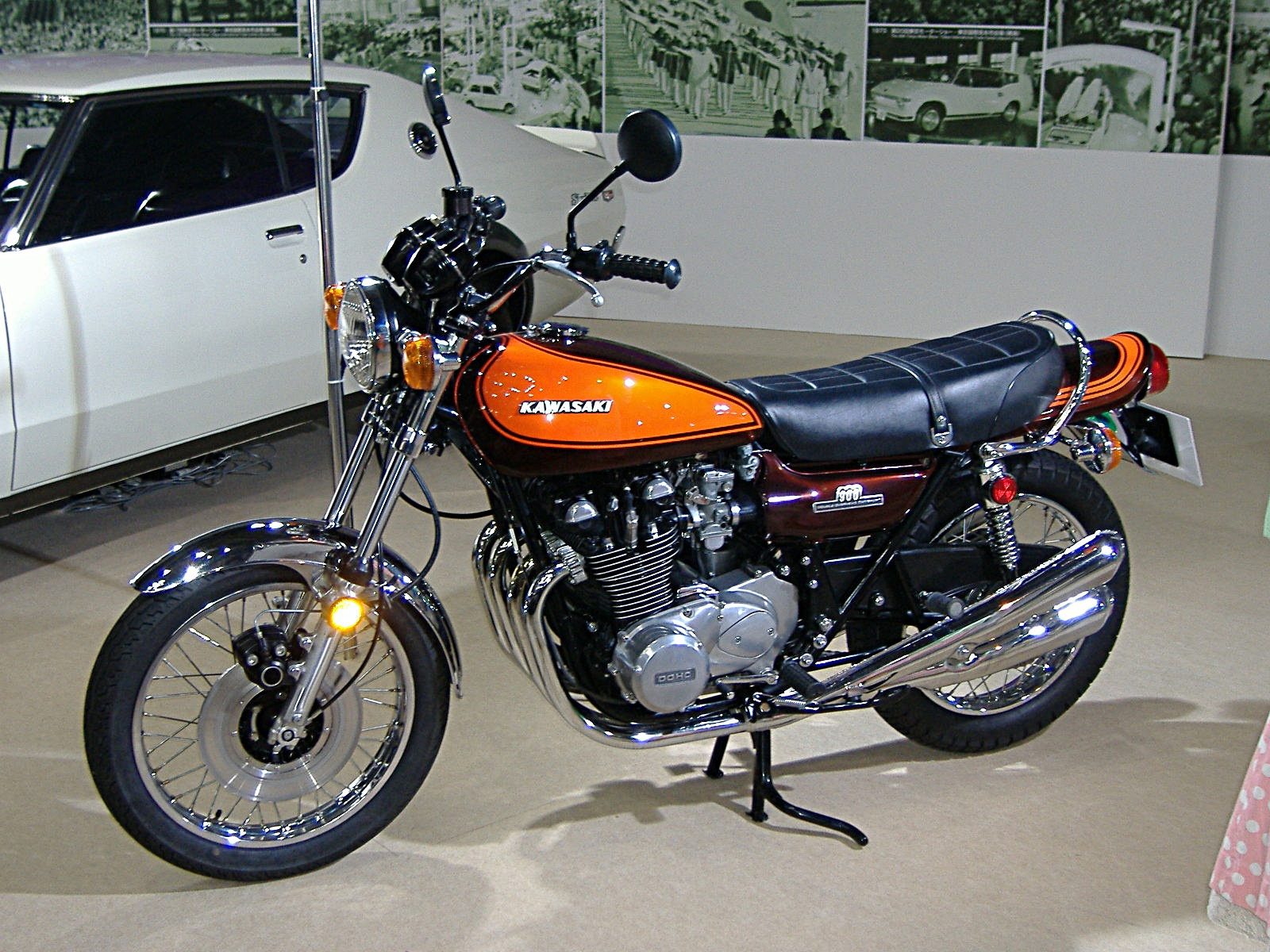
- 1972 Kawasaki Z1
- Manufacturer: Kawasaki Heavy Industries, Ltd.
- Also called: Kawasaki 900 Super Four
- Production: 1972–1975; 85,000 units (est.)
- Successor: Kawasaki Z900
- Class: standard
- Engine: DOHC 903 cm^{3} (55.1 cu in) air-cooled, inline-four
- Bore / stroke: 66 mm × 66 mm (2.6 in × 2.6 in)
- Top speed: 130–132 mph (209–212 km/h)
- Power: 82 PS (81 hp) at 8500 rpm
- Torque: 54.2 lb⋅ft (73.5 N⋅m) at 8500 rpm
- Ignition type: Battery
- Transmission: 5-speed
- Frame type: Full duplex cradle
- Suspension: F: Telescopic, R: Swing arm
- Brakes: F: 11.5 in (290 mm) disk (optional 2nd disk); R: 7.9 in (200 mm) drum
- Tires: F: 3.25-19, R: 4.00-18
- Wheelbase: 1,490 mm (59 in)
- Dimensions: L: 2,200 mm (87 in); W: 685 mm (27.0 in); H: 1,170 mm (46 in)
- Weight: 510 lb (230 kg) (dry); 542 lb (246 kg) (wet)
- Fuel capacity: 18 L (4.0 imp gal; 4.8 US gal)

The Kawasaki Z1 is a four-cylinder, air-cooled, double-overhead camshaft, carbureted, chain-drive motorcycle introduced in 1972 by Kawasaki. Following the introduction of Honda's CB750 in 1968, the Z1 helped popularize the in-line, across-the-frame four-cylinder, a format that became known as the Universal Japanese Motorcycle or UJM.

The Z1 was noted for being the first large-capacity Japanese four-cylinder motorcycle to use the double-overhead-camshaft system on a production motorcycle. When it was introduced, only the MV Agusta 750 S used this system; it was a very expensive limited-production machine, as opposed to the Kawasaki which was less than half the price.

Marketed variously as the Z1-900, 900 Z1 or 900 S4 ("Super Four"), the Z1 was the first of Kawasaki's Z models.

== History ==
The Kawasaki Z1 was developed under the project name "New York Steak". In the late 1960s Kawasaki, already an established manufacturer of two-stroke motorcycles, had begun prototyping a 750 cc four-cylinder four-stroke sports motorcycle working with McFarlane Design in 1969 to develop the bike's overall appearance. When Honda introduced the CB750 to the market first, Kawasaki postponed the Z1's release until its displacement could be increased to 903 cc and the motorcycle could be marketed in the 1000cc-class.

Z1 production began in 1972 as the most powerful Japanese 4-cylinder 4-stroke ever marketed.

In 1972, the Z1 set the world FIM and AMA record for 24-hour endurance on the banked Daytona racetrack, recording 2,631 miles at an average speed of 109.64 mph. Writing in 1976, LJK Setright commented that this record was only 0.36% faster than the previous figure set in 1961 at Montlhéry, France, by a team using a modified BMW R69S, particularly the engine. Also at this time at Daytona a one-off Z1 ridden by Yvon Duhamel that was tuned by Yoshimura set a one-lap record of 160.288 mph. Setright commented that this achievement, using a 100-bhp output engine, was reflective of the progress made in a dozen years.

The Z1 had full instrumentation and an electric start, produced 82 bhp and had a maximum speed of 130 mph to 132 mph (210 km/h). It met with positive reviews from the motorcycle press, who praised its smoothness, damped vibration, easy starting (kick-start and electric were both fitted), straight-line stability and linear acceleration. Steering was accurate and the bike handled well, but testers said the rear tire, chain and rear shocks all wore out quickly.

The Z1 was awarded the MCN 'Machine of the Year' accolade each year from 1973 to 1976 (an award resulting from a readers' opinion-poll run by UK weekly publication Motorcycle News) The Society of Automotive Engineers of Japan (in Japanese) includes the 1972 Z1 as one of their 240 Landmarks of Japanese Automotive Technology.

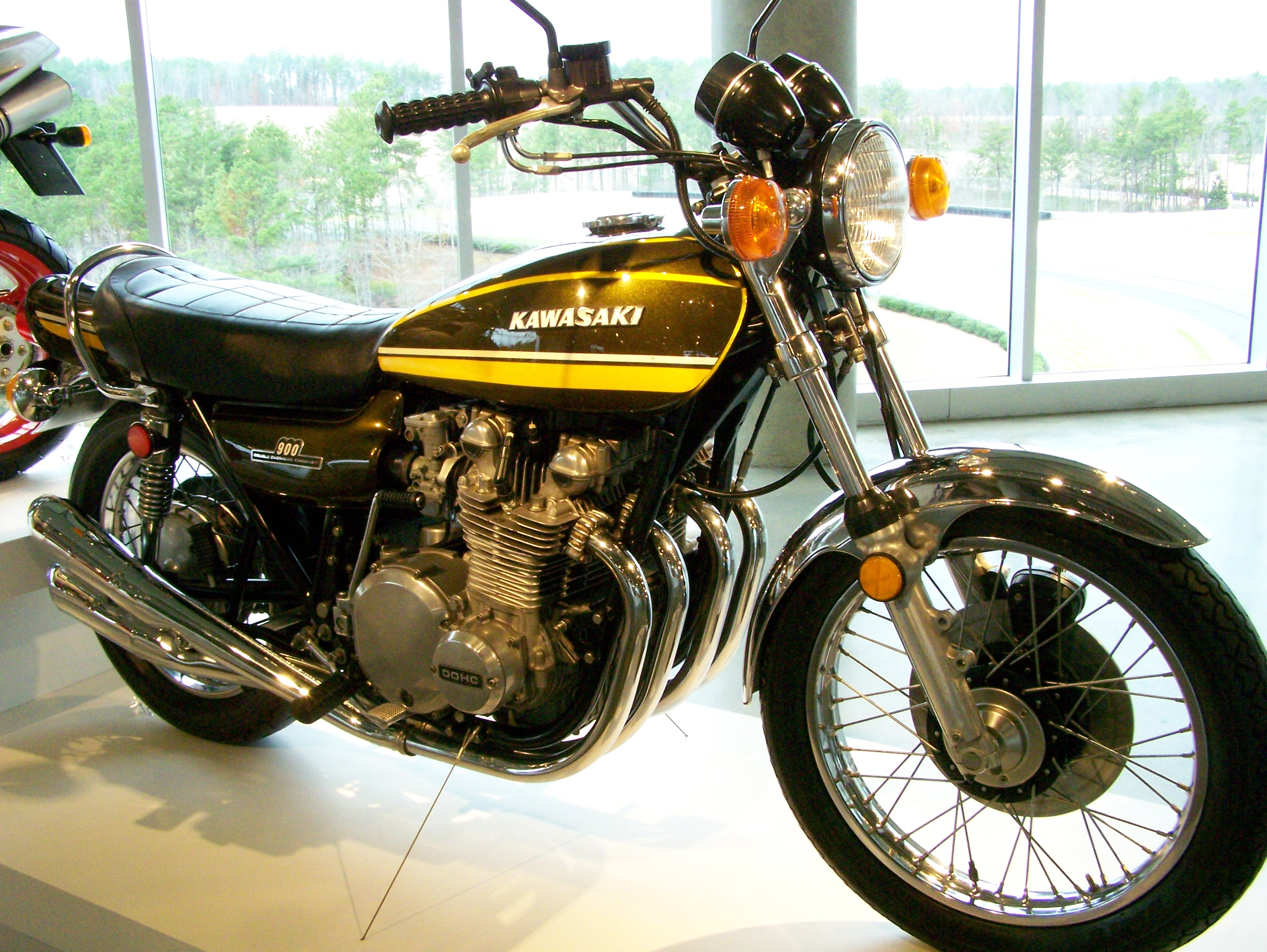
1974 Kawasaki Z1A on display at the Barber Vintage Motorsports Museum

=== Design changes ===
The basic design of the Z1 remained relatively unchanged until 1975, when the 903 cc "Z1-B" was introduced, with changes including increased power output, improved suspension, and a stiffer frame. The automatic chain oiler was deleted, the styling was revised – essentially paint scheme and side-panel nomenclature – and the braking was improved.

=== Follow-up series ===
In 1976 the Z1 was replaced by the Kawasaki KZ900 in the U.S. and Z900 in other markets. This was succeeded by the 1977 Kawasaki Kz1000 ("Z1000") and Kawasaki Z1000 Z1-R, and in 1984 by the Kawasaki Z1100R.

In 1983, Kawasaki won back the crown of the fastest production bike with the Kawasaki GPZ900R which had some other references to its predecessor like the model designation code ZX900, four cylinders and 900 ccm.

The 1991 Kawasaki Zephyr series copied a lot of the design of the first naked Z1, as did the Z1000 in 2003. It received updates in 2007 and a major redesign in 2010.

In 2018 Kawasaki released the Z900RS. This bike is a tribute to the original Z-1, but with such modern features as water cooling, fuel injection, a 6-speed transmission, upside-down front forks, mono-shock rear suspension, ABS brakes, and traction control.

== See also ==
- Kawasaki Z series
- List of motorcycles by type of engine

Records
Preceded by Vincent Black Shadow	Fastest production motorcycle 1973–1975	Succeeded by Ducati 900SS
