= Pops Yoshimura =

Japanese motorcycle builder

"Pops" Yoshimura
- Suzuki GSX-R1000 tuned by Yoshimura
- Born: Hideo Yoshimura; October 7, 1922; Chikushi District, Fukuoka, Empire of Japan
- Died: March 29, 1995 (aged 72); Sagamihara, Kanagawa, Japan
- Occupations: Mechanic, entrepreneur
- Years active: 1954–1995

Hideo "Pops" Yoshimura (吉村 秀雄, Yoshimura Hideo; October 7, 1922–March 29, 1995) was a Japanese motorcycle tuner, race team owner, and manufacturer of specialty motorcycle accessories. He is remembered for his ties to the beginnings of Superbike racing and the Yoshimura factory racing team.

== Motorcycling career ==
Born in Fukuoka City, Japan, Yoshimura was called into military service during the Second World War where he was trained as an aircraft mechanic. After the war, he began tuning motorcycles for American servicemen stationed in Japan and in 1954, he opened his first shop, with his wife and children helping him. In 1971, he moved his business to Los Angeles at the beginning of the four-cylinder superbike era. He gained a reputation as an excellent motorcycle tuner.

In 1976 the AMA introduced a racing class for production based bikes and Yoshimura established himself by entering fast, reliable Kawasaki Z1 bikes. In 1978 he switched to Suzuki bikes and began winning races. Steve McLaughlin won the 1978 Daytona Superbike race while Wes Cooley and Mike Baldwin won the prestigious 1978 Suzuka 8 Hours in Japan. With Wes Cooley as his rider, Yoshimura claimed the AMA Superbike national championship in 1979 and 1980. Yoshimura formed a close relationship with Suzuki and eventually his team became the official Suzuki factory racing team in the United States. His company experienced success as one of the world's largest performance aftermarket sportbike exhaust manufacturers.

Yoshimura died of cancer in 1995. He left a legacy as a master craftsman, tuner and fabricator and was one of the pioneering personalities of superbike racing. In 2000, he was inducted into the AMA Motorcycle Hall of Fame. His son continues to operate the company which still enjoys success in the AMA superbike class with rider Mat Mladin winning six championships in seven years, and Ben Spies winning the 2006-2008 championships.

Yoshimura celebrated its 60th-anniversary event at the 2014 Suzuka 8 Hours race in Japan. Kevin Schwantz and Satoshi Tsujimoto raced a "Pops Yoshimura" special race bike for the Yoshimura Legends race team.
