= LaSalle (automobile) =

Defunct American motor vehicle manufacturer

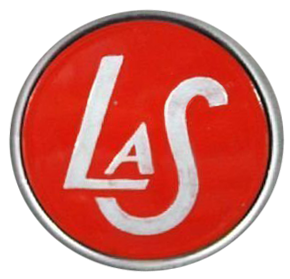
- Product type: Luxury cars
- Produced by: General Motors
- Country: U.S.
- Introduced: 1927 by Alfred P. Sloan
- Discontinued: 1940; 86 years ago
- Related brands: Cadillac
- Markets: U.S.

LaSalle was an American brand of luxury automobiles manufactured and marketed, as a separate brand, by General Motors' Cadillac division from 1927 through 1940. Alfred P. Sloan, GM's Chairman of the Board, developed the concept for four new GM marques – LaSalle, Marquette, Viking and Pontiac – paired with already established brands to fill price gaps he perceived in the General Motors product portfolio. Sloan created LaSalle as a companion marque for Cadillac. LaSalle automobiles were manufactured by Cadillac, but were priced lower than Cadillac-branded automobiles, were shorter, and were marketed as the second-most prestigious marque in the General Motors portfolio. LaSalles were titled as LaSalles, and not as Cadillacs. Like Cadillac – named after Antoine de la Mothe Cadillac – the LaSalle brand name was based on that of another French explorer, René-Robert Cavelier, Sieur de La Salle.

== General Motors companion marque strategy ==
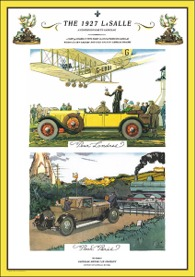
1927 dealer showroom poster promoting the new LaSalle. GM used a European theme in its ads that year in an attempt to build the image that the LaSalle was a worldly vehicle, fashionable in all settings and places.

The LaSalle had its beginnings when General Motors' CEO Alfred P. Sloan noticed that his carefully crafted market segmentation program was beginning to develop price gaps in which General Motors had no products to sell. In an era when American automotive brands were typically restricted to building a specific car per model year, Sloan surmised that the best way to bridge the gaps was to develop "companion" marques that could be sold through the current sales network.

As originally developed by Sloan, General Motors' market-segmentation strategy placed each of the company's individual automobile marques into specific price ranges, called the "General Motors companion make program". The Chevrolet was designated as the entry-level product. Next, (in ascending order), came the Pontiac, Oakland, Oldsmobile, Viking, Marquette, Buick, LaSalle, and Cadillac. By the 1920s, certain General Motors products began to shift out of the plan as the products improved and engine advances were made.

Under the companion marque strategy, the gap between the Chevrolet and the Oakland would be filled by a new marque named Pontiac, a quality six-cylinder car designed to sell for the price of a four-cylinder. The wide gap between Oldsmobile and Buick would be filled by two companion marques: Oldsmobile was assigned the up-market, V8 engined Viking, while Buick was assigned the more compact six-cylinder Marquette brand. Cadillac, which had seen its base prices soar in the heady 1920s, was assigned the LaSalle as a companion marque to fill the gap that existed between it and Buick.

== Design strategy ==
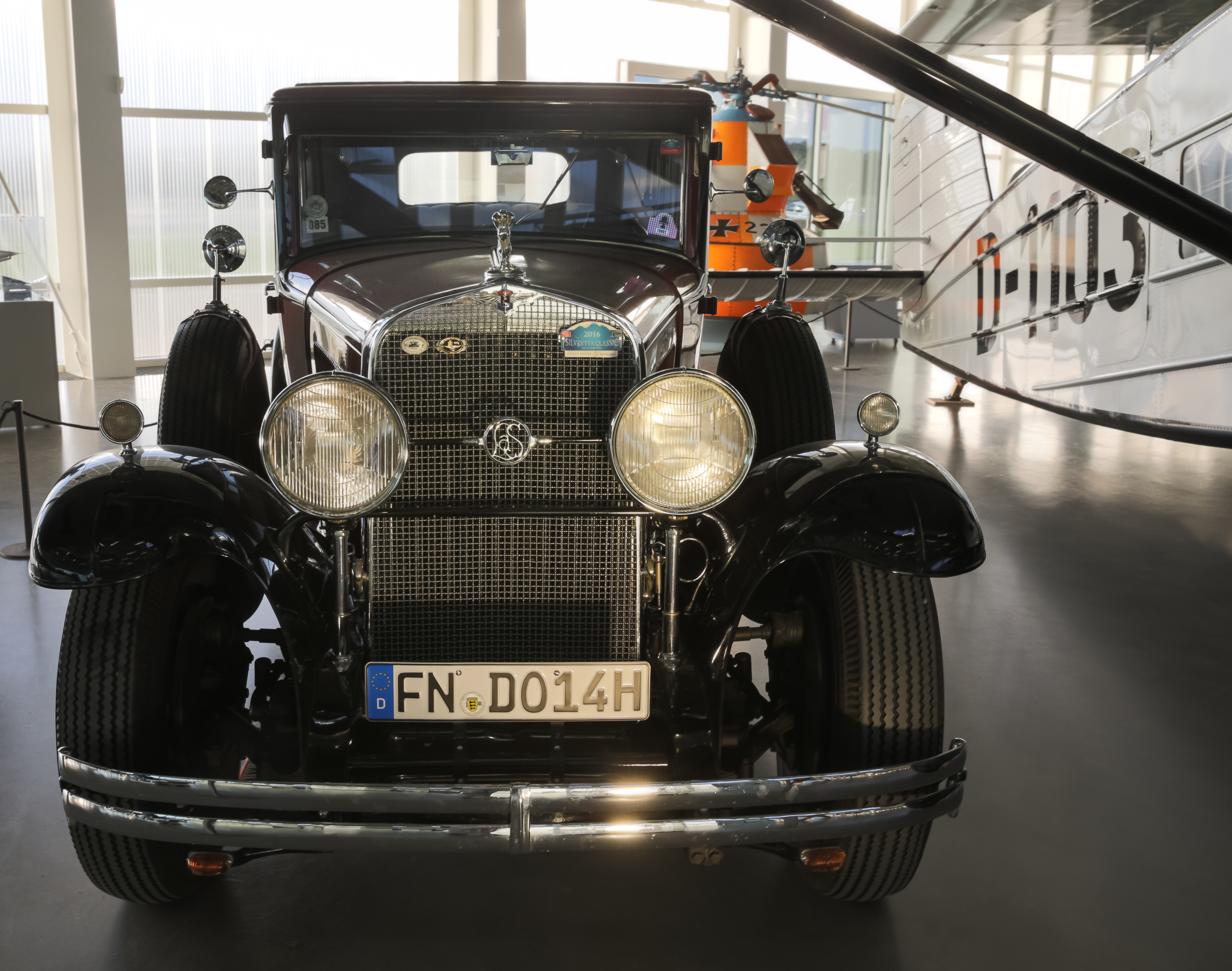
Early LaSalle at the Dornier Museum in Friedrichshafen. The marque's circled trademark "LaS" is cast into the horizontal tie bar between the front lights.

What emerged as the LaSalle in 1927 was introduced on the GM C platform with the Cadillac V8. The 1927 LaSalle was designed by Harley Earl, who had a 30-year career at General Motors, eventually gaining control of all design and styling at General Motors.

Prior to the 1927 LaSalle, automobile design essentially followed a set pattern, with design changes driven principally by engineering needs. For example, the Ford Model T evolved only slightly over its production run; A 1927 Model T was almost identical to a 1910 Model T, while GM made yearly appearance and model name changes across all brands starting in 1908.

Earl, who had been hired by Cadillac's General Manager, Lawrence P. Fisher, conceived the LaSalle not as a junior Cadillac, but as something more agile and stylish. Influenced by the rakish Hispano-Suiza roadsters of the time, Earl's LaSalle emerged as a shorter, yet elegant, counterpoint to Cadillac's larger cars, unlike anything else built by an American automotive manufacturer.

== 1927–1933 ==
LaSalle Series 303
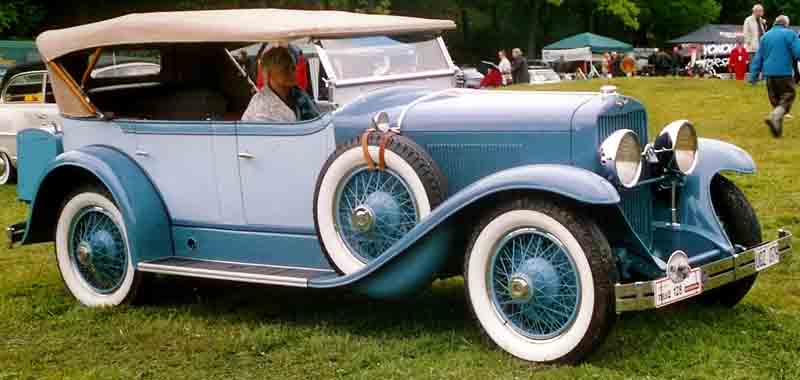
- 1928 LaSalle Series 303 Phaeton

Overview
- Manufacturer: Cadillac (General Motors)
- Model years: 1927-1933
- Assembly: Wyoming Road Assembly, Detroit, Michigan, United States

Body and chassis
- Class: luxury car
- Layout: Front-engine, rear-wheel-drive
- Platform: GM B platform

Powertrain
- Engine: 303 cu in (5.0 L) L-head V8; 328 cu in (5.4 L) L-head V8; 340 cu in (5.6 L) L-head V8; 345 cu in (5.7 L) L-head V8
- Transmission: 3-speed synchromesh manual

Dimensions
- Wheelbase: 125 in (3,175 mm) (1927-1931); 134 in (3,404 mm) (1927-1931); 130 in (3,302 mm) (1932-1933); 136 in (3,454 mm) (1932-1933)

Built by Cadillac to its high standards but at a dedicated factory at Wyoming Road Assembly, the LaSalle soon emerged as a trend-setting automobile. Earl was then placed in charge of overseeing the design of all of General Motors' vehicles. Earl's design even included a nod to the inspirational Hispano-Suiza H6, with the marque's circled trademark "LaS" cast into the horizontal tie bar between the front lights.

There were two wheelbase choices where Fisher offered eight selections while Fleetwood Metal Body offered four coachwork choices on the shorter 128 in (3,251 mm) while only Fisher offered an additional three coachwork choices on the longer 134 in (3,404 mm). For 1927, the most exclusive Fleetwood body was the Transformable Town Cabriolet at US$4,700 ($87,112 in 2025 dollars). The LaSalles of this era were equipped with Cadillac's "Ninety Degree V-8", making the car fast, while its smaller size made it sportier and more agile.

On June 20, 1927, a LaSalle driven by Willard Rader, along with Gus Bell, on the track at the Milford Proving Grounds, achieved 952 miles (1,532 km), averaging 95.2 mph (153.2 km/h), with only seven minutes given over to refueling and tire changes. In comparison, the average speed at that year's Indianapolis 500 was 97.5 mph (156.9 km/h). The test at Milford would have continued, but a problem in the oil system drew the test to an early close.

The Series 303 continued for 1928, and as LaSalle sales began to progress, engineering advancements, appearance changes and optional equipment choices continued. Shock absorbers were now sourced from Lovejoy hydraulic units and the clutch was now upgraded to twin discs. The list of available coachwork choices from Fisher expanded to eleven selections on the 125" wheelbase and six choices on the 134", while Fleetwood now provided two choices on the 125" and only one choice on the 134", that being the Transformable Town Cabriolet at US$4,900 ($91,875 in 2025 dollars).

The first engine upgrade to the LaSalle was introduced in 1929 with the Series 328, which had slight differences to the Cadillac V8 which was also upgraded. The Victoria and business coupe were replaced with the Landau Cabriolet from Fisher while Fleetwood choices were all cabriolet coupes or sedans. Both wheelbase choices were both available for Fisher and Fleetwood coachwork selections. September 1929 is when Cadillac introduced its all-new 1930 Series 353, one month before the Cadillac V-12 and the Wall Street Crash of 1929

The ultra-luxury Cadillac V-16 made its grand introduction January 1930, and the LaSalle received another engine upgrade introduced in the LaSalle Series 340. Fisher body selections were reduced to seven closed while Fleetwood choices expanded to six. The only wheelbase used was 134" and a radio was first introduced as an optional item for US$175 ($3,373 in 2025 dollars) and all LaSalle's were prewired with an antenna imbedded in the roof. Wheels were available in hickory artillery style, wire wheels or solid pressed steel discs. The engine displacement of the 1930 LaSalle and the 1928–1929 Cadillac Series 341 were essentially identical so the LaSalle was labeled as Series 340 while the 1930 Cadillac V8 was upgraded to Series 353. In an attempt to further add exclusivity, Fleetwood convertible coachwork selections were further distinguished by the descriptions "Fleetcliffe", "Fleetlands", "Fleetway" and "Fleetwind" which didn't continue for 1931. The next vehicle choice offered by GM was the all-new Buick Series 50 coupe or sedan with a straight-eight engine with a similar appearance and a Fisher Body for US$1,540 ($29,680 in 2025 dollars) while a LaSalle Series 340 sedan was listed at US$2,565 ($49,435 in 2025 dollars).

The 1931 LaSalle's engine was again upgraded and the Series 345-A appeared with the same appearance, engineering and optional equipment changes. Fisher and Fleetwood coachwork choices were again changed based on popularity, and additional optional equipment was added retaining the 134" wheelbase used the previous year. The Cadillac Heron or Goddess hood ornament made the options list for US$20 ($385 in 2025 dollars) while the latest fashion accessory called a radiator rock screen could be installed for US$33 ($636 in 2025 dollars).

From the mid-1910s, a V8 engine was regarded as a luxury expectation, while other manufacturers remained with straight-8 engines, but in 1932 the Ford V8 was introduced with a standard equipment V8 displacing 221 cu in (3.6 L). Body style selections and a wide arrange of Duco automotive lacquer paint color selections, introduced by DuPont, were beginning to become commonplace. The 1932 LaSalle Series 345-B and 1933 Series 345-C followed the same pattern of appearance, engineering upgrades and ever-growing options list.

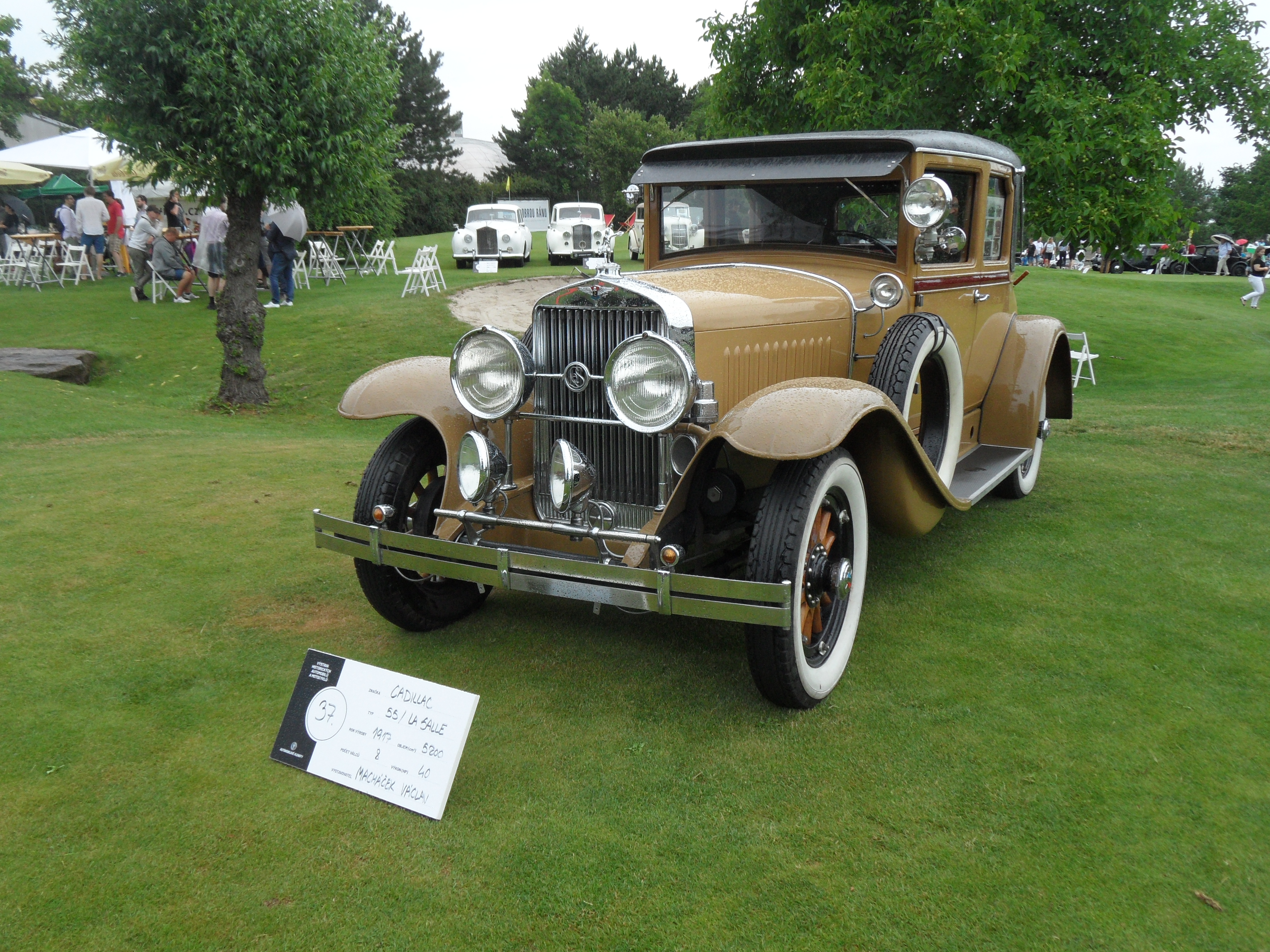
1927 LaSalle Series 303 Coupe

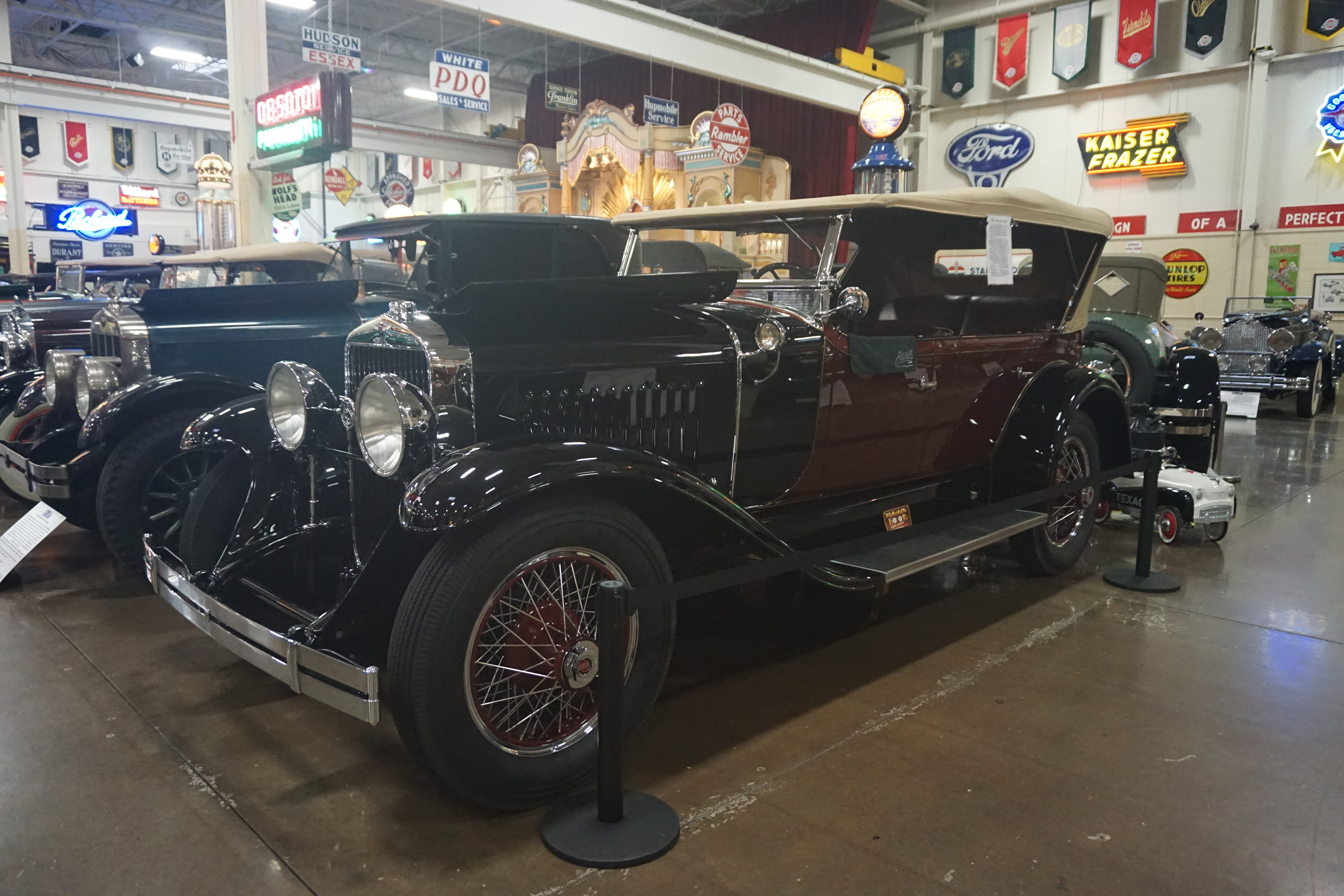
1927 LaSalle 303 Phaeton

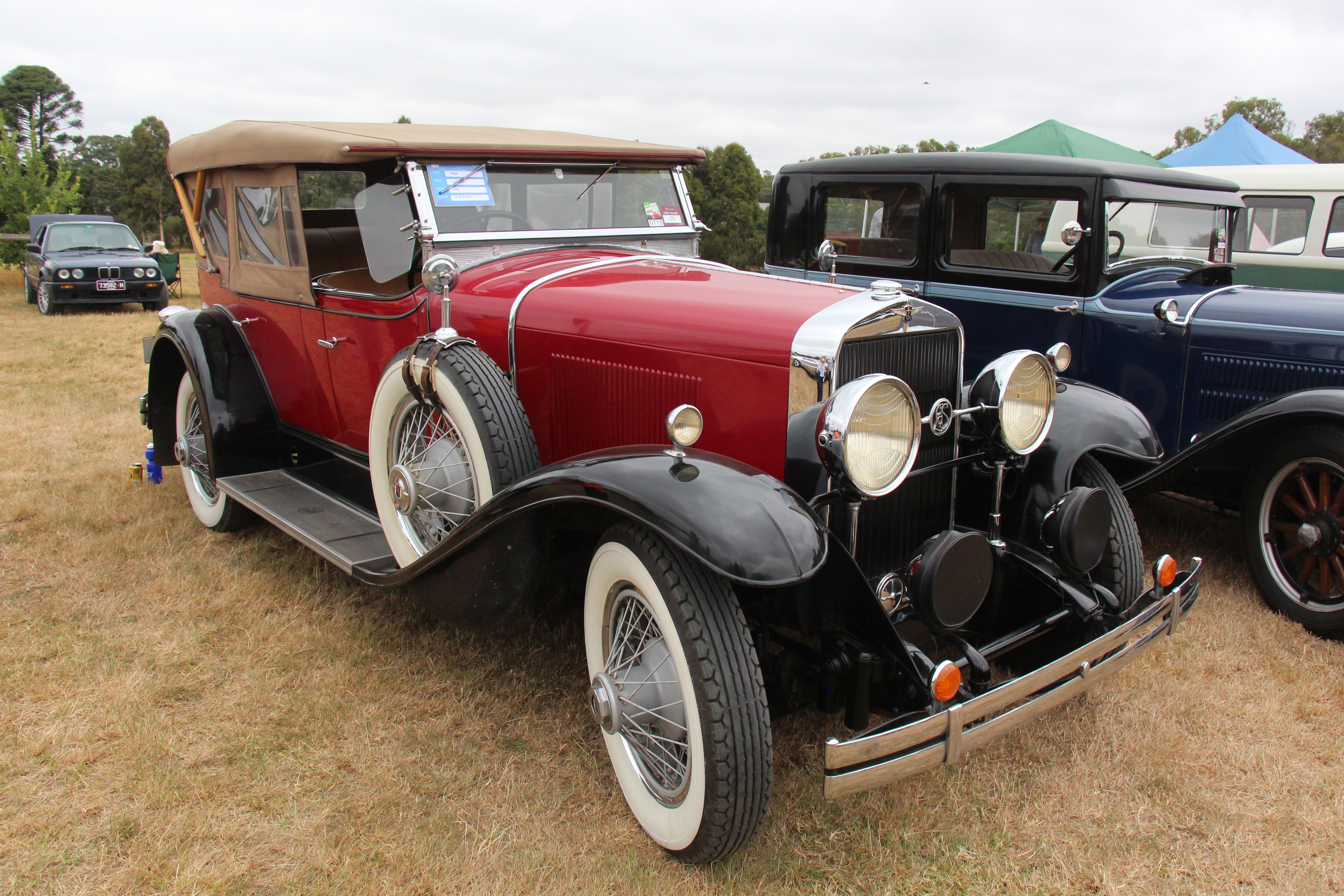
1929 LaSalle Series 328 Touring Sedan

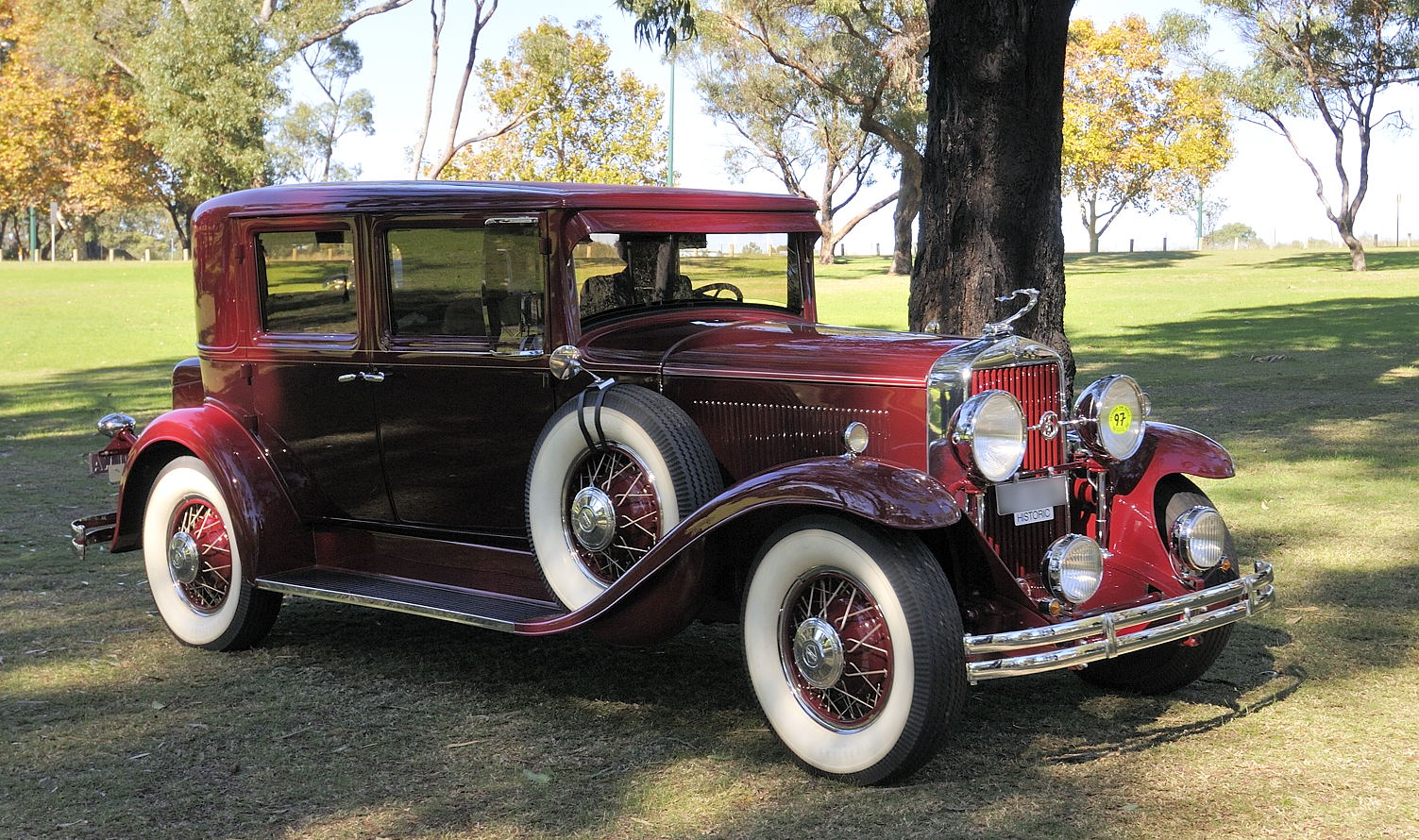
1930 LaSalle Series 340

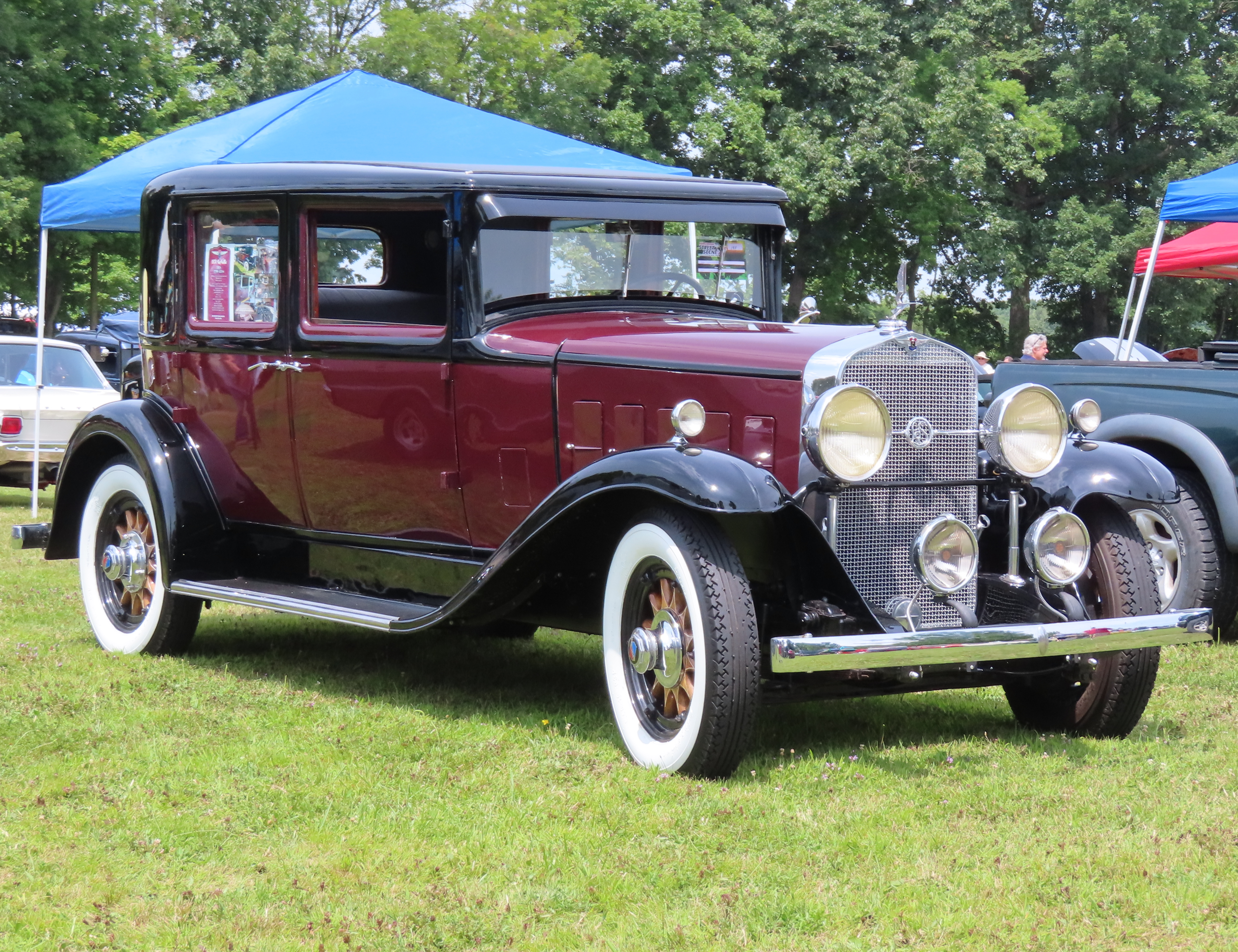
1931 LaSalle 345-A Town Sedan

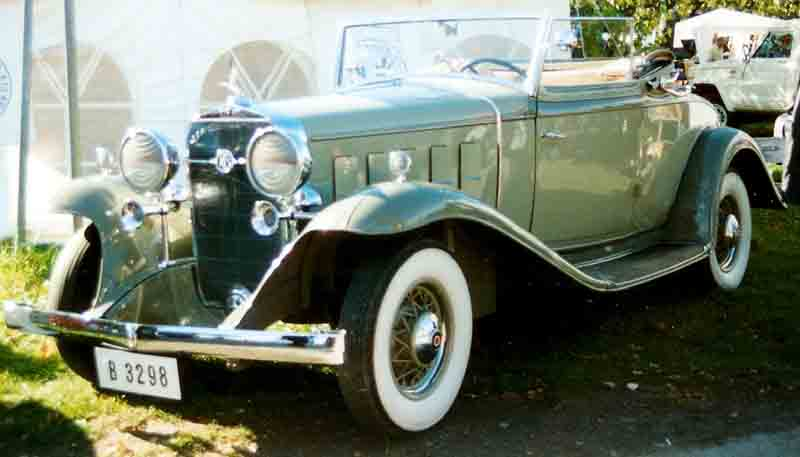
1932 LaSalle Series 345-B 2-door convertible

== 1934–1938 ==
LaSalle
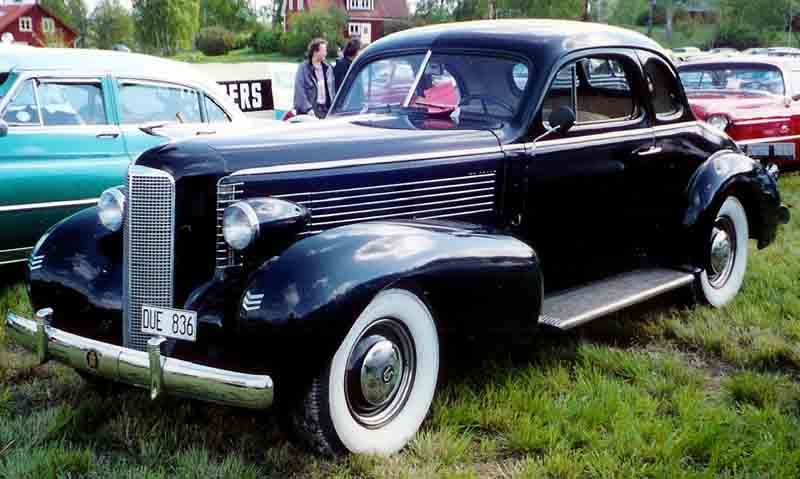
- 1937 LaSalle Series 37-50 coupe

Overview
- Manufacturer: Cadillac (General Motors)
- Model years: 1934-1938
- Assembly: Wyoming Road Assembly, Detroit, Michigan, United States

Body and chassis
- Class: luxury car
- Layout: Front-engine, rear-wheel-drive
- Platform: GM B platform

Powertrain
- Engine: 240.3 cu in (3.9 L) L-head V8; 248 cu in (4.1 L) L-head V8; 322 cu in (5.3 L) L-head V8; 248 cu in (4.1 L) Oldsmobile Straight-8 engine (1934-1936)
- Transmission: 3-speed synchromesh manual

Dimensions
- Wheelbase: 119 in (3,023 mm); 120 in (3,048 mm); 123 in (3,124 mm) (1934-1936); 124 in (3,150 mm) (1935-1936)

Beginning with the 1934 model year, a significant portion of the LaSalle, now called the Series 50 Model 350, was more closely related to the Oldsmobile L-Series, Buick Series 40 and Buick Series 50 while sharing an appearance with the senior Cadillac Series 355s. This was marked by a shift to the Oldsmobile- and Buick-based B platform. Again, Earl's work with the LaSalle resulted in a graceful vehicle, led by an elegantly thin grille that now concealed the previously exposed radiator, which was shared with Cadillac and Pontiac for that year. Earl's other contribution was the modern, airplane-styled, semi-shielded portholes along the side of the hood. All bodies were now made by Fleetwood. 1933 was the first year all GM vehicles were installed with optional vent windows which were initially called “No Draft Individually Controlled Ventilation” later renamed "Ventiplanes" which the patent application was filed on Nov. 28, 1932. It was assigned to the Ternstedt Manufacturing Company, a GM subsidiary that manufactured components for Fisher Body and they were introduced on the Series 50 in 1934.

The Series 50 was also no longer available with a V8, which was a distinction shared with all Cadillacs, and now only available with an Oldsmobile sourced flathead inline-eight, while Buick continued to offer the more technologically advanced overhead valve straight-eight engine exclusive to Buick. The LaSalle was the first Cadillac to use hydraulic brakes sourced from Bendix and various components were sourced from within different GM Divisions in order to cut production costs. The Oldsmobile engine was not assembled by Oldsmobile then supplied to the LaSalle factory, instead the parts were sent to the LaSalle factory and assembled by Cadillac-trained LaSalle assembly teams to authentically declare it was manufactured by Cadillac engineers. The LaSalle sales department further invited clients to witness the cars being manufactured and listed the different companies that sourced various items that were used to manufacture the 1934 LaSalle.

This LaSalle Series 50 Model 350 listed at US$1,550 ($37,304 in 2025 dollars) for a choice of coupes, sedans or convertibles and was now priced US$1,000 ($24,067 in 2025 dollars) below the least expensive Cadillac. Its mission was not to fill a price gap, but to keep the luxury-car division out of the red. But as the economy began to recover, the LaSalle did not, at least not commensurate with the economy. Sales were 7,195 in 1934, 8,651 in 1935 and 13,004 in 1936 while Buick appeared to be more attractive yet frugal.

To further emphasize that the 1935 LaSalle was improved from the previous model, the name was, again, changed to Series 35-50, dropping the "model" designation, while the vehicle was largely the same with the usual appearance, options list changes, and mechanical advancements. Meanwhile, the Packard One-Twenty had been introduced in 1935 and was very successful. For 1936 the LaSalle was renamed the Series 36-50 and had additional competition from the Lincoln-Zephyr, introduced in 1936. The 1937 LaSalle was called the Series 37-50, a naming convention that would continue with the last LaSalle Series 40-50 and 40-52.

For 1937, Cadillac made the LaSalle its own again, giving it the designation Series 37-50 and the 322 cu in (5.3 L) monobloc V8 of the Series 60, new styling, a lower price range, and a heavy promotion emphasizing that the car was completely Cadillac-built. It was too late. Model year sales of 32,000 LaSalles was a great improvement, but it remained far behind the Packard.

A 1934 LaSalle Series 50 Model 350 was chosen as the Pace Car for the Indianapolis 500, and a 1937 LaSalle Series 37-50 convertible also served as an Indy 500 Pace Car.

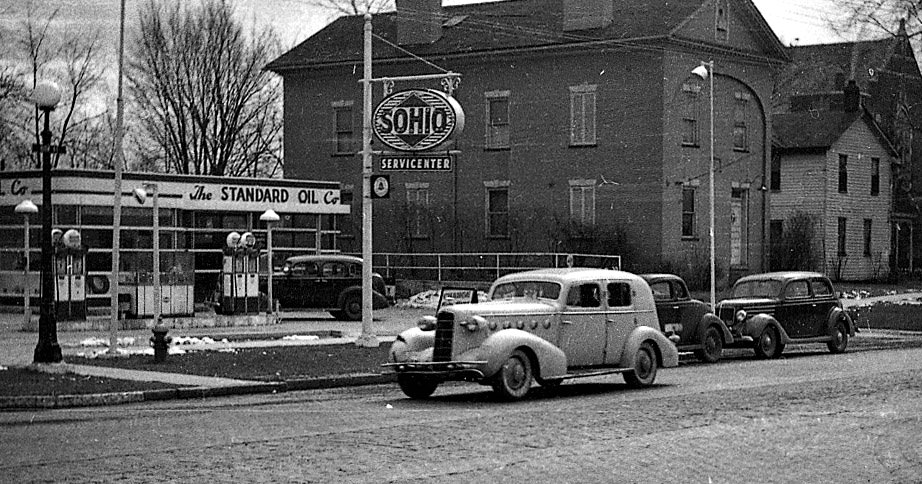
1934 LaSalle Series 50 Model 350

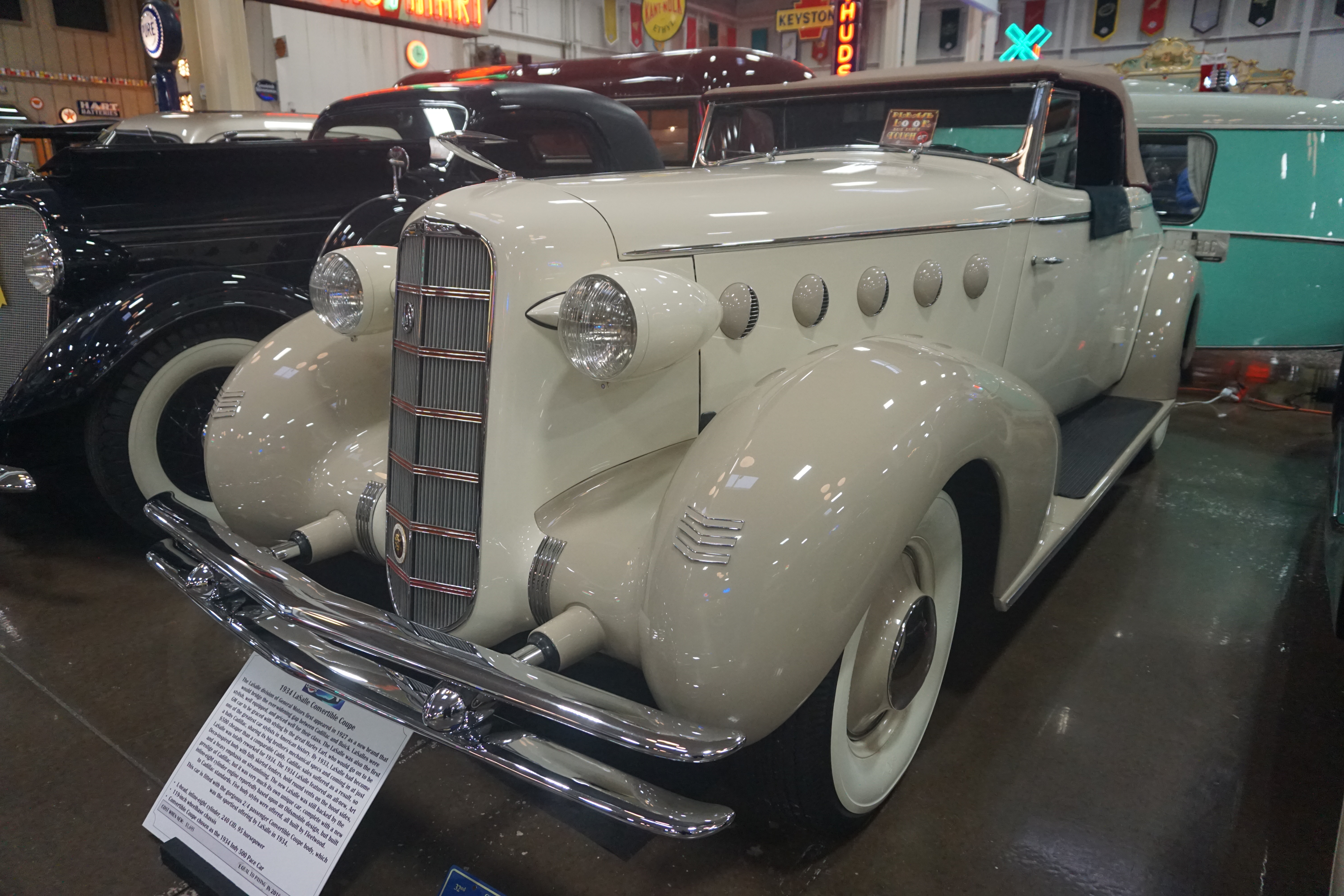
1934 LaSalle Convertible Coupe

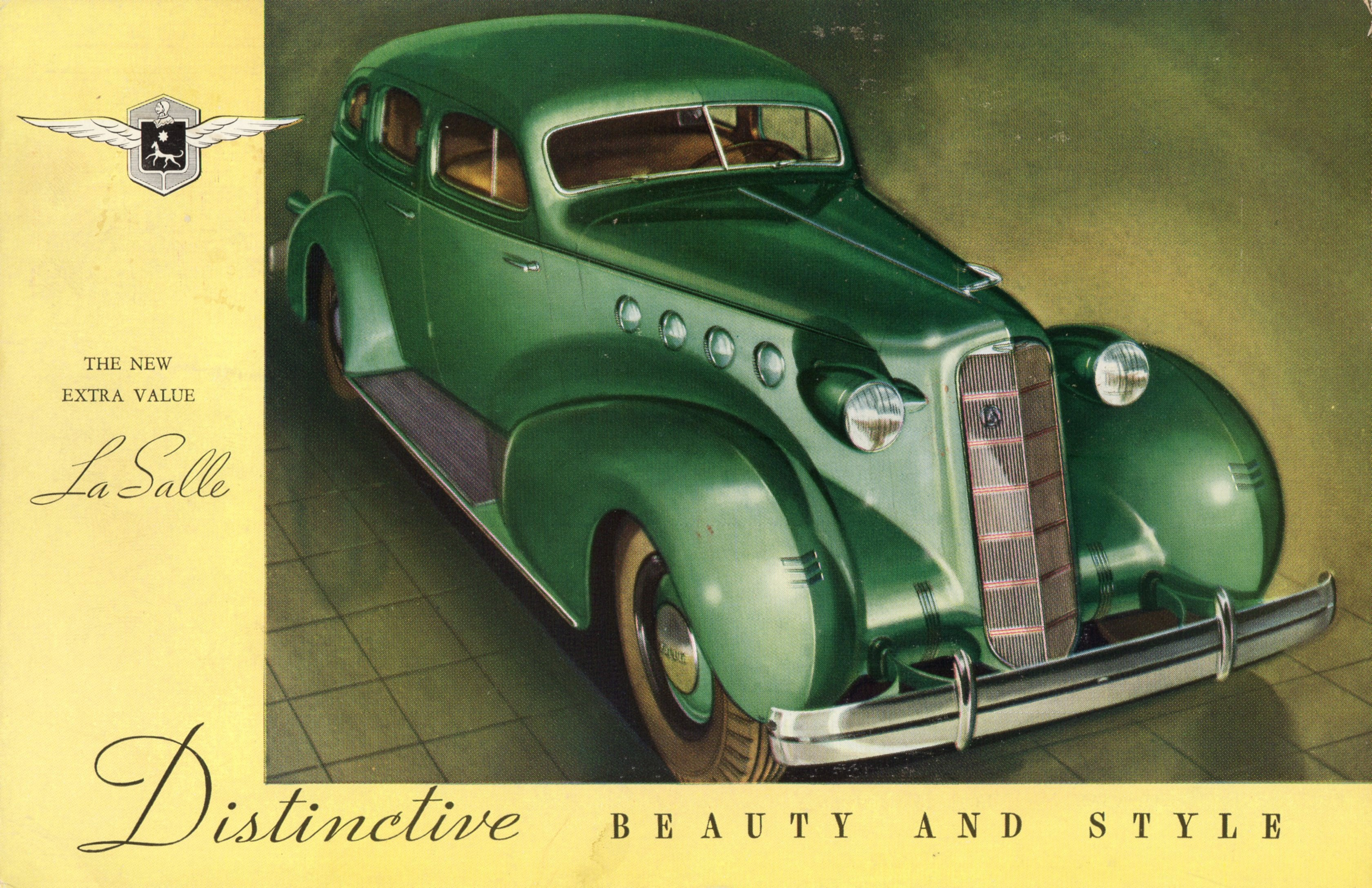
1935 LaSalle advertisement, showing the distinctive Harley Earl body design

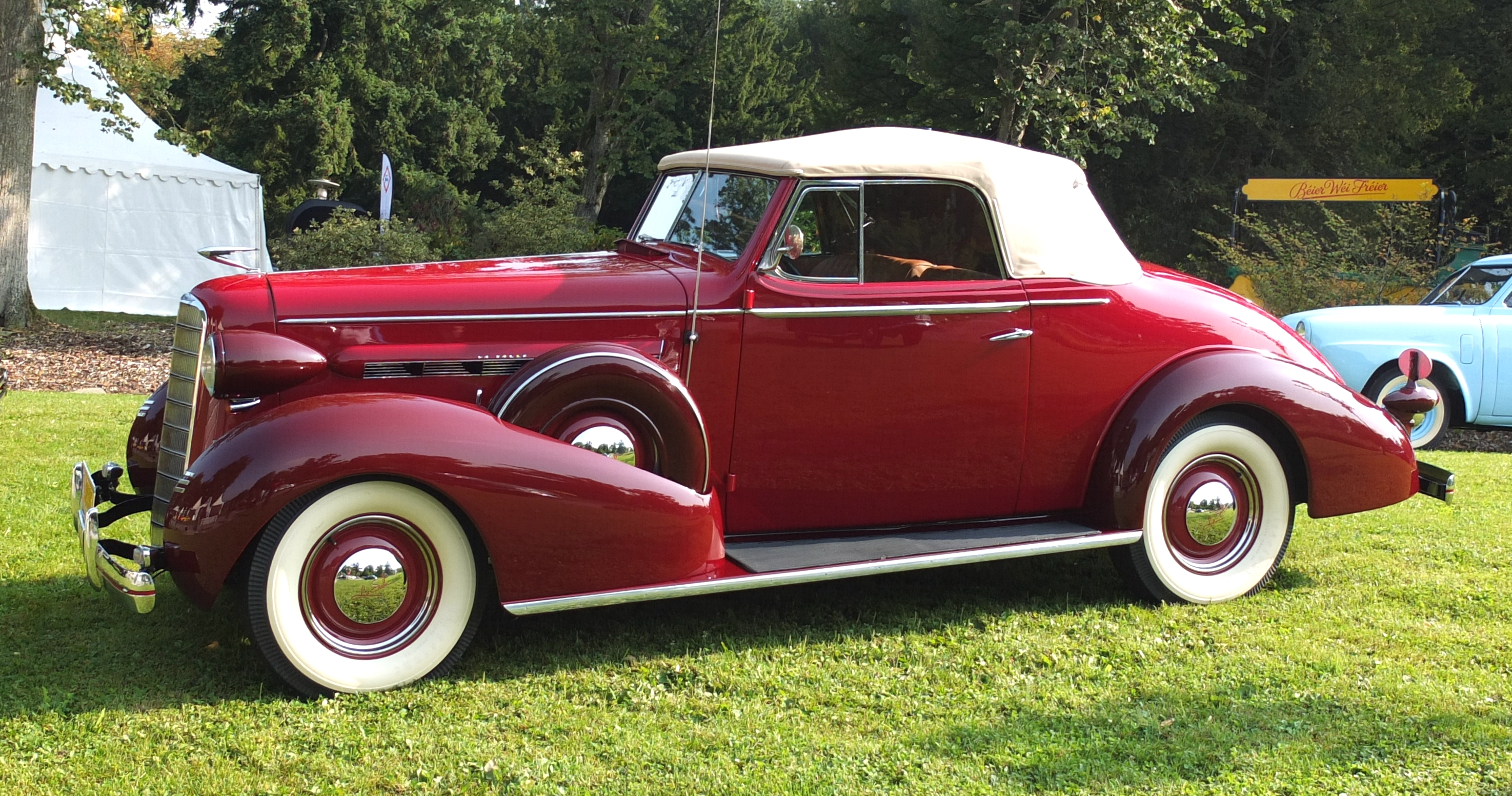
1936 LaSalle Series 36-50 Roadster

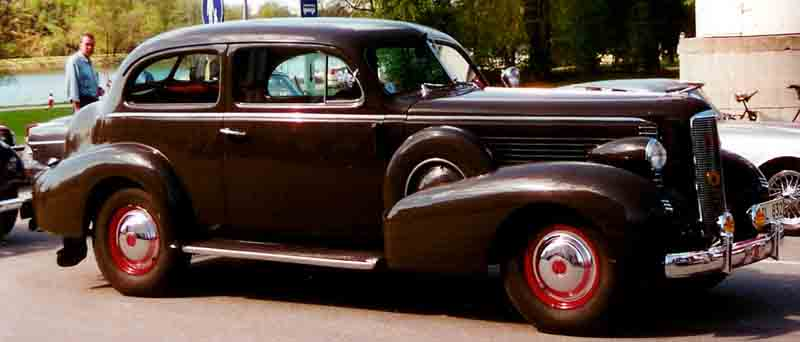
1937 LaSalle Series 37-50 2-door Touring Sedan

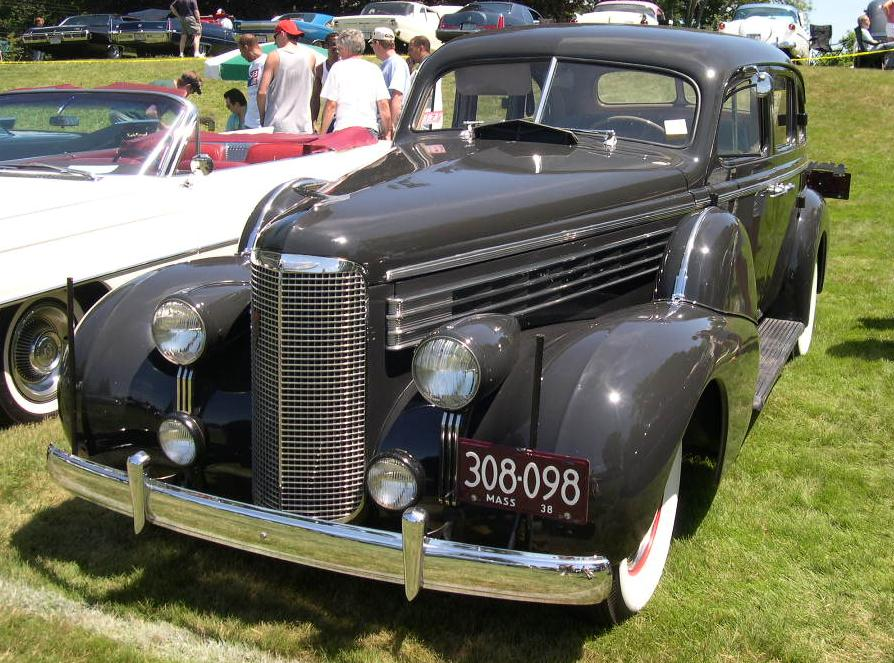
1938 LaSalle Series 38-50

== 1939–1941 ==
LaSalle
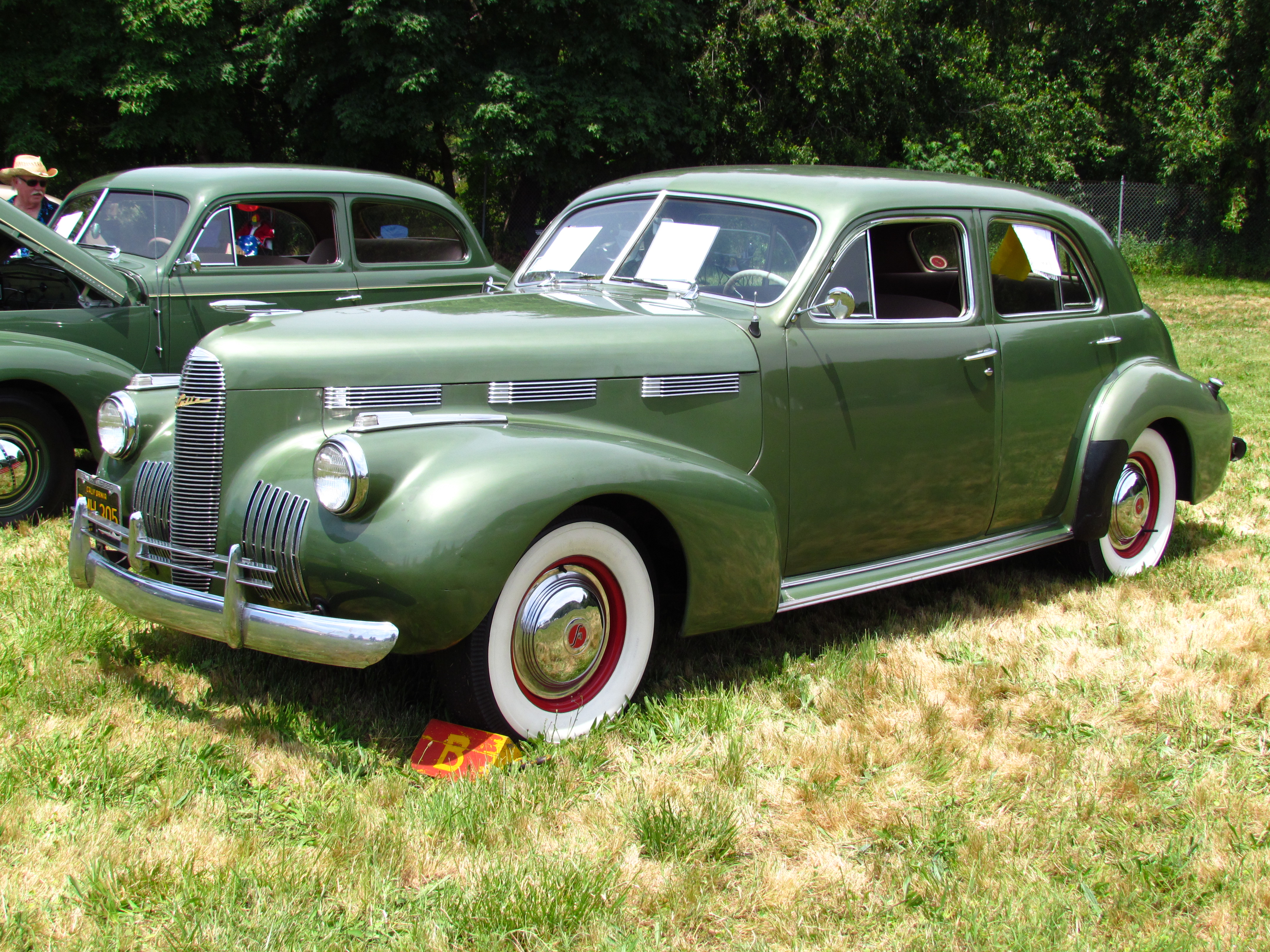
- 1940 LaSalle Special Series 40-52 4-door sedan

Overview
- Manufacturer: Cadillac (General Motors)
- Model years: 1939–1941
- Assembly: Wyoming Road Assembly, Detroit, Michigan, United States

Body and chassis
- Class: luxury car
- Layout: Front-engine, rear-wheel-drive
- Platform: GM B platform

Powertrain
- Engine: 322 cu in (5.3 L) L-head V8
- Transmission: 3-speed synchromesh manual

Dimensions
- Wheelbase: 120 in (3,048 mm); 123 in (3,124 mm)

In its final years, the LaSalle Series 39-50 was once again more Cadillac-like in its appearance and details, and was essentially identical to the Cadillac Series 61. The narrow radiator grille opening was retained and was flanked by additional side grille work which aided in heat dissipation from the engine. Headlights, which had moved down and been secured to the body between the grille and the fender, were again attached to the radiator shell. LaSalle also added a sunroof, marketed as the "Sunshine Turret Top". Sales climbed from 15,501 in 1938 to 23,028 in 1939.

The final 1940 LaSalles were introduced in October 1939 with a full array of semi-custom body styles, as it had in its first year, including a convertible sedan. Earl oversaw this redesign. The LaSalle emerged with a smooth-flowing design, its thin radiator flanked by a series of thin chrome slots. In its final year, sales of the LaSalle reached the second-highest level ever at 24,133. In addition to the Series 40-50, there was also the lower, wider Series 40-52 Special using General Motors' new "Torpedo"-style body.

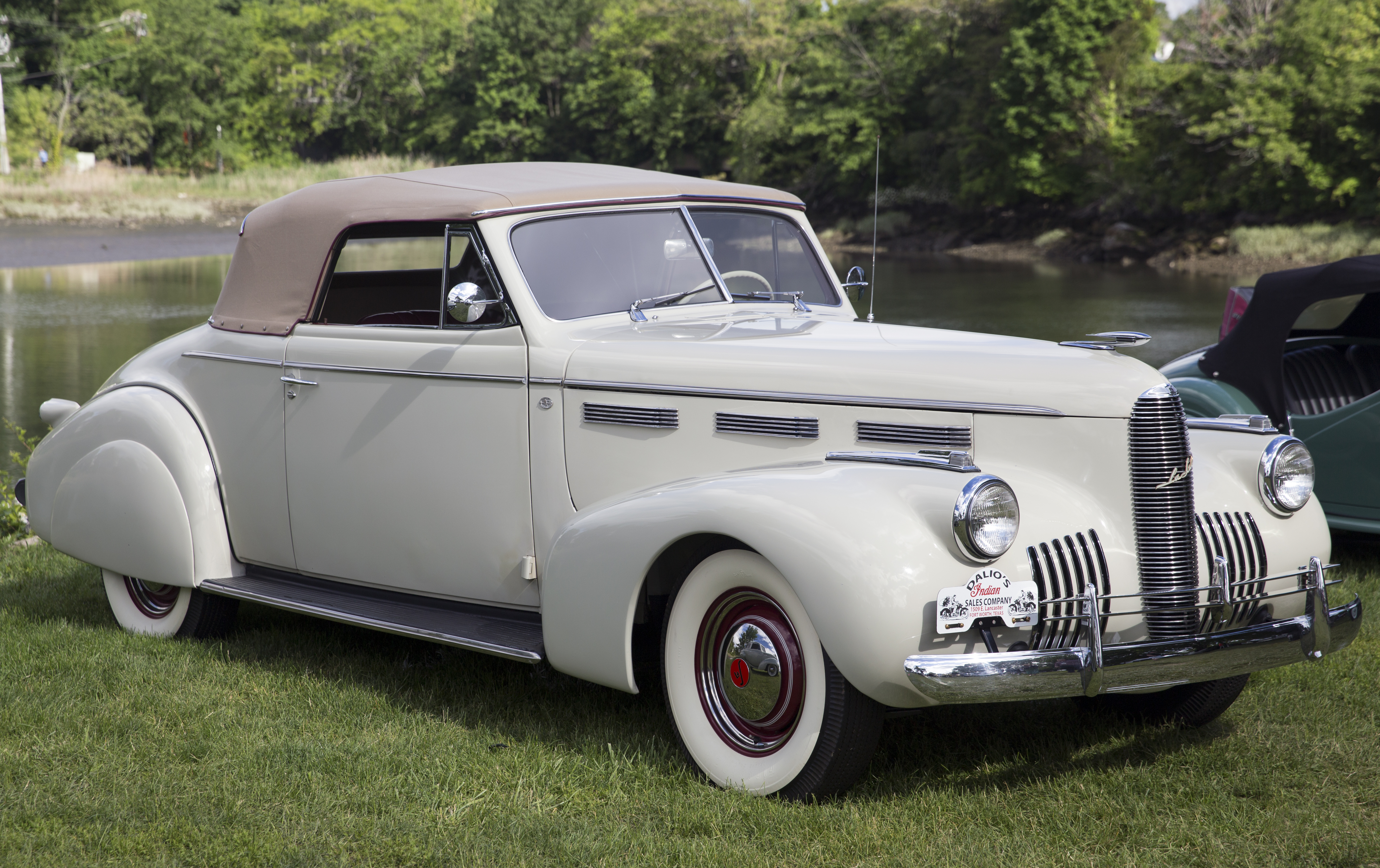
1940 LaSalle Series 50 Convertible Coupe

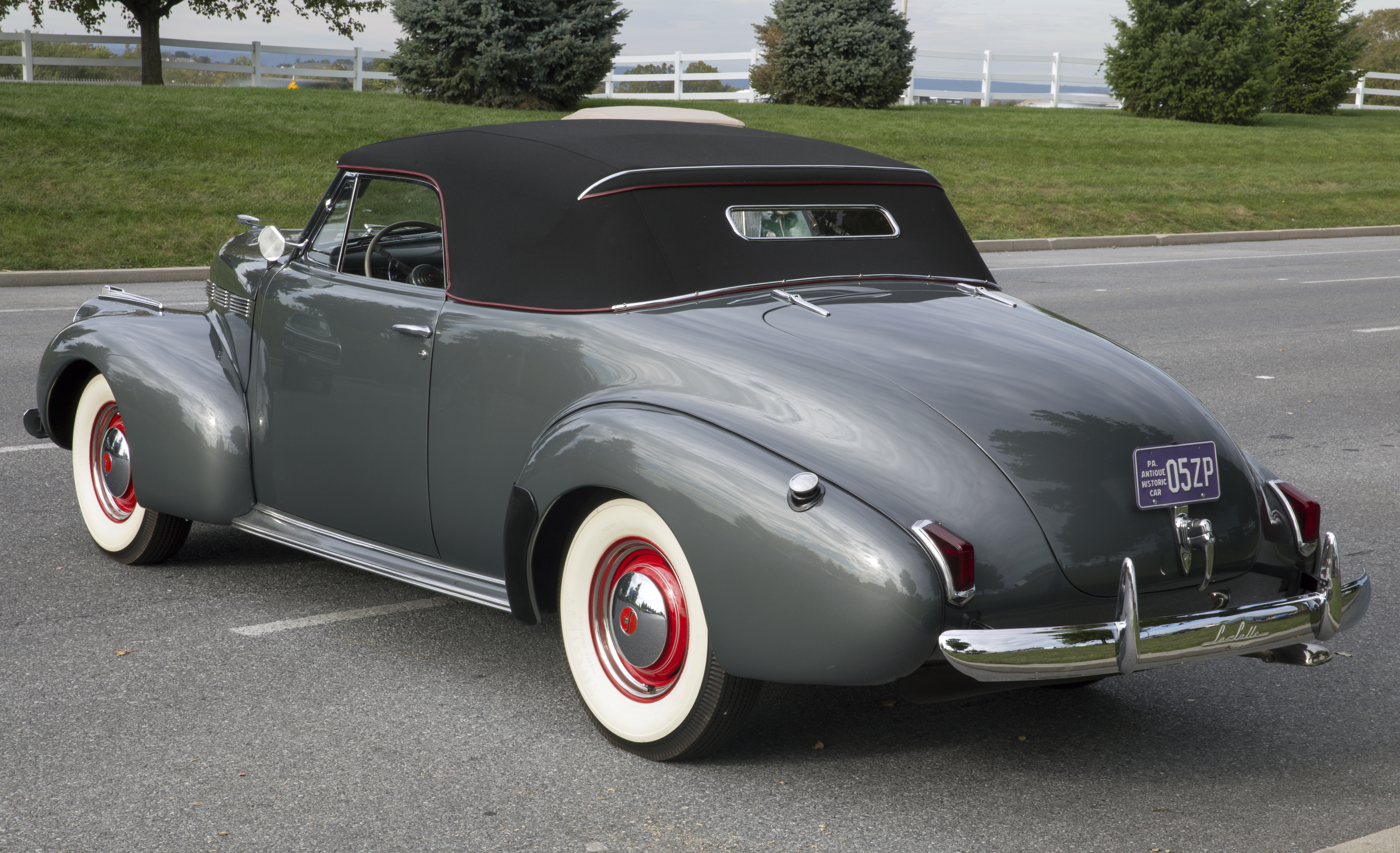
1940 La Salle Special Series 52 Convertible Coupe (rear view)

=== 1941 ===
By the time the decision was made to drop the LaSalle, at least three wood-and-metal mockups had been made for potential 1941 LaSalle models. One was based on the notchback GM C platform, which ended up being shared by the Cadillac Series 62, the Buick Roadmaster and Super, the Oldsmobile 90, and the Pontiac Custom Torpedo. A second was based on the fastback GM B platform, which was eventually shared by the Cadillac Series 61, the Buick Century and Special, the Oldsmobile 70, and the Pontiac Streamliner Torpedo. A third was a modified notchback design, derived from the fastback B-body, but described as "A-body-like", that was finally used by the Cadillac Series 63. Any or all of these could have ended up being part of the next LaSalle line. However, it is widely believed that of the three, the third design was most likely to have been a LaSalle, with that platform being assigned exclusively to LaSalle, and that the second design, whose platform was shared with the Series 61, was the next-most-likely. In 1941, sales of the Cadillac Series 61 and 63 were 29,258 and 5,030, respectively.

In retrospect, LaSalle sales initially had exceeded Cadillac's since 1933, but since its introduction in 1935, the medium priced Packard One-Twenty had consistently outsold the LaSalle by an average of 72 percent over the six-year period 1935–1940 inclusively. It was decided to fold the LaSalle into the more prestigious Cadillac marque. LaSalle did not have the time to develop a prestigious name before the onset of the Great Depression and did not have the opportunity afterward. The Great Depression, combined with LaSalle's stalling sales numbers, caused Cadillac to rethink its companion make. Both Buick and Oldsmobile had eliminated the Marquette and the Viking in 1930, their second model year. Cadillac also saw sales of its cars losing ground, as confirmed Cadillac buyers tried to trim pennies by buying the less expensive LaSalle. LaSalle sales also were falling, from a high of 22,691 models in 1929 to a low of 3,290 in 1932.

While the introduction of LaSalle showed there was a market for a luxury car that was more conservative in appearance and price, GM already had Buick which filled that role very successfully. The attention given to LaSalle could have been invested in Buick as the mainstream luxury brand, and concentrated on Cadillac being more elusive and unique to protect the brand image. The introduction of the "Art and Colour Section" headed up by Harley Earl and a shared design theme in all GM products further complicated the brand distinction between the original brands in that the only differences among Oldsmobile, Buick, LaSalle, and Cadillac were exterior design appearance, wheelbase length, and colors, while charging extra due to marketing and pricing objectives.

== LaSalle concept vehicles ==
In his 2013 article, "GM's Road Not Taken", Robert Cumberford reviewed the restoration of GM's 1955 Motorama La Salle II Roadster. Cumberford likened the Roadster to a harbinger of GM's future. While the Roadster concept showcased important new technology, including an aluminum block, double overhead cam and fuel-injected V6, the technology went unrealized. GM instead emphasized styling over engineering advancement for the decades that followed and did not bring "an aluminum block, fuel-injected, overhead-cam V-6 into production until 2004".

Cumberford described the Roadster as "a signpost to the many wrong turns that led to the bankruptcy of what was in 1955 the largest business entity in the entire world (GM)".

There was nostalgia for the LaSalle name, and at various points in the 1950s, 1960s and 1970s, General Motors issued Motorama cars and proposed new consumer automobiles under the name. The year 1955 saw two Motorama concept cars, the LaSalle II four-door hardtop and the LaSalle II Roadster. Ordered to be destroyed, both the four-door hardtop and the roadster were shipped to the Warhoops Salvage Yard in Sterling Heights, Michigan; instead of being destroyed they were hidden in a corner of the facility.

In 1990, collector Joe Bortz purchased and restored the Roadster, which was featured in a 2013 article in Automobile (magazine), for which the author, Robert Cumberford won the 2013 Best Article of the Year Award from the Motor Press Guild for his Automobile magazine article, "GM's Road Not Taken" about the La Salle II Roadster.

The LaSalle name was raised again when Cadillac was developing a new small luxury sedan, but it was passed over in favor of Cadillac Seville. Early mockups of what was to become the 1963 Buick Riviera were badged "LaSalle II," as the Cadillac division was being considered for production of this successful personal luxury car.

== LaSalle in media ==
Eddie Murphy’s character bails out of a 1939 coupe during a car chase in the movie Harlem Nights.

In the 1967 film The St. Valentine's Day Massacre, gangster Mike Heitler (played by Leo Gordon) buys a used LaSalle for $750 (equivalent to about $12,000 in 2021), to be disguised as a Chicago police car for use in the St. Valentine's Day Massacre.

In the 1970s television show All in the Family, Archie and Edith Bunker sing, "Gee, our old LaSalle ran great" in the program's opening theme song, "Those Were the Days." Many could not understand the now-obscure reference, and the opening was re-recorded in future seasons with the word ‘LaSalle’ enunciated a little more clearly.

In Season One, episode 21 of The Streets of San Francisco, Lew Ayres mentions the hubcap he finds as being from a 1934 LaSalle.

This is the car that the character Marcus Brody drives when he visits Indiana Jones in the film Raiders of the Lost Ark (1981).

W. E. B. Griffin’s WW2 novel Semper Fi includes a detailed subplot about a young marine’s cunning scheme to purchase a nearly-new LeSalle from an unscrupulous car dealer.

== See also ==
- De Soto, a similarly-sourced (named for another early Colonial-era explorer) automotive marque of the Chrysler Corporation (1928-1961)

== Notes and references ==
7. Those Were The Days theme song of tv show All in The Family Lyrics include “gee our old LaSalle ran great.”

- Van Gelderen, Ron; Larson, Matt (May 23, 2000). La Salle: Cadillac's Companion Car (First ed.). Turner. ISBN 9781563115196.
