= David E. Davis =

American journalist

David Evan Davis Jr.
- Born: November 7, 1930; Burnside, Kentucky, U.S.A.
- Died: March 27, 2011 (aged 80); Ypsilanti, Michigan
- Occupations: Writer, editor, publisher
- Writing career
- Genre: Automotive journalism

David Evan Davis Jr. (November 7, 1930 – March 27, 2011) was an American automotive journalist and magazine publisher widely known as a contributing writer, editor and publisher at Car and Driver magazine and as the founder of Automobile magazine.

Davis influenced the format of automotive journalism by introducing premium publishing features and he influenced the profession by mentoring a gamut of automotive photographers, illustrators, designers and journalists – including Jean Lindamood Jennings, Robert Cumberford, Bruce McCall, P. J. O'Rourke, Jim Harrison and David Halberstam – as well as younger colleagues and journalism students.

Known for his own straightforward writing style and his colorful personality – at six-foot-three inches tall, bearded, portly and always immaculately dressed – Davis had once been featured in The New York Times On the Street fashion section. Automotive writer Todd Lassa called him "a raconteur, an impresario, a bon vivant in a tweed, three-piece suit." As an editor he maintained an "atmosphere of creative turbulence."The New York Times described him as "a combative swashbuckler who encouraged criticism of the cars it tested, even at the risk of losing advertising."

His collected writings were published in 1999 "Thus Spake David E.: The Collected Wit and Wisdom of the Most Influential Automotive Journalist of Our Time".

Davis said his success in automotive journalism came from "his ability to marry southern storytelling to big-city presentation." The Truth About Cars said "automotive journalism in the post-Vietnam-War era was entirely and singlehandedly defined by David E. Davis Jr." Time magazine called Davis the "dean of automotive journalists."

== Background ==
Davis was born in Burnside, Kentucky, on November 7, 1930 – in a house without running water, on a hill called Tyree's Knob. His aunt was Harriette Arnow, author of the best-selling novel, The Dollmaker. Davis graduated from high school in Royal Oak, Michigan, having failed his journalism class. He later briefly attended Olivet College. He worked in a series of jobs: as a race car driver, Volkswagen salesman, men's clothing salesman, ad salesman with Road & Track, and assembly line worker in a car factory. He would develop his "simple, declarative [writing] style" working on aviation technical manuals.

Davis overturned while racing his sports car (an MG TF 1500) at age 25 in Sacramento – badly damaging his face. He lost his left eyelid, the bridge of his nose, the roof of his mouth and most of his teeth. In addition to the accident essentially scraping off half his face, the ambulance attendant had thrown away pieces of his nose. Davis required extensive plastic surgery – and was later able to hide his disfigurement under his full beard. He described the crash and its aftermath as pivotal:

I suddenly understood with great clarity that nothing in life — except death itself — was ever going to kill me. No meeting could ever go that badly. No client would ever be that angry. No business error would ever bring me as close to the brink as I had already been.

Davis lived in Ann Arbor, Michigan, with his second wife Jeannie Luce Kuhn Davis. His three children from his first marriage to Norma Jean Wohlfiel Davis were Peg, David E. Davis III, and Matthew, who has held a number of roles in the automotive business, including senior PR jobs at Nissan and Infiniti and working as a European contributor for numerous publications, including Autoblog. He had three stepchildren – Eleonore Kuhn Snow, Vincent and Anthony Kuhn.

He died unexpectedly at St. Joseph Mercy Hospital in Ypsilanti, Michigan on March 27, 2011, shortly following bladder cancer surgery.

== Career ==
After selling an article to Motor Trend in 1957 for $50, Davis became a contributing writer in 1962 to Car and Driver magazine, at age 32. By the time he joined Car and Driver, Davis had "worked in four automobile factories, sold cars in three imported-car dealerships and one Packard showroom." At the magazine, he became friends with automotive luminaries including race car drivers Juan Manuel Fangio, Dan Gurney and Carroll Shelby. Davis left Car and Driver in 1967 – reported variously as either having been fired by Leon Mandel or having resigned as a result of a difference of opinion with management over his criticism of the Blaupunkt radio in his "Turn your Hymnals to 2002" column.

At Chevrolet's advertising agency, Campbell-Ewald, Davis wrote copy for Corvette and Corvair advertisements alongside future crime novelist Elmore Leonard. He was named Vice President/Creative Director. He is co-credited along with James Hartzell in creating Chevrolet's tagline, "Baseball, hot dogs, apple pie and Chevrolet" – a campaign that Car and Driver and other publications ranked as the best automobile commercial of all time.

He returned to Car and Driver in 1976 to serve as the magazine's editor and publisher – and moved its headquarters from New York to Ann Arbor in 1977. He resigned as Editor/Publisher in 1985 when Car and Driver was sold to CBS.

In 1986, he founded Automobile with financial backing from Rupert Murdoch – using the credo No Boring Cars. Davis introduced full-color photography and thick stock, increasing the magazine's literary standards to distinguish it from the other three U.S. automotive magazines, Car and Driver, Motor Trend and Road & Track. Murdoch sold the magazine profitably in 1991 to K-III Publications, which became Primedia (now Rent Group) – which was later sold to Source Interlink Media (now Motor Trend Group), the current owner of the magazine. When Automobile was acquired by K-III, Davis also became the editorial director of the company's Motor Trend magazine. Automobile celebrated its 25th anniversary in 2011.

Davis later left Primedia and in semi-retirement started the online automotive magazine Winding Road. In July 2009, he returned to Car and Driver as a contributor. Until his death, he continued to contribute to numerous automotive venues, including international publications such as the British magazine CAR.

Davis mentored a spectrum of automotive journalists, including Eddie Alterman, editor-in-chief at Car and Driver and Jean Jennings, former president and editor-in-chief (after Davis himself) at Automobile. At the University of Michigan he was member of the board of the Knight-Wallace Fellowship, a journalism program, and he encouraged Ford Motor Company to underwrite a fellowship for automotive journalism at the school. In 2004, he received an honorary Doctor of Humane Letters degree from the University of Michigan, serving as its spring 2004 commencement speaker.

== Personality ==
Davis was widely known for his "larger-than-life," "polarizing personality." Joe DeMatio, deputy editor at Automobile Magazine said Davis "was very opinionated and did not hesitate to ruffle feathers, even if they were those of his own bosses."

Unintimidated by the companies whose products he reviewed, Davis originally resigned from Car and Driver after refusing to rescind a comment he made about a BMW 2002's weak radio reception and dash; saying its Blaupunkt radio "could not pick up a Manhattan station from the other side of the George Washington Bridge." General Motors, which owned Opel and sold the cars through Buick dealers in the U.S., withdrew much of its advertising when he parked an Opel Kadett in a junkyard for a "hit piece", AKA "The Opel Kadett Assassination" (PDF). Archived from the original (PDF) on April 1, 2021. James R. Healey, the auto columnist for USAToday, recalled that while speaking at the Washington Automotive Press Association, Davis also likened General Motors managers to the piano players in a whorehouse, "aware of what was going on upstairs but unable to do much about it even if they were so inclined." He ended the speech by saying that the company was standing on the "shoulders of midgets". The company subsequently pulled much of its advertising. In 2010, he published a column in Car & Driver titled "If the original Henry Ford was still alive, he would be building Subarus."

Davis was periodically estranged from the editor of Automobile, Jean Jennings, who described him as "the most interesting, most difficult, cleverest, darkest, most erudite, dandiest, and most inspirational, charismatic and all-around damnedest human being I will ever meet. I have loved him. I have seriously not loved him." He also maintained an ongoing friendly rivalry with automotive writer Brock Yates, who said "to know [Davis] is to acknowledge his short fuse and his penchant for unpredictable, snorting charges at friendly targets."

David Cole, chairman emeritus of the Ann Arbor-based Center for Automotive Research called Davis "a provocateur, in some ways kind of like the Bob Lutz of auto journalism." Bob Lutz himself said Davis "was one of those rare individuals who filled a room with his presence." Michael Jordan, executive editor at Edmunds.com, said that "at Car and Driver in the early 1960s, Davis made himself important, yet he also made automotive journalism important." Eddie Alterman, editor-in-chief at Car and Driver, described Davis as "the dashing, witty, high-spirited, and deeply knowledgeable writer/editor who brought the automobile to life."

His office was filled automotive art and featured a clipping with Ernest Shackleton's 1914 ad to enlist participants in a voyage to Antarctica: "Men wanted for hazardous journey. Small wages. Bitter cold. Long months of complete darkness. Constant danger. Safe return doubtful. Honour and recognition in case of success." Outside his office hung an ad reading "Protest Against the Rising Tide of Conformity."

In everyday situations, rather than the conventional "How are you?", Davis was known to ask "Is your life a rich tapestry?"
