= Robert Cumberford =

American journalist

Robert Wayne Cumberford
- Born: August 4, 1935 (age 91); Los Angeles, California, U.S.
- Occupations: Design Editor Automobile; Editor Auto & Design; Editor Air Progress; Automotive stylist Writer; Editor; Design Critic
- Writing career
- Genre: Automotive journalism

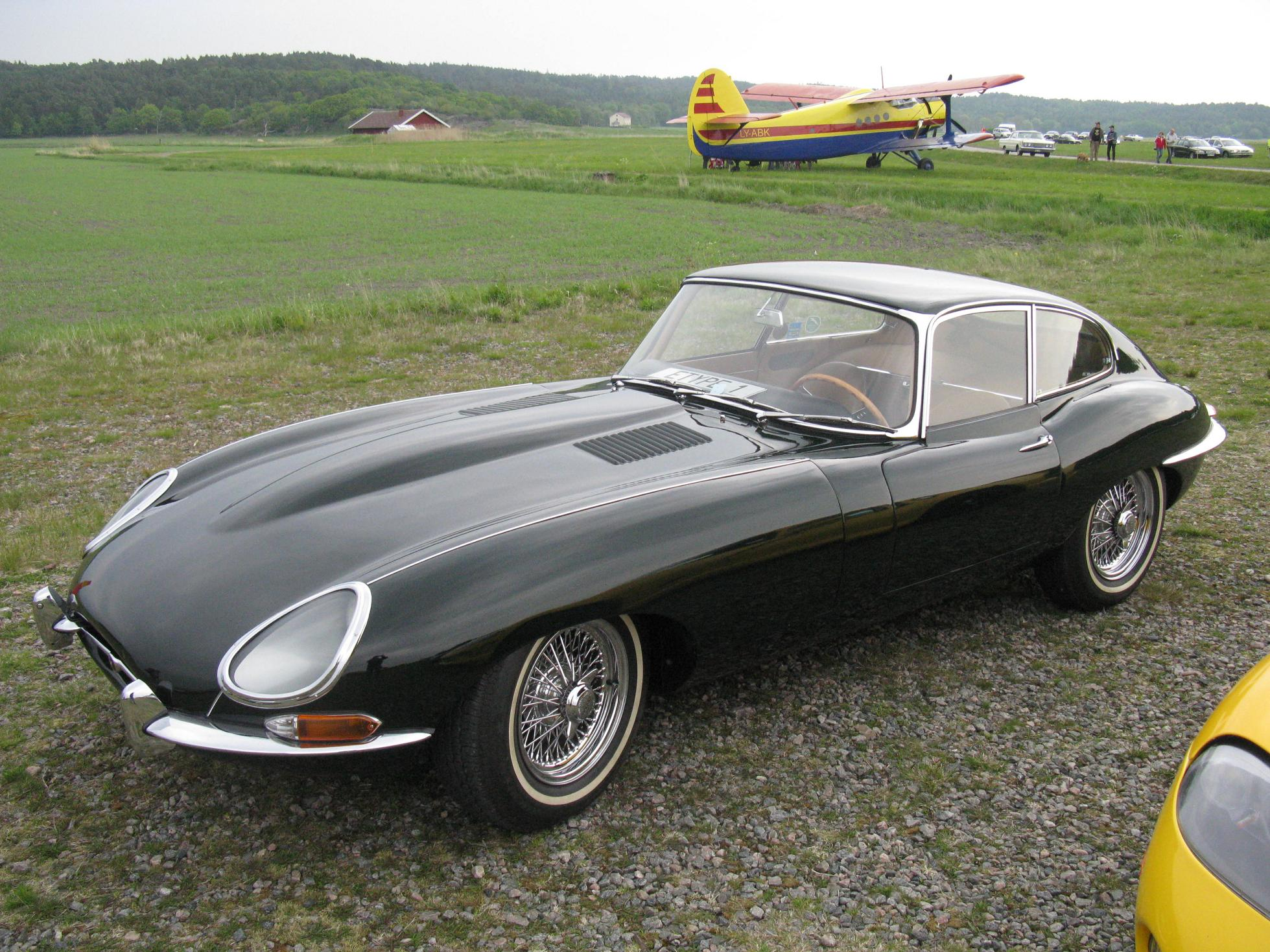

the Jaguar E-Type is elegant, extremely phallic and a great middle-aged man's compensation... the ultimate automotive expression of phalliform perfection.

— Robert Cumberford
GM's Road Not Taken

In his award-winning 2013 article, Cumberford reviewed the restoration of GM's 1955 Motorama LaSalle II Roadster, a concept car scheduled to be destroyed but which survived until its restoration began in 1990.

Cumberford likened the Roadster to a harbinger of GM's future. While the Roadster concept showcased important new technology – including an aluminum block, double overhead cam, fuel-injected V6 – the technology went unrealized. GM instead emphasized styling over engineering advancement for the decades that followed – and didn't bring "an aluminum block, fuel-injected, overhead-cam V-6 into production until 2004."

Cumberford described the Roadster as "a signpost to the many wrong turns that led to the bankruptcy of what was in 1955 the largest business entity in the entire world (GM)."

Robert Wayne Cumberford (born August 4, 1935) is a former automotive designer for General Motors, author and design critic – widely known as Automotive Design Editor and outspoken columnist for Automobile magazine.

Examples of Cumberford's critiques include:

- The dream cars of the 50s: "myths created to make people dream about the future."
- The $2,500 Tata Nano: "perhaps the most significant car since the Ford Model T was introduced 100 years ago."
- The Jeep Cherokee: "One of the 20 greatest cars of all time."
- the NSU Ro80: “A handsome, modern-looking car with much cleaner lines than anything of the time.”
- The Jaguar E-Type: "Elegant, extremely phallic and a great middle-aged man's compensation," and "the ultimate automotive expression of phalliform perfection."
- The Ford Five Hundred: "It's a pretty good trick to make a brand-new car look old, bland and boring right out of the box. No doubt it's a good car, but one fundamentally uninteresting visually."
- The 2016 Acura NSX: It's "very hard to mess up the styling of a mid-engine sports car... but Acura has managed it."
- The Tesla Model S: "I would happily own one."
- The Tesla Model 3: "It is an excellent design."

On the automotive industry, Cumberford wrote in 1998 that "a lot of automotive enthusiasm is based on what is undoubtedly immature excitement over excess." In 2014 he wrote that there is "no foreseeable future for the Italian coachbuilding firms," referring to the storied design houses of Bertone, Zagato, Ghia, Pininfarina and Giugiaro.

On prominent automotive figures, Cumberford described Alec Issigonis, who received a knighthood "in recognition of his engineering genius," as "not terribly innovative in a mechanical sense." He wrote in 2004 that intensely controversial car designer Chris Bangle is "a man with the courage of his convictions and of solid character, and he is worthy of our admiration for that alone."

Noted automotive cartoonist Stan Mott described Cumberford as "an intellectual automotive enthusiast." Automobile editor Jean Lindamood Jennings said Cumberford "is highly opinionated, as every working car designer in the world today knows, sometimes painfully," adding that his design reviews have become "wildly popular." At the 2013 LA Auto Show, Jennings said Cumberford "tends toward a certain cantankerous crustyness just shy of curmudgeonly."

Cumberford won the 2013 Best Article of the Year Award from the Motor Press Guild for his article, "GM's Road Not Taken" about the LaSalle II Roadster, published in Automobile magazine in March 2013.

== Background ==
Cumberford grew up in Southern California, the son of a Texas-born housewife and a Scotsman from Chile who worked for L.A.'s streetcar company, the Los Angeles Railway. He began sketching cars at age 15 and developed a strong interest in aircraft design as child, later saying that he preferred aircraft design to automobile design.

He had wanted to study aeronautical engineering on scholarship at Caltech but attended instead the Art Center of Pasadena, then known as the Art Center School, working in a grocery store and cleaning the classroom floors to help pay tuition.

== Career ==
Cumberford eventually dropped out of school, but inadvertently started a writing career when a rendering of a pogo stick he'd designed in the style of a Jaguar was shown to John Bond, editor of Road & Track – and Cumberford was invited to write a review to go with the rendering. He had already designed two automobiles, the Parkinson Jaguar Special and the Ken Miles Flying Shingle. In 1954 at age eighteen, his race report on the 12 Hours of Sebring was published.

At age 19, Cumberford sent 118 renderings personally to GM's Harley J. Earl, who hired him as a professional car designer. At GM, he worked on six models of the Chevrolet Corvette including the 1956-57 four-headlamp facelift model as well as the 1955 Cadillac Eldorado Brougham and 1957 Buick Special. At GM Cumberford also worked the company's layout standards for instruments and controls. And at GM he purchased his first car, a Volkswagen Beetle, moving soon to a Porsche 356.

Leaving GM, Cumberford studied philosophy for one year at UCLA, drove across Mexico and then the United States in a VW Microbus, subsequently moving to Mexico and working as a freelance design consultant to various industries.

In 1959, he was design assistant to noted automotive and industrial designer Albrecht Goertz. In 1962 and 63, Cumberford was chief designer with the racing team Holman Moody. In the early 1960s, Cumberford would also have a series of satirical renderings along with a fictional story published in Motor Trend featuring his and childhood friend Stand Mott's work – forecasting possible designs for the much discussed forthcoming "small Chevrolet," what would become the Corvair.

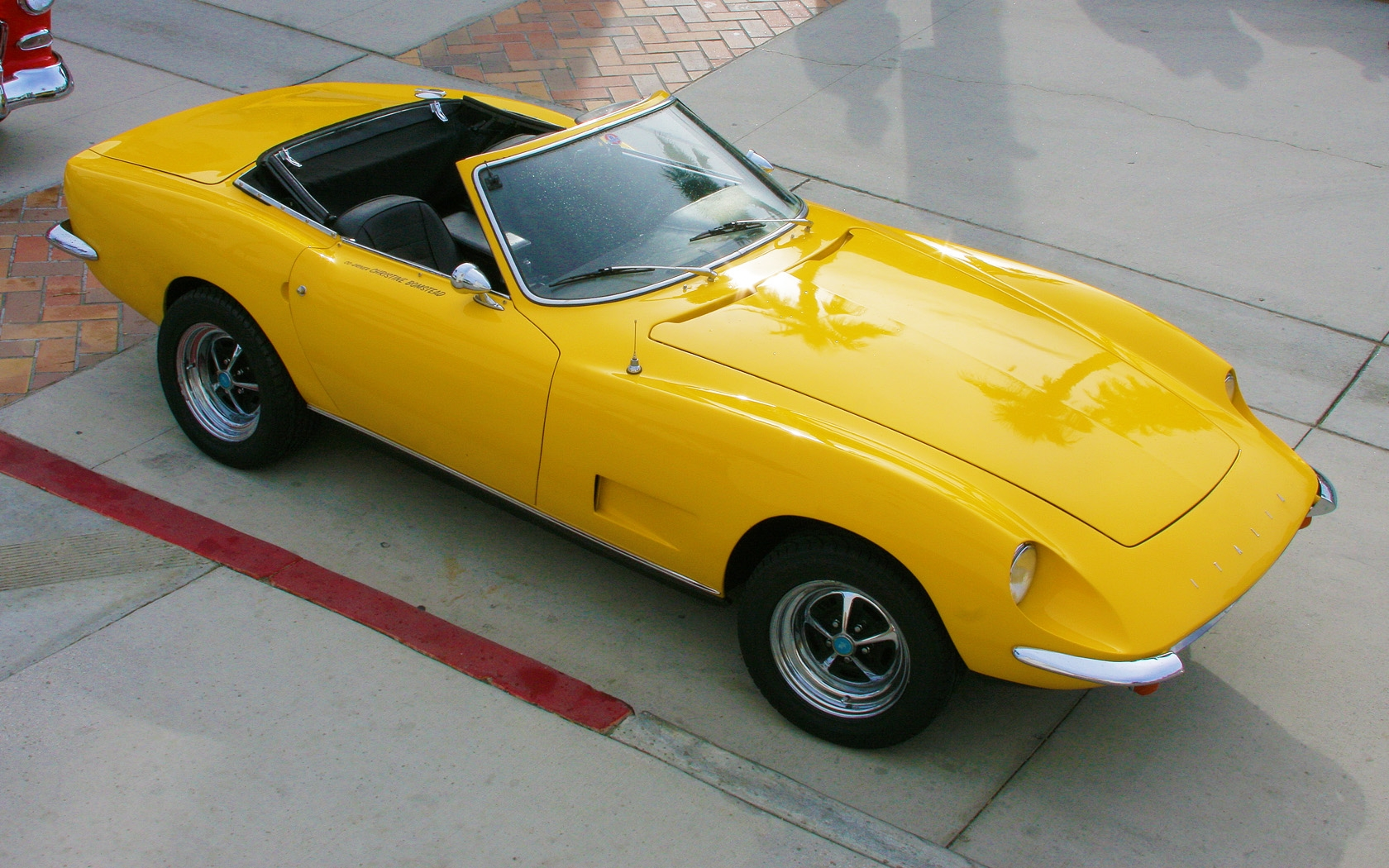
1967 Italia by Intermeccanica - exterior design by Robert Cumberford

He has lived in France, Mexico, and Switzerland – and has designed automobiles (including the Saab 850 and Renault Arquitectonicaro) race cars, trucks, aircraft, boats, and hovercraft with his companies Cumberford Design International (with offices in New York, Mexico City and Northampton England) and Cumberford Creative – working in the suburbs of Paris from 1996 to 1999 on projects for Renault and Citroën.

In 1986 Cumberford began contributing to the then new Automobile magazine at the request of editor David E. Davis, joining the magazine in its sixth issue with his column By Design, which was expanded to two full pages in 2006. He was the European Editor for Air Progress, magazine, continues to contribute to Automobile and Design magazine, and is a noted author – participating in a wide spectrum of forums, design competitions and events related to the automotive, aeronautical and design industries.

Cumberford authored the 2006 book Auto Legends: Classics of Style And Design; the 2001 book Chris Bangle: BMW Global Design and the 2008 book Cars, the latter printed in Italian. He contributed to the 2013 book Automotive Jewelry, Volume One: Mascots, Badges.

Cumberford was keynote speaker at "The Italian Avantgarde in Car Design" as part of the September 2002 exposition on Italian design in New York, and moderated the 2007 Classic Car Forum at the Pebble Beach Concours with Moray Callum, Andrea Zagato, Shiro Nakamura, Ed Welburn, and Ian Callum. He contributed to the catalogue for the North Carolina Museum of Art 2013 show "Porsche by Design: Seducing Speed."

As a judge, Cumberford participated in the 1988 Automobile Quarterly Car Design Contest; the second annual (2003) World Automotive Design Competition and Design Forum hosted by the Canadian International AutoShow (CIAS); the Best Design School 2003; the 2005 Canadian International AutoShow; and the fourth annual (2005) World Automotive Design Competition.

== Awards ==
In 2013 Cumberford won the 2013 Best Article of the Year Award from the Motor Press Guild for his article, "GM's Road Not Taken" about the LaSalle II Roadster, published in Automobile magazine in March 2013.

His work in Automobile magazine has won numerous International Automotive Media Awards, including: 2000, (Gold) for his article on Bob Gregorie; 2005, article about the 1935 Stout Scarab; 2007 for his article "Best of Show"; 2010, for the By Design column (Silver); and 2013 (Gold), for the By Design column.

== Cumberford Martinique ==
In 1982, with backing from a computer company, Cumberford designed a flamboyant front-engine, rear-drive two-seater of which two examples were crafted as development prototypes – with body of cast and sheet aluminum; African Mahogany fenders; a 3.2-liter, in-line, BMW-sourced, six-cylinder engine; as well as steering and suspension components from a Citroën CX. Two prototypes were constructed in Stamford, Connecticut, with one displayed in a San Diego museum for a period and another kept in Cumberford's garage in France. With the two-seater appearing on the cover of Car and Driver magazine in April 1982, the intention had been to market as many as 300 of the cars (as the – to Cumberford Martinque) but only the prototypes were manufactured – with an overall investment of approximately $3.5 million. Funding dried up after John DeLorean was indicted in a completely unrelated automotive scandal. Cumberford later drove one of the Martiniques from Austin, Texas, to Pebble Beach, California, in 1985, and both still exist today.
