= Eliška Junková =

Czech racing driver (1900–1994)

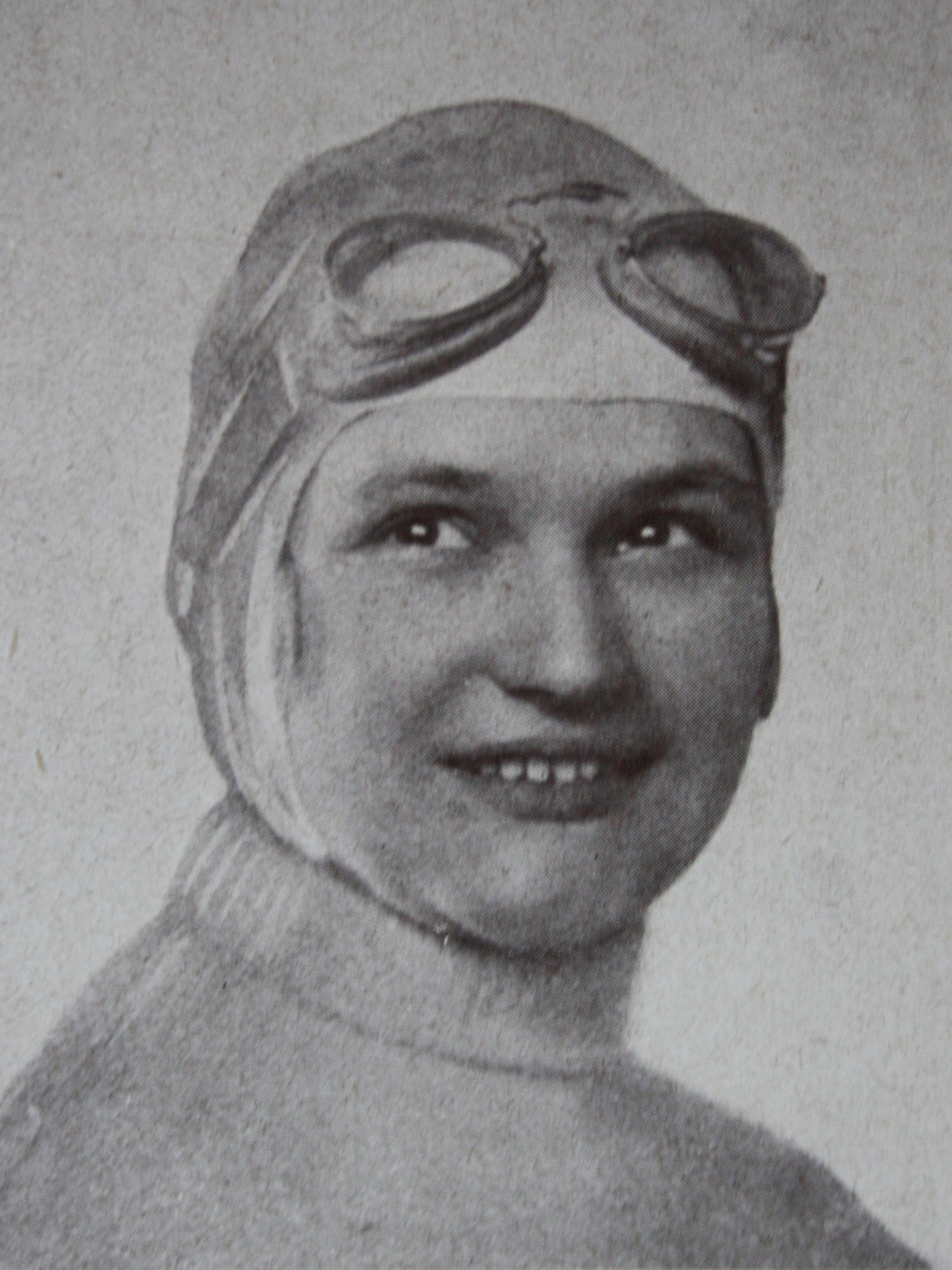
- Born: Alžběta Pospíšilová; 16 November 1900; Olomouc, Austria-Hungary
- Died: 5 January 1994 (aged 93); Prague, Czech Republic
- Spouse(s): Vincenc "Čeněk" Junek; Ladislav Khás

Signature
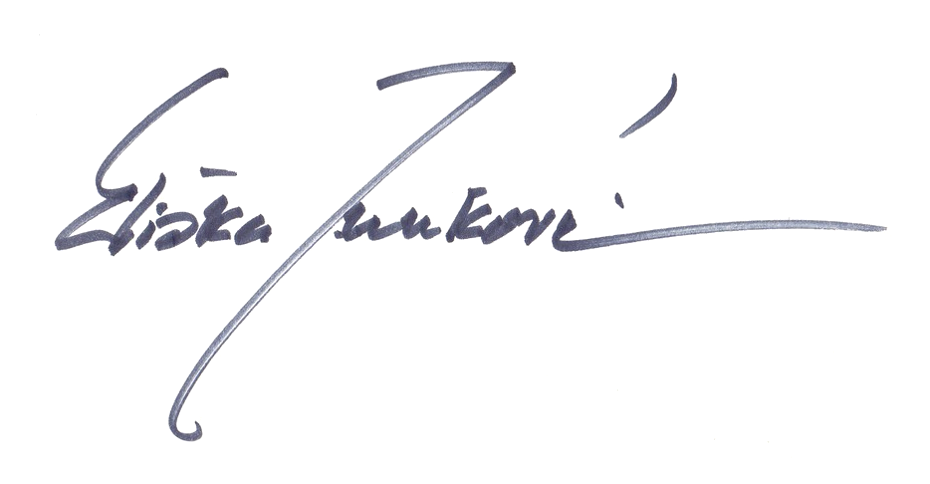

Eliška Junková-Khásová (born Alžběta Pospíšilová; 16 November 1900 – 5 January 1994), also known as Elisabeth Junek, was a Czech automobile racer. She is regarded as one of the most significant drivers in Grand Prix motor racing history, and was the first woman to win a Grand Prix event.

== Early life ==
Junková was born on 16 November 1900, in Olomouc, Moravia, Austria-Hungary listed in the registrar's office as Bětka ("Betty") Pospíšilová.

The sixth of eight children, born to a locksmith in Olomouc, she was nicknamed smíšek at an early age for her ever-present smile. Following the end of World War I, when her native Moravia became part of the new republic of Czechoslovakia, she found work in the Olomouc branch of the Pražská úvěrová banka (Prague Credit Bank) thanks to her multilingual skills, honed through her desire to travel the world.

At the age of sixteen, Junková got a job at a bank, where she met young banker Vincenc "Čeněk" Junek. He was several years older than her, and the two soon began a courtship. Upon her marriage to Vincenc she changed her first name to Eliška ("Beth") and her surname Junková (the feminine of Junek in Czech)

Work took her first to Brno, then Prague, then abroad to France and Gibraltar, although bureaucracy prevented her travelling as far as North Africa, London or Ceylon, as had been her original intention. She returned to Paris to be reunited with her partner, who by this time had become wealthy enough to indulge in his automotive passions. Eliška later said, "If he is going to be the love of my life, then I better learn to love these damned engines." But she too soon fell for the charms of sports cars of the time, especially Bugattis. They returned to Prague in 1922, where she took clandestine driving lessons to obtain her license. Meanwhile, Čeněk had started racing in earnest. He won the Zbraslav–Jíloviště hillclimb in 1922, the year they finally married.

== Racing career ==
They purchased a Mercedes that same year, and then a Bugatti Type 30 which had previously been raced in the French Grand Prix. Initially she served as riding mechanic to her husband, but a hand injury incurred during the war affected his ability to shift gears, and this afforded her the opportunity to take the wheel in his place. Eliška's first professional race was in 1923, with Čeněk at her side. The following year, she raced by herself, winning her class at the Lochotín–Třemošná hillclimb event which made her a national celebrity overnight. She then placed first at Zbraslav–Jíloviště in 1925, and the Juneks bought a second Bugatti to celebrate, together building a close friendship with Ettore Bugatti. By 1926, Eliška Junková was confident enough to compete in races throughout Europe. She gained fame across the continent, garnering the nickname Queen of the Steering Wheel, and in the racing press of the day, Eliška became anglicized to Elizabeth.

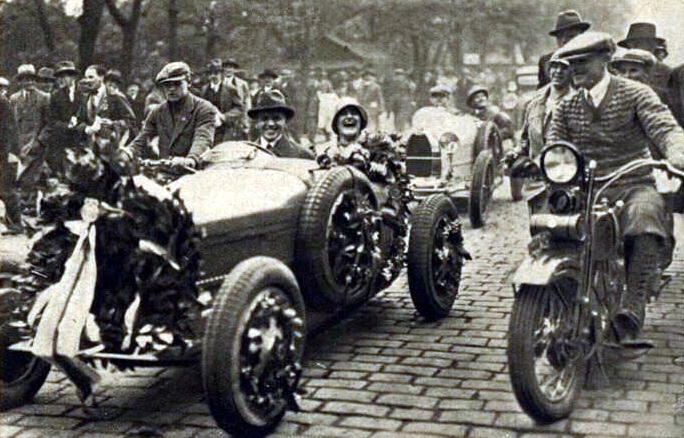
Junková (center) in Prague after the Targa Florio race in Sicily, 1928

In 1926, she was runner up in the Klausenpass hill climb in Switzerland. She was easily identifiable for always racing in a blue skirt, white blouse, helmet and goggles.

Eliška was a technical driver, and she is often credited for being one of the first drivers to walk round a course before an event, noting landmarks and checking out the best line through the corners.

=== 1927 Targa Florio ===
She competed in the Targa Florio in Sicily for the first time in 1927, driving a 2.3-litre Bugatti Type 35B with her husband as accompanying mechanic-passenger. This was a tough 8-hour race over mountain roads, where stamina was as necessary as speed, due to the demands of the rough and often muddy course. That year, the race was five laps of the 108 km circuit for a total of 540 km. With a strong start, at the end of the first lap, her elapsed time of 1h27m placed her fourth just ten seconds behind the works Bugatti of Emilio Materassi and ahead of the works Maserati and Peugeot. However, her impressive run ended abruptly a third of the way into the next lap when the steering gear broke, throwing them off the road. Fortunately, neither was injured and they were picked up and brought back to the startline pits by fellow driver Saverio Candrilli. This performance garnered great respect from her contemporary drivers and the spectators alike.

Shortly thereafter, she won the Brno-Soběšice hillclimb and then also won the two-litre sports car class of the German Grand Prix at the new Nürburgring circuit, and the 50-kilometer ladies handicap organized in Montlhéry during the 24 hours of Paris.

=== 1928 Targa Florio ===
With her sights firmly set on winning the 1928 Targa Florio, she acquired a new Type 35B to keep her competitive with the top male racers. Race organiser Conte Vincenzo Florio arranged for Vincenzo Gargotta, one of his press officers and a local resident, to accompany her on sighting laps around the course. Periodically she would stop to put chalk marks on posts, walls and trees along the route. This year, there was a strong field with works entries from Bugatti, Maserati and Alfa Romeo. On race day, the cars were flagged off at two-minute intervals, with Junková starting well into the second half of the grid, coincidentally just ahead of Candrilli again. The fastest car on the first lap was Louis Chiron in his works Bugatti, followed by Giuseppe Campari in an Alfa Romeo and Chiron's teammate Albert Divo. Junková was a remarkable fourth on elapsed time, barely 30 seconds behind Chiron, showing her skill and the value of her meticulous preparation. On the second lap, Chiron pushed too hard and went off. Divo had pitted and this put Junková into the overall lead, having passed many of the twenty cars that had started ahead of her. Divo, an experienced Grand Prix veteran, had started just ahead of her, and, by now following closely, she was ahead of him on elapsed time. Meanwhile, Campari pushed very hard to take the lead by the end of the third lap after four and a half hours. He built his lead, only to lose time with a puncture and driving the last 10 kilometres on the wheel rim. Going into the final lap, Junková was still in second and had closed to within a minute, with Divo ten seconds back on elapsed time. Campari crossed the line first of the leaders, but as he had started forty minutes ahead, everyone waited for the rest to arrive to determine the actual winner. First to appear was Conte Caberto Conelli in his works Bugatti T37, finishing faster than Campari. Divo came through faster still and eyes were looking for "Miss Bugatti" (as the locals called her). It was not to be, as in the last half of the lap she had suffered a puncture, losing two vital minutes while her husband, as mechanic, changed the tyre. The stop also overheated the engine and they were stymied by loss of radiator water, so she had to ease back to nurse the car home. She finished a creditable fifth out of only twelve finishers, eventually almost nine minutes behind the winner, Divo, and beating 25 other top drivers, including the likes of Luigi Fagioli, René Dreyfus, Ernesto Maserati and Tazio Nuvolari.

In his book My Two Lives, Dreyfus says:

Her tenacity and determination were remarkable. For this event, she travelled to Sicily with a governess and a car like the one with which she would compete, a full month before the race. She began slowly, one lap one day, two laps the next and so on - she must have put up thirty or forty laps in that car. She knew the course better than anybody. She really pounded her Bugatti; it was a very used car by race day, but she had thought ahead of course and the Bugatti team arrived with the new car she had ordered, a T35B painted black and yellow and arranged to have delivered to the course. She was ready with her plan. In the early laps of the race she started to scare the wits out of the other drivers - being beaten by a woman was unthinkable then - and she was up with the leaders until the final lap. What she hadn't considered in all her careful pre-race calculations and what she couldn't have foreseen, was that mechanical problems might interfere with her plan. When they did, she was forced to drop back. Still, she finished fifth - a terrific showing. Nobody who was in that Targa, ever forgot that formidable Lady.

Vincenzo Florio warmly congratulated her at the finish and, begging Divo's pardon, called her the moral victor of the day.

== Retirement from racing ==
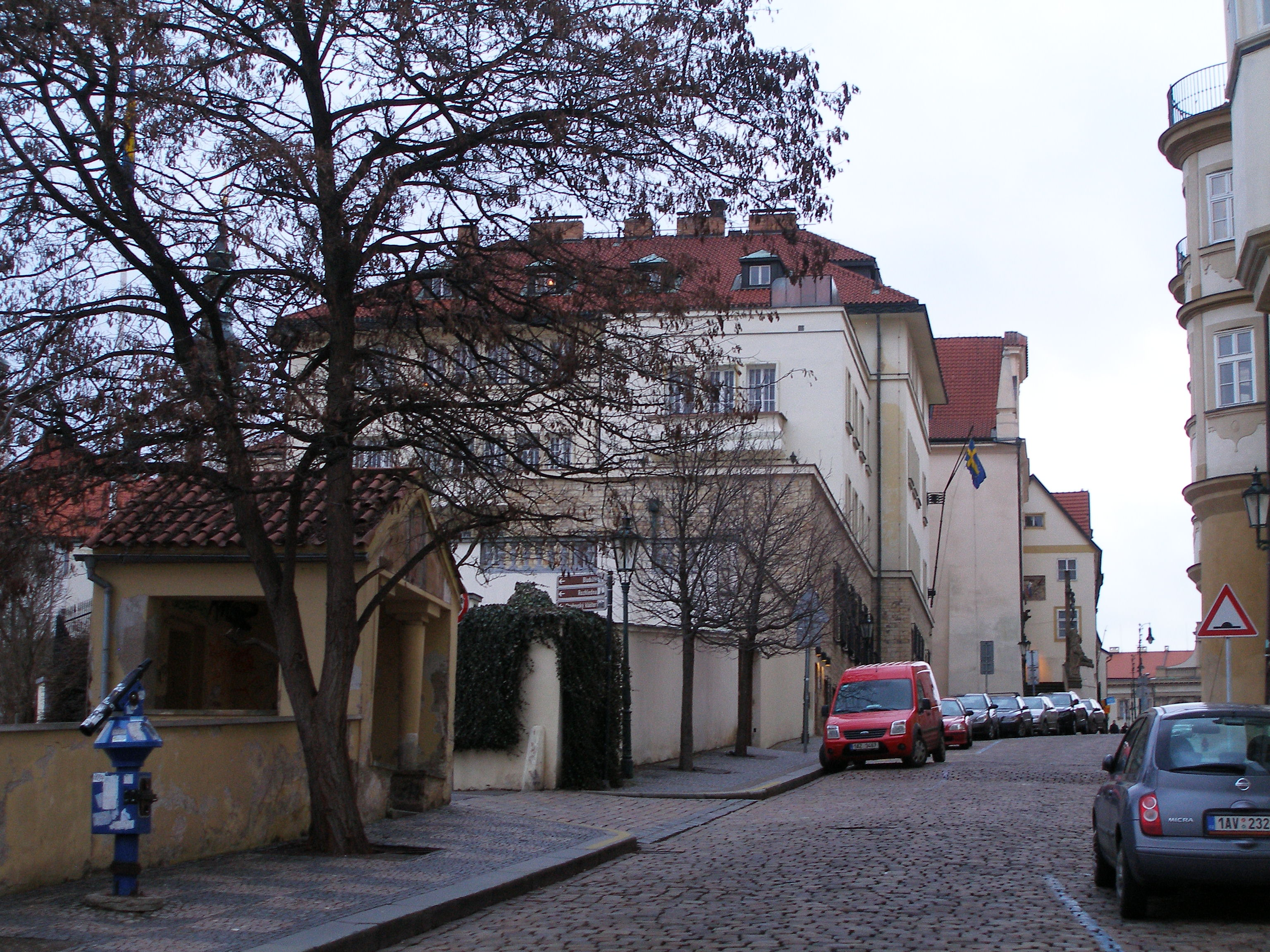
The house where Eliška Junková lived

Two months later, back at the Nürburgring, she shared the driving with her husband in the German Grand Prix (that year run as a sports-car race). On the fifth lap, having just changed places with her, Vincent was rushing to make up lost time after a tyre change. He went wide at the Breitscheid corner, hitting a rock and rolling. Although thrown out of the car, he collapsed and died soon after from a head injury. Junková was devastated — she gave up racing and sold her vehicles.

== Travelling ==
Junková now returned to her first passion of travelling. Ettore Bugatti himself gave her a new touring car for her journey to Ceylon and hired her to seek out new business opportunities in Asia.

In 1929, Junek spent three months travelling 6000km across difficult terrain to drive two Bugatti Type 44 cars to India as part of a promotional campaign. She wasn't very complimentary in her analysis of the cars' performance on the journey but did to sell the two Bugattis on arrival (one car still survives).

== Later life ==
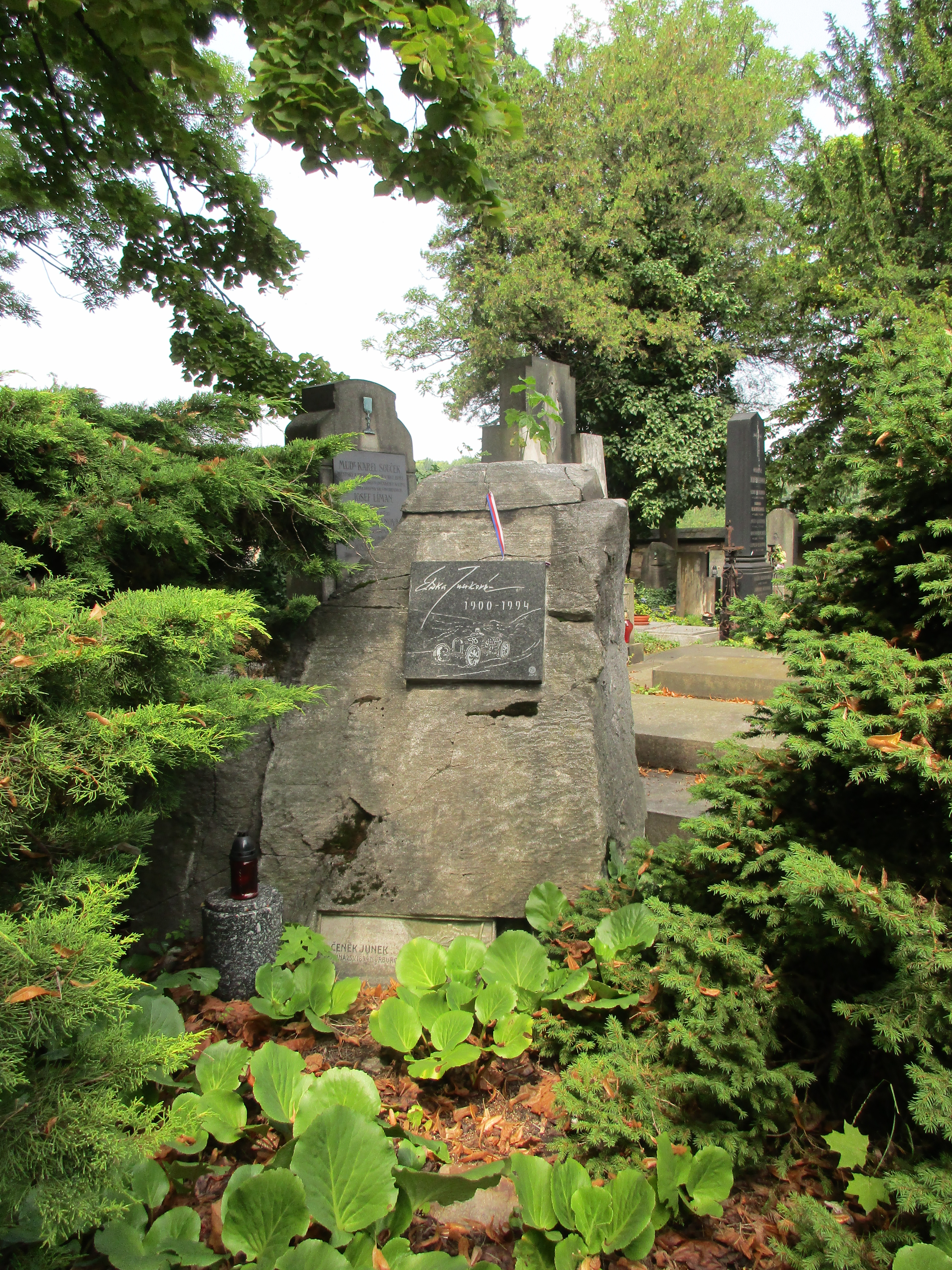
Grave of Junková at Vinohrady Cemetery

Eliška eventually found love again and married Czech writer Ladislav Khás shortly after the Second World War. But from 1948 to 1964, the communist authorities, disapproving of the high-flying, "bourgeois" lifestyle that she had lived, refused to allow her to travel abroad. Like Hellé Nice, her great female counterpart from France, she was largely forgotten by the motor racing world. In 1969 she attended the 40th anniversary of the Bugatti Owners' Club in Great Britain. In 1972, she published her autobiography Má vzpomínka je Bugatti ("My memory is Bugatti").

In 1970 she was the inspiration for the founding of the Český automobilový klub žen [Czech Women’s Automobile Club] which is still active today.

She lived well into her nineties, long enough for the Iron Curtain to fall and for the "Queen of the Steering Wheel" to have her place in automotive racing history be recognized. In 1989, at the age of 89, she attended a Bugatti reunion in the United States as the guest of honour.

In 1990, Porsche design chief Anatole Lapine and Automobile magazine editor Jean Jennings drank Johnnie Walker Red with her in her apartment in the Swedish Embassy in Prague, where she recounted her racing history, including her 1928 race in the Sicilian Targa Florio in a supercharged 2.3-liter Bugatti Type35B.

Junková died in Prague on 5 January 1994, aged 93. She is buried at the Vinohrady Cemetery.

== Legacy ==
On 28 June 2016, the mayor of Prague 1 conveyed the honorary citizenship of Prague 1 posthumously to Eliška Junková.

On 16 November 2020, her 120th birthday, Google recognized her by featuring a doodle with an image of her in a racecar.
