= Jean Jennings =

American automotive writer (1954–2024)

- Born: Jean Marie Lienert; February 3, 1954; Detroit, Michigan, U.S.
- Died: December 16, 2024 (aged 70); Jackson, Michigan, U.S.
- Occupations: Writer, Car and Driver (1980–1985); Writer, cofounder Automobile (1985–2014); Editor-in-chief, Automobile (2000–2014); President, Automobile (2006–2014); Founder, JeanKnowsCars (2012–2016); Correspondent, Good Morning America
- Spouse(s): Thomas (Tom) Mason Lindamood (m. 1979, divorced) Timothy (Tim) P. Jennings
- Writing career
- Pen name: Jean Lindamood; Jean Lindamood Jenkins
- Genre: Automotive journalism
- Website: www.jeanknowscars.com (2012-2016, dormant)

Jean Marie Jennings (née Lienert; February 3, 1954 – December 16, 2024), also known as Jean Lindamood, was an American journalist, publisher and television personality covering the automotive industry. She focused on making the industry more accessible for others and for mentoring new automotive writers, editors and designers.

After writing for Car and Driver (1980–1985), she co-founded Automobile, where she continued to write her column Vile Gossip after becoming the magazine's editor in chief (2000–2014) and president (2006–2014).

She was the automotive correspondent for Good Morning America (1994–2000) and the Oxygen network. She was later the Chairman, CEO and host of the self-branded automotive website and blog, JeanKnowsCars (2012–2016), wrote articles for LinkedIn, and edited the book Road Trips, Head Trips, and Other Car-Crazed Writings. She guested on The Tonight Show with Jay Leno, convinced Jerry Seinfeld to freelance an article for Automobile magazine,; hosted her website JeanKnowsCars.com along with its corollary Youtube channel; and continued to write the Vile Gossip column intermittently for Autoblog.com (2020).

With Jennings as editor and President, Automobile was the first car magazine to win a National Magazine Award — for a column by Jamie Kitman. Jennings herself was honored by the Detroit Press Club Foundation; won the Motor Press Guild’s 2016 Dean Batchelor Award for Lifetime Achievement; was a 2021 inductee to the Michigan Journalism Hall of Fame and won the Ken Purdy Award for Excellence in Automotive Journalism.

David E. Davis, with whom Jennings co-founded Automobile magazine, said Jennings "changed the nature of the readers' response" to automotive journalism.

== Background ==
Jennings was born in Detroit on February 3, 1954. She grew up in a Catholic family with five brothers on a farm near New Baltimore, Michigan, the daughter of Audrey Jean Lienert (née Gagnon) and Robert Marcellus Lienert. Her father had a master's degree in journalism from Northwestern, was a copy editor at the Detroit Free Press, and later became the editor of Automotive News. Her oldest brother, Paul Lienert, became a noted automotive journalist, managing editor of AutoWeek, and a correspondent for Thomson Reuters. Jennings once described her family as "the Barrymores of automotive writing."

Having learned about cars from her father, Jennings recalled that he routinely brought home new and interesting cars for his work. He once took her, age 7, and two brothers for a test drive from their house in a brand new supercharged Studebaker Avanti — driving it inadvertently into a ditch at high speed but quickly recovering to the pavement before returning home, noting that their mother was not to hear the details of the test drive.

At 14, Jennings was an exchange student in Ecuador where she learned to drive in a Jeep-like Toyota, in the Andes mountains. She attended St. Mary's Queen of Creation school from 1960 to 1970, and later attended the University of Michigan (1970-1972), dropping out after three incomplete semesters.

Jean Jennings,
on her experiences as a taxi driver:

"I was working at the Post Office and I really hated it. I was a hippie back then, living in a house with a whole bunch of people. One of them said, “They need somebody to drive a cab and I can’t drive the all-night shift tonight.” I figured, it’s a desperate situation and I love driving. There was no training, none. I bought a used car and painted it yellow. I taught myself how to work on the car. It was a real fun thing. They’re just talking to you and then they give you money and it’s cash. If you needed money, all you had to do was get in the car and drive. On Friday, I would go out, make enough money to go buy beer, and then go home."

"Once on the road, it was as you would expect. Old ladies wanted me to drive slowly, special needs kids wanted me to drive as fast as possible and honk the horn a lot, and out of town conventioneers told me rape jokes while sitting directly behind my head as I drove them to the airport.

Once I picked up a guy who made every hair on my body stand up when he got in the back seat. I secretly opened the mic button and talked for my life all the way to his (bad neighborhood) destination. The next day I read in the paper that he’d escaped from the State Hospital, murdered his wife, then he called a cab. Mine.

I took a bank robber to a local town to rob a bank. I picked up the actor Jason Robards. I carried a drunk whose head was covered in blood from a bottle fight over my shoulder and into his house. I propped him on the toilet and cleaned him off with alcohol while he screamed bloody murder."

At eighteen, she became a taxi driver. She bought a used Plymouth Satellite with a 318 V-8, painted it yellow, installed a roof light and a meter, and joined the Yellow Cab Company in Ann Arbor, Michigan, as an owner/operator. When that car was totaled, her second cab was a Plymouth Fury, also with a 318 V8. While at Yellow Cab, she redefined the city taxicab boundaries, trained and created a training manual for new cab drivers, and was elected president of the Yellow Cab board. She married Tom Lindamood, a taxi dispatcher, in 1979. Five years later, with the taxi driving having become increasingly dangerous, Jennings became a driver at Chrysler's Chelsea Proving Grounds and later worked at Chrysler's Impact Lab, where she crashed cars, test drove cars, welded, and wrote for its award-winning union newsletter.

In 2014, Jennings co-founded the annual Caden's Car Show with C.S. Mott Children's Hospital, celebrating the life of eleven-year-old Caden Bowles, a car enthusiast who died while waiting for a heart transplant. Jennings had Type 2 Diabetes, sat on the board of directors of the Metro Detroit and Southeast Michigan chapter of the Juvenile Diabetes Research Foundation, and had emceed the organization's Promise Ball Gala.

In a 2016 interview, she counted as large influences on her life a Catholic upbringing "with a heavy emphasis on reading, Latin, and the pursuit of nothing less than perfection" — along with a disruptive bent brought out by working on an underground newspaper; and a heavy desire to escape her dirt-road, middle-of-nowhere childhood, the latter facilitated by learning to drive at an early age. She nonetheless retired to a house "a dirt road in middle-of-nowhere Michigan" with her husband, Tim Jennings.

Jennings died from complications of Alzheimers disease on December 16, 2024, at age 70.

== Career ==
In 1980, at her brother Paul's encouragement, one month after she was laid off at Chrysler, she applied at Car and Driver and was hired as a staff writer by editor David E. Davis (1930–2011). Though she considers herself a poor automotive prognosticator, in the November 1984 issue of Car and Driver, she presciently ended her Oldsmobile Calais review, "won't it be embarrassing if, twenty years hence, the division goes under because all its customers have died?" The division folded sixteen years later, in 2000.

In 1985 she left Car and Driver with Davis, co-founding Automobile magazine and becoming its first executive editor. Under the motto "No Boring Cars," the magazine competed directly with three other successful automotive magazines, Motor Trend, Car and Driver and Road & Track with heavier stock paper and the only one of the four to be perfect bound (not stapled) , with four-color printed photography and ground-breaking art direction. Within a year, the other three major car magazines changed to perfect binding and full color printing, hiring new editors and art directors as well. She became Editor-in-Chief in 2000 at Automobile, and President in 2006.

At Automobile, Jennings became known for her automotive adventures with some of the most prominent and important people in and out of automotive culture. She spent 9,000 miles in the first of Brock Yates' One Lap of America with Parnelli Jones in a panel van disguised as a Stroh's Brewery truck; was close to auto writer and racer Denise McCluggage for 30 years; mooned race car drivers Dan Gurney and Phil Hill; drove to the top of the world with Swedish rally driver Erik Carlsson; spent a day in 1990 and drank Johnnie Walker Red with Porsche design chief Tony Lapine and 90-year old champion Bugatti driver Eliška Junková (Elizabeth Junek) at her apartment in the Swedish embassy in Prague, just after the Berlin Wall fell; rode motorcycles across China with Malcolm Smith; followed the Camel Trophy in Madagascar; raced in Baja with a Russian circle-track driver; navigated in the 2000-mile Pirelli-Classic Marathon vintage rally in a 1965 MGB across the Alps with Stirling Moss; and in 1983 drove a yellow prototype C4 Corvette with Chuck Yeager.

Irrepressible and inimitable, Jennings once transformed herself into an undercover spokesmodel at the 1988 North American International Auto Show, reciting a memorized sales pitch for the Eagle Premier — wearing a copper lamé gown, heavily teased hair and such heavily glamorized makeup she was left largely unrecognizable. In 1988, at Good Morning America she startled Diane Sawyer, live on air, after calling the new Chevrolet SSR, "bitchin", explaining to the clearly ruffled Sawyer that it was an acceptable California hot-rodding term. She taught an Oprah Winfrey Show audience how to change a tire and jump start a car.

Jennings was periodically estranged from Davis, whom she described on his death in 2011 as "the most interesting, most difficult, cleverest, darkest, most erudite, dandiest, and most inspirational, charismatic and all-around damnedest human being I will ever meet. I have loved him. I have seriously not loved him." For his part, Davis said on a televised show "I sometimes dream of a FedEx flight on its way to Memphis flying over Parma where she lives and a grand piano falling out of the airplane and whistling down through the air, this enormous object, and lands on her and makes the damnedest chord anybody has ever heard; this sound of music that has never been heard by the human ear. And the next morning all they can find . . . [are] some shards of wood and a grease spot and no other trace of Mrs. Jennings."

Jennings was profiled by Susan Orlean for The New Yorker, appeared on The Tonight Show with Jay Leno, and was a regular on-air contributor, including on Fox Business Network; CNBC's Closing Bell, Squawk Box, Behind the Wheel, and Power Lunch; MSNBC; CBS's This Morning and Evening News; and CNN's American Morning and Headline News.

In 2014, she was a judge for the ten-episode, Chevrolet-sponsored reality show Motor City Masters, which highlighted car-based design challenges.

In 2012, while still with Automobile, Jennings founded a self-branded website and blog, JeanKnowsCars, with the backing of Automobile's owner, Source Interlink, online and in 18 newspapers nationally. Source Interlink reshuffled its holdings in 2014, letting go of Jennings as Editor in Chief at Automobile and firing 90% of its staff. Her website and blog remained active until about 2018.

== Awards and recognition ==
Jennings received the 2016 New England Motor Press Association's Lifetime Achievement Award; the Motor Press Guild 2016 Lifetime Achievement Award and the 2007 International Motor Press Association annual Ken Purdy award for Excellence in Automotive Journalism for her June 2006 Automobile cover story, "Veyron in the USA."
