= Winding Road =

Winding Road may refer to:

- Winding Road (magazine), a digital automotive enthusiast magazine
- "Winding Road" (Ayaka and Kobukuro song), 2007
- "Winding Road" (Porno Graffitti song), 2006
- "Winding Road", a song by Ayumi Hamasaki from the album My Story
- The Winding Road, a 1920 British silent film
- Hairpin turn
