= James Hartzell =

American advertising copywriter (1931–2010)

- Born: December 25, 1931; Pittsburgh, Pennsylvania
- Died: September 11, 2010 (aged 78); Grosse Pointe, Michigan
- Occupation: Advertising copywriter

James W. Hartzell (December 25, 1931 – September 11, 2010) was an American advertising copywriter. He created many successful advertising campaigns. He is principally recalled for originating the 1974 "Baseball, Hot Dogs, Apple Pie and Chevrolet" campaign that Car and Driver and other publications have ranked as the best automobile commercial of all time. Car and Driver explained its pick of Hartzell's ad: "This was the game changer. It was to national television what the electric starter was to automobiles. It changed car commercials forever. It was the beginning of brand advertising as we know it and remains the best of it." Advertising legend David Ogilvy went even further, calling Hartzell's Chevrolet spot "his favorite commercial of all time, not merely his top car spot." In the 1960s, Hartzell also originated the "Ask the kid who owns one" campaign for the Camaro.
