= Jíloviště =

- Municipality
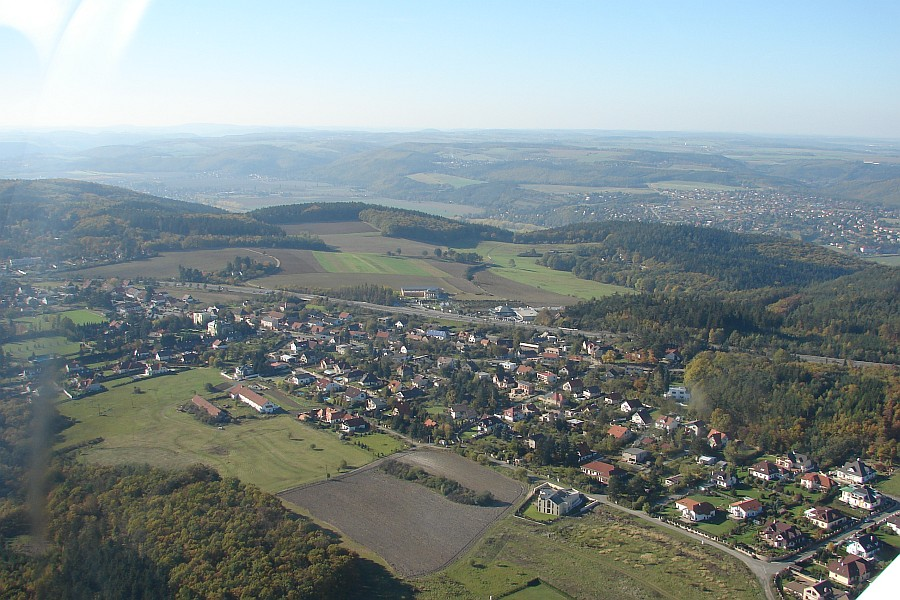
- Aerial view

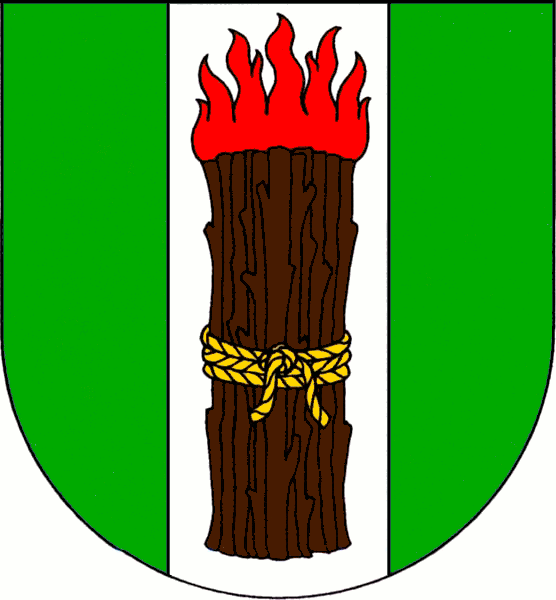
- Flag Coat of arms

- Location in the Czech Republic
- Coordinates: 49°55′39″N 14°20′34″E
- Country: Czech Republic
- Region: Central Bohemian
- District: Prague-West
- First mentioned: 1347

Area
  - Total: 14.01 km^{2} (5.41 sq mi)
- Elevation: 353 m (1,158 ft)

Population (2026-01-01)
  - Total: 689
  - Density: 49.2/km^{2} (127/sq mi)
- Time zone: UTC+1 (CET)
  - Summer (DST): UTC+2 (CEST)
- Postal code: 252 02
- Website: jiloviste.cz

Jíloviště is a municipality and village in Prague-West District in the Central Bohemian Region of the Czech Republic. It has about 700 inhabitants.

== Etymology ==
The name is derived from the Czech word jíl (i.e. 'clay') and translates as 'clay pit'.

== Geography ==
Jíloviště is located about 12 kilometres (7 mi) southwest of Prague. It lies mostly in the Brdy Highlands, only the southern and western part of the municipal territory extends into the Benešov Uplands. The highest point is the hill Kámen at 414 m (1,358 ft) above sea level. The Vrané Reservoir, built on the Vltava River, is located east of the municipality just outside the municipal territory. The Vltava briefly crosses the eastern part of the municipal territory. The Berounka River briefly flows along the western municipal border, outside the territory of Jíloviště.

== History ==
The first written mention of Jíloviště is in a deed of Zbraslav Monastery from 1347. The village was founded after 1342. The monastery owned Jíloviště until 1420, when the Hussites burned down the monastery. In 1420, the village was acquired by a lower noblemen Zikmund Bolechovec of Pušperk, but between 1471 and 1526, it became again a property of the Zbraslav Monastery.

In the mid-16th century, Jíloviště was described as abandoned, but it was repopulated in 1587 at the latest. Around 1639, during the Thirty Years' War, the village was burned down. The Zbraslav Monastery was abolished in 1785 and the estate was managed by the religious fund since then. In 1825, the Zbraslav estate was bought by Count Bedřich Jindřich Öettinger-Wallerstein. In 1848, Jíloviště became an independent municipality.

== Demographics ==
Historical population

Year	Pop.	±%
1869	239	—
1880	248	+3.8%
1890	258	+4.0%
1900	216	−16.3%
1910	227	+5.1%

Year	Pop.	±%
1921	227	+0.0%
1930	235	+3.5%
1950	352	+49.8%
1961	334	−5.1%
1970	355	+6.3%

Year	Pop.	±%
1980	410	+15.5%
1991	446	+8.8%
2001	587	+31.6%
2011	707	+20.4%
2021	742	+5.0%

Source: Censuses

== Transport ==
The D4 motorway from Prague to Písek runs through the municipal territory.

== Sights ==
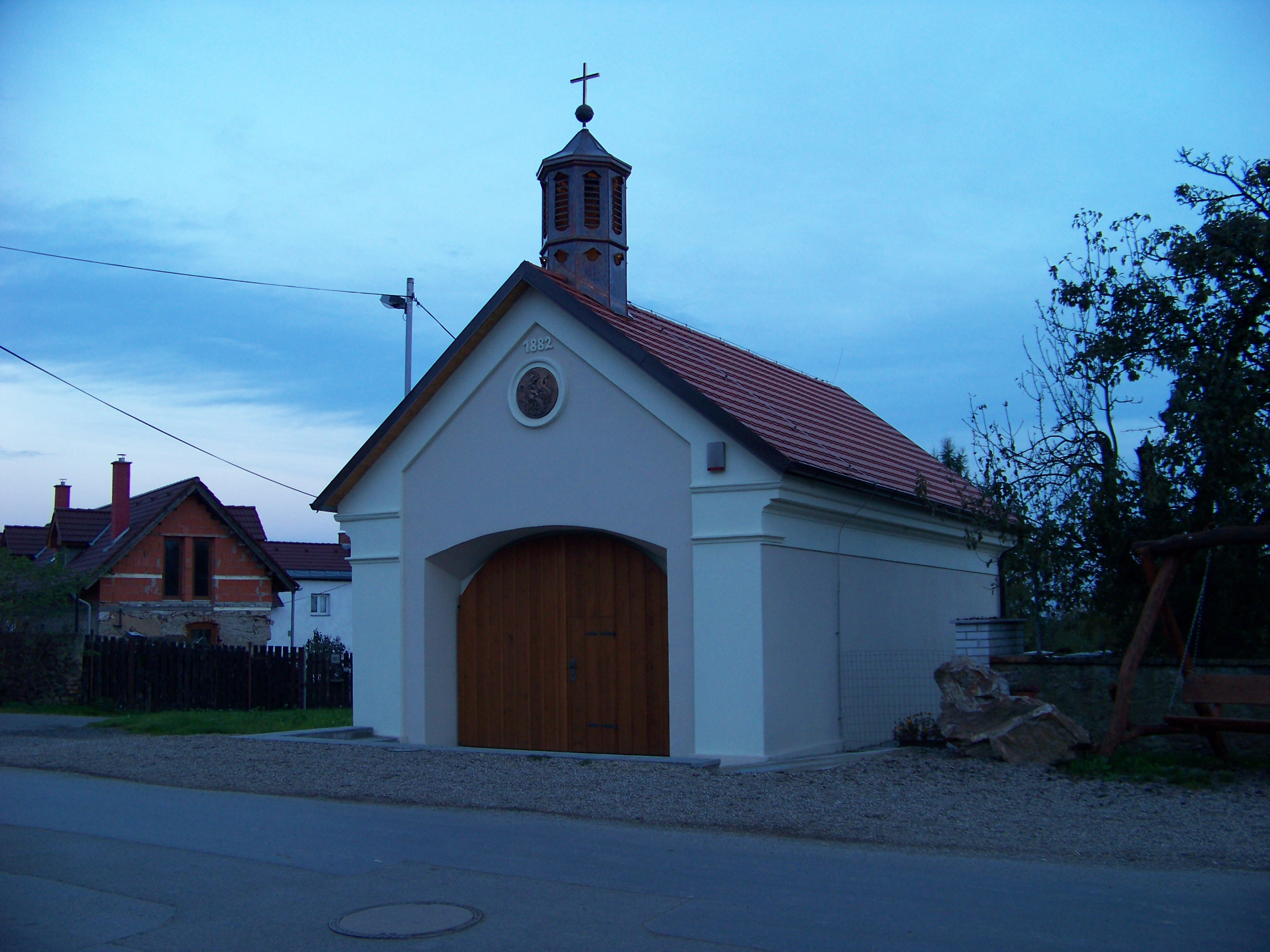
Chapel of Saint Florian

Among the protected cultural monuments in the municipality are the two gords called Humenská and Kazín. Only terrain remains have survived. The localities are archaeological sites.

The main cultural landmark is the Chapel of Saint Florian, located in the centre of Jíloviště. It was originally a firehouse, transformed into the chapel in 2014.
