= Winding Road (magazine) =

- Founded: 2005
- Headquarters: Austin, Texas, {{{location_country}}}
- Website: windingroad.com

Winding Road is a digital automotive enthusiast magazine owned by NextScreen LLC, of Austin, Texas, which also publishes various consumer electronics related titles digitally and in print.

== Overview ==
Winding Road's monthly digital magazine focuses on enthusiast-oriented vehicles, and passionate drivers. WindingRoad.com serves as a companion site for the magazine, offering daily industry news, timely new car drive reviews, and resources for the in-market auto consumer. Winding Road is freely available to read in its online form, or can be had as an advertisement-free PDF file for purchase at NextNewsStand.com. Mobile versions of Winding Road can also be had for the Apple iPad and the Amazon Kindle.

== Background ==
The magazine has been published continuously online since January 2005, beginning life as the brainchild of NextScreen CEO Thomas B. Martin. In early 2006, Martin brought an instant dose of industry credibility to Winding Road by hiring David E. Davis Jr. in the role of Editor-In-Chief. Having spent decades at the helm of Car and Driver and Automobile Magazine, Davis brought the Winding Road editorial offices to Ann Arbor, MI. and greatly raised the profile of the digital publication. Davis stepped down as EIC in February 2008, briefly taking the role of Editor Emeritus before moving on to other pursuits within the automotive realm.

Tom Martin currently serves at the top of Winding Road's masthead as editorial director, with Bradley Iger as the editor-in-chief, and Chris Amos as multimedia editor.

== Content ==
Winding Road focuses on content relating to driving involvement. The webzine launched its Involvement Index in February 2010 using a multipoint scoring formula to rank vehicles based on overall levels of feedback while driving. The Involvement Index was revamped towards the end of 2010 to include a more refined scoring formula.

== See also ==
- Car and Driver
- Road & Track
