= Center for Automotive Research =

United States nonprofit research organization

The Center for Automotive Research (CAR) is a nonprofit research organization based in Ann Arbor, Michigan, United States. It conducts research, forecasts trends, develops new methodologies, and advises on public policy.

== History ==
Before its current status as an independent nonprofit research organization, CAR was part of the University of Michigan, under the name Office for the Study of Automotive Transportation, which was a unit of the university's Transportation Research Institute.

In 2003, the Center for Automotive Research (CAR) was established as an independent non-profit research organization. CAR creates economic and systems modeling research, develops new manufacturing methodologies, forecasts industry futures, advises on public policy, and conducts industry conferences and forums. The institute is sometimes quoted by media for comments on industry issues.

As an example of its economic research, CAR chairman emeritus David Cole said in relation to the Tesla Michigan dealership dispute: "The value of Tesla is all based on hype and not substance". He also said that the claims of GreenTech Automotive were "very inflated from reality" and likely designed to attract investors; in 2018, GreenTech Automotive filed for bankruptcy.

CAR also organises briefing seminars for industry participants, media and the general public.

== Research groups ==
CAR research is divided into three research groups: Industry, Labor & Economics; Manufacturing, Engineering & Technology; and Transportation Systems Analysis.

=== Industry, Labor, & Economics ===
The Industry, Labor, & Economics Group researches the intersection of the automotive industry, technology, economy, society, and public policy, and is home to CAR's Automotive Communities Partnership. Its research encompasses areas including employment, skills, and labor issues, automotive trade, global competitiveness, development in North America and in emerging economies, and quantifying the industry's economic contribution and industry trends.

=== Manufacturing, Engineering & Technology ===
The Manufacturing, Engineering & Technology Group focuses on evolving technologies and manufacturing engineering systems, primarily in the automotive industry. Its research supports improvements to vehicle development through research into manufacturing systems, tooling, and new technologies of car and light-truck bodies. Research is directed at reducing new vehicle development costs and lead time while improving product quality. Recent efforts have been aimed at technology assessment to support improved fuel economy through advanced powertrains and vehicle mass reduction. This group oversees several industry-led coalitions involving the automotive, utility, tooling, and materials industries.

=== Transportation Systems Analysis ===
The Transportation Systems Analysis group is concerned with the broad context within which motor vehicles operate. Much of this effort focuses on the planning and operation of transportation infrastructure, as well as on interactions between infrastructure, vehicles, and vehicle operators. Increasingly, this research includes communications technology as a key component of these interactions. In this area, the group is heavily involved in connected vehicle and intelligent transportation systems work. The group's goals are to help the automotive and transportation industries deploy technologies that enhance safety, improve mobility, contribute to economic vitality, and reduce the environmental consequences of transportation.
