= Motor Press Guild =

- Founded
- Type: Non-profit
- Location: Los Angeles, California
- Region served: North America
- Website: motorpressguild.org

The Motor Press Guild (MPG) is the largest professional automotive media association in North America. Based in Los Angeles, this non-profit association consists of professionals in motoring journalism and news media. Its purpose is to promote education and the exchange of information within the motoring press.

== Members ==
The Guild's members include staff and freelance journalists, photographers, broadcasters, and other media professionals, alongside public relations representatives from vehicle manufacturers, industry suppliers, aftermarket companies, consumer groups, governmental agencies, and motoring-related organizations. As of [year], the Guild has approximately 750 members working across various regions of the United States.

== Activities ==
The Motor Press Guild presents the Dean Batchelor Award, an annual accolade that recognizes outstanding achievements in automotive journalism.

In addition to the award, MPG publishes the MPG Membership Roster & Media Guide, a comprehensive annual publication that serves as a key resource for professionals within the automotive field. This guide contains an extensive directory of industry contacts, including media representatives, manufacturers, suppliers, and other relevant organizations, and is widely consulted by members of the motoring press and related industries.

== See also ==
- Center for Automotive Research
