= Automobile (magazine) =

American automotive magazine

- The June 2008 cover of Automobile featuring a Pontiac Solstice and a Volkswagen Scirocco
- Editor: Mike Floyd
- Categories: Automobile magazine
- Frequency: Monthly/10 issues per year
- Total circulation: 278,238 (2016)
- Founder: David E. Davis
- First issue: April 1986
- Final issue: February 2020
- Company: Motor Trend Group
- Country: United States
- Based in: Los Angeles
- Language: American English
- Website: www.automobilemag.com
- ISSN: 0894-3583
- OCLC: 31735584

Automobile was an American automobile magazine published from 1986 to 2020. It was founded in 1986 by a group of former Car and Driver employees, led by David E. Davis with support from Rupert Murdoch's News Corporation, using the credo No Boring Cars.

Automobile positioned itself more broadly than the other automotive publications, an editorial theme expanded by editor David E. Davis: the magazine de-emphasized instrumented tests and elaborate technical data, instead offering subjective, experiential reports; providing in-depth review of older cars with its Collectible Classics series; and offering styling analysis with its column by former General Motors designer Robert Cumberford.

In 1991, the magazine was acquired by K-III Communications (now Rent Group). In 2007, the publication was acquired by Source Interlink (later TEN: The Enthusiast Network). In 2017, it became part of Discovery Communications.

In December 2019, Discovery's subsidiary TEN Publishing announced the discontinuation of Automobile. Its final issue was dated February 2020.

== Awards ==
=== Automobile of the Year ===
From 1990 to 2014, Automobile awarded their "Automobile of the Year" to one car annually.

- 1990: Mazda MX-5 Miata
- 1991: Acura NSX
- 1992: Cadillac Seville Touring Sedan
- 1993: Chrysler Concorde / Dodge Intrepid / Eagle Vision
- 1994: Dodge / Plymouth Neon
- 1995: BMW M3
- 1996: Honda Civic
- 1997: Toyota RAV4
- 1998: Porsche Boxster
- 1999: Volkswagen New Beetle
- 2000: Ford Focus
- 2001: Chevrolet Corvette Z06
- 2002: Subaru Impreza WRX
- 2003: Nissan 350Z
- 2004: Mitsubishi Lancer Evolution
- 2005: Chrysler 300C
- 2006: BMW 3-Series
- 2007: Volkswagen GTI
- 2008: Audi R8
- 2009: Nissan GT-R
- 2010: Volkswagen GTI
- 2011: Chevrolet Volt
- 2012: Audi A7
- 2013: Tesla Model S
- 2014: Chevrolet Corvette Stingray

=== Automobile All-Stars ===
In 2015, Automobile replaced their "Automobile of the Year" award with the "Automobile All-Stars", naming multiple cars on the list annually.

- 2015: Alfa Romeo 4C, BMW i8, BMW 2-Series, Chevrolet Camaro Z/28, Ford Mustang, Honda Fit, Lamborghini Huracán, Mercedes-Benz C-Class, Subaru WRX / WRX STI, Volkswagen Golf GTI
- 2016: Ferrari 488 GTB, Ford Mustang Shelby GT350, Mazda MX-5 Miata, McLaren 570S, Porsche Cayman GT4, Volkswagen Golf R, Volvo XC90
- 2017: Acura NSX, BMW M2, Chevrolet Bolt EV, Honda Civic Hatchback Sport, Porsche 718 Cayman S, Volvo S90
- 2018: Ford GT, Honda Accord Sport 2.0T, Honda Civic Type R, Lexus LC 500, McLaren 720S, Mercedes-AMG GT R, Porsche 911 Carrera GTS, Volvo V90 T6 AWD
- 2019: BMW M2 Competition, Ferrari 812 Superfast, Hyundai Veloster N, McLaren 600LT, Mercedes-Benz G550, Nissan Altima SR 2.0T, Porsche 911 GT2 RS
- 2020: Bentley Continental GT V8, Chevrolet Corvette Stingray, Ferrari F8 Tributo, Ford Mustang Shelby GT500, Kia Telluride, Mazda3 Hatchback, Porsche 911 Carrera S, Toyota GR Supra

=== Design of the Year ===
- 1990: Nissan 300ZX
- 1991: Acura NSX
- 1992: Honda Civic VX Hatchback
- 1993: Mazda RX-7
- 1994: Saab 900
- 1995: Ferrari 456
- 1996: Ford Taurus
- 1997: GM EV1
- 1998: Chrysler Concorde
- 1999: BMW M Coupe
- 2000: Audi TT
- 2001: Alfa Romeo 156 Sportwagon
- 2002: Mercedes-Benz SL-Class
- 2003: BMW Z4
- 2004: Toyota Prius
- 2005: BMW 6-Series
- 2006: Pontiac Solstice
- 2007: Aston Martin V8 Vantage
- 2008: Audi R8
- 2009: Audi A5
- 2010: Nissan Cube
- 2011: Jaguar XJ
- 2012: Fisker Karma
- 2013: Porsche Boxster
- 2014: BMW i8
- 2015: Mercedes-Benz S-Class Coupe
- 2016: Ford GT
- 2017: Volvo S90
- 2018: Tesla Model 3
- 2019: BMW 8-Series
- 2020: Porsche Taycan
