= Devin Battley =

American motorcycle racer (1950–2025)

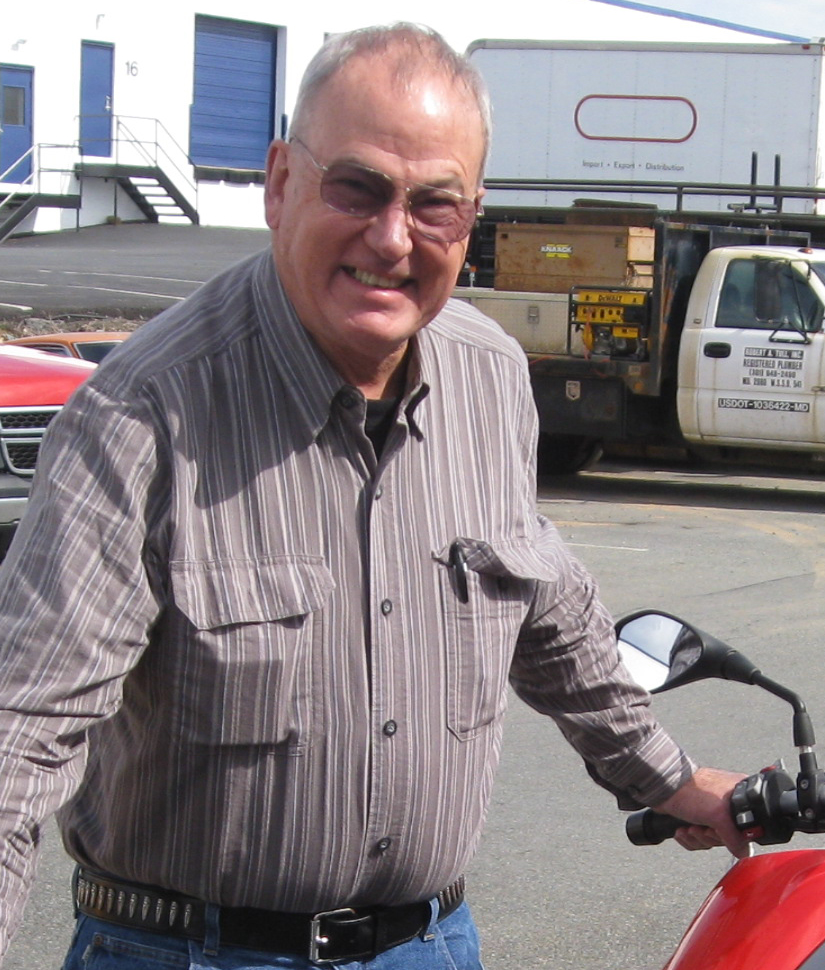
- Battley at his motorcycle dealership in 2013
- Born: August 31, 1950; Arlington, Virginia, U.S.
- Died: December 3, 2025 (aged 75)
- Occupations: Motorcycle racer; Businessman
- Website: www.battley.com

Devin Battley (August 31, 1950 – December 3, 2025) was an American businessman known for his involvement with motorcycles as a racer and as a dealer. From an early age, Battley enjoyed racing motorcycles and participated in many national championships. He helped to orchestrate Harley-Davidson's interest in Buell motorcycles, and he sold motorcycles to King Hussein of Jordan and Mike Tyson. In early 2022, Battley announced that he would run for County Executive of Montgomery County, Maryland.

== 1981–1999: Racing career ==
From 1981 to 1984, Battley raced in the Battle of the Twins (later, Pro Twins), part of the AMA Professional Road Racing series, as well as:

58th Laconia Classic, Battle of the Twins, Laconia NH, June 20, 1981, 1st place Stock Production
AMA Superbike Championship Series: Final Round, Daytona Beach FL, October 3–4, 1981, finished second place Stock Production class but won the championship
Battle of the Twins, Talladega, Alabama, March 14, 1982, 5th place Expert Modified class
AMA Superbike Championship Series: Final Round, West Palm Beach FL, October 10, 1982, second place Grand Prix class
AMA Grand national Championship Series: Round 26, Sonoma CA, August 21, 1983, second place Grand Prix class
AMA Superbike Championship Series: Battle of the Twins, Elkhart Lake WI, June 10, 1984, finished 4th overall and third in the Grand Prix class
Finished third in the national point standings in 1984 in the Grand Prix class.

On March 1 and 2 in 1999, at the AHRMA Classic Days at Daytona International Speedway, Battley took first place in two races. First, in the eight-lap Formula One class, and then in the Battle of the Twins Open class. He was riding a 1998 Ducati 916.

== 1986–2025: Buell Motorcycles ==
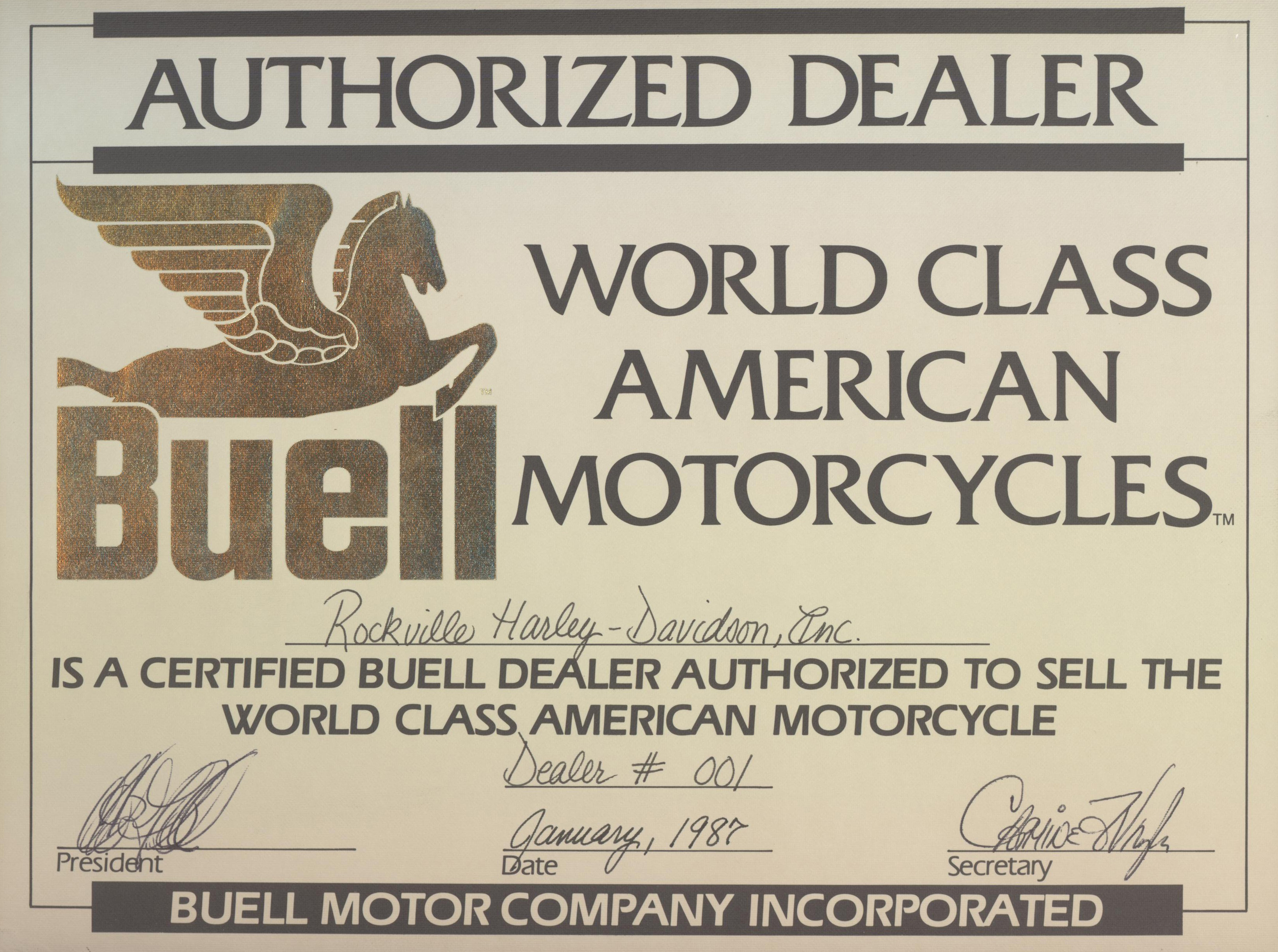
Buell dealership certificate issued to RHD

In 1986, Battley, through his friendship with Erik Buell, arranged for Rockville Harley-Davidson to become the world's first Buell dealership. Battley still had Buell #001, an RR1000 Battletwin, in his private collection.

In 1987, Battley smuggled Buell onto a cruise ship for the Harley-Davidson annual dealers' meeting. Battley told Harley-Davidson then-CEO, Vaughn Beals, that Buell could give the company a performance image with no risk to Harley. They set up a table for Buell to speak with dealers and by cruise-end he had deposits and orders for 25 motorcycles. Attendees such as Bill Bartels, Don Tilley, Devin Battley and Frank Ulicki (all ex-racers) went on to become some of Buell's most successful dealers.

== 1994–1996: Sales to King Hussein ==
In 1994 and 1996, Battley sold a collection of motorcycles to Hussein bin Talal, King Hussein I of Jordan. He traveled to Jordan to deliver and test the motorcycles. While there he rode across country with the King. A well publicized photo shows the King and Queen Noor riding a black, 1994 XLH1200 Harley-Davidson Sportster that Battley sold him.

External image
- Image of King Hussein and Queen Noor riding on Harley

In 1999, Battley was interviewed on ABC's Nightline with Ted Koppel about his experiences with King Hussein. In the broadcast, the Nightline commentator says, "[The King] enjoyed racing cars and motorcycles. There was a Harley dealer in Maryland, near a home the King kept there, that was his chief supplier." Battley is then interviewed, saying, "Anytime, he was liable to jump on one of these motorcycles, go blasting out of the palace grounds, you know, with his bodyguards in the big Mercedes chasing him and, you know, the King riding this motorcycle, he just got on the gas, kept going!"

=== List of motorcycles sold to King Hussein ===
Manufacturer	Year	Make and model	Color	Last of VIN
Harley-Davidson	1996	FXSTC Softail Custom	Violet	50657
Harley-Davidson	1996	FLSTN Softail Deluxe	Grey/Silver	50672
Harley-Davidson	1994	FLHTCU Electra Glide Ultra Classic with Sidecar	Aqua/Silver	506662
Harley-Davidson	1994	FLHTCU Electra Glide Ultra Classic with Sidecar	Black	506438
Harley-Davidson	1994	XLH1200 Sportster	Black	214733
Harley-Davidson	1994	FLSTC Heritage Softail Classic	Black	031282
Harley-Davidson	1994	FXDL Dyna Low	Aqua/Silver	312038
Yamaha	1995	XV250G	Red	036210
BMW	1996	R1100RTH	Red	441620

In 2004, Queen Noor published a book, A Leap of Faith: Memoirs of an Unexpected Life, which featured, on the paperback version, a picture of the king and queen riding on a 1994 Harley-Davidson FLSTC Heritage Softail that Battley sold the king.

== 2008: Chairman of the Maryland Governor's All-Terrain Vehicle (ATV) Safety Task Force ==
In 2008, the legislature of Maryland created a task force to define all-terrain vehicles (ATVs) and how they should be handled under Maryland law. Battley was appointed to the committee through his role as president of the Maryland Motorcycle Dealers Association and was elected chairman of the task force. The task force produced a report for the Maryland legislature in December 2008.

== 1999–2009: Big tree ==
From 1999 until 2009, Battley owned the Maryland State Champion Polar Lombardy (populus nigra) tree. The tree was over 72 feet in height and measured 132 points.

== Death ==
Battley died on December 3, 2025, at the age of 75.
