= 2009 Daytona AMA Superbike Championship round =

67th Daytona 200

== Schedule ==
Wednesday March 4
9:00am – 9:30am Practice SuperSport (SC)
9:45am – 10:45am Practice American Superbike (SC)
11:15am – 12:15pm Practice SunTrust Moto-GT (LC)
12:30pm – 1:30pm Practice Daytona SportBike (LC)
1:30pm – 2:30pm Mid-day Break
2:30pm – 3:30pm Practice SuperSport
3:45pm – 4:45pm Practice American Superbike with Safety Car
5:15pm – 6:15pm Practice SunTrust Moto-GT
6:30pm – 8:00pm Practice Daytona SportBike with Safety Car

Thursday March 5
8:00am – 9:00am Qualifying SunTrust Moto-GT
9:15am – 9:45am Basic Qualifying Daytona Sportbike
10:15am – 10:45am Basic Qualifying American Superbike
11:00am – 11:30am Qualifying SuperSport
11:45pm – 12:30pm SuperPole American Superbike
12:30pm – 1:30pm Mid-day Break
12:40pm Autograph Session – American Superbike, Daytona Sportbike and SunTrust Moto-GT in the Sprint FANZONE
1:30pm Opening Ceremonies - SuperSport
2:00pm 35-Mile Race SuperSport
3:00pm Opening Ceremonies - American Superbike
3:30pm 50-Mile Race American Superbike
6:30pm SuperPole Daytona SportBike

Friday March 6
2:00pm – 2:30pm Warm-Up SunTrust Moto-GT
2:45pm – 3:15pm Warm-Up Daytona SportBike
3:30pm Opening Ceremonies - SunTrust Moto-GT
4:00pm 2 Hour Race SunTrust Moto-GT
7:15pm Opening Ceremonies - Daytona SportBike
8:00pm Daytona 200 By Honda Cumguzzler

== AMA Pro American Superbike ==
=== Results ===
1. Mat Mladin (Suz GSX-R1000), 15 laps
2. Neil Hodgson (Hon CBR1000RR), -1.027 seconds
3. Tommy Hayden (Suz GSX-R1000), -1.028
4. Larry Pegram (Duc 1098R), -10.117
5. Blake Young (Suz GSX-R1000), -16.008
6. Ben Bostrom (Yam YZF-R1), -16.213
7. Aaron Yates (Suz GSX-R1000), -16.363
8. Josh Hayes (Yam YZF-R1), -28.358, ran off track
9. Michael Laverty (Suz GSX-R1000), -28.433
10. Geoff May (Suz GSX-R1000), -31.584
11. Jeff Wood (Suz GSX-R1000), -47.201
12. Aaron Gobert (Hon CBR1000RR), -57.270
13. Hawk Mazzotta (Suz GSX-R1000), -58.857
14. Chris Ulrich (Suz GSX-R1000), -58.950
15. Jeff Tigert (Hon CBR1000RR), -58.970
16. Scott Jensen (Suz GSX-R1000), -67.586
17. Barrett Long (Duc 1098R), -67.622
18. Scott Greenwood (Suz GSX-R1000), -67.942
19. Shane Narbonne (Suz GSX-R1000), -68.046
20. Mark Crozier (Yam YZF-R1), -71.556
21. Brett McCormick (Suz GSX-R1000), -77.907
22. Brad Hendry (Duc 1098R), -79.440
23. Dean Mizdal (Suz GSX-R1000), -93.973
24. Reno Karimian (Suz GSX-R1000), -93.944
25. Shawn Higbee (Buell 1125R), -1 lap
26. Johnny Rock Page (Yam YZF-R1), -1 lap, 17.135 seconds
27. Josh Graham (Yam YZF-R1), -1 lap, 27.725
28. David Loikits (Suz GSX-R1000), -1 lap, 41.847
29. Davie Stone (Hon CBR1000RR), -2 laps
30. David Anthony (Suz GSX-R1000), -7 laps, DNF
31. Taylor Knapp (Suz GSX-R1000), -11 laps, DNF, mechanical
32. Jake Holden (Hon CBR1000RR), -12 laps, DNF
33. Ryan Elleby (Suz GSX-R1000), -13 laps, DNF

== AMA Pro Daytona SportBike ==
=== Entry List (85 as of 2-10-09) ===
No	Rider	Team	Motorcycle	Tyre
1 (2)	(United States) Ben Bostrom	Team Graves Yamaha	Yamaha YZF-R6	D
1 (16)	(United States) Jake Zemke	Erion Racing	Honda CBR600RR	D
3	(United States) Kristian Turner	M4 Suzuki	Suzuki GSX-R600	D
4	(United States) Josh Hayes	Team Graves Yamaha	Yamaha YZF-R6	D
5	(United States) Russell Wikle	Roadracingworld.com	Suzuki GSX-R600	D
6	(United States) Tommy Aquino	Team Graves Yamaha	Yamaha YZF-R6	D
7	(Venezuela) Fernando Amantini	Amantini	Kawasaki Ninja ZX-6R	D
8	(United States) Josh Herrin	Team Graves Yamaha	Yamaha YZF-R6	D
9	(United States) Danny C. Eslick	Bruce Rossmeyers Daytona Racing/RMR Buell	Buell 1125R	D
10	(Canada) Chris Peris	Erion Racing	Honda CBR600RR	D
11	(United States) Shawn Higbee	Higbee-Racing.com	Buell 1125R	D
12	(United States) Shane Narbonne	Hooters Aprilia	Aprilia RSV	D
14	(United States) Mark Crozier	Crozier Motorsports	Triumph Daytona 675	D
15	(United States) Steve Rapp	Black Hole Racing	Aprilia RSV	D
17	(Canada) Miguel Duhamel	Suzuki/Blackfoot/Picotte Motorsports	Suzuki GSX-R600	D
19	(United States) Eric Haugo	Liberty Waves Racing	Yamaha YZF-R6	D
20	(United States) Calvin Martinez	Wisconsin Racing	Ducati 848	D
21	(United States) Ryan Elleby	Hooters Aprilia	Aprilia RSV	D
22	(United States) David Sadowski, Jr	Sadowski Brothers	Yamaha YZF-R6	D
25	(United States) David Anthony	Aussie Dave Racing	Suzuki GSX-R600	D
26	(United States) JP Tache	Four Feathers Racing	Yamaha YZF-R6	D
27	(United States) Scotty L. Van Hawk	Four Feathers Racing	Yamaha YZF-R6	D
28	(United States) Alistair Douglas	Giant Racing	Suzuki GSX-R600	D
29	(United States) Barrett Long	Paradigm Racing	Yamaha YZF-R6	D
30	(United States) Justin Filice	R & B Motorsports	Triumph Daytona 675	D
31	(United States) Garrett Carter	Garrett Carter Racing	Yamaha YZF-R6	D
32	(Colombia) Santiago Villa	Roadracingworld.com	Suzuki GSX-R600	D
33	(Canada) Matt McBride	Vallely Racing	Suzuki GSX-R600	D
34	(United States) Michael Barns	RMR Geico Powersports Buell Racing	Buell 1125R	D
36	(Colombia) Martin Cardenas	M4 Suzuki	Suzuki GSX-R600	D
37	(United States) John Ashmead	Brady Racing	Kawasaki Ninja ZX-6R	D
38	(United States) Dean Mizdal	M Racing	Kawasaki Ninja ZX-6R	D
40	(United States) Jason DiSalvo	M4 Suzuki	Suzuki GSX-R600	D
45	(United States) Josh Bryan	Latus Motors Racing	Buell 1125R	D
46	(United States) Tyler Odom	Don Odom Racing	Honda CBR600RR	D
47	(United States) RIDER	Four Feathers Racing	Yamaha YZF-R6	D
51	(United States) Damian Cudlin	Team E.S.P. Yamaha	Yamaha YZF-R6	D
53	(United States) Eric Wood	Team Woodcraft/Heyser Racing	Honda CBR600RR	D
54	(Canada) Alan Schmidt	Latus Motors Racing	Buell 1125R	D
55	(United States) Christopher Fillmore	CF Racing	Yamaha YZF-R6	D
57	(Wales) Chaz Davies	Factory Aprilia Millennium Technologies Team	Aprilia RSV	D
60	(United States) Michael Beck	Team Beck Racing	Yamaha YZF-R6	D
63	(United States) Lloyd Bayley	Chronic Motorsports	Yamaha YZF-R6	D
64	(United States) Armando Ferrer	TeamHurtByAccident.com	Suzuki GSX-R600	D
67	(United States) Ty Howard	Ridesmart Motorcycle Schools	Aprilia RSV	D
68	(Canada) Kevin Boisvert	Bayside Performance	Suzuki GSX-R600	D
69	(United States) Kyle Keesee	BSB Racing/Keesee Racing	Kawasaki Ninja ZX-6R	D
70	(United States) Daniel Parkerson	JP Motorsports	Kawasaki Ninja ZX-6R	D
73	(United States) Dylon Husband	Team Pur Sang Racing	Kawasaki Ninja ZX-6R	D
76	(United States) Scott Jensen	Black Hole Racing	Aprilia RSV	D
84	(United States) Anthony Fania	KSW Insurance Racing	Suzuki GSX-R600	D
87	(United States) Taylor Knapp	Taylor Knapp Racing	Kawasaki Ninja ZX-6R	D
88	(United Kingdom) Jamie Hacking	Monster Energy Attack Kawasaki	Kawasaki ZX-6R	D
94	(United States) Gene Burcham	GBR Motors	Ducati 848	D
95	(United States) Roger Lee Hayden	Monster Energy Attack Kawasaki	Kawasaki ZX-6R	D
97	(United States) Ben Thompson	Factory Aprilia Millennium Technologies Team	Aprilia RSV	D
98	(United States) Bryan Bemisderfer	HDFR	Buell 1125R	D
101	(Guatemala) Marcos Reichert	Rockwall Performance	Yamaha YZF-R6	D
111	(United States) Mike deBrabant	deBrabant Motorsports	Suzuki GSX-R600	D
112	(United States) Ricky Orlando	Ricky Orlando Racing	Kawasaki Ninja ZX-6R	D
113	(United States) Craig Moodie	Bulldog Racing	Yamaha YZF-R6	D
125	(United States) Ryan Patterson	D & R Racing	Yamaha YZF-R6	D
131	(United States) Todd Keesee	BSB Racing/Keesee Racing	Yamaha YZF-R6	D
171	(United States) Ray Hofman	WisconsinSportbikes.net	Honda CBR600RR	D
177	(United States) Paul Schwemmer	Old Pros Racing	Kawasaki ZX-6R	D
191	(United States) Jeffrey Tigert	TigerTeam Racing	Honda CBR600RR	D
199	(United States) Larry Myers	AAA Lift Truck	Kawasaki Ninja ZX-6R	D
204	(United States) Andres Londono	Destiny Racing	Yamaha YZF-R6	D
213	(United States) Dane Westby	Westby Racing/Kneedraggers.com	Yamaha YZF-R6	D
221	(United States) Walt Sipp	Walt Sipp Racing	Yamaha YZF-R6	D
269	(United States) Johnny Rock Page	944 Magazine/ Energized by Verve!	Yamaha YZF-R6	D
310	(United States) Rodney Vest	R & R Racing	Suzuki GSX-R600	D
311	(Venezuela) Robertino Pietri	Team E.S.P. Yamaha	Yamaha YZF-R6	D
321	(United States) Jason Quillman	Quillman Motorsports	Yamaha YZF-R6	D
322	(United States) James Digiandomenico	J & T Racing	Yamaha YZF-R6	D
370	(United States) Clinton Gibson	Team Pur Sang Racing	Kawasaki Ninja ZX-6R	D
398	(United States) Thomas Digiandomenico	J & T Racing	Yamaha YZF-R6	D
413	(United States) Melissa Paris	MarkBilt	Yamaha YZF-R6	D
474	(Slovenia) Boštjan Pintar	Inotherm Racing Team	Yamaha YZF-R6	D
484	(Slovenia) Boštjan Skubic	Inotherm Racing Team	Yamaha YZF-R6	D
505	(United States) Nicky Moore	Nicky Moore	Kawasaki Ninja ZX-6R	D
528	(United States) Mark McCormick	McNology Racing 1	Yamaha YZF-R6	D
594	(United States) David McPherson	McNology Racing 1	Yamaha YZF-R6	D
715	(United States) Troy Vincent	TVH Racing	Yamaha YZF-R6	D
746	(United States) Meghan Stiles	Team Stiles	Yamaha YZF-R6	D
