= Buell Blast =

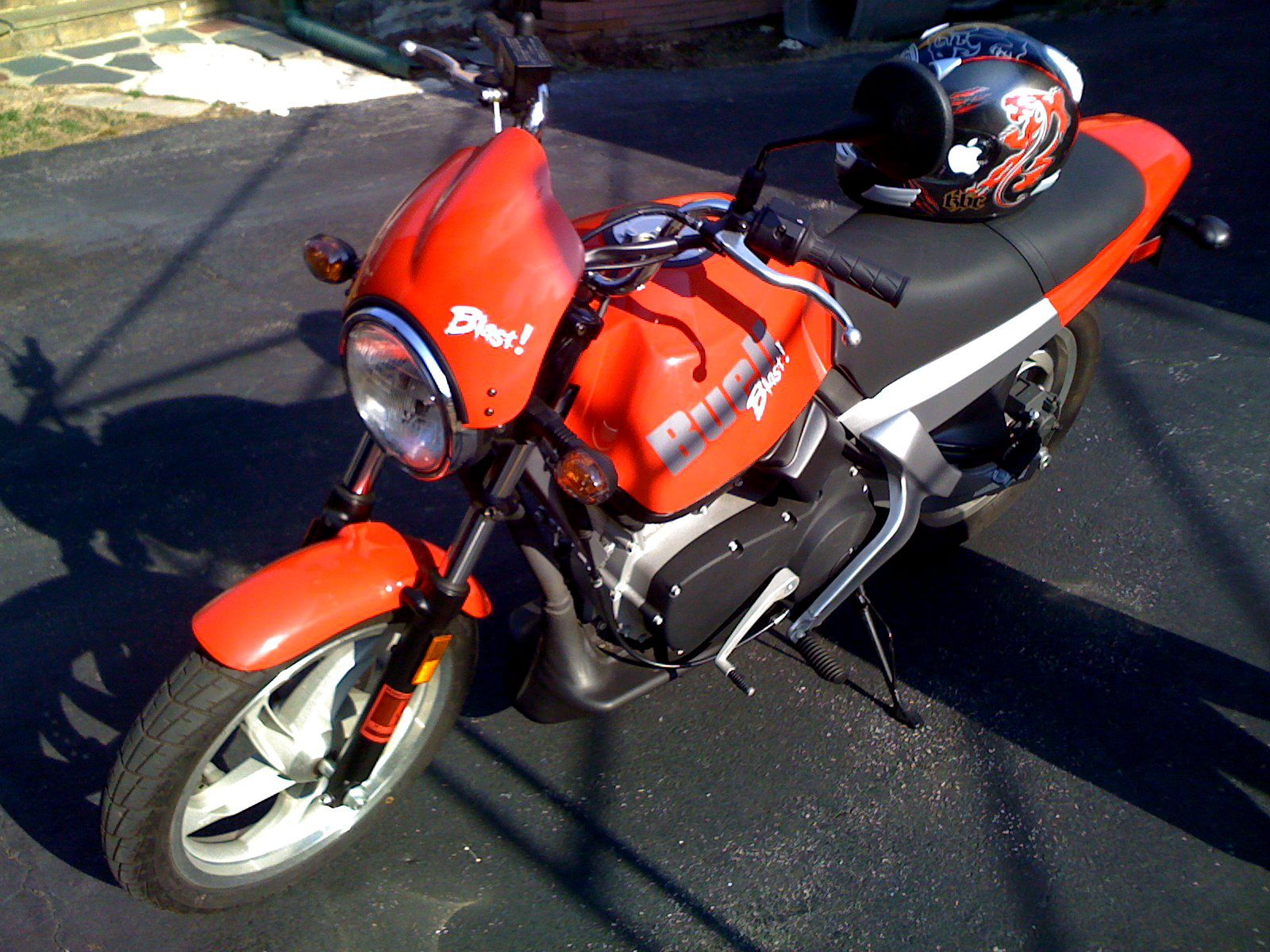
- Manufacturer: Buell Motorcycle Company
- Parent company: Harley-Davidson Inc.
- Production: 2000–2009
- Class: standard
- Engine: 491.64 cc air cooled OHV single
- Bore / stroke: 88.9 mm × 79.4 mm (3.50 in × 3.13 in)
- Power: 34 bhp (25 kW) @ 6,500 rpm
- Torque: 30 ft⋅lbf (41 N⋅m) @ 6,500 rpm
- Transmission: 5-speed manual
- Suspension: Front: telescopic fork Rear: swingarm with single coil-over-shock unit.
- Brakes: Disc/disc
- Tires: Front: 100/80-16M/CTL 50T; Rear: 120/80-16M/CTL 60T
- Rake, trail: 25.0° / 3.4 in (86 mm)
- Wheelbase: 55.0 in (1,400 mm)
- Dimensions: L: 77.8 in (1,980 mm); W: 29.3 in (740 mm)
- Seat height: Standard: 27.5 in (700 mm); Low profile: 25.5 in (650 mm)
- Weight: 360 lb (163 kg) (dry); 399 lb (181 kg) (wet)
- Fuel capacity: 2.80 US gal (10.6 L; 2.33 imp gal)
- Oil capacity: 2.0 US qt (1,900 ml)
- Fuel consumption: 64 miles per US gallon (3.7 L/100 km; 77 mpg_{‑imp})

The Buell Blast is a motorcycle that was made by the Buell Motorcycle Company from 2000 to 2009.

The Blast was conceived as an entry-level motorcycle to attract newcomers to motorcycling in general and to Harley-Davidson in particular. As such, the design goals were low cost and ease of operation and maintenance. Steps to achieve these goals include the use of an automatically tensioned belt final drive, self-adjusting hydraulic valve lifters, and a carburetor with an automatic choke. The engine design was borrowed from Harley's Evolution Sportster engine with the rear cylinder eliminated. The plastic bodywork pieces of the Blast were made from Surlyn, a substance used to make the outside of golf balls, to protect the surfaces when the Blast is dropped, and the color is molded-in.

The Blast was used in Harley-Davidson's Rider's Edge New Rider program, a similar course to the Motorcycle Safety Foundation's Basic "RiderCourse".

In July 2009, prior to ceasing all motorcycle production, Buell ran an ad campaign stating that the Buell Blast would no longer appear in their line-up. The ad featured a Buell Blast being destroyed in an automobile crusher. For 2010, a limited run of crushed Blast cubes was offered for sale upon request. They were available in Battle Blue, Midnight Black, and Sunfire Yellow, and were individually signed and numbered by Erik Buell.
