= Buell Motorcycle Company =

American motorcycle manufacturer

Buell Motorcycles
- Type: Privately held company
- Industry: Motorcycles
- Founded: 1983
- Founder: Erik Buell
- Headquarters: Grand Rapids, Michigan, U.S.
- Key people: Bill Melvin (owner and CEO)
- Products: Motorcycles
- Website: buellmotorcycle.com

Buell Motorcycles is an American motorcycle manufacturer based in Grand Rapids, Michigan. It was founded in 1983 by ex-Harley-Davidson engineer Erik Buell. Harley-Davidson acquired 49 percent of Buell in 1993, and Buell became a wholly owned subsidiary of Harley-Davidson by 2003. On November 17, 2006, Buell announced that it had produced and shipped its 100,000th motorcycle.

On October 15, 2009, Harley-Davidson announced the discontinuation of the Buell product line as part of its strategy to focus on the Harley-Davidson brand. The last Buell motorcycle produced through Harley-Davidson was on October 30, 2009, bringing the number manufactured to 136,923. In November 2009, Erik Buell announced the launch of Erik Buell Racing, an independent company run by Erik Buell which initially produced race-only versions of the 1125R model, then subsequently offered an updated 1190RS model for the street or the track, and produced further improved 1190RX and 1190SX models which are intended for street or track use.

In February 2021, Buell Motorcycles announced that motorcycle production had returned, under the ownership of Erik Buell Racing (EBR). Buell announced they will use the superbike platforms developed from 2011 to 2020 to build out their model line up to approximately ten models in 2024. The models will include variations for touring, dirt, adventure, and cruisers.

== History ==
The first Buell motorcycle, the RW750, was built in 1983 purely for competition in the AMA Formula 1 motorcycle road racing championship. At the time, Erik Buell was a top contending privateer motorcycle racer. After completion of the first two RW750 racing machines, one of which was sold to another racing team, the Formula 1 series was canceled. Erik Buell turned his focus towards racing-inspired, street-going machines using engines manufactured by Harley. In 1987 Rockville Harley-Davidson in Rockville, Maryland (now District Harley-Davidson / District Cycles, formerly Battley Harley-Davidson / Battley Cycles in Gaithersburg, Maryland) became the world's first Buell dealership and the owner, Devin Battley has Buell #1, an RR1000 in his personal collection.

In 1993, Harley-Davidson purchased 49% of Buell, investing $500,000 and taking Erik Buell's house as security. Erik Buell took the deal, against strong advice from his attorney. Harley-Davidson CEO Jeffrey Bleustein had bought it as a skunkworks development. In 1994, Buell created the Buell Riders Adventure Group (BRAG) which hosted events around the country. Buell discontinued BRAG in 2006, stating the changes would improve "the privileges and ownership experience for all Buell owners more than ever before." In 1998, Harley-Davidson bought a majority stake and took control of Buell Motorcycle Company, and the company became a subsidiary. Since then, Buell has used modified Harley-Davidson engines, primarily from the Sportster, to power its motorcycles.

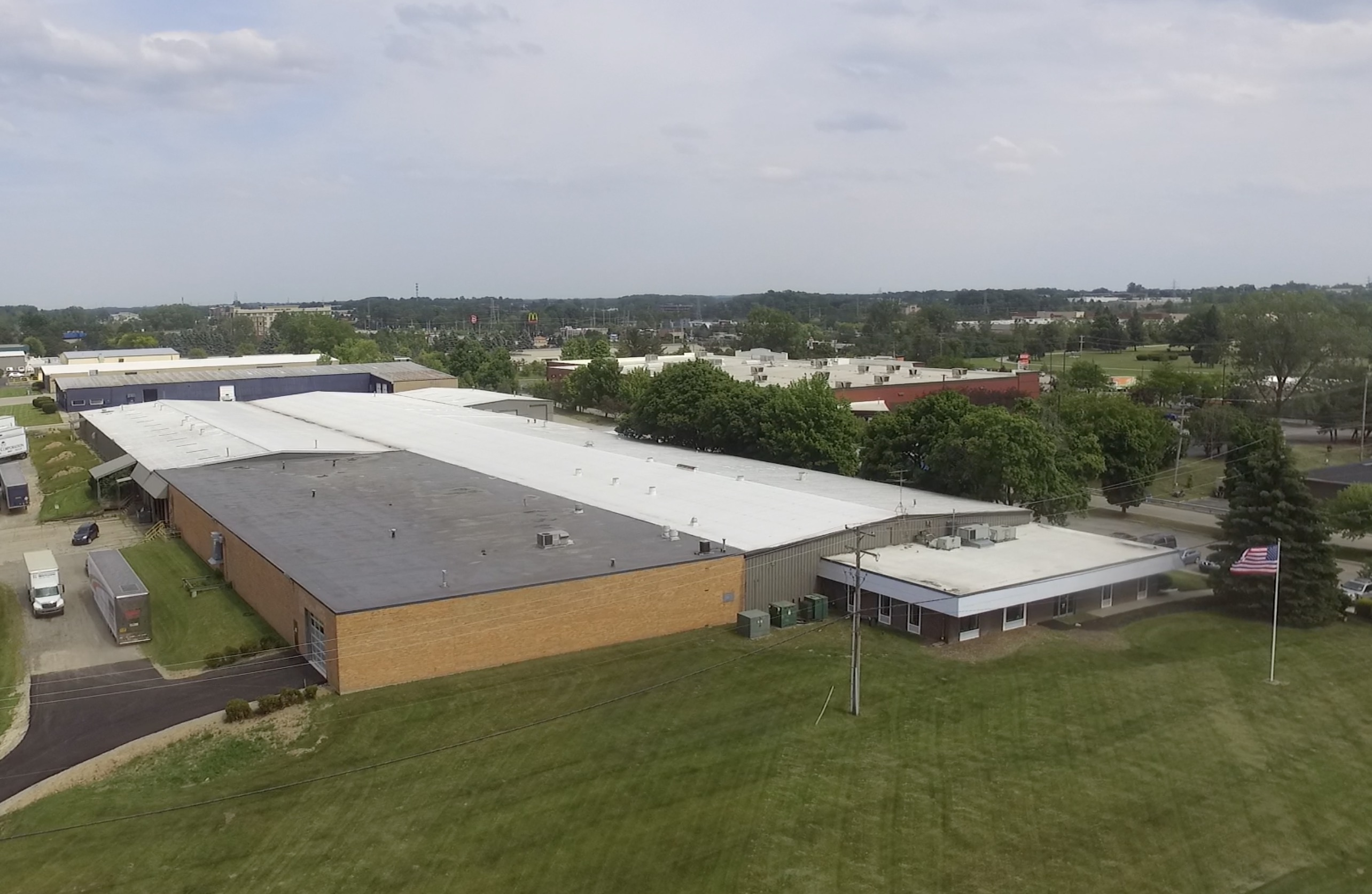
The Buell motorcycle factory in Grand Rapids, Michigan

Most Buell motorcycles use four-stroke air-cooled V-twin engines, originally built for the XR1000 Sportster. After these were depleted, a basic 1200 Sportster engine was used. In 1995, the engines were upgraded with Buell engineered high-performance parts and further upgraded in 1998.

The liquid-cooled Harley V-Rod motor, developed by Harley-Davidson then made street legal according to the EPA by Porsche, was originally an Erik Buell project, designed for a fully faired AMA Superbike Buell by 1998. Harley decided the engine should also be used in a sport-cruiser, then took over development, making it "too big, too heavy, too expensive and too late" for Buell. Harley-Davidson forced Buell to follow a rigid product planning and distribution process beginning in the 1990s, with the philosophy that Buell was the starter brand, and customers would eventually trade up to a Harley. By 2008, Harley's credit arm, Harley-Davidson Financial Services (HDFS), was struggling, and the lower resale value of Buell motorcycles meant that new bike sales were significantly affected. When Harley CEO Keith Wandell was hired, he immediately questioned why Harley even owned Buell. Wandell, who had never been on a Harley before being hired, was heard talking about "Erik's racing hobby", and questioned "why anyone would even want to ride a sportbike". He organized a team to analyze "the adrenaline market", and concluded that sportbikes would encounter high competition and low profits, while cruisers had high returns.

On Thursday, October 15, 2009, Harley-Davidson Inc. announced the end of production of Buell Motorcycles in order to focus more on the Harley-Davidson brand. Selling Buell was not legitimately considered, as Harley didn't want their Harley dealerships to sell an outside brand, and Harley didn't feel Buell had much value without the dealer network. In a news release on the Buell website the same day, company officials thanked customers, employees, and dealers for "an unforgettable ride". Closing the Buell brand was estimated to cost Harley approximately the same as their total investment in Buell over the past 25 years. Erik Buell immediately began looking for outside buyers, finding BRP (who owns the Austrian Rotax engine manufacturer BRP-Powertrain) a good choice, especially since Harley would have to pay Rotax "an eight-figure sum" for the 1,125 cc engine contract. Erik Buell later started Erik Buell Racing (EBR) to provide support for 1125 and XB privateer race efforts.

In April 2015, EBR filed for receivership, despite a deal in 2013 where Indian firm Hero MotoCorp acquired 49 percent of the company, and in January 2016, the remaining assets of Erik Buell Racing were sold to the firm Liquid Asset Partners. Under Liquid Asset Partners's ownership, the company took the name "EBR Motorcycles" in 2019, and subsequently acquired the rights in the United States to the Buell nameplate. In February 2021, newly renamed Buell Motorcycles announced its return to the motorcycle market, with the intention to release ten new models between then and 2024.

== Technology ==
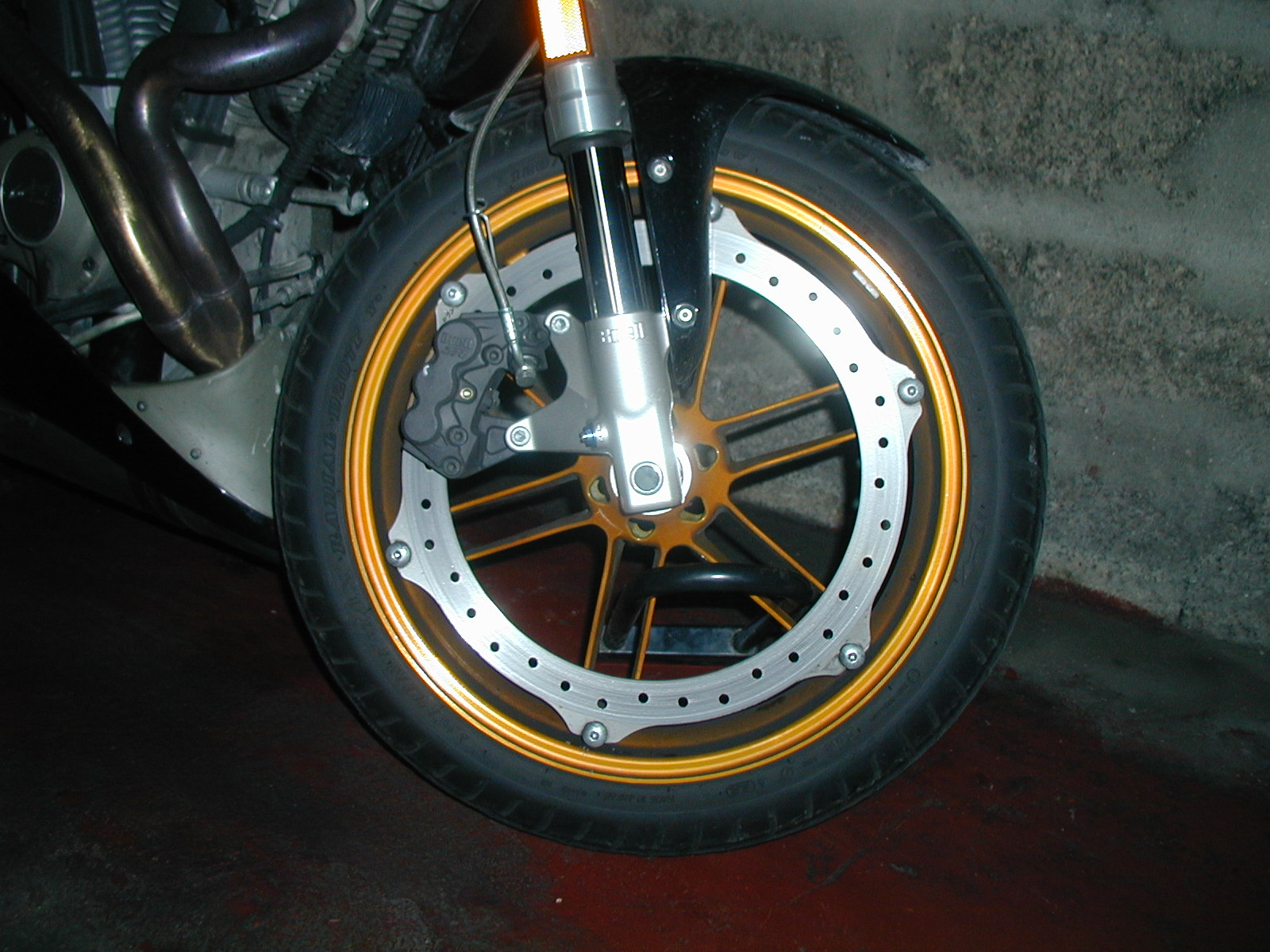
Buell ZTL front brake

Buell XB models also incorporated the industry's first Zero Torsional Load (ZTL) perimeter floating front disc brake system, a patented "inside-out" wheel/brake design that puts the brake disc on the outer edge of the wheel, rather than at the hub. This lets the suspension function better, improving control and traction, through reducing unsprung weight on the front wheel, because only a single disc and caliper—with a corresponding reduction in bolts and brake fluid—is needed compared with the conventional dual-disc brake setup on most modern sport bikes. In an exchange in the pages of Motorcyclist magazine between Suzuki engineer James Parker, creator of the GSX-RADD hub-center steering system, and Buell's Director of Analysis, Test & Engineering Process, Abraham Askenazi, Parker conceded the ZTL system's advantage in unsprung weight. But he pointed out the remaining weight is located further out on the rim where it is most detrimental to acceleration and braking, and that there were potential heat transfer issues, and the need for one fork leg to be stronger than the other. Responding, Askenazi disputed all of Parker's criticisms, saying the ZTL system was 30% lighter than the brakes on the Suzuki GSX-R1000, and that the inertia of having the weight further out on the rim, and the heat generation near the tire, were not negative factors, based on testing. Askenazi concluded that testing and race track experience had proven the ZTL to be "state of the art."

Other industry innovations introduced by Buell in the XB lineup were the "fuel in frame" technology, and the dual use of the swingarm as an oil tank. Also, all Buell models have a muffler mounted below the engine which helps keep mass centralized with some models featuring a computer-controlled valve to switch between two exhaust paths as necessary to maximize torque. Buell designs focus on providing good handling, comfortable riding, easy maintenance, and street-friendly real-world performance. Buell motorcycles were engineered with an emphasis on what they called the "Trilogy of Tech": mass centralization, low unsprung weight, and frame rigidity.

Buell engines were designed to be street-friendly both in fuel efficiency (up to 70 mpg_{‑US} or 3.4 L/100 km or 84 mpg_{‑imp} with the Blast), and in torque (the 1,203 cc version produces 110 N⋅m or 81 lbf⋅ft). They are also simple and easy to maintain. Most Buell two-cylinder engines utilize computer controlled ducted forced air cooling (variable speed fan that only activates as required), two valves per cylinder, a single throttle body, zero maintenance hydraulic valve actuation, and zero maintenance gear-driven cams. Buell advanced its 1190 platform significantly under the Erik Buell Racing tenure. Engine technology improved to the EV-V2 1190cc 72 degree V-Twin that produces 185 horsepower at 10,600 rpm and 102 ft. lbs. of torque at 8200 rpm.

== Buell models ==
=== Tube-frame bikes (1984–2002) ===
==== RW 750 Road Warrior (1984) ====
The RW 750 was a development of the Barton Formula One racing motorcycle. Buell bought the parts and tooling from the failed Barton concern and developed the RW 750 for his own use and for sale to private entrants. The engine was a liquid-cooled two-stroke square four. Buell's development resulted in a more competitive racer, but production ceased when the AMA discontinued the Formula One class.

==== RR 1000 Battletwin (1987–1988) ====
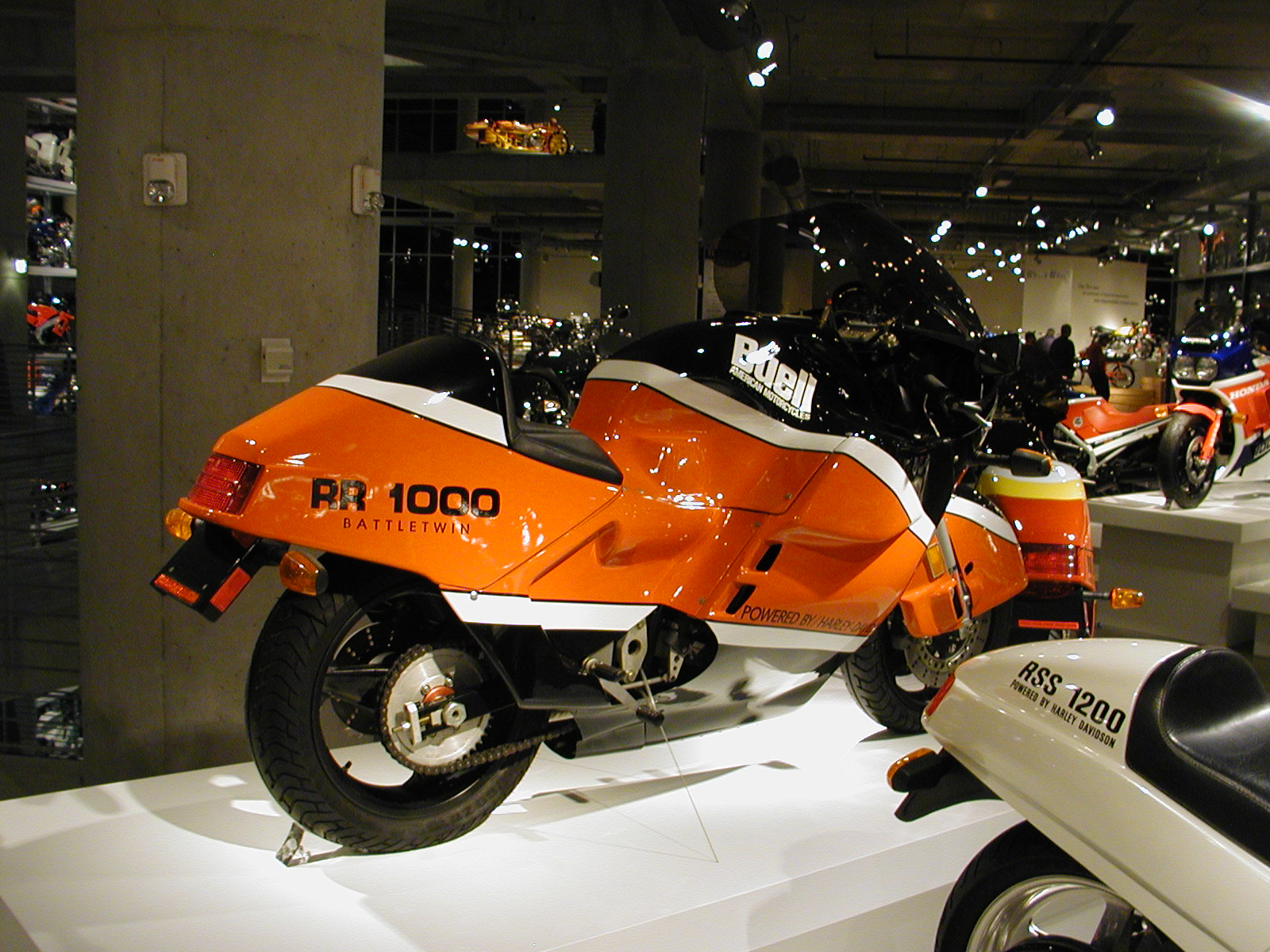
RR1000 Battletwin

The RR 1000 Battletwin was a street sportbike using a modified Road Warrior chassis and a Harley-Davidson XR1000 engine. Buell invented the Isoplanar engine mounting system to allow the heavy, vibration-prone engine to be used as a structural member of the frame without transmitting the engine vibrations to the frame. Lack of space caused Buell to put the suspension components under the engine. The linkage caused the spring and the shock absorber to extend when the wheel went up.

Variations on the RR 1000 Battletwin include the RR 1200 Battletwin (1988–1990), the RS 1200 Westwind (1989), the RS 1200/5 Westwind (1990–1992) and the RSS 1200 Westwind (1991).

==== S2 Thunderbolt (1994–1995) ====
Two-seater with Road Warrior-based chassis and Sportster engine. The S2T Thunderbolt (1995–1996) was a touring version, with saddlebags. The S2 was very expensive to develop (around $100,000), and 1,399 units were sold in the first year—well over the 300 units Buell had projected.

==== S1 Lightning (1996–1998) ====
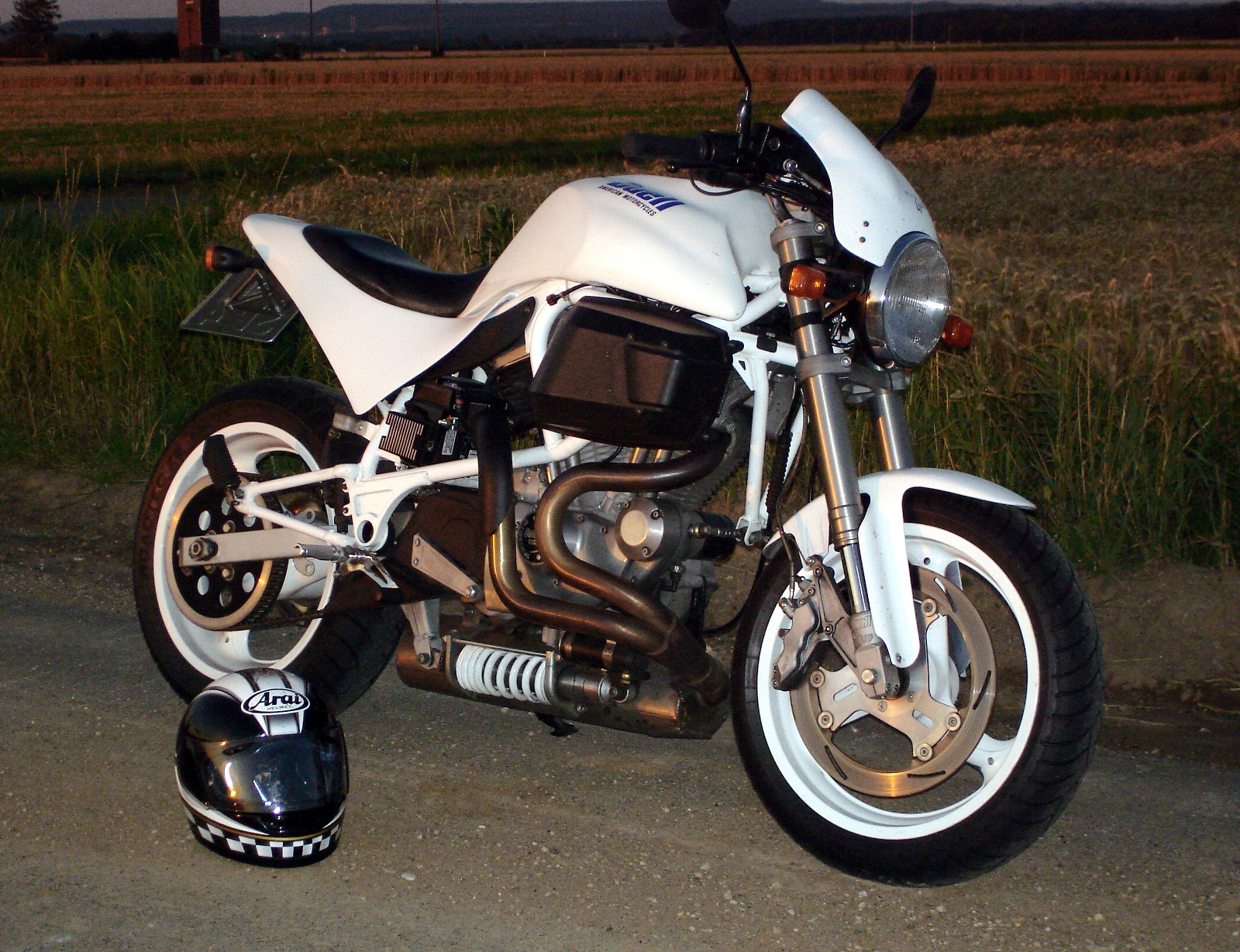
Buell S1 White Lightning

The S1 Lightning was a more fundamental sportbike than the S3 Thunderbolt and M2 Cyclone that it was marketed alongside and the production on this model was stopped at 5000 after only 3 years. Variants of this version of the Lightning were the S1 Lightning (1996/1997/1998) and the S1W White Lightning (1998). The S1W came with a larger tank and Thunderstorm cylinder heads which gave an extra 10 hp (7.5 kW).

==== X1 Lightning (1999–2002) ====
The X1 Lightning was the successor to the S1 Lightning line. It used the Thunderstorm heads, fuel injection (Dynamic Digital Fuel Injection), and incorporated larger fuel tanks as well as completely different body designs. The most recognizable frame piece was the brushed aluminum tail section that swept upward and back underneath the two-up seat.

==== S3 and S3T Thunderbolt (1997–2002) ====
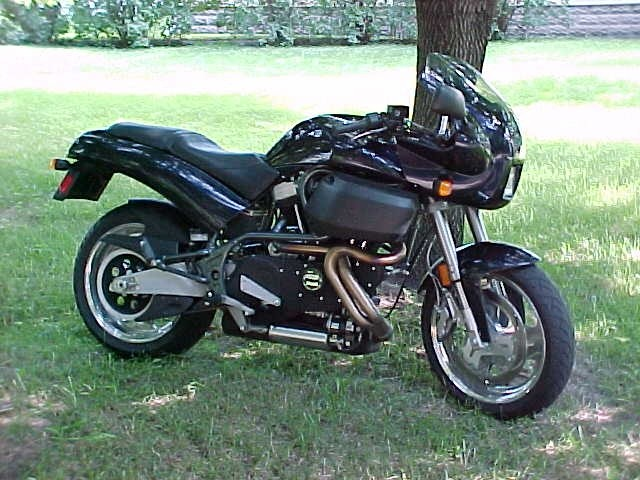
1999 Buell S3 Thunderbolt

The S3 Thunderbolt sport-touring model was produced from 1997 until 2003, along with a mechanically identical S3T "Touring" model that ran through model year 2000. The 1,203 cc air-cooled V-Twin engine was mounted as a stressed member in a tubular frame. The powerplant output 91 hp (68 kW) in 1997 and jumped to 101 hp (75 kW) in the following years due to revised cam profiles and the new Thunderstorm cylinder heads. While the bike's overall look was the same throughout the model run, there were significant changes made in 1999 that set it, and later models, apart from the 1997 and 1998 bikes. The early bikes used a rectangular section steel rear swingarm, WP Suspension front forks and rear shock, a Keihin 40 mm CV carburetor, and a Performance Machine six-piston front brake caliper. Beginning in 1999 a new cast aluminum rear swingarm was utilized along with Showa front suspension forks and rear shock. The front brake caliper, while still a six-piston unit, was now made by Nissin. The most technological change was with the new Dynamic Digital Fuel Injection (DDFI) system, which replaced the old carburetor.

The S3 had a half fairing that surrounded the headlight and gave decent wind protection for the rider's torso. The S3T model then added lower fairing extensions that gave better wind protection to the rider's legs. The S3T also had hard saddlebags that could be color-matched to the bike color and were available in either "wide" for maximum storage, or "narrow" for a lighter feel. In addition to the lower fairings and the saddlebags, the S3T also came with a taller handlebar for a more upright, relaxed riding position. Each of the parts that set the S3T apart were available as accessories for the standard S3 model.

==== M2 Cyclone (1997–2002) ====
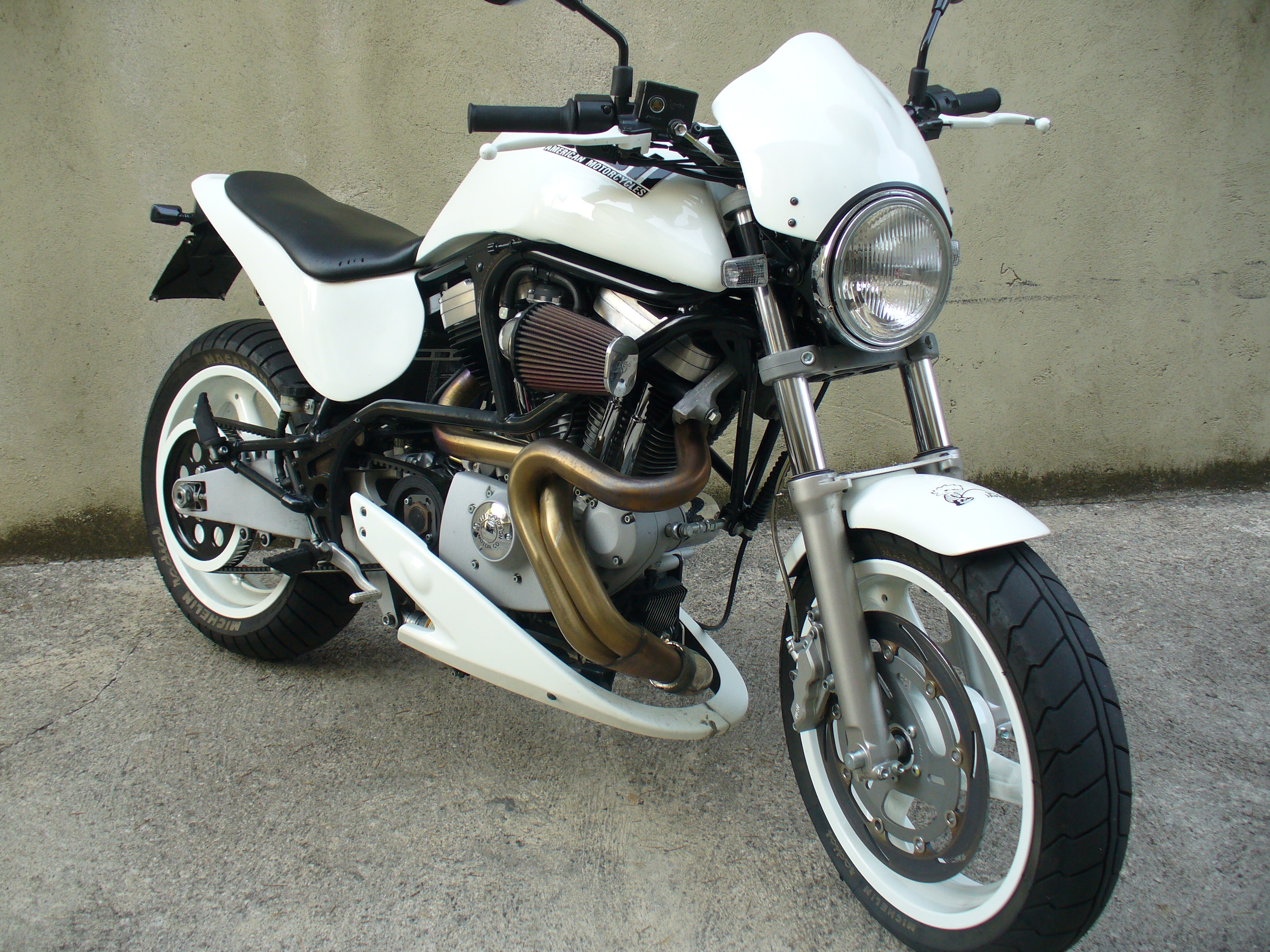
2000 Buell M2 Cyclone

The M2 Cyclone was produced from 1997 to 2003. It was in the middle of the Buell line up between the puristic S1 Lightning and the more comfortable but heavier S3 Thunderbolt. The S1 Lightning was faster and lighter than the others but had a very narrow seat. The S3 Thunderbolt was a touring bike that had a wider seat and more comfortable riding position, but was also heavier. The M2 Cyclone filled the gap between the sport and touring models with a bigger seat than the S1 Lightning and lighter and faster than the S3 Thunderbolt. The M2 was only available with the 1,203 cc engine and five-speed transmission. The frame was tubular CrMo steel.

=== Blast (2000–2009) ===
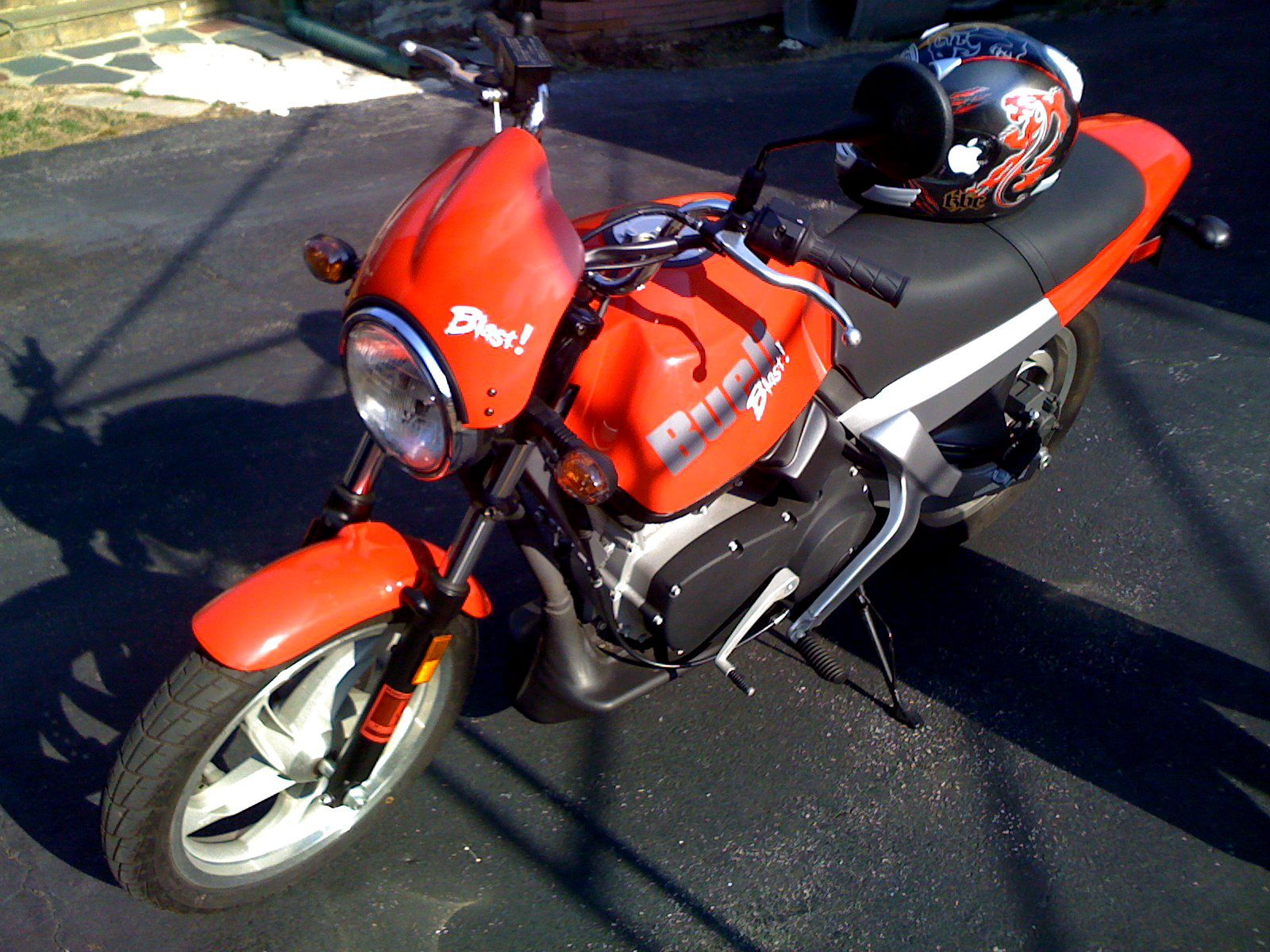
2000 Buell Blast

The Blast was Buell's only model to use a single-cylinder engine. With 492 cc (30.0 cu in) displacement and 360 lb (160 kg) dry weight, it was their smallest model, often used in Harley-Davidson's "Rider's Edge" new rider instruction/riding schools. That fulfilled Harley CEO Jeff Bleustein's idea to make a specific training bike, since many students buy a bike from the dealer where they trained.

The Blast came from a quick proof-of-concept at the Buell factory. It originally used half of a Sportster 883 engine. The engine ended up 80 percent over budget and very expensive compared to the higher-technology Rotax engines available from outside the company. Cycle World wrote "Such an overrun would be unheard of from an outside supplier, but when your supplier also owns you, you grin and bear it." The Blast was ultimately the most expensive development project Buell undertook. Because the engine was overpriced, it ended up making money for Harley while losing money for Buell. It was regarded as a technical success. In July 2009, Buell ran an ad campaign saying that the Blast would no longer appear in their line-up. The ad showed a Buell Blast being destroyed in an automobile crusher.

=== XB-series (2003–2010) ===
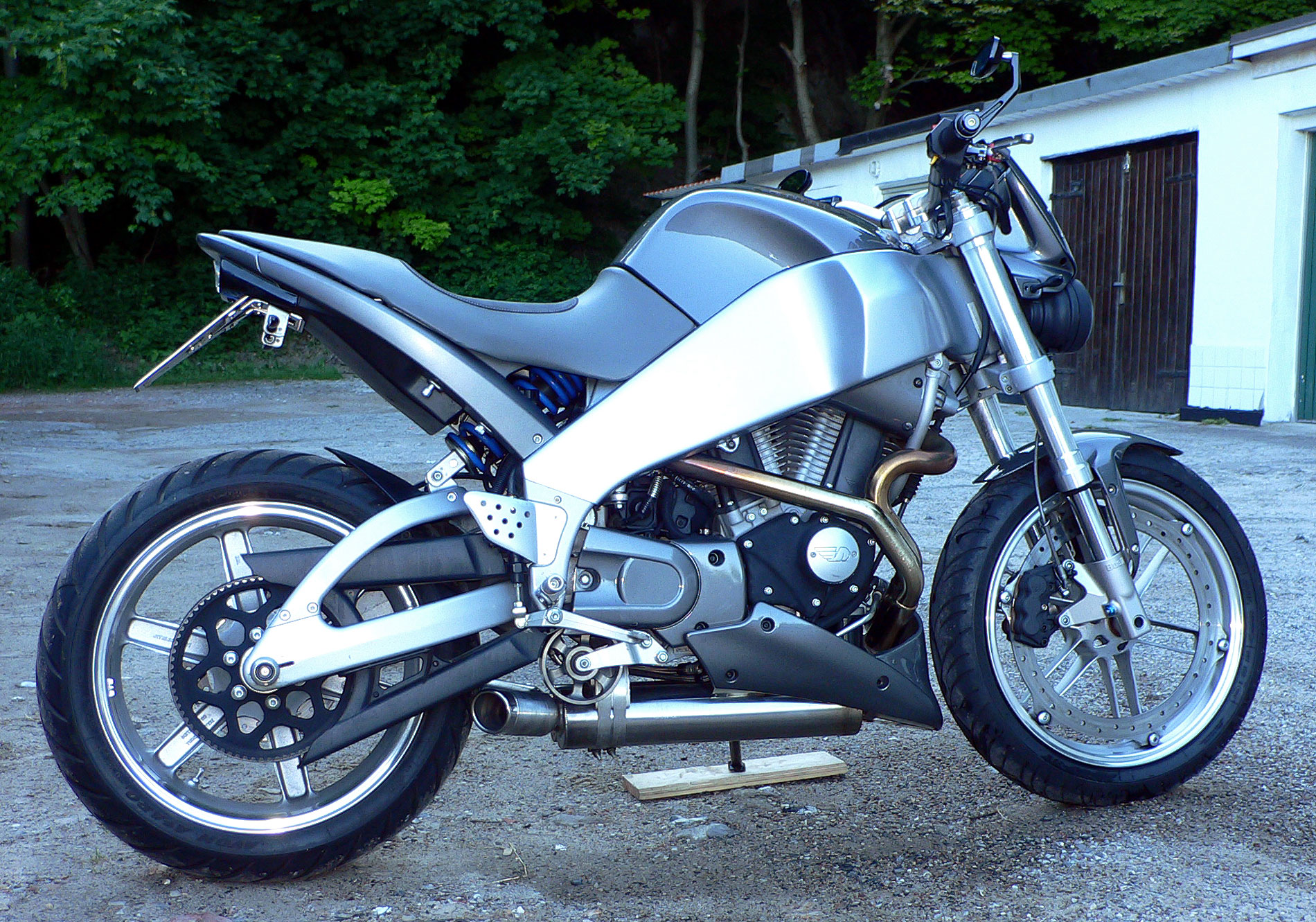
2003 Buell Lightning XB9S

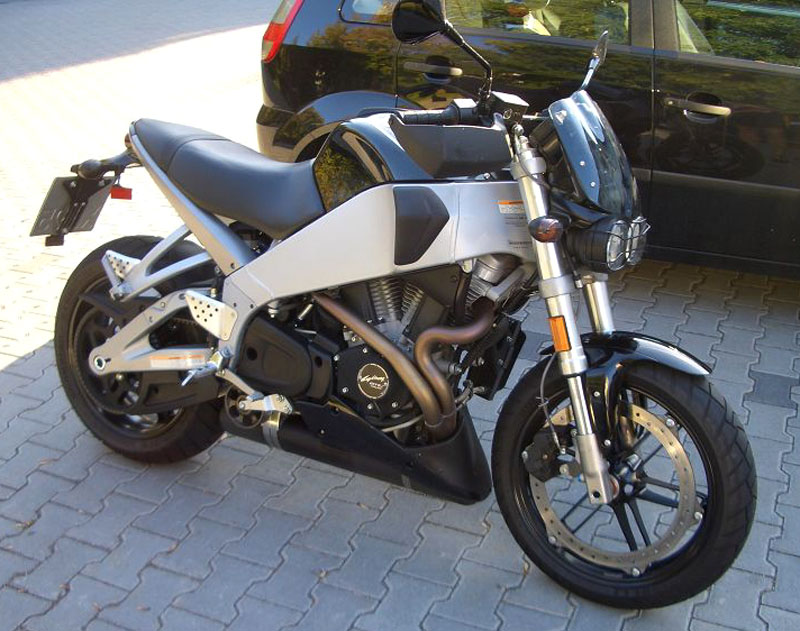
2006 Buell Lightning CityX XB9SX

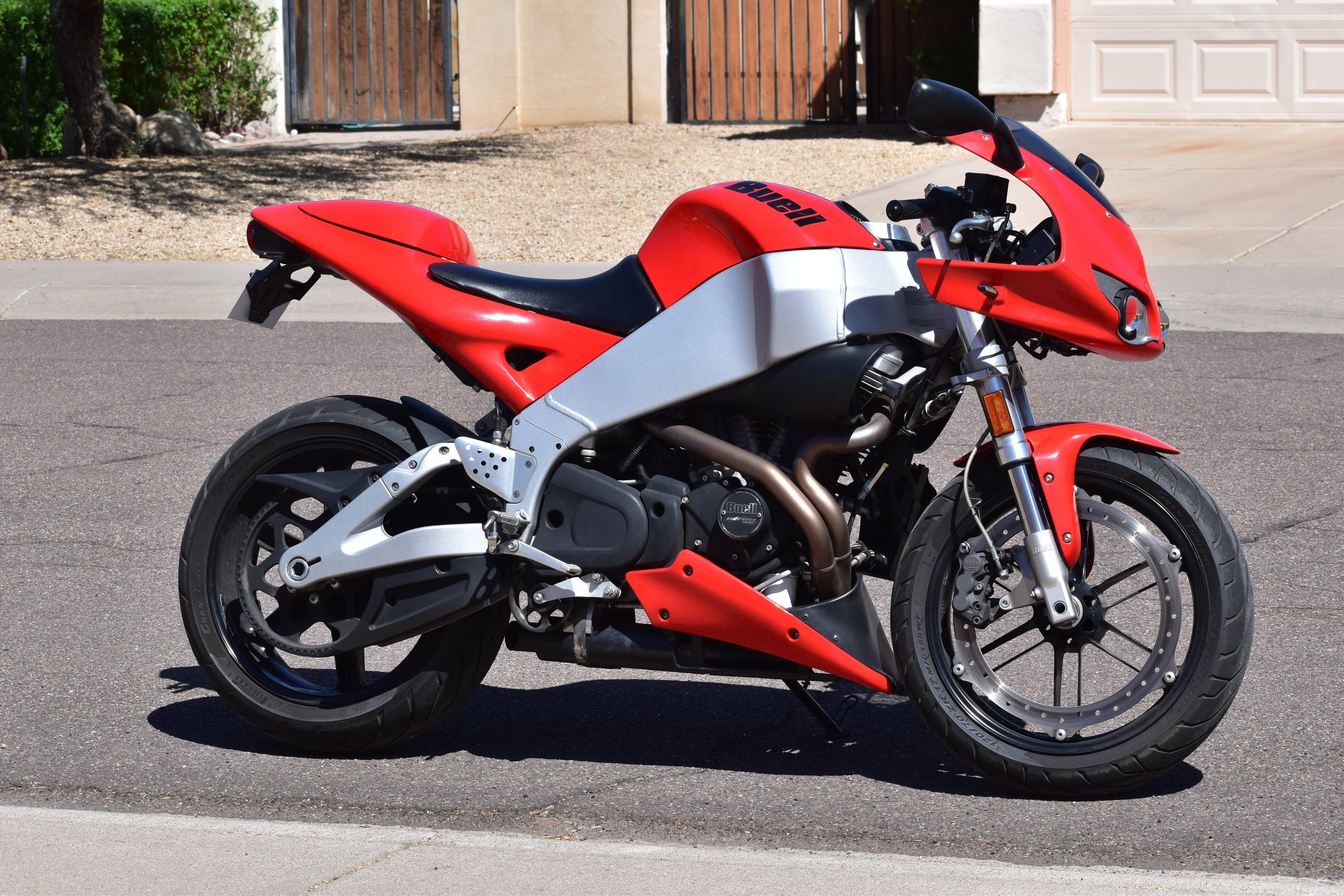
2007 Buell Firebolt XB9R

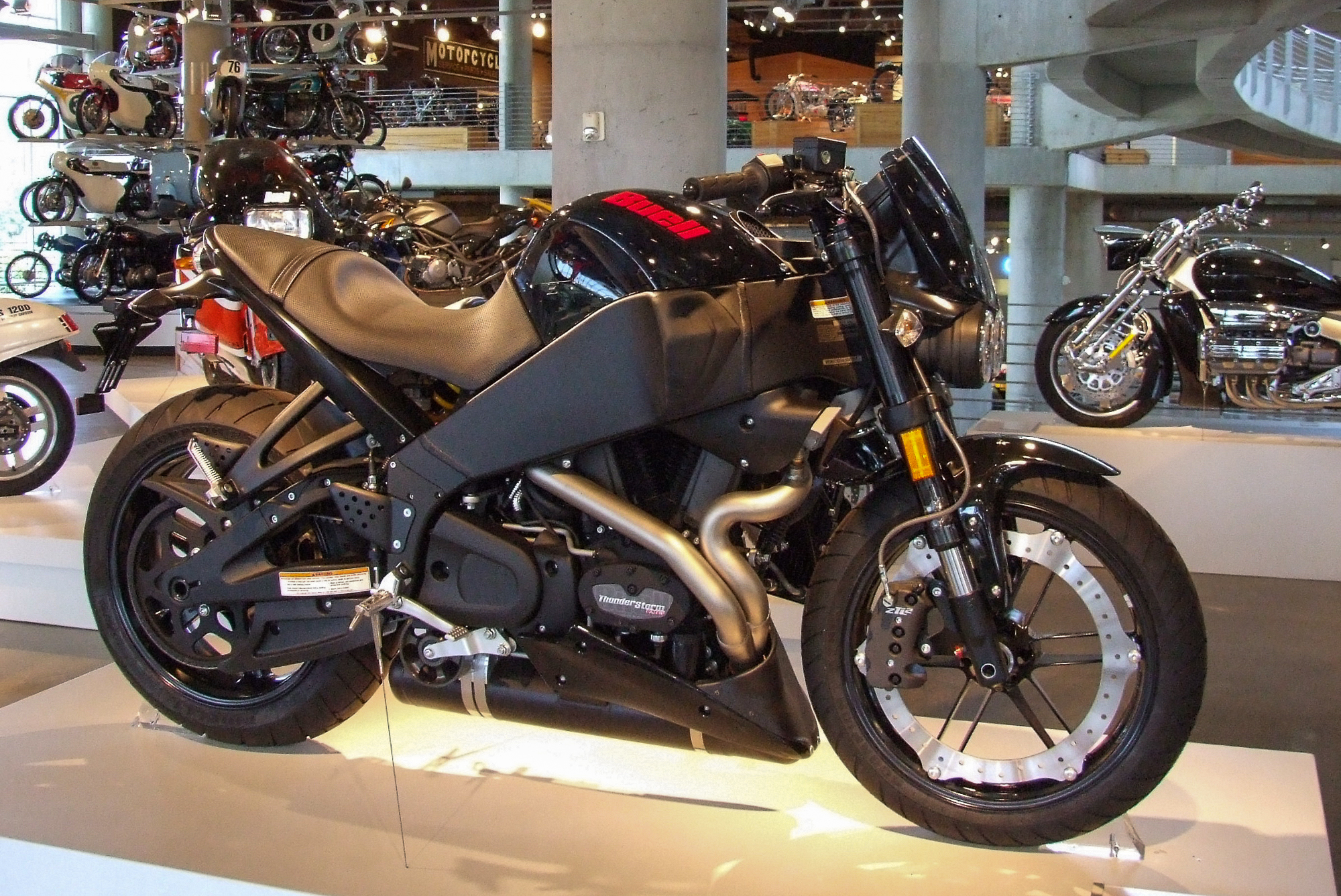
2009 Buell XB12S Lightning

The XB powertrain still had its roots with the Harley Sportster powertrain and was designed for both projects. Unfortunately, it was designed by Harley with minimum input from Buell. A turbocharger was to be sourced from Aerocharger to help pump the XB horsepower to 150 hp (110 kW), but the Aerocharger supplier deal fell through when Harley-Davidson decided to engineer one in-house. The project was a failure, despite "millions of dollars" spent.

Before the first XB was sold, the cost was well over the target, leading to a sales price increase from the original price of $7,995 to $9,995. It was a popular bike, but never sold at Harley marketing department's expected volume, partly due to the significantly higher price.

Buell introduced the XB frame in the 2002 Firebolt XB9R sport bike. The Firebolt XB12R was introduced in 2004 and was initially sold alongside the smaller displacement Firebolt XB9R. The Lightning came in 2003 and was marketed by Buell as a streetfighter motorcycle. The XB9 engines had a displacement of 984 cc (60.05 cu in), and the later XB12 engines had 1,203 cc (73.4 cu in). The XB12 engine had a longer stroke of 96.82 mm (3.812 in) compared to that of 79.38 mm (3.125 in) on the XB9. The cylinder bore size between both engines was identical at 88.9 mm (3.50 in).

The Buell Ulysses XB12X debuted in July 2005. It had seating, ergonomics, and long-travel suspension that are suited for use on unpaved and rough roads. Buell advertised the Ulysses as "the world's first adventure sportbike." For 2008, among other changes, XBRR oil pump and ignition timing systems have been changed tapping into the XBRR race bike as well as the addition of heated grips and increased turning fork swing from 54° to 74°. The Ulysses XB12XT differs from the Ulysses XB12X in several areas. It has a different front fender, unlike the Enduro-front fender that comes on the XB12X and lower fork protection is not as pronounced as on the XB12X, due to the intended purpose of the XB12XT which is more street than dirt oriented. Other major differences include the suspension which is completely different between the two bikes, being about an inch lower on the XB12XT and tuned more for street riding, vs. the XB12X's slightly taller and softer suspension better tuned for dirt use. Along with factory Hepco & Becker hard panniers and top box, tall windshield and a 30.9 in (785 mm) seat height, the XB12XT also has wheels that are approximately 1 lb (450 g) lighter than those found on the XB12X, which have added mass to make them stronger for off paved road use. The XB12XP is a police model that was available for the 2009 model year.

==== XB2 type ====
A different frame with more fuel capacity, longer swing arm & wheelbase, 23.8°/23.5° steering axis angle, more trail:

- Lightning Long XB12Ss
- Lightning Super TT XB12STT
- Ulysses XB12X
- Ulysses XB12XP
- Ulysses XB12XT

=== 1125-series (XB3, 2007–2009) ===
==== 1125R ====
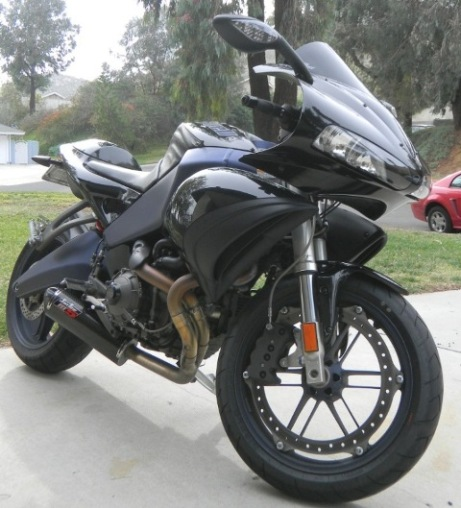
Buell 1125R 25th Anniversary Signature Edition

In July 2007, Buell announced the 1125R, a sport bike which departed from Buell's history of using Harley-Davidson Sportster based middle weight powertrains and tapping into the XBRR racing bike learnings. The Rotax Helicon powertrain uses four valves per cylinder, dual over-head cam, liquid-cooled 72 degree V-Twin displacing 1,125 cc and producing 146 hp (109 kW). It produces 83 ft⋅lbf (113 N⋅m) of peak torque but varies less than 6 ft⋅lbf (8.1 N⋅m) of torque from 3,000 to 10,500 rpm. There is a vacuum assist slipper clutch to give predictable drive performance in hard cornering and deceleration and a six-speed transmission.

The Helicon engine was developed and built by BRP-Powertrain in Gunskirchen, Austria southwest of Linz. The design had significant Buell input and was funded through Buell's cashflow. The 1125R did not have a full fairing, as that would have put it in the same class as Japanese sportbikes. Erik Buell agonized over this, saying "it's about not listening to the voice of the customer." Cycle World magazine said the 1125R was "a bit of an oddity." The bike was initially released with a crude spark map, leading to criticism of the bike at low speeds. The Rotax Helicon also ended up costing significantly more by production time due to fluctuation in exchange rates.

==== 1125CR ====
For the 2009 model year, Buell introduced the 1125CR, a version of the 1125R in the cafe racer style. It was done in response to customer feedback, which said the 1125R was not what was wanted, and causing Buell to shelve plans for a streetfighter, going for a cafe racer instead. The 1125CR has a longer swingarm, a longer wheelbase, and a shorter secondary drive ratio.

== Racing ==
=== Buell XBRR ===
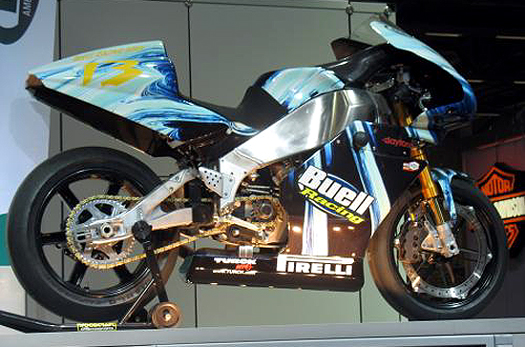
Buell XBRR

Buell produced a limited series of 50 XBRR (1,339 cc or 81.7 cu in, 150 hp or 110 kW) racing-only machines for factory-backed and privateer racing teams. The XBRR frame was a XB1/XB2 hybrid, the suspension came from Swedish manufacturer Öhlins, and the wheels were made of magnesium. It was the first model using the ZTL2 eight-piston caliper by Nissin.

=== Buell 1125RR ===
In 2009, Buell announced production of the 1125RR, also a race-only motorcycle. The bike was internally called the B2, aimed for the supersport market. Built from the 1125R, the 1125RR changes include a titanium exhaust, magnesium wheels, full fairings and a chain drive.

On September 9, 2009, Buell won its first AMA Pro racing championship. Rider Danny Eslick clinched the title at New Jersey Motorsports Park on Buell's 1125R model. On November 15, 2009, Buell won its first NHRA Pro Stock Motorcycle world championship. Rider Hector Arana clinched the title at the Southern California NHRA Finals on a Lucas Oil backed Buell.
