= Jeffrey Bleustein =

American business executive

Jeffrey L. Bleustein
- Citizenship: American
- Occupation: Chief Executive Officer at Harley-Davidson

Jeffrey L. Bleustein is an American business executive, and the former Chief executive officer of Harley-Davidson. He is credited with helping save the company from possible bankruptcy in the 1980s, and leading the company's resurgence as the dominant motorcycle manufacturer in the United States.

== Early life and education ==
Bleustein is a native of Scarsdale, New York, and comes from a family with a background in manufacturing. His grandfather, an immigrant from Poland, ran a company called Atlas Baby Carriage in the Bronx, along with his father and two of his uncles.

After graduating from A.B. Davis High School, he earned a bachelor's degree in mechanical engineering from Cornell University, and a master's degree and PhD in engineering mechanics from Columbia University. He spent a year as a NATO postdoctoral fellow in England.

== Early career ==
From 1966 to 1971, Bleustein was an associate professor of engineering and applied sciences at Yale University. His work on piezoelectricity along with related work by Yuri Vasilyevich Gulyayev on a new type of transverse surface acoustic wave led to that wave being called the Bleustein-Gulyaev wave.

In 1971, he decided to enter the corporate world and took a job as a technology consultant with American Machine and Foundry, commonly known as AMF, a sporting goods manufacturer. He was considered the "golden boy" of AMF's engineering team. AMF had purchased the Harley-Davidson motorcycle company in 1969. In 1975, AMF assigned Bleustein to help reorganize Harley-Davidson's engineering operations, which he described as "an overgrown blacksmith shop" at that time. He began commuting from New York to Milwaukee one day a week to manage the process.

== Career at Harley-Davidson ==
Bleustein became a Harley-Davidson employee in 1975, initially as vice president of engineering. AMF's ownership of Harley-Davidson was problematic, and by some accounts, the company was close to bankruptcy in the early 1980s.

Along with 12 others Harley-Davidson executives, Bleustein helped lead an $81.5 million leveraged buyout of the company in 1981.

He was promoted to senior vice president in 1988, executive vice president in 1990, president and Chief operating officer in 1993 and chief executive officer in 1997. He became chairman of the board in 1998.

In 2010, the Harvard Business Review called Bleustein one of "The 100 Best-Performing CEOs in the World, mentioning the $13 billion increase in the company's market capitalization during his tenure as CEO.

He stepped down as CEO in April, 2005 and was replaced by James L. Ziemer.

As CEO, Bleustein was known for holding large numbers of face-to-face meetings with stakeholders, including customers, employees, stockholders and suppliers. He was an advocate of the "free flow of ideas" He is credited with strengthening the dealer network and for Harley-Davidson's expansion to China, including opening dealerships in Beijing and Shanghai.

After accepting his first job at Harley-Davidson, Bleustein soon became an "avid biker" Early in his time with the company, he was embarrassed to discover that his new Harley-Davidson Sportster was leaking oil, and this motivated him to redesign the engine to eliminate the oil leak problem. He was responsible for other engineering innovations, including rubber engine mounts to reduce vibration, redesign of the iconic Harley-Davidson V-twin engine, and introduction of Kevlar drive belts.

He was an active participant in the Harley Owners Group, attending six or more events each year.

== Corporate boards and community service ==
Bleustein is a member of the board of directors of the Brunswick Corporation and the Kohler Company. He serves on the boards of the Medical College of Wisconsin and the Milwaukee Jewish Federation, and is a member of Milwaukee's Congregation Shalom.
