= Erik Buell =

American motorcycle racer

Erik F. Buell
- Born: April 2, 1950 (age 76); Pittsburgh, Pennsylvania
- Occupations: Motorcycle racer, engineer, designer, executive
- Known for: Founder: Buell Motorcycle Company, Erik Buell Racing
- Awards: Motorcycle Hall of Fame (2002); Motorcyclist Motorcyclist Of The Year (2011)

Erik F. Buell (born April 2, 1950, in Pittsburgh, Pennsylvania) is the founder, former chairman and chief operations officer of the Buell Motorcycle Company, which eventually merged with Harley-Davidson Corp. Buell is a pioneer of modern race motorcycle technology. Buell is also founder of Erik Buell Racing.

== History ==
=== Early years ===
Buell was raised on a farm in Gibsonia, Pennsylvania, and learned to maintain machinery at a young age.

In his teens, Buell began motorcycling. His first motorcycle was an Italian Parilla 90cc moped.

Buell later attended the University of Pittsburgh.

=== Motorcycles and motorcycle racing ===
Buell raced motocross before becoming interested in road racing in his early 20s. He became a part-time road racer on a Ducati in the AMA 'Superbike' class and a Yamaha TZ750 in 'Formula One', despite the aging race program at Yamaha.

During this period, Buell was employed as a motorcycle mechanic during the day and engineering student taking night classes at the University of Pittsburgh.

After receiving his degree in engineering in 1979, Buell took a job at Harley-Davidson after he went to Milwaukee, WI to obtain an interview and "beat my way in the door," as Buell put it.

While at Harley-Davidson, Buell was involved with concept motorcycles, Porsche-designed "Nova" V-four program, and was responsible for stability and refinements to the chassis design of the FXR series of cruisers, noted for their rubber-mounted engines. Buell used his racing experience to personally test Harley-Davidsons beyond normal riding limits, and implemented an electronic chassis testing regimen at H-D that greatly improved their handling.

=== The Barton ===
Buell learned of the small, privately held general-purpose engine maker Barton (based in Great Britain) in 1981. He bought their limited production racer, powered by a water-cooled 750 cc Square Four two-stroke engine. (The Barton was featured prominently in the 1980 motion picture "Silver Dream Racer".) The bike was poorly manufactured and was constructed from cheap materials. The engine was plagued with issues. Buell felt that with his engineering background, he could improve the engine. As parts failed he re-engineered them to increase reliability, and in many cases saw performance gains with his modifications. The chassis was a lost cause, and Buell designed his own chassis. The engine often failed before completing a race.

Buell first raced a prototype of his bike, using the mostly stock Barton engine, in the summer of 1982 at the AMA National on the Pocono Speedway. He dubbed it the RW750 (RW standing for Road Warrior). During testing at Talladega, AL, the RW750 was clocked at a top speed of 178 mph (286 km/h). He raced in the 500 cc-dominated Formula One class (the Barton engine was designed prior to 1978 and was grandfathered into this class by AMA rules). He found some success at the local club levels despite the grossly overpowered, unrefined engine.

In 1982, Barton closed, and Buell was given the option to purchase the entire stock of spare engines and parts, drawings, and the rights to produce and sell the engine. Buell did so, but the shipment was delayed, and he missed the opportunity to make use of this new equipment and knowledge for the 1983 racing season. This delayed the development of the engine.

=== Leaving Harley-Davidson ===
With the stunted development, Buell's inquiry with his employer to gain engineering and financial support was declined due to reliability problems with the Barton engine. Buell then quit his job at Harley-Davidson to devote more time to racing.

=== The Buell Motor Company ===
By late 1984, Yamaha TZs were scarce (Yamaha had ceased production of the TZ series) and the competing Hondas were selling for around $30,000. Buell offered his RW750s under the 'Buell Motor Company' marque for $15,900 to press accolades. The American Machinist's Union Racing Team bought, tested and raced the first publicly sold RW750 ('RW750 number 2'), and gave it glowing marks.

In the Spring of 1985, the AMA announced that the Superbike class would supplant Formula One as the premier road racing class for the 1986 racing season, and the Formula One class would be discontinued, leaving Buell with no market for his creation.

=== Innovation ===
Despite this setback, Buell forged ahead and designed his first entry into the sportbike market, the RR1000. Using his connections at Harley-Davidson, he acquired a sizeable cache of unused XR1000 racing engines, the powerplant of a model he had ridden to a podium finish at the 1983 Road America Battle of the Twins National, so he had confidence in this engine's potential in the sport market. Around this powerhouse, he designed a stiff, extremely light chassis that incorporated the unconventional rubber-mounting system known as "the Uniplanar" that became a patented engineering trademark of Buell sport bikes. The wrap-around fairing design had lower aerodynamic drag than a few 21st century sportbikes.

Buell's design incorporated the engine as a fully stressed member of the frame. Capping the engineering firsts in this design was Buell's use of a horizontally mounted suspension located beneath the engine utilizing a shock that operated in reverse of the conventional compression-rebound design. Fifty RR1000 models were produced during 1987–1988 before the supply of XR1000 engines was depleted.

Buell saw the newly developed 1203 cc Harley-Davidson Evolution engine being used in their 'Sportster' model line as solid base platform to further tune the performance and handling qualities of his bikes. The RR1200 model was introduced during 1988 with a redesigned chassis to incorporate a modified version of this different engine design. Through 1989, 65 were produced for sale.

In 1989, Buell introduced the RS1200 model, a two-seat version of the RR1200 marketed to riders who demanded both world-class performance and desired passenger capacity. 105 of these models were produced through 1990.

In 1991, Buell incorporated a five-speed transmission mated to the 1203 cc engine. Buell responded to Harley's revised engine mounting points by further improving an already innovative design: the RS chassis. Stainless steel braided brake lines and a six-piston front brake caliper. Later that year, Buell introduced a single-seat version of the RS1200 model, dubbed the RSS1200. It won approval of the industry press for its lean, clean lines. Combined production of RSS and RS models totaled 325 through 1993.

=== Buell American Motorcycles, subsidiary of Harley-Davidson ===
In 1987, Devin Battley smuggled Erik Buell onto a cruise ship for the Harley-Davidson annual dealer's meeting. Battley told Harley-Davidson then-CEO, Vaughn Beals, that Buell could give the company a performance image with no risk to Harley. They set up a table for Buell to speak with dealers; by the end of the cruise he had deposits and orders for 25 motorcycles. Attendees such as Bill Bartels, Don Tilley, Devin Battley and Frank Ulicki later become some of Buells most successful dealers.

In the 1990s, Buell reformed his house as the 'Buell Motorcycle Company' in which Harley-Davidson invested a 51% interest. Harley-Davidson bought all of Buell Motorcycle in 2003, and distributed Buell motorcycles through select Harley-Davidson dealerships. Erik Buell remained responsible for the engineering and design.

Buell led the company to create some of the most innovative, usable sport bikes under the XB series of Buell Motorcycles. Using inventions like a twin spar hollow aluminum frame to house the fuel and create chassis rigidity, a hollow swing arm to house the oil, and an underslung exhaust pipe, he was able to keep the center of gravity low for optimum handling. He used the 45° V-twin Harley-Davidson, re-worked to produce 30% more horsepower than the standard HD Sportster engine. For the 2008 model year, Buell introduced a water cooled, 1125cc, 72 degree V-twin engine developed in cooperation with Rotax for the Buell 1125R and 1125CR(2009) producing 146 bhp.

On October 15, 2009, amid the economic crisis, Harley-Davidson announced that production of Buell motorcycles would cease on October 30, 2009.

=== Erik Buell Racing ===
In November 2009, after being dropped by Harley-Davidson, Buell launched Erik Buell Racing. The firm produced and supported race-only versions of the Buell 1125R. His most recent creations, unrestricted by Harley-Davidson, were the EBR 1190RS, the 1190RX and the 1190SX. The 1190 models were powered by the similar water cooled, 72 degree V-twin that powered the Buell 1125. The engines were re-engineered with a displacement of 1190cc, with a substantial power boost to 185 hp and 102 ft-lbs. of torque.

During July 2013, the Wall Street Journal reported Hero MotoCorp, a maker of high-end street motorcycles bought a 49.2% stake in Erik Buell Racing LLC, for $25 million. The remaining stake is held by founding chairman and chief executive Erik Buell.

=== FUELL e-vehicle partnership ===
It was announced in 2019 that Buell has partnered with French financiers via an Indiegogo campaign to form an Electric Vehicle company called "Fuell". This new company will offer an electric bicycle called the "Flluid" and motorcycle called the "Fllow". The Fllow is touted to have an urban ride range up to 150 miles, fast charge time under 30 minutes, and the acceleration of a superbike with a curb weight of only 400 lbs. Fuell filed for chapter 7 bankruptcy on October 16, 2024.

== Honors ==
In 2002, Buell was inducted into the AMA Motorcycle Hall of Fame.

The very first (prototype) RW750 eventually found its fate as pieces in Buell's barn workshop, as is common for development machines. In 1998, a group of long-time Buell employees and supporters worked in secret to reassemble this bike using as many original pieces as they could find, hand crafting any missing pieces to bring it as close as possible to its 1983 racing condition. A new Buell 850 cc engine out of a D-sports racing car was used as the powerplant. The rebuilt bike was given to Buell at the 1998 Race of Champions event, as a complete surprise to him.

The September 2011 issue of Motorcyclist magazine named Buell the 2011 Motorcyclist Of The Year.
