= Buell XB9 =

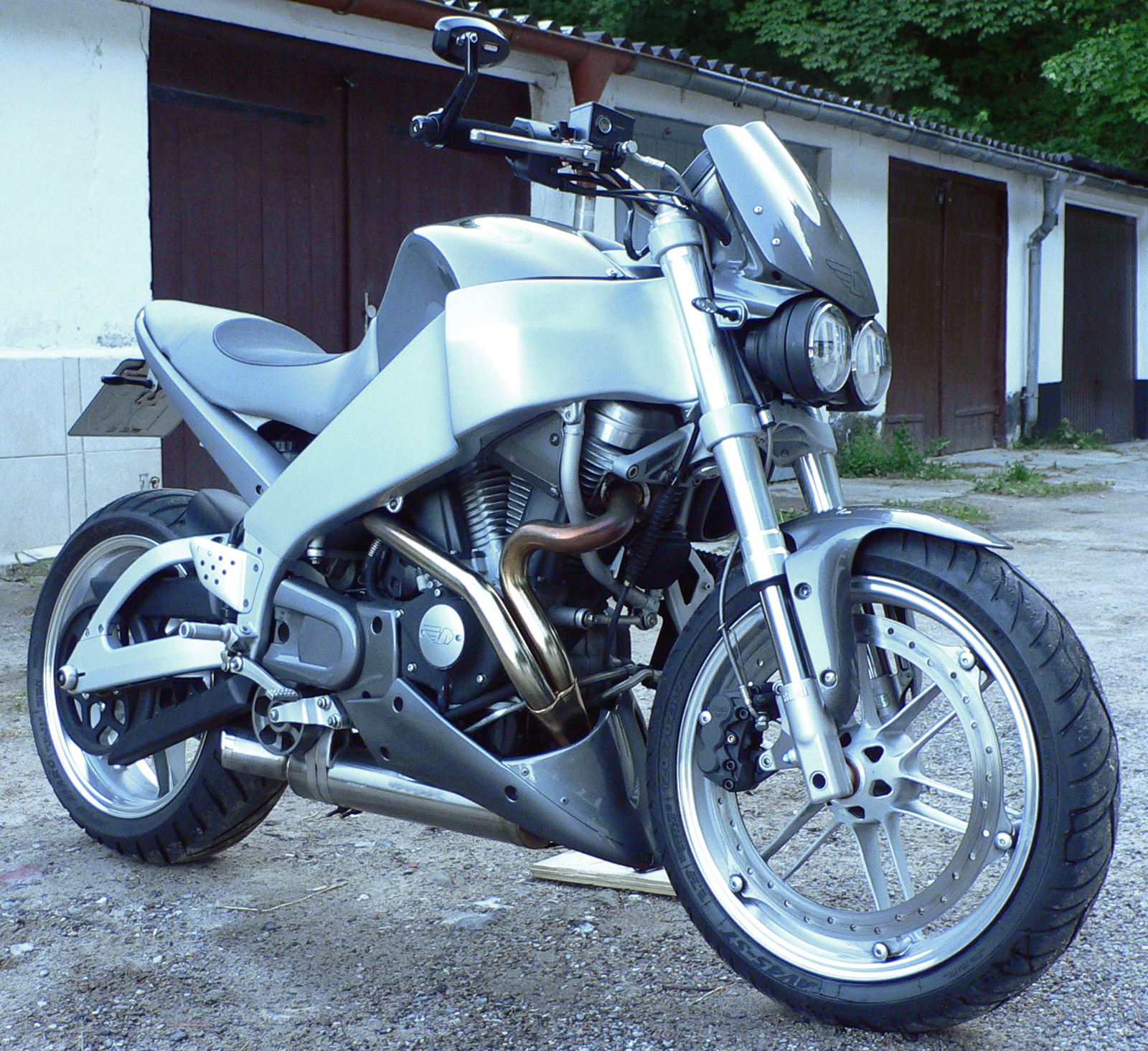
- Manufacturer: Buell
- Also called: Lightning
- Production: 2000–2009
- Class: Sport bike
- Engine: 984 CC

The Buell XB9 is a series of sport bikes that was made by Buell Motorcycle Company in the United States.

== Specifications ==
The XB9 is powered by a Harley-Davidson 45° V-twin four-stroke engine, with a total displacement of 984 cm^{3}, air and oil cooled and a 10:1 compression ratio. Lubrication is dry sump, the exhaust passes under the engine with a 2 into 1 layout. Distribution takes place via two valves controlled by push-rods and rocker arms with hydraulic valve lifter and hydraulic valve clearance compensation. Powering it is an electronic fuel injection system, with a 45mm throttle body. The engine is assisted by a 5-speed gearbox which transfers power through a toothed belt final drive.

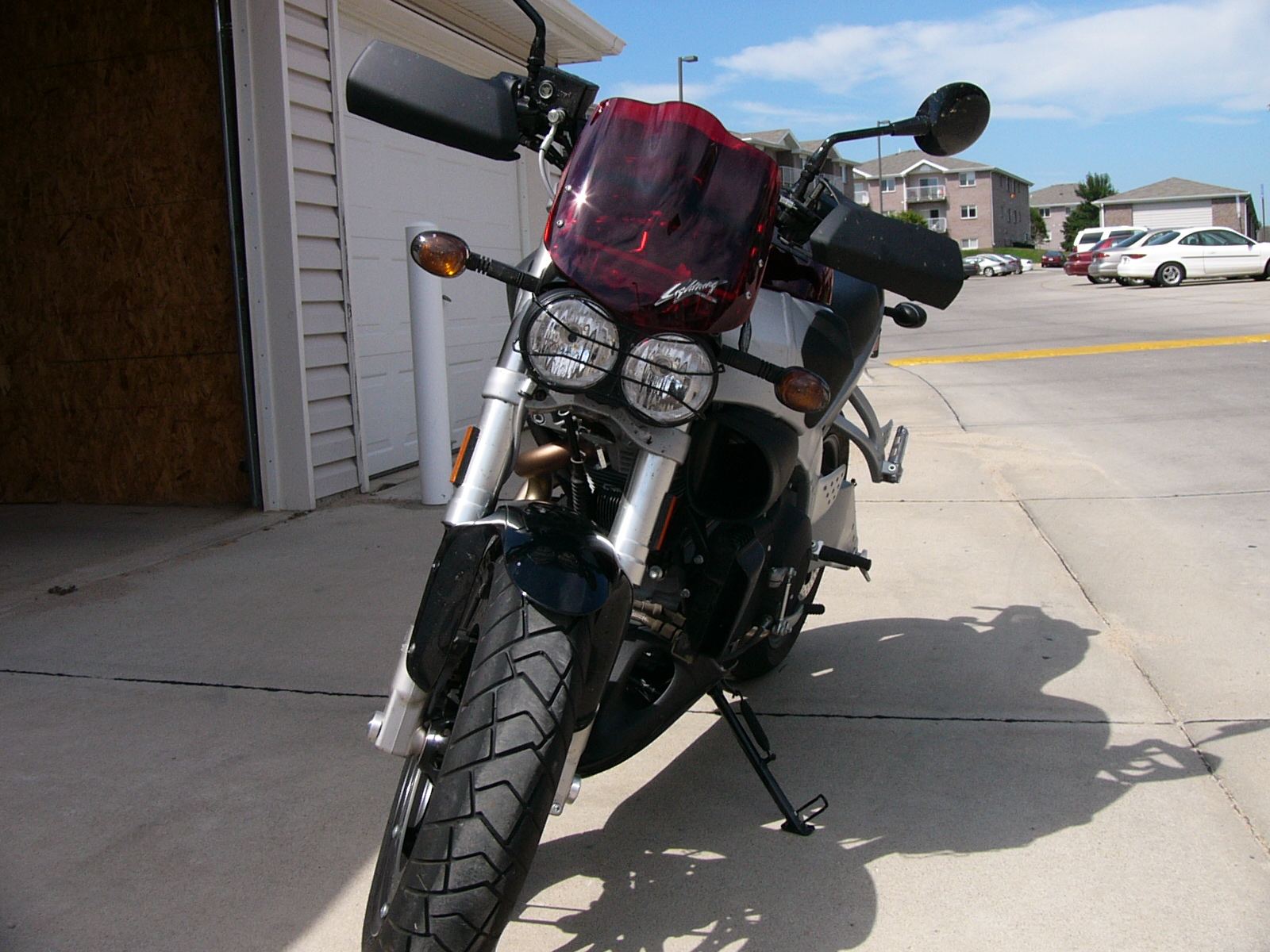
XB9SX

Unlike the Buell XB12 series models introduced in 2004, which have a larger 1203 cc Harley-Davidson Derived air-cooled V-twin engine, the XB9 has a slightly shorter stroke and smaller displacement. This gives the XB9 a higher engine speed, approximately 1000 rpm higher.

The Buell XB9 uniquely stores its fuel inside the frame of the motorcycle. Where a gas tank would traditionally be on motorcycle is where the air-box lives on the XB9. This is done to lower the center of gravity, and theoretically improve the handling and weight distribution of the motorcycle. The oil is similarly stored in the swing arm of the motorcycle and lowers its center of gravity still. Because of this combination of elements, and its dry sump oil system, the XB9 requires a fuel pump and oil pump to function.

Another unique characteristic of the XB9 is the way its front brakes are mounted. Instead of mounting its brakes to the center of the wheel near and around the wheel bearing, its front brake disks are mounted to the exterior portion of the rim in six hard points. This is done because traditional brake mounting systems require more spokes or larger, heavier spokes in order to deal with braking forces. When the brake is mounted to the outside of the wheel, it is mounted to the strongest part of the wheel. This eliminates the necessity for a stronger wheel spoke and allows for lower weight and less unsprung mass.

== Versions ==
In 2002, the first evolution of the bike was introduced, the Firebolt XB9R, a version with a semi-fairing. Then came the 'Lightning XB9S, a naked version with a small fairing and a shorter rear frame, inspired by the previous S1 Lightning and X1 Lightning models.

At the end of 2004, the Lightning CityX XB9SX arrived, a version with motocross-style elements (handlebar, handguards, protective grille placed on the headlight) and a 92 HP engine at 7500 rpm.
