= Erik Buell Racing =

American company

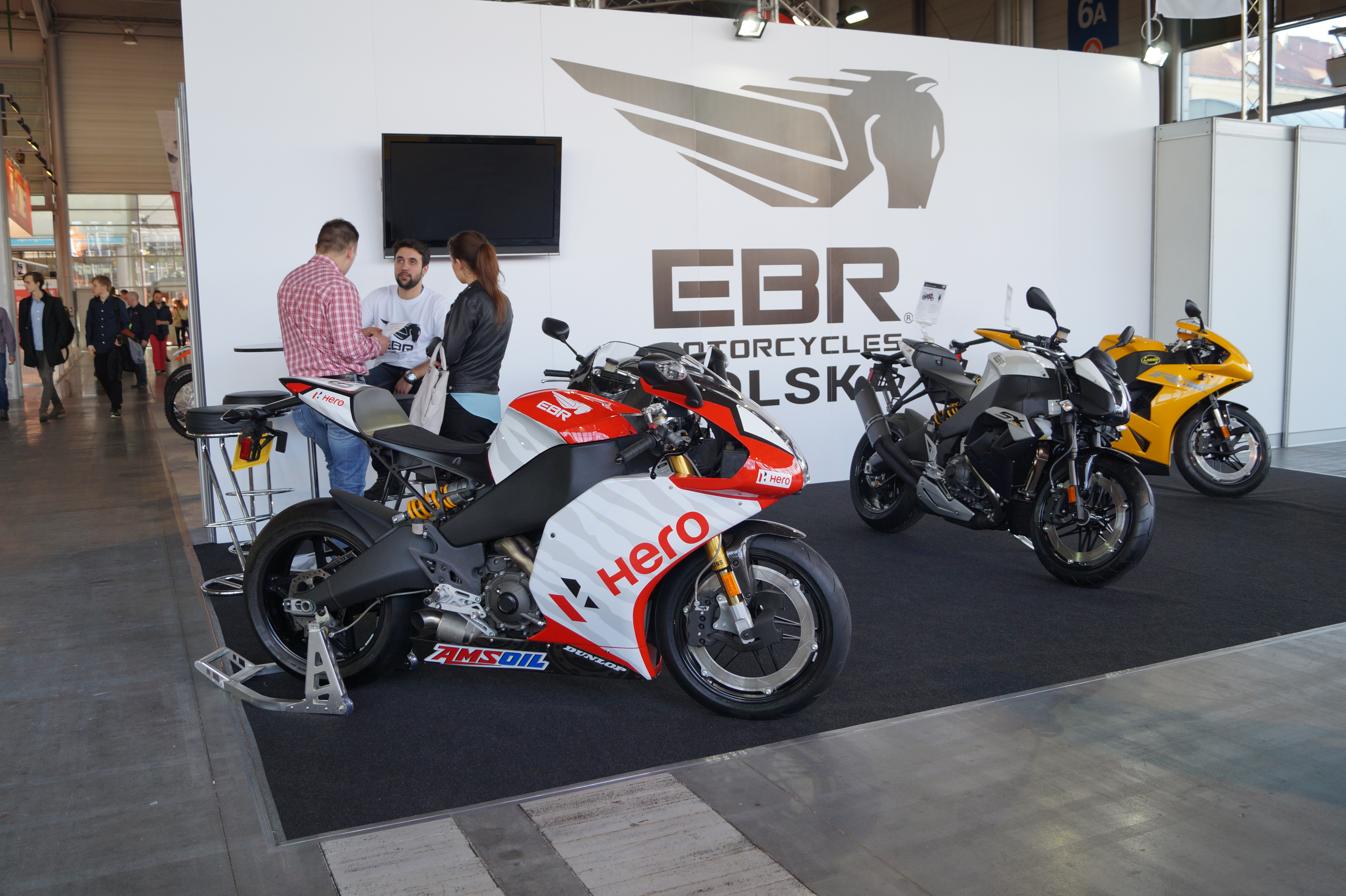
- EBR sport bike at a trade stand in Poznań, Poland during early 2015
- Industry: Motorcycle sport
- Founded: November 2009
- Founder: Erik Buell
- Headquarters: East Troy, Wisconsin, USA
- Products: Motorcycles, engineering services
- Owner: 2016 Liquid Asset Partners LLC previously Erik Buell, and Hero MotoCorp
- Website: erikbuellracing.com

Erik Buell Racing (EBR) is an American motorcycle sport company which produces street and racing motorcycles, based in East Troy, Wisconsin, USA. The business entered receivership in April 2015. After two previous attempts, the business remnants were sold in January 2016 to Liquid Asset Partners (LAP), an American organization specializing in the purchase and liquidation of failed businesses. Liquid Asset Partners kept the company intact and company movement resumed on March 1, 2016, with the first new model rolling out on March 17, 2016. The company's EBR title was eventually retired in 2021 as the company transitioned to Buell Motorcycle Co.

== History ==
Erik Buell founded Erik Buell Racing in November 2009 following the shutdown of his previous company, Buell Motorcycle Company, by parent company/majority stakeholder Harley-Davidson. Erik Buell Racing's first efforts were directed toward production of complete, race-only motorcycles and parts based on the Buell 1125R production model, under license from Harley-Davidson, to support privateer racers.

On July 1, 2013, Hero MotoCorp, a motorcycle manufacturer based in India, acquired 49.2% stake in the company for $25 million. The two companies announced that EBR will distribute Hero motorcycles and scooters in North America starting in the summer of 2014.

=== Bankruptcy and Receivership ===
On April 15, 2015, Erik Buell Racing filed for receivership, with a reported $20 million of liabilities, and ceased all operations including closing down their website.

On August 7, 2015, it was announced that Bruce Belfer, an engineer from New Jersey with a background in metal fabrication, had agreed to purchase Buell's manufacturing assets for $2.25 million, while Hero MotoCorp. of India paid $2.8 million for Buell's consulting business. Belfer stated his intention to work with company founder Erik Buell to re-establish the business as soon as possible, including a manufacturing base in East Troy where Buell previously employed 130 people producing high-end motorcycles.

The deal failed as Belfer was unable to secure financing for the $2.25 million purchase price, and the official receiver filed to re-sell the assets in a new round of bidding, so the remnants of Erik Buell Racing returned to auction on December 10, 2015. The auction had no bidders, and a move where the court-appointed receiver sought to sell the assets by accepting a pre-emptive offer from a private liquidation-company specializing in breaking-up company remnants was blocked by the judge, to allow more time for any potential new buyers to prepare their submissions, rescheduling the hearing for early January 2016.

In January 2016, the remnants of Erik Buell Racing were sold to Liquid Asset Partners for just over $2 million, with the proceeds going to creditors (including Mito Tech and Porsche Design Group) and to former employees for unpaid wages. Liquid Asset Partners stated an intention to try to find a buyer experienced in motorcycle manufacture to re-establish the business. Liquid Asset Partners has kept the company assets intact and indicates they will continue to do so until a buyer or major investor can be found. Motorcycle production resumed on March 1, 2016, and the first new motorcycle, a limited edition "Stars and Stripes" themed 1190RX rolled off the assembly line on March 17, 2016. EBR's company title eventually evolved to Buell Motorcycle Co., with the company's current website indicating that Buell continues bolstering its dealer network expansion while offering the Hammerhead 1190, 1190SX naked variant, and the Super Cruiser to the public and securing pre-orders for its new touring motorcycle model, the SuperTouring. Retrieved January 2, 2025.

== Models produced ==
=== 1190RR ===
The first focus of Erik Buell Racing, the 1190RR was an upgraded and restyled version of the Buell 1125R. Used for professional racing in several race classes, the bike has been a part of several race and championship placings.

=== 1190RS ===
In June 2011, Erik Buell Racing officially announced their first street model, the EBR 1190RS, a sport motorcycle with a 1,190 cc (72.6 cu in) 72° V-twin engine delivering 175 hp (130 kW). Released as a 2012 model, only 100 are to be made.

=== 1190RX ===
On 16 October 2013, Erik Buell Racing officially unveiled their first production motorcycle, the EBR 1190RX. Like the previous 1190RS, the 1190RX is a sport motorcycle with 1,190 cc (72.6 cu in) 72° V-twin engine, but delivering 185 hp (138 kW) and 101.6 lb-ft (peak) of torque.

=== 1190SX ===
On Wednesday, June 11, 2014, at the famed Indianapolis Motor Speedway in Indianapolis, Indiana, Erik Buell Racing officially unveiled their next production motorcycle, the EBR 1190SX. The 1190SX is a naked, streetfighter version of the 1190RX.

=== Black Lightning ===
On November 18, 2016, EBR announced for Spring of 2017, the Black Lightning a blacked-out version of the 1190 platform. Key changes included: different gearing, bike lowered 2 inches, a lower seat height, lower foot pegs, higher bars, and an optional comfort seat.

=== AX ===
Another street model was hinted on the Erik Buell Racing Website and mentioned in several articles. This model is signified by only two letters, AX. According to early magazine articles, this would have been an adventure version, based on the same platform as the 1190RX and 1190SX. A later article stated that the AX would not be based on the 1190, but would be a completely new motorcycle.

=== Other Models ===
In an interview with the editor of Cycle World magazine shortly after EBR entered receivership in April 2015, Erik Buell stated: "We've been working on the mainstream stuff. I can't talk about what was coming, but I will say some of it is much different than anybody would have expected. Stuff that is 18 months away from full-volume production that people would go "Holy s—t! EBR did that?!" It was all much higher volume and lower price."

== Racing ==
=== AMA Superbike ===
Erik Buell Racing has competed in the AMA Superbike Championship since 2011, initially using the 1190RR and then the 1190RS. EBR riders achieved several podium finishes. Riders have included Geoff May, Danny Eslick, Cory West, Larry Pegram, Mark White, Tony Agate, Mike Baldwin, Travis Peartree and Aaron Yates.

=== FIM World Superbike ===
EBR entered the 2014 Superbike World Championship season fielding two 1190RX for Geoff May and Aaron Yates. The American company signed a partnership with Italian team QB Racing, managed by Giulio Bardi and Claudio Quintarelli, who provided logistical support and a racing shop near Bergamo.

EBR became the first American OEM to earn Superbike World Championship points when Larry Pegram, entered as wild card, finished 14th in Race 2 at the Laguna Seca round.

For the 2015 season, Team Hero EBR race squad entered two riders, American Larry Pegram and Italian Niccolò Canepa, who competed in four events achieving some finishes, before the team folded due to financial failure of the main EBR business.
