= Yamaha XV250 =

Yamaha cruiser motorcycle

XV250
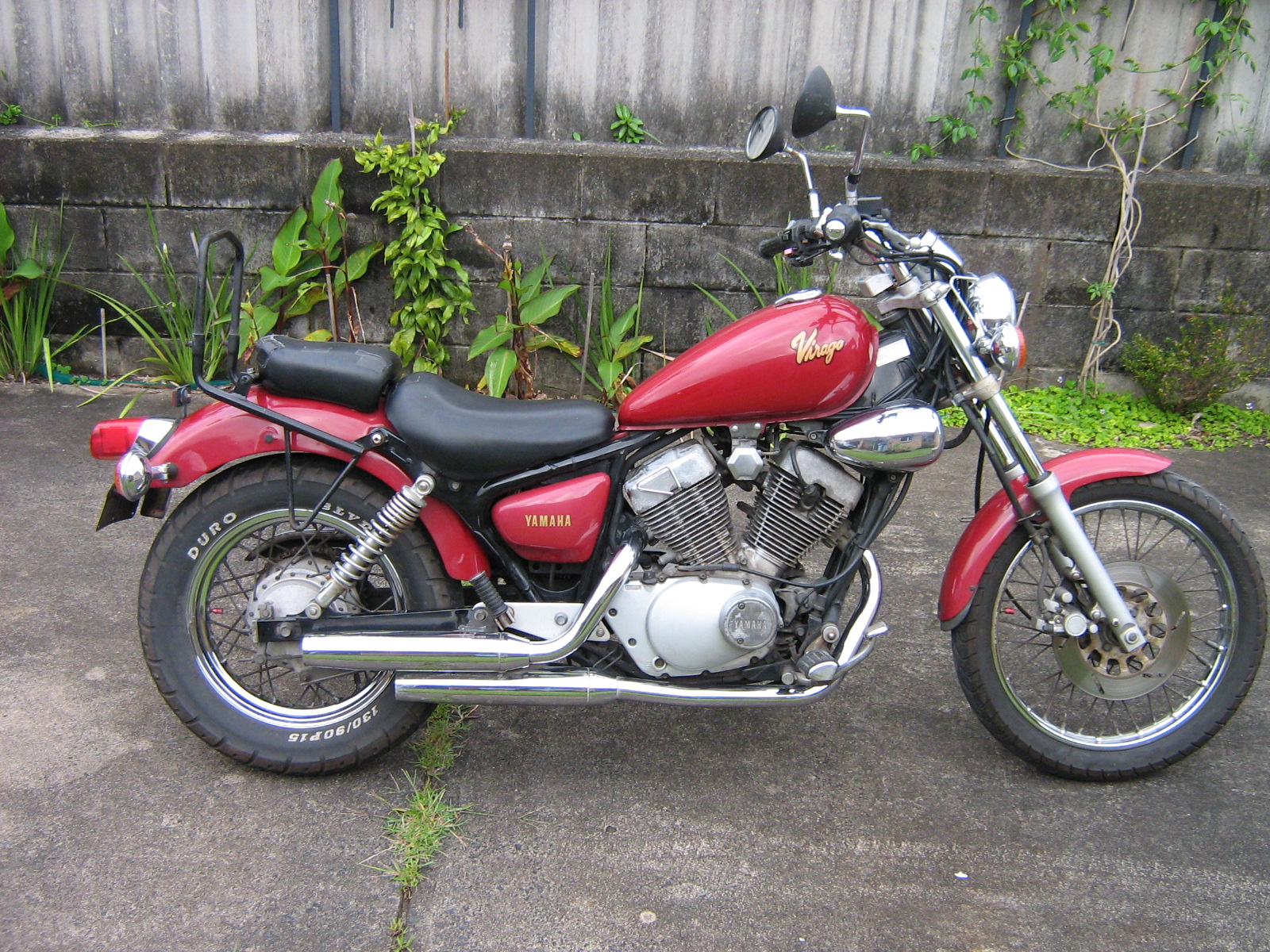
- Manufacturer: Yamaha
- Production: 1988 - Present
- Successor: Yamaha DragStar 250
- Engine: 249 cc, air-cooled, SOHC, 60-degree V-twin
- Top speed: 85 miles per hour (137 km/h) (claimed)
- Wheelbase: 58.7 in (1,490 mm)
- Weight: 302 lb (137 kg) (dry)
- Fuel consumption: 78 mpg_{‑US} (3.0 L/100 km)

The Virago 250 is an entry-level cruiser motorcycle built by Yamaha Motor Company. It has a top speed of 75mph. (Claimed top speed of 85)

== V Star 250 (2008–present) ==
In the 2008 model overview, the Virago 250 has been replaced with the V Star 250, but the specs remain very similar to the Virago 250.

- NOTE: Australia still offers the Virago 250 (XV250) as well as the V Star 250 (XVS250),

== Specifications ==
=== Official ===
General
Engine Type	249cc, air-cooled, SOHC, 60-degree V-twin
Horse power
Bore x Stroke	49mm x 66mm
Compression Ratio	10:1
Carburetion	26mm Mikuni
Ignition	Digital TCI
Transmission	5-speed
Final Drive	Chain
Chassis
Suspension/Front	33mm telescopic fork; 5.5" travel
Suspension/Rear	Twin shocks w/adjustable spring preload; 3.9" travel
Brakes/Front	282mm disc
Brakes/Rear	130mm drum
Tires/Front	3.00-18
Tires/Rear	130/90-15
Dimensions
Length	86.2" (~220 cm)
Width	32.1" (~81.5 cm)
Height	44.9" (~114 cm)
Seat Height	27" (~68.5 cm)
Wheelbase	58.7" (~150 cm)
Ground Clearance	5.7" (~14.5 cm)
Dry Weight	302 lb (~137 kg)
Fuel Capacity	2.5 G (~9.5 L)
Fuel Economy	78 mpg (~34 km/L)

=== Unofficial (Practical) ===
General
Fuel	Gasoline (Unleaded Petrol) or 1994 and before Super LRP
Max Load	350 lbs (~160 kg)
Instrument Panel	Turn lights, Neutral, Hi-beam
Mileage between oil changes	3000 mi (4800 km)
Air Filter	Foam (wet)
