= Buell 1125R =

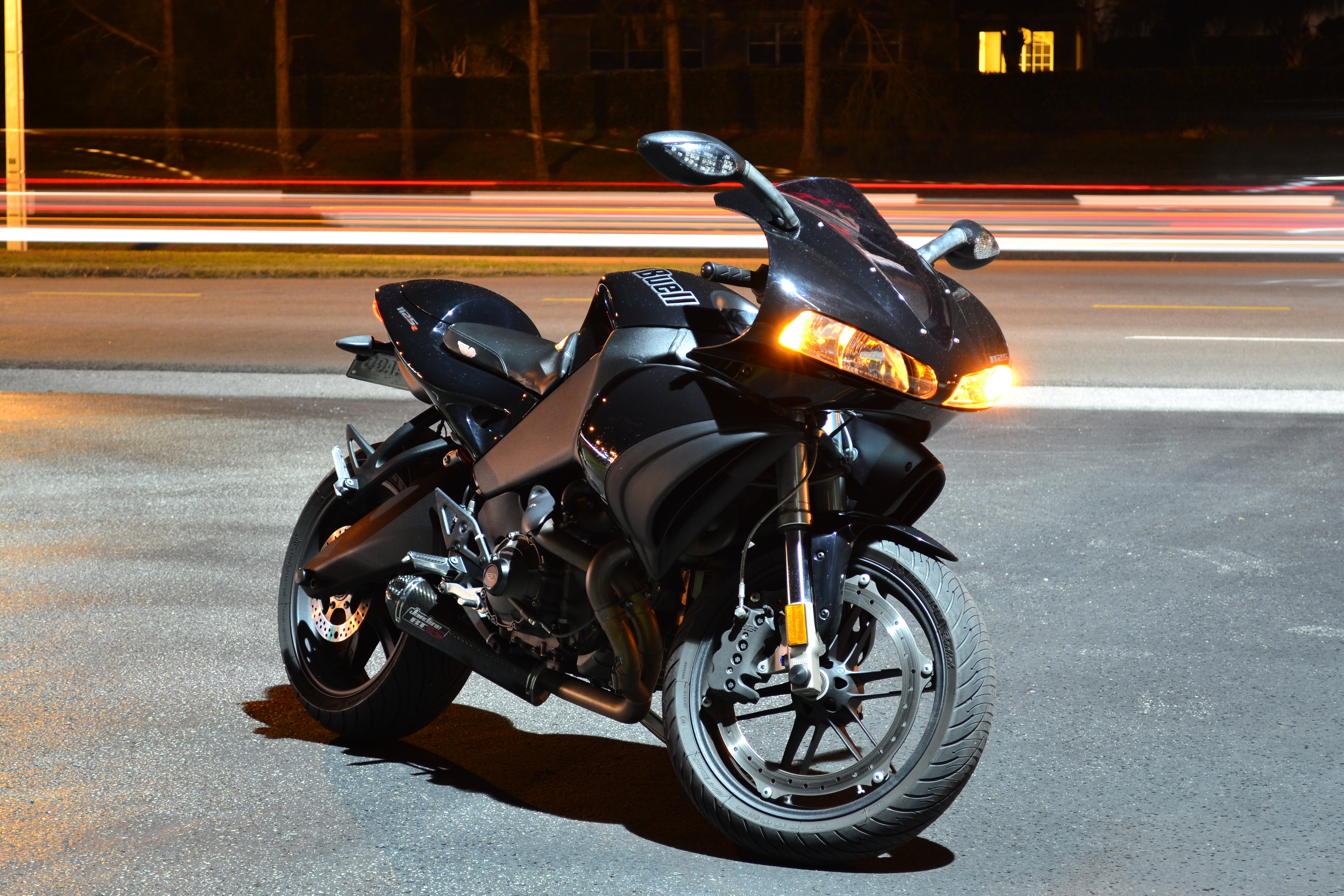
- Manufacturer: Buell
- Production: 2008–2009 by Buell; 2009– by Erik Buell Racing
- Class: Sport bike
- Engine: Rotax Helicon: liquid-cooled, 72° V-twin, 1,124.9 cc (68.65 cu in), DOHC, FI, 4 valves per cylinder, finger followers, shims, dual 61 mm (2.4 in) downdraft throttle bodies, ram-air intake, dry-sump lubrication
- Bore / stroke: 4.06 in × 2.66 in (103.0 mm × 67.5 mm)
- Compression ratio: 12.3:1
- Top speed: 158–161 mph (254–259 km/h)
- Power: 146 hp (109 kW) (claimed); 127.1–134 hp (94.8–99.9 kW) @ 9,800 rpm(rear wheel)
- Torque: 71.1–75.9 lbf⋅ft (96.4–102.9 N⋅m) @ 8,300 rpm(rear wheel)
- Transmission: 6-speed, belt drive, HVA slipper clutch
- Suspension: Front: Fully adjustable 47 mm Showa inverted fork, 120 mm (4.7 in) suspension travel Rear: Fully adjustable Showa coil over monoshock, 127 mm (5.0 in) suspension travel
- Brakes: Front: ZTL2 8-piston rim-mounted 14.8 in (375 mm) single disc Rear: 2-piston caliper,9.4 in (240 mm) disc
- Tires: Pirelli Diablo Corsa III; Front: 120/70 ZR-17 @ 3.50 in × 17 in (89 mm × 432 mm) cast aluminium wheel Rear: 180/55 ZR-17 @ 5.50 in × 17 in (140 mm × 432 mm) cast aluminium wheel
- Rake, trail: 21.0° / 84 mm (3.3 in)
- Wheelbase: 54.1 in (1,375 mm)
- Dimensions: L: 80 in (2,040 mm); W: 28.2 in (716 mm)
- Seat height: 30.5 in (775 mm)
- Weight: 375 lb (170 kg) (dry); 466 lb (211 kg) (wet)
- Fuel capacity: 5.6 US gal (21 L; 4.7 imp gal)
- Fuel consumption: 32.6–36 mpg_{‑US} (7.2–6.5 L/100 km; 39.2–43.2 mpg_{‑imp})
- Related: Buell Firebolt XB12R, Buell 1125CR

The Buell 1125R is a sport bike that was made by Buell Motorcycle Company in the United States. It was introduced in July 2007 for the 2008 model year. Production of road-going 1125Rs, and all Buell models, ceased in October 2009. In November 2009, Buell founder Erik Buell launched Erik Buell Racing, which initially produced race-only versions of the 1125R.

The 1125R is powered by a 1,125 cc (68.7 cu in) Helicon V-twin engine made by BRP-Powertrain (Rotax) of Austria. The liquid-cooled engine has a V angle of 72° and produces a claimed 146 hp (109 kW), with a rpm limit of 10,500. Motorcycle Consumer News tested 127.1 hp (94.8 kW) and 71.1 lbf⋅ft (96.4 N⋅m) at the rear wheel, while Cycle World reported 134.0 hp (99.9 kW) @ 9,800 rpm and 75.9 lbf⋅ft (102.9 N⋅m) @ 8,300 rpm. The two magazines reported top speeds of 158 and 161 mph (254 and 259 km/h) respectively, and 0 to 1/4 mile (0.00 to 0.40 km) times of 10.51 and 10.39 seconds at 134.32 and 134.09 mph (216.17 and 215.80 km/h).

The Helicon engine's 72° layout differs from Buell's previous V-twins, which were based on 45° air-cooled Harley-Davidson Sportster motors, modified for greater efficiency and output.

The 1125R includes a number of unconventional design attributes. The patented frame design houses the bike's fuel. The single, eight-piston front brake, called ZTL2, has a 375 mm (14.8 in) inverted rotor that is directly attached to the front wheel rim. This enabled Buell to design a front end that was lighter and more responsive than traditional designs. The bike also uses an exhaust under the engine for greater volume. The frame, front end and exhaust all contribute to Buell's main design aim of mass centralization. Instead of a drive chain the 1125R uses a drive belt, which does not require lubrication or adjustment.
