= EBR 1190RS =

Erik Buell Racing 1190RS
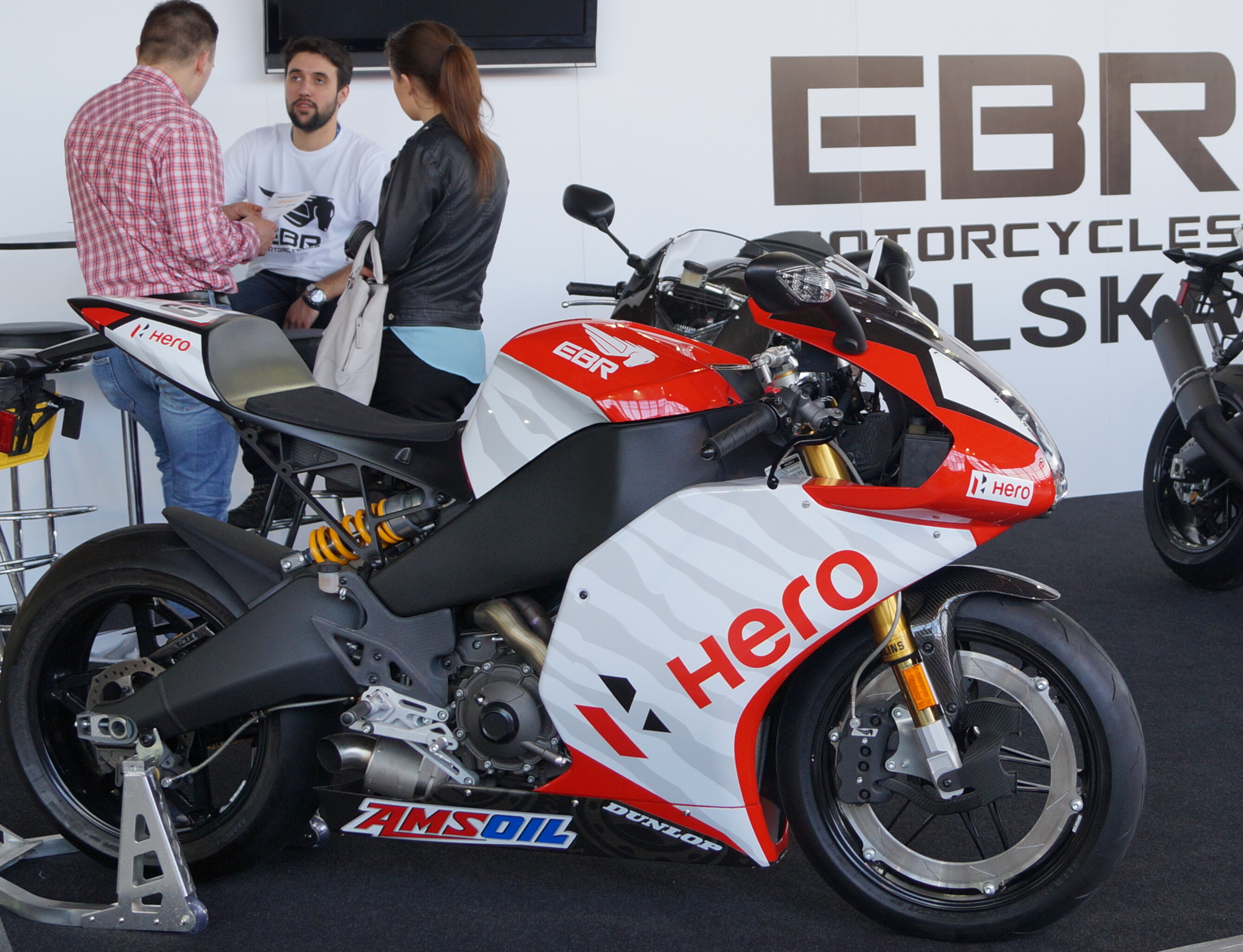
- Manufacturer: Erik Buell Racing
- Class: Sport bike
- Engine: 1,190 cc (73 cu in) liquid-cooled V-twin
- Power: 175 hp (130 kW) @ 9,750 rpm
- Torque: 97 lb⋅ft (132 N⋅m) @ 9,400 rpm
- Frame type: Aluminum frame with integral fuel reservoir
- Brakes: Front Brake - ISO finned rotor, 8 piston caliper with cooling duct
- Seat height: 30.5 in (770 mm)
- Weight: 369 pounds (167 kg) (dry); 397 pounds (180 kg) (wet)
- Fuel capacity: 4.5 US gal (17 L; 3.7 imp gal)

The Erik Buell Racing 1190RS is a sport bike that is manufactured by Erik Buell Racing in the United States. It was introduced in June 2011 for the 2012 model year. It is powered by a 1,190 cc (73 cu in), liquid-cooled V-twin engine, that delivers 175 hp (130 kW) @ 9,750 rpm. Only 100 units were planned for 2011 production.

== Awards ==
2011:

- Cycle World's Best Superbike
- Motorcyclist magazine's Best Dreambike
