= Vaughn Beals =

American businessman (1928–2018)

Vaughn L. Beals Jr.
- Born: January 2, 1928; Massachusetts, U.S.
- Died: August 19, 2018 (aged 90); Gig Harbor, Washington, U.S.
- Known for: President, Harley-Davidson
- Awards: Automotive Hall of Fame distinguished service citation Motorcycle Hall of Fame (2008)

Vaughn L. Beals Jr. (January 2, 1928 – August 19, 2018) was an American businessman who was a CEO of Harley-Davidson between 1981 and 1989, and chairman from 1981 to 1996. He was inducted to the Motorcycle Hall of Fame in 2008.

== Early life and education ==
An only child, Beals was born and raised in the Boston area. Although neither of his parents finished high school, Beals was a standout student and his high school guidance counselor encouraged him to apply to Massachusetts Institute of Technology instead of his first choice, Northeastern University. Beals earned bachelor's aeronautical engineering at Massachusetts Institute of Technology. After his earning his degree, he worked for Cornell Aeronautical Laboratory in Buffalo, New York where he met and married his wife, Eleanore Woods. Subsequently, he returned to the Massachusetts Institute of Technology and earned his master's degree in aeronautics.

Beals then worked at North American Aviation and Cummins as engineer and executive. He was CEO, chairman, and president of Formac (Washington Iron Works) in Seattle, a company that made large engines and logging equipment. In 1975, Beals was recruited by the conglomerate American Machine and Foundry (AMF), where he was hired to oversee engineering of new products for Harley-Davidson.

== Harley-Davidson buyout and leadership ==
At the time Beals was hired, Harley-Davidson was struggling with quality control issues and sales of its motorcycles had decreased significantly, losing market share mostly to Japanese imports. Partly because AMF was unwilling to invest in the company, in 1981, Beals and 12 other investors, including Willie G. Davidson, initiated a highly leveraged $80 million buy out of Harley-Davidson that took the company private at the equivalent of 25 cents per share. After touring several Japanese motorcycle plants, Beals concluded that Harley-Davidson's problems were not foreign imports, but rather the company's own mismanagement. As a result, he initiated the use of just-in-time delivery and other manufacturing reforms, after seeing these practices in use at the Honda Marysville Motorcycle Plant in Ohio. Beals also directed a number of changes in the company's motorcycles designed to make them more comfortable to ride and operate. Beals also directed creation of Harley Owners Group in 1983, today the world's largest factory-sponsored motorcycle club.

Following the successful buyout and turn-around of Harley-Davidson, Beals purchased the Holiday Rambler company, a manufacturer of recreational vehicles. The acquisition did not prove profitable, and Beals eventually sold the company for $50 million in 1996.

== Retirement and later life ==
After his retirement from Harley-Davidson, Beals and his wife Eleanore Woods Beals, an alumna, established the Woods-Beals endowed chair at Buffalo State College in 2004. It was the institution's first endowed chair.

Beals died at the age of 90 in Gig Harbor, Washington where he and his wife spent their summers. At the time of his death, he was survived by his wife of 67 years, their two daughters, five grandchildren and five great-grandchildren.
