= Harley Owners Group =

Company-sponsored motorcycle club

- Abbreviation: HOG
- Formation: 1983
- Type: Company-sponsored club
- Members: 1,000,000+
- Affiliations: Harley-Davidson
- Website: www.hog.com

The Harley Owners Group (HOG) is a sponsored community marketing club, operated by Harley-Davidson for enthusiasts of that brand's motorcycles. The HOG is "the grandaddy of all community-building efforts," serving to promote not just a consumer product, but a lifestyle. The HOG has also served to open new revenue streams for the company, with the production of tie-in merchandise offered to club members, numbering over one million strong, making it the largest factory-sponsored riding club in the world. The Harley-Davidson community was the prototype for the ethnographic term subculture of consumption, defined as "a distinctive subgroup of society that self-selects on the basis of a shared commitment to a particular product class, brand, or consumption activity."

The Harley Owners Group was created in 1983 as a way to build longer-lasting and stronger relationships with Harley-Davidson's customers, by making ties between the company, its employees, and consumers. HOG members typically spend 30% more than other Harley owners, on such items as clothing and Harley-Davidson-sponsored events. Much of the intent of this branding effort is presenting Harley-Davidson as an American icon, with the focus on authenticity and pride in being American-made. All of this is credited with turning flagging sales around, and allowing the Harley-Davidson company to grow again.

The name HOG comes from the word used to describe Harley-Davidson motorcycles. It is also Harley's corporate stock ticker symbol.

== Organization ==
There are two categories of Harley Owners Group member: full members and associate members. To become a full member there is only one prerequisite: the candidate must own a Harley-Davidson motorcycle. Candidates who don't meet this criterion can become associate members by enrolling under (in effect being sponsored by) a full member—typically this will be a family member and/or passenger who rides along with a full member. Membership benefits include free admission to the Harley-Davidson Museum, favorable insurance rates, motorcycle shipping, mileage and member year recognition, rallies and events, and camaraderie.

Once a motorcycle owner is a member at the national level, he or she is then eligible to join one or as many local chapters as he or she wishes. It isn't required to join a local H.O.G. Chapter.

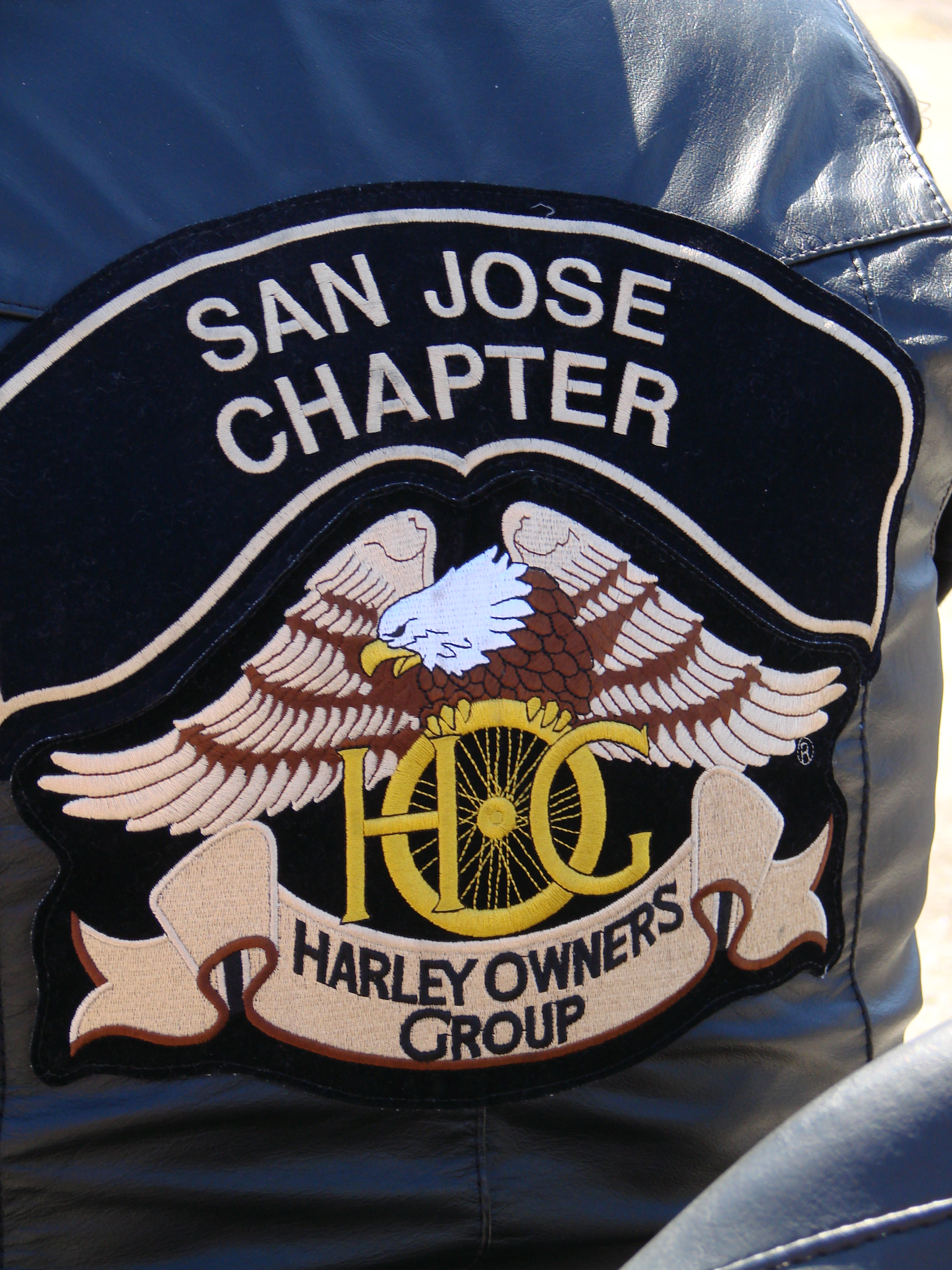
HOG San Jose Chapter colors on a jacket.

Each Harley-Davidson dealership has the opportunity to sponsor a local HOG Chapter. Some do not, but no chapters exist without a link to a sponsoring dealership and one Chapter per Dealership. Chapters, both in the US and internationally are supported by Harley-Davidson employees based in Milwaukee, WI, with Regional H.O.G. Managers throughout the United States and H.O.G. Chapter Managers at the dealership level.

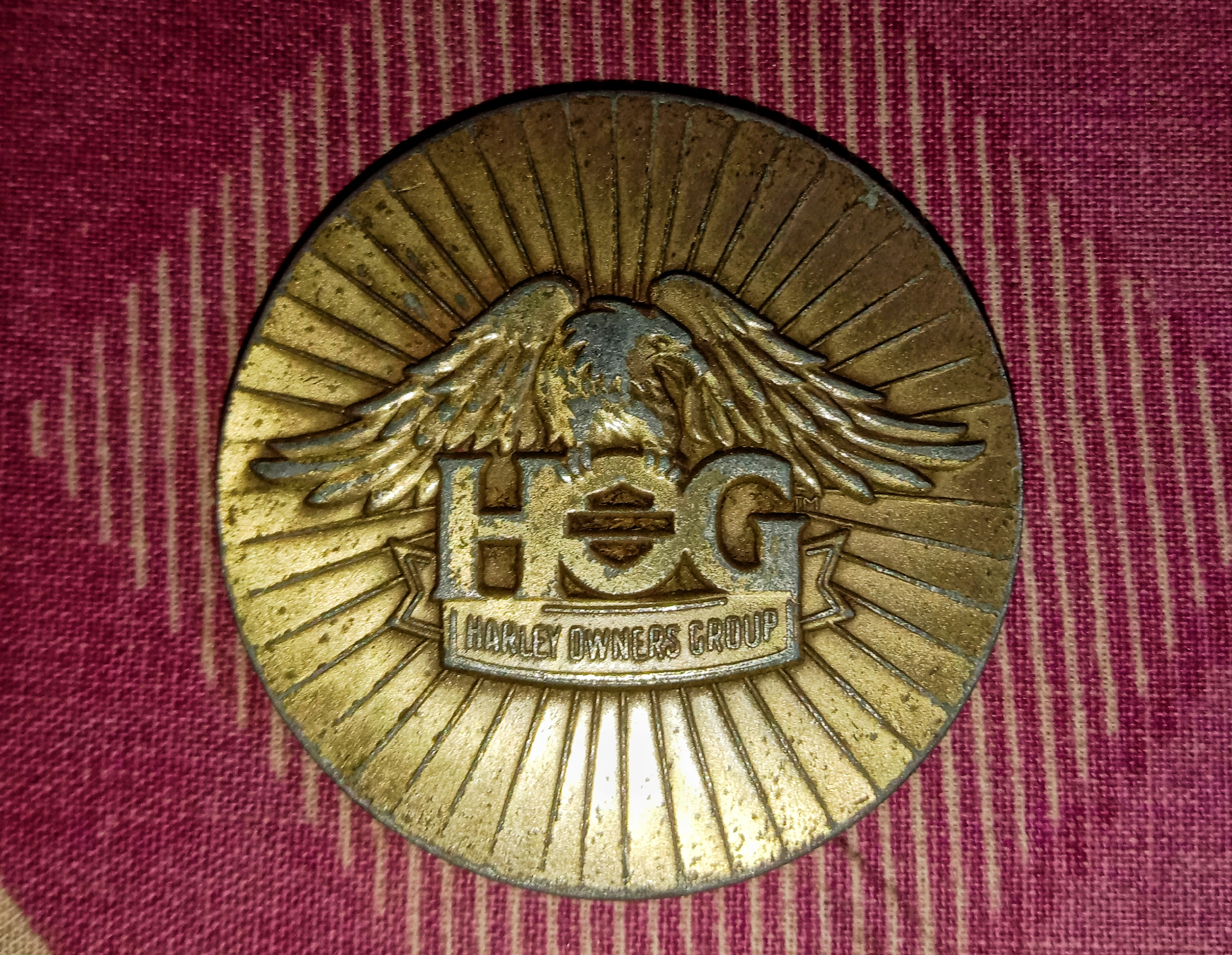
A HOG medallion photographed in India

In some circumstances, where a sponsoring dealership closes, a chapter can continue without a sponsoring dealer. In about 2014, this was expanded (with some special circumstances) to two Chapters per dealership.

Chapters usually, but not always, elect officers from within their membership, produce a newsletter, and organize events throughout the year. Most events are ride-related. HOG Chapters are managed by volunteers. Some chapters collect dues from members to subsidize the costs of events and the administrative costs of running the chapter.

== Events ==
On the chapter level, most HOG events are member-only rides with guests required to sign waivers. Many chapters host annual rallies either individually or collectively to cover a wider area (either states or countries) that are open to all HOG members regardless of chapter affiliation. HOG themselves host several larger scale events and rallies that are open to all members.

== Charitable work ==
In the United States, HOG's official charity is the Muscular Dystrophy Association. HOG chapters are encouraged to support the MDA and/or other charities, though supporting a charity is not a requirement of a HOG chapter.

== See also ==
- Outline of motorcycles and motorcycling
