= Police vehicles in Hong Kong =

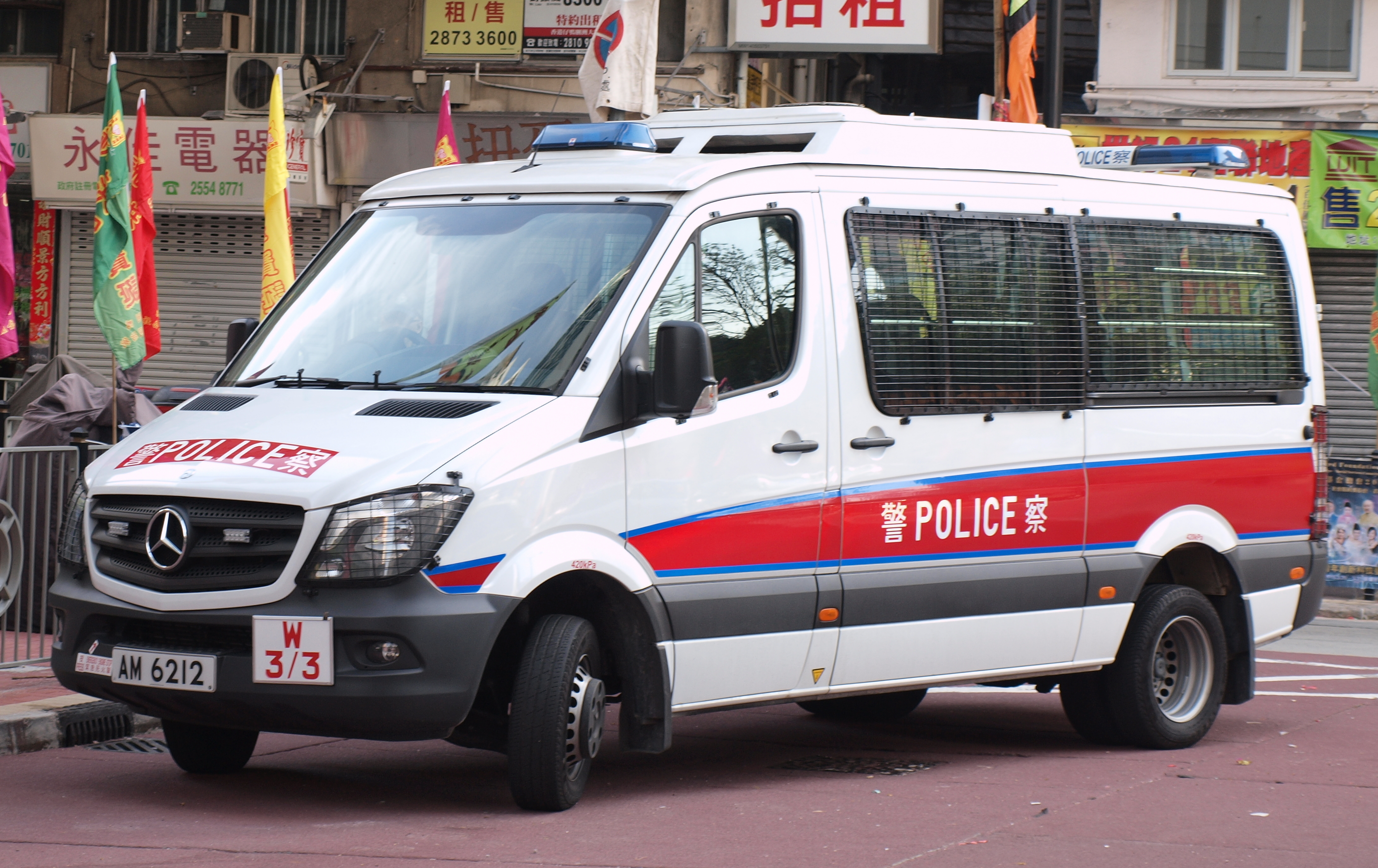
One of the most commonly seen police vehicles in Hong Kong, a Mercedes-Benz Sprinter van.

Police vehicles in Hong Kong are vehicles of the Hong Kong Police Force (HKPF), vehicles differ considerably depending on the duties of the departments that the vehicle is assigned to. One of the most commonly seen police vehicles in Hong Kong is the Mercedes-Benz Sprinter police van, which is mostly used by district stations and the Emergency Unit, one of the roles expected of it is rapid response to 999 emergency calls with regards to road safety and public safety.

== Current vehicles ==
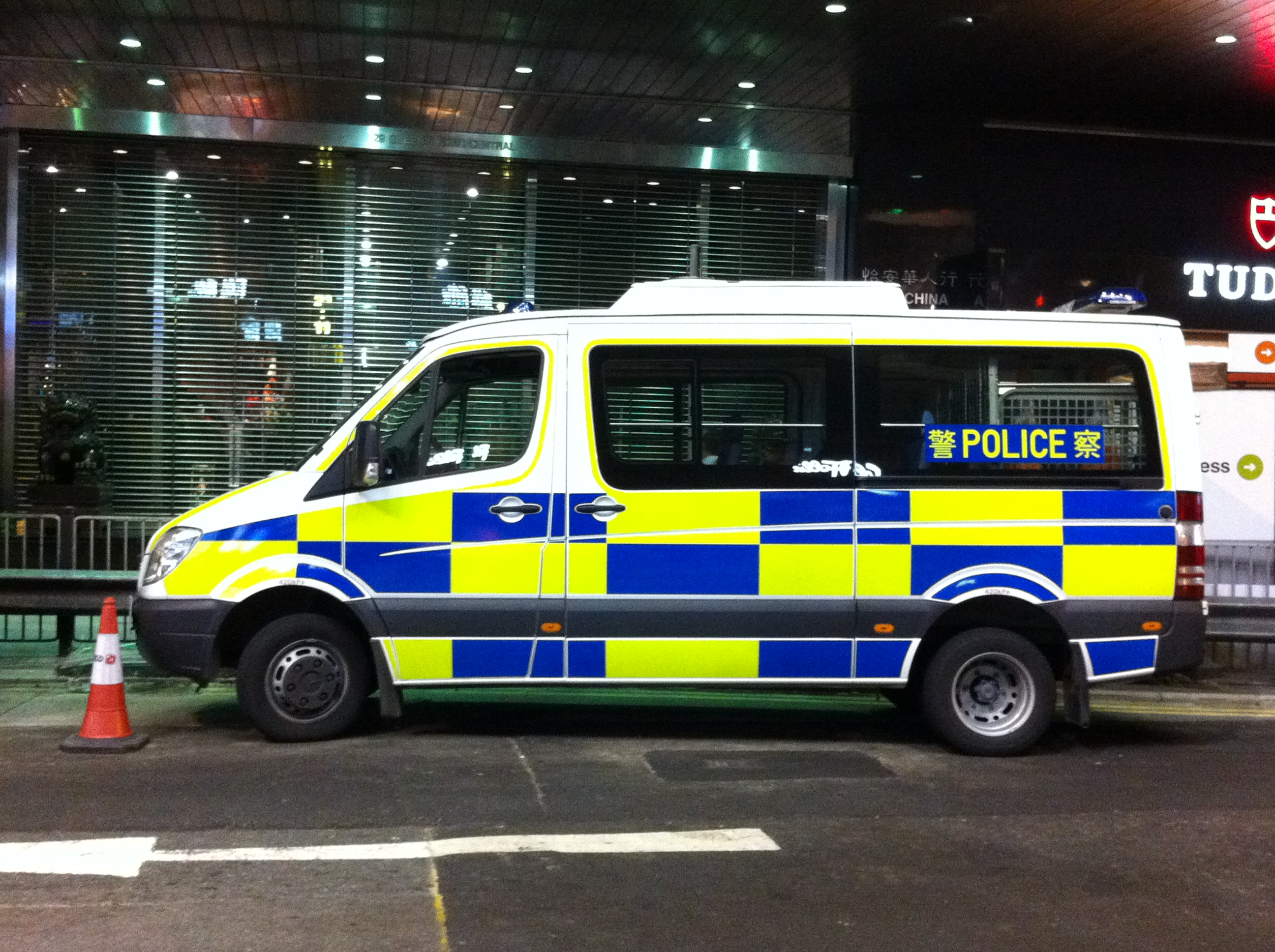
A Hong Kong Police Force Traffic Division Mercedes Sprinter van with Battenburg markings.

Most police vehicles in Hong Kong follow the British "jam sandwich" livery and are white, with a blue and red 3M retroreflective stripe around on the sides of the vehicle with wording "警 POLICE 察" in white. Traffic division vehicles are in white, with blue and lime Battenburg markings on the sides of vehicles, and the wording "警 POLICE 察" in lime on a blue background. Armoured personnel carriers specially designed for the Police Tactical Unit, are wholly dark blue and with wording "警 POLICE 察" on a light blue background in white on the sides of the vehicle. During British rule and up until the 1980s Hong Kong Police vehicles were painted dark navy blue, which is only retained by tactical APC today. Most police vehicles in Hong Kong are equipped with both red and blue emergency vehicle lighting. The vehicles which are allocated at the Hong Kong International Airport having an additional yellow emergency vehicle lighting and yellow roof top. All police vehicle are government property and therefore, have a licence plate which starts with "AM".

Since 2008, the Hong Kong Police Force have brought in the use of Battenburg markings for new police vehicles of the regional traffic branches. Traffic police vehicles the HKPF use typically are made by Mercedes Benz, BMW and Honda, making purchases of BMW motorcycles in 2001, Honda motorcycles in 2005, and 235 BMW motorcycles in 2011.

The Hong Kong Police Force also have unmarked police vehicles in order to catch and arrest criminals in act of crime. Such vehicles include the discreet high performance BMW 5 Series 535i Touring car, Infiniti Q70S and the unexpected Toyota Camry (XV 70) 2.5 . The force operates unmarked police vehicles for surveillance to gather evidence of any criminal offence. In addition, for security purposes, armoured cars specially designed for the VIP Protection Unit (Hong Kong) and bulletproof tactical police vehicles specially designed for the Special Duties Unit have no markings also.

The HKPF acquired six "Saber-Toothed Tigers", armoured vehicles to address riots, from the Guangzhou-based car company Huakai Vehicles in 2022.

This is a list of current vehicles (incomplete):

- Audi A6 3.0T Avant - patrol car
- Brammo Enertia Plus LE - electric motorcycle (10 ordered for trials)
- BMW R900RT - motorcycle
- BMW 5 series - car
- BMW 5 series Touring 535i - car
- Ford Mondeo - car
- Ford Super Duty - Armoured Personnel Carrier based on Ford F-550 by China
- Ford Econovan MAXI - van
- Honda CB250P - motorcycle
- Honda CB350P - motorcycle
- Honda VFR800P - motorcycle
- Honda Stepwgn - car
- Hyundai Atos - car
- Hyundai Sonata - car
- Hyundai Trajet - MPV
- Infiniti Q70S 3.7 - unmarked car
- Isuzu Trooper - SUV
- Isuzu NPR - lorry
- Isuzu LT132 / LT133 / LT134 - bus
- Iveco Daily - van
- Kia Cerato - unmarked car
- Kia Cerato
- Land Rover Defender 90 / 110 / three-axle - patrol SUV
- Land Rover Discovery - patrol SUV
- Lexus CT200h - patrol car
- MAN 13.220 HOCL/R / China Kong CK1999 bodywork - bus
- MAN LE14.224 - truck
- Mazda 6 - unmarked
- Mercedes-Benz Sprinter 314D - patrol van
- Mercedes-Benz Sprinter 518 CDI - patrol van
- Mercedes-Benz T2 609D / 711D - PTU van
- Mercedes-Benz Vario 814D / 815D (Trooper) - PTU van
- Mercedes-Benz SK Series 2527 - truck
- Mercedes-Benz Actros 1831 - tractor
- Mercedes-Benz Actros anti riot water cannon
- Mercedes-Benz Atego - bus
- Mercedes-Benz Unimog U5000 Armoured Personnel Carrier
- Mitsubishi Super Exceed - mpv
- Mitsubishi i MiEV - car
- Mitsubishi Pajero - SUV
- Mitsubishi Fuso Canter - lorry
- Mitsubishi Fuso Rosa - bus
- Nissan Tiida Latio- car
- Nissan Cefiro - car
- Nissan Urvan E24 - van
- Nissan Urvan E25 - van
- Nissan UD PKC212 - truck
- Suzuki Hustler- car
- Sinotruk howo - anti riot water cannon
- Toyota Alphard (GGH20) 3.5 – unmarked Full-size MPV
- Toyota Alphard Hybrid (GGH20) 2.4 Hybrid – unmarked Full-size MPV
- Toyota Corolla (E160) – car
- Toyota Camry (XV70) – car
- Toyota Land Cruiser Prado – SUV
- Toyota Prius – car
- Toyota Echo Verso – car
- Toyota Hiace – van
- Toyota Coaster – (SWLB) bus
- Vectrix ZEV - variant of Vectrix Maxi-Scooter, electric motorcycle
- Volkswagen Caddy - car
- Volkswagen Passat - car
- Volkswagen Phaeton - car
- Volvo S70 - car
- Audi A6 estate – car
- Renault Fluence ZE – car

=== Patrol vehicles ===
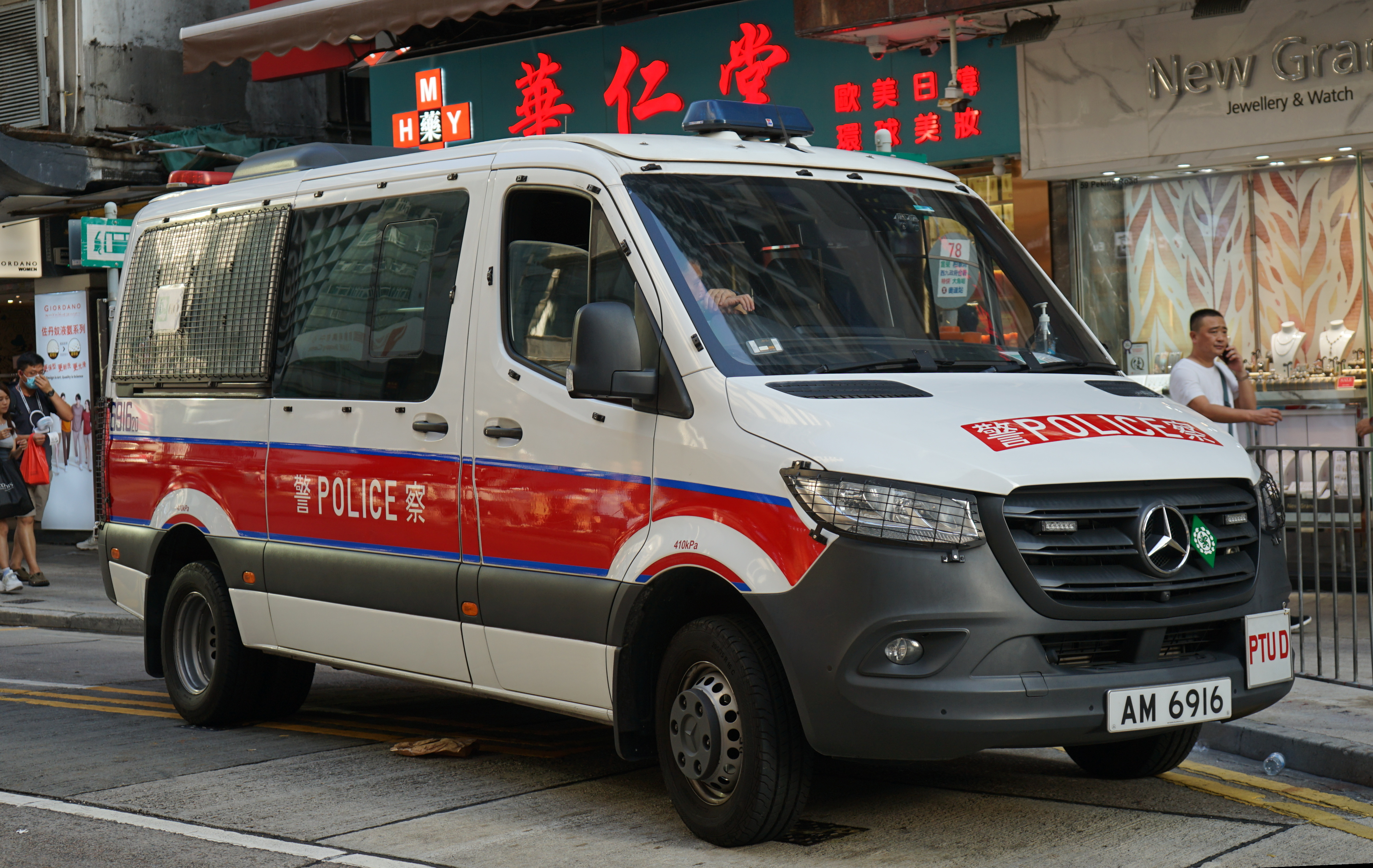
Mercedes-Benz Sprinter van.

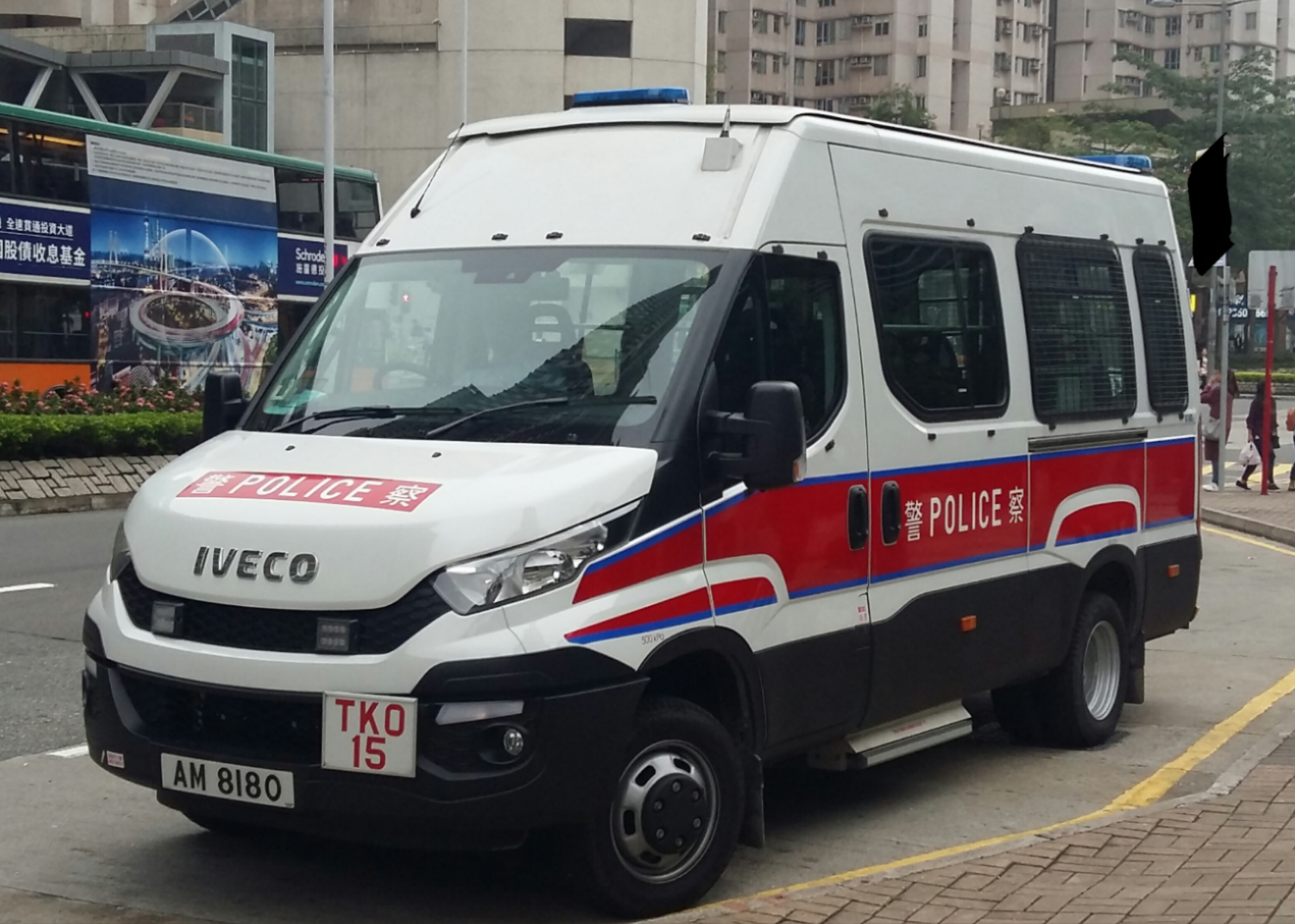
Iveco Daily

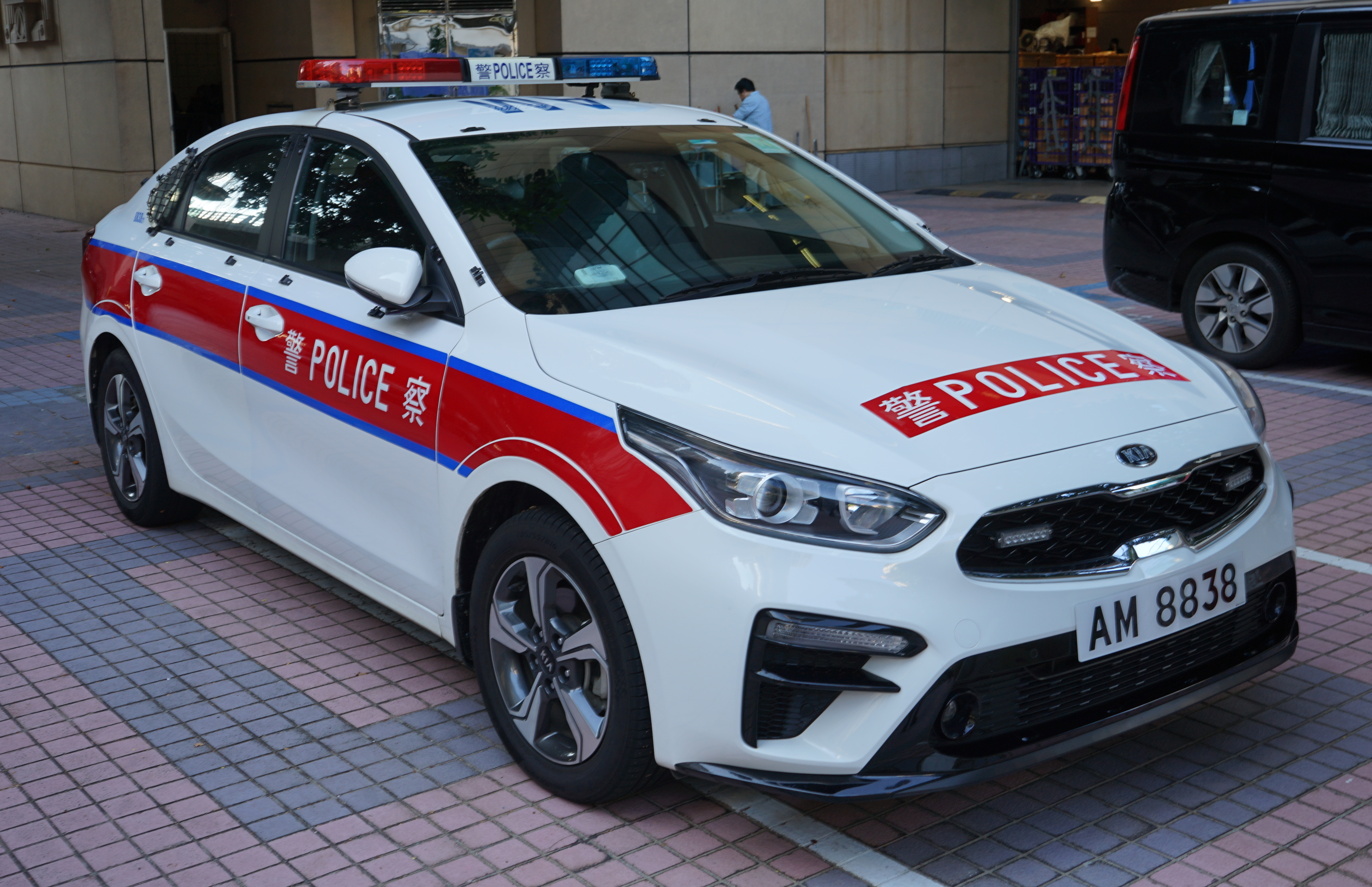
Kia Cerato

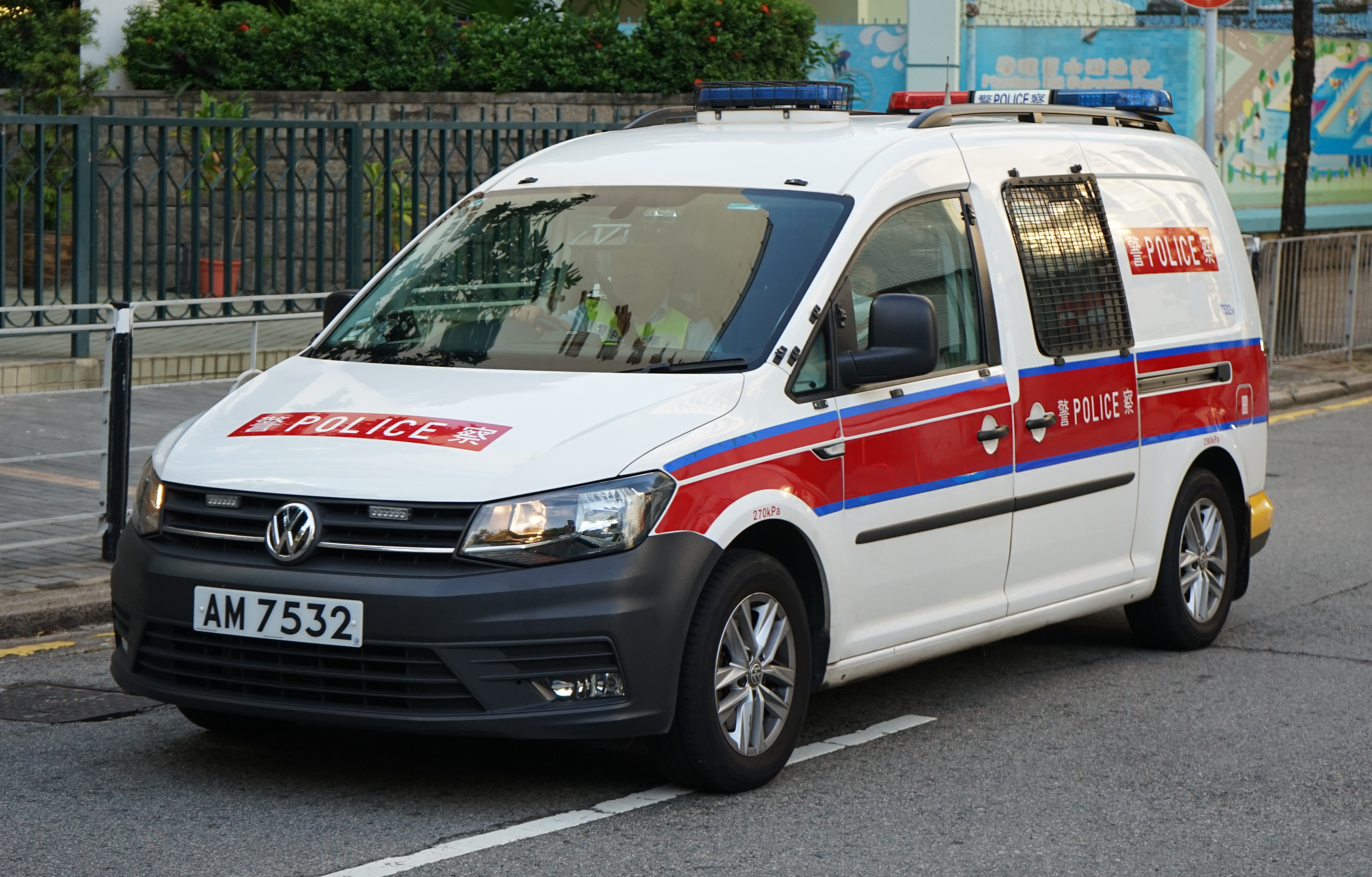
Volkswagen Caddy

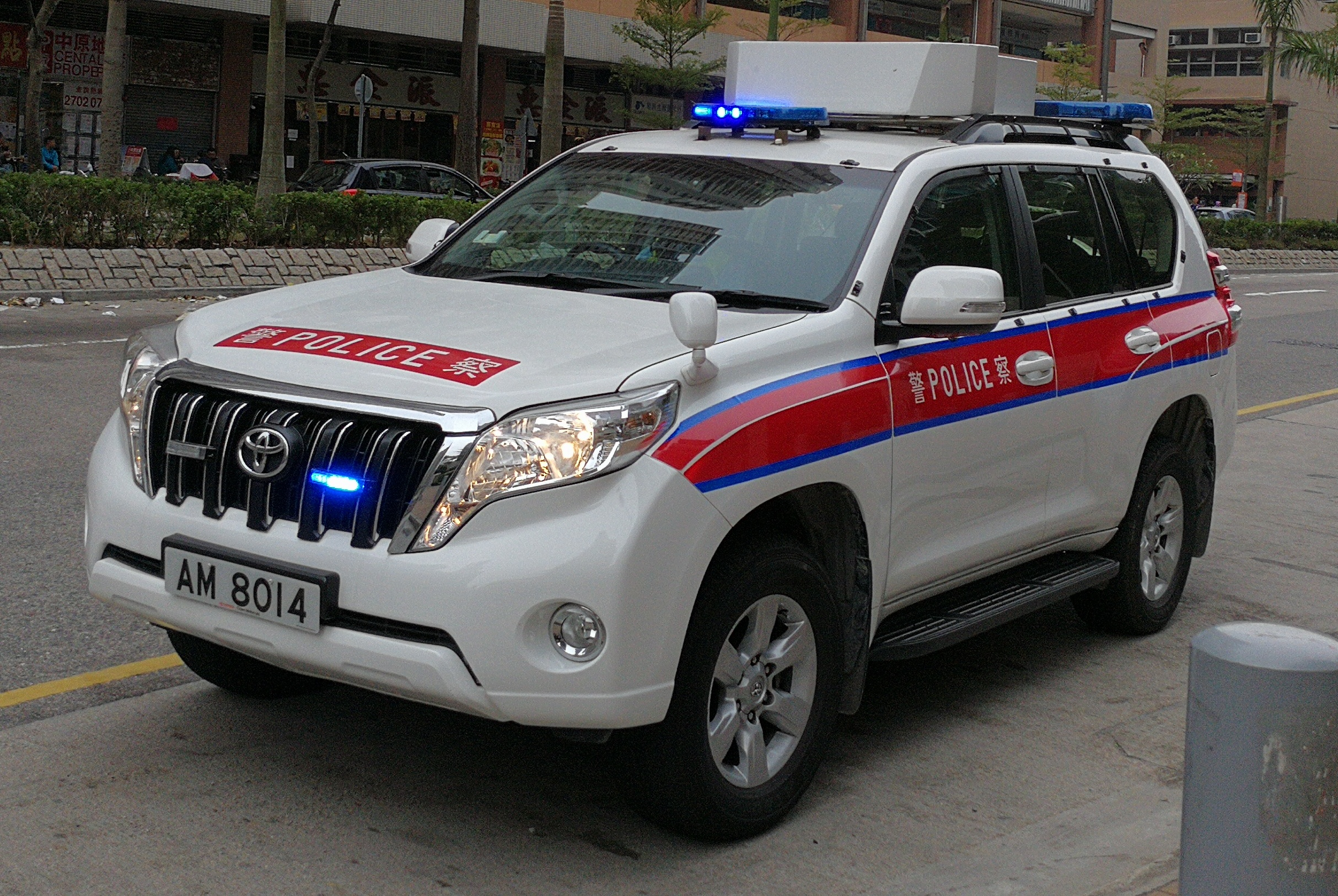
Toyota Land Cruiser Prado

=== Traffic branch vehicles ===
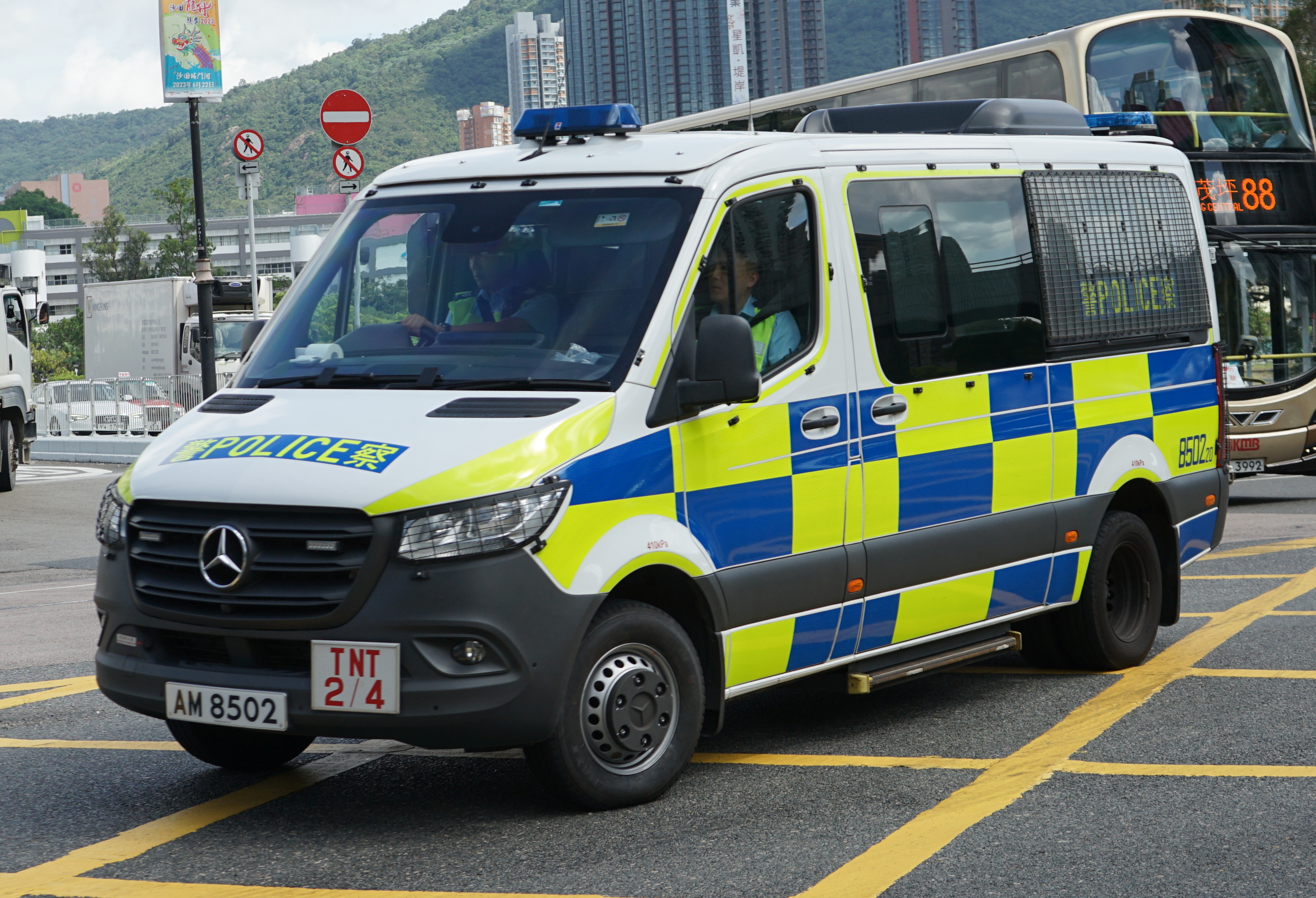
Traffic branch Mercedes-Benz Sprinter van.

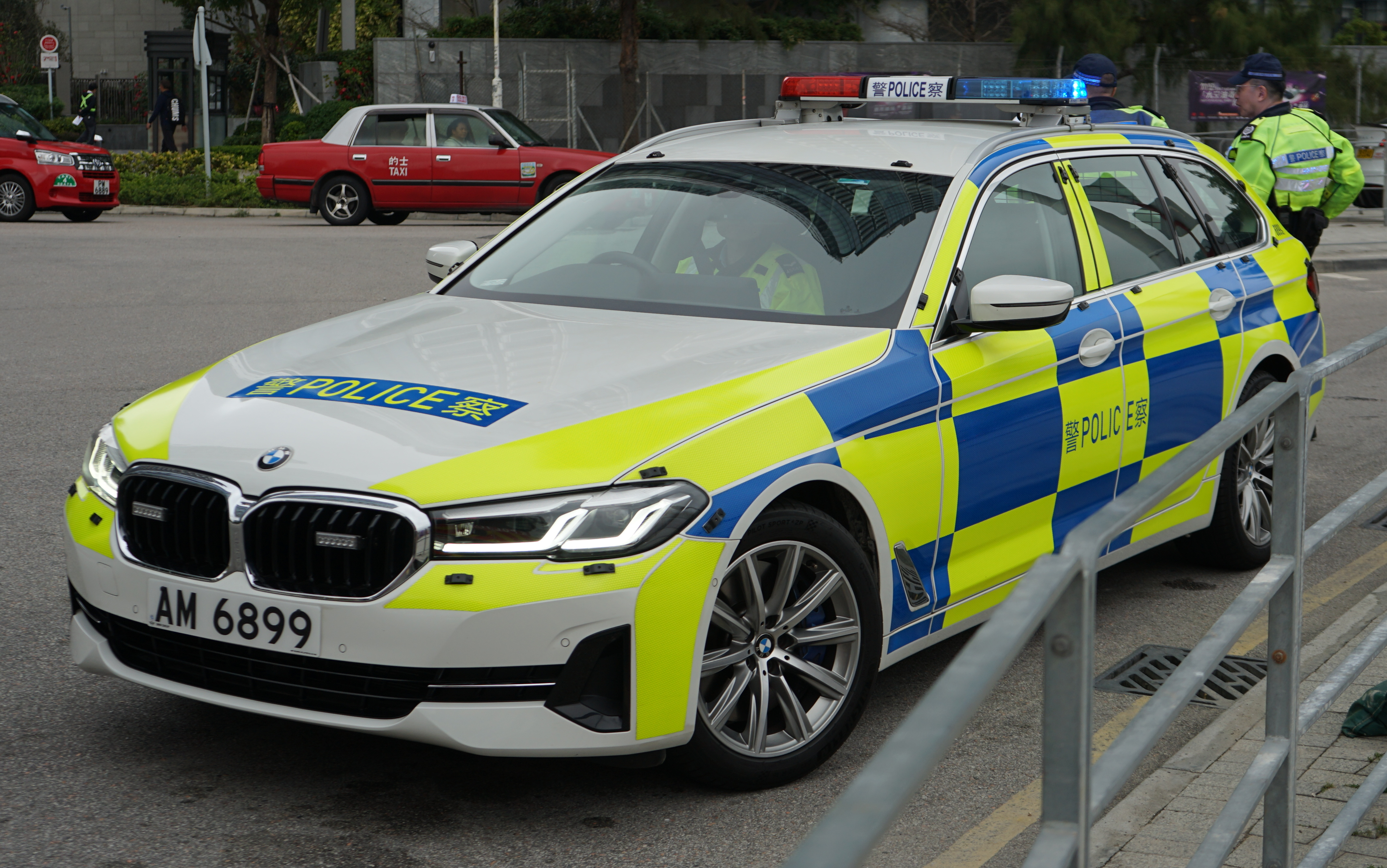
BMW 5 Series

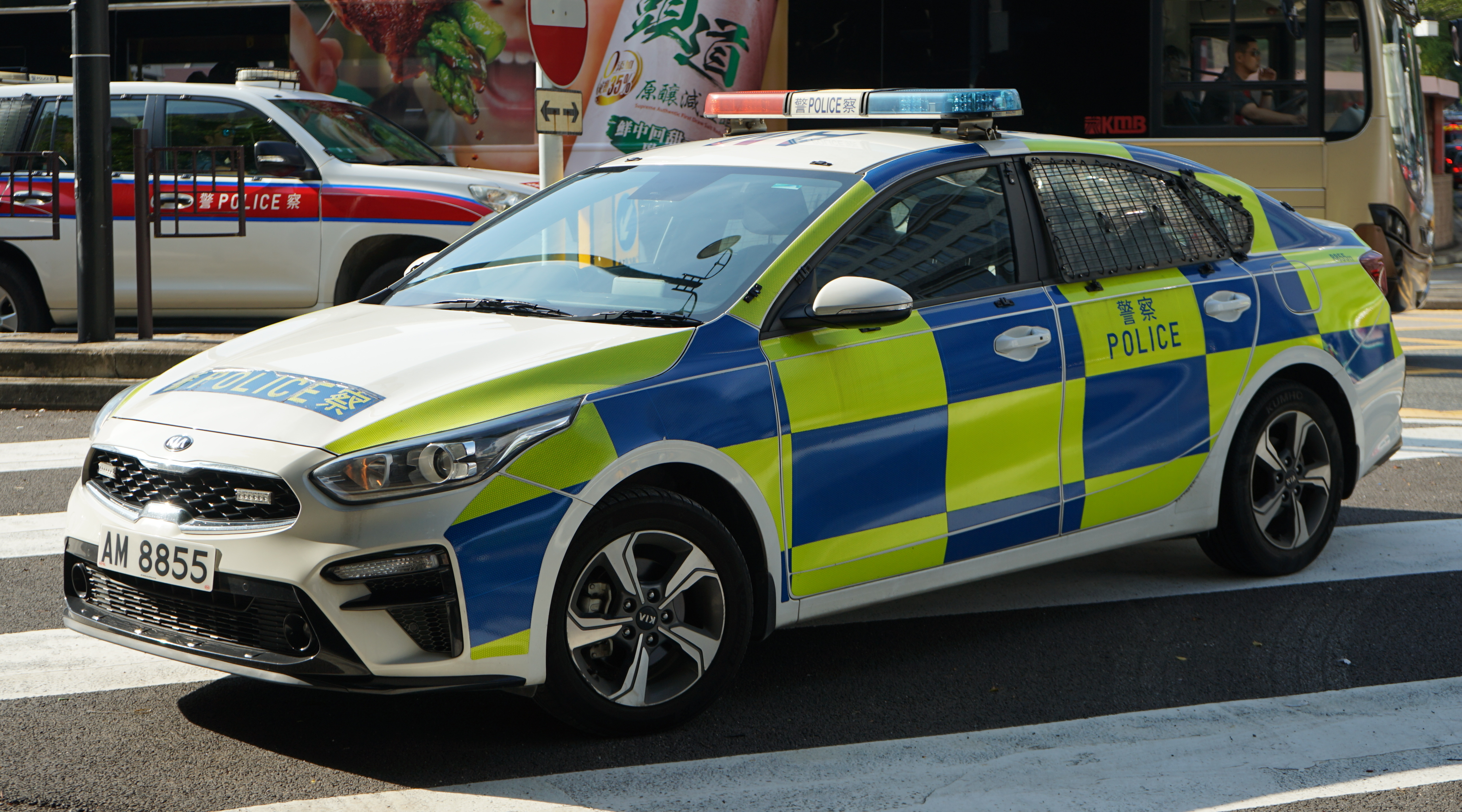
Kia Cerato

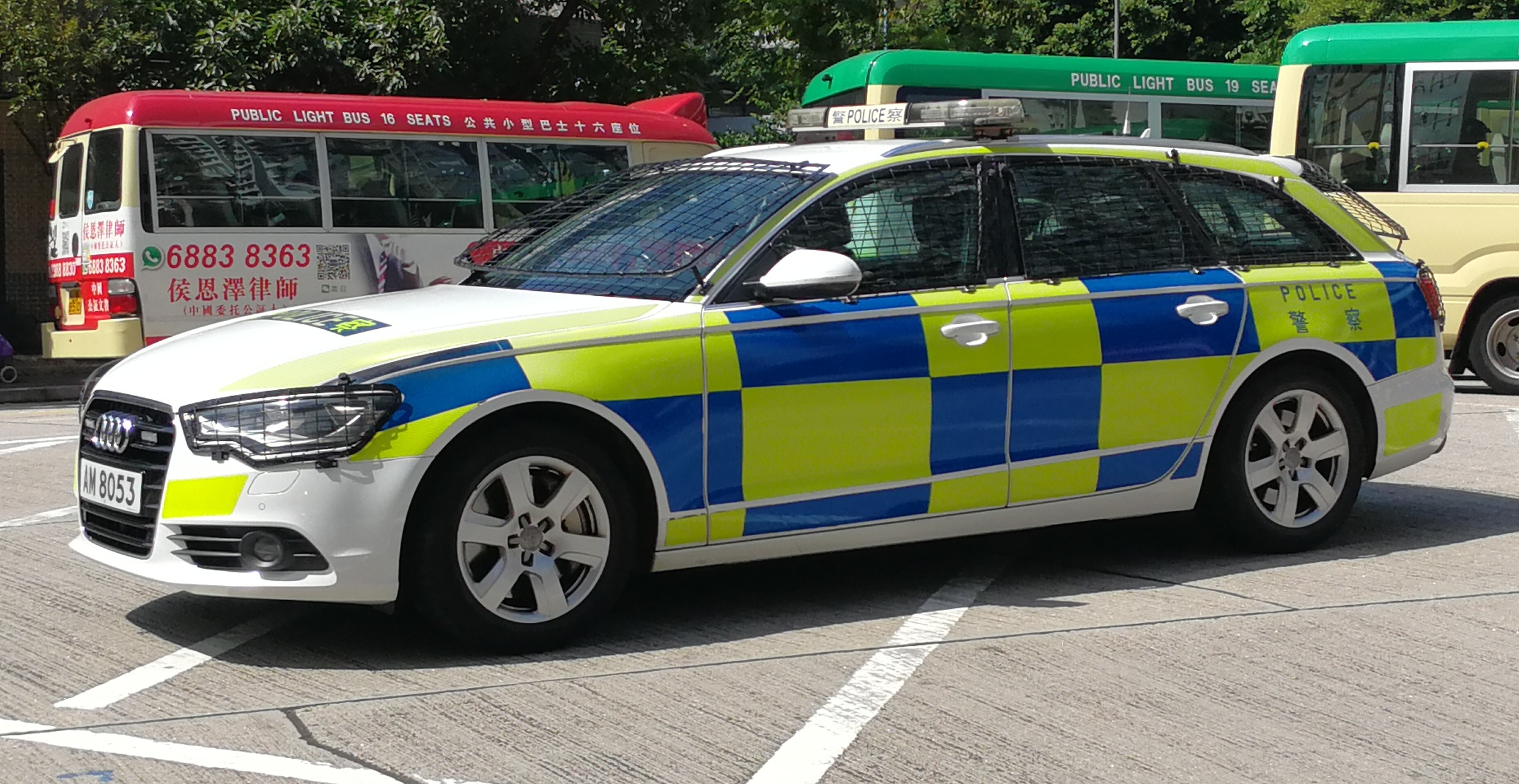
Audi A6

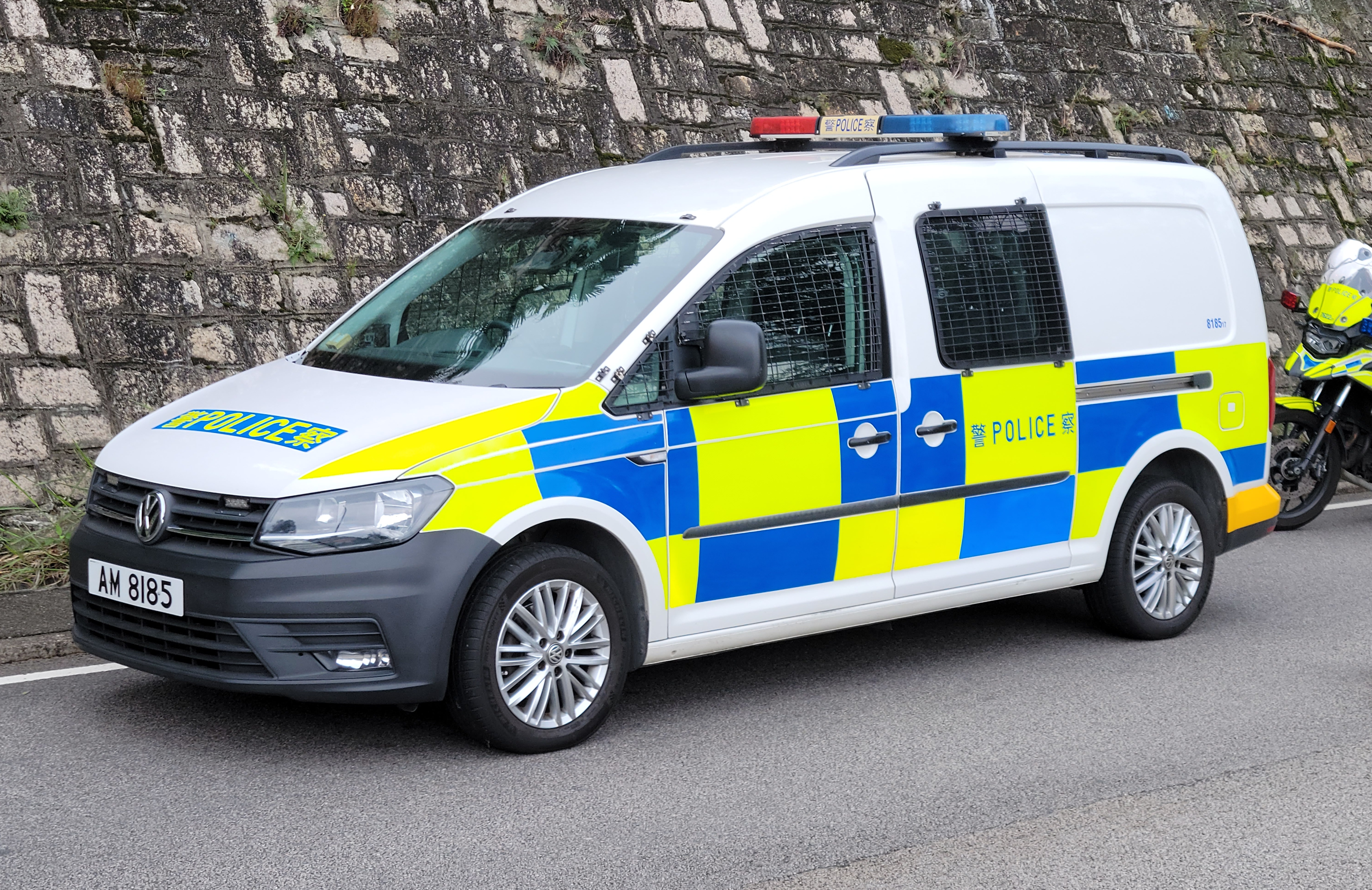
Volkswagen Caddy

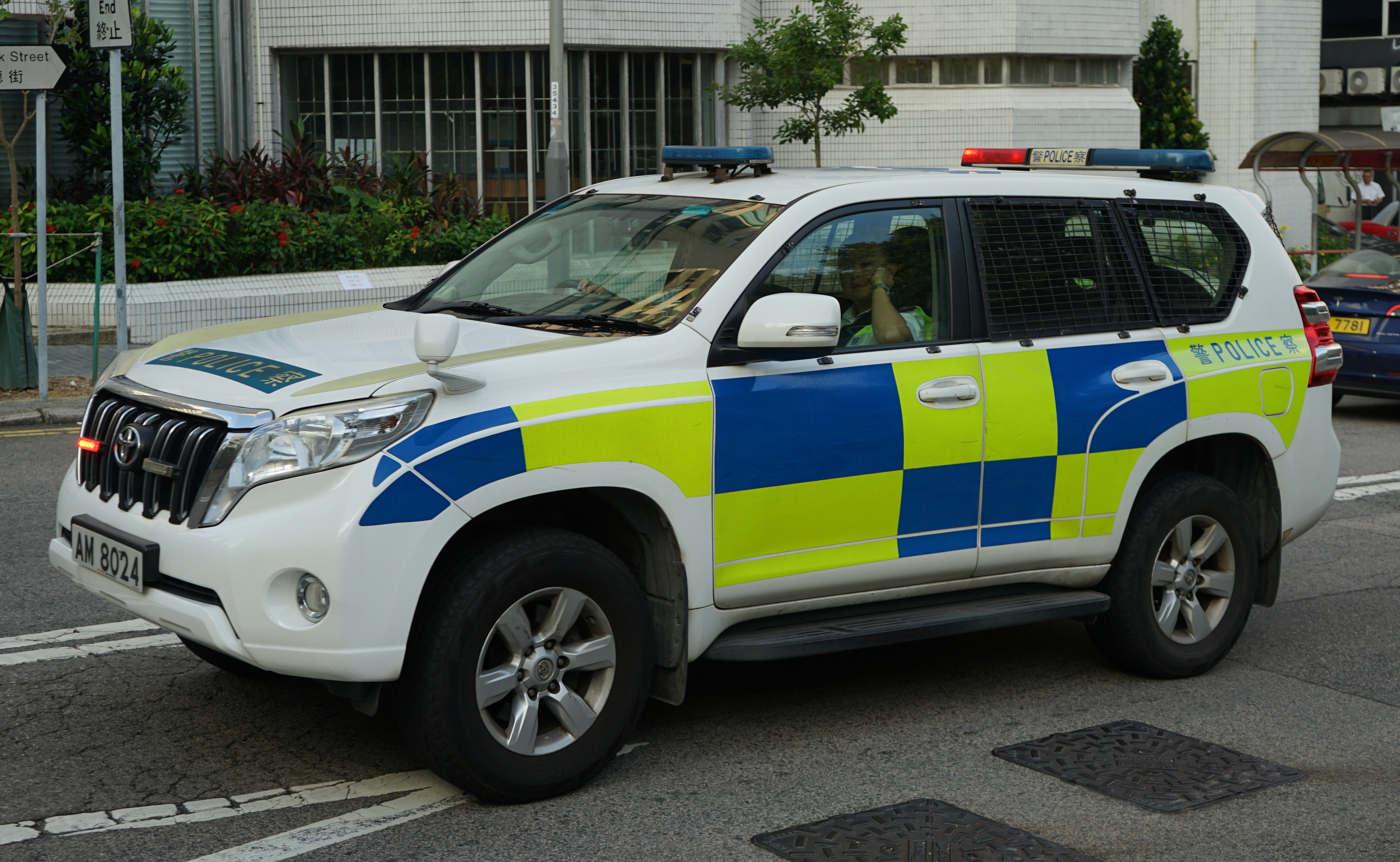
Toyota Land Cruiser Prado

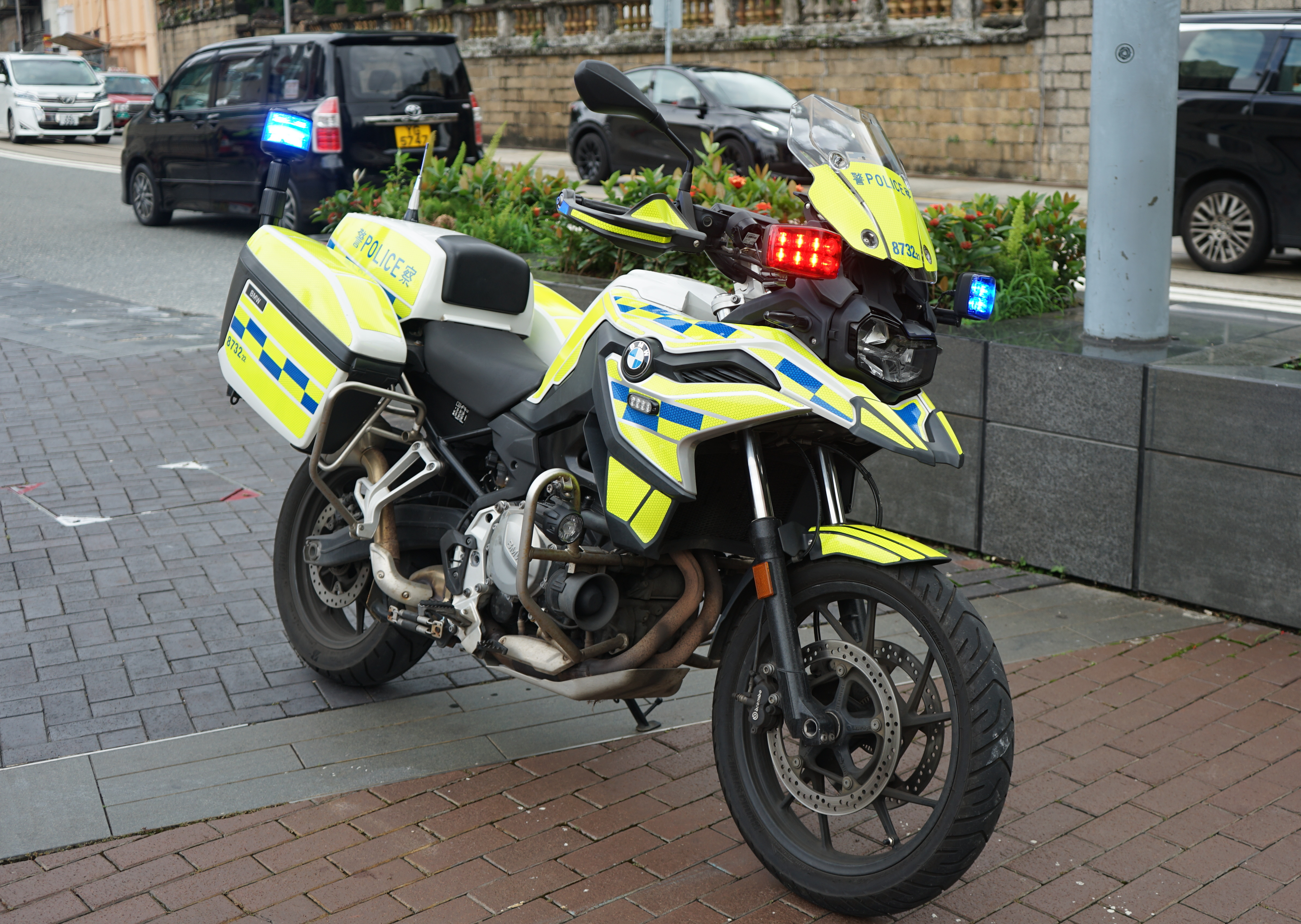
BMW R1250GS

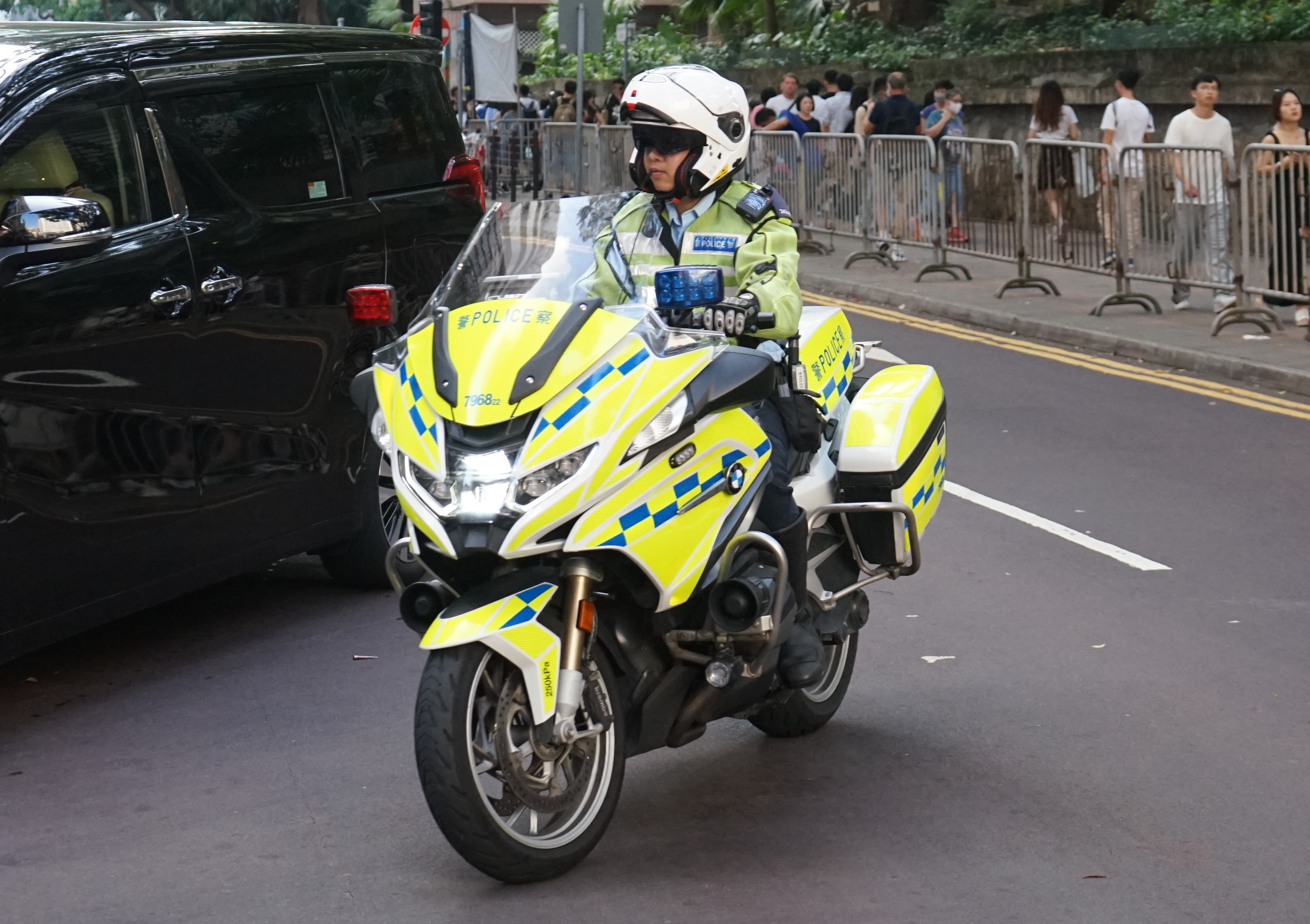
BMW R900RT

=== Armoured vehicles ===
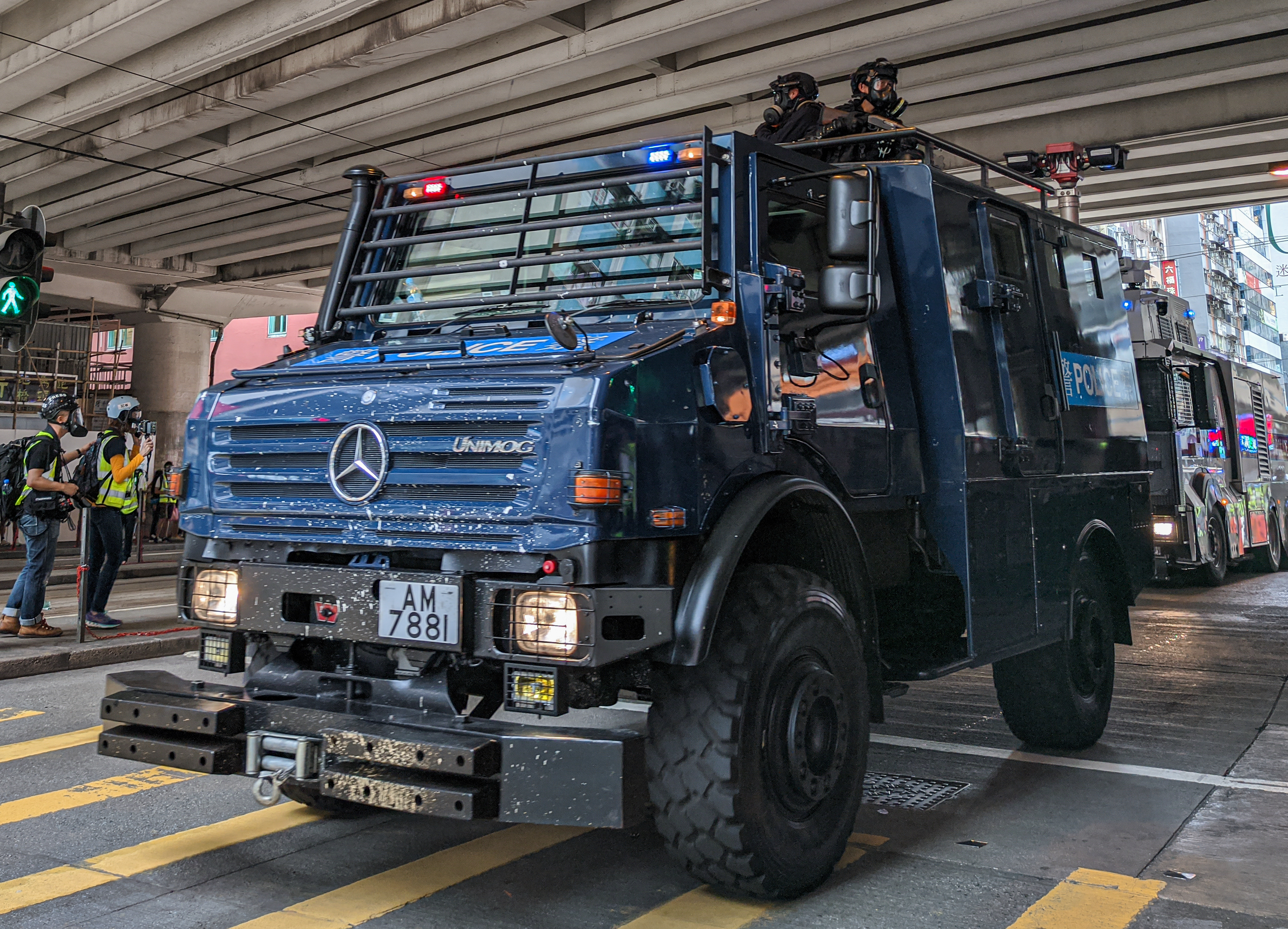
Unimog armoured riot vehicle.

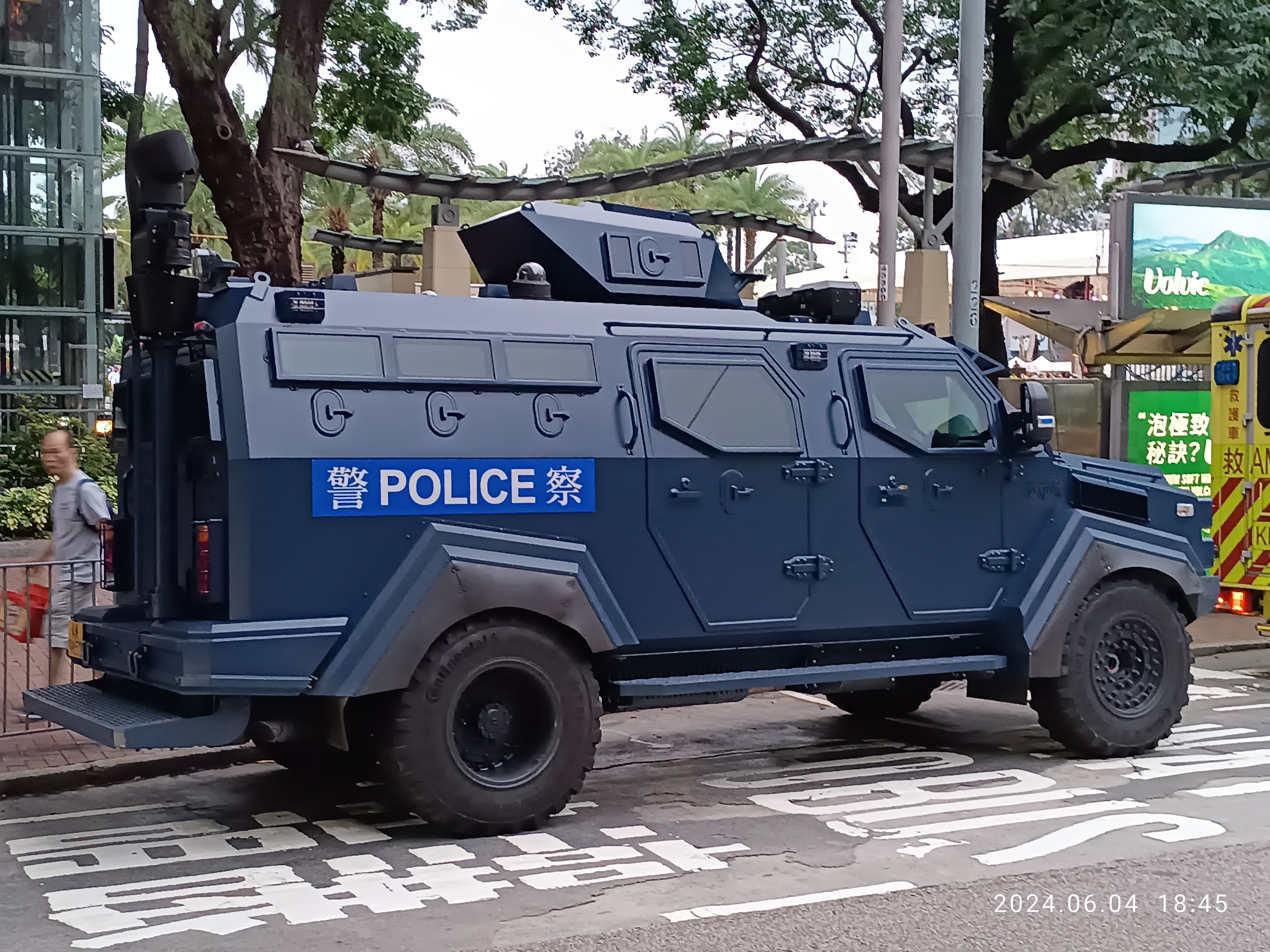
Sabertooth armoured riot vehicle

=== Personnel carriers ===
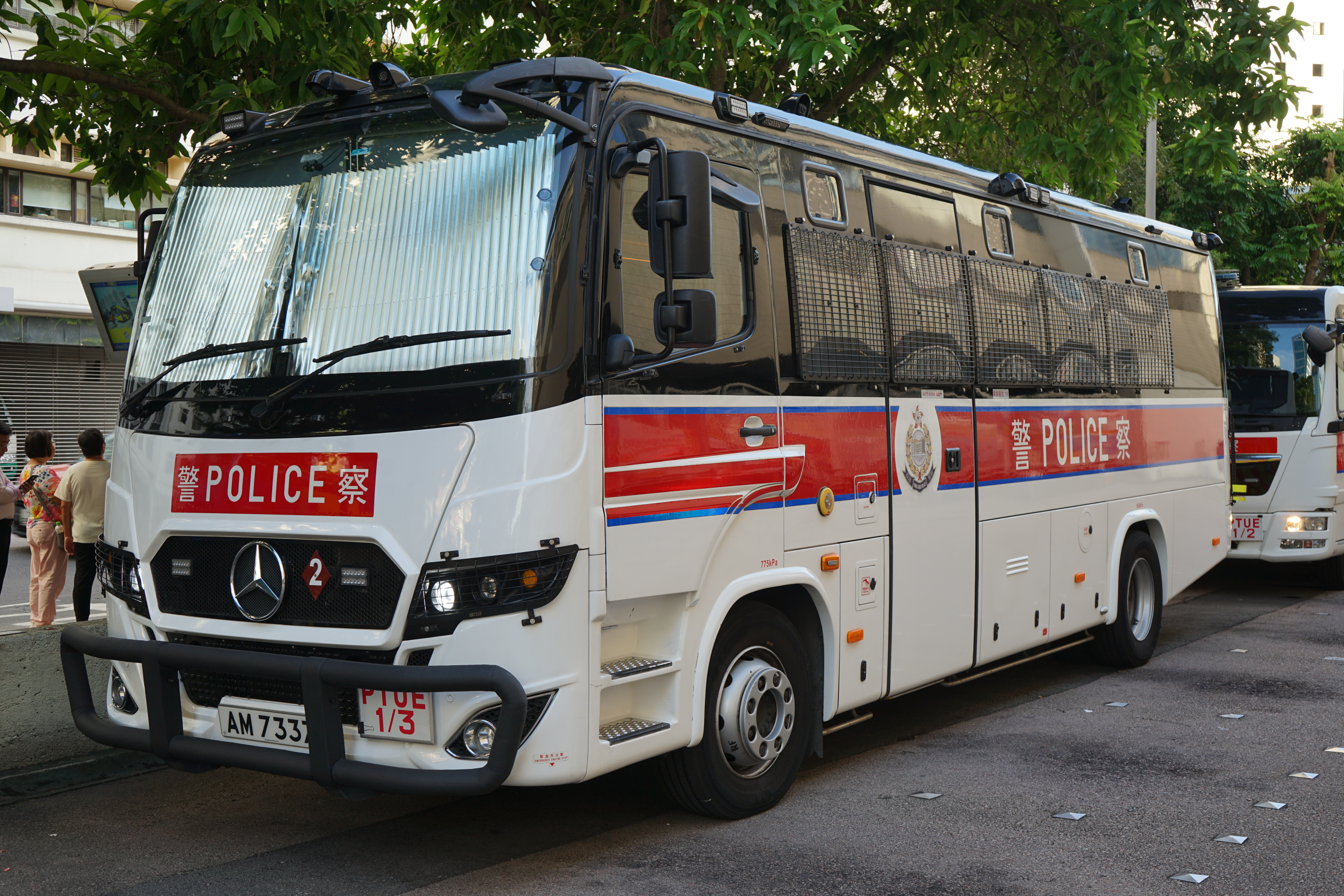
Mercedes-Benz Atego

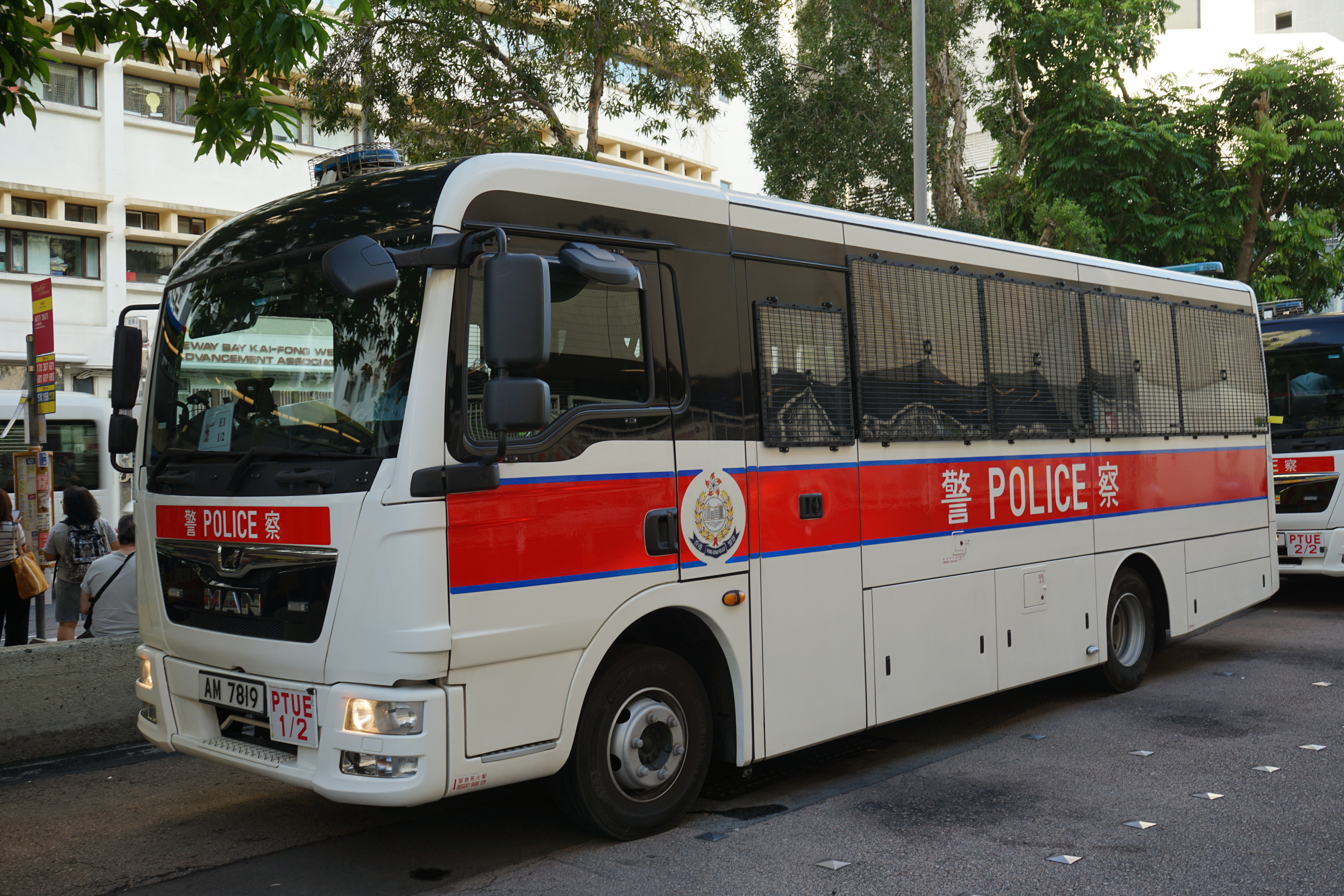
MAN TGM

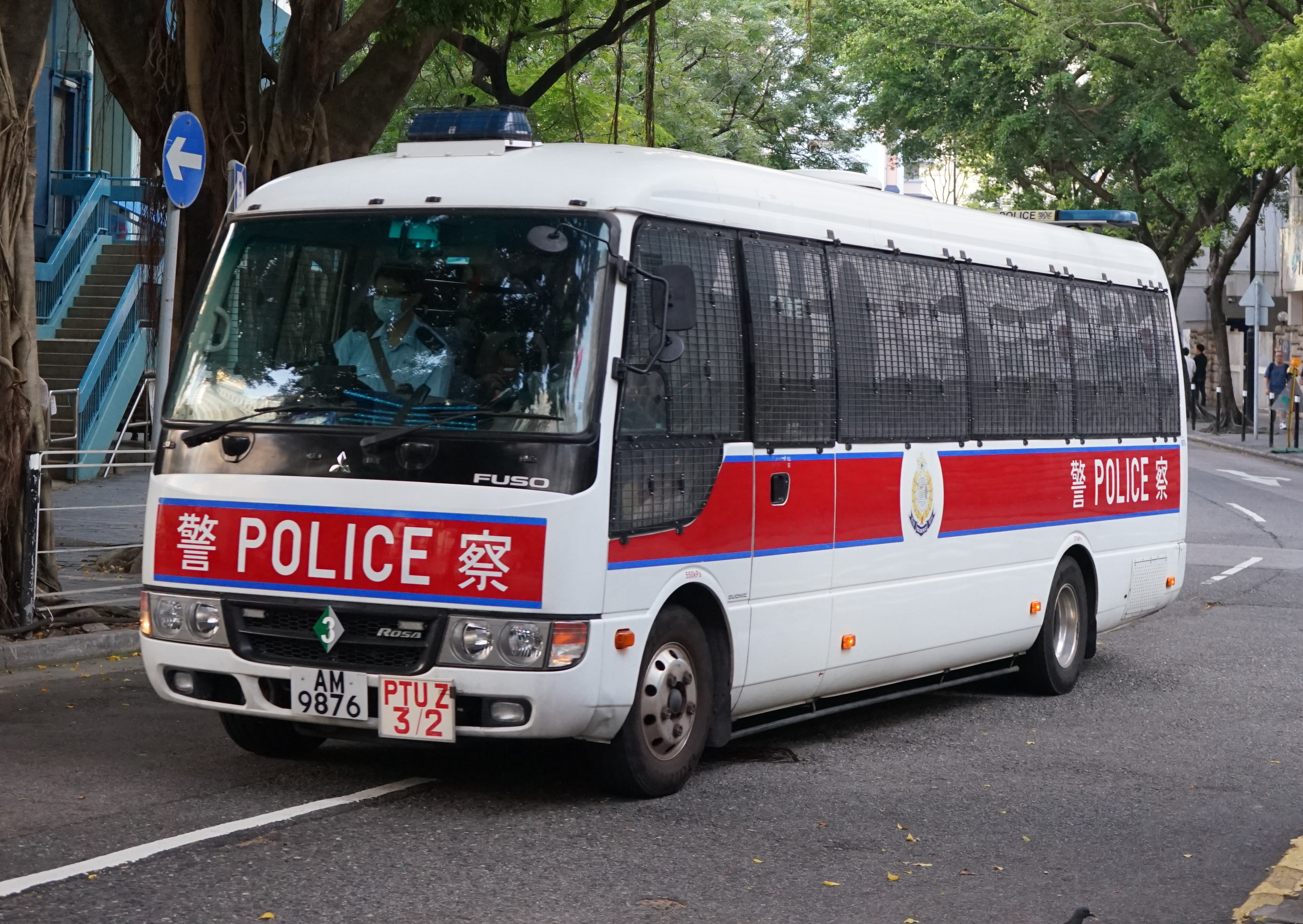
Mitsubishi Fuso Rosa

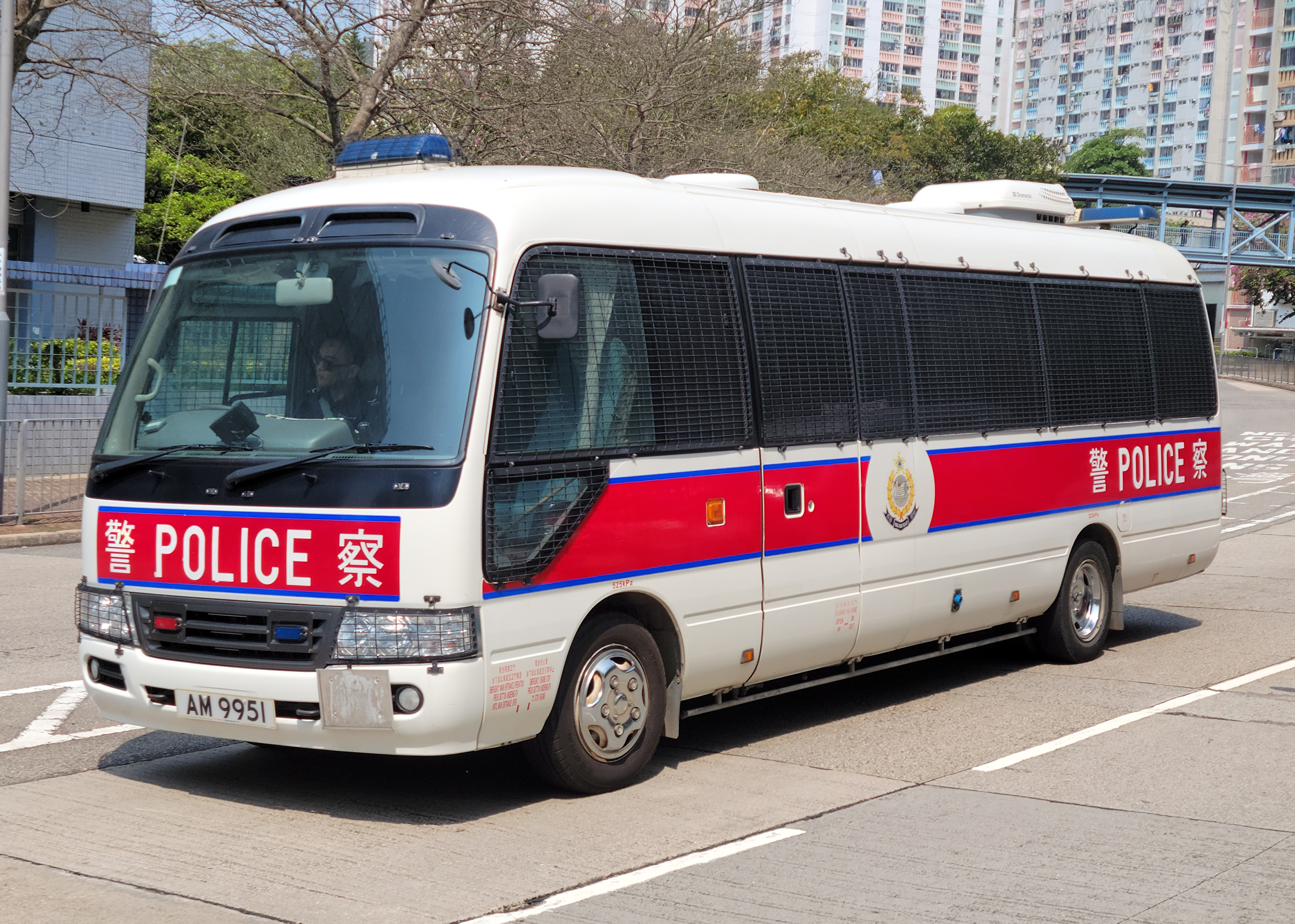
Toyota Coaster

== Retired vehicles ==
Following the Second World War, Hong Kong Police vehicles, with exception of motorcycles were generally painted in "battleship" grey. The livery changed to dark 'navy' blue following the Queen's bestowment of the "Royal"title to the force in recognition of their services during the 1967 Communist disturbances. The Royal Hong Kong Police crest was also displayed on the vehicle. This livery remained standard until the 1990s when white and black/navy blue; black/navy blue with a white roof or white with a red stripe and blue pinstripes came into being.

This is a list of retired vehicles (incomplete):

- Alvis Saracen APC - tactical APC (all retired)
- Bedford TJ (all retired)
- Mitsubishi Galant - car (all retired)
- Mitsubishi Lancer - car (all retired)
- BMW R850RT-P - motorbike (all retired and replaced by BMW R900RT-P)
- Ford Cortina - car (all retired)
- Ford Transit Mk.II - van (all retired)
- Ford Falcon - car (all retired)
- Ford Granada - car (all retired)
- Ford Transit - patrol van (all retired)
- Mazda Familia - car (all Retired)
- Mazda Capella - car (all Retired)
- Mazda 626 and 323 - car (all retired)
- Mazda 929 - car (all retired)
- Mazda Bongo E2000 - van (all retired)
- Morris Mini - car (all retired)
- Ford Telstar - car (all retired)
- Honda CBX650P - motorbike (all retired)
- Honda CB750P - motorbike (all retired)
- Isuzu NPR - lorry (all retired)
- Isuzu FTR - lorry (all retired)
- Land Rover Series III - patrol SUV (all retired)
- Mercedes-Benz T1 207D/310D (all retired)
- Mitsubishi Fuso Bus (BM chassis) - bus (all retired)
- Toyota Camry (XV10) - unmarked (all retired)
- Toyota Dyna - lorry (all retired)
- Leyland DAF – van (all retired)
- Yamaha XS 650P - motorbike (all retired)
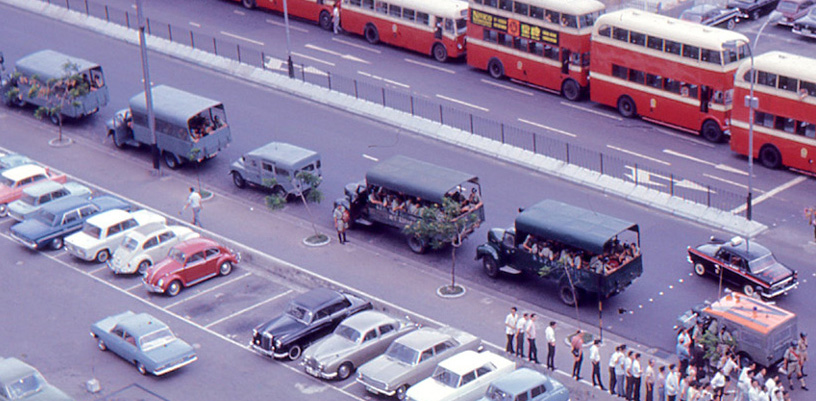
Grey police vehicles during the Hong Kong 1967 leftist riots.

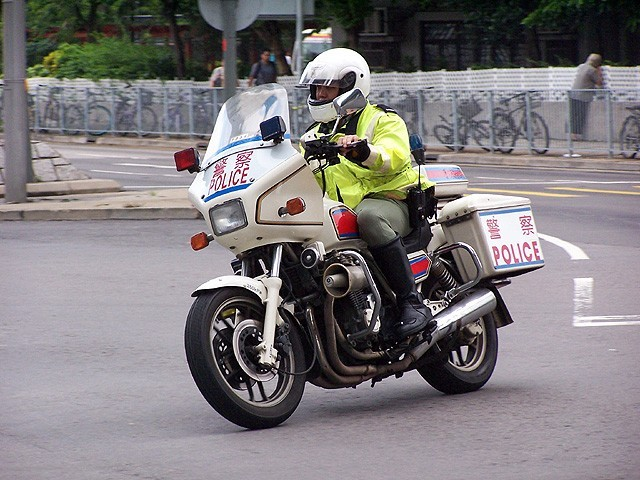
A retired Honda CB750P police motorcycle.

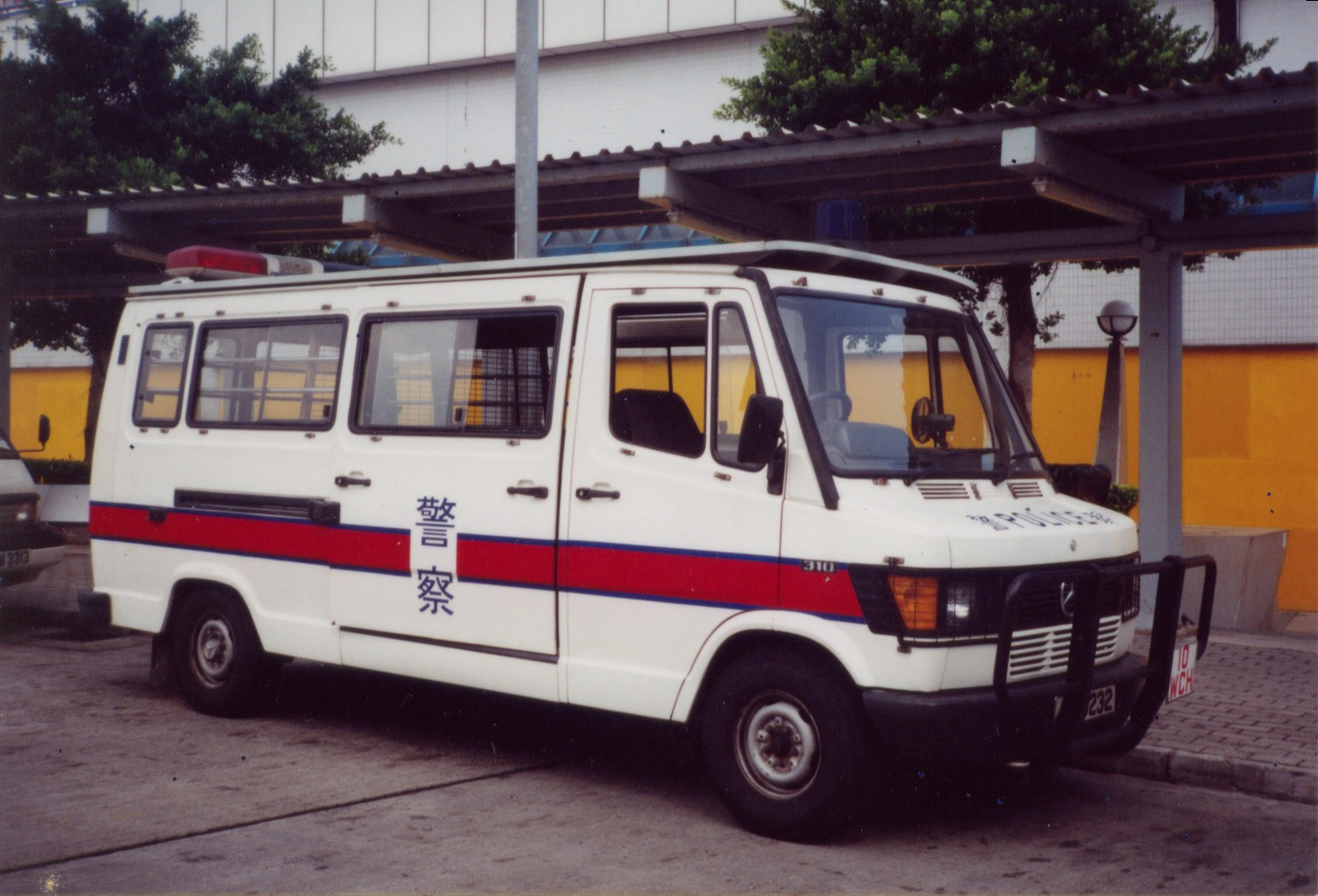
A retired Mercedes-Benz T1 Patrol Van.

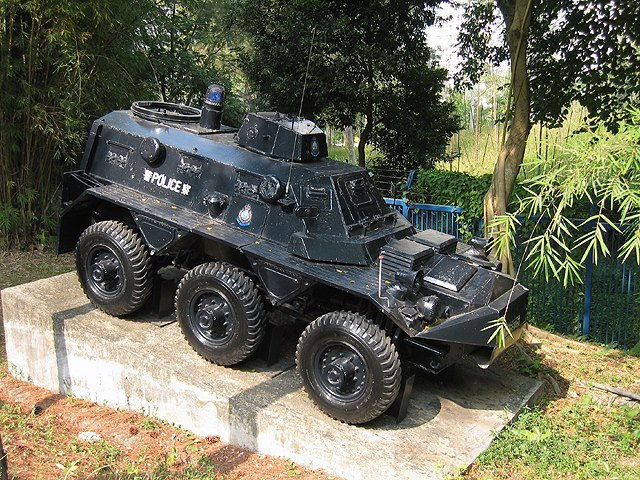
Police Tactical Unit specialised first generation of armoured personnel carrier, Saracen. Now parked at the Police Tactical Unit Base's gates for exhibition.

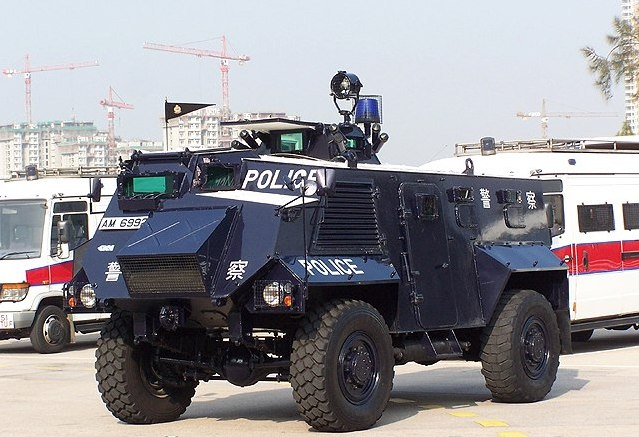
Police Tactical Unit specialised second generation of armoured personnel carrier, Saxon. Now parked inside the Police Tactical Unit Base for exhibition.

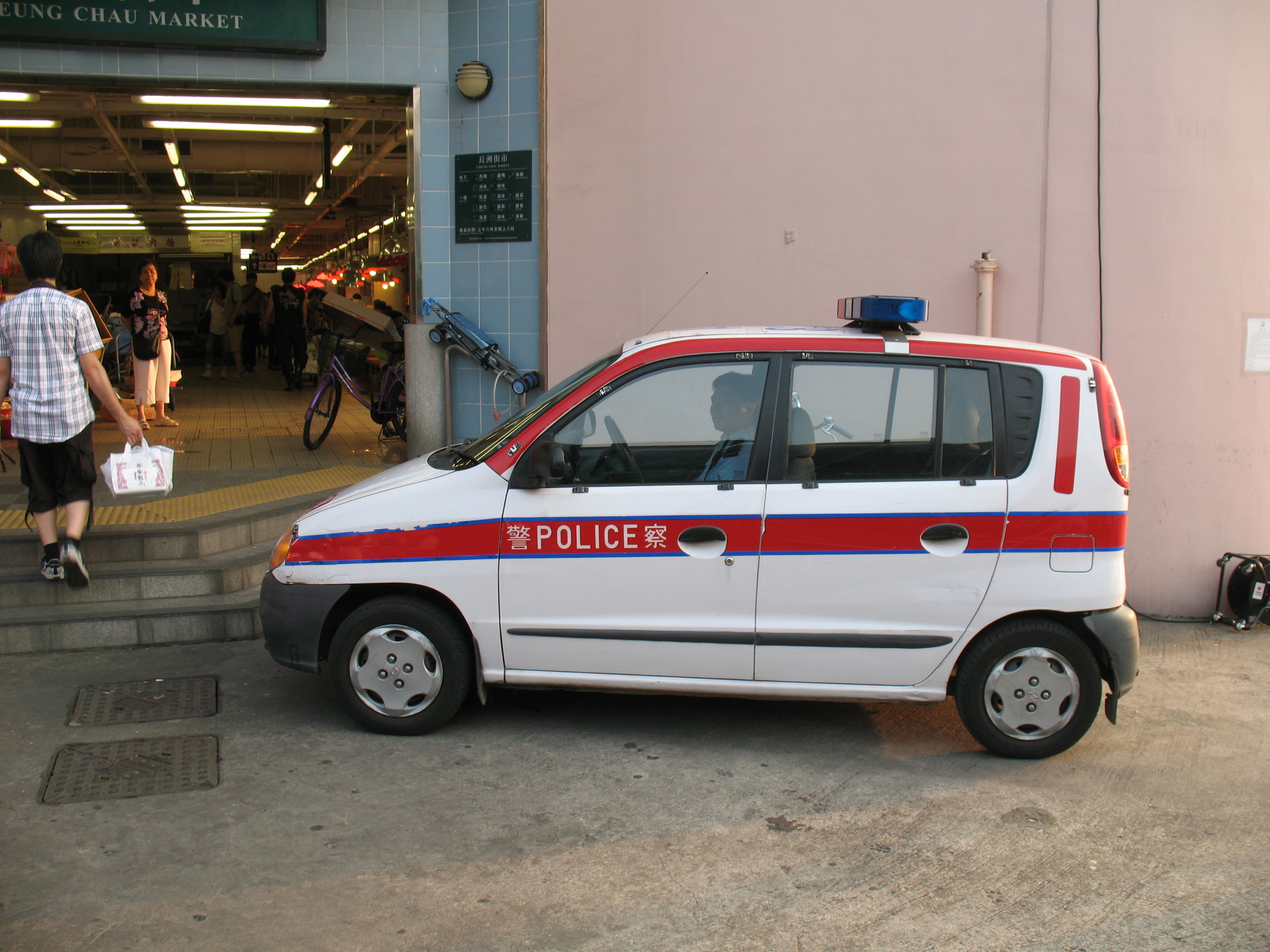
A small police car (Hyundai Atos) specially designed for islands and the Victoria Peak.

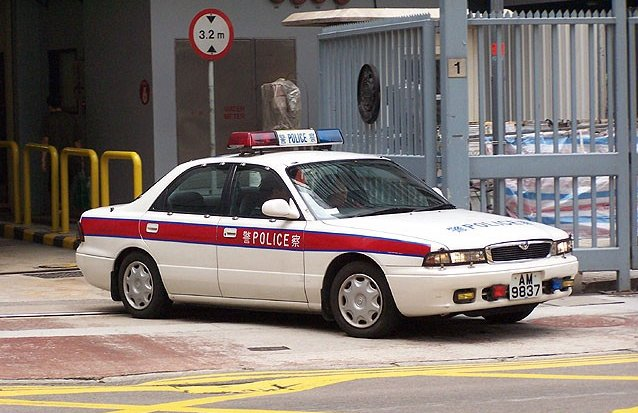
A vehicle specially for senior officers.

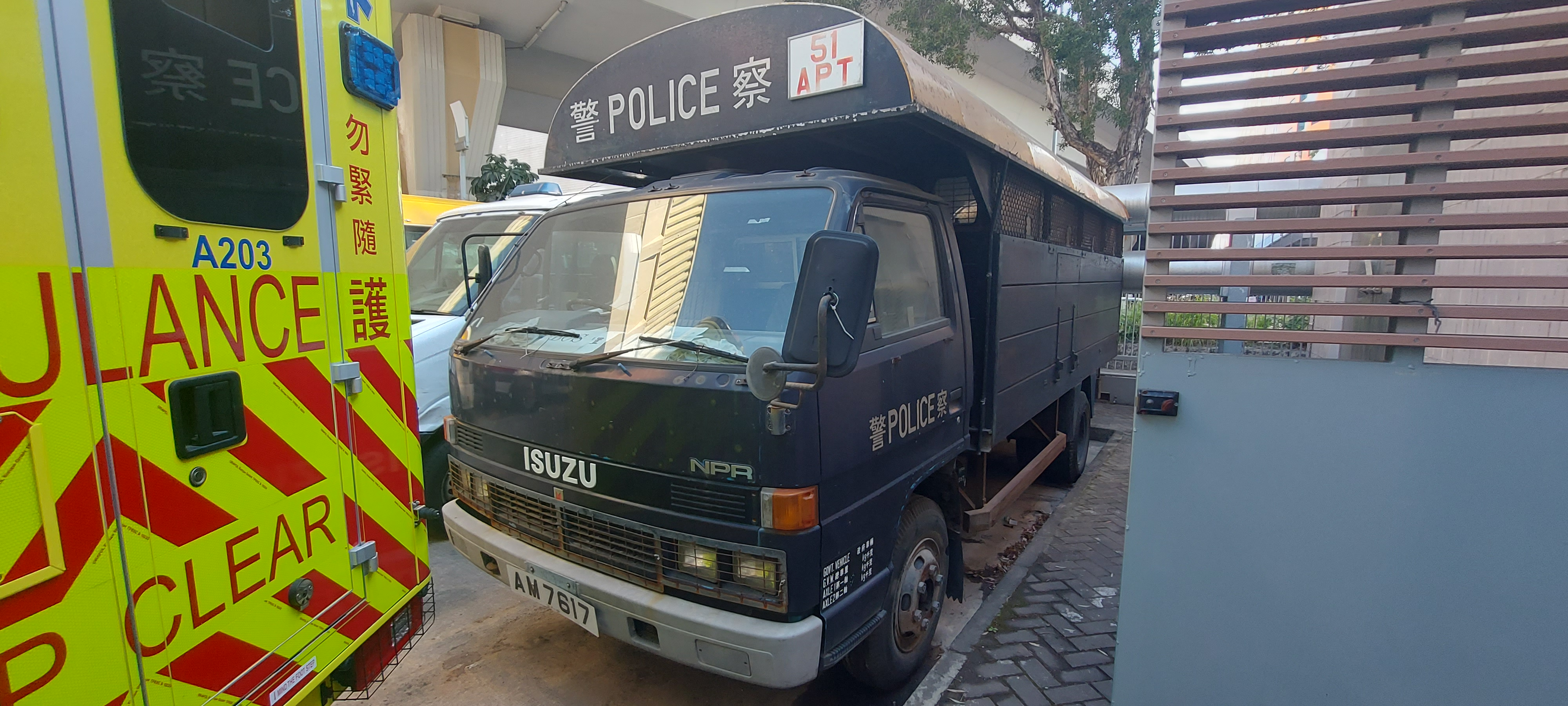
The one and only Isuzu NPR police lorry which is kept at Electrical and Mechanical Services Department headquarters.
