= BMW R1150RT =

Touring motorcycle

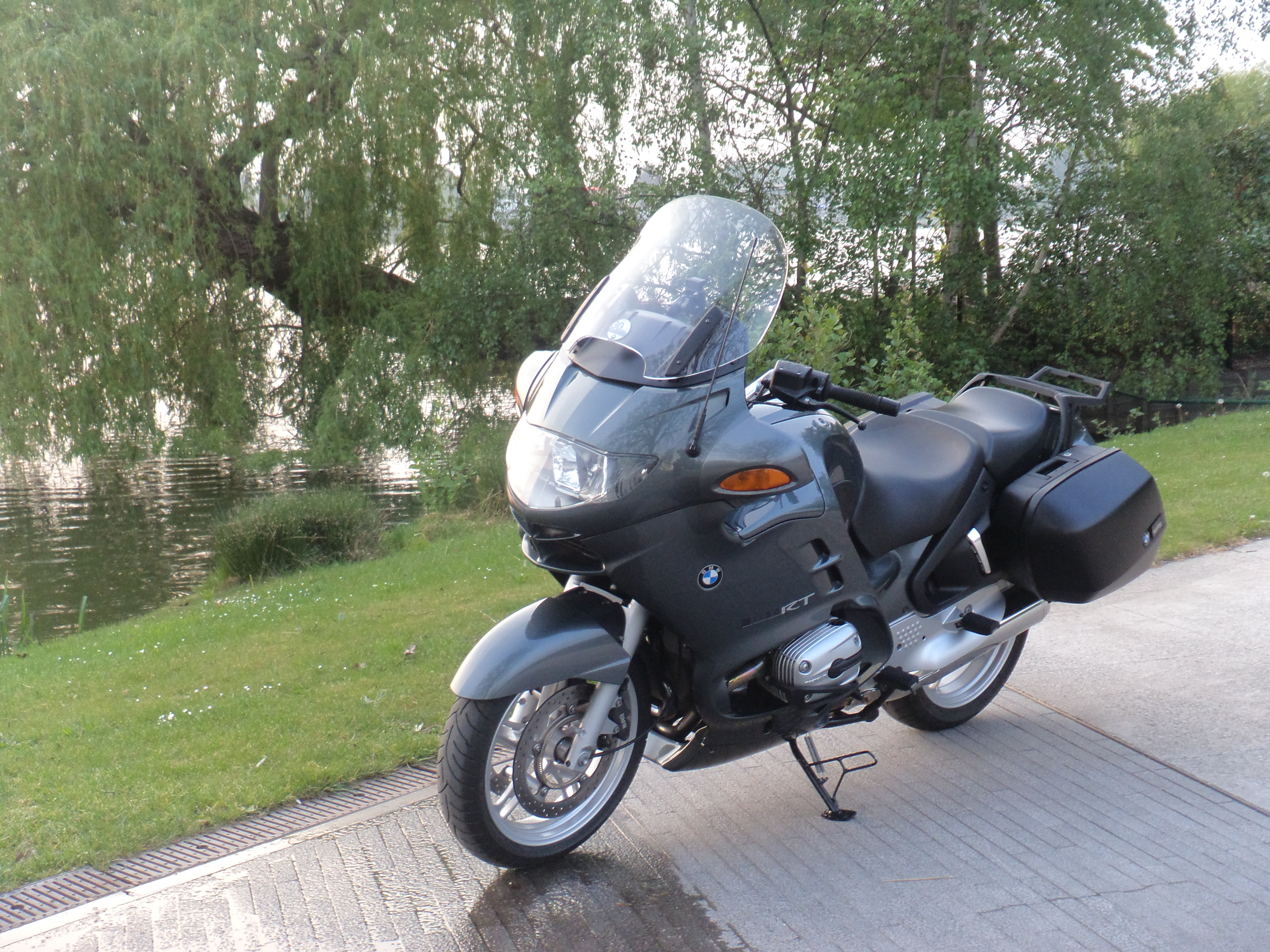
- Manufacturer: BMW Motorrad
- Parent company: BMW
- Production: 2001–2005
- Predecessor: R1100RT
- Successor: R1200RT
- Class: Tourer
- Engine: 1,130 cc (69 cu in) Two-cylinder Four-stroke boxer engine, 4 valves per cylinder
- Bore / stroke: 101 mm × 70.5 mm (3.98 in × 2.78 in)
- Compression ratio: 10.3:1
- Top speed: 205 km/h (127 mph)
- Power: 70 kW (94 hp) at 7250 rpm
- Torque: 98 N⋅m (72 lbf⋅ft) at 5500 rpm
- Ignition type: Bosch Motronic MA 2.2 Electronic ignition
- Fuel delivery: Bosch Motronic MA 2.4 Fuel injection
- Transmission: 6-speed sequential manual transmission, shaft-drive
- Frame type: Load-bearing unit construction engine & gearbox, with front & rear subframes
- Suspension: Front: Telelever with central spring strut and linear-rate coil spring, twin-tube gas-filled shock Rear: Paralever swingarm, single tube gas-filled shock with variable rebound
- Brakes: Front: Two four-piston fixed callipers with dual floating disc brake of 320 mm (12.6 in); Rear: Two-piston calliper fixed disc of 276 mm (10.9 in); ABS
- Tires: Front: 120/70 ZR17 tubeless steel-belted radial Rear: 170/16 ZR17 tubeless steel-belted radial
- Wheelbase: 1,487 mm (58.5 in)
- Dimensions: L: 2,170 mm (85 in); W: 940 mm (37 in); H: 1,220 mm (48 in)
- Seat height: 845 mm (33.3 in)
- Weight: 255.1 kg (562 lb) (dry); 279 kg (615 lb) (wet)
- Fuel capacity: 25.2 L (5.5 imp gal; 6.7 US gal)
- Fuel consumption: 5.3 L/100 km (53 mpg_{‑imp}; 44 mpg_{‑US})
- Related: R850RT

The BMW R1150RT is a touring or sport touring motorcycle that was manufactured from 2001 to 2005 by BMW Motorrad to replace the R1100RT model. It featured a 1,130 cc (69 cu in) flat-twin engine with a six-speed gearbox and shaft drive.

It was an evolution of the R1100RT, featuring an air and oil-cooled (or "oilhead") engine. The R1150RT was based on the same basic platform with increased engine capacity and horsepower, fully linked power-assisted ABS brakes, revised front lighting system, and a six-speed gearbox. This model was further updated in 2004 by the adoption of dual ignition, with two spark plugs per cylinder.

Cycle World's 2001 review focused heavily on the new ABS system, pointing out that it was both effective but also quite intrusive, especially to riders that were used to trail-braking with the rear brake. Overall their view of the bike was positive. Motorcycle News' 2014 review was much more positive about the brakes, rating them as excellent.

== R1150RT-P ==
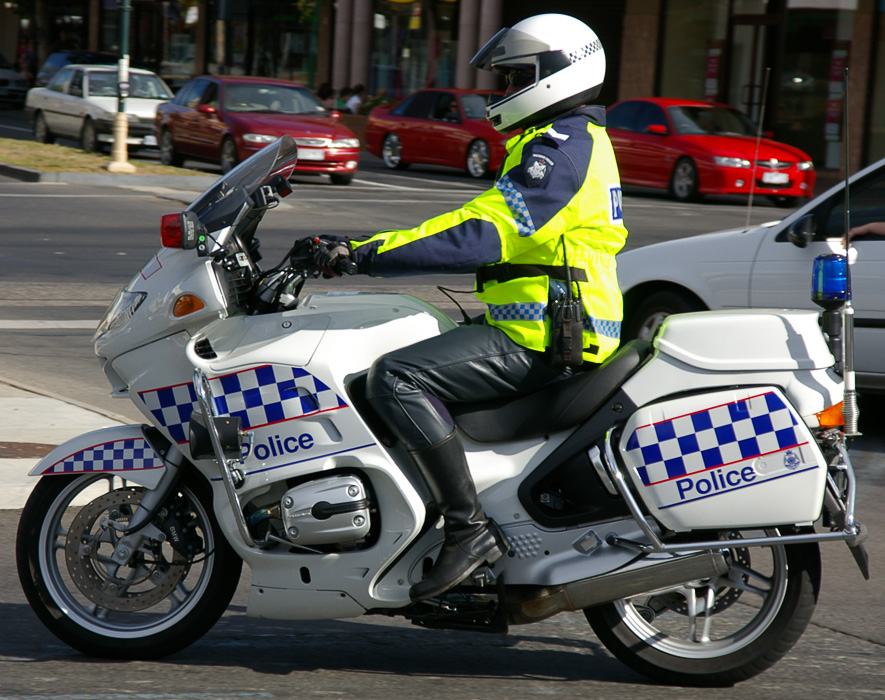
Victoria Police BMW R1150RT-P motorcycle in Bendigo, Victoria.

An authorities model, the R1150RT-P, was also available, and featured a single seat, dual batteries, lights and sirens, crash bars, and a radio top box. The ABS was modified to allow for linked braking only from the front brake, so that the rear brake could be used for trail braking.
