= BMW R1200RT =

- Manufacturer: BMW Motorrad
- Production: 2005-2019
- Predecessor: BMW R1150RT
- Successor: BMW R1250RT
- Class: Touring or sport touring
- Engine: 1,170 cc (71 cu in) 8-valve flat twin
- Bore / stroke: 101 mm × 73 mm (4.0 in × 2.9 in)
- Compression ratio: 12.0:1
- Power: 81 kW (109 hp) @ 7,750 rpm
- Torque: 120 N⋅m (89 lbf⋅ft) @ 6,000 rpm
- Transmission: 6-speed sequential manual transmission, shaft-drive
- Frame type: Load-bearing unit construction engine & gearbox, with front & rear subframes
- Suspension: Front: Telelever; Rear: Paralever
- Brakes: Integral ABS (part-integral); Front: 4-piston calipers with floating 320 mm discs Rear: 2-piston floating caliper with single 265 mm disc
- Tires: Front: 120/70ZR17 on 3.50 x 17 rim Rear: 180/55ZR17 on 5.50 x 17 rim Cast aluminium wheels
- Rake, trail: 26.4°, 116 mm (4.6 in)
- Wheelbase: 1,485 mm (58.5 in)
- Dimensions: L: 2,230 mm (88 in); W: 905 mm (35.6 in); H: 1,430 mm (56 in)
- Seat height: Adjustable 820 to 840 mm (32.3–33.1 in); Low seat option: 780 to 800 mm (30.7–31.5 in)
- Weight: 229 kg (505 lb) (dry); 259 kg (571 lb) w/o panniers (wet)
- Fuel capacity: 25 L (5.5 imp gal; 6.6 US gal)
- Fuel consumption: 41.6 mpg_{‑US} (5.65 L/100 km; 50.0 mpg_{‑imp})
- Related: R1200GS; R1200R; R1200ST

The BMW R1200RT is a touring or sport touring motorcycle that was manufactured from 2005 to 2019 by BMW Motorrad to replace the R1150RT model. It features a 1,170 cc (71 cu in) flat-twin engine with a six-speed gearbox and shaft drive.

== History ==
=== Previous RT models, 1978 to 2005 ===
BMW Motorrad began manufacturing RT (Reise-Tourer, or travel tourer) touring motorcycle models in the late 1970s. The first of these were air-cooled (or "airhead") models that continued BMW's long tradition dating to 1923 of producing "boxer" or opposed flat-twin engined motorcycles with unit engine-transmission construction and shaft-final-drive.

In 1995, BMW produced its first air and oil-cooled (or "oilhead") RT model, the R1100RT. The new machine included standard ABS brakes, four-valve heads, five-speed gearbox, Telelever front suspension, Paralever rear suspension, and an electrically adjustable screen.

In 2001, BMW launched the R1150RT, providing the same basic platform with increased engine capacity and horsepower, fully linked power-assisted ABS brakes, revised front lighting system, and a six-speed gearbox. This model was further updated in 2004 by the adoption of dual ignition, with two spark plugs per cylinder.

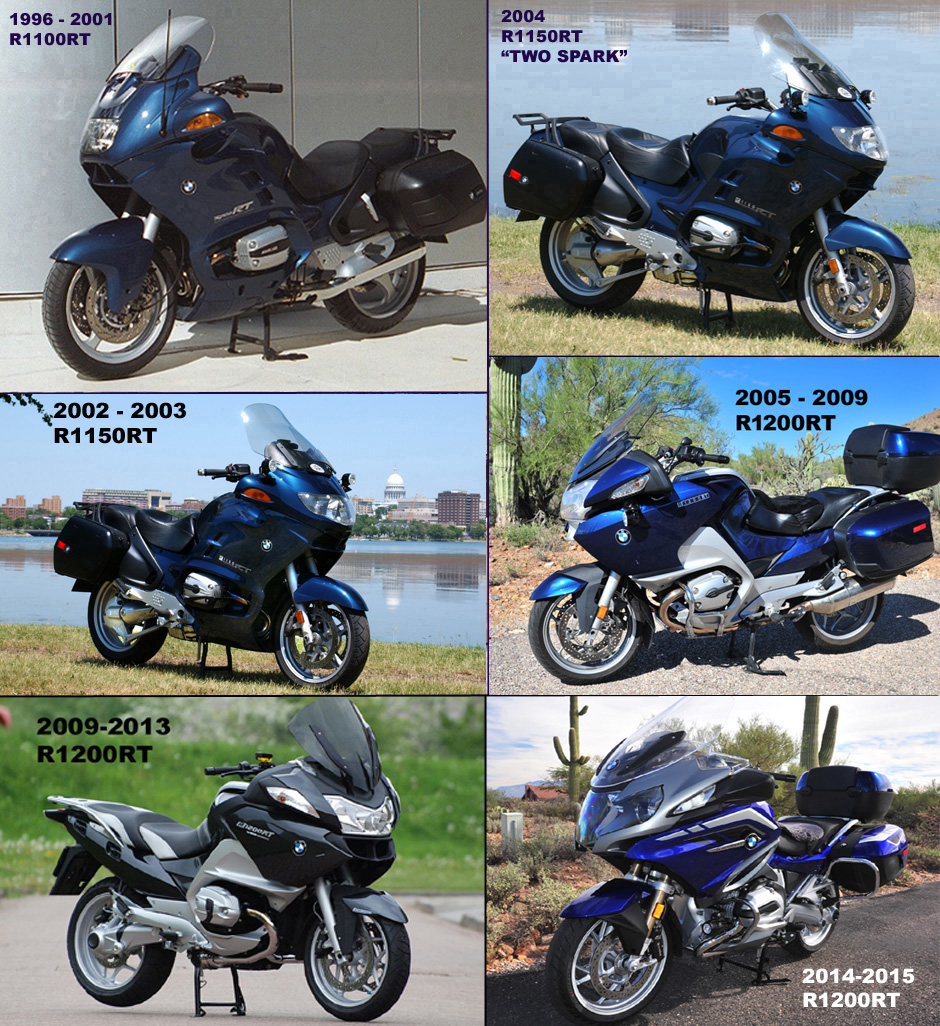
Six generations of RT motorcycles from 1996 to the present

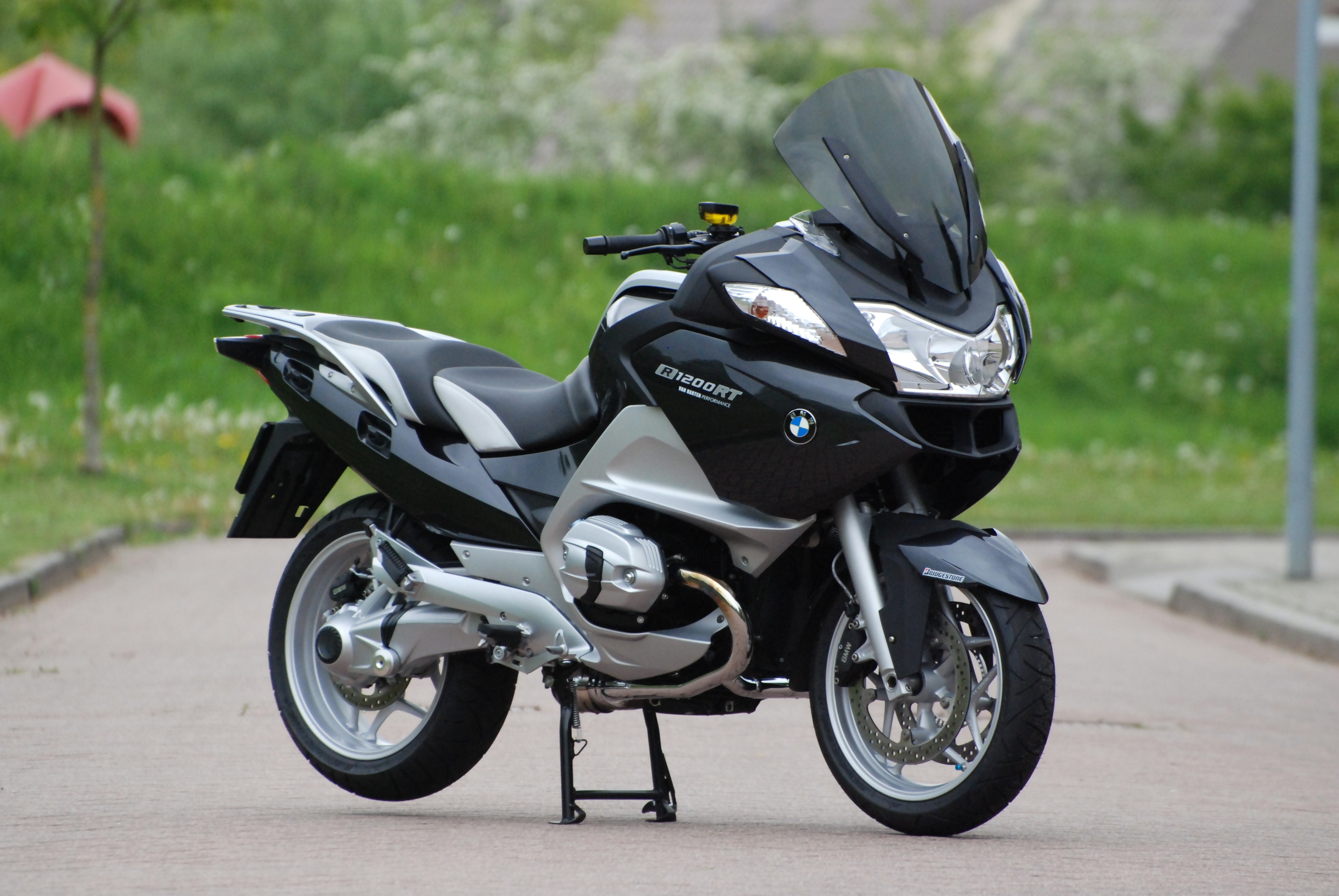
2010 R1200RT with double overhead cams

=== 2005 to 2013 ===
In 2005, BMW introduced the R1200RT. The design of this model was completely different from the R1150RT with a 15% boost in power, 20 kg (44 lb) weight saving, optional electronic suspension adjustment (ESA) and on-board computer. A low seat and/or a lowered suspension were available for shorter riders reducing seat height to a lowest level of 820 mm (32.3 in), although the lowered suspension eliminates the ESA option. The standard electrically operated windscreen was adjustable across a range of heights.

The servo powered ABS brakes on the 2005 and 2006 models were partially integrated such that the rear brake pedal only applies the rear brake while the front brake lever applies both brakes. For the 2007 model year, servo assist was removed from the partially integrated brakes. A new, more advanced and lighter ABS system was produced by Continental Teves, which also produced the optional Automatic Stability Control (ASC), in BMW's traction control system for motorcycles.

An electronic tire pressure monitor (TPM) was introduced as an option. During the production of the 2006 models, the original two-tone horns were replaced by a single-tone horn. Other optional equipment included cruise control, heated grips, heated seats for both the rider and passenger and a CD/Radio audio system.

With 110 hp (82 kW) and 85 lbf⋅ft (115 N⋅m) of torque, the R1200RT is suitable for long-distance touring carrying a rider and passenger and a full load of luggage; and is able to reach 135 mph (217 km/h) and do a standing quarter mile in 12.2 seconds.

In November 2009, BMW announced some revisions to the R1200RT for the 2010 model year. The new model had the same horsepower, but more torque at 88 lbf⋅ft (119 N⋅m), a higher engine speed of 8,500 rpm, and double overhead camshafts that were first used on the BMW HP2 Sport.

There were some relatively minor styling changes and revisions to the screen and cockpit designs, switchgear (including conventional indicators), and location of the hydraulic fluid reservoirs.

=== 2014 to 2018 ===
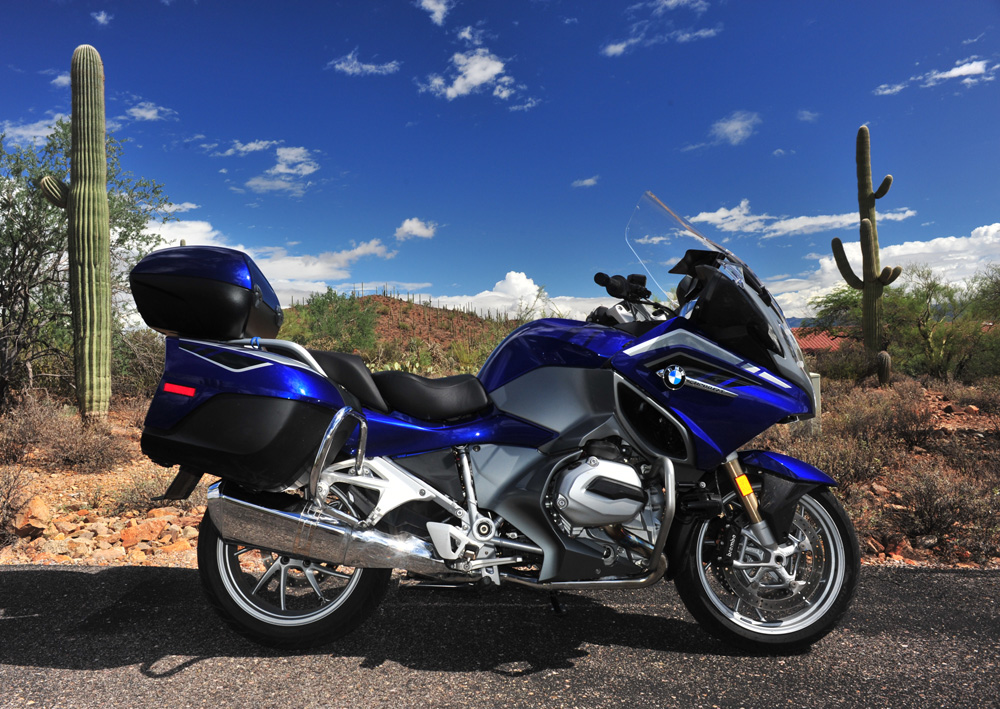
San Marino blue 2015 R1200RT

The 2014 model represented a wholesale redesign of the R1200RT. The biggest change was a shift to a water cooled version of the boxer engine, producing dyno tested 113.5 horsepower (84.6 kW) and 82.1 pound-feet (111.3 N⋅m) torque. BMW claimed 125 horsepower and 92 lb/ft of torque with their own testing methodology. The seat and seating position, fairing, instrumentation, and frame were also updated. The standard ride modes "Rain" and "Road" can also be activated at the press of a button to adapt to weather conditions and road surfaces. An on-board computer, an electrically operated windshield, standard color-matched saddle bags, and heated grips were also basic items.

Optional equipment for the 2014 RT includes semi-active electronic suspension adjustment, and BMW Dynamic ESA, which response to changing road surfaces, and a shift assistant pro that allows the rider to shift up and down without using the clutch or throttle. A central locking system locks both cases by remote control. Other options are a radio, a top case, low or high saddles, a tank bag, cruise control, and (introduced for the 2015 model) keyless ignition and locking

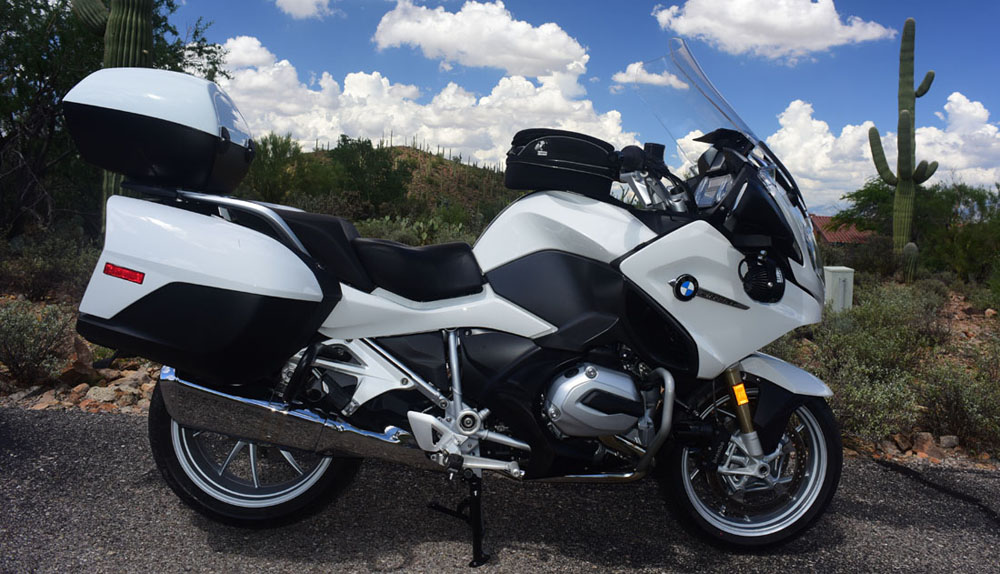
Alpine white 2017 R1200RT

The 2017 R1200RTs are fitted with a judder damper on the transmission output shaft to control rapid and forceful shaking and vibration. New features also include a revised selector drum actuator, transmission shafts, and transmission shaft bearing. As part of the Ride Modes Pro option package, ABS Pro was available, which senses a lean angle and adjusts intervention accordingly.

The only changes for the 2018 model year were colors.

=== 2019 ===
In mid-2017 Motorrad reported that BMW was planning to soon introduce variable valve timing (VVT) on its boxer engines. In March, 2018, Bennetts announced that BMW was testing an RT with VVT, possibly a successor to the R1200RT. In September, Kevin Cameron wrote that a "shift cam" VVT system was destined for a 2019 model year R1250GS, and other media reported the technology was to be adopted on all the R series boxer motors. BMW confirmed the R1250RT would have VVT in September 2018.

== Specifications (2005–2013) ==
See information box for other specifications

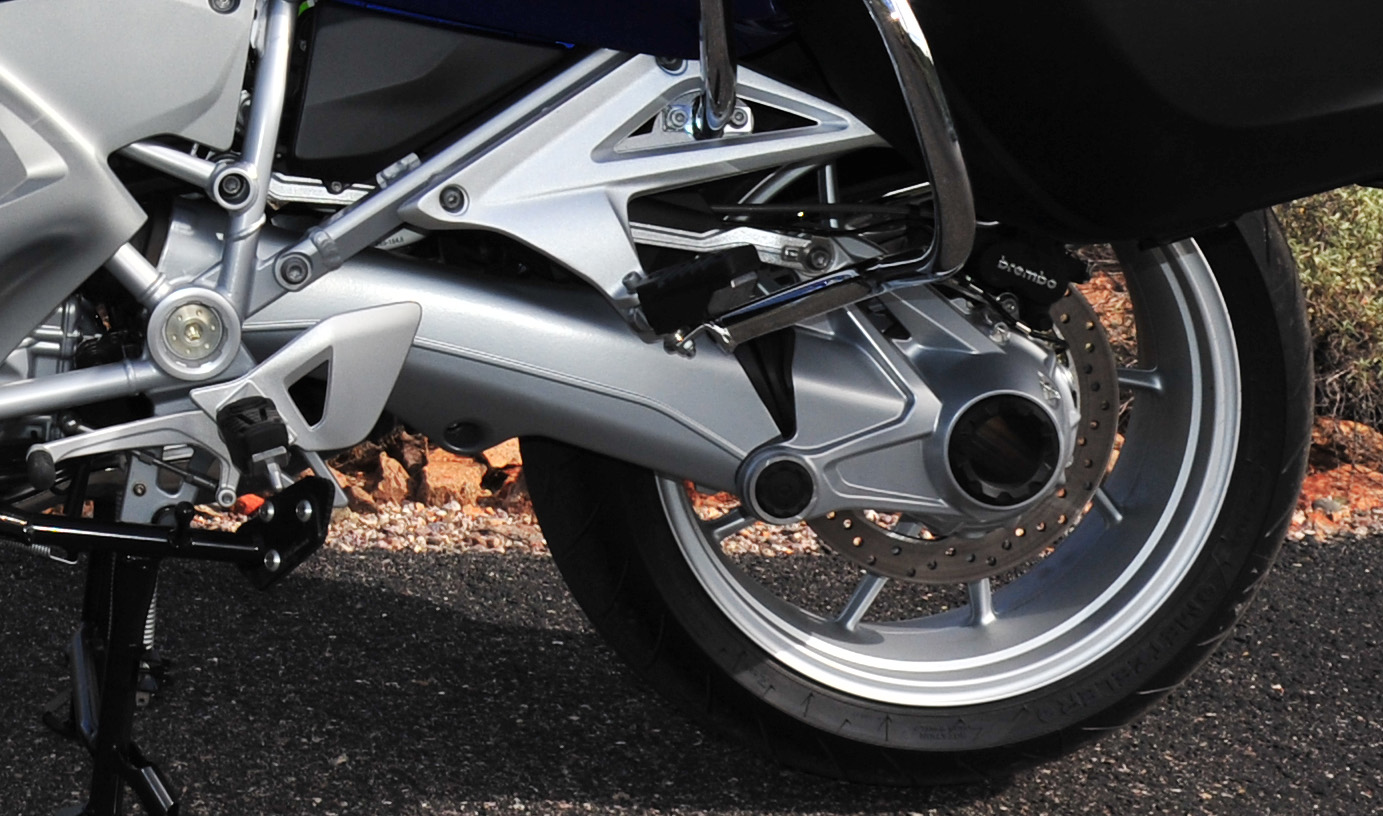
Paralever rear swingarm

=== Engine ===
- Type — Air/oil-cooled, four-stroke two-cylinder boxer engine, dual overhead camshafts per cylinder (single prior to 2010) and four valves per cylinder, central balance shaft
- Mixture control / engine management — Electronic intake pipe injection/digital engine management: BMW engine management, BMS-K with overrun fuel cut-off, dual ignition
- Emission control — Closed-loop three-way catalytic converter
- Fuel type — Unleaded premium, 95 or 98 Octane (RON) with automatic knock control

=== Electrical system ===
- Alternator — 720 watts 60 amperes three-phase alternator
- Battery — 12 volts, 19 ampere hours - 170A

=== Power transmission ===
- Clutch — Single-disc dry clutch, hydraulically operated. Wet clutch after 2014 on LC models.
- Gearbox — Constant-mesh 6-speed sequential gearbox with helical gearing

https://www.bmwmotorcycle.com/2014-bmw-r-1200-rt-information/

=== Chassis ===
- Frame — Three-section frame consisting of front and rear section, load bearing engine-gearbox unit
- Front wheel location / suspension — Telelever; stanchion diameter 35 mm, central spring strut, rebound damping electronically adjustable with standard ESA
- Rear wheel location / suspension — EVO-Paralever die-cast aluminium single-sided swinging arm; spring pre-load hydraulically adjustable to continuously variable levels by means of electronically adjustable ESA, rebound damping with standard ESA
- Travel front/rear — 4.72 inches (120 mm) / 5.31 inches (135 mm)

== Authorities models ==
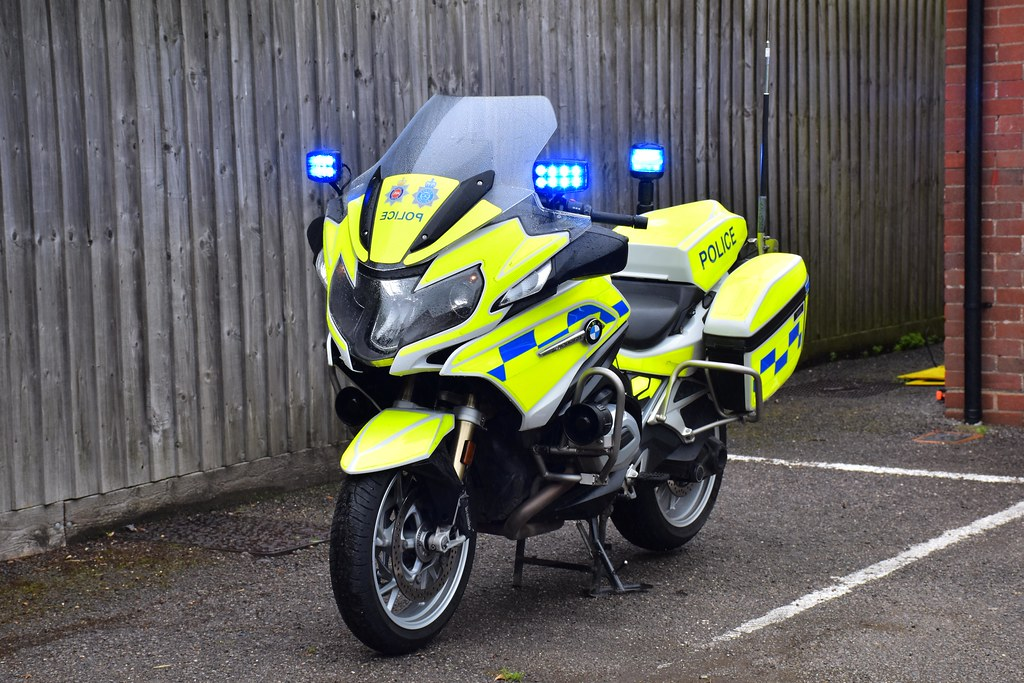
A BMW R1200RT-P police bike used by the Sussex Police.

BMW Authority Vehicles produce factory-built versions of the R1200RT, including an authorities-only 878 cc R900RT model, specifically for emergency services use, including police, paramedic, blood transfusion, fire services, and escort duty.

BMW bikes have been popular with United Kingdom police forces in the past and many chose to return to them in 2007, taking delivery of the R1200RT after the Honda ST1300 Pan-European was withdrawn due to handling concerns. It is also used by the traffic police in Ireland.

Many states and cities in the United States use the R1200RT-P for police duty, mostly in the West including by the California Highway Patrol and Los Angeles County Sheriff's Department. Acceptance of BMW's earlier R1100RT-P and R1150RT-P models had been moderate, but in 2005 came both the introduction of the more capable R1200RT-P and the end of production of Kawasaki's economical KZ1000P police motorcycle. As a result, BMWs and Harley Davidsons have taken most of the American market, though the 2011 re-entry of Kawasaki to the public-safety field has given the RT-P a strong second rival. In the United States, more than 225 law enforcement agencies have BMW authority motorcycles in their fleets of patrol vehicles. BMW claims to have produced over 80,000 motorcycles specifically for public safety use.

The Authorities variant is based on the standard R1200RT but can be recognized by the addition of stainless steel protection bars (colloquially known as "crash bars") situated about the front fairing and panniers, also often used for mounting of additional equipment such as sirens. Paint and trim schemes also reflect the service use, most often black and white "panda paint," such as found on many patrol cars, or silver. The large, flat side panels on the R1200RT-P are a convenient and easily seen location for insignia or reflective stickers. Badges, including the BMW logo on the top yoke or model name on side panels, may be omitted.

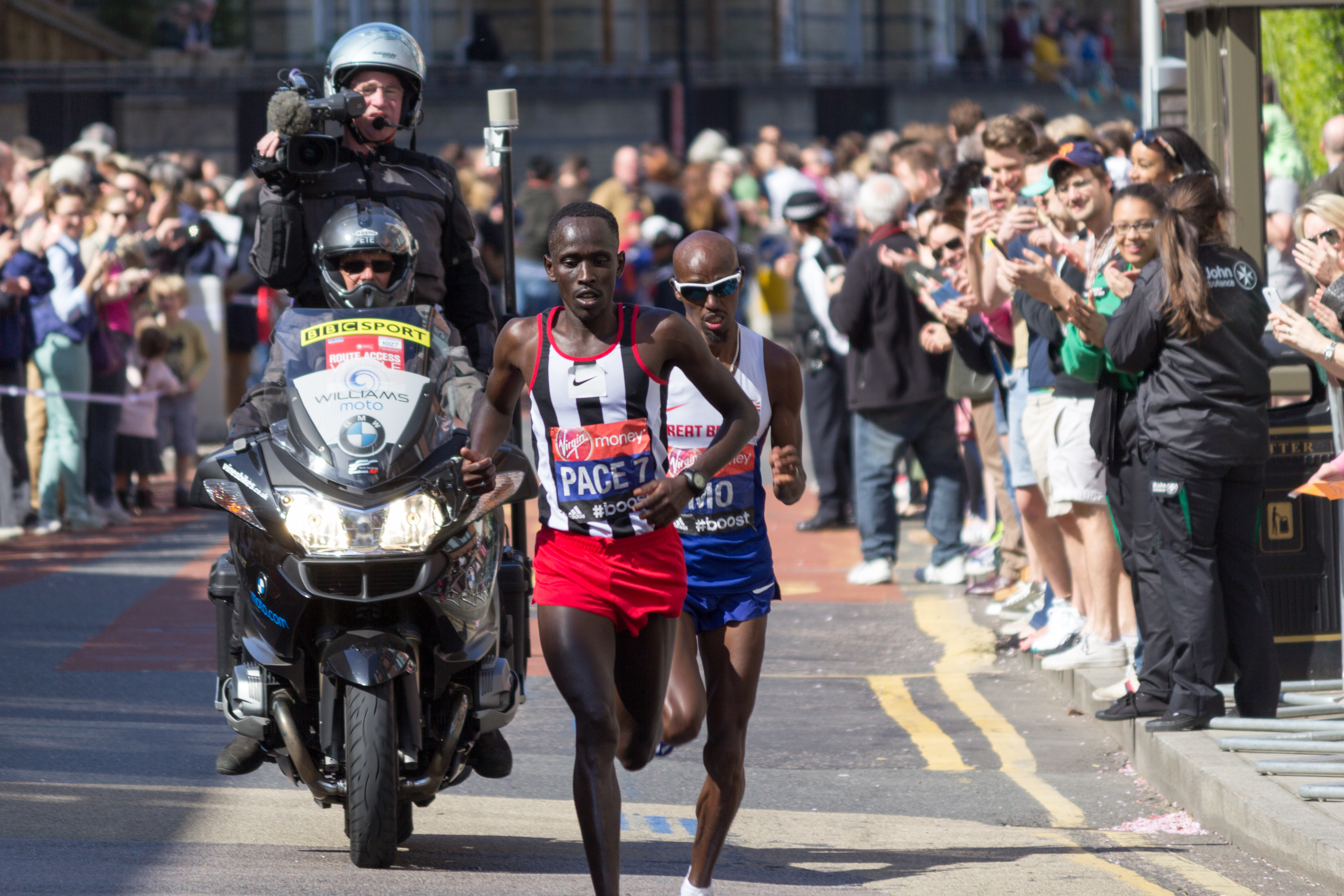
A BMW R1200RT follows Mo Farah.

Other changes include unique top-loading fixed panniers (also known as "saddle boxes"), a single-seat (with radio box in place of the RT's pillion seat), additional switchgear for equipment, emergency lighting, and an additional auxiliary battery which feeds all public safety electrical equipment (to enable their continued operation without depleting the main battery when the engine is switched off). An additional feature of the RT-P is the reprogramming of the onboard computer to allow a motor officer to lock in their current speed on the speedometer display. The officer only needs to match speed with a target vehicle, press the "BC" button on the handlebars, and the speed is visible for later reference.

Optional equipment available through BMW includes electrically operated racks for mounting shotguns or rifles, as well as holders for nightsticks, flashlights, radar or lidar guns, citation books, and radio antenna mounts. Many of these items are also available from aftermarket manufacturers or may even be locally made.

The standard configuration of the R1200RT-P model used in the United States uses a 100-watt siren speaker mounted on the left front protection bar, and LED lighting pods (which were specially designed for the RT-P) above the front turn signals, and on the top rear edge of the radio box, all supplied by Code 3 Public Safety Equipment. There are also mounting hardpoints for mobile radar antennas. Optional lighting which may be installed includes bright lights for illuminating a scene or to the sides, and a light mounted on a telescoping post at the right rear, which can be operated while lowered for normal use, or raised to provide omnidirectional warning while stopped (such as at an accident scene).

=== Firefighting vehicle ===
In July 2010, Merseyside Fire and Rescue Service in England began trialling a Firexpress fire bike version of the R1200RT fitted with twin 25 L (5.5 imp gal; 6.6 US gal) water tanks and a 30 m (98 ft) hose, capable of delivering water spray or foam to extinguish fires.

While not suitable for extended use—due to the small amount of fire retardant and single firefighter carried—the motorcycle is able to reach the scene of a fire faster than a fire truck, especially in cases such as a vehicle fire (which typically results in traffic jams which can delay fire trucks). This may reduce the spread of a fire, or even extinguish it while it is still small. In addition, the firefighter can give a report of the nature of the fire, thus enabling the agency to more rapidly task appropriate equipment

== Reviews and awards ==
The R1200RT was selected as best touring bike by two major American monthly motorcycle magazines in 2005 and 2006.

In September 2006, the R1200RT was named the United Kingdom's 'number one motorcycle' by readers of RiDE magazine in its annual "RiDER POWER" survey. It repeated this achievement in 2007, reached second place overall in 2008, and won the top spot once more in 2009.

In October 2006, the R1200RT was cited as a best tourer for the second year in a row by UK newspaper Motor Cycle News.

The 2014 model was selected as best sport-touring bike of the year by Cycle World.

Road tests published in Motorcyclist praised the 2014 model for its fine engine, "right-sized" ergonomics, and suspension "nearly immune to braking or accelerating influence".

The 2014 model was the winner of the 2014 Rider magazine people's choice vote.

Motorcyclist chose it in 2014 as the best touring bike for 2014. For the second year in a row, Motorcyclist magazine chose the BMW R1200RT as the 2015 "Best Touring Bike."

In its August 2015 long-term wrap-up, Paul Dean, of Cycle World, wrote " For riders who love to travel, enjoy having a little fun on the back roads, and often do both with a passenger, the RT could very well be the perfect motorcycle. Way, way more than just the best sport tourer."

Motorcycle.com selected the R1200RT as its 2015 "Best Sport-Tourer".

== Safety issues ==
The R1200RT has been affected by a number of safety issues since its launch. The UK Vehicle and Operator Services Agency (VOSA) has issued six separate vehicle recalls covering the front brakes, anti-lock braking system, throttle cable, and clutch.
