= BMW R1100RT =

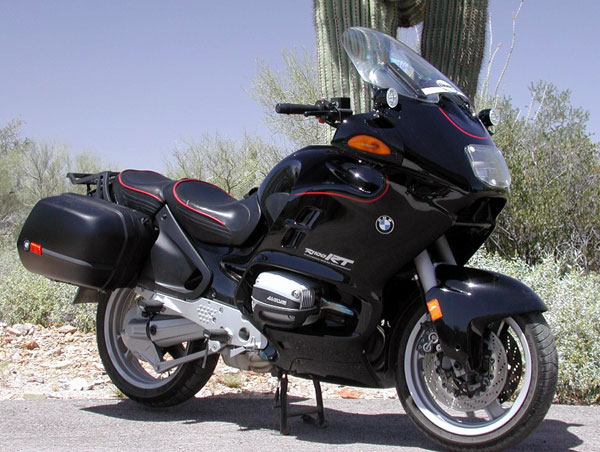
- Manufacturer: BMW Motorrad
- Production: 1995–2001
- Predecessor: R100RT
- Successor: R1150RT
- Class: Tourer
- Engine: Two-cylinder Four-stroke boxer engine
- Top speed: 211 km/h (131 mph)
- Power: 66 kW (90 hp) at 7250 rpm
- Torque: 95 Nm (70 ft lb) at 5500 rpm
- Transmission: 5-speed sequential manual transmission
- Brakes: Front: Two four-piston fixed calipers with dual floating disc brake of 305 mm. Rear: Two-piston caliper fixed disc of 276 mm. ABS.
- Wheelbase: 1,485 mm (58.5 in)
- Seat height: 810 mm (31.9 in)
- Related: R850RT

The BMW R1100RT is a BMW touring motorcycle with a horizontally opposed twin-cylinder boxer engine. It was built from 1996 to 2001 in the BMW Berlin plant in Spandau, together with several sister models of similar design, including the R1100R, R1100GS and R1100RS, with almost identical engines but different engine tunes, trim levels and chassis details.

== General ==
The R1100RT was released in 1996 as a successor to the R100RT. In addition to extensive changes to the full fairing, the engine power was increased significantly from 44 to 66 kW (60 to 90 hp), and the capacity increased from 971 cc to 1085 cc. It has a bore of 99 mm, a stroke of 70.5 mm, and a compression ratio of 10.7:1. Top speed is 211 km/h, and the time to accelerate from 0 to 100 km/h is 3.9 seconds.

The bike comes standard with an anti-lock braking system and a regulated three-way catalytic converter. The chassis is constructed in three parts and consists of front and rear frame and a co-supporting ligands motor-gear unit. The suspension was formed on the front by a Telelever and the rear via a Paralever swingarm.

The fuel tank holds 25.2 litres (6.6 gallons), 6 litres (1.5 gallons) reserve. The average fuel consumption is 3.9 litres per 100 km (~60mpg) at a speed of 86 km/h (~55mph) or 4.7 litres (50mpg) at 120 km/h (75mph). The manufacturer recommends the use of petrol with a knock resistance of at least 95 RON / 91 octane. The front tyres have the dimensions 120/70 ZR 17 and rear 160/60 ZR 18. The bike weighs 285 kg (628lbs) in running order and has a maximum additional payload of 205 kg (452 lb).

In 2001, the R1100RT was superseded by the R1150RT.

Touring motorcycles with comparable equipment and motor characteristics are the Honda Pan-European, the Honda Gold Wing and the Triumph Trophy 1200.
