= Trail braking =

Driving and motorcycle riding technique

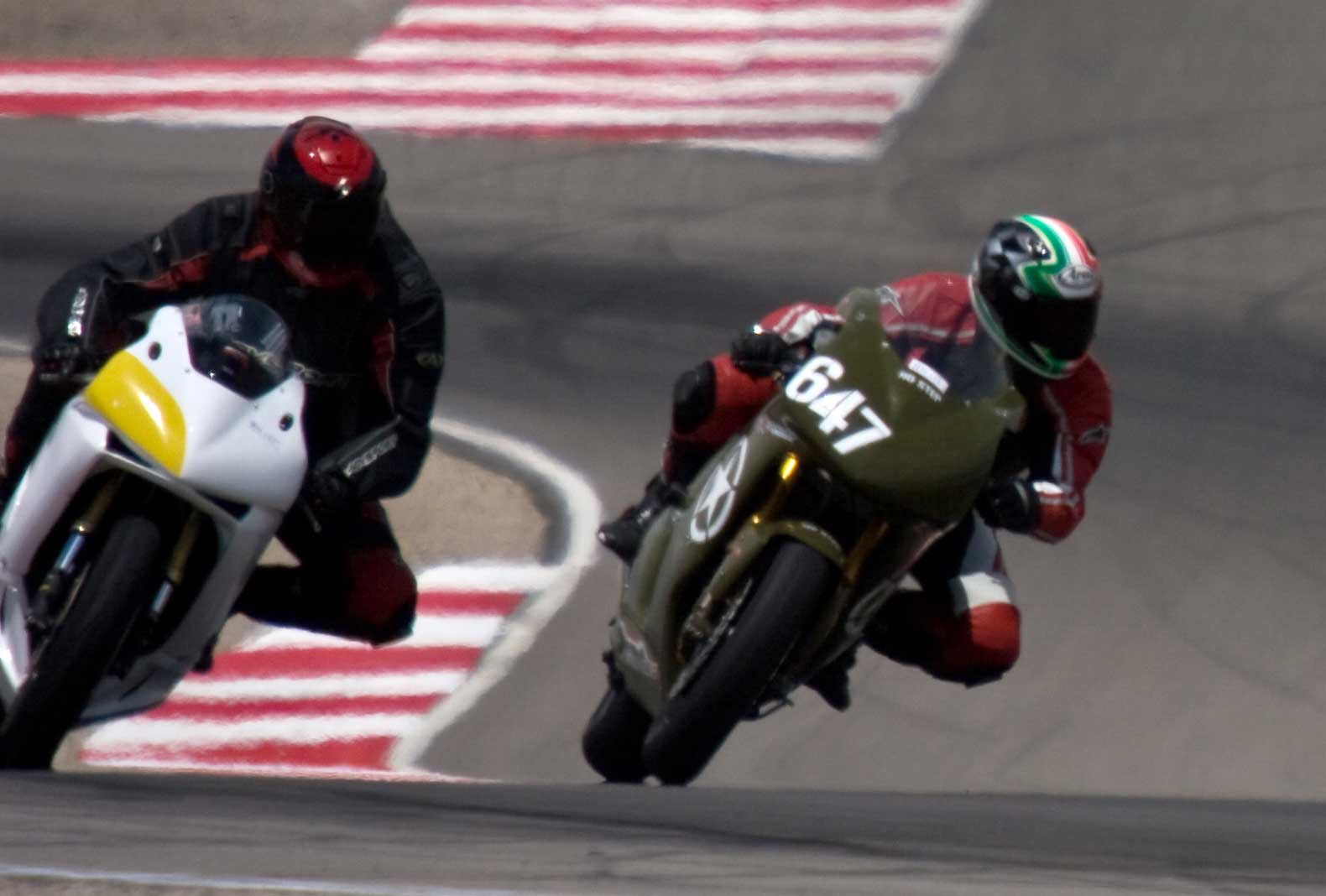
Trail braking into a corner at Miller Motorsports Park, USA

Trail braking is a driving and motorcycle riding technique where the brakes are used beyond the entrance to a turn (turn-in), and then gradually released (trailed off). Depending on a number of factors, the driver fully releases brake pressure at any point between turn-in and the apex of the turn.

== Motorcycling ==
In applying this technique, motorcycle riders approach turns applying front brakes to reduce speed. As they enter the turn, they slowly ease off the brakes, gradually decreasing or trailing off the brakes as motorcycle lean increases. This is done for several reasons.

First, it gives more traction because the downward force on the front tire is increased by load transfer. Second, as the brakes are applied and the weight shifts forward, the forks are compressed. The compression of the forks changes the motorcycle's steering geometry, decreasing stability in a way that makes the motorcycle more apt to lean and more quickly change direction. Third, decreasing speed decreases the motorcycle's cornering radius. Conversely, accelerating while turning increases the motorcycle's cornering radius.

Fourth, trailing off the brakes while entering blind or tight corners allows the rider to slow if something unexpected blocks the rider's path. Because the motorcycle is already on the brakes ('in the friction zone') and the front tire is getting additional traction from load transfer, increasing the braking power while trail braking carries a reduced risk of instability (due to, for example, sudden 'gripping' of the brakes and subsequent brake lock-up) and/or loss of tyre traction compared to 'normal', non-trail braking cornering, though a lot still depends on surface conditions and lean angle.

Traditionally, trail braking is done exclusively with the front brake, even though trailing the rear brake will also effectively slow the motorcycle and decrease the turning radius. The rear brake-only variant carries a major backdraw, however: using the rear brake does not compress the front suspension; therefore, it will not -- indeed can never -- be as effective as the traditional front-brake-only variant in terms of both maneuverability and stability, because it misses out on the component benefits of load transfer and steering geometry changes, because

The rider's ability to correctly choose their turn in, apex, and exit points reduces or eliminates the need for prolonged trailing of the brakes into turns. This technique is commonly used when racing, but can enhance control, increase sight distance through the turn, and add evasive options, in street riding.

=== Risks ===
There is risk with trail braking because excessive use of the front brake can result in a loss of grip as the tire's traction is split between braking and cornering forces. Effective trail braking requires finesse from the rider, which can be difficult to learn.

=== Variation in training ===
Motorcycle training curriculums vary in whether they introduce trail braking to beginning street riders, or focus on other skills at first and introduce the topic to intermediate riders later.

Guides such as the Motorcycle Safety Foundation Basic RiderCourse teach that the safest way for a beginning rider to approach a corner on a motorcycle is by doing all slowing, whether with brakes or engine, before the entrance of the turn, discouraging the use of any brakes while the motorcycle is leaned over. The reasons for not trail braking on the street, at least for beginners, include that the steep learning curve of trail braking makes it appropriate only for the race track. The benefit of learning trail braking to the street rider is that knowing and understanding how to slow while entering a corner gives a greater safety margin, particularly in blind, decreasing radius or downhill corners.

Freddie Spencer, founder of the Freddie Spencer's High Performance Riding School, as well as Nick Ienatsch, author of the 2003 book Sport Riding Techniques and chief instructor of Yamaha Champions Riding School, say trail braking should be used in nearly every corner as a means to help the motorcycle change direction, and that trail braking gives the rider more control and significantly increases rider safety.

Spencer and Ienatsch say the physics of angular acceleration mean that the slower any vehicle is going, the tighter the radius of the corner it can navigate. Instructor Keith Code said that, as soon as possible after initiating a turn, the rider should increase throttle smoothly and progressively throughout the turn. Spencer said that for every radius, motorcycle, and rider combination there is a maximum speed at which the turn can be navigated without exiting the road or suffering a low side crash. Code is saying that as long as this maximum speed is not exceeded, proper throttle control throughout the turn will result in higher corner exit speeds and faster lap times.

== Car driving ==
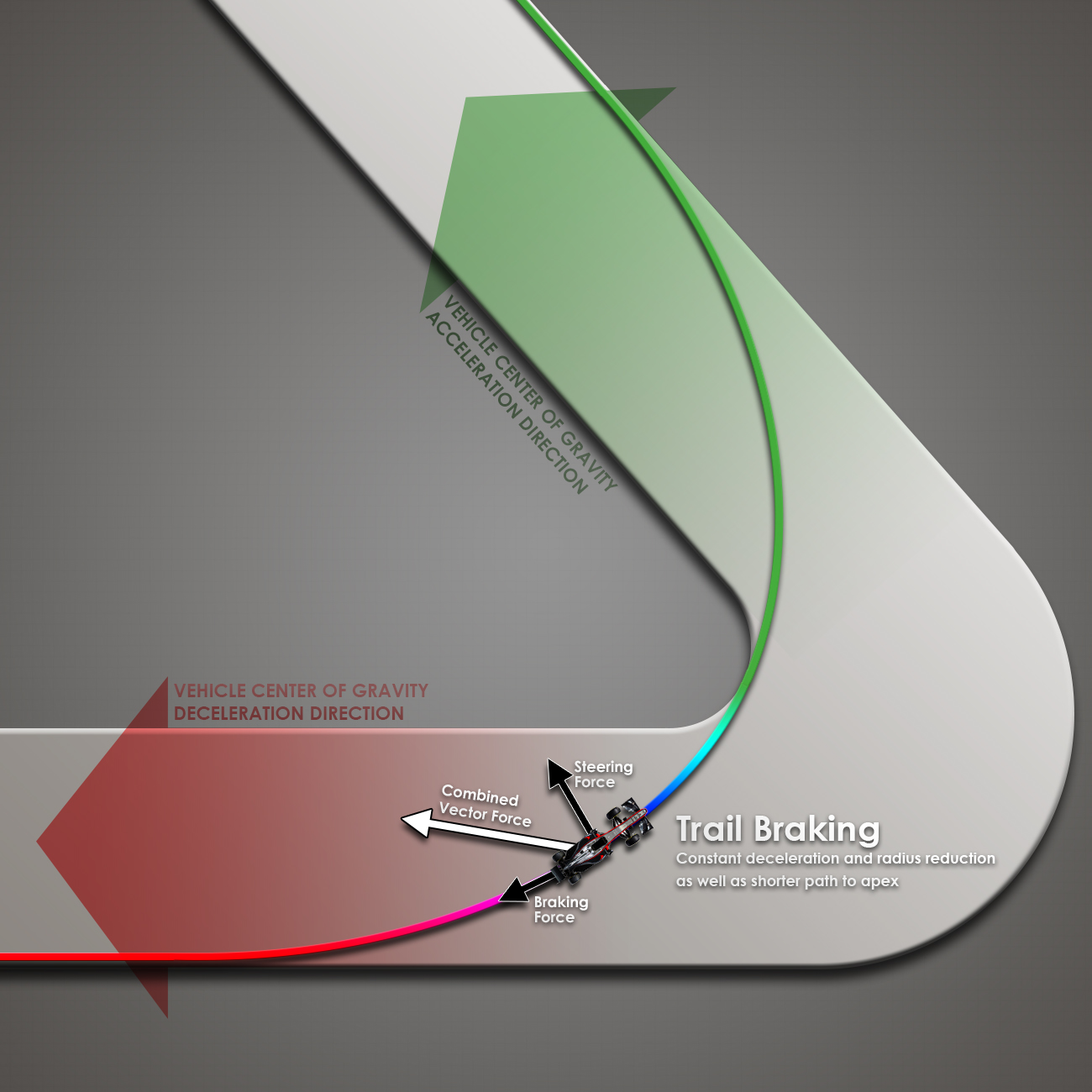
Trail braking showing combined vector force from tires

In four wheel vehicles trail braking is using the brakes past the corner entrance, as opposed to the normally taught practice of releasing the brakes before starting the turn. It creates weight transfer to the front tires, increasing their traction and reducing understeer. It works best in light vehicles that have their brake bias to the front.

In order to be properly performed, the driver must have excellent sense of the vehicle's behavior and be able to keep the braking effort within very tight limits. Excessive braking effort may result in the vehicle heavily understeering, or — if the brake bias is set to nearly neutral — in the rear wheels locking, effectively causing the vehicle to spin as in a handbrake turn.

Mastering trail braking can help a driver enter corners at higher speeds, or help avoid an accident if the driver has entered a corner at a speed exceeding the abilities of either the driver or the vehicle.

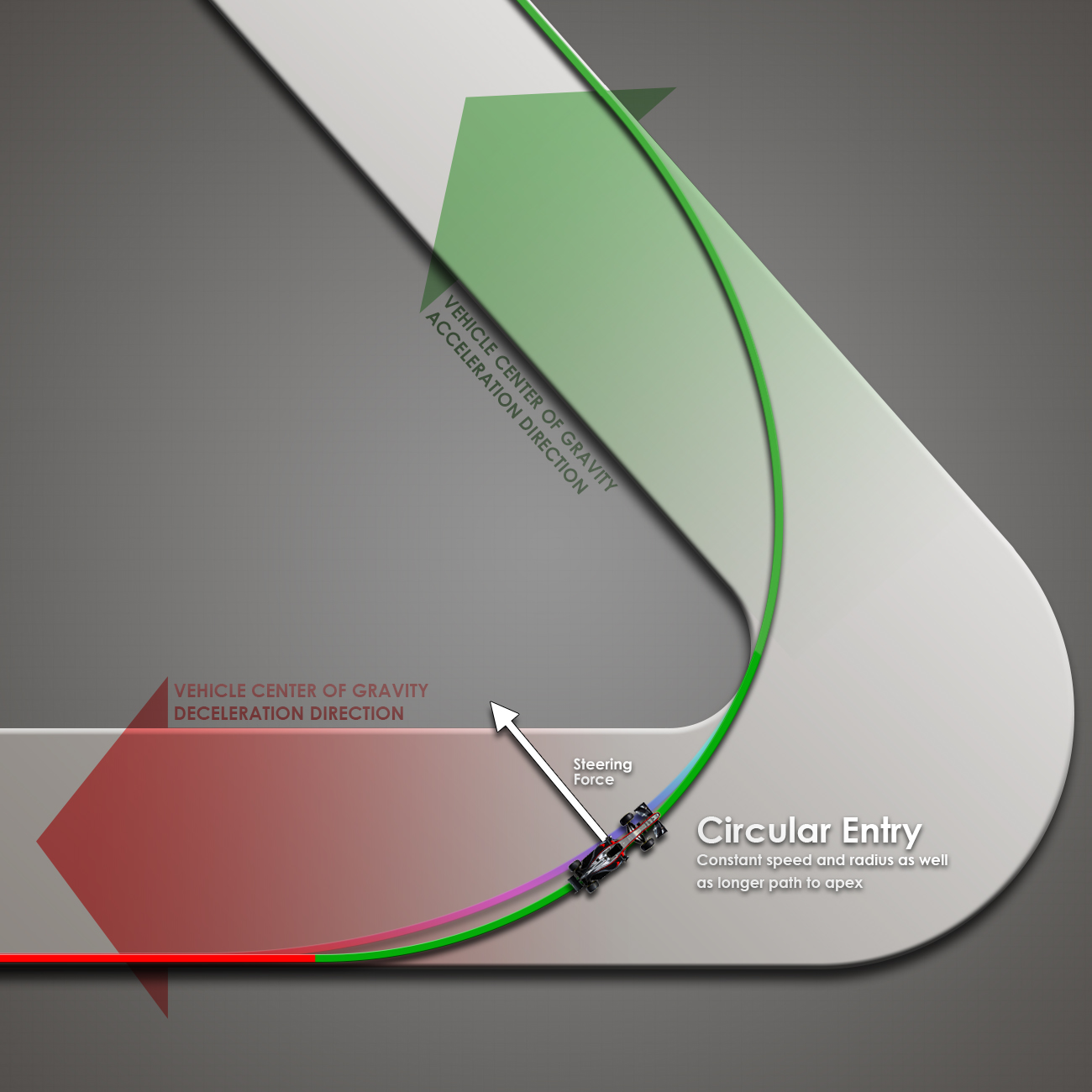
Traditional corner entry with no trail braking

There are two reasons for trail braking:

1. Keeps load on the front tires so the car will turn into the corner better. That is, it will rotate (change direction) better.
2. Maximizes tire traction through the corner. If the driver gets to the turn-in point and suddenly takes their foot off the brake pedal as they turn in, there will be a fraction of a moment when they are not using up all of the tires’ traction. They could be using more and carrying more speed.

A side benefit of trail braking — although this should not be considered a reason for using it — is that it often allows the driver to begin to brake later, since they are ending the braking later.

Trail braking is not used in every corner. There are turns, especially very fast ones, where the driver wants to be squeezing back on the throttle about the time they are turning into the corner, since this helps the car's balance and the overall grip level. As a general rule, the slower and tighter the turn, the more the driver will use trail braking to help rotate the car; the faster and more sweeping the turn, the less the driver will use trail braking.

=== Racing ===
A drift-inducing technique called "the brake drift" is used in racing, involving a series of light rear brake trail-braking pulses (usually 2 or 3), followed by a momentary full-force rear braking and sharp releasing of the rear brakes. Mastering continuous trail braking as used under road conditions is a prerequisite for learning brake drifting. This is one of the most used drifting techniques in rally racing because - if done properly - it allows the driver to enter and exit the corner with full throttle.

Depending upon cornering situations, techniques like trail braking can be used to maintain more speed upon entry of a corner, and attaining more grip while turning into the corner, and has an effect on apex selection. In this technique, brake pressure is applied slightly later than usual upon deceleration, and is maintained during steering input, sometimes all the way to the apex. The action of braking causes a weight transfer in the vehicle, shifting more weight from the rear of the car forward to the front tires, increasing the normal force on them and in turn increasing the amount of traction the front (steering) wheels have. Because of the characteristics of weight transfer, this technique causes weight to be shifted away from the rear of the car, resulting in lower rear traction, and can be used to induce oversteer in some cases.

== Physics of trail braking ==
As compared to the traditional circular entry, trail braking reduces the time for the requisite direction change needed to reach the driver's chosen apex. With the traditional corner entry where all deceleration is completed prior to steering input, the vehicle carries a constant speed and radius to the apex. The combined peak tire forces act on the car perpendicular to its direction of travel to accelerate it toward its current turn center. The vehicle takes a circular path to the apex at a constant speed.

In comparison, trail braking splits up the peak force the tire is able to generate partially toward braking (longitudinal force acting on a tangent to the direction of travel), and partially toward steering (lateral force acting perpendicular to direction of travel). See the traction circle for more info. The combined vector force acting on the vehicle's center of gravity accelerates it in a more rearward direction as shown in the illustration. This causes the vehicle to travel on an Euler spiral-shaped path of constant radius and speed reduction.

== See also ==
- Slip angle
