= USBA =

USBA may refer to:

- United States Boxing Association, the predecessor of the International Boxing Federation
- United States Bicycle Motocross Association
- Utah Sport Bike Association
- Uniformed Services Benefit Association
- United States Billiard Association, the governing body for all Carom Billiard games in the USA including 3-Cushion Billiards.
- USB-A type USB connector
