= Henry N. Manney III =

American journalist

Henry Newman Manney III
- Born: March 27, 1922; Quantico, Virginia, US
- Died: March 15, 1988 (aged 65); Newport Beach, California, US
- Education: Duke University
- Occupation: Journalist
- Awards: 1989 Ken W. Purdy award

Henry Newman Manney III (March 27, 1922 – March 15, 1988) was an American correspondent and journalist best known for his writings on automobiles, motorcycles, auto racing, and travel.

== Early years and education ==
Henry N. Manney III was born in Quantico, Virginia, on 27 March 1922. He was the son of Marine Colonel and Silver Star recipient Henry N. Manney Junior, and the grandson of US Navy Chief of the Bureau of Equipment, Rear-Admiral Henry N. Manney.

Manney attended Duke University, where he majored in English. He joined the United States Army in 1943 as a private and was stationed at Truax Field in Wisconsin. He served for three years as a radar mechanic. When his military career ended Manney used his G.I. Bill education benefits to pay for ballet lessons. He met ballerina Margaret Anne Statz, daughter of Major League outfielder Arnold "Jigger" Statz, in a studio, and the two were part of a ballet company that toured briefly through the US and Central and South America.

For a time Manney worked in sales at Jim Barlow's International Motors before the start of his writing career.

== Racing career, move to Europe ==
Through the early 1950s Manney was racing cars in the US, driving a Crosley Hotshot (eventually supercharged), a Siata 300 BC and a Deutsch Bonnet. He built a Crosley-based special called "Georgette-the-Racer", which he raced without much success and whose body was recycled into Chet Lancaster's Georgette. Later that same decade Manney relocated to Europe, where the highlight of his racing career was his appearance in the 1957 Mille Miglia in an Alfa Romeo Giulietta Veloce.

== Writing career ==
Manney started writing about motor racing in the mid-1950s. Gus Vignolle was the editor of Motoracing magazine, and his secretary, Anne Evans, was an acquaintance of Manney's. Evans asked Manney to write an article for the magazine. Manney remarked, "They were fool enough to print it, and since I found I could get into the races free, I have never looked back." That first column, titled "How to Watch a Road Race", appeared in the November 18–25, 1955 issue.

Some of his early work appeared in Car and Driver magazine. After relocating to Europe, Manney began writing for British auto magazines, such as the UK-based magazine Small Car, which became Car magazine in 1965.

In 1961, Manney became the overseas correspondent for Road & Track, with his first article for them appearing in the July 1961 issue. He did double duty for many of his stories, both writing the copy and shooting the accompanying photographs. Manney's coverage of European Formula 1 (F1) events is credited with raising the profile of F1 racing in the United States. His regular column at Road & Track was titled "At Large", wherein he reported on auto racing, auto shows, and the auto industry in general, and wrote pieces on travel and food, often ending with his signature valediction, "Yr Faithfl Srvnt".

Manney is credited with creating a unique style of automotive writing, different than what had gone before. His reports are said to be so rich and vivid that the reader experiences the scene through his description. Among his most well-known works was a four-part series titled "What To Do While Motoring In Europe", and his account of a visit to a naturist enclave titled "Incompleat Guide to the Île du Levant". Manney also wrote an analysis of Ford's failure at Le Mans in the style of "Casey at the Bat".

In 1966 Manney returned to the US from Europe, and continued his association with Road & Track. For the magazine's April issues he began to contribute a series of road tests of "vehicles" such as a roller-coaster car, a pogo stick, and a motorized skateboard, which review included a picture of Manney in a full suit of medieval armor. During this period he also wrote for Road & Track's sister automotive magazine, Car Life, and was editor-at-large for their motorcycling magazine Cycle World, to which he contributed both articles and reviews.

== Personal life ==
Manney and Margaret Anne Statz were married on February 16, 1953. They went on to have three children: Henry Newman Manney IV, Patrick Gregory Jude, and Mary Cecilia Alexandra.

Manney owned a varied assortment of cars that included makes such as Moretti, Lancia, and Mercedes-Benz. He also owned at least three Ferraris. In 1952 he purchased 1950 Ferrari 275S America Barchetta Touring, chassis 0032MT. In 1955, he bought 1950 Ferrari 166, chassis 0060 M. And in 1965, he acquired 1963 Ferrari GTO, chassis 5111GT.

In a 1977 review, Manney recounted riding a Harley Davidson flathead as a young man. Among the other bikes he owned were a vintage Yamaha, a new Bultaco, and a BMW 750 Twin. His later motorcycle collection included a 1956 Manx Norton, a 1966 Matchless G85CS, a 1938 Velocette KSS, and a 1973 Triumph 500 ISDT.

Apart from automobiles and motorcycles, Manney's interests included baseball, classical and dixieland music, opera, and ballet.

Manney suffered a debilitating cerebral hemorrhage late in 1981. He died on March 15, 1988, one day before his father-in-law. A joint funeral for Manney and Statz was held on 18 March 1988 at Our Lady Queen of Angels Church in Newport Beach, California.

== Awards ==
Manney received the International Motor Press Association's Ken W. Purdy award posthumously in 1989.

== Testimonials ==
Henry Manney was ever the gentleman, joking, chatting, putting people at ease, and leaving a trail of amusement and good humor. When you heard his voice in the hall, you smiled and said to yourself, "Oh good, Henry's here", and genuinely looked forward to a good conversation, the way you look forward to a good meal or a cold beer when you're hungry or thirsty. He was a form of refuge from everything tedious and commonplace, just like his motor home. ... We've lost a rare man, a great writer, and a good friend.

— Peter Egan, automotive journalist.

One of the most loved and charismatic individuals of the West Coast sports car community, Henry was a man of class and widespread interests. ... Reviews of local food, wine, hotels, and other travel-related bits were written with a sense of wit and humor that nobody in the motor press world has ever repeated.

— Rex McAfee, automotive author and editor.
