= Scott Russell (motorcyclist) =

American motorcycle racer

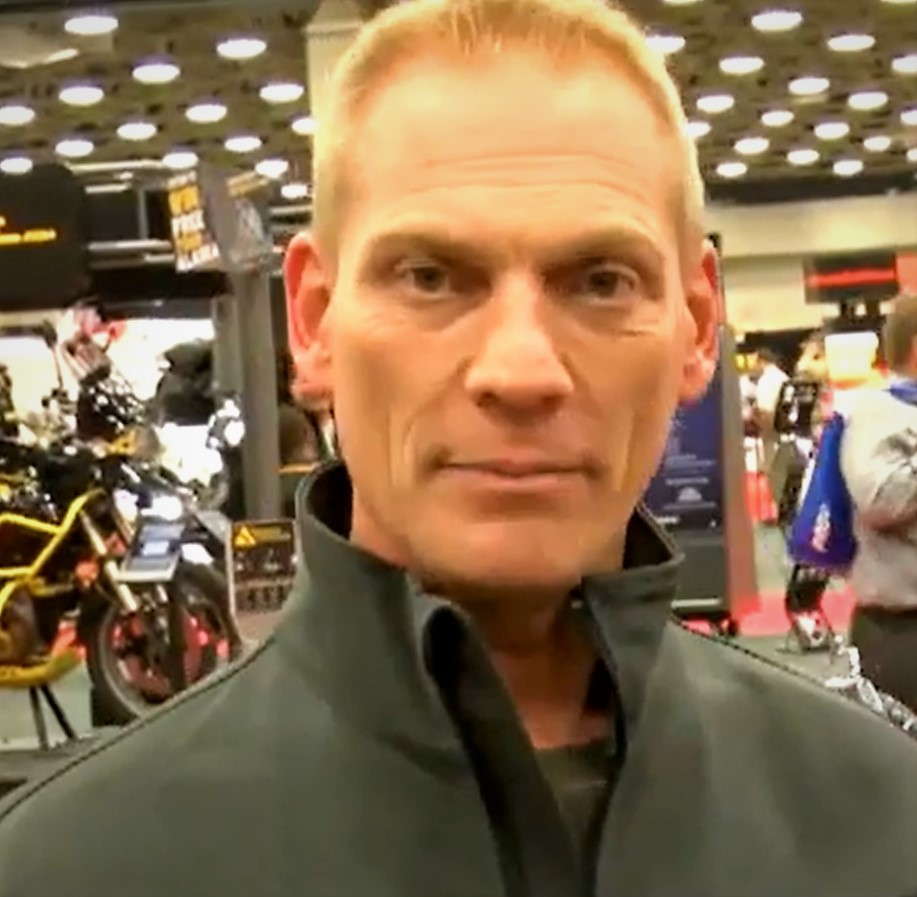
- Russell at the 2011 Dallas International Motorcycle Show
- Nationality: American
Motorcycle racing career statistics
Grand Prix motorcycle racing
| Active years | 1995 - 1996 |
| First race | 1995 500cc Italian Grand Prix |
| Last race | 1996 500cc Australian Grand Prix |
| Team | Suzuki |
Starts / Wins / Podiums / Poles / F. laps / Points; 19 / 0 / 2 / 0 / 1 / 176
Superbike World Championship
| Active years | 1989 - 1995, 1997 - 1998 |
| Manufacturers | Kawasaki, Yamaha |
| Championships | 1 (1993) |
| 1998 championship position | 10th |
Starts / Wins / Podiums / Poles / F. laps / Points; 118 / 14 / 39 / 8 / 8 / 1201

Raymond Scott Russell (born October 28, 1964), a.k.a. Mr. Daytona, is an American former professional motorcycle and sports car racer. He is a former World Superbike and AMA Superbike Champion, has won the Daytona 200 a record five times, and won the Suzuka 8 Hours in 1993. Russell is the all-time leader in 750 cc AMA Supersport wins. In 2005, he was inducted into the AMA Motorcycle Hall of Fame.

== Motorcycle racing career ==
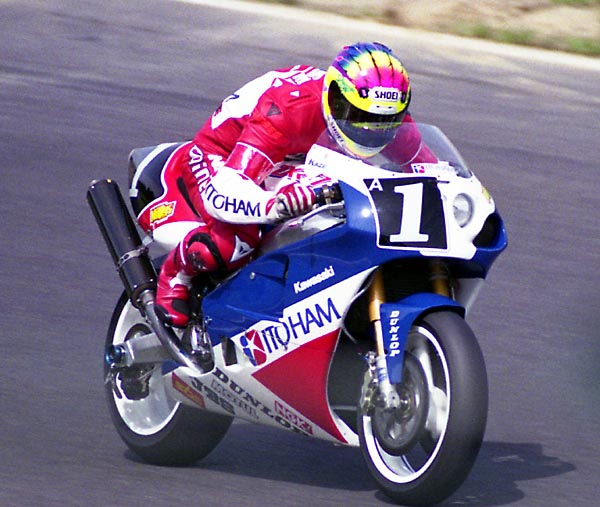
Russell at the 1993 Suzuka 8 Hours

Russell was born in East Point, Georgia. After racing motocross as a child, Russell raced in WERA events before reaching AMA in 1987. In 1988 he was runner-up in the 750 cc Supersport class and also had some successes in Superbike and 600 cc Supersport. He was Superbike runner-up in 1989, before winning the 750 cc Supersport title three years in a row from 1990 to 1992 and winning every race in 1991. In 1992, Russell claimed the AMA Superbike championship. In the 1995 Daytona 200, he crashed on the second lap, but got back on the bike and won, finishing ahead of Carl Fogarty.

Having previously scored a handful of World Superbike podiums, Russell became the Superbike world champion riding for Muzzy Kawasaki in 1993, and was runner-up in 1994. He left the series after a poor start to 1995, replacing the retired Kevin Schwantz at Suzuki in the 500 cc Grand Prix world championship. Staying with Suzuki in 1996 he finished sixth overall.

Russell returned to World Superbikes with Yamaha in 1997, coming sixth overall with a pole and two podiums. In 1998, he came tenth overall but rarely ran near the front. His season is most remembered for the Laguna Seca round, in which he made a blatant jump start and ignored the instruction to come in for a stop-go penalty, eventually falling off, almost causing teammate Noriyuki Haga to crash. Russell had an unsuccessful spell racing Harley-Davidson bikes in the AMA Superbike championship during the following two years. His final year in AMA Superbike ended at the first race of 2001 at Daytona after a move to the HMC Ducati team. Ducati had high hopes that "Mr. Daytona" would help them achieve their first ever 200 win. However, during the start, Russell's bike stalled and was hit from behind after trying to move out of the way to the side of the track. Russell suffered severe injuries which ultimately ended his two-wheeled career.

In 2005, Russell was inducted into the AMA Motorcycle Hall of Fame. Scott returned to the highbanks of Daytona in 2008 on a Jamie James prepared Yamaha R1. Russell began serving as lead motorcycle road racing analyst for SPEED TV in May 2009, replacing Freddie Spencer whose European scheduling conflicts led to the change.

In 2008, Russell made the switch professionally to four wheels, racing in the Grand American Road Racing Association in both the Rolex Sports Car Series and Koni Challenge (now Continental Tire Sports Car Challenge) series. In the 2010 season, he won Round 11 at Montreal along with co-driver Paul Edwards.

In 2014, Russell spoke at Yale University alongside Ken Hill, Nick Ienatsch, and Jamie Bestwick about motorcycle racing and success. As of 2016, Russell is an instructor at Yamaha Champions Riding School and Rickdiculous Racing.

== Career statistics ==
=== Superbike World Championship ===
==== Races by year ====
| Year | Make | 1 | | 2 | | 3 | | 4 | | 5 | | 6 | | 7 | | 8 | | 9 | | 10 | | 11 | | 12 | | 13 | | Pos. | Pts |
| Year | Make | R1 | R2 | R1 | R2 | R1 | R2 | R1 | R2 | R1 | R2 | R1 | R2 | R1 | R2 | R1 | R2 | R1 | R2 | R1 | R2 | R1 | R2 | R1 | R2 | R1 | R2 | Pos. | Pts |
|---|---|---|---|---|---|---|---|---|---|---|---|---|---|---|---|---|---|---|---|---|---|---|---|---|---|---|---|---|---|
| 1989 | Suzuki | GBR | GBR | HUN | HUN | CAN | CAN | USA; 15 | USA; 17 | AUT | AUT | FRA | FRA | JPN | JPN | GER | GER | ITA | ITA | AUS | AUS | NZL | NZL | | | | | 80th | 1 |
| 1990 | Kawasaki | SPA | SPA | GBR | GBR | HUN | HUN | GER | GER | CAN | CAN | USA; 10 | USA; 7 | AUT | AUT | JPN | JPN | FRA | FRA | ITA | ITA | MAL | MAL | AUS | AUS | NZL | NZL | 35th | 15 |
| 1991 | Kawasaki | GBR | GBR | SPA | SPA | CAN | CAN | USA; 2 | USA; 2 | AUT | AUT | SMR | SMR | SWE | SWE | JPN; 8 | JPN; 5 | MAL | MAL | GER | GER | FRA | FRA | ITA | ITA | AUS | AUS | 17th | 53 |
| 1992 | Kawasaki | SPA; Ret | SPA; 7 | GBR; 3 | GBR; 3 | GER; 4 | GER; 7 | BEL; 3 | BEL; 9 | SPA | SPA | AUT | AUT | ITA | ITA | MAL | MAL | JPN | JPN | NED | NED | ITA | ITA | AUS | AUS | NZL | NZL | 11th | 83 |
| 1993 | Kawasaki | **IRL**; 2 | **IRL**; 2 | **GER**; 6 | **GER**; 1 | SPA; 27 | SPA; 2 | SMR; 4 | SMR; 2 | **AUT**; 3 | **AUT**; 7 | CZE; 2 | CZE; 1 | SWE; 4 | SWE; 2 | MAL; 2 | MAL; 2 | JPN; 8 | JPN; 1 | NED; 2 | NED; 2 | **ITA**; 2 | **ITA**; 5 | GBR; 1 | GBR; 1 | POR; Ret | POR; 2 | 1st | 378,5 |
| 1994 | Kawasaki | **GBR**; 4 | **GBR**; 1 | **GER**; 1 | **GER**; 1 | **ITA**; 1 | **ITA**; 2 | SPA; Ret | SPA; Ret | AUT; 14 | AUT; 12 | INA; 3 | INA; 3 | JPN; 1 | JPN; 1 | NED; 6 | NED; 9 | SMR; 1 | SMR; Ret | EUR; 1 | EUR; 1 | AUS; 2 | AUS; 17 | | | | | 2nd | 280 |
| 1995 | Kawasaki | GER; 8 | GER; 10 | SMR; 14 | SMR; 8 | GBR; 6 | GBR; Ret | ITA | ITA | SPA | SPA | AUT | AUT | USA | USA | EUR | EUR | JPN | JPN | NED | NED | INA | INA | AUS | AUS | | | 18th | 34 |
| 1997 | Yamaha | AUS; 7 | AUS; 6 | SMR; Ret | SMR; 6 | GBR; 6 | GBR; 7 | GER; 3 | GER; 4 | **ITA**; 5 | **ITA**; 8 | USA; 6 | USA; 4 | EUR; 2 | EUR; 5 | AUT; 7 | AUT; 4 | NED; 6 | NED; 8 | SPA; Ret | SPA; 5 | JPN; 12 | JPN; Ret | INA; 6 | INA; 5 | | | 6th | 226 |
| 1998 | Yamaha | AUS; 10 | AUS; 8 | GBR; 13 | GBR; 11 | ITA; Ret | ITA; Ret | SPA; 6 | SPA; 9 | GER; 11 | GER; Ret | SMR; 8 | SMR; 6 | RSA; 10 | RSA; 9 | USA; 15 | USA; Ret | EUR; 3 | EUR; 8 | AUT; 12 | AUT; 11 | NED; 9 | NED; Ret | JPN; 5 | JPN; 12 | | | 10th | 130,5 |

=== Grand Prix motorcycle racing ===
==== By season ====
| Season | Class | Motorcycle | Race | Win | Podium | Pole | FLap | Pts | Plcd |
|---|---|---|---|---|---|---|---|---|---|
| 1995 | 500cc | Suzuki | 6 | 0 | 0 | 0 | 0 | 43 | 13th |
| 1996 | 500cc | Suzuki | 13 | 0 | 2 | 0 | 1 | 133 | 6th |
| Total | | | **19** | **0** | **2** | **0** | **1** | **176** | |

==== Races by year ====
(key) (Races in bold indicate pole position, races in italics indicate fastest lap)

| Year | Class | Bike | 1 | 2 | 3 | 4 | 5 | 6 | 7 | 8 | 9 | 10 | 11 | 12 | 13 | 14 | 15 | Pos | Pts |
|---|---|---|---|---|---|---|---|---|---|---|---|---|---|---|---|---|---|---|---|
| 1995 | 500cc | Suzuki | AUS | MAL | JPN | SPA | GER | ITA; 11 | NED; 12 | FRA; 6 | GBR; DNS | CZE; 11 | BRA; 5 | ARG; Ret | EUR; 8 | | | 13th | 43 |
| 1996 | 500cc | Suzuki | MAL; 4 | INA; 7 | JPN; 3 | SPA; DNS | ITA | FRA; 5 | NED; 4 | GER; 4 | GBR; 5 | AUT; 6 | CZE; 3 | IMO; 7 | CAT; 11 | BRA; 9 | AUS; Ret | 6th | 133 |

=== Suzuka 8 Hours results ===
| Year | Team | Co-Rider | Bike | Pos |
|---|---|---|---|---|
| 1993 | (Japan) Itoham Racing Kawasaki | (New Zealand) Aaron Slight (United States) Scott Russell | Kawasaki Ninja ZX-7R | 1st |

=== AMA Superbike Championship ===
| Year | Class | Team | 1 | 2 | | 3 | | 4 | | 5 | | 6 | | 7 | 8 | | 9 | | 10 | | 11 | Pos | Pts |
| Year | Class | Team | R1 | R1 | R2 | R1 | R2 | R1 | R2 | R1 | R2 | R1 | R2 | R1 | R1 | R2 | R1 | R2 | R1 | R2 | R1 | Pos | Pts |
|---|---|---|---|---|---|---|---|---|---|---|---|---|---|---|---|---|---|---|---|---|---|---|---|
| 2008 | SuperBike | Suzuki | DAY; Ret | BAR | BAR | FON | FON | INF | INF | MIL | MIL | RAM | RAM | LAG | OHI | OHI | VIR | VIR | RAT | RAT | LAG | 44th | 0 |

| Preceded by Thomas Stevens | AMA Superbike Champion; 1992 | Succeeded by Doug Polen |
