= Peter Egan (columnist) =

American writer

Peter Egan is an American writer specializing in automotive and motorcycle journalism — widely known for his monthly car-related column, Side Glances, in Road & Track magazine as well as his monthly motorcycle-related column, Leanings, in Cycle World magazine — as well as road tests and occasional features in both magazines.

Egan's columns are chiefly autobiographical and anecdotal. He has written extensively about road trips, including detailed accounts of the failings of the vehicles, interactions with the people he travels with and those he meets.

Egan was described in a 2010 New York Times book review as one of America's 'standout auto writers'.

== Early life ==
Egan was born in St. Paul, Minnesota in 1948. He first became acquainted with sports cars from photographs of celebrities and their cars in his sister Barbara's glamour magazines. He would later watch sports car racing at Elkhart Lake, Wisconsin.

Egan went to school at the University of Wisconsin as a journalism major. During his junior year, he decided that he would rather pursue a medical degree. After being in the program for only a few weeks, Egan decided to leave college. He then enlisted with the US Army, entering basic training in March 1969, and eventually serving in Vietnam. Characteristically, he later described a Jeep he had that the Viet Cong hit with a mortar shell as "the only non-English vehicle I ever drove that exploded." After his tour of duty, he visited Paris, France, from which he and a friend toured on bicycles to Marseille.

In 1975, he joined the Sports Car Club of America, Blackhawk Valley Region, hoping "to participate in road racing and attend club social events with friends of mine who are now members."

== Motor journalism career ==
In the early 1980s, Egan wrote a freelance article about a motorcycling trip with his wife, which he submitted to Cycle World. When the article was published, editor Allan Girdler offered him a position as a staff writer. Egan accepted and he and Barb relocated to southern California.

While writing for Cycle World, Egan also wrote for the automotive magazine Road & Track, part of the same organization, and had its headquarters in the same building in Newport Beach. His writing style fit well with, and may have been influenced by, those of his contemporaries at Road & Track, including Henry N. Manney III, Rob Walker, Innes Ireland, and Dennis Simanaitis.

Apart from writing road tests and reports on motor races and car shows, Egan wrote about the perils and pitfalls of repairs, restoration, and racing, illustrating his points with first-hand anecdotes. His experience of working on and his love for English cars has led him to exaggerate their faults and idiosyncrasies, though he makes it clear he prefers to work on and drive them. He has also expressed a particular interest in old English and Italian motorcycles.

Egan has since retired from the regular staff of both magazines, although he still contributes monthly columns to both and also writes features as an editor-at-large. Egan and his wife returned to Wisconsin in the summer of 1990, moving to a farm near Cooksville where they still live.

== Awards ==
Egan won both the 2008 Motor Press Guild Dean Batchelor Award for Excellence in Automotive Journalism, and the 2008 International Motor Press Association Ken Purdy Award for an article published in April and May editions of Road & Track. He was a finalist for the Dean Batchelor Award again in 2012.

== Road trips ==
Peter Egan has documented several road trips, mostly in North America. These trips include:

- Riding a '64 Honda C100 from Madison, WI to Pikes Peak State Park, IA and back. In his book Leanings, Egan said of the 1978 303-mile trip, "In 15 years of riding and touring on all kinds of bikes, this was my favorite trip. It was a microcosm tour, measured in time rather than distance."
- Riding a bicycle from Paris to Marseilles in the early 1970s
- 2006 ride to the Gaspé Peninsula in Canada with Barb on a BMW R1200RT to recreate a late 1960s Gaspé effort with a riding pal on small displacement Hondas
- Driving with Chris Beebe from Wisconsin to Los Angeles in a Ford Model A, after he and Beebe restored the car ("Model A Odyssey, Parts I and II")
- Several trips from Wisconsin to the SCCA Runoffs at Road Atlanta and back
- Driving a BMW Isetta from Wisconsin to Memphis, Tennessee, after realizing that he would not be able to make it to Road Atlanta in time for the Runoffs
- Driving a Caterham 7 with his wife around New England
- Driving a Jaguar E-Type with his wife as far north as the map indicated the existence of pavement
- Driving a Mini in a rally across Texas
- Driving a '63 Cadillac down into the Mississippi Delta Blues Country

== Works ==
=== Books ===
- Peter Egan at Large. Brooklands Books, 1996. ISBN 978-1-85520-348-8
- Side Glances, Volume 1: 1983-1992. Brooklands Books Limited, 2001. ISBN 978-1-85520-566-6
- Side Glances, Volume 2: 1992-1997. Brooklands Books Limited, 2001. ISBN 978-1-85520-567-3
- Side Glances: The Best from America's Most Popular Automotive Writer. Brooklands Books Limited, 2006. ISBN 978-1-85520-728-8
- Leanings: The Best of Peter Egan from Cycle World Magazine. Motorbooks, 2009. ISBN 978-0-7603-3657-1
- Leanings 2: Great Stories by America's Favorite Motorcycle Writer. Motorbooks, 2010. ISBN 978-0-7603-3716-5
- Leanings 3: On the Road and in the Garage with Cycle World's Peter Egan. Motorbooks, 2014. ISBN 978-0-7603-4642-6
- The Best of Peter Egan: Four Decades of Motorcycle Tales and Musings from the Pages of Cycle World. Motorbooks, 2018. ISBN 978-0-7603-6379-9
- Landings in America: Two People, One Summer, and a Piper Cub. Octane Press, 2025. ISBN 978-1-64234-189-8
