= Racing line =

Term in motorsports

In motorsport, the racing line, or simply "the line," is the optimal path around a race course. In most cases, the line makes use of the entire width of the track to lengthen the radius of a turn: entering at the outside edge, touching the "apex"—a point on the inside edge—then exiting the turn by returning outside.

== Description ==
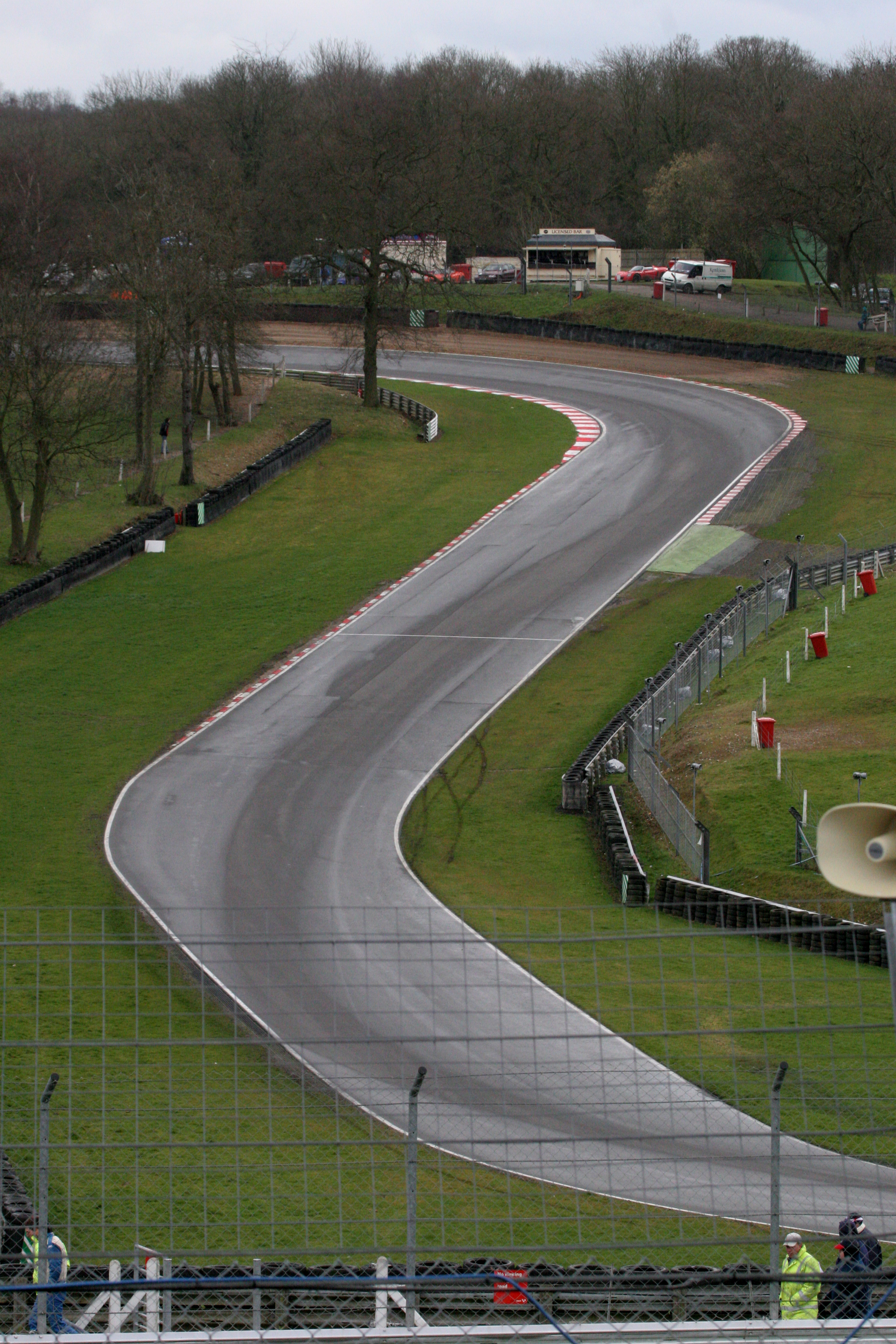
Tyre marks showing the line at Brands Hatch (2008).

Driving the racing line is a primary technique for minimizing the overall course time. As the optimal path around a race course, the racing line can often be glimpsed on the asphalt in the form of tire skid marks. A. J. Baime described its formation in the early laps of a race at Le Mans:

As the pack stretched out in single file—carving the black stripe into the pavement that was the racing line—the real competition began.

== Variations ==
In general, the optimal line into a corner of a race course is an arc of continuously changing radius. The line starts at the outside of the road and decreases in radius as the car decelerates towards a point on the inside (often involving trail braking). After clipping this point, the line increases in radius as the car accelerates, ending at the outside of the road. The clipping point is called the apex.

Several variations on this basic format exist, usually described by the relative location of the apex (i.e. whether it is an "early" or a "late" apex).

=== Late Apex ===
A late apex involves delaying the point where the car begins to turn, resulting in the car reaching the inside of the track later in the corner.

The goal of a late apex is to lengthen the radius on which the car turns on exit. The technique allows for greater speed when exiting the corner onto the straightaway, but requires slower speeds going in. Race driver Ross Bentley suggests as a rule of thumb: "The faster the corner, the closer to the geometric line you should drive" in order to maintain more speed through the turn. Conversely, "the slower the corner, the more you need to alter your line with a later apex." Doing so allows the driver to gear down for faster acceleration on the exit.

An early apex line, where the driver turns early into the curve, allows a faster entry but a slower exit. The practice is largely considered a beginner mistake.

=== Compound turns ===
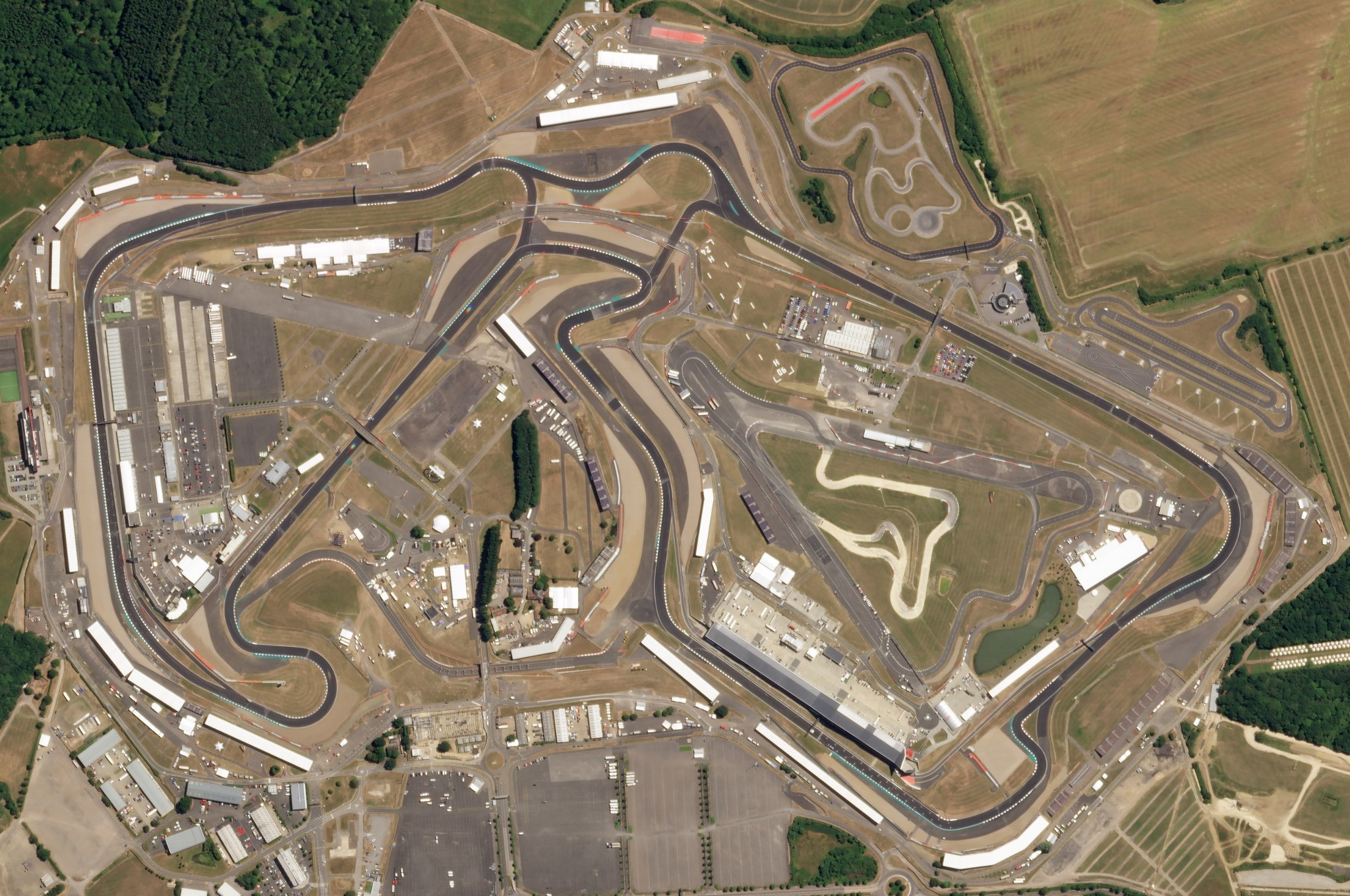
The Maggots and Becketts complex at Silverstone Circuit is an example of compound turns.

In some cases, corners occur in close succession, such that the exit of one rapidly transitions into the entry of the next. In such cases, a driver's goal is to exit the final corner onto the following straightaway at the maximum speed. To achieve this, the driver will "sacrifice the line" through the first turns in order to be in the optimal position for the last.

== Mathematical basis ==
The problem of exactly determining the optimal racing line through a given race course is mathematically non-trivial, and often computationally expensive. However, several general statements can still be made.

Racing line algorithms attempt to generate a curve that minimizes the time it takes for a car to travel through a racetrack. Three of the primary considerations of such algorithms are the average speed of the car along the line, the total curvature of the line, and the total distance. Maximizing speed - while minimizing curvature and distance - yields the ideal racing line. This is an example of an optimization problem.

Animation depicting how a point traverses a path of constantly decreasing radius. The resulting curve is an Euler spiral.

=== Euler spiral ===
One common solution to the racing line problem (in the case of an apex in the exact middle of the corner) is the Euler spiral, a curve with a radius that changes at a constant rate. In this solution, the car decelerates along a path of constantly decreasing radius towards the apex, and then accelerates along a path of constantly increasing radius after the apex.

However, the Euler spiral solution has been challenged as not always being the best solution, but simply one of the "close-to-best" solutions, which can usually be outperformed.
