= Yamaha Champions Riding School =

Motorcycle training program in New Jersey

Yamaha Champions Riding School is a motorcycle training program based primarily at New Jersey Motorsports Park in Millville, New Jersey. The school operates at race tracks all over the Continental United States. It is the successor to the now-defunct Freddie Spencer High Performance Riding School, and spent its first four years at Miller Motorsports Park. Yamaha Champions Riding School is often referred to as "YCRS" or "ChampSchool." Yamaha Champions Riding School teaches motorcycle control techniques to any rider, with the ultimate goal of promoting safer riding in any condition. The school uses race tracks to teach riders because they are controlled environments, feature repeatable corners, and lend themselves toward measurable improvement.

Joshua Siegel, investor and CCS club racer, is a financial sponsor and majority owner of Yamaha Champions Riding School. Minority owners include individuals from YCRS’s executive leadership: Nick Lenatsch, Chris Peris, Limore Shur, and Keith Culver.

== Philosophy ==
Yamaha Champions Riding School bases its curriculum on the question: "What are the best riders in the world doing to survive and thrive on two wheels?" The school's approach is founded on the idea that a motorcycle functions the same on a country road, parking lot, city street, or racetrack, and performs best when riders apply the habits, techniques, and inputs used by the expert riders who designed it. The program refers to these techniques as "Champions Habits". The school caters to riders of all levels and types—"any rider, on any bike, street or track"—and does not use a levels-based system. Instead, it emphasizes a "brilliance in the basics" approach, applicable to all riders, with the difference between a street rider and a professional racer lying in the degree of application.

== Staff ==
The program is led by Nick Ienatsch and former WSBK rider and current WERA Endurance National Champion Chris Peris. MotoAmerica Superbike racer and 2021 MotoAmerica King of the Baggers, Kyle Wyman and his brother, MotoAmerica racer Cody Wyman, are senior instructors at the school. Former AMA racer Ken Hill has also been associated with the school and is a guest instructor. The school often has guest instructors, such as Yamaha-sponsored MotoGP, World Superbike, and AMA racers. Racers like Bradley Smith, Colin Edwards, James Toseland, Josh Hayes, Roger Lee Hayden, and Ben Spies have all taught at the school. World Superbike and AMA Superbike Champion Scott Russell has also been a frequent guest instructor, and the school's 2016 instructor line-up included MotoAmerica champions J. D. Beach, Cameron Beaubier, and Garrett Gerloff.

The school's close partnership with Yamaha-US puts students on various Yamaha motorcycles and exposes them to Yamaha teams who occasionally test during the school. These tests allow students to get a first-hand glimpse at the machinery and processes of road racing teams in the United States.

== Programs ==
Yamaha Champions Riding School offers three programs, and while the school is sponsored by Yamaha (and Yamaha motorcycles are available for rent for the two-day ChampSchool), any make and model of motorcycle are welcome.

ChampSchool is the halo program for Yamaha Champions Riding School. ChampSchool, the only MSF Tier-3 school, is a two-day, immersive motorcycle riding curriculum designed for current riders of any skill level. With a 4:1 student-to-instructor ratio, the program offers individualized, tailored feedback throughout the two days a student is at the school.

The first day begins with demonstrations and discussions of braking, body position, traction/grip, and control manipulation before alternating between the track and the classroom for the majority of the day. While instructor-driven van laps demonstrate and explain a few techniques a few techniques, much of the day is spent on the race track, putting the classroom lessons to work. Topics covered on the first day include how speed relates to corner radius, braking, and cornering technique and the mindset of the best riders in the world. The second day of the school features topics such as ergonomics, suspension geometry, rear brake application, and visual techniques. Students are recorded throughout both days, and the film is reviewed in-class at the end of each day during a catered dinner. Students are offered two-up rides on day two, as well as the opportunity to ride a number of new Yamaha motorcycles and to conduct mini-drills at the end of the day.

ChampStreet is a one-day program designed specifically for street riders and utilizes street gear and street bikes. The curriculum is derived from the two-day ChampSchool program, but scaled down to a lower price point. While the ChampStreet course is often taught in conjunction with the two-day ChampSchool at race tracks, ChampStreet does not require race leathers, and race-prepped motorcycles are prohibited from attending. The curriculum is tailored specifically for street riding and covers street survival strategies, in addition to motorcycle control skills. Unlike most street-based courses, ChampStreet happens at highway speeds on racetracks and/or massive parking lots. ChampStreet covers topics like trail-braking, grip/traction, visual techniques, mid-corner stops, and more.

ChampGrad is a single-day program, designed for graduates of the two-day ChampSchool to return and focus on refining specific skills. ChampGrad has a 2:1 student-to-instructor ratio and offers data analysis, extra film laps, two-up rides, drills, and more time spent on the motorcycles.

== Champ U ==
In August 2021, Yamaha Champions Riding School expanded their program selection with an inexpensive, online version of the two-day ChampSchool class. "Champ U: The Core Curriculum" is an online-only school featuring 40 videos and quizzes, 30 drills, and forum access for direct communication with instructors and other students. It is accessible via the internet.

== Partnerships ==
Yamaha Champions Riding School has partnerships or close ties to the following organizations:

- United States Motorcycle Coaching Association
- N2 Trackdays
- TrackDaz
- TrackTime
- Xcel
- Utah Sport Bike Association
