= A. J. Baime =

American author, journalist, and public speaker (born 1971)

- Born: July 24, 1971 (age 55); New Jersey, U.S.
- Education: University of New Hampshire (BA); New York University (MA)
- Occupations: Author, journalist
- Spouse: Michelle Baime
- Children: 2

Albert James "A. J." Baime (born July 24, 1971) is an American author, journalist, and public speaker. He is a regular contributor to The Wall Street Journal, and he is best known for his books The Accidental President: Harry S. Truman and the Four Months that Changed the World (2017), Go Like Hell: Ford, Ferrari, and Their Battle for Speed and Glory at Le Mans (2009) and The Arsenal of Democracy: FDR, Detroit, and an Epic Quest to Arm an America at War (2014).

== Biography ==
Baime was born and raised in suburban New Jersey, where he attended West Essex High School. He earned a B.A. from the University of New Hampshire in 1994, and an M.A. from New York University in 1997. Soon after, he broke into journalism by working as a freelance fact checker at magazines such as GQ, Rolling Stone, and The Village Voice.

In 1998, Baime started his first full-time writing job, at Maxim magazine. Over the next 15 years, he worked at various publications, becoming an executive editor at Boston, Maxim, and Playboy magazines, respectively. During that time, he began writing for other publications, notably The Wall Street Journal, where he currently writes the weekly "My Ride" column, about people who have a passion for a specific kind of automobile or motorcycle.

Baime is known for his work as an automotive journalist; he is currently a contributing editor to Road & Track, and he was on the launch team of Time Inc.'s online car magazine The Drive.

A longtime New Yorker, Baime now lives in northern California, focusing mainly on his work as a book author. He is married to Michelle, has a son and a daughter and, as of 2023, drove a "humble" Subaru Outback.

== Writings ==
In 2003, Baime published his first book, Big Shots: the Men Behind the Booze. But his 2009 book Go Like Hell is the one that launched his career as an author. The book covers the Ford vs. Ferrari rivalry to win the 24 Hours of Le Mans in the 1960s. It was developed into the 2019 film Ford v. Ferrari, directed by James Mangold, with Christian Bale and Matt Damon in leading roles.

Baime's 2014 book The Arsenal of Democracy—about the Detroit car companies' contributions to World War II, notably the Ford Motor Company—is also in development for film. Both Go Like Hell and The Arsenal of Democracy won Ken W. Purdy Awards presented by the International Motor Press Association for excellence in automotive journalism.

== Film work ==
Baime has appeared on the TV shows Jay Leno's Garage and One of a Kind: Cars, and he is featured prominently in The 24 Hour War, a feature-length documentary film produced and directed by Adam Carolla and Nate Adams in 2016.

== Selected publications ==
- Big Shots: The Men Behind the Booze. New York: New American Library, 2003. ISBN 045120980X
- Go Like Hell: Ford, Ferrari, and Their Battle for Speed and Glory at Le Mans. Boston: Mariner Books, 2010. ISBN 9780547336053
- The Arsenal of Democracy: FDR, Detroit, and an Epic Quest to Arm an America at War. Boston: Mariner Books, Houghton Mifflin Harcourt, 2015, c2014. ISBN 0544483871
- The Accidental President: Harry S. Truman and the Four Months That Changed the World. Houghton Mifflin Harcourt, 2017. ISBN 0544617347
- Dewey Defeats Truman: The 1948 Election and the Battle for America's Soul. Houghton Mifflin Harcourt, 2020. ISBN 9781328585066
- White Lies: The Double Life of Walter F. White and America's Darkest Secret. Mariner Books, 2022 ISBN 978-0358447757
- Survival of the Fastest - Weed, Speed, and the 1980's Drug Scandal that Shocked the Sports World with Randy Lanier. Hachette Books, 2022. ISBN 978-0-306-82645-0
