= Utah Sport Bike Association =

Sport motorcycle club in Utah

Utah Sport Bike Association Advanced Rider Training

Utah Superbike, formally Utah Sport Bike Association is a not-for-profit sport motorcycle club, based out of Salt Lake City, Utah. Their primary focus is to promote safe, fun sport biking, primarily by educating sport motorcycle riders through rider education programs called ARTs (Advanced Rider Training) and by hosting the Masters of the Mountains (MoM) motorcycle roadracing series. Previous shorthand names included the UtahSBA and USBA. After a rebrand in 2025, Utah Superbike is also called UtahSBK.

== History ==
The club began in the late 1980s and its founders included Nick Ienatsch and Mitch Boehm. Ienatsch went on to become a prominent motorcycle journalist famous for authoring a popular motorcycle riding article titled 'The Pace' and a book titled Sport Riding Techniques. Ienatsch then went on to become the head instructor for Freddie Spencer's superbike school. Mitch Boehm went on to become the editor and chief of Motorcyclist magazine.

The club struggled for several years after the state's only race track, Bonneville Raceway, closed its doors. In 2006, the club enjoyed a large resurgence after Larry H. Miller built a 90-million dollar road race facility called Miller Motorsports Park in Tooele Utah.

The club has developed a very popular riding program, known as the ART (Advanced Rider Training) program. At its beginning, the ARTs (Then known as the ARS - Advanced Riding School) took place in parking lots and riders navigated a makeshift course laid out with cones. In 2001, the BlackRock go kart track was built in Tooele Utah, and the school relocated there. Beginning in the fall of 2005, Miller Motorsports Park became the location for the club's ARTs, and in 2006 the club became involved in promoting the Masters of the Mountains race series at the facility.

The association has three versions of their Advanced Rider Training program: the ST-ART (Sport Touring Advanced Rider Training) dedicated to riders of sport touring motorcycles, the Super-ART which takes place on the larger Miller Motorsports Park course, and the traditional ART that now takes place on the Super Kart track at Miller.

The Masters of the Mountains race series that the club promotes is held at and is co-promoted with Miller Motorsports Park and utilizes the various configurations of the track. In 2006, it was a five race series, and in 2007 seven race weekends were scheduled. Over $100,000 in purse and contingency money awards were available in the race series, contested by top racers from the Western U.S. and Canada, as well as local racers from Utah and Colorado.

Other club activities include operating a website and forum, monthly meetings, race-viewing gatherings and an annual banquet.
