= Ken Hill (motorcyclist) =

American motorcycle racer (born 1964)

- Born: June 27, 1964 (age 62)
- Occupations: Motorcycle road racer, riding instructor

Kenneth E. Hill (born June 27, 1964) is a former motorcycle road racer turned riding and racing coach. He is considered to be one of the top motorcycle coaches in the United States for his work with successful riders in the MotoAmerica AMA/FIM North American Road Racing Series. Hill coaches 2015 and 2018 MotoAmerica Supersport Champion J. D. Beach, and 2016 MotoAmerica race winners Valentin Debise and Cameron Petersen, as well as Daytona Anderson, Andy DiBrino, Hayden Gillim, Jake Lewis, Kyle Wyman, and Xavier Zayat. Other racers he has worked with in the past include Josh Herrin, Jayson Uribe, Elena Myers, and Martín Cárdenas.

== Career ==
Hill bought his first motorcycle, a 1993 Honda CBR600F2, at 30 years old. He started road racing in 1994, and made his AMA Pro Superbike debut in 2004, at the age of 41, finishing in the top ten. Throughout his career, he belonged to the AMA, AFM, and WERA racing organizations. Hill retired from racing in 2008 to coach full-time.

From 2003 to 2008, Hill taught at Freddie Spencer's High Performance Riding School and then the Yamaha Champions Riding School until 2015.

Hill owns a private coaching company through which he liaises with several track companies in California and the Pacific Northwest to provide classroom instruction at track days as well as training seminars for instructors. He also runs an off-road riding school.

Hill is partnered with Rickdiculous Racing, where he directs the riding program. Since its inception in 2015, he has also led the Rick Development Camp for aspiring championship racers, with support from Team Hammer M4 race team. Hill designed the RDC curriculum with input from former World Superbike and AMA Superbike Champion Scott Russell, who is also on the program's coaching staff.

== Approach to motorcycle coaching ==
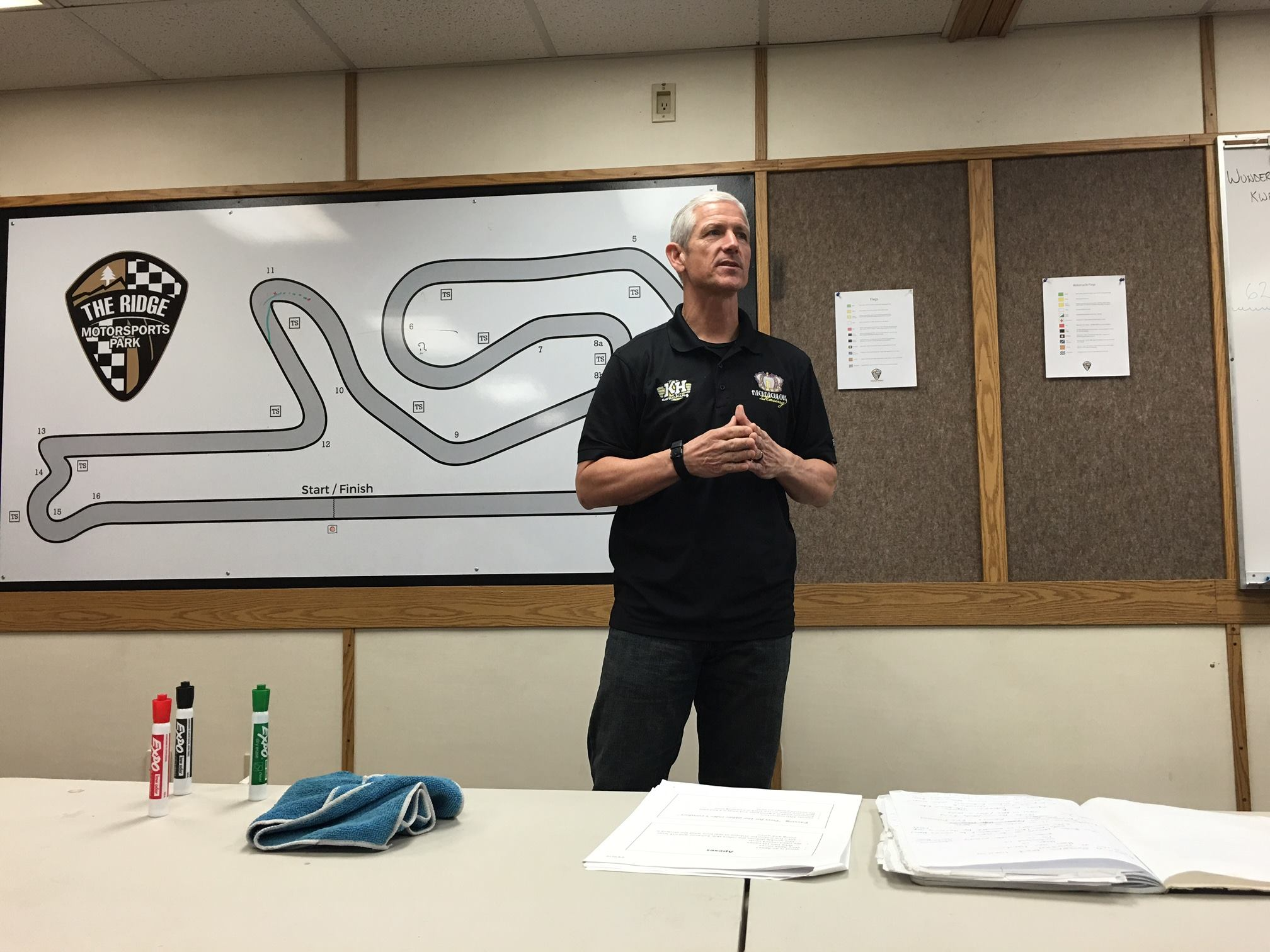

Hill is an advocate for establishing a culture of professional coaching in motorcycle road racing, which he has said lacks this tradition, unlike other high performance sports. He has expressed concern about the extent of misinformation and inexpert advice within both the racing and recreational motorcycle communities, which is particularly dangerous in a sport that involves such a high degree of physical risk. Accordingly, Hill has described his approach to coaching as “being able to see what the best in the world are doing, to be able to decode and understand, and to be able to pass it on to other riders.”

Hill defines the correct methodology for learning how to ride a motorcycle as the order of the sport, which comprises six training fundamentals taught in the following order: (1) eyes and focus, (2) motor controls, (3) bike placement, (4) brakes, (5) body position and body timing, and (6) turn-in point and turn-in rate. According to Hill, mastering the order of the sport requires training both on and off the bike. Developing a theoretical understanding of riding a motorcycle (i.e., the physics of how and why a motorcycle reacts to given inputs) facilitates the development of correct physical skills and handling.

== Personal life ==
Hill has been an avid cyclist since his youth. After picking out a bicycle for his twelfth birthday as a gift from his parents, he joined a local bike club and soon began participating in regional competitions. By 1977, Hill had qualified for national level racing in his age division. For the next three years, he competed in track and road racing, earning several podium places. Residing in Washington state, Hill continues to compete on bicycles in his spare time.

== Other ventures ==
Prior to his motorcycle racing career, Hill worked in the automotive service and parts industry for more than fifteen years. He also owned and operated a Kawasaki dealership in Hayward, California.

Hill worked as a race mechanic for several professional motorcycle road racing teams and riders including Josh Hayes, Tony Meiring, and Chris Ulrich. He was also a test rider for Buell Motorcycles, with which he partnered in 2009 for a track day series, and a test rider for Kawasaki Motorcycles.

In 2011, Hill collaborated with fellow YCRS instructor Nick Ienatsch to launch the subscription website FasterSafer.com.

Hill is a contributing writer for RoadRacing World and Cycle World magazines. He also publishes a podcast in which he discusses motorcycle riding techniques and best practices, shares his opinions about racing, and interviews special guests.

In 2014, Hill spoke at Yale University alongside Scott Russell, Nick Ienatsch, and Jamie Bestwick about motorcycle racing and achieving success.
