= Road & Track Speed Radio =

American weekly radio talk show

Road & Track Speed Radio is a weekly syndicated radio talk show, which deals with the automotive and motorsports world. It is hosted by Ed Justice, Jr. and airs each Saturday from 1:00 pm to 3:00 pm Pacific Time, and is distributed by Radio America.

== Format and Subject Matter ==
As the radio voice for Road & Track magazine, each week interviews with industry leaders from the automotive and motorsports world talk with Ed Justice, Jr. The latest trends, accessories, new cars, industry events, performance upgrades, cool electronics and aftermarket go-fast parts, editors, engineers, and manufacturers guests. The show delivers the latest product news and reviews in the automotive world, along with motorsports and the comprehensive editorial that is offered in Road & Track ’s monthly issues. ROAD & TRACK SPEED radio covers the automotive world from new cars, racing events, racing drivers, racing legends, automotive trends, alternative energy vehicles, industry events, performance upgrades and cool electronics. The second hour of the program features motorsports coverage and interviews with both its current stars and the legends of the past. The host, Ed Justice, Jr. brings over 40 years of experience in the automotive and motorsports field. Ed is the son of Ed Justice, Sr., one of the famous Justice Brothers. Growing up in this legendary family placed Ed in the middle of automotive and motorsports history, establishing friendships with the legends of the day. As President & CEO of the legendary Justice Brothers, Inc., Ed has worked closely with top named drivers and industry leaders in the automotive and racing world for all of his adult life. Each week Kevin Genus introduces Ed and the show is typically started with some current issue in the automotive world. Callers are sometimes asked to call and express their opinions. The show is broadcast LIVE each week from the Justice Brothers ‘Super Studio’ located on the legendary Route 66 in Southern California.

- Broadcast Area

ROAD & TRACK SPEED radio is broadcast on over 60 United States affiliates, several of which stream the show on their station's Web site. The show's is also streamed live at http://www.radioamerica.org for free. The show can also be found at Apple iTunes and numerous other podcast websites on the Internet. The previous weeks show can also be found at http://www.edjusticejr.com.

== Awards and recognition ==
- Winner of the Motor Press Guild Dean Batchelor 'Best of the Year' award - Ed Justice, Jr.
- Winner of the International Automotive Media Award of Excellence - Ed Justice, Jr.

== Contributors ==
REGULAR CONTRIBUTORS to ROAD & TRACK SPEED radio -

- David Miller - Motorsport Correspondent. David is a former editor of two major automotive magazines and a noted and respected member of the automotive media.
- Harry Hibler - Former racecar driver, drag racing legend, magazine publisher, and automotive industry icon.
- Dennis 'Lil Daddy' Roth - Monster Artist & Car Customizer

ROAD & TRACK MAGAZINE STAFF CONTRIBUTORS

- Matt DeLorenzo - Vice President, Editor-in-Chief
- Dennis Simanaitis - Engineering Editor
- Douglas Kott - Executive Editor
- Patrick Hong - Senior Technical Editor
- Mike Monticello - Feature Editor
- Shaun Bailey - Detroit Editor
- John Lamm - Editor-at-Large
- Joe Rusz - Editor-at-Large
- Thos L. Bryant - Editor Emeritus
- Sam Mitani - International Editor
- Jim Hall - Senior Editor
- Jonathan Elfalan - Road Test Editor
- Andrew Bornhop - Editor, R&T Specials

== Recent Guests ==
- Ashley Force Hood - Driver of the Castrol GTX AA/Funny Car talks about life in the 'Fast Lane'.
- Tom Madigan - Author of the new book, SNAKE vs. MONGOOSE - How a Drag Racing Rivalry changed the sport.
- Al Speyer - Executive Director of Firestone Racing explains what it takes to deliver the tires that the Indy 500 field runs on and why Firestone does it.
- Ken Gross - Author of ART OF THE HOT ROD talks about some of the legendary cars profiled in this great new book.
- Chad McQueen - Talks about teen driver safety and how it has become a passionate cause that is close to his heart.
- Rex White - The 1960 NASCAR Champion recalls his experiences from his long career.
- John Force & Robert Hight - The always entertaining world record Funny Car Champion & one of his team members talk about the 2009 season and the challenges they see.
- Matt DeLorenzo - Matt DeLorenzo, Editor in Chief of ROAD & TRACK, discusses the future of the magazine in the world of the Internet.
- Erik Arneson - Author of the new book Mickey Thompson: The Fast Life and Tragic Death of a Racing Legend. Erik talks about writing the complete history of Mickey Thompson, one of racing true innovators.
- Hillary Will - Driver of the KB Racing AA Top Fuel Dragster.
- Doug Freedman - Doug & his wife Gennie are the organizers of the 'Carmel - Concours on the Avenue'. The new & highly acclaimed concours in downtown Carmel. Their 2-day event kicks-off the automotive extravaganzas during the Pebble Beach/Monterey Peninsula week in August.
