= Cycle World =

US motorcycling magazine

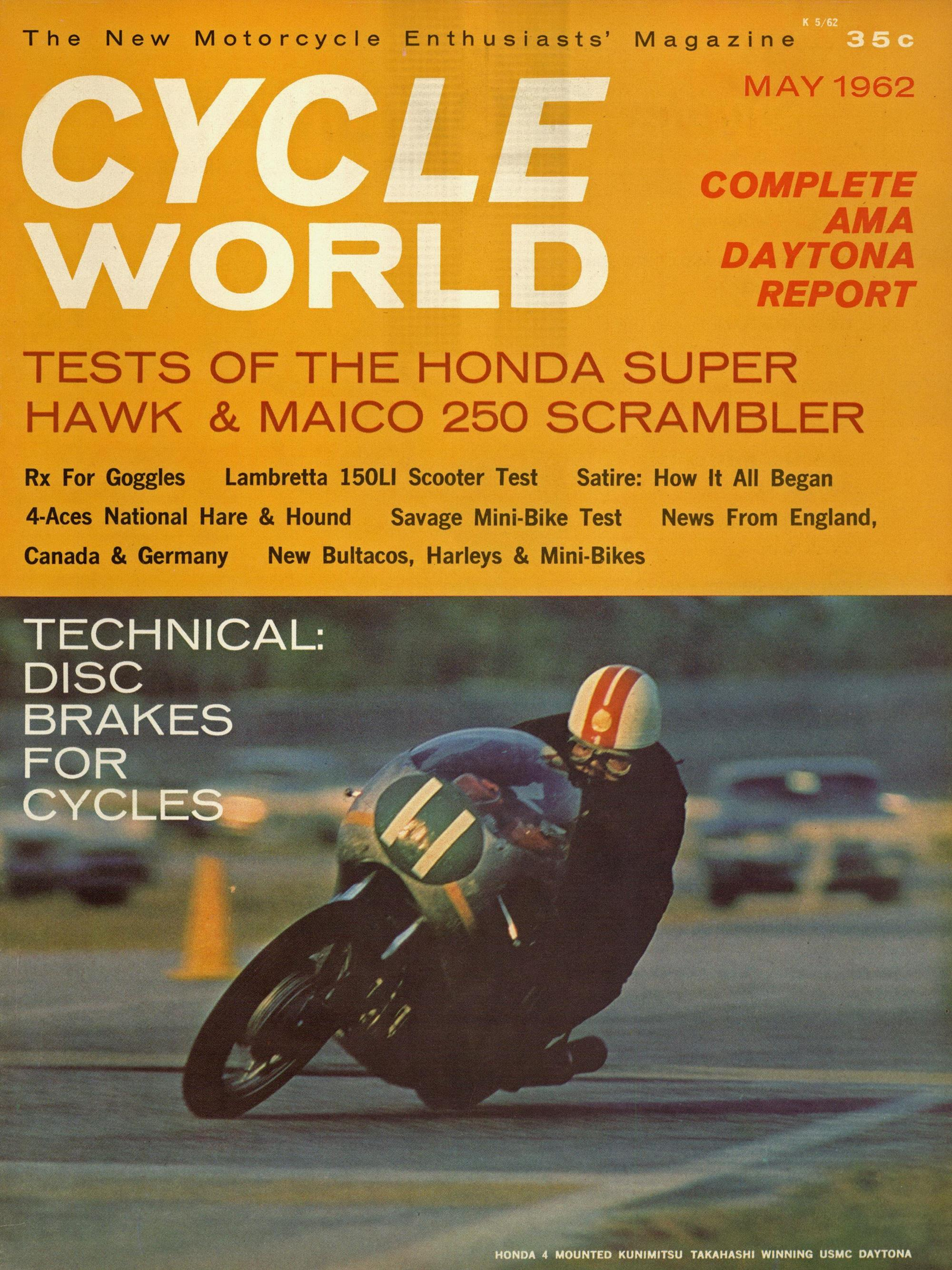
- Issue cover dated May 1962, featuring Kunimitsu Takahashi
- Editor-in-chief: Mark Hoyer (Since 2009)
- Former editors: David Edwards (1988–2009)
- Staff writers: Kevin Cameron, Peter Egan
- Photographer: Jeff Allen
- Categories: Motorcycling, motorcycle sport
- Frequency: Monthly
- Publisher: Eric Zinczenko
- Total circulation: 236,129 (December 2012)
- Founder: Joe Parkhurst
- First issue: January 1962; 64 years ago
- Final issue: October 2020; 5 years ago
- Company: Octane Media
- Country: US
- Based in: Irvine, California
- Language: English
- Website: cycleworld.com
- ISSN: 0011-4286
- OCLC: 560580975

Cycle World is a motorcycling magazine in the United States. It was founded in 1962 by Joe Parkhurst, who was inducted to the Motorcycle Hall of Fame as "the person responsible for bringing a new era of objective journalism" to the US. As of 2001 Cycle World was the largest motorcycling magazine in the world. The magazine is headquartered in Irvine, California. Regular contributors include Peter Egan and Nick Ienatsch. Previous or occasional contributors have included gonzo journalist and author Hunter S. Thompson, journalist and correspondent Henry N. Manney III, and professional riding coach Ken Hill.

== History ==
Parkhurst sold Cycle World to CBS in 1971. CBS executive Peter G. Diamandis and his associates bought CBS Magazines from CBS in 1987, forming Diamandis Communications, which was acquired by Hachette Magazines the following year, 1988. In 2011, Hachette sold the magazine to Hearst Corporation, which in turn sold Cycle World to Bonnier Corporation the same year. Bonnier also owned Sport Rider, a magazine that had "cover[ed] the sport bike market in the United States"; Bonnier shut it down in 2017 as part of a larger restructuring.

Octane Media acquired the title from Bonnier in 2020. October 2020 was the last print edition.

In July of 2026, Octane Media abruptly shuttered the magazine without announcing plans to restructure.
