= Bill Bagnall =

American magazine editor (1926–2006)

- Born: March 27, 1926; Taft, California
- Died: November 22, 2006 (aged 80)
- Occupations: Magazine editor and publisher
- Awards: Motorcycle Hall of Fame (1999)

Bill Bagnall (March 27, 1926 – November 22, 2006) was publisher of Motorcyclist magazine, and an editor of the magazine for 20 years (1952–1972).

== Biography ==
He served in the Philippines in the United States Army during World War II, after which he purchased a Norton ES2 motorcycle and became a photographer for Motorcyclist. This became a position as editor at the magazine working as associate editor for 90 days in 1950, then hired permanently in 1953. He sold Motorcyclist to Petersen Publishing in 1972 and retired in the early 1970s.

Bagnall was American Motorcyclist Association president for three years. In 1999, he was inducted to the AMA Motorcycle Hall of Fame.

From 1983 until 2011, Bagnall ran a popular photographic equipment swap meet in the Los Angeles area.
