= Elena Myers =

American motorcycle racer (born 1993)

Elena Myers Court
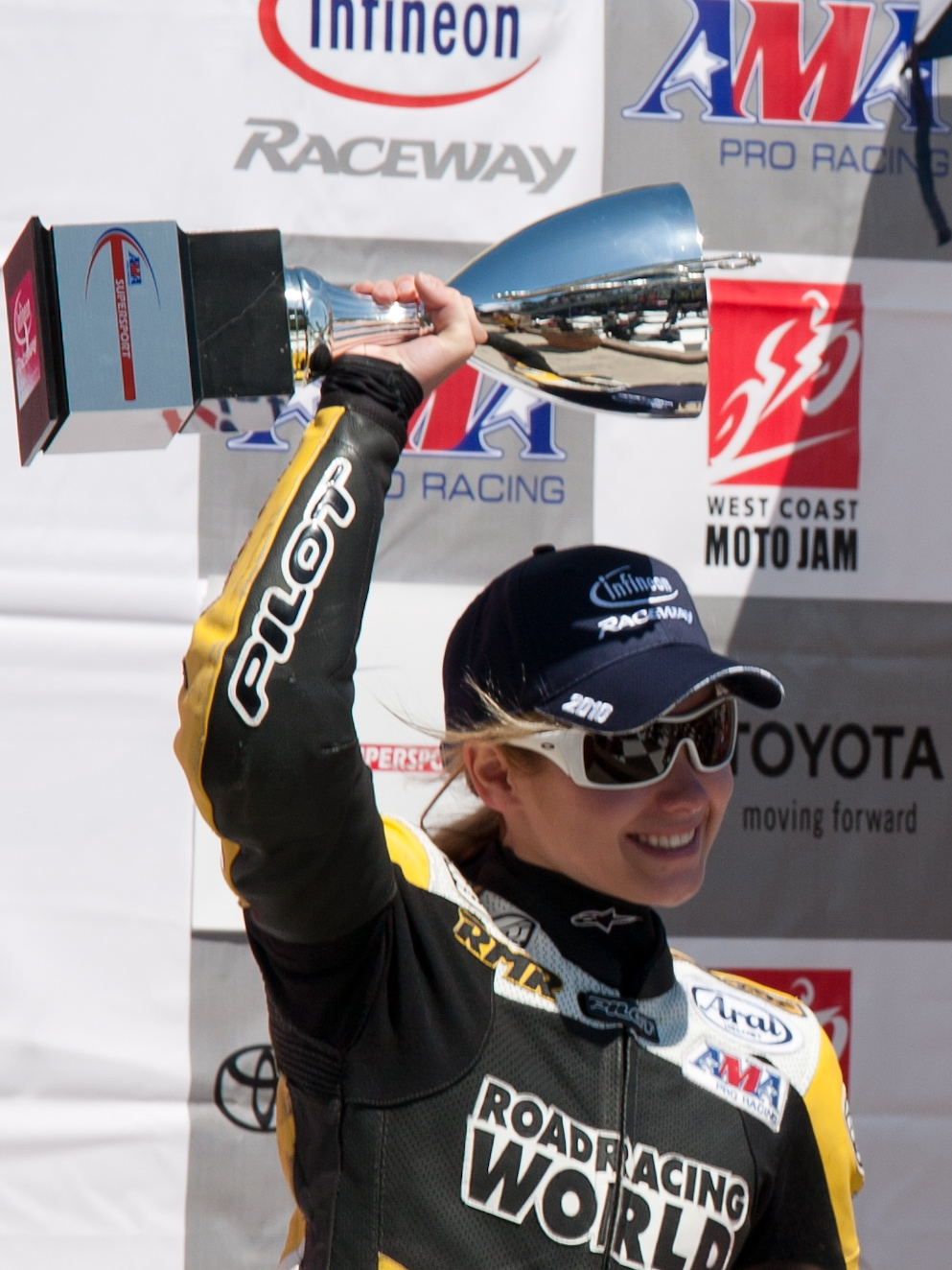
- Myers after a win at Sonoma Raceway in 2010
- Born: Elena Myers; November 21, 1993 (age 32); Mountain View, California, U.S.
- Spouse: Dean Court (m. 2016)
- Current team: Team21Motorsport
- Bike number: 21
- Website: elenamyers.com, archived from the original on May 21, 2015

Elena Myers Court (born November 21, 1993) is an American professional motorcycle racer. She made history in 2010 as the first female to win an AMA Pro Racing sprint road race. She is also the first woman to win a professional motorsports race of any kind at Daytona International Speedway, on March 17, 2012.

Myers is possibly the youngest female ever to enter the AMA racing circuit. In 2007, at age 13, she was under contract with Kawasaki Team Green three years before she was old enough to obtain a drivers license. She rode a Suzuki GSX-R1000 in the MotoAmerica Superbike Championship.

Myers filed a lawsuit against Loews Hotels in February 2017, alleging she was sexually assaulted by a masseur in Philadelphia in October 2014.

== Amateur racing ==
Myers began riding motorcycles at age eight, with the help and encouragement of her parents. She began with pocketbike racing before progressing to mini bikes and then to supermoto. At age 11 (2006), Myers raced on John Ulrich's Team Roadracing World in the United States Grand Prix Racers Union (USGPRU) National Series 125 cc (7.6 cu in) class and won her first race, riding a 1997 Honda RS125 GP. She then gained sponsorship assistance from Kawasaki and Road RacingWorld.com's "Kids: Don't Smoke!" program. She also had a sponsorship from Umbrella Girls USA, a modeling agency for paddock girls.

In 2008, riding a Kawasaki Ninja ZX-6R, Myers won a Western-Eastern Roadracers' Association (WERA) national race and had several podium finishes. When she was 11, John Ulrich promised to take Myers to Daytona International Speedway when she was 16, the minimum age to turn pro. As promised, she made her professional debut at Daytona on March 11, 2010.

== Professional career ==
Myers' first AMA Pro Racing victory came during Race 1, Round 4 of the 2010 season of the AMA Supersport Championship (AMA Supersport West series) at Infineon Raceway in Sonoma, California, on May 15, 2010. On lap 10 of 18 scheduled laps, the race was called after being red flagged twice due to crashes, securing first place for Myers. The race was not allowed to run its full distance because cleaning up the track and restarting would have put the day's program too far behind schedule. Myers described the time between the first and second red flags by saying, "I got a good restart off the front row and made some moves. I felt like I was getting a little bit closer to the leader with about eight or nine laps to go. I came around the next lap and the red flag was shown again." (The AMA Supersport West series is limited to riders ages 16–21 riding close to stock 600 cc (37 cu in) displacement sport bikes).

Myers achieved her second professional career win at Daytona International Speedway in SuperSport Race 2, on March 17, 2012. She won the race by .240 seconds, coming in first among a group of four closely packed riders on the final lap. After the race, Myers said, "It was a phenomenal race. I stayed up there and led a little bit, then stayed behind just to see how much I could be behind and still catch up. Everyone's bikes were really fast but mine was too.

For 2014, Myers rode an Apex Manufacturing/Sportbike Tracktime/Castrol backed Triumph Daytona 675R in the AMA Pro GoPro Daytona SportBike class.

Elena Myers does weightlifting and cardio training at the gym, and travels around the U.S. to races.

Her father was her coach and mechanic in the early years, but now has a reduced role. "I look forward to showing up and just watching from the stands," he said. Currently, Myers gets advice from AMA Motorcycle Hall of Fame inductee Jimmy Filice, and racer Chris Ulrich of Team RoadRacing World is a mentor. She has also been coached by former AMA racer Ken Hill and received instruction from Jason Pridmore's STAR Motorcycle School. Team owners are Richie Morris and John Ulrich.

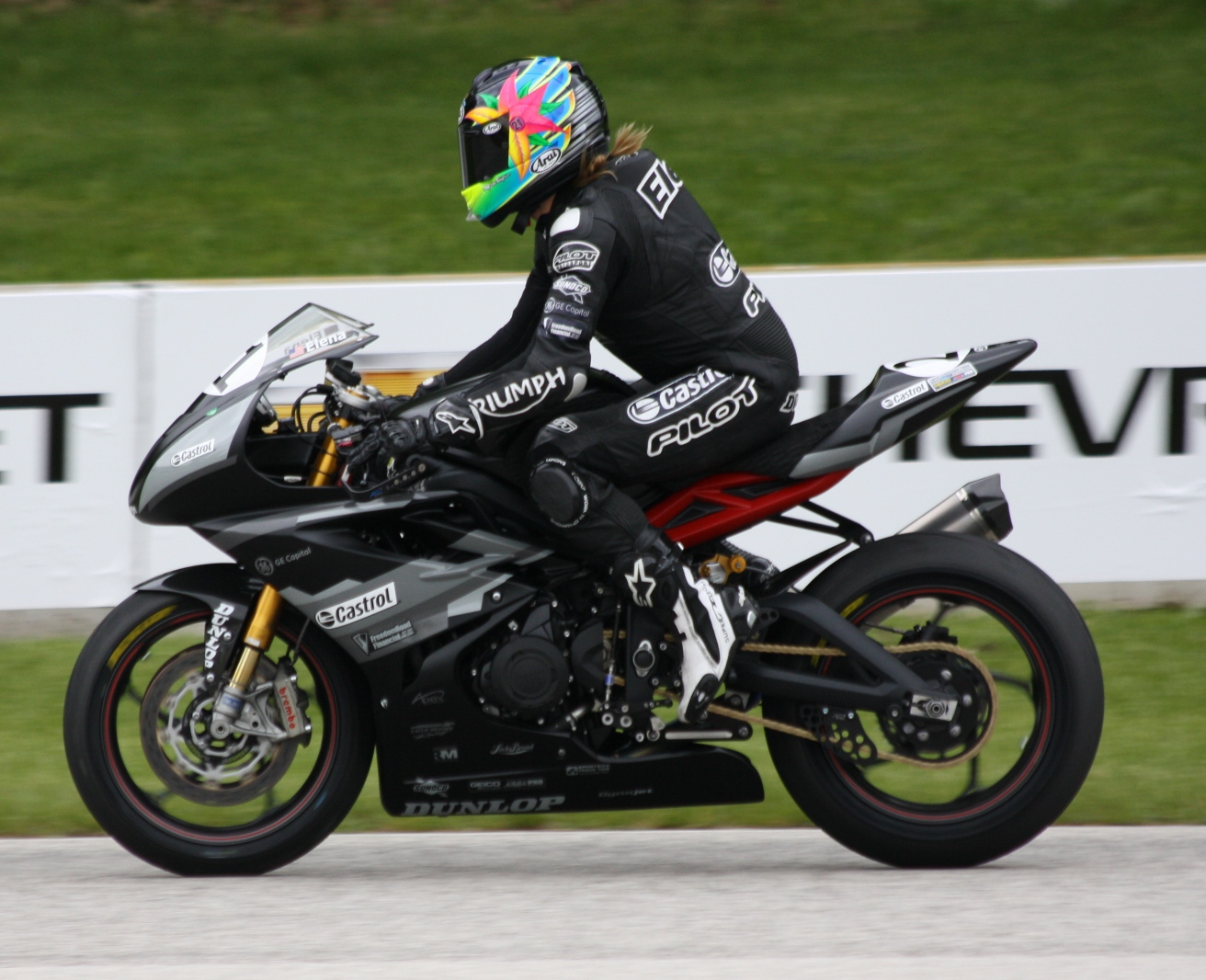
Myers racing on her AMA Sportbike at Road America in 2013

In 2010, Myers had several more sponsors, including Pirelli. Myers' family realized that being female helped her get noticed. Some of the advertisements created by her sponsors Kawasaki and Pirelli emphasize her youth and gender to draw attention. Suzuki colored their home page pink in honor of her victory riding their GSX-R600 motorcycle.

Myers, at 5 feet 3 inches (1.60 m) tall and weighing 116 lb (53 kg), is aware of the perception that women lack the upper body strength for 600-class motorcycles with minimum weights of 365–385 lb (166–175 kg), says that, "it's more of a mental game." Virginia Meyers, Elena's grandmother, was worried about the risks but was reassured after seeing her ride. She had crashed several times as of 2007, the worst injury up to then being a broken finger. In a 2008 crash, she was pinned under her bike, and suffered burns, a concussion, and a lacerated spleen. Of that crash, she said, "I wanted to go out and train so much. They told me to wait six weeks, and I waited three." On the morning of her victory at Infineon Raceway, she had taken shots of cortisone and Lidocaine for foot pain. Her parents, aware of the risks, won't allow her to go too far, while still pursuing her goals, explains her mother, Anita Myers, "she's very well balanced and just trying to take advantage of the opportunities that she has."

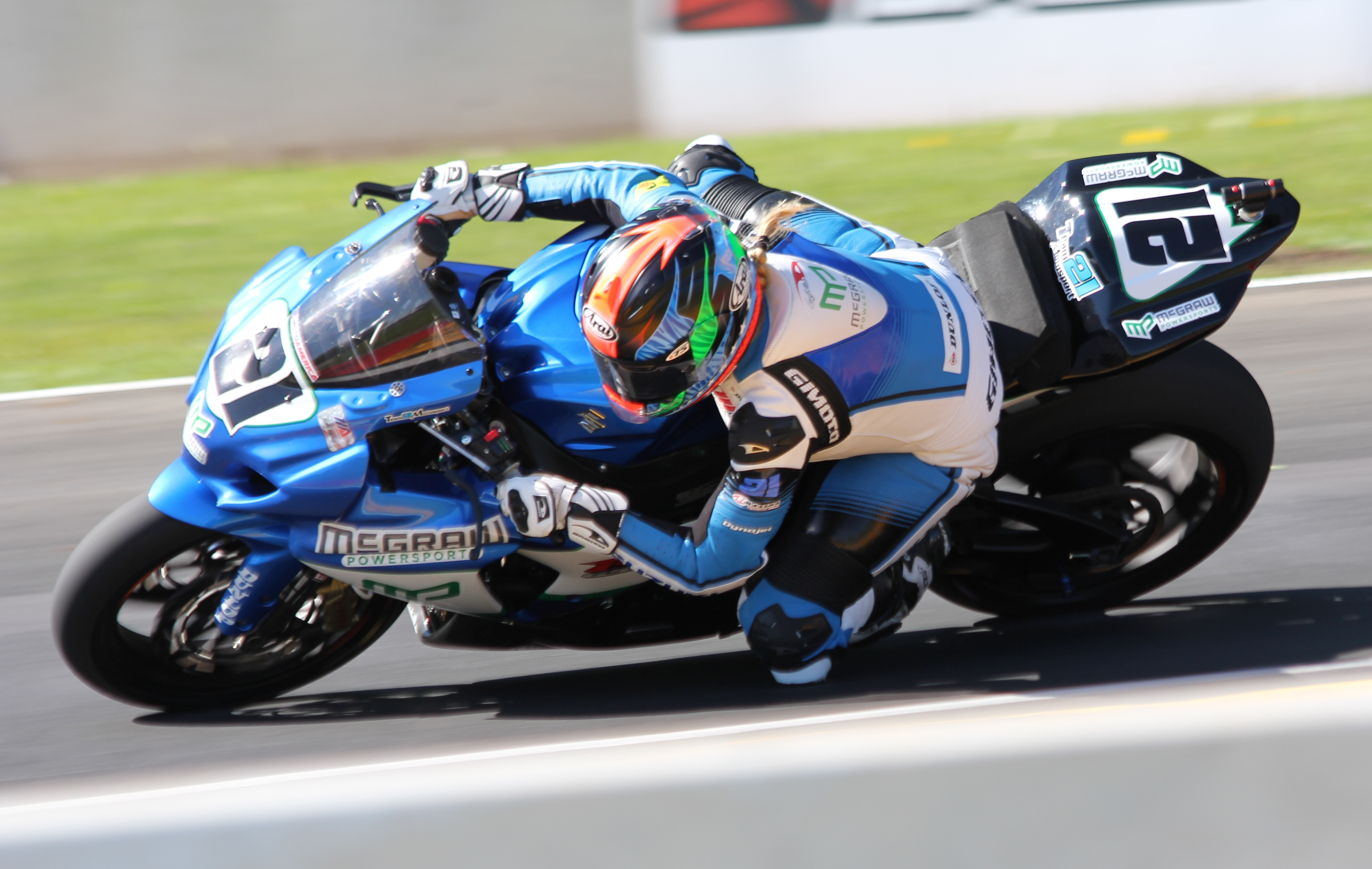
Myers racing her family team's MotoAmerica Superbike at Road America, 2015.

Myers has stated that her long-term goals are to graduate to the AMA Daytona Sportbike Championship class, which would normally be the result of winning the AMA Pro SuperSport Championship. In the longer term she has her sights on the premier motorcycling class, MotoGP. Kawasaki's senior media relations coordinator Jeff Herzog said in 2007, "I think she's the fastest female road racer in (the United States), and she hasn't had a chance to stretch her wings yet."

== Personal life ==
Myers graduated from high school on February 11, 2011. During high school, she was a straight A student. She took independent studies through California's Liberty High School District at Independence High School in Brentwood, California. While still in school, Myers said that not going to a traditional high school meant that, "I miss out on dances and stuff, but who cares about that — I race motorcycles!"

Myers lives in Discovery Bay, California, and trains at the Stockton Motorplex, where she first began on pocket bikes, at the San Joaquin County Fairgrounds, which is managed by her father Matt, a former amateur motorcycle racer who ran the Stockton Mini Road Racing Club.

In November, 2015, Myers announced she was engaged to British motorcycle racer Dean Court. They were married in January 2016, she taking the married name Elena Myers Court.
