= Servicemembers' Group Life Insurance =

American life insurance program

Servicemembers' Group Life Insurance (SGLI) is a life insurance program available to all active duty and reserve members of the uniformed services of the United States. Supervised by the United States Department of Veterans Affairs, the program is administered by the Prudential Insurance Company of America.

It is available to active-duty members of the Army, Marine Corps, Navy, Air Force, Space Force, Coast Guard, United States Public Health Service Commissioned Corps, and the National Oceanic and Atmospheric Administration Commissioned Corps. Ready reservists, cadets, and midshipmen at the four service academies (but not the Merchant Marine Academy), and members of the Reserve Officer Training Corps are also all eligible.

Insurance is available in increments of $50,000, up to a maximum of $500,000. Premiums are set at $0.05 per month per $1,000 of insurance, regardless of the member's age. An additional $1 per month is charged for traumatic injury protection (TSGLI). Accordingly, a $500,000 policy costs $26 per month. Notably unlike many other life insurance policies, the SGLI does not have a war clause exclusion which otherwise precludes benefits if death results from combat.

Veterans' Group Life Insurance (VGLI) is a similar product available to veterans. SGLI policyholders may convert their policy to VGLI upon discharge unless an exception for total disability applies. Premiums for VGLI are higher and are based on the age of the insured.

== US military life insurance lawsuit ==
In 2010, various media outlets noted allegations that the Prudential Life Insurance Company was manipulating the payout of life insurance benefits due to the families of American service members to gain extra profits. The company provided life insurance to people in the armed forces under a government contract. Rather than paying the full amount due to the families at once, the company would instead deposit the funds into a Prudential corporate account. These accounts are referred to as 'retained asset accounts' and are essentially an I.O.U. from the company to the payee (in many cases a fallen service members' family). While in early 2010 Prudential was making profits of up to 4.2% in its general account, they paid out 0.5% interest in these non-FDIC insured "Alliance" accounts. In some cases, when families requested to be sent a full payout in the form of a check, the family was sent a checkbook, rather than the amount due.

It is not clear if the practice violated the law or the contract. In August 2010, the company was sued by some bereaved families. The company's response included an open letter to the military community in which it addressed what it characterized as "misinformation" about the nature of the accounts. Military Times noted that prior lawsuits against insurance companies pertaining to the use of retained asset accounts have been dismissed in federal courts without action.

== Alternatives ==
Insurance coverage similar to SGLI is replicated by a few other private organizations. These include the Military Benefit Association (MBA), the United Services Automobile Association (USAA), the Army and Air Force Mutual Aid Association (AAFMAA), the Uniformed Services Benefit Association (USBA), the Armed Services Mutual Benefit Association (ASMBA), and the Navy Mutual Aid Association (NMAA). These organizations provide insurance for members of the armed forces, sometimes with similar or higher coverage levels at rates that are similar to or lower than SGLI. Like SGLI, the coverage provided is unique in that it is tailored to the needs of military members, and do not have war clause exclusions.
