= 2010 AMA Pro Supersport Championship =

2010 AMA Supersport Championship

Seasons
- ← 2009 2011 →

The 2010 AMA Pro Supersport Championship was the second running of the AMA Supersport Championship. Title sponsors for the series include Sunoco, Amsoil, National Guard, Dunlop, Speedcom and SunTrust. Tyler O'Hara became Top Gun champion in a final round shootout, in which the champion was decided through points amassed at Barber Motorsports Park only. Despite not winning a race all season, Austin Dehaven claimed the Young Gun championship.

== Calendar ==
2010 Calendar
Round	Circuit	Date	Pole position	Fastest lap	Race 1 Winner	Race 2 Winner
1	(Florida) Daytona International Speedway	March 3–5	Joey Pascarella	Joey Pascarella	Cameron Beaubier	Joey Pascarella
2	(California) Auto Club Speedway	March 26–28	Joey Pascarella	Joey Pascarella	Joey Pascarella	Joey Pascarella
3	(Georgia (U.S. state)) Road Atlanta	April 16–18	Joey Pascarella	J. D. Beach	J. D. Beach	J. D. Beach
4	(California) Infineon Raceway	May 14–16	Cameron Beaubier	Cameron Beaubier	Elena Myers	Cameron Beaubier
5	(Wisconsin) Road America	June 4–6	Cameron Beaubier	J. D. Beach	J. D. Beach	Huntley Nash
6	Mid-Ohio Sports Car Course	July 16–18	J. D. Beach	J. D. Beach	J. D. Beach	J. D. Beach
7	(California) Mazda Raceway Laguna Seca	July 23–25	Tomas Puerta	Tyler O'Hara	Huntley Nash	no Race 2
8	Virginia International Raceway	August 13–15	J. D. Beach	J. D. Beach	J. D. Beach	J. D. Beach
9	New Jersey Motorsports Park	September 3–5	Joey Pascarella	Joey Pascarella	Joey Pascarella	James Rispoli
10	(Alabama) Barber Motorsports Park	September 24–26	J. D. Beach	Huntley Nash	Huntley Nash	J. D. Beach

== Entry list ==
2010 Entry List (28)
Team	Bike	No	Riders
Top Gun	Suzuki GSX-R600	6	(United States) Chris Sromalla
Top Gun	Suzuki GSX-R600	45	(United States) Antoine Richards
Top Gun	Suzuki GSX-R600	144	(United States) Luiz Cerciari
Top Gun	Suzuki GSX-R600	528	(United States) Jose Flores
Top Gun	Yamaha YZF-R6		
Top Gun	Yamaha YZF-R6	44	(United States) Sam Nash
Top Gun	Yamaha YZF-R6	52	(United States) Michael Corbino
Top Gun	Yamaha YZF-R6	128	(United States) Rick Breen
Top Gun	Yamaha YZF-R6	185	(United States) Michael Corbino
Top Gun	Yamaha YZF-R6	274	(United States) Brian Brewer
Top Gun	Honda CBR600RR	414	(United States) Charles Burton, IV
Thomas Puerta	Yamaha YZF-R6	12	(Colombia) Thomas Puerta
Rockwall Performance	Yamaha YZF-R6	16	(California) Cameron Beaubier
Rockwall Performance	Yamaha YZF-R6	73	(Kentucky) J. D. Beach
Scott Gilbert Racing	Yamaha YZF-R6	19	(United States) Scott Gilbert
Elena Myers Racing	Suzuki GSX-R600	21	(California) Elena Myers
Vittorio Fabregas	Kawasaki ZX-6R	23	(United States) Vittorio Fabregas
Joey Pascarella	Yamaha YZF-R6	25	(California) Joey Pascarella
Ryan Kerr	Kawasaki ZX-6R	28	(Ohio) Ryan Kerr
Jake Gagne	Yamaha YZF-R6	32	(California) Jake Gagne
Robert Tinagero	Kawasaki ZX-6R	34	(California) Robert Tinagero
Austin DeHaven	Yamaha YZF-R6	56	(California) Austin DeHaven
Ryan Conrad Racing	Yamaha YZF-R6	59	(Florida) Ryan Conrad
Brock Terrell Racing	Yamaha YZF-R6	62	(Michigan) Brock Terrell
Hunter Propst Racing	Suzuki GSX-R600	71	(Florida) Hunter Propst
Huntley Nash	Yamaha YZF-R6	75	(Georgia (U.S. state)) Huntley Nash
Eric Stump Racing	Honda CBR600RR	77	(Pennsylvania) Eric Stump II
RoadRacingWorld.com	Suzuki GSX-R600	82	(Venezuela) Daniel Guevara
Giuseppe Messina, JR	Kawasaki ZX-6R	240	(United States) Giuseppe Messina
Charlie Long Racing	Suzuki GSX-R600	314	(United States) Charlie Long

Key
Regular Rider
Wildcard Rider
Replacement Rider

== See also ==
- 2010 AMA Pro American Superbike Championship
- 2010 AMA Pro Daytona Sportbike Championship
