= Ken Purdy =

- Born: 28 April 1913; Chicago, Illinois, US
- Died: 7 June 1972 (aged 59); Wilton, Connecticut, US
- Occupations: Writer and editor

Kenneth William Purdy (April 28, 1913 – June 7, 1972) was an American automotive writer and editor.

He was born in Chicago, Illinois in 1913, and raised mostly in Auburn, New York, by his mother after his father, songwriter William Thomas Purdy (On, Wisconsin!) died when Ken was only six. Ken graduated in 1934 from the University of Wisconsin–Madison. Soon after he got his first newspaper job with the Athol, Massachusetts Daily News. From there he went to Oshkosh, Wisconsin, to the Chicago Radio Guide, to associate editor of Look, and to the United States Office of War Information as editor of Victory during World War II. He was an editor at Parade, Car and Driver, Argosy and True magazines between the late '40s and mid '50s. He wrote articles and fiction under the pseudonym Karl Prentiss.

Purdy's main interests were automobiles and the people who drove them. Among other works, he produced 35 short stories and scores of automotive pieces for Playboy. He won Playboy's annual writers' award three times. His Kings of the Road, published in 1952, is still a landmark.

Purdy died of a self-inflicted gunshot wound on June 7, 1972, in Wilton, Connecticut.

The International Motor Press Association presents the annual Ken W. Purdy Award to a writer for an outstanding body of work or a specific piece of work that deals with the automotive world.
