= Uniformed Services Benefit Association =

U.S. nonprofit organization

- Company type: nonprofit organization
- Industry: Insurance; Financial services
- Founded: 1959
- Headquarters: Overland Park, Kansas
- Products: Life insurance Cancer care insurance Hospital indemnity insurance TRICARE & CHAMPVA supplemental insurance plans
- Website: www.usba.com

The Uniformed Services Benefit Association (USBA) is a nonprofit organization headquartered in Overland Park, Kansas, providing affordable group life insurance plans and other financial services specifically designed for active duty and retired military members and their families, as well as honorably discharged veterans, National Guard and Reserve members, and federal civilian employees.

== History ==
USBA was founded in 1959 to meet the needs of active duty military personnel, who at that time wanted to supplement their SGLI $10,000 benefit and had difficulty finding adequate life insurance coverage that would cover combat-related deaths. USBA was one of the first to eliminate the so-called “war clause” from all of its coverage.

Over the years USBA expanded to offer those same insurance products and services to active reserves, National Guard, Federal Employees, honorably discharged veterans, and others.

== Board of directors ==
USBA is governed by a Board of Directors elected annually by the membership. The Board is composed of active and retired military members and Federal employees. Board members typically serve a three year term.

The Board of Directors meets semi-annually at USBA headquarters (Fall and Spring). The Board's duties are performed on a voluntary basis. Board members do not receive a salary.

== Member eligibility ==
USBA membership is open to active duty servicemembers, retired military, honorably discharged veterans, National Guard and Reserve members, federal civilian employees and their families. There are no membership dues.

== Lines of business ==
Life insurance

USBA offers group term life, whole life and blended life insurance plans underwritten by New York Life Insurance Company which has the highest financial strength ratings possible from all four major independent credit rating agencies: Standard and Poor's (AA+), Moody's Investors Service (Aaa), Fitch Ratings (AAA) and A. M. Best (A++). USBA's group life insurance plans are often used to supplement Servicemembers' Group Life Insurance (SGLI), or to replace SGLI benefits lost after separating from the military, instead of Veterans Group Life Insurance (VGLI).

TRICARE and CHAMPVA Supplemental Insurance Plans

USBA offers the following supplemental insurance plans which help cover out-of-pocket expenses such as cost shares and copayments.

- TRICARE Standard/Extra Supplement
- TRICARE Reserve Select Supplement
- CHAMPVA Supplement

Plans are administered by Association & Society Insurance Corporation (ASI) and underwritten by Monumental Life Insurance Company (Cedar Rapids, IA), Transamerica Financial Life Insurance Company, Harrison, NY, Transamerica companies.

Cancer Care Insurance

USBA's Cancer Care insurance, underwritten by Monumental Life Insurance Company (Cedar Rapids, Iowa), helps protect against the high cost of cancer treatment by covering expenses like hospital confinement, radiation and chemotherapy, ambulance rides, transportation, extended care facilities and more.

Hospital Indemnity Insurance

USBA's Hospital Indemnity insurance offers guaranteed acceptance for eligible members and pays tax free (according to current IRS rulings) benefits to cover hospital and doctor bills, as well as regular bills that pile up during a hospital stay.

== Affinity Partners and Special Member Benefits ==
USBA members have access to additional special offers from Affinity Partners such as group auto insurance discounts from MetLife Auto & Home, ID Theft Assist, Emergency Assistance Plus (EA+) travel emergency assistance services, Life Line Screening, Hertz rental car discounts, and Long Term Care Insurance.

USBA provides a free online Military Jobs Resource Center for its members and non-members to assist military personnel with their transition from the service into civilian jobs. Transitioners can search for job openings, find transition advice, and get resume assistance from the nation's largest military placement agency, Orion International, and download helpful job search white papers.
