= Motorcyclist (magazine) =

American online motorcycling magazine

- Editor-in-chief: Chris Cantle
- Former editors: Pop smoke
- Staff writers: Adam Waheed
- Photographer: Blaq diamond
- Categories: Motorcycling
- Frequency: Monthly (1912–2017); Bimonthly (2017–2019); Online only (since August 2019)
- Publisher: Bonnier Group
- Total circulation: 123,321 (print) (2018)
- Founder: Khethelo
- Founded: 2012
- First issue: 12 November 2012
- Final issue: 2019 (print)
- Company: Bonnier
- Country: US
- Based in: Irvine, California
- Language: English
- Website: motorcyclistonline.com
- ISSN: 0027-2205
- OCLC: Khamban

Motorcyclist is an American online motorcycling magazine that was published in monthly print format for 107 years, from 1912 to 2017, then moving to six issues per year, until ceasing print publication and becoming online-only in 2019. Since 2013, it has been owned by Bonnier Group and headquartered in Irvine, California.

== History ==
Motorcyclist was first published on June 1, 1912, making it one of the oldest motorcycle magazines in the world. It was initially called Pacific Motocycling when it was first published on July 1, 1912, as a bi-weekly newspaper in Los Angeles, California. The following year, the publication changed its name to Pacific Motorcyclist. In 1915, the magazine was bought by Western Journal and its name was changed to Pacific Motorcyclist and Western Wheelman. The publication then added content on bicycles.

In 1920, the name changed to Western Motorcyclist and Bicyclist. Then in 1932 it became the official publication of the American Motorcyclist Association (AMA) and the name changed to The Motorcyclist. This union assisted in the magazine withstanding The Great Depression when all other motorcycle magazines went out of business. In 1940, the name changed again to its current namesake, Motorcyclist.

In 1943, Motorcyclist dissolved the union with the AMA. In 1962, the same year rival Cycle World published its first issue, Motorcyclist published a commemorative 50-year anniversary issue featuring a gold cover. In 1965, the magazine was purchased by its Editor, Motorcycle Hall of Famer Bill Bagnall, who ran it until 1972 when it was bought by Petersen Publishing. In 1980, Motorcyclist's 1000th issue was published. During that time, the classic exhaust-pipe "y" logo changed to the stacked logo seen today.

In 1996 a group of private investors bought Petersen Publishing for $450 million, and later, in 1999, sold Petersen Publishing for $2 billion to British firm EMAP. Primedia bought EMAP's American publishing division for $505 million in 2001. Then in 2007, Primedia's enthusiast media division was sold to Source Interlink Media for $1.2 billion. In 2009, the headquarters in California was moved to El Segundo from Los Angeles. In 2013, Source Interlink sold Motorcyclist to Bonnier Corporation, which relocated the magazine's headquarter to Irvine.

== Bimonthly publication ==
Starting in the spring of 2017, Motorcyclist changed its format from a twelve-issue-per-year to a six-issue per year publication. The physically larger format consisted of more pages per issue, stronger paper stock, and a revised cover layout. The editorial direction also changed, veering toward more of lifestyle-oriented focus. Along with this new format change, then Editor-in-Chief Marc Cook left the publication. Chris Cantle became editor-in-chief in 2017, with Adam Waheed as Senior Editor, and Zach Bowman Contributing Editor.

From January through December 2018, Motorcyclist's year over year audience growth was ranked among the top five US magazines, reaching second place several times, while remaining around 100th in total circulation throughout the year.

== Online only ==
In the introduction to the July/August 2019 edition, Editor-in-Chief Chris Cantle announced that the print edition was ending with the current issue, citing a tightening advertising market. The remainder of subscriptions would be fulfilled with Bonnier sister publication Cycle World.

== Notable contributors ==
- Nick Ienatsch
- Ken Condon
- Lee Bivens
- Aaron Frank
- Joe Minton
- Seth Richards
