= Road & Track =

American automotive enthusiast magazine

- Cover of the February–March 2024 issue
- Editor-in-Chief: Dan Pund
- Categories: Automotive
- Frequency: 6 issues per year
- Publisher: Hearst Magazines
- Total circulation: 111,001 (2024)
- First issue: June 1947
- Company: Hearst Magazines
- Country: United States
- Based in: New York City
- Language: English
- Website: www.roadandtrack.com
- ISSN: 0035-7189

Road & Track (stylized as R&T) is an American automotive enthusiast magazine first published 1947. It is owned by Hearst Magazines and is published six times per year. The editorial offices are located in New York City.

== History ==
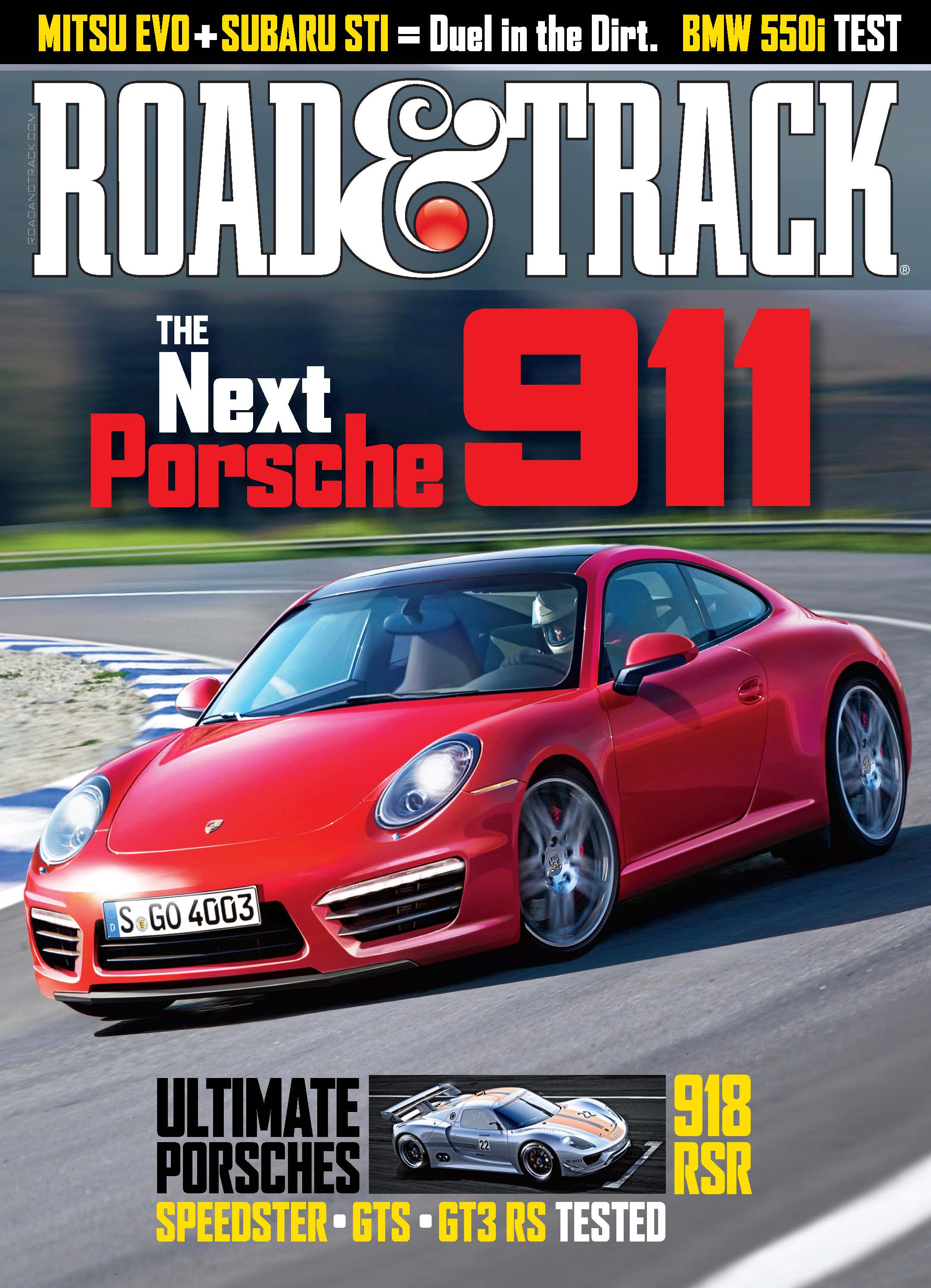
Cover during previous monthly era, from March 2011

Road & Track (often abbreviated R&T) was founded by two friends, Wilfred H. Brehaut, Jr. and Joseph S. Fennessy, in 1947, in Hempstead, New York. Published only six times from 1947 to 1949, it struggled in its early years. By 1952, regular contributor and editor John R. Bond and his wife Elaine had become the owners of the magazine, which then grew until its sale to CBS Publications in 1972.

The ampersand (&) in the title was introduced in 1955 by then Editor Terry Galanoy, who replaced the word "and" in the magazine's name because the words Road and Track were graphically too long for newsstand-effective recognition.

In 1988, Hachette Filipacchi Media took ownership of the magazine. In October 2008, Matt DeLorenzo became editor-in-chief, succeeding Thos L. Bryant, who had been in place for 20 years. Hearst Magazines purchased the magazine in 2011. In June 2012, Larry Webster assumed the role of editor-in-chief, and DeLorenzo became an adviser to the publication. Additionally, the magazine moved its operations from Newport Beach, California, to Ann Arbor, Michigan.

In February 2016, Webster resigned as editor-in-chief and Kim Wolfkill was announced as his replacement. In the March/April 2019 issue, Wolfkill announced that the editorial offices in Michigan were closing, and that publication was moving to New York, New York, at the Hearst Tower. His LinkedIn profile lists February 2019 as his final date at Road & Track. Travis Okulski, Road & Track's website director at the time, took on the editor-in-chief role from the May 2019 issue onwards.

Car and Driver and Road & Track are sister publications at Hearst and share the same advertising, sales, marketing, and circulation departments. However, their editorial operations are distinct and they have separate publishers. This arrangement exists since 1985, when CBS acquired Ziff Davis' consumer magazines and among them, Car and Driver.

In August 2020, the magazine transitioned to a large-format bi-monthly that emphasized elegant design and deeply-reported features. Incoming Editor-in-Chief Mike Guy, who had previously launched The Drive for Time Inc., hired Executive Editor Daniel Pund and Creative Director Nathan Schroeder, and together they refashioned Road & Track as the premium, 180-page enthusiast magazine on stands today. The Smoking Tire's Matt Farah and best-selling author A.J. Baime (Go Like Hell, The Accidental President) joined as Editors-at-Large.

In January 2024, former Executive Editor Dan Pund was confirmed as Road & Track's new Editor-in-Chief.

== Content ==
Road & Track focuses on new production cars, vintage cars, and race cars with drive reviews, road trips, and comparison tests. Former race car drivers have often contributed material, including Paul Frère, Sam Posey, and Formula One champion Phil Hill. Other notable contributors include McLaren F1 designer Gordon Murray, car executive Bob Lutz, Henry N. Manney III, Peter Egan, Jason Cammisa, and Matt Farah.

Like many auto magazines, Road & Track published an annual "car of the year" test, dubbed the Road & Track Performance Car of the Year. The test's most recent winner was the 2020 Hyundai Veloster N.

== Video games ==
Road & Track contributed to the 1992 video game, Grand Prix Unlimited, developed by Accolade for MS-DOS. The magazine also contributed to the 1994 video game, The Need for Speed, to help the designers match vehicle behavior and sounds to that of the real cars.

== See also ==
- Car and Driver
- Automobile
- Motor Trend
