= International Motor Press Association =

Automotive journalists trade association

- Formation: 1909
- Official language: English
- President: Fred Chieco, WABC-TV
- Key people: Bill Howard, 1st VP; Jim Henry, 2nd VP; Andrea Canabal, Secretary; Mike Geylin, Treasurer; Dave Kiley, President Emeritus
- Website: www.impa.org

The International Motor Press Association (IMPA), is the oldest trade association representing automotive journalists and public relations professionals in the United States. It was established in 1909.

== Activities ==
Monthly meetings

On the third Thursday of each month, members in New York City hold a luncheon meeting. The purpose of the meeting is twofold:

- Provide a place for member networking
- Provide speakers from the Automotive industry to discuss topics such as:
  - Automotive products
  - Current and future automotive technologies
  - Market conditions
  - Marketing trends
  - Motorsports

Annual test days

For two days each fall, IMPA members have the opportunity to test drive new and improved automobiles on an auto-test track and, as appropriate, off-road. A typical location for the test track is the Pocono Raceway in the Pocono Mountains at Long Pond, Pennsylvania. Concluding this event is the annual "Test Fest" dinner, providing banquet, socializing, and social networking.

Annual meeting and Ken W. Purdy Award

Prior to the opening of press days for the yearly New York International Auto Show, the IMPA hosts a breakfast meeting for its members at the Jacob K. Javits Convention Center in New York City. Here, a speaker from the leadership of the automotive industry provides insight into key issues in that industry. In addition, the association presents its annual Ken W. Purdy Award for excellence in automotive journalism.

== See also ==
- Alliance of Automobile Manufacturers
