= Freddie Spencer =

American motorcycle racer (born 1961)

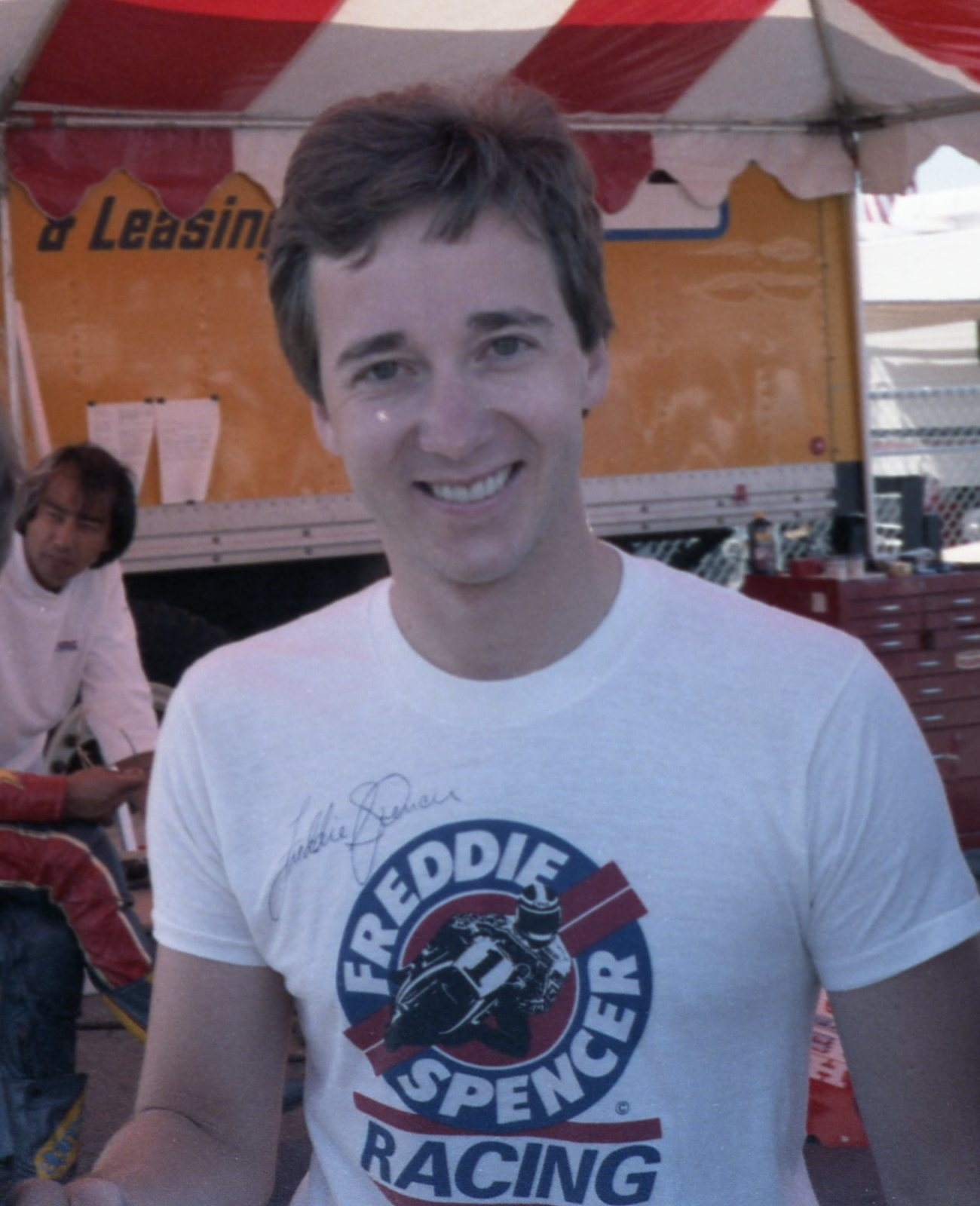
- Spencer at Laguna Seca Raceway in 1985
- Born: December 20, 1961 (age 64); Shreveport, Louisiana, U.S.
Motorcycle racing career statistics
Grand Prix motorcycle racing
Active years	1980–1987, 1989, 1993
First race	1980 500cc Belgian Grand Prix
Last race	1993 500cc Italian Grand Prix
First win	1982 500cc Belgian Grand Prix
Last win	1985 500cc Swedish Grand Prix
Team(s)	Honda, Yamaha
Championships	500cc – 1983, 1985; 250cc – 1985
Starts / Wins / Podiums / Poles / F. laps / Points; 72 / 27 / 39 / 33 / 24 / 610.5

Frederick Burdette Spencer (born December 20, 1961) is an American former professional motorcycle road racer. He competed in the FIM Grand Prix motorcycle racing world championships between 1980 and 1993, most prominently as a member of the Honda factory racing team where he was a three-time world champion. Nicknamed Fast Freddie, Spencer is regarded as one of the most accomplished motorcycle racers of the early 1980s.

== Motorcycle racing career ==
=== Early years ===
Spencer was born in Shreveport, Louisiana. He was a racing prodigy who began racing at the age of four, competing in dirt track events near his hometown of Shreveport. After winning the 1978 250cc U.S. National Novice Class Road Racing Championship for first year professionals, Spencer was contracted to ride for the American Honda racing team in the AMA Superbike Championship. He gave Honda their first-ever super bike victory when he won the Road America round of the 1980 AMA Superbike Championship.

Spencer gained international prominence at the 1980 U.S. versus Britain Transatlantic Trophy match races when he won two legs at Brands Hatch, defeating World Champions Kenny Roberts and Barry Sheene in the process. Spencer went on to finish third in the 1980 Superbike championships and second to Eddie Lawson in 1981. In 1981, he split his time between the AMA Superbike series, and the European Grand Prix circuit, helping Honda develop the exotic, oval-pistoned NR500 four-stroke Grand Prix bike.

=== Grand Prix world championships ===
By 1982, Spencer had been promoted full-time to Honda's Grand Prix team, who by then had given up on the NR500 and developed the NS500 three cylinder, two-stroke. In 1983, Spencer won his first 500cc World Championship at the age of 21, becoming the youngest person to win the title, a distinction previously held by Mike Hailwood. His record has since been surpassed by Marc Márquez in 2013.

The 1983 season would be remembered as one of the most dramatic title chases in the history of Grand Prix racing; Honda's Spencer and Yamaha's Kenny Roberts fought back and forth for the points lead with each of them earning six victories. The season culminated at the penultimate round in Sweden when the two riders collided on the last lap. Roberts ran off the track leaving Spencer to sprint to the finish line and victory. Roberts won the last race but Spencer finished second, securing his first world title by two points.

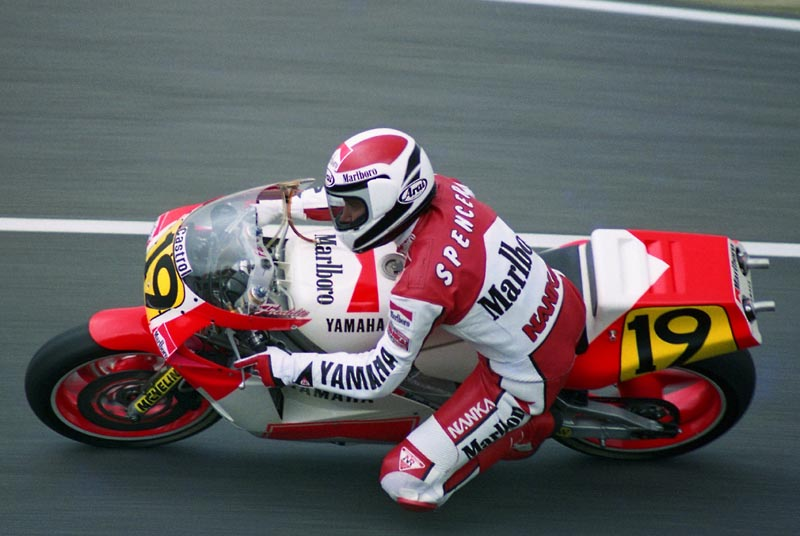
Spencer on Yamaha YZR500 at the 1989 Japanese Grand Prix

In 1984, Honda developed a radically new V4 NSR500 that featured the fuel tank under the engine and the expansion chambers under a false tank above the engine. Teething problems and injuries from crashes hindered Spencer's defense of his crown and he was relegated to fourth place in the championship. In spite of this, he still managed to win three times with the NSR500, and twice more on the NS500 three cylinder machine.

1985 proved to be a historic year for Spencer. He began the season by winning the prestigious season opening Daytona 200. Spencer also won the Formula 1 and 250cc classes, making him the only rider to win all three divisions in a single year. Spencer also competed in both the 250cc and 500cc Grand Prix World Championships, winning both titles in the same year. That made him the fifth (and last) rider ever to win in the 500cc and the next class down and, due to class changes, the only rider to win in both 500cc and 250cc in one year. His career was cut short by wrist injuries that some believe were caused by the physical strain of competing in two championships during a single season.

After his historic 1985 season, Spencer never won another Grand Prix race. He retired from Grand Prix racing at the beginning of 1988, although there were a couple of GP comeback attempts, in 1989 and 1993.

=== Later career ===
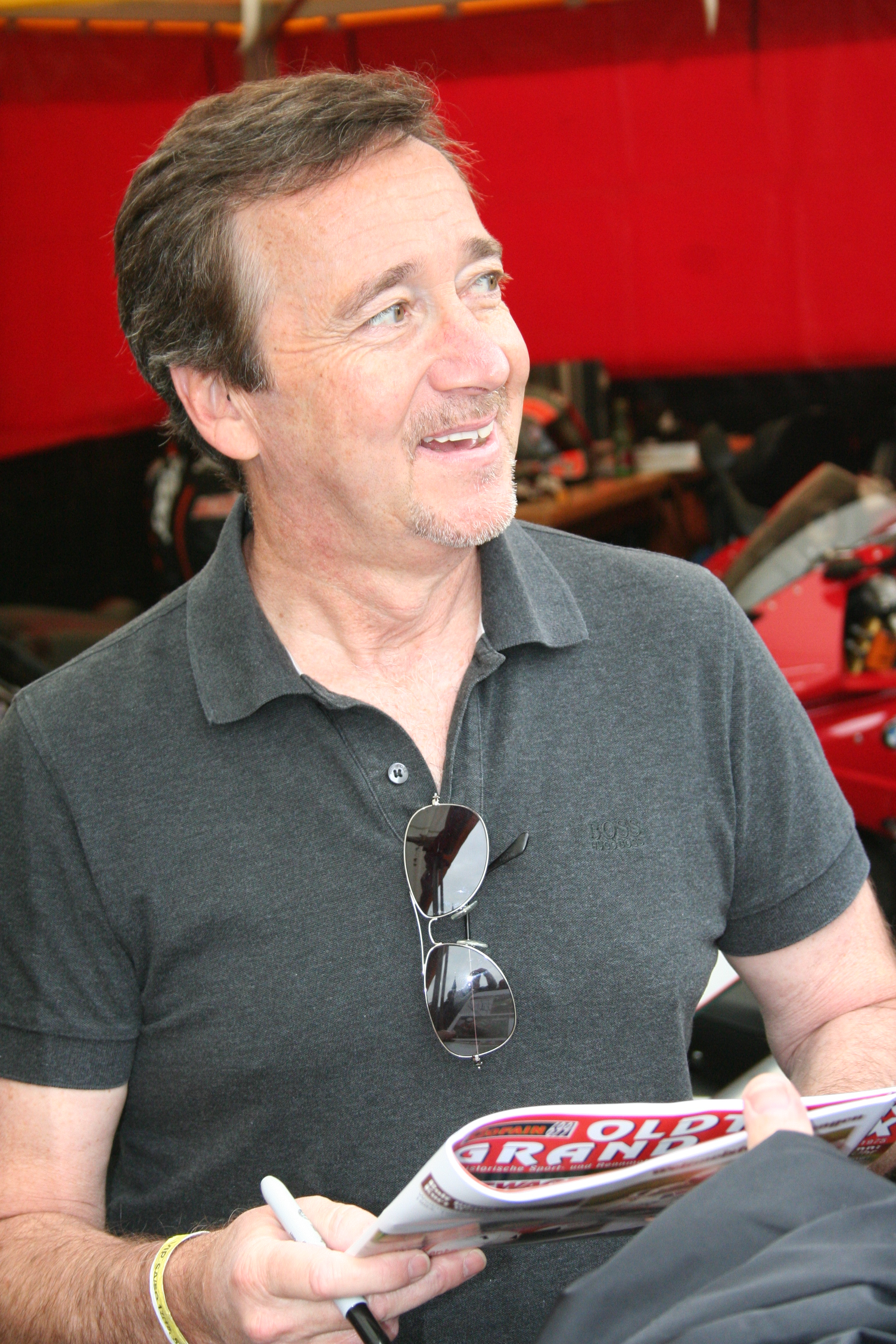
Spencer in 2016

Spencer returned to race in the AMA Superbike Championship in the 1990s, winning three races. He was eighth in 1991, riding a Honda for Two Brothers Racing, and went one better in 1992. In 1995, he raced a Fast By Ferracci Ducati to ninth, and at the end of the year took over the works Ducati from Mauro Lucchiari in Superbike World Championship.

Spencer raced under several different marques during his career, winning his first Superbike National Championship race aboard a Kawasaki, but he is most closely associated with Honda and his partnership with Grand Prix tuner, Erv Kanemoto. He won all three of his world titles on Hondas with Kanemoto as head mechanic. Spencer had a short stint with the Agostini Yamaha team and ended his career on a Ducati in the US National Championship.

For many years, Spencer operated a motorcycle riding school, Freddie Spencer's High Performance Riding School, until October 2008. Primarily based in Las Vegas, Nevada, the school counted Nick Ienatsch and Ken Hill as chief instructor and lead instructor, respectively. After it closed, Ienatsch founded a successor-program, the Yamaha Champions Riding School.

Spencer now lives in London, England and comments on television for various racing series. In 2019, Spencer was appointed the chairman of the FIM MotoGP Stewards Panel.

== Honors ==
- "Freddie Spencer Day", declared in 1984 by Mayor John Brennan Hussey in Shreveport after Spencer won the 500cc World Championship the previous year. Sheriff of Caddo Parish, Don Hathaway made Spencer an "honorary deputy" for the occasion.
- Inducted into the AMA Motorcycle Hall of Fame in 1999.
- Inducted into the Motorsports Hall of Fame of America in 2001.
- The FIM named him a Grand Prix "Legend" in 2001.
- Inducted Into the Louisiana Sports Hall of Fame in 2009.

== Grand Prix career statistics ==
The following is a list of results achieved by Spencer.

Points system from 1968 to 1987.

**Position**	1	2	3	4	5	6	7	8	9	10
**Points**	15	12	10	8	6	5	4	3	2	1

Points system from 1988 to 1992.

**Position**	1	2	3	4	5	6	7	8	9	10	11	12	13	14	15
**Points**	20	17	15	13	11	10	9	8	7	6	5	4	3	2	1

(key) (Races in bold indicate pole position; races in italics indicate fastest lap)

Year	Class	Team	Machine	1	2	3	4	5	6	7	8	9	10	11	12	13	14	15	Points	Rank	Wins
1980	500cc	Spencer Yamaha	TZ500	NAT -	ESP -	FRA -	NED -	BEL; NC	FIN -	GBR -	GER -								0	-	0
1981	500cc	Honda-HRC	NR500	AUT -	GER -	NAT -	FRA -	YUG -	NED -	BEL -	RSM -	GBR; DNF	FIN -	SWE -					0	-	0
1982	500cc	Honda-HRC	NS500	ARG; 3	AUT; NC	FRA -	**ESP**; NC	NAT; 2	NED; DNF	BEL; 1	YUG; 4	GBR; 2	**SWE**; NC	**RSM**; 1	**GER**; DNF				73	**3rd**	2
1983	500cc	Honda-HRC	NS500	**RSA**; 1	FRA; 1	NAT; 1	**GER**; 4	**ESP**; 1	AUT; NC	**YUG**; 1	NED; 3	**BEL**; 2	GBR; 2	**SWE**; 1	RSM; 2				144	**1st**	6
1984	500cc	Honda-HRC	NSR500	**RSA**; DNS	**NAT**; 1	ESP -	AUT; 2		**FRA**; 1	**YUG**; 1	NED; NC								87	4th	5
1984	500cc	Honda-HRC	NS500					**GER**; 1				**BEL**; 1	GBR -	SWE -	RSM -				87	4th	5
1985	250cc	Rothmans Honda-HRC	NSR250	RSA; 1	**ESP**; 9	**GER**; 2	NAT; 1	**AUT**; 1	**YUG**; 1	NED; 1	**BEL**; 1	**FRA**; 1	GBR; 4	SWE -	RSM -				127	**1st**	7
1985	500cc	Rothmans Honda-HRC	NSR500	**RSA**; 2	ESP; 1	**GER**; 2	**NAT**; 1	**AUT**; 1	**YUG**; 2	**NED**; NC	**BEL**; 1	**FRA**; 1	**GBR**; 1	**SWE**; 1	RSM -				141	**1st**	7
1986	500cc	Rothmans Honda-HRC	NSR500	**ESP**; NC	NAT -	GER -	AUT; NC	YUG -	NED -	BEL -	FRA -	GBR -	SWE -	RSM -					0	-	0
1987	500cc	Honda-HRC	NSR500	JPN -	ESP -	GER -	NAT -	AUT -	YUG -	NED -	FRA -	GBR; NC	SWE; 7	CZE; 11	RSM; NC	POR -	BRA -	ARG -	4	20th	0
1989	500cc	Marlboro Agostini Yamaha	YZR500	JPN; 14	AUS; NC	USA; DNF	ESP; 5	NAT; DNS	GER; 9	AUT; 9	YUG; 27	NED; 13	BEL; 9	FRA; DNF	GBR -	SWE -	CZE -	BRA -	33.5	16th	0
1993	500cc	Yamaha of France	YZR500	AUS; DNF	MAL -	JPN -	ESP -	AUT -	GER -	NED -	EUR -	RSM -	GBR -	CZE; DNF	ITA; 14	USA -	FIM -		2	37th	0

== Books ==
- Harris, Nick; Clifford, Peter (1986). Fast Freddie: Double World Champion Freddie Spencer, The Man and his Machines. UK: Motor Racing Publications Ltd. p. 143. ISBN 0-947981-08-X.
- Scott, Michael (1987). The Champions: Freddie Spencer. UK: William Kimberley Limited. p. 64. ISBN 0-946132-31-3.

== Bibliography ==
- Spencer, Freddie (20 April 2017). Feel: My Story. Virgin Books. ISBN 978-0753545614.
