= Nick Ienatsch =

American motorcycle racer (born 1961/62)

- Born: 1961 or 1962 (age 63–64); Eau Claire, Wisconsin, U.S.
- Occupations: Motorcycle racer, writer, riding instructor
- Spouse: Judy Ienatsch (née Perez) (m. 1997)

Nick Ienatsch (/ˈaɪnɑːtʃ/ EYE-nahch, born 1961 in Eau Claire, Wisconsin) is an American motorcycle racer, writer, and motorcycle riding instructor.

== Racing ==
ARRA #1 plate at Willow Springs Raceway 1989, 1990

WERA Grand National Finals champion in three classes: 1989

AMA 250GP #2 and #3 plate holder: 1991, 1993, 1994, 1995

AMA Superteams #1 plate with Two Brothers Racing, 1993, Erion Racing 1994; #2 plate with Dutchman Racing 1995

AMA 600 Supersport podium finisher, Sears Point; Daytona

AHRMA winner on TZ750, NSR250, GPz550, KZ1000 currently

AMA/Dragbike ProStreet World Finals winner at Valdosta, GA 2008

FIM-certified runs over 200 mph during magazine testing with a best of 234

== Motorcycle schools ==
Ienatsch was the lead instructor for 12 years at Freddie Spencer Riding School. He later created and is lead instructor at Yamaha Champions Riding School.

== Writing ==
Ienatsch has written for Motorcyclist (1984–??) Sport Rider where he was founding editor (ca. 1985–1996) and Cycle World (1997–2012).

Ienatsch is also author of the 2003 book Sport Riding Techniques and the 2017 novel The Hill Ranch Racers.

In 1999, Ienatsch was the founding editor of MotoGP.com, through 2001.

Ienatsch wrote The Pace, The Pace 2.0, and The Brake Light Initiative

Ienatsch writes for CycleWorld.com on a weekly basis.

== Bibliography ==
- Nick Ienatsch (2003). Sport Riding Techniques: How To Develop Real World Skills for Speed, Safety, and Confidence on the Street and Track. David Bull Publishing. ISBN 1893618072.
- Nick Ienatsch (2016). The Hill Ranch Racers novel. Outskirts Press. ISBN 978-1-4787-6415-1
