= Quicksilver =

Quicksilver may refer to:

- Quicksilver (metal), the chemical element mercury

== Arts and entertainment ==
=== Fictional entities ===
- Quicksilver (Marvel Comics), a superhero in the Marvel Comics universe
- Quicksilver (DC Comics), or Max Mercury, a superhero in the DC Comics universe
- Quicksilver, leader of the SilverHawks on the 1986 animated television series SilverHawks
- Quicksilver, a fictional synthetic hormone in The Invisible Man
- Quicksilver, a dragon in The World of Ice & Fire and Fire & Blood

=== Literature ===
- Quicksilver (Stephenson novel), first volume of The Baroque Cycle by Neal Stephenson
- Quicksilver (Hart novel), romance novel by Callie Hart

=== Music ===
==== Music groups ====
- Quicksilver, a bluegrass band fronted by Doyle Lawson
- Shortened name form of Quicksilver Messenger Service, used by the band on their later record covers
- Quicksilver, a classical music ensemble directed by Robert Mealy & Julie Andrijeski

==== Music albums ====
- Quicksilver (soundtrack), from the 1986 film
- Quicksilver (album), 1971, by Quicksilver Messenger Service
- Quicksilver (EP), 2009, by The Crüxshadows

==== Songs ====
- "Quicksilver" (Bing Crosby song), 1950 hit (recorded 1949)
- "Quicksilver" (Horace Silver composition), 1952
- "Quicksilver" (Pink Floyd instrumental), from 1969 album Soundtrack from the Film More

=== Film and television ===
- Quicksilver (Irish game show), an Irish quiz show
- Quicksilver (film), a 1986 film

== Transportation ==
- USS Quicksilver, a US Navy patrol vessel
- Zimmer Quicksilver, a personal luxury car

== Computing ==
- QuickSilver (project), a software research project at Cornell University
- Quicksilver (software), an open source application launcher for Mac OS X
- QuickSilver, Broadvision desktop publishing software, formerly by Interleaf

== Organizations ==
- Quicksilver Aircraft, an American manufacturer of ultralight and light aircraft
- Quicksilver (ISP), a New Zealand internet service provider

=== Entertainment ===
- Quicksilver (company), UK's largest amusement arcade company
- Quiksilver, a surf and sports related apparel brand
- Quicksilver Software, a computer-games company
- Las Vegas Quicksilvers, a former soccer team

== People ==
- DJ Quicksilver (born 1964), electronic musician
- Quicksilver (wrestler), born Richard Clements, American professional wrestler

== Other uses ==
- Quicksilver, a locomotive of Great Western Railway 3031 Class
- Quixilver, either of two robotics teams at Leland High School (San Jose, California)

== See also ==
- Doyle Lawson & Quicksilver, a band
- Operation Quicksilver (disambiguation)
- Quicksilva, a video game publisher
- "Quicksilver Lightning", a 1968 single by Roger Daltrey
- "Quicksilver Girl", on Sailor (Steve Miller Band album), 1968
