= Phillips Berlina =

American car (1980–1983)

Phillips Berlina Coupé
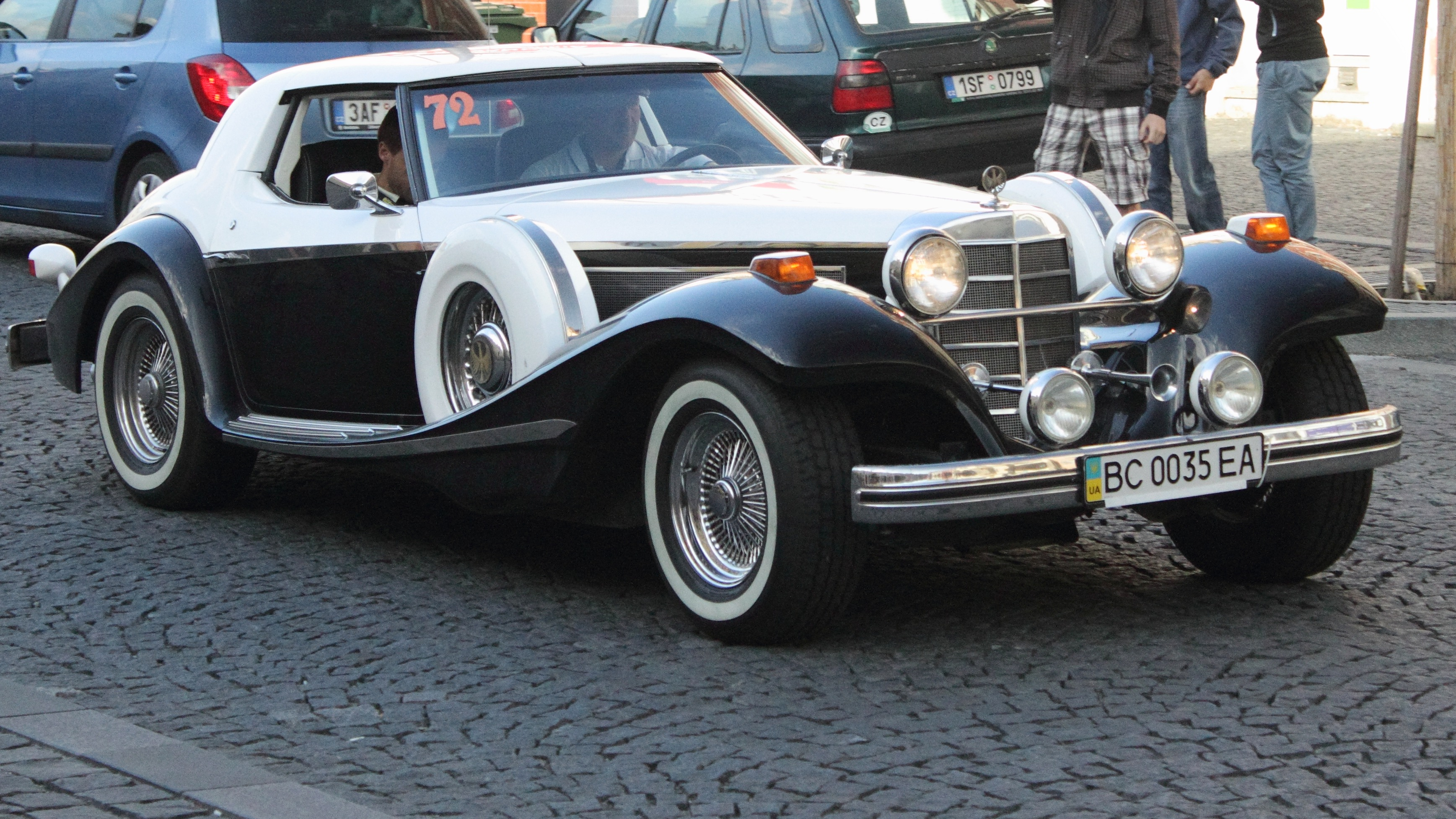

Overview
- Production: 1980–1983
- Assembly: Pompano Beach, Florida, United States
- Designer: Charles W. Phillips

Powertrain
- Engine: 5.7 L 350 small-block V8

Dimensions
- Length: 185 in (4,699 mm)

The Phillips Berlina is an American neoclassic car built in Pompano Beach, Florida.

== Background ==
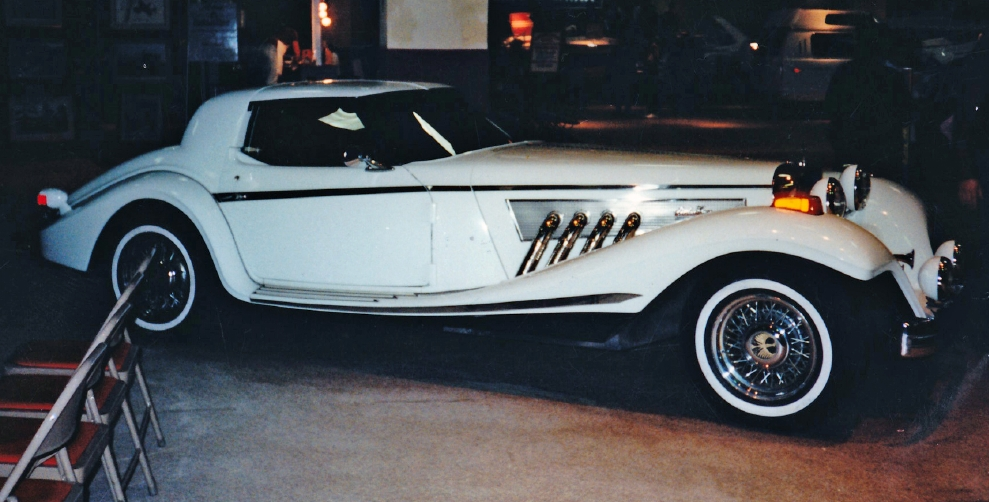
Phillips Berlina in Palm Beach, Florida in 1982

Debuting in 1980, it was designed by Charles W. Phillips in the style of the 1936 Mercedes-Benz 540K Special Roadster.

== Specifications ==
It used stretched C3 Chevrolet Corvette underpinnings, coupled to fibreglass bodywork. As for the Corvette, power steering and brakes, powered tinted windows, and tilt steering were fitted. The fuel-injected 5.7-litre V8 engine in the 1982 Berlinas offers 200 hp (149 kW) at 4,200 rpm, for a top speed of around 180 km/h (110 mph). The earlier carburetted version (L81) had 190 hp on tap. By 1982, a special "Coupé SE" version was also available.

== See also ==
- Excalibur
- Clénet
- Zimmer
- Stutz Blackhawk
