= Quicksilver (Bing Crosby song) =

Quicksilver is a song, which became a hit for Bing Crosby in 1950. It was written by Eddie Pola, George Wyle and Irving Taylor.

"Quicksilver" was recorded by Bing Crosby and the Andrews Sisters with Vic Schoen and his orchestra on November 25, 1949 and it became a top 10 hit in February 1950. In late February 1950 it was cited by Billboard as the fifth most popular record on jukeboxes. It peaked in mid March at Number 8 in the singles charts. By the end of April it was still in the charts at Number 30. It was the best selling single in Australia for the year of 1950.

Another version of this song was recorded by Doris Day & Her Country Cousins in 1949 and this also reached the USA charts with a peak position of No. 20.

A version by Elton Britt and Rosalie Allen reached #3 on the US charts for country music in 1950, and was included on Country USA (Time-Life Music).

== See also ==
- Quicksilver (Horace Silver composition), another 1950s jazz song by the same title
  - For more musical works by this name, see Quicksilver (disambiguation) § Music
