= Excalibur (automobile) =

Automobile from Milwaukee, Wisconsin

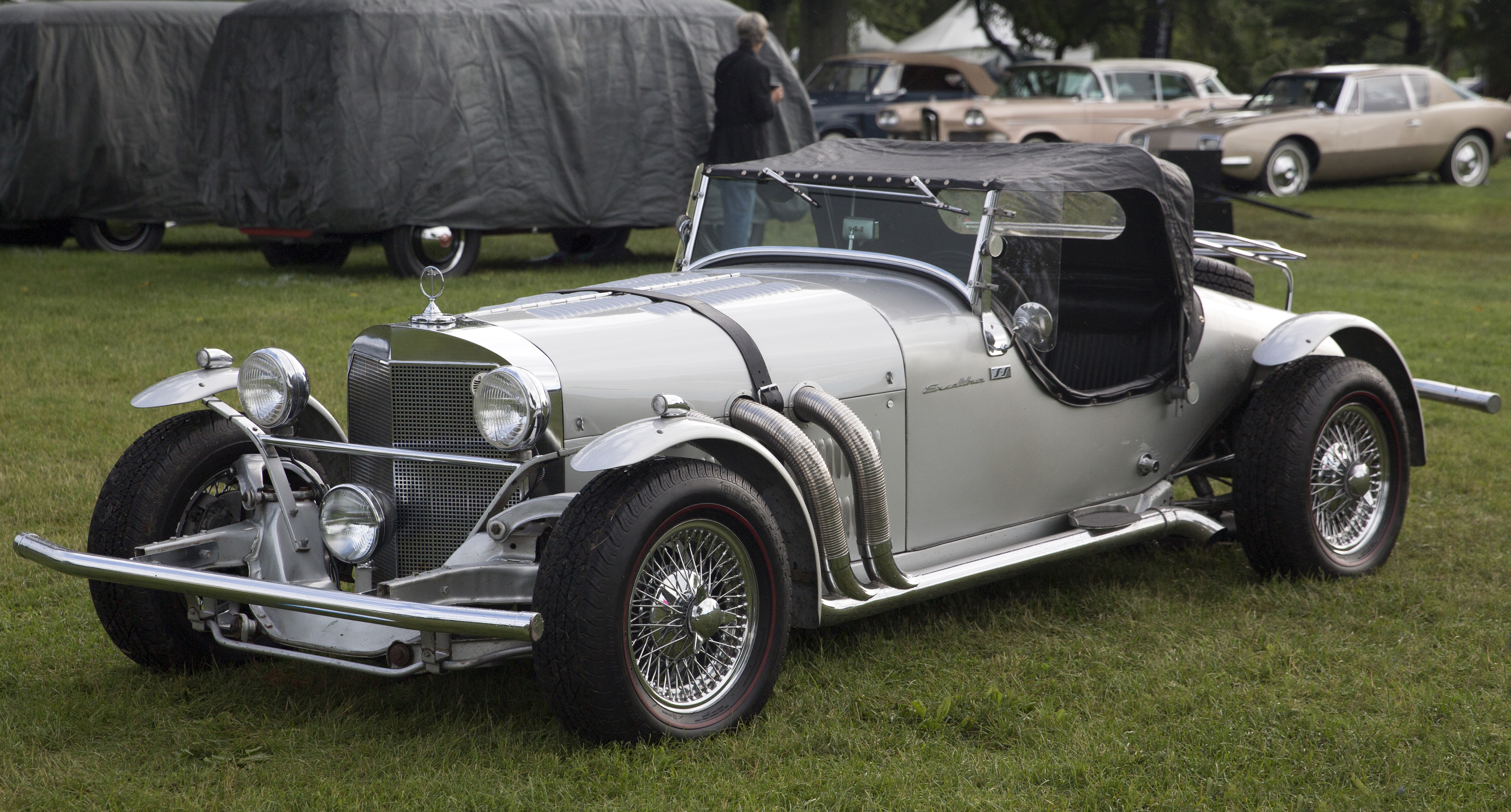
1965 Excalibur SSK (Series I); the second chassis built

The Excalibur automobile is a car styled after the 1928 Mercedes-Benz SSK by Brooks Stevens for Studebaker. Stevens subsequently formed a company to manufacture and market the cars, which were a standard Studebaker chassis with special bodywork (and soon got an upgraded engine as well). The Excalibur has a Neoclassic design, a term used to designate automobiles produced in the 1960s–1990s in the style of cars of the 1920s and 1930s. Zimmer and Tiffany are two additional examples of Neoclassic design.

== History ==
A prototype premiered at car shows in 1963, fitted on a Studebaker Lark Convertible chassis and using a 290 hp (294 PS; 216 kW) Studebaker 289 V-8. Studebaker ceased engine production in December 1963 and consolidating all manufacturing to its Hamilton, Ontario, plant, ending the availability of that engine.

Stevens subsequently obtained engines from General Motors through his friends GM executives Ed Cole and Semon "Bunkie" Knudsen. Over 3,500 Excalibur cars were built, all in Milwaukee, Wisconsin. The American comedian Phyllis Diller was a notable proponent of the Excalibur automobile, and owned four of them.

The company failed in 1986 but was revived several times. Series production of the Excalibur continued until 1990, with a few false starts taking place under new owners afterwards. The final Excalibur was built in 1997.

== Series I ==
Built between 1965 and 1969 (and sold into 1970 from existing stock), the Series I was available as the Excalibur SS or the supercharged SSK. These used Chevrolet 327 V8s in 300 hp (304 PS; 224 kW) Corvette tune. With a weight of 2,100 lb (953 kg) and the standard 3.31:1 rear axle, acceleration from 0–60 mph (0–97 km/h) took less than six seconds. Projected top speed was 134 mph (216 km/h). The Series I car used a batch of 400 unusable Studebaker Lark chassis bought from the failing manufacturer.

The initial, "Step-Over" design had no doors and used cycle fenders. For 1966, a roadster with proper mudguards and running boards was introduced, as well as the four-seater Phaeton model.

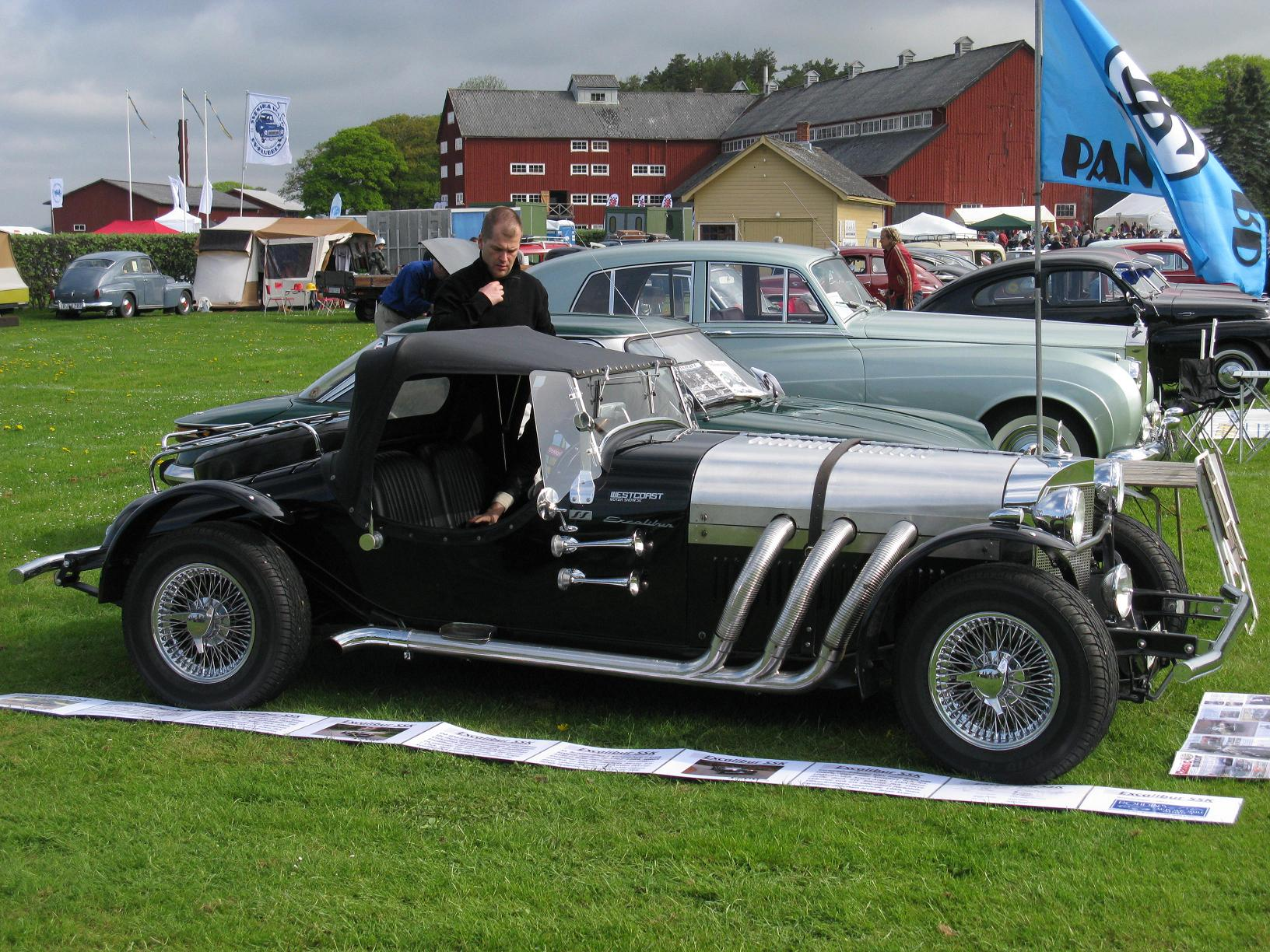
Excalibur SS (Series I)

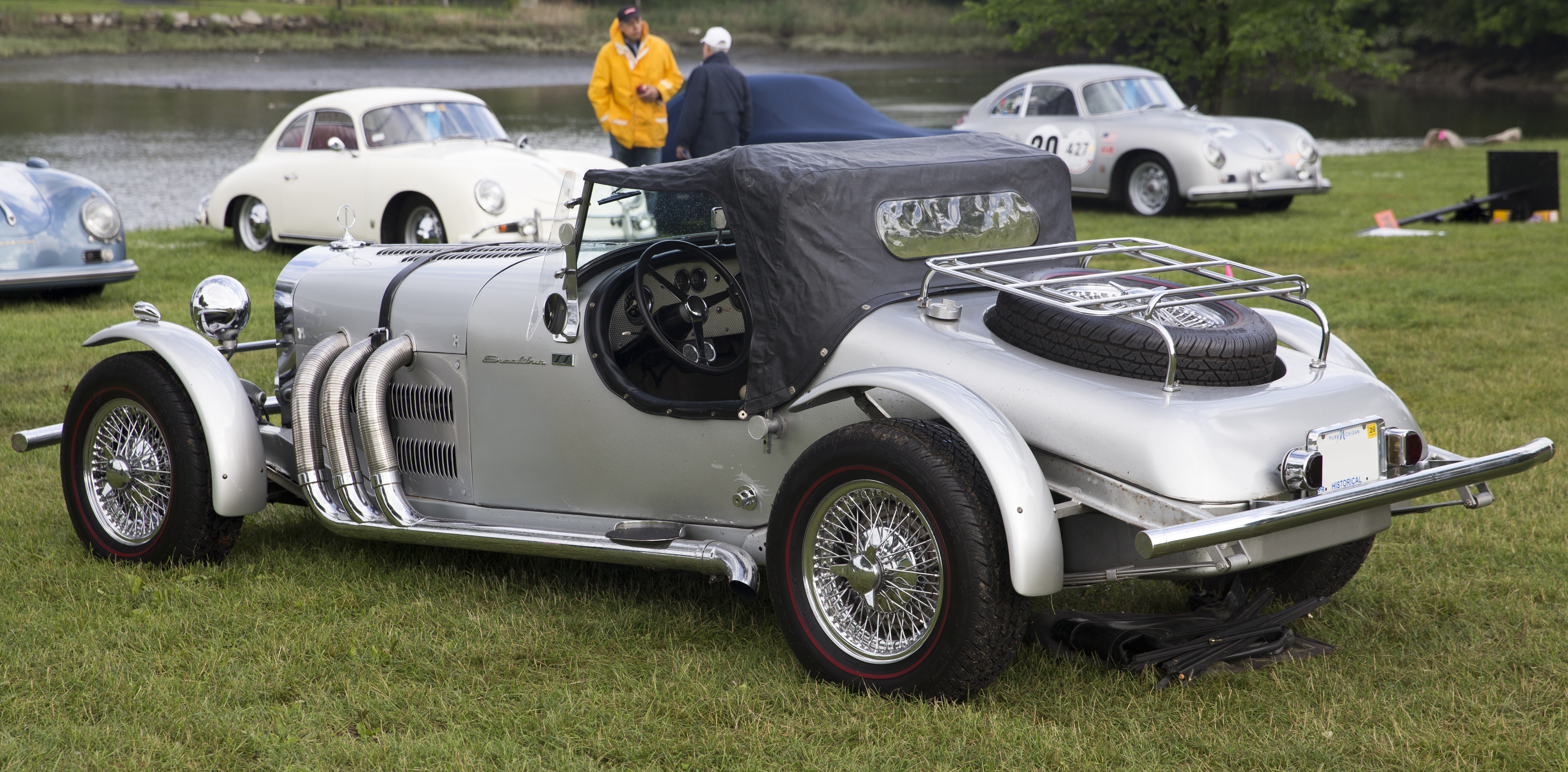
Rear view of a 1965 SSK (supercharged; the second chassis)

== Series II ==
The Series II was about 2 inches (5 cm) longer than the Series I, initially sitting on a wheelbase of 111 inches (2,819 mm). The cars were now built on an assembly line, with proper contracts from parts and assembly suppliers. The chassis was no longer from Studebaker; instead Excalibur developed their own ladder frame chassis with suspension parts and the four-wheel disc brakes from the Corvette. The engine was Chevrolet's 350 V8, still producing 300 hp (224 kW). The molds for the bodyworks were refined and equipment levels considerably increased, which justified a price which was nearly double that of the initial model. Bodystyles included the SS Roadster, SSK Roadster, and SS Phaeton. The SSK, a sportier model with cycle fenders and no running boards, was only available in 1970. Sales however, dropped precipitously: only 37 examples were built in 1970, and none in 1971.

Excalibur changed the design thoroughly for 1972, and sales rebounded in 1972, with 122 cars built that year. The chassis was now a ladder-frame rear with central X-frame cross bracing, matched to the front end from a Camaro; the wheelbase went up to 112 inches (2,845 mm). The new chassis allowed Excalibur to fit Chevrolet's 454 cu in (7,439 cc; 7.4 L) Big Block V8. Originally with 330 hp SAE Gross (246 kW), claimed power dropped as outputs changed to net rather than gross: the 1974 Excalibur claimed 270 hp SAE Net (201 kW). The first model years have a windshield which could be folded forward; this was changed for a fixed unit for 1973 to meet new safety standards.

The Series II was the first Excalibur to use the front, fender-mounted turn signals from the Volkswagen Beetle - initially the 1968 design was used, but later the larger units introduced by Volkswagen for 1970, a design Excalibur kept using until the end of production in the 1990s. Unlike later Excaliburs, the Series II also used the 1968 Beetle's taillights, updating to the Super Beetle's "Elephant Foot" taillights in circa 1973.

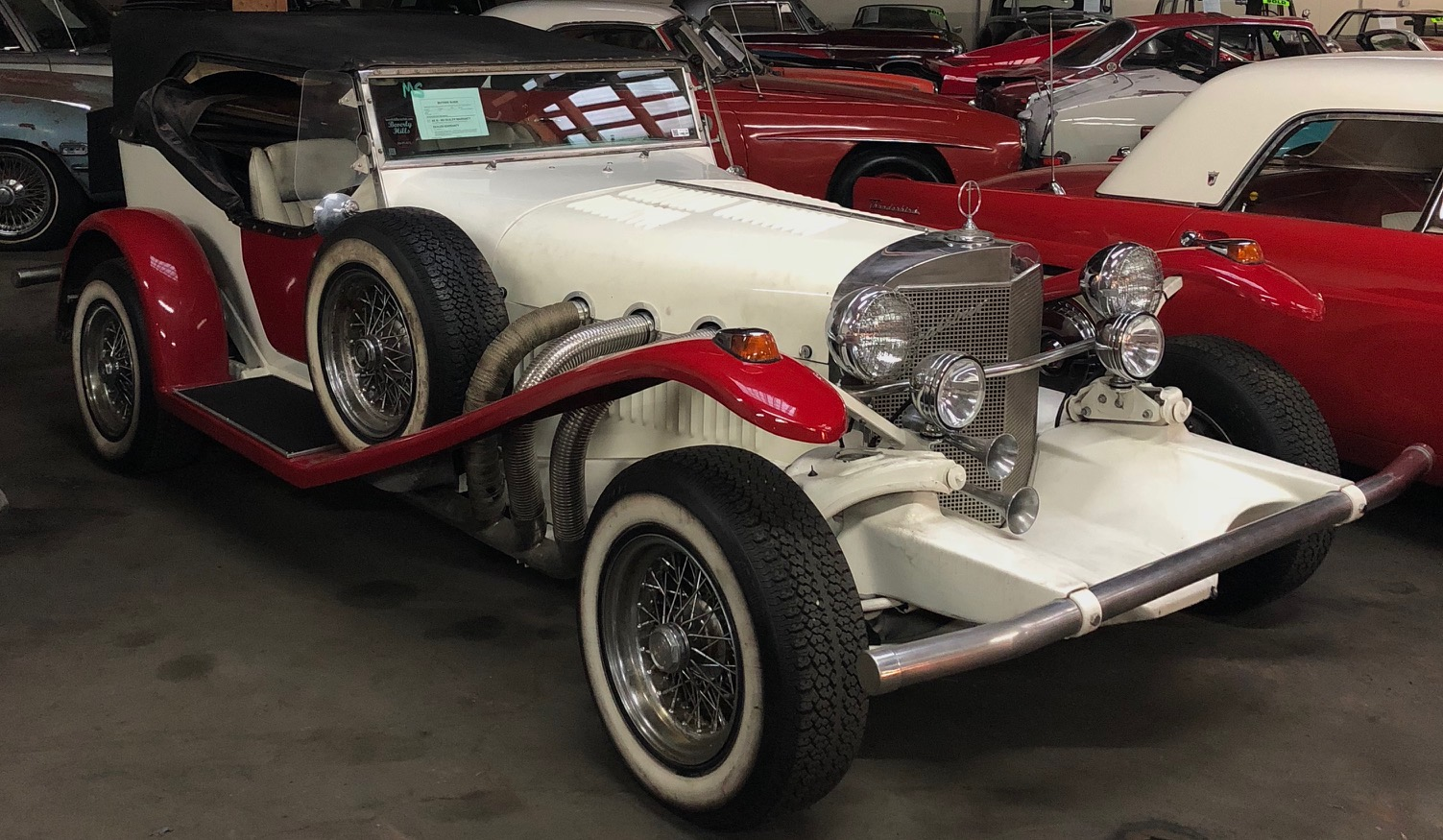
Series II Phaeton (1972) - the front was redesigned to meet new, Federal safety standards

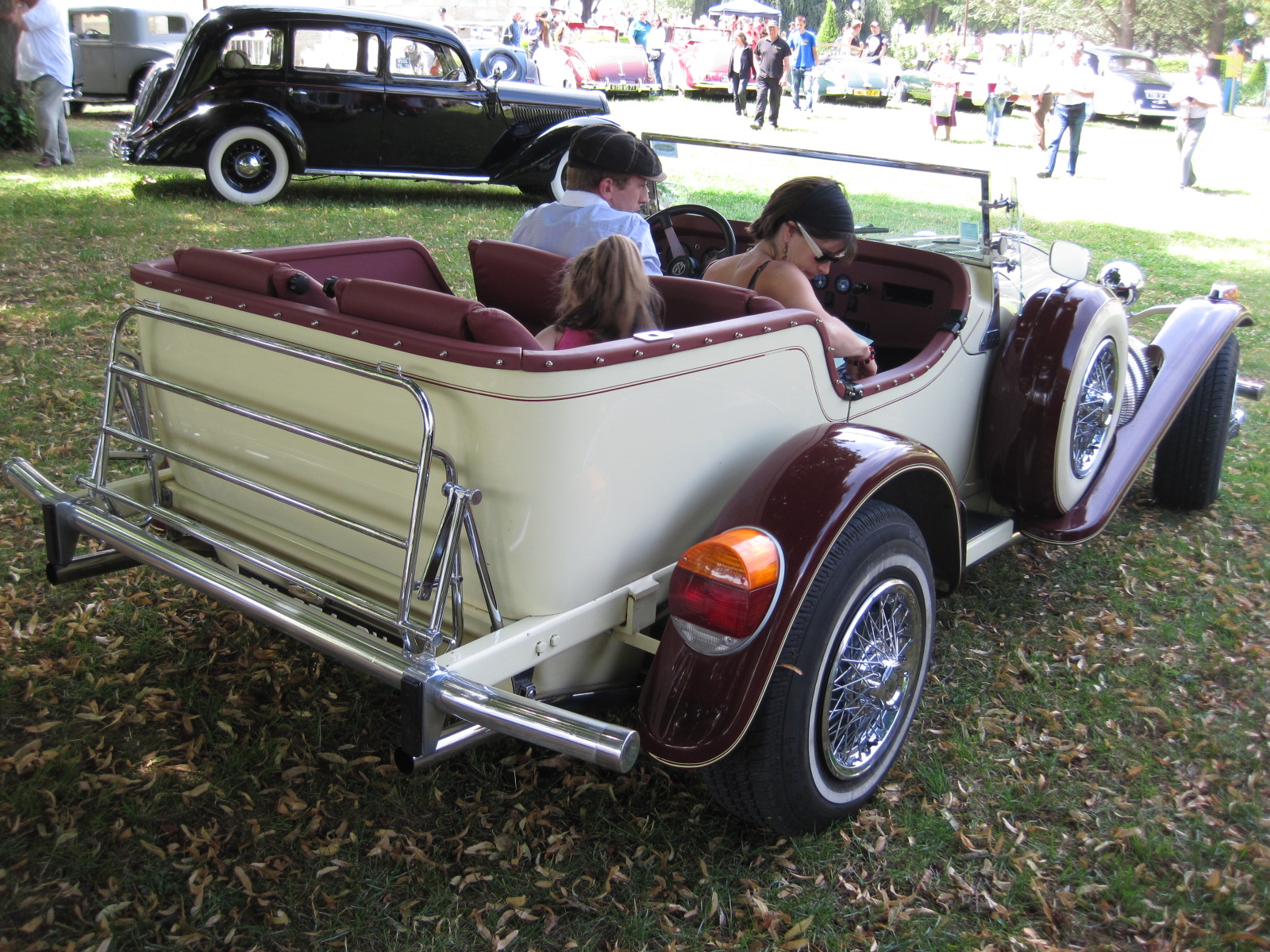
Rear view of a Series II Phaeton; note the Volkswagen Super Beetle's taillights

== Series III ==
With the Series III, which appeared for the 1975 model year, sales took off, reaching 367 examples by 1979 - although the higher production rate lowered the quality of the cars. Total production was 1,141 cars (some sources state 1,185), of which only 76 were Roadsters. The Series III kept a modified version of the Series II's ladder frame chassis. As Detroit's engines and outputs shrunk after the fuel crisis Excalibur had to switch to the truck version of the 454, producing 215 hp SAE (160 kW). The Series III kept using the Super Beetle's taillights, but the fenders were no more enveloping, eschewing the open sides of the Series I and II cars. The car also received new bumpers and various other revisions to remain compliant with safety legislation.

=== Limited Edition 100 ===
German investors Udo Geitlinger and Michael Timmer took over the company in 1991, after the 1990 bankruptcy. They had planned to simply restart production, but soon found out that the plant was missing many tools and construction plans, while the parts stock was nearly depleted. Timmer left the picture, being replaced by the Udo's son Jens, and the company was reformed as the Excalibur Automobile Corporation. After having hired a handful of earlier Excalibur employees, the Geitlingers instead chose to revive the Series III in modernized form. The new manufacturing facilities were established in West Allis, just outside Milwaukee where the original company had been headquartered. The Geitlingers also started building an AC Cobra replica called the Excalibur JAC Cobra alongside what was now called the Excalibur Limited Edition 100. As implied by the name, they planned to build 100 examples, but in the end only 23 (or possibly 27) were built in the early nineties.

The design has en enclosed rear end, with fenders more enveloping than on the original Series III, and small rectangular taillights rather than the earlier Super Beetle units. The engine was upgraded to Chevrolet's small-block 350, initially with 250 hp (186 kW; 253 PS) but this was later changed to the Corvette's LT1 engine with 300 hp (224 kW; 304 PS) instead. With a four-speed 700R4 automatic transmission, a 0–60 mph (97 km/h) time of 4.7 seconds was claimed, along with a top speed of 145 mph (233 km/h). Inside, a driver's side airbag was offered, as well as anti-lock brakes.

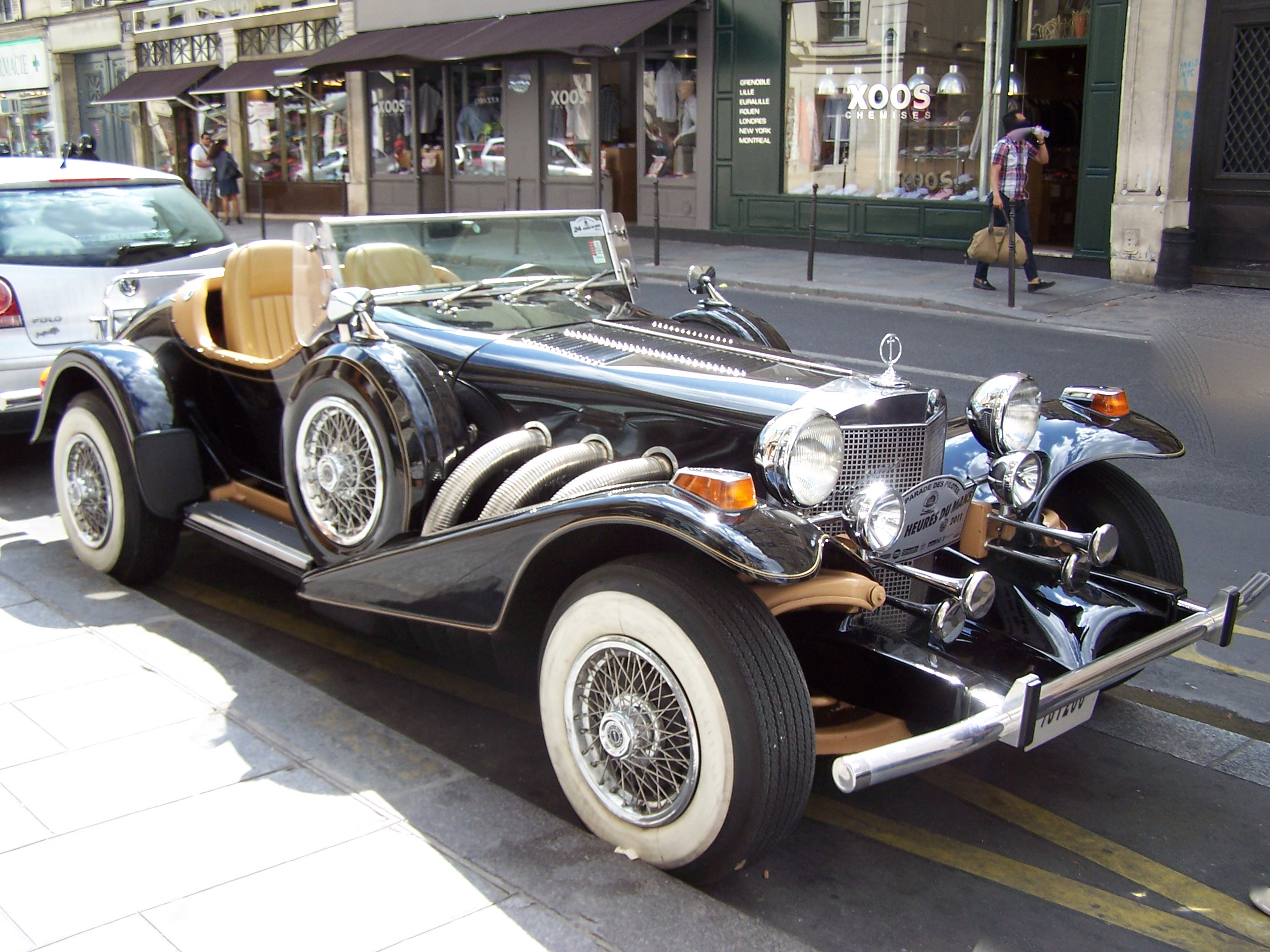
Series III Roadster SS - the front was redesigned to meet new, Federal safety standards

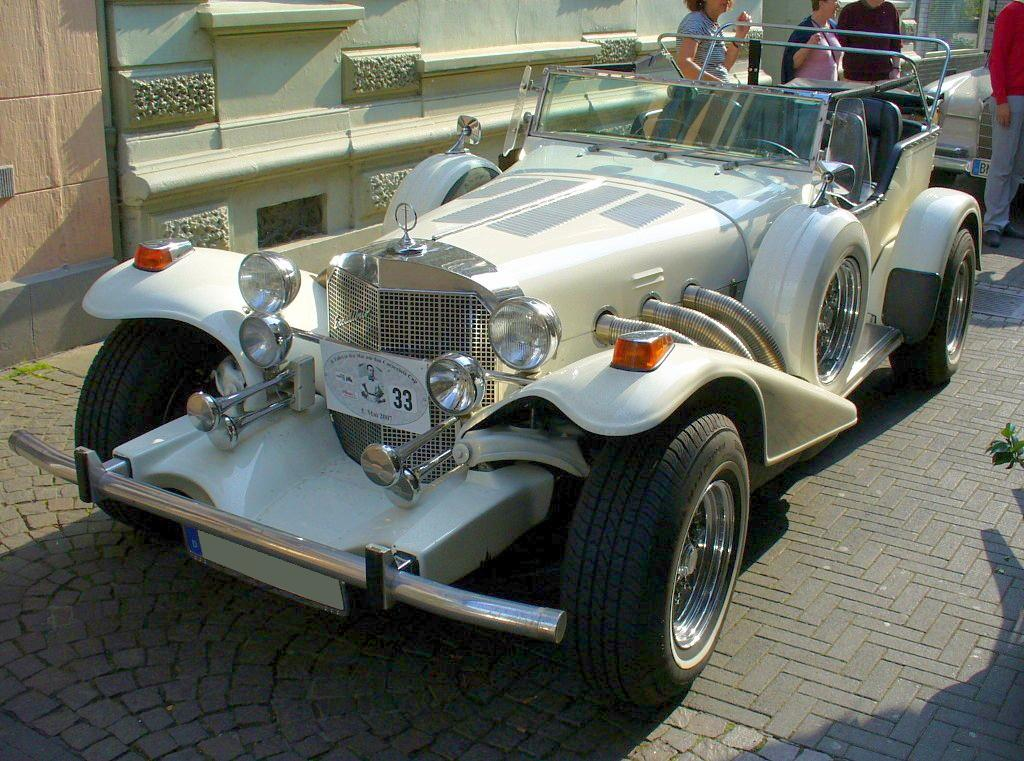
Series III Phaeton

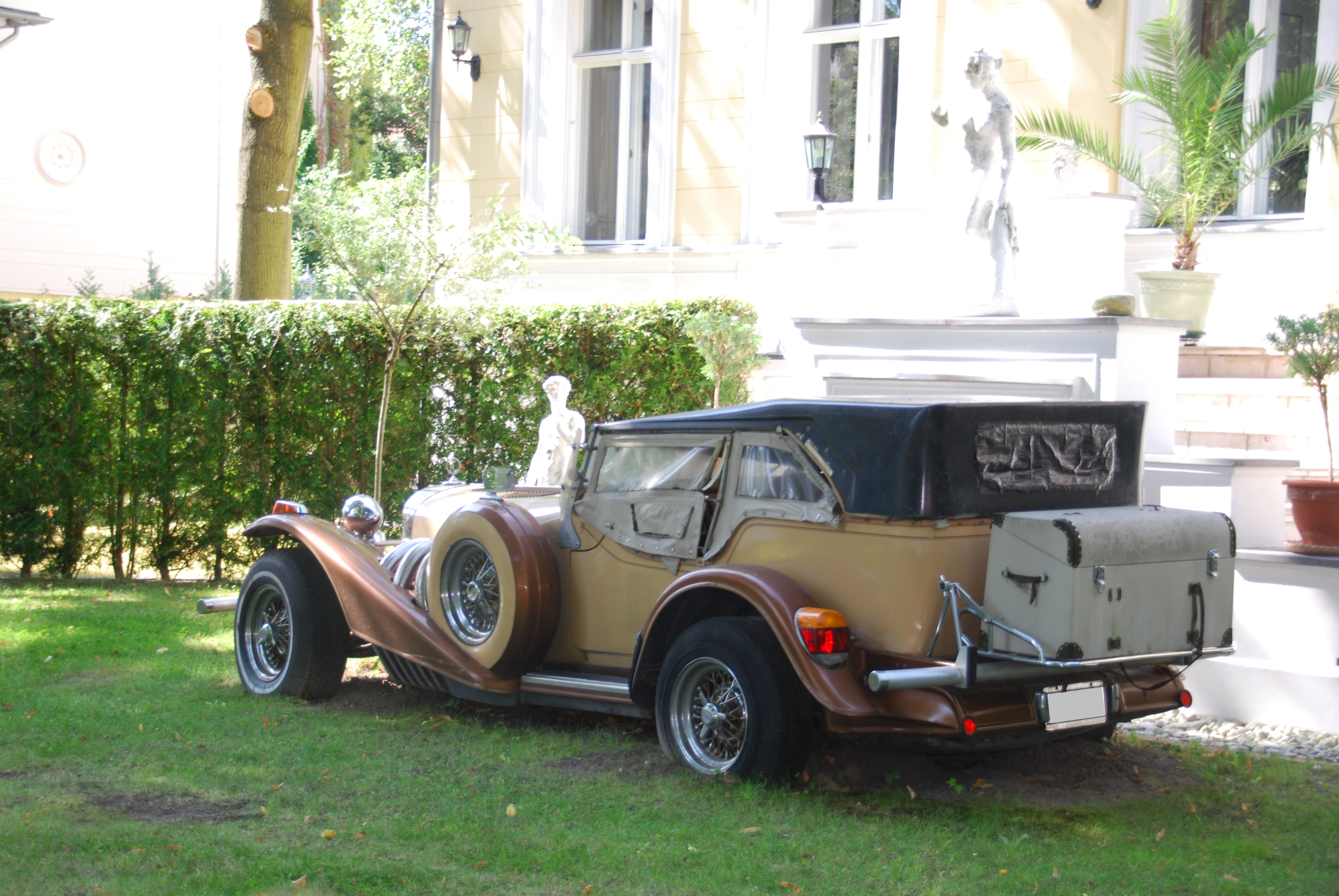
Rear view of a Series III Phaeton; note the Volkswagen Super Beetle's taillights

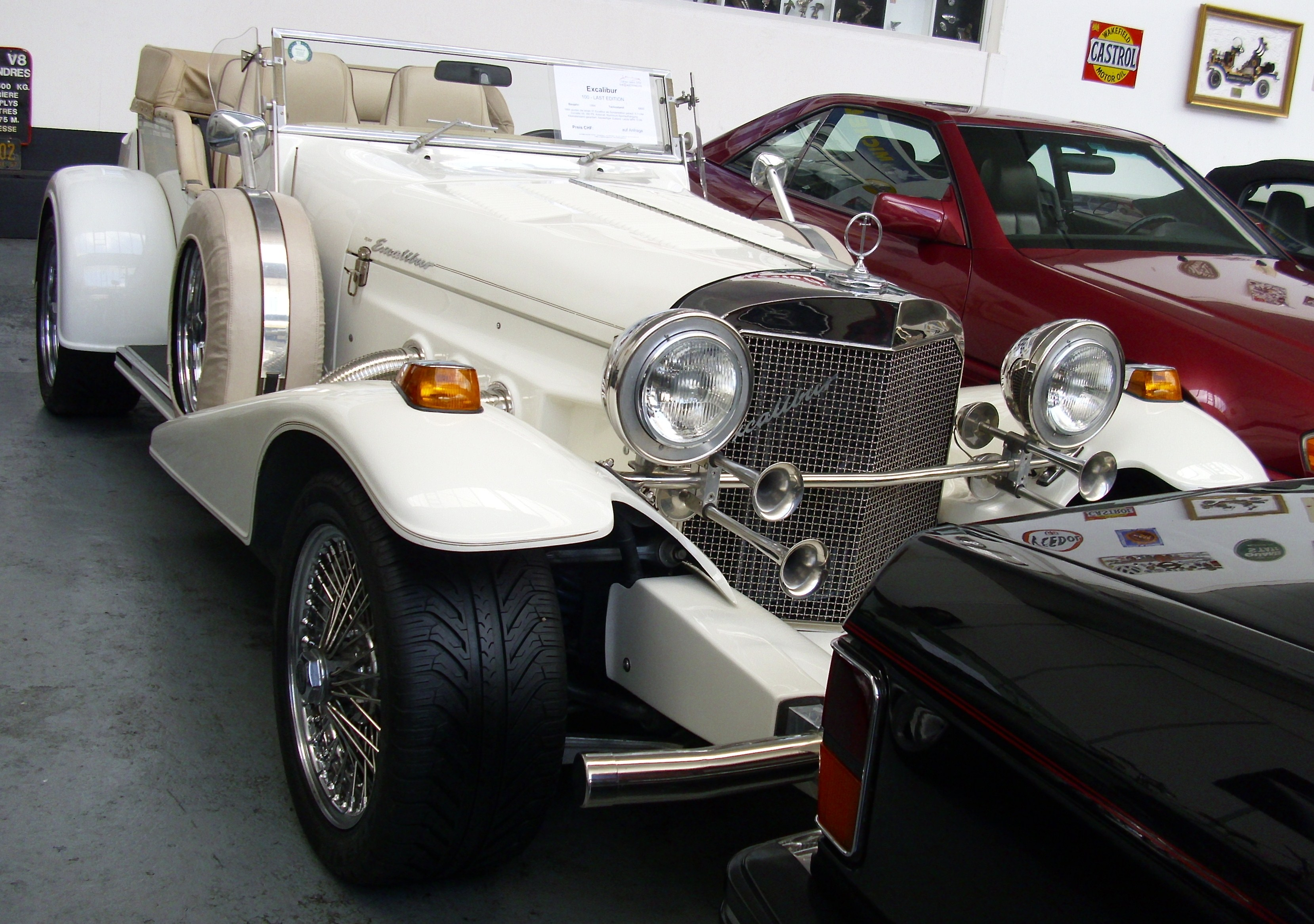
The Excalibur Limited Edition 100 from the early 1990s, a modernized Series III Roadster

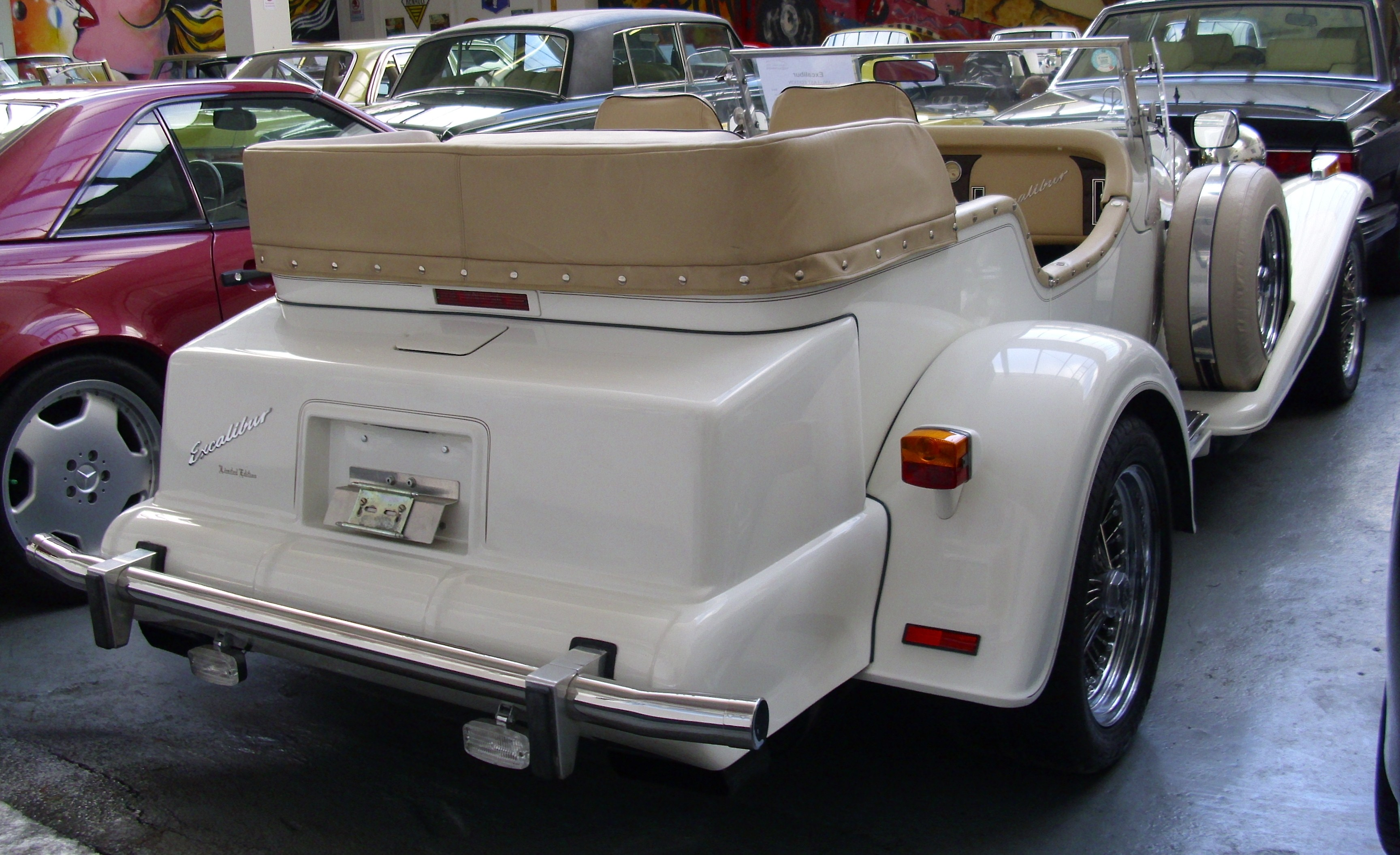
Rear view of an Excalibur Limited Edition 100

== Series IV ==
Introduced for the 1980 model year, this was the first significant redesign of the Excalibur. With the Phaeton representing the lion's share of the production, a Roadster was not available until the 1981 model year. The Series IV has a more angular, heavier look more reminiscent of the 500K/540K than the SS/SSK which inspired the initial three series. The Series IV was also the first Excalibur to feature wind-up windows, and thanks to a considerably longer wheelbase even the Roadster was now a four-seater. To stay abreast of emissions rules, Excalibur switched back to General Motors' small-block V8, this time using the 305 cu in (5,001 cc; 5.0 L) version with 155 hp SAE (116 kW). The only transmission option was a three-speed automatic. With this generation, the side cowl exhausts were no longer functional, unlike on earlier Excaliburs.

In 1984, to celebrate the company's 20th anniversary, a special edition was released. Limited to fifty examples, these are all painted in two-tone white over gray with a matching gray Connolly leather interior.

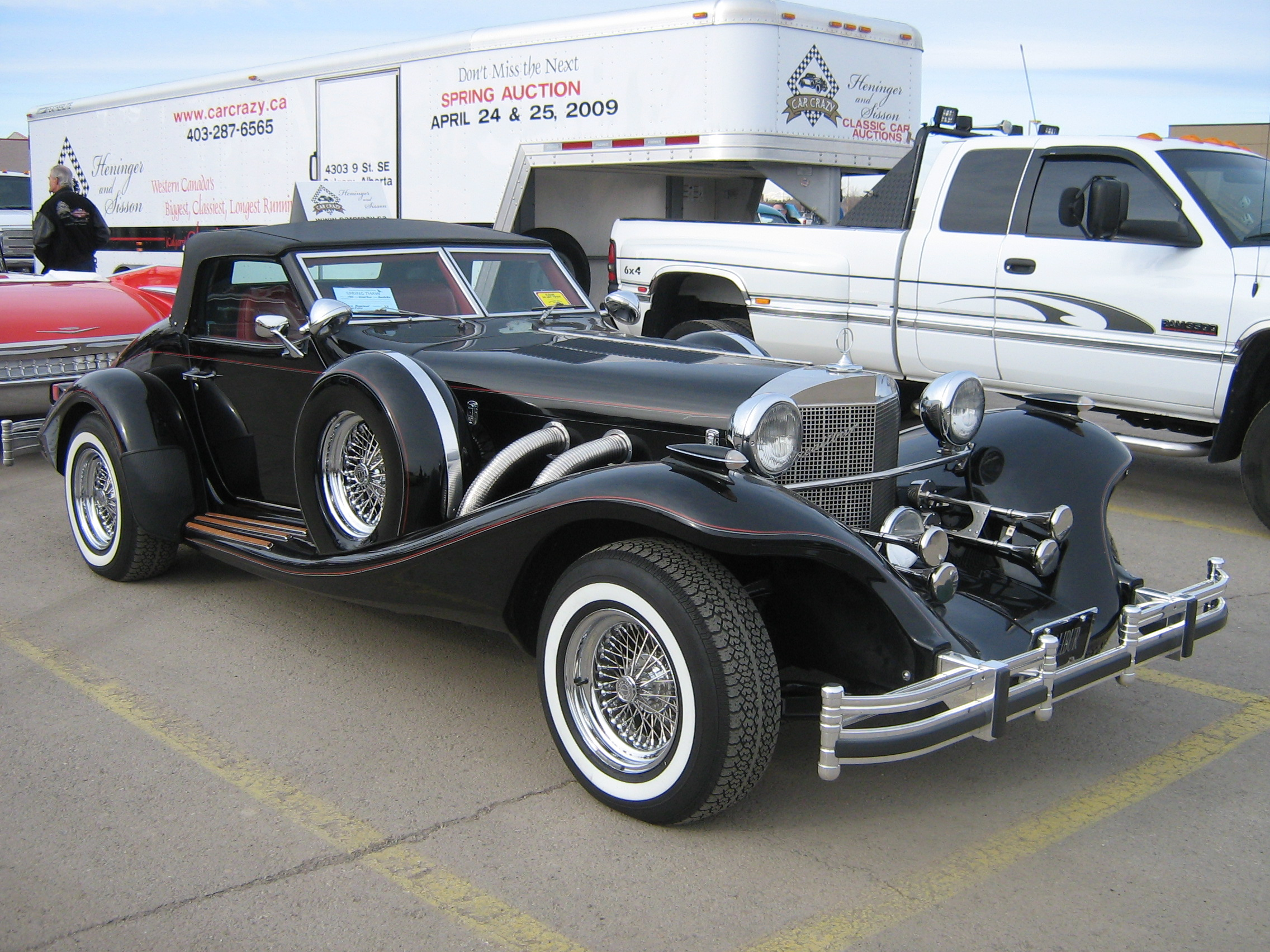
Series IV Roadster (1982)

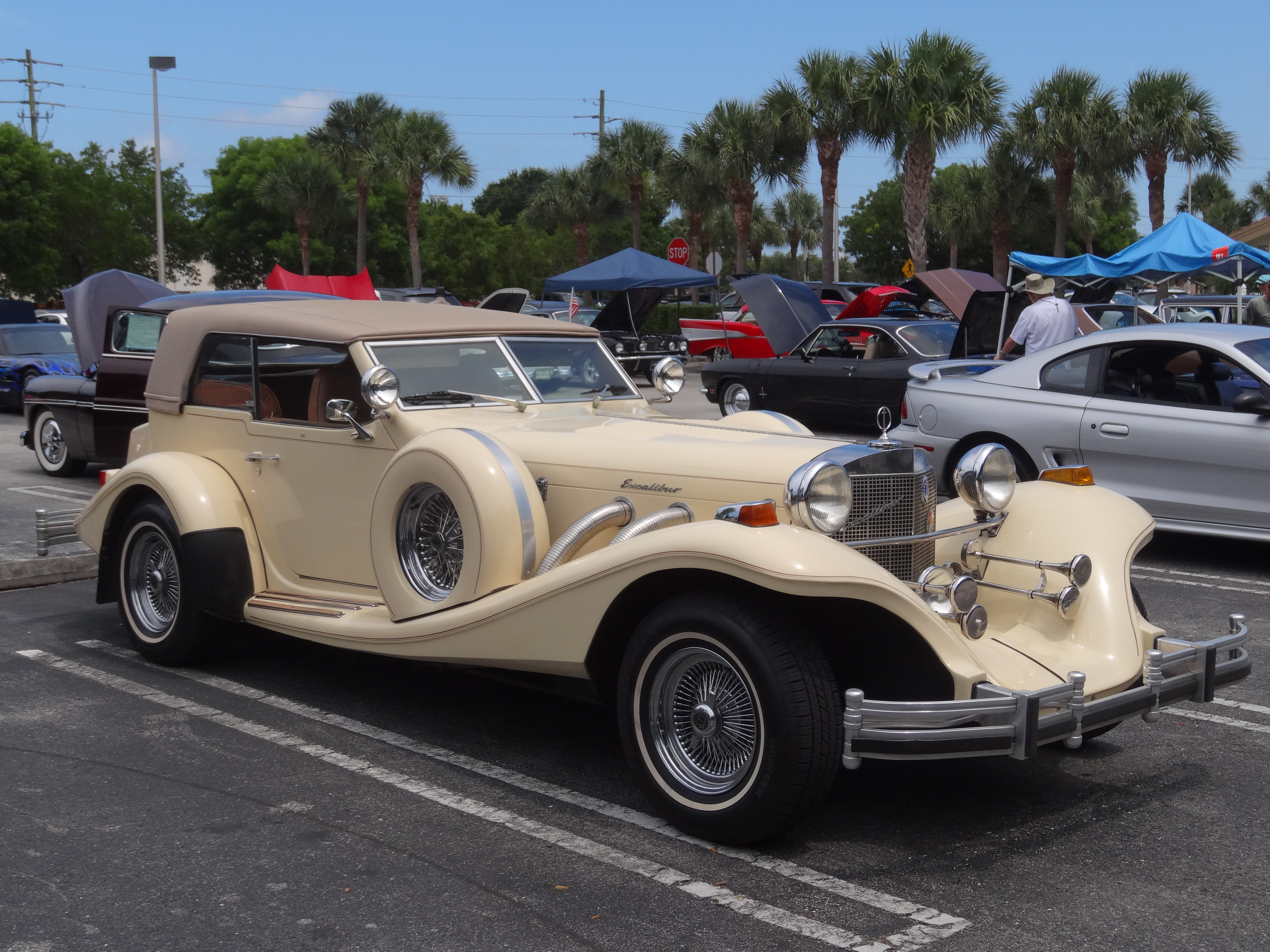
Series IV Phaeton (1982)

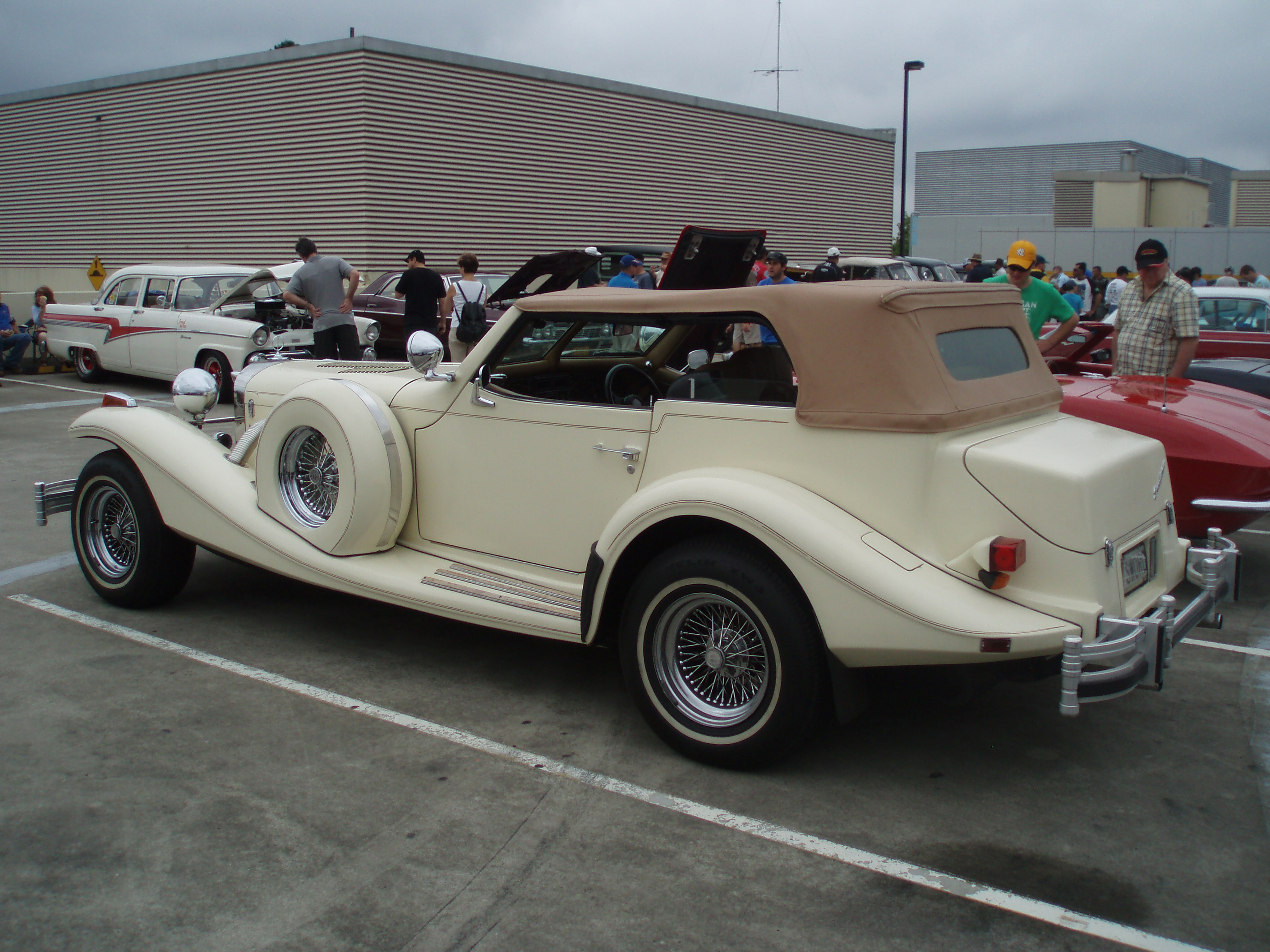
Series IV Phaeton (1984; rear view)

== Series V ==
The Series V continued Excalibur's pattern of a significant revision every five years, although the Series V was mostly just a better equipped Series IV, using more bespoke parts at the interior. For 1986, the Excalibur benefitted from the introduction of the centre, high-mounted stop light. After the Excalibur company went bankrupt in 1986, it was reformed in 1987, with the new company keeping the Series IV in production and also introducing a four-door sedan and a long-wheelbase limousine. 101 sedans and 13 limousines were built of the Series V, with a handful more being turned out after the bankruptcy. 9 of the sedans were also turned into long wheelbase limousines by outside coachbuilders in 1988 and 1989.

Excalibur kept building the Series V until they went bankrupt again in 1990. Two attempts were made to start production again in 1991, but no cars were built until 1994, when the Series VI was introduced.

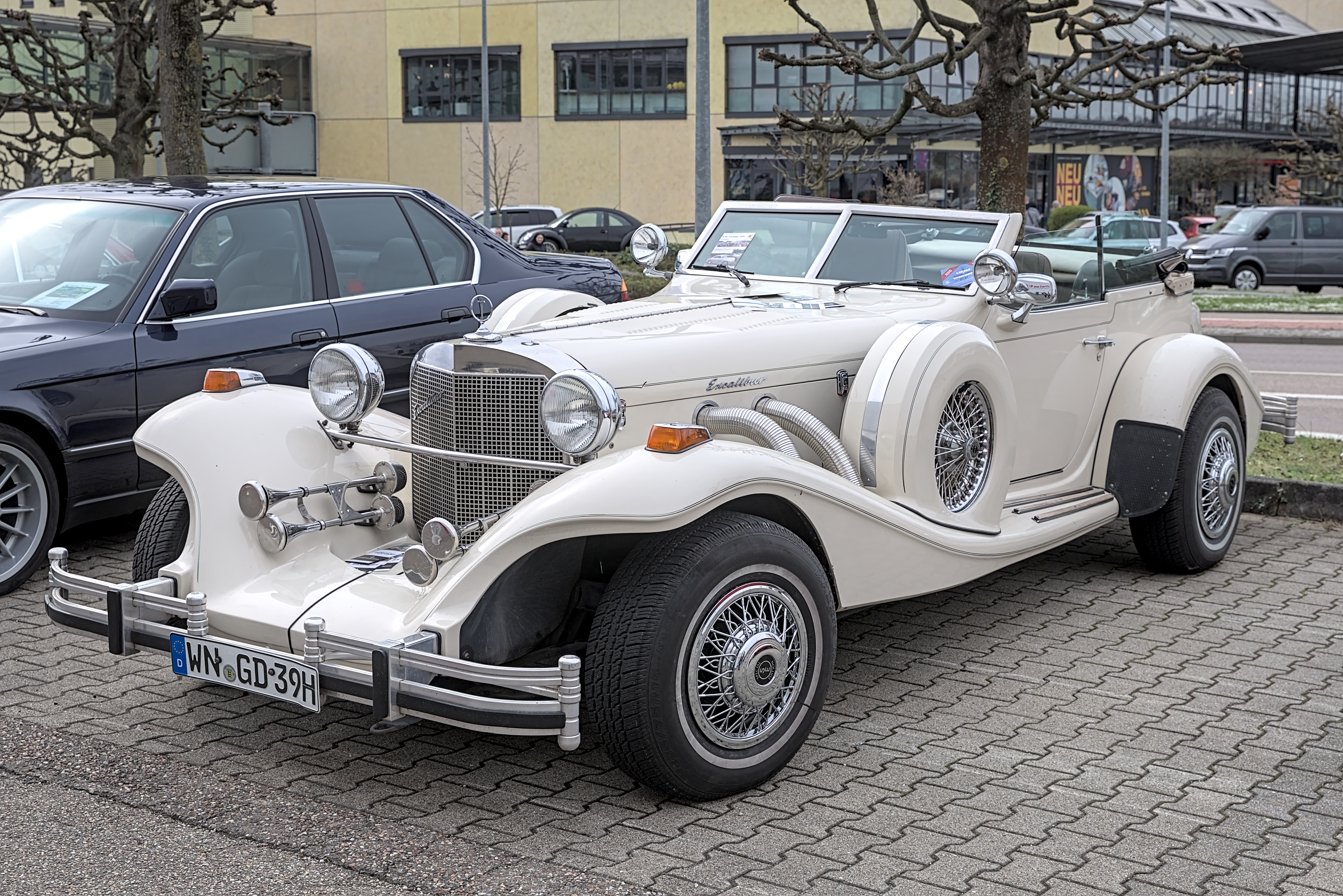
Series V Convertible

== Series VI ==
After Udo and Jens Geitlinger's limited relaunch of Excalibur in 1992, they introduced the Series VI in 1994. A lightly updated Series V, the Series VI was fitted with the then-current Corvette's LT1 engine, producing 300 hp (224 kW; 304 PS). Around two dozen had been built by the time production halted for good in 1997.

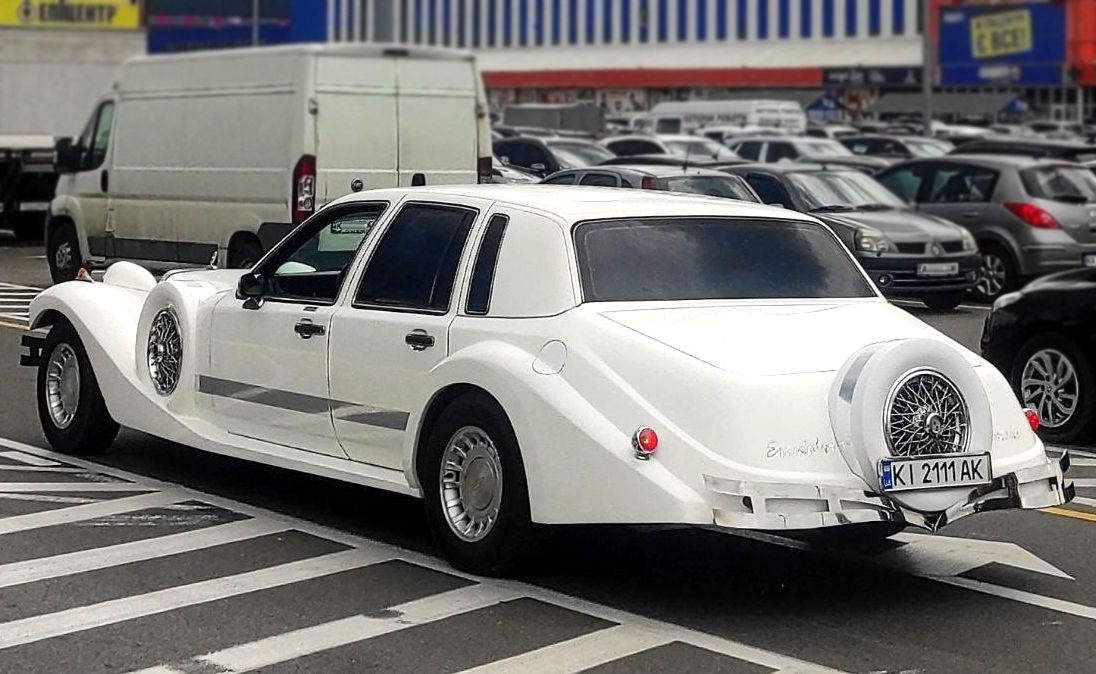
Series VI

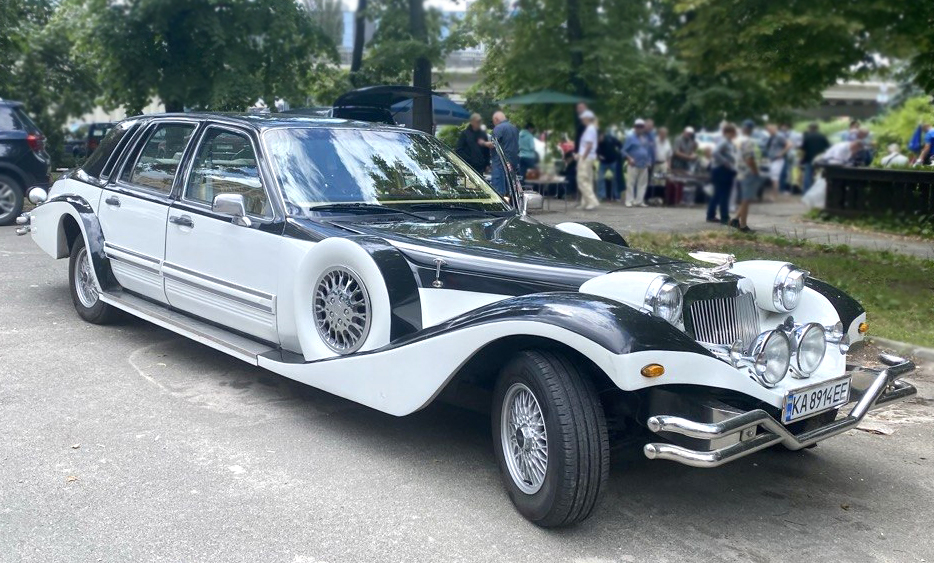

== See also ==
- Clénet Coachworks
- Cumberford Martinique
- Desande
- Sherwood Egbert
- Stutz Blackhawk
- Zimmer (automobile)
