= Irving Taylor (songwriter) =

American screenwriter and songwriter

Irving Taylor (April 8, 1914 – December 3, 1983) was an American composer, lyricist, and screenwriter.

== Biography ==
He was born Irving Goldberg in 1914 in Brooklyn, New York, United States.

A member of ASCAP (American Society of Composers, Authors and Publishers) since he was a teenager, he enlisted in the US Navy the day after the Attack on Pearl Harbor. While in uniform, he and Vic Mizzy wrote entertainments for personnel stationed at the Staten Island Navy Yard, and he later served as a quartermaster on an LST involved in African and European invasions during World War II. He married Katharine Snell, an American dancer, model and actress, on 20 September 1942 and they had two children. He had changed his last name by 1936 from Goldberg to Taylor.

He lived and worked in New York City until enlisting in the Navy. After the war ended, he began writing and producing for television (The Carmen Cavallero Show, The Freddy Martin Show, and several situation comedies), and maintained homes in both New York City and Los Angeles, California, until finally settling in Los Angeles around 1956.

In the late 1950s, Taylor wrote words and music for a series of novelty albums which were released on the Warner Bros. label. The first was Terribly Sophisticated Songs, which parodied various genres of the popular music of the time, and featured "Pachalafaka," which was covered by Soupy Sales and broke into the Top 40 of the Billboard Hot 100 in 1958. The following year saw The Garbage Collector in Beverly Hills, which parodied work songs "for the odd job holder." This was followed by Drink Along With Irving, which parodied songs about alcohol such as "You Go To My Head" and "The Whiffenpoof Song." In 1959, Warner Bros. released The Whimsical World of Irving Taylor, a compilation of the most popular of the numbers from the preceding albums. Many of the arrangements for all of the Warner Bros. albums were written by Henry Mancini.

Taylor formed a publishing company, Kiss Music Co., in the late 1950s. Also a member of ASCAP, "Kiss" was an anagram made from the first letters of Taylor's wife and children's first names. Kiss Music Co. now does business in Philadelphia, Pennsylvania, where Taylor's son Stephen resides. His daughter Suzanna died on January 5, 1995, in Wilmington, North Carolina, where her children continue to reside.

Taylor died on December 3, 1983, at the age of 69, in Westlake Village, Los Angeles County, California. He is buried at Mt. Sinai Memorial Park in Los Angeles.

His wife Katharine died on 21 August 2001 in Wilmington, North Carolina.

== Partial list of songs (lyrics unless otherwise noted) ==
- "Swing, Mr. Charlie" (1936) with Harry Brooks and J. Russel Robinson
- "There's a Faraway Look in Your Eyes" (1938)
- "My Heart Is a Violin" with Emery Deutsch and J. Russel Robinson
- "Three Little Sisters" (1942) with Vic Mizzy
- "Take It Easy" (1943) with Albert De Bru (Xavier Cugat) and Vic Mizzy
- "One-zy Two-zy" (1946) with Dave Franklin
- "Everybody Loves Somebody" (1947) with music by Ken Lane. Recorded by several artists, most successfully by Dean Martin in 1964.
- "Caramba! It's the Samba" (1947) with Edward Pola and George Wyle
- "So Dear to My Heart" (1947) with music by Ticker Freeman
- "Quicksilver" (1949) with George Wyle and Eddie Pola
- "(Everybody's Waitin' for) The Man with the Bag" (1950) with Dudley Brooks and Hal Stanley
- "Ain't Nobody's Business But My Own" (1950)
- "Wandering Swallow" (1951) with Harold Stevens; a Baião, the English version of the Brazilian song "Juazeiro" by Luiz Gonzaga and Humberto Teixeira
- "Am I a Toy or a Treasure" (1954) with Arthur Altman and Louis C. Singer
- "Give Me Your Word" (1955) with George Wyle
- "Pachalafaka" (1958), words and music
- "Kookie, Kookie (Lend Me Your Comb)" (1959) words and music
- "A Christmas Toast" with Ken Lane

== Discography ==
- Terribly Sophisticated Songs: A Collection of Unpopular Songs for Popular People, arrangements by Henry Mancini. Warner Bros. Records B-1210 (1958)

== Movies ==
- "Three Little Sisters" (1944) lyricist; eponymous song also appeared in Memoirs of a Geisha (2005)
- "So Dear to My Heart" (1948) lyricist
- "Sudden Fear " (1952) lyricist
- "Walk the Dark Street " (1956) writer
- "The Pied Piper of Hamelin" (1957) writer
- "The Lord Don't Play Favorites" (TV) (1956) writer

== Television ==
- The Bob Newhart Show (1961–1962) writer
- The Dean Martin Show (1965) composer
- F Troop (1965) lyricist, with William Lava
- Jonathan Winters Show (1967–1969) writer
- The Muppet Show (1976) composer

== Notes ==
1. Some sources, such as The Big Bands Database, record his birth as August 4, 1914, but census, passport and family records all confirm April 8 as the correct date.
