= Caramba! It's the Samba =

Single by Peggy Lee with Dave Barbour and the Brazilians
- A-side: "Caramba! It's the Samba" "Baby, Don't Be Mad at Me"
- Released: 1948
- Label: Capitol
- Songwriters: Taylor; Wyle; Pola

"Caramba! It's the Samba" is a song written by Irving Taylor, George Wyle, and E. Pola that was a hit for Peggy Lee with Dave Barbour and the Brazilians in 1948.

== Critical reception ==
Professional ratings
Review scores
Source	Rating
Billboard	favorable

Billboard reviewed Peggy Lee's recording (Capitol 15090, coupled with "Baby, Don't Be Mad at Me"), writing: "'Caramba! It's the Samba' gets a top-flight Lee vocal loaded with humor and infectious toe-tapping rhythm."

== Track listing ==
78 rpm (Capitol 15090)

(2607) Y
No.	Title	Writer(s)	Note(s)	Length
1.	"Caramba! It's the Samba"	Taylor; Wyle; Pola	Peggy Lee with Dave Barbour and the Brazilians; Vocal with samba orchestra

(2559) Z
No.	Title	Writer(s)	Note(s)	Length
1.	"Baby, Don't Be Mad at Me"	Mack David; Ticker Freeman	Peggy Lee with Dave Barbour and his orchestra Vocal with orchestra

== Charts ==
Chart (1948)	Peak position
US Billboard Records Most Played by Disk Jockeys	13
