= Berlina =

Berlina may refer to:

- Sedan (automobile), a style of passenger car
- Alfa Romeo 1750 Berlina, an automobile produced from 1968 to 1977
- Holden Berlina, an automobile produced by the Holden subsidiary of General Motors since 1984
- Opel Rekord Berlina, a specification level of the Opel Rekord automobile produced by the Opel subsidiary of General Motors
- Phillips Berlina, a neo-classic car produced from 1980 to 1983
