= Skip (curling) =

Captain of a curling team

Curling positions
Skip
Third
Second
Lead

In the sport of curling, the skip is the captain of a team. The skip determines strategy, and holds the broom in the house (target area) to indicate where a teammate at the other end of the curling sheet (playing area) should aim the stone. The skip usually throws the last two stones in the fourth position, but may play in any other position.

Sometimes "skipper" is used; it can also be abbreviated as "S". It's also used as a verb ("skips", "skipped", "skipping").

It is conventional to identify a team by the name of the skip.

== Responsibilities ==
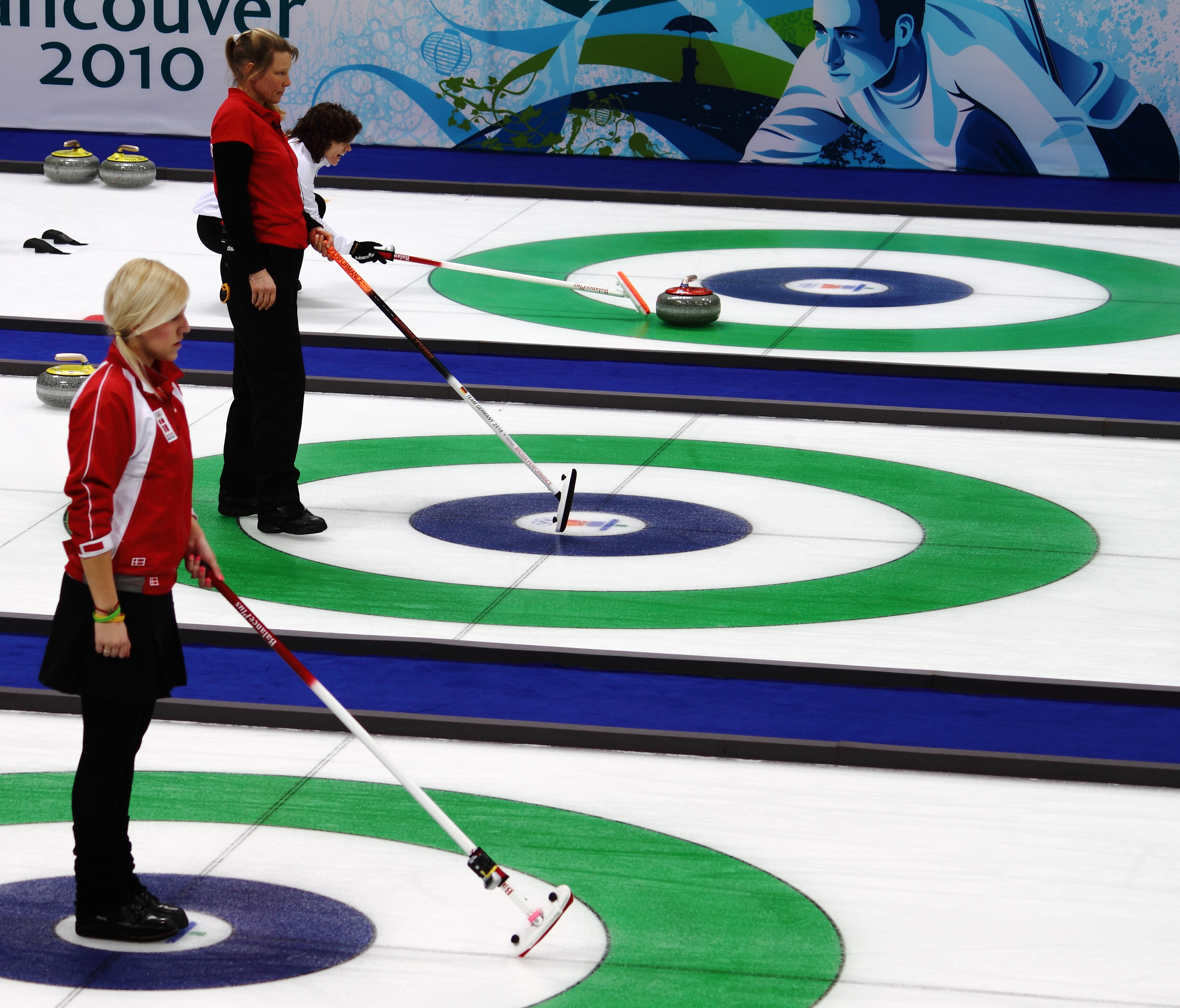
Skips Madeleine Dupont, Andrea Schöpp, and Mirjam Ott hold their brooms on the ice at the 2010 Winter Olympics.

Overall, the skip leads the team and provides strategic direction. The skip calls shots for teammates to play, through verbal direction and physical gestures. In many cases, skips communicate the planned trajectory of the shot by tapping their broom on the ice, and motion to other stones in the playing area if those are involved in the planned shot. The skip usually determines the required weight, turn, and line of the stone, and holds the broom for the throwing player to aim at.

As each stone is delivered, the skip calls the line of the shot and communicates with the sweepers as the stone travels down the sheet. The skip gauges the stone's path and calls to the sweepers to sweep to maintain the stone's path. In most cases, the skip, playing the fourth stones, must be able to deliver these last stones comfortably—a difficult task in that the last stones are usually the most crucial to the end. As the person throwing last stones, the skip must also have a good repertoire of shots and the ability to execute many types of shots at will.

As the game progresses, the skip must assess different aspects of the game, such as timing of the rocks and characteristics of the curling sheet—and use these to choose the best shots and tactics. The skip should be able to read the ice and call the game accordingly, taking into consideration the ice conditions. Moreover, the skip must understand the playing style and strengths of each player on their team. As captain of the team, the skip uses knowledge of the teammates to call shots according to their abilities and orients the team's strategy towards its strengths. The skip must also observe the opposition's gameplay and pinpoint their strengths and weakness to shape the team's strategy to put the opposition at the least advantage.

== Notable moments ==
- The winner of the inaugural Brier was a serendipitous team of four skips.
- While skips are more commonly fourths, they have also been leads (e.g. Margaretha Sigfridsson), seconds (e.g. Peter de Cruz), and thirds (e.g. Randy Ferbey).
- At the 2015 Tim Hortons Brier, the inaugural Team Canada struggled to a 2-3 start. In a rather unusual switcheroo, they reordered their lineup with a new skip, and ended up winning the championship.
- For the 2018–19 season, Kerri Einarson formed a new team of all former skips. They would end up winning four consecutive Scotties Tournament of Hearts championships (2020, 2021, 2022 & 2023).
- "Absentee skips" have occurred at various level of the sport. Here are some notable examples:
  - Team Roth competed in the 2019–20 season with former vice Tabitha Peterson as skip.
  - At 2019 Champions Cup, Team Hasselborg of Sweden competed with Eve Muirhead of Scotland as skip.
  - At the 2022 Hearing Life Tour Challenge, mate Oskar Eriksson skipped his team to victory after skip Niklas Edin couldn't play due to knee injury.

== Bibliography ==
- Weeks, Bob (2006). Curling for Dummies, 2nd Edition. Mississauga, Ontario: John Wiley & Sons Canada, Ltd. ISBN 978-0-470-83828-0.
