= I Love the Way You Say Goodnight =

1951 Doris Day song

"I Love the Way You Say Goodnight" is a popular song. The music was written by George Wyle, the lyrics by Edward Pola. It was published in 1951.

The song was heard in the film Lullaby of Broadway starring Doris Day and Gene Nelson. Day recorded the song on December 8, 1950, with the Norman Luboff Choir and the Buddy Cole Quartet. That version was issued by Columbia Records (catalog number 39198), and was included on the soundtrack album for the film. Dean Martin recorded a contemporaneous version, which was issued on Capitol Records.
