= I Didn't Slip, I Wasn't Pushed, I Fell =

"I Didn't Slip, I Wasn't Pushed, I Fell" is a popular song. The music was written by George Wyle, the lyrics by Edward Pola. It was published in 1950.

The recording by Doris Day was released by Columbia Records as catalog number 38818. It first reached the Billboard Best Seller chart on June 16, 1950, and lasted one week on the chart, at number 28.

Other recordings were made by Jo Stafford and by Bing Crosby. The Crosby version was recorded on April 8, 1950, for Decca Records and it charted briefly in the number 22 position.

== Song form ==
The song is in the common form of an 8-bar introductory verse followed by a 32-bar chorus. Unusually, though, the "let me tell you about it" framing device that usually happened at the end of the verse instead appeared in the chorus, framing the bridge.
