= Zimmer (automobile) =

Specialty luxury carmaker in New York

Zimmer Motor Cars Corporation
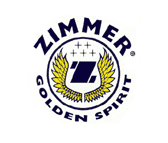
- Company type: Neo-classic Automobile Manufacturing
- Industry: Automotive
- Genre: Retro style automobiles: Sedans, coupes, convertibles, and limousines
- Founded: 1980
- Founders: Paul Zimmer
- Fate: Bankruptcy in 1988 and rights sold to Art Zimmer in 1997, who launched Art Zimmer Neo-Classic Motor Car Company (a.k.a. Zimmer Motorcars)
- Headquarters: Original corporate offices and manufacturing in Pompano Beach, Florida, subsequently Syracuse, New York; Manufacturing in Cambridge, Maryland and Syracuse, New York, United States
- Area served: United States and global
- Key people: Paul Zimmer and son, Bob Zimmer
- Products: Neo-classic automobiles
- Revenue: $25 million in 1980s
- Owner: Art Zimmer
- Number of employees: 175 in 1980s
- Parent: Zimmer Corporation
- Divisions: Original Zimmer owners also ran Black Fin Yachts, Zimmer Motor Coach, Zimmer Motor Homes, Zimmer Recreational Products, Windsor Mobile Homes

Zimmer Motor Cars was a manufacturer of neo-classic automobiles. The company was originally incorporated in Ohio in July 1980 as the Zimmer Motor Cars Corporation. In August 1980, it was registered as a Foreign For Profit Corporation in the state of Florida under file number 846776. The company was a subsidiary of the Zimmer Corporation, then based in Pompano Beach, Florida.

The company declared bankruptcy in 1988 and restructured on a smaller scale. In 1997, the brand name and remaining company assets were sold to Art Zimmer (who is no relation to the original Zimmer family that founded the company), whose Art Zimmer Neo-Classic Motor Car Company, continued producing Zimmer-badged automobiles until 2020.

== History ==
Zimmer Motorcars Corporation was established in 1980 as a manufacturer of neo-classic automobiles.

The idea for this automobile was initially drawn on a napkin at a private dinner between Paul Zimmer, chairman and President of Zimmer Corporation and Robert "Bob" Zimmer, Paul Zimmer's son, an employee and shareholder of the company. Paul Zimmer drew what was to become the Golden Spirit on a napkin, handed it to Bob Zimmer and told him that not only were they going to build a neo-classic automobile, but that the younger Zimmer would be responsible for all functions of the operation and ongoing supervision of Zimmer Motor Cars Corporation. By 1982, Bob Zimmer had become the president of Zimmer Motor Cars Corporation.

At its peak in the 1980s, Zimmer Motor Cars Corporation had 48 dealers in 28 states, employed 175 people and generated $25 million in annual revenue.

=== Models ===
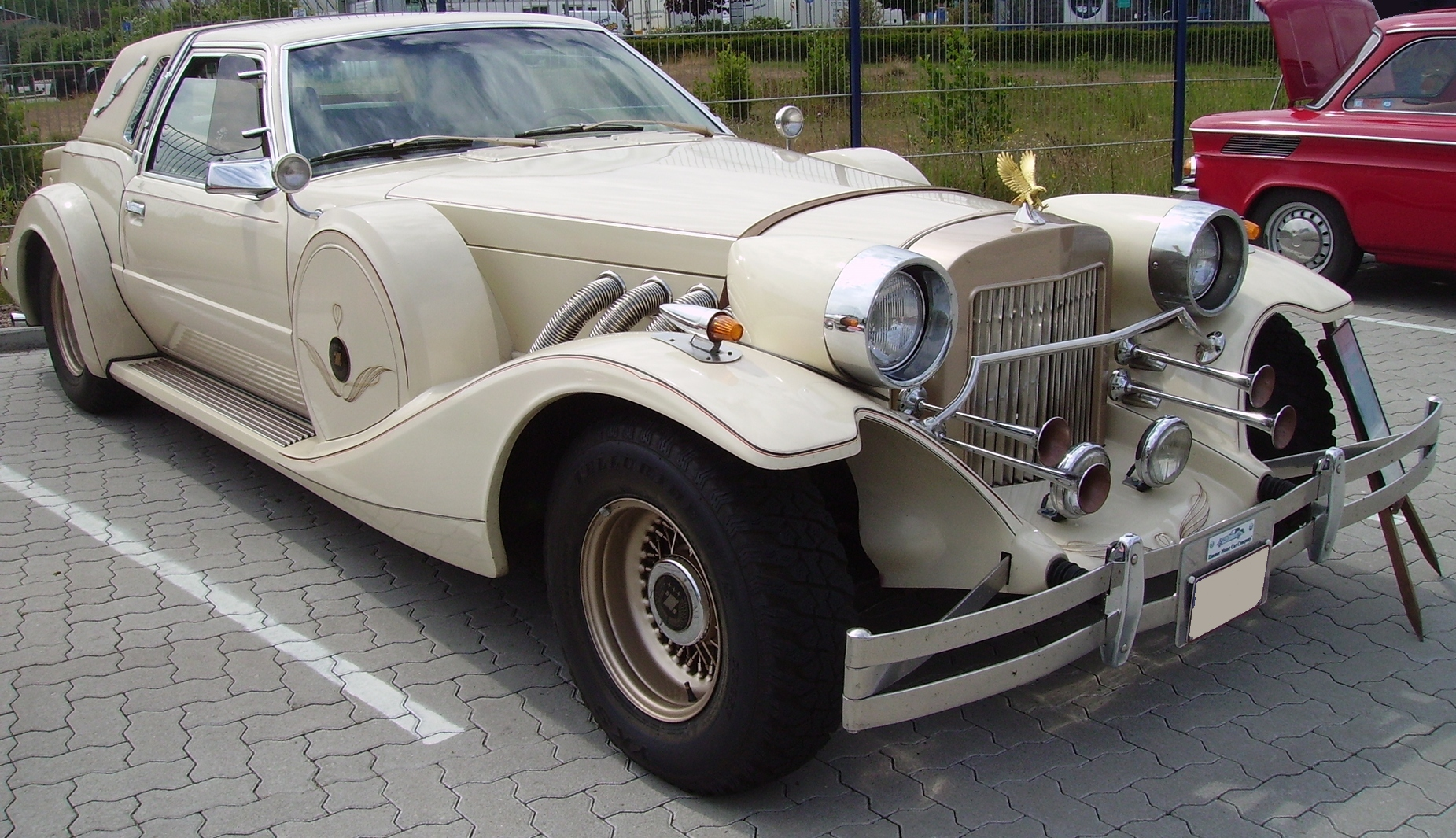
Zimmer Golden Spirit

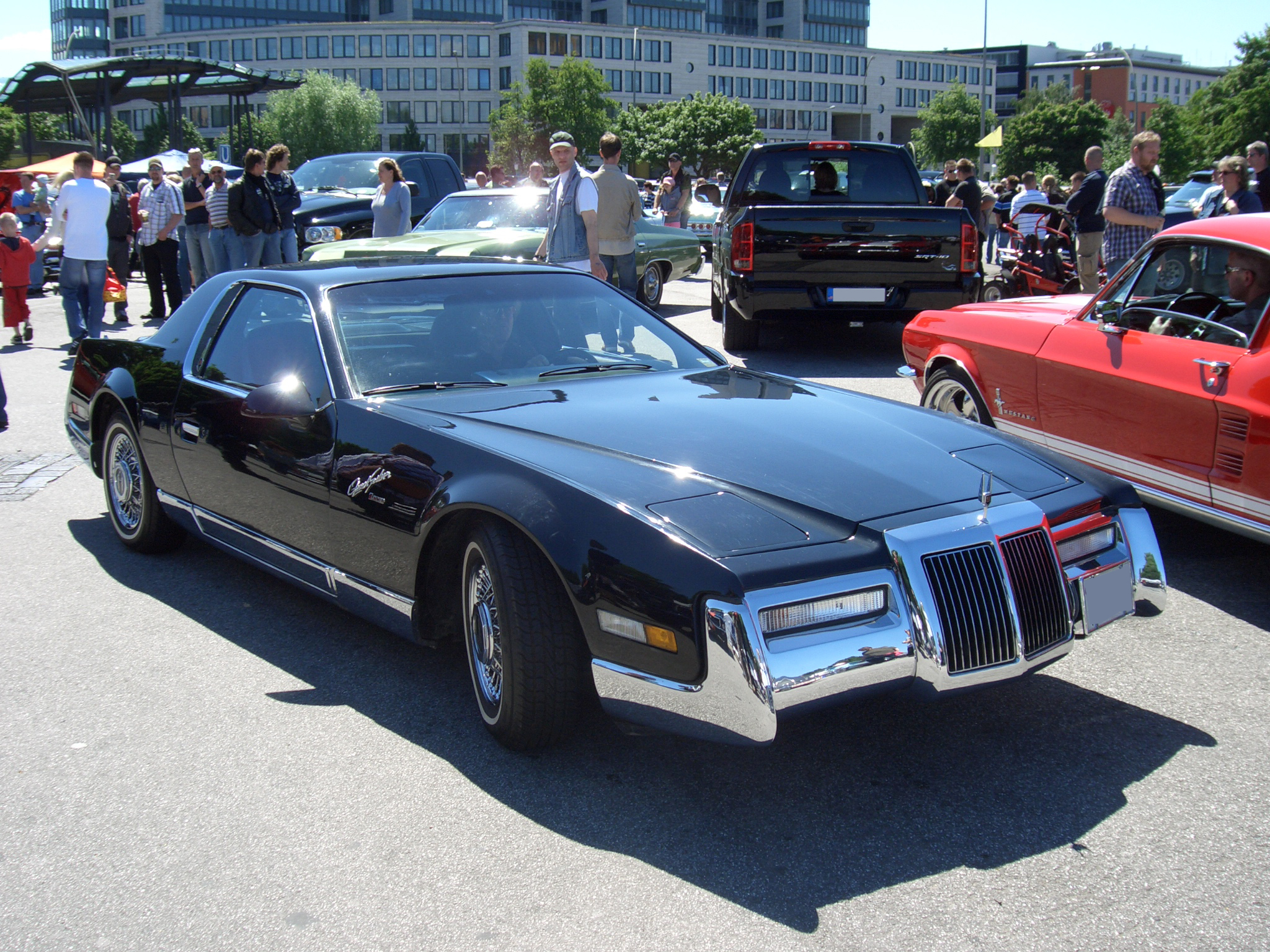
A Zimmer Quicksilver

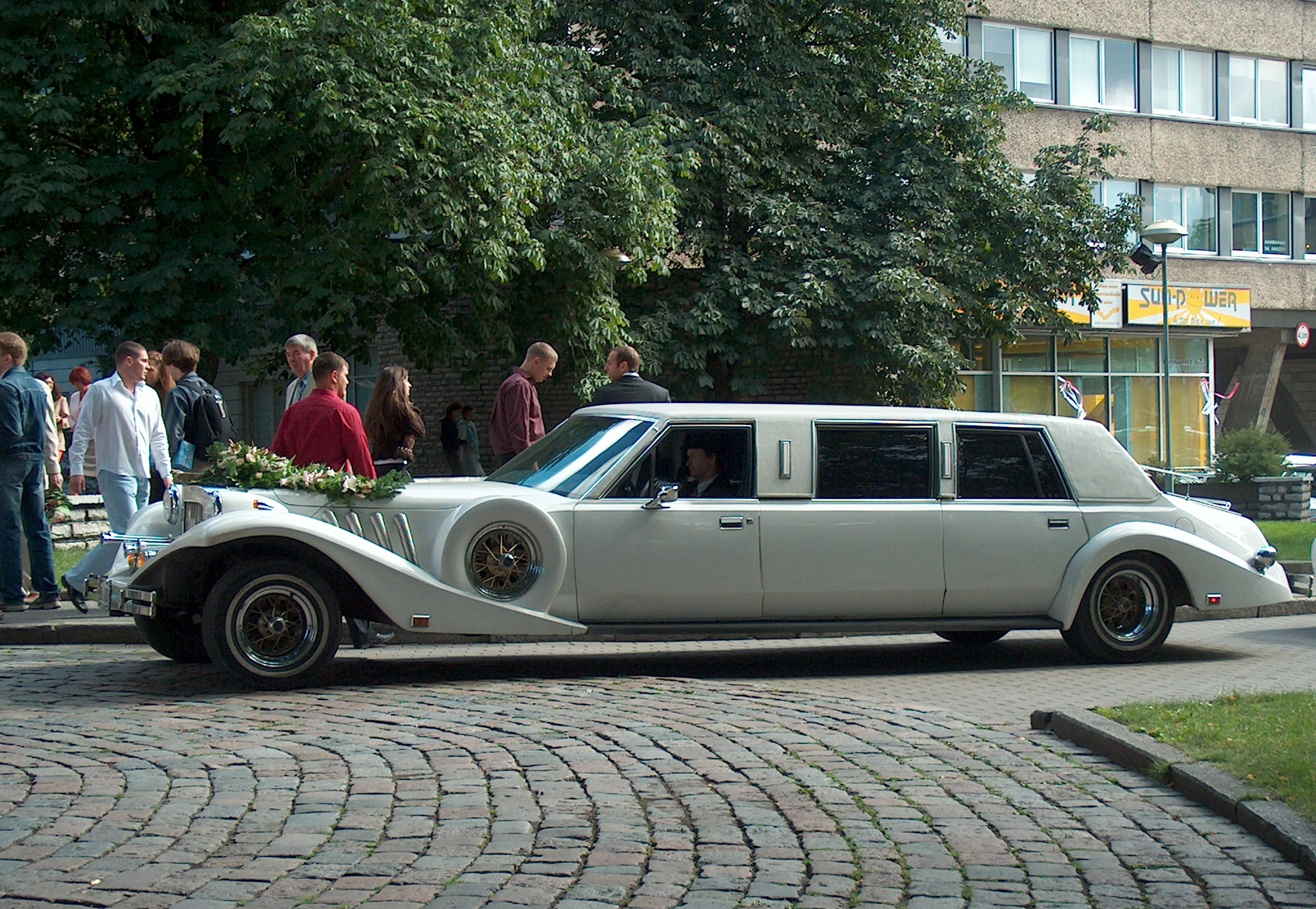
A wedding Zimmer limousine in Tallinn, Estonia

The Zimmer Golden Spirit was the flagship of the Zimmer Motor Cars Corporation during its production run from 1980 to 1988. While the original Golden Spirit was built using a Ford Mustang drivetrain, production began by cutting off or removing all body panels except the doors and roof. The chassis was then extended by 38" and new steering and brake components installed. Fiberglass body panels were manufactured by Zimmer and fitted along with chrome bumpers and other exterior parts. Interiors were re-trimmed in leather with Recaro seats and Nardi steering wheels, but otherwise carried the standard Mustang instrumentation. While the majority of Golden Spirits were two-door hardtops, there were limited numbers of convertibles and t-top variants built with at least one four-door sedan and "personal limousine" known to have been built. The Mustang vehicle identification number was retained so as to meet all the required US safety features at the time. Zimmer sold the vehicles on their own manufacturer's certificate of origin. Depending on the jurisdiction in which the vehicle was first registered, it may have been titled as a Zimmer Golden Spirit or a Ford Mustang.

The second Zimmer Motor Cars Corporation product was the mid-engined Pontiac Fiero-based Quicksilver, which was built between 1986 and 1988. The Quicksilver is a two-seat personal luxury car designed by former General Motors designer Don "D.A." Johnson. Each Quicksilver was constructed from a new Fiero donor car, which was dismantled and structurally modified at the Zimmer factory by adding a 13" section behind the rear wheels and an additional 16" just behind the front suspension. Power steering, which was not available on the Fiero, was added by Zimmer. The Fiero bodywork was replaced by a new fiberglass body with dramatic new styling with a long, sloping nose and pop-up hidden headlamps. Large chrome front and rear bumpers were manufactured in Taiwan and plated in Florida. The re-designed interior was trimmed in leather and wood, and the new body had increased luggage space in the front and rear. The Fiero Vehicle Identification Number was retained. It met all the required US safety features at the time. While Zimmer sold the vehicles on their own manufacturer's certificate of origin, depending on the jurisdiction in which the vehicle was first registered, it may have been titled as a Zimmer QuickSilver or a Pontiac Fiero. The retail price of the Quicksilver in 1986 was $51,950.

Both models were built in the same factory in Pompano Beach, Florida, on simultaneous production lines, from 1980 to 1988. Though no factory production records are known to exist, it is believed, based on a survey of surviving cars (and their Zimmer Motor Cars-added production plates), that approximately 1,500 Golden Spirits and 170 QuickSilvers were built.

=== Original company failure ===
In 1987, parent company Zimmer Corporation reported a $9.9 million loss on sales of $98.8 million and its subsidiaries included Zimmer Motor Cars Corporation, Zimmer Motor Coach Corporation and Zimmer Recreational Products Corporation. Also in 1987, Zimmer Corporation divested itself of its Black Fin Yacht division and cited the motor coach division as its poorest performer, which was responsible for more than $13 million in losses since 1985. The Zimmer Motor Car Corporation reported a 23% increase in sales in 1986 over 1985. In May 1988, Zimmer Corporation filed for reorganization under Chapter 11.

Zimmer announced in October 1988 that Chairman Paul Zimmer would resign on January 1, 1989, due to poor health, but would continue as a director of the company. At that time a group of employees, led by former Zimmer Corporation general counsel Terry McMahan (appointed president and CEO in August 1988) were working to guide the company out of Chapter 11. By the time Zimmer emerged from Chapter 11 in July, 1989, all but the Cordele, Georgia van conversion plant had been closed and just over 100 employees remained.

=== Company acquired ===
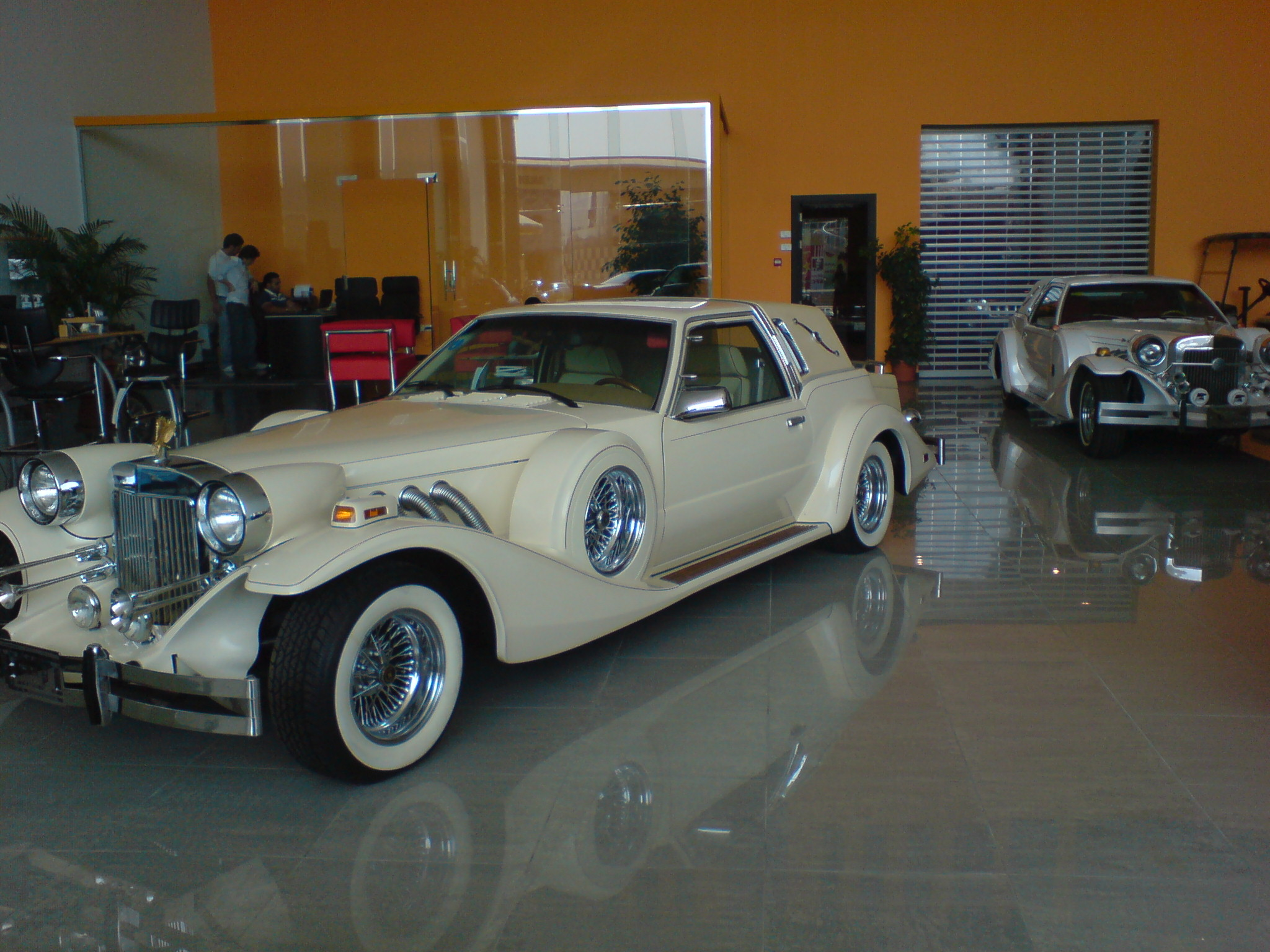
Zimmer Showroom in Jeddah, Saudi Arabia

In September 1996, Art Zimmer (who is no relation to the original Zimmer family) became aware that an automobile had been manufactured which shared his surname. Shortly thereafter, he acquired the "Zimmer Motorcars" name and various Zimmer Motorcars Corporation materials and established the Zimmer Motor Car Club, primarily for Golden Spirit owners, with little to no support for QuickSilver owners. By 2001, there were over 500 members in the club. As of 2023, the club is defunct.

In 1997, Art Zimmer, president and CEO, started the Art Zimmer Neo-Classic Motor Car Company after buying a model in a local automobile dealership. The company, also known as Zimmer Motor Car Company, stopped production in 2020 but had built 10 to 20 automobiles each year and was headquartered in Jamesville, New York.

=== Retro style – modern chassis ===
The later Zimmer Golden Spirit retailed for $175,900 and was billed by the company as "the most awesome automobile in the world". It was the first four-door convertible produced in decades and was based on a Lincoln Town Car chassis. The company also offered a two-door model that was built on a Ford Mustang chassis which retailed for $109,900. The advantage to owners is that the automobile could be serviced at any Ford or Lincoln Mercury dealer. This included full service and Ford parts and warranty work. Additionally, the automobile has all the latest safety and modern engineering features that were inheritable from the basis model. Because Zimmers are built atop the existing chassis, the company could use the legal certification of the Town Car and Mustang, obviating the need for separate crash and emissions certification by Zimmer.

=== Manufacturing facilities ===
Art Zimmer established the company's manufacturing facilities in Cambridge, Maryland, and in December 1998 the first Zimmer Golden Spirit produced by the newly formed Zimmer Motorcars rolled out of the factory.

During 2000, the company established a Syracuse presence when two of its operations, Rosenthal and Chadwick, a metal fabricating company, won the contract to supply heavy-duty steel bumpers, badge bars, and associated support parts. For the first time since 1934, when Franklin Automobile Company closed, automotive manufacturing had returned to Syracuse.

In May 2000, Zimmer and Sam Vigliotti, president of Sam's Auto Body and Service Center on West Genesee Street, located in Syracuse's historic Automobile Row, announced that the latest Zimmer model, currently in development, would be manufactured at Sam's Auto Body. Because of this alliance, by 2001, the company was able to manufacture a new vehicle every six to eight weeks.

=== Distribution network ===
When the Art Zimmer Golden Spirits were available, they were manufactured "to order" and sold through an international distribution network. There were distribution centers in several states in the United States, as well as throughout the world such as Saudi Arabia.

== See also ==
- Clénet Coachworks
- Cumberford Martinique
- Desande
- Excalibur (automobile)
- Stutz Blackhawk

== Sources ==
- Art Zimmer's Golden Spirit by Travellady magazine
- Zimmer Registry
