= Am I a Toy or a Treasure =

"Am I a Toy or a Treasure" is a popular song written by Arthur Altman, Louis C. Singer and Irving Taylor.

The best-selling version of the song was recorded by Kay Starr in 1954. It reached number 17 in the UK Singles Chart in October 1954, and number 74 in the annual chart for that year.
