= Edward Pola =

American actor and songwriter (1907–1995)

Edward Pola (June 23, 1907 – November 3, 1995) was an American actor, radio and television producer, and songwriter. He is credited with co-writing Andy Williams' 1963 hit "It's the Most Wonderful Time of the Year."

== Biography ==
Pola was born Sidney Edward Pollacsek in New York City, the son of Ida (Friedmann) and Alexander Pollacsek, who were Hungarian Jews.

In the 1920s, Pola began to write songs. He scored one of England's first sound films, Harmony Heaven (1930). Toward the end of the decade, he moved to the United States. He produced a radio comedy, The Alan Young Show, as well as dramatic radio programs. He continued as a producer, moving to television in the 1950s.

His most famous songs include:

- "I Didn't Slip, I Wasn't Pushed, I Fell" (co-written with George Wyle)
- "I Love the Way You Say 'Good Night'" (co-written with George Wyle)
- "I Said My Pajamas (and Put On My Pray'rs)" (co-written with George Wyle)
- "It's the Most Wonderful Time of the Year" (co-written with George Wyle)
- "Quicksilver" (co-written with George Wyle and Irving Taylor)
- "Till The Lights Of London Shine Again" (co-written with Tommie Connor)
- "Caramba! It's the Samba" (co-written with George Wyle and Irving Taylor)

In the 1980s, Pola taught creative writing to elementary school students at Smiley Elementary School in Redlands, California.

Pola died in Jackson County, Oregon at 88.
