= I Said My Pajamas (and Put On My Pray'rs) =

Song, published 1949

"I Said My Pajamas (and Put On My Pray'rs)" is a popular song with music by George Wyle and lyrics by Edward Pola. It was published in 1949. The song describes somebody who is in love, but whose descriptions about what she does are full of switcheroos, indicating her absentmindedness.

Four hit versions made the charts in 1950: by Tony Martin and Fran Warren, by Ray Bolger and Ethel Merman, by Margaret Whiting, and by Doris Day.

The recording by Tony Martin and Fran Warren was recorded on November 18, 1949, and released by RCA Victor Records as a 78 rpm record and a 45 rpm record. The B-side was "Have I Told You Lately that I Love You?". The record first reached the Billboard Best Seller chart on January 20, 1950, and lasted 13 weeks on the chart, peaking at number 5.

Dick Powell sang the song at the end of the 35th episode of the radio show Richard Diamond, Private Detective, "The Elaine Tanner Case", which aired on February 12, 1950, to his character's lover, Helen, to whom he crooned a song at the end of each episode; in this case she'd said to him, as she went to change into something to go out and celebrate in, "Oh, Rick, there's a new song on the piano. Why don't you try it?"

The recording by Ray Bolger and Ethel Merman was recorded on January 4, 1950, and released by Decca Records. It first reached the Billboard Best Seller chart on March 17, 1950, and lasted two weeks on the chart, peaking at number 25. The flip side was "Dearie".

The recording by Margaret Whiting was released by Capitol Records. It first reached the Billboard Best Seller chart on March 10, 1950, and lasted one week on the chart, at number 24.

The recording by Doris Day was recorded on January 13, 1950, and released by Columbia Records. It first reached the Billboard Best Seller chart on March 10, 1950, and lasted one week on the chart, at number 27.

Gösta Rybrant wrote Swedish lyrics titled "Jag fick en kyss til godnatt". Bibi Johnson with Carl Henrik Norin's orchestra recorded it in Stockholm on April 14, 1950. It was released as a 78 rpm record on His Master's Voice.
