= Comedic device =

Pattern or structure that makes something funny

A comedic device is a technique or structure used to make something funny. They are often used in comedy.

== List of comedic devices ==
=== Repetition ===
Repetition is the essential comedic device and is often used in combination with other devices to reinforce them. The "callback" in comedy writing—in which a statement or theme is recalled as the punchline or close of a scene—is a classic example of the tension and release that are possible using repetition. It is also the basis for "Englishman, Irishman, and Scotsman" jokes, where repetition is used to set up a modus operandi and build tension before the Irishman (usually assumed to be the stupid one) provides the resolving juxtaposition.

=== Hyperbole, or overstatement ===
Hyperbole, an overstatement, is a figure of speech in which statements are exaggerated or extravagant. It may be used to reflect or effect strong feelings or impressions.

=== Understatement ===
An understatement is a figure of speech in which statements are purposely understated. It may be used to indicate the speaker's nonchalance (or obliviousness) regarding an often important or otherwise remarkable situation. It often results in irony where, for instance, the speaker's response to an event does not match how the viewer expects the speaker to react.

=== Double entendre ===
A double entendre is a spoken phrase that can be understood in either of two ways. The first, literal meaning is an innocent one, while the second, figurative meaning is often ironic or risqué and requires the audience to have some additional knowledge to understand the joke.

=== Pun ===
A pun consists of a deliberate confusion of similar words or phrases for humorous effect, whether humorous or serious. A pun can rely on the assumed equivalency of multiple similar words (homonymy), of different shades of meaning of one word (polysemy), or of a literal meaning with a metaphor.

=== Juxtaposition ===
Juxtaposition is a literary technique which causes the audience to compare two elements simply because they are placed next to each other. When the comparison is unexpected, it creates irony. In some cases, this can be created through grammatical ambiguity. For example, success and failure.

=== Mistaken identity ===
The mistaken identity (often of one twin for another) is a centuries-old comedic device used by Shakespeare in several of his works. The mistake can be either an intended act of deception or an accident. Modern examples involving twins include The Parent Trap; The Truth About Cats and Dogs; Sister, Sister; and some films of Mary-Kate and Ashley Olsen. Accidental mistakes with completely different persons include The Government Inspector and its adaptations.

=== Taboo ===
There is a liberating element to saying something that nobody else would say in a civilized environment. Being disgusting or politically wrong in front of an audience can surprise and shock an audience (i.e. jokes about pedophiles).

=== Comic timing ===
Comic timing is the use of pacing and delivery to enhance the effectiveness of comedy. Often, comedy writers and performers insert a dramatic pause or beat to allow the audience to discern the subtext of the comedic situation or joke. Additionally, comics may create a laugh from quick juxtaposition between fast and slow timing such as in the case of George Carlin's delivery in his routine "Seven Words You Can't Say On Television".

=== Slapstick ===
Slapstick is a type of comedy involving exaggerated physical violence. Slapstick was heavily used by Buster Keaton, Charlie Chaplin, Laurel and Hardy, the Keystone Cops, the Three Stooges. Slapstick is also common in animated cartoons such as Tom and Jerry and Looney Tunes.

=== Misdirection ===
A comedian will sometimes use misdirection to have the audience think they're going to say one thing but then get the proverbial rug pulled from under them during the punchline. An infamous example that seamlessly combines taboo, mistaken identity, and misdirection is a 2011 tweet made by British comedian Jimmy Carr on the tenth anniversary of the September 11 attacks: "Sept 11th Date of terrible air disaster. When Eastern Airlines Flt 212 crashed in 1974. Killing 69. No one will forget that in a hurry."

== See also ==
- Joke
- Practical joke device
- Switcheroo
- Comedic genres
