= Operation Quicksilver =

Operation Quicksilver may refer to:

- Operation Quicksilver (deception plan), a World War II plan by the Allied nations threatening an invasion at Pas de Calais
- Operation Quicksilver (1978), an American nuclear test series of eighteen blasts conducted at the Nevada Test Site in 1978 and 1979
- Operation Quicksilver (1990s), a plan to reduce the size of the United States Army in the early 1990s as a result of the end of the Cold War
