= Neoclassic (automobile) =

Modern car that is made somewhat in the image of the classic cars of the 1920s and 1930s

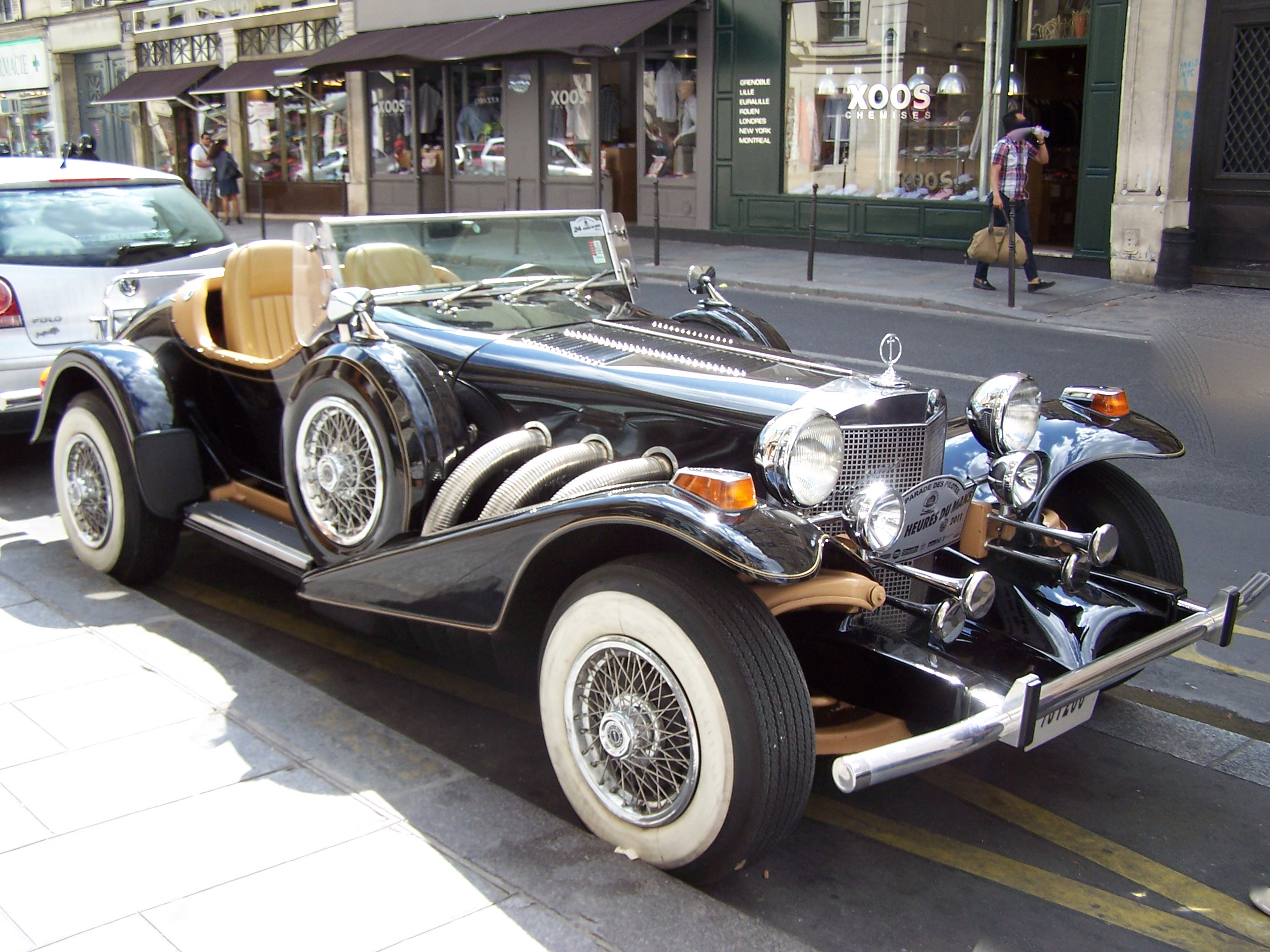
An Excalibur Roadster, considered to be the first "neoclassic" car

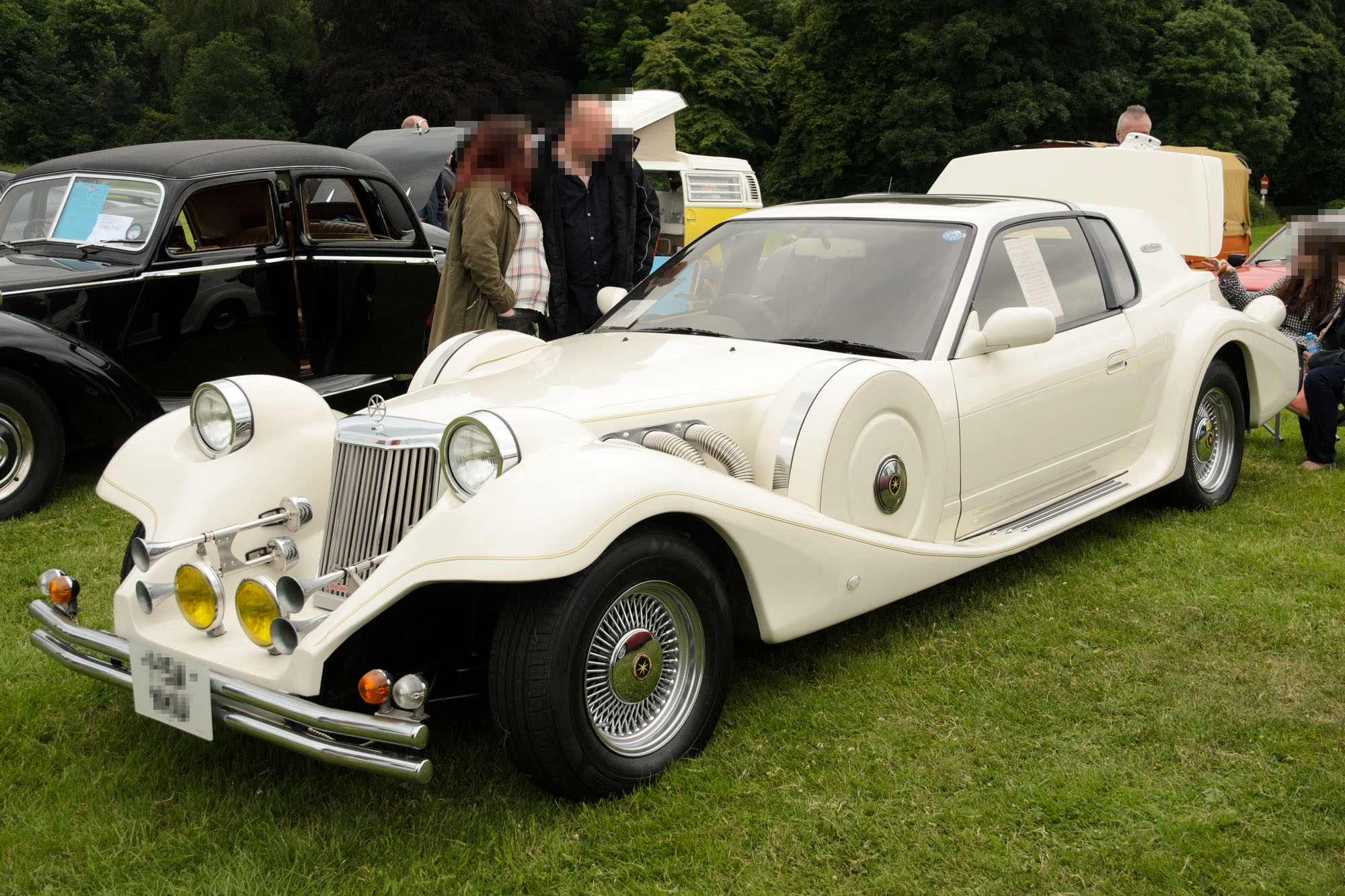
Mitsuoka Le-Seyde

A neoclassic, in automobile circles, is a relatively modern car that is made somewhat in the image of the classic cars of the 1920s and 1930s (as defined by, for example, the Classic Car Club of America) without being necessarily intended as a full replica. They are vehicles that hold the design prior to Ponton design, so they still keep the wheel arches separate from the bodywork.

The term originated with the Excalibur automobile in the 1960s in the United States, and has been applied to cars from a number of makes since then, including Panther, Zimmer, Tiffany, Clénet, Mitsuoka, Desande, Spartan and others. Currently there are more than 30 brands that produce Neoclassic cars.

== See also ==
- Retro-style automobile
