= Switcheroo =

Sudden unexpected variation or reversal, often for a humorous purpose

A switcheroo is a sudden unexpected variation or reversal, often for a humorous purpose. It is colloquially used in reference to an act of intentionally or unintentionally swapping two objects.

As a comedic device, this was a favorite of Woody Allen; for a time, he used so many switcheroos that friends referred to him as "Allen Woody." Some of Allen's switcheroo gags include:

- Carrying a sword on the street; in case of an attack it turned into a cane, so people would feel sorry for him.
- Carrying a bullet in his breast pocket; he claimed someone once threw a Bible at him and the bullet saved his life.

Another example comes from the film The Aristocrats, directed by Penn Jillette and Paul Provenza in 2005, wherein Wendy Liebman pulls "the old switcheroo". Whereas the joke normally is narrated as a vulgar series of actions followed by the clean punch line, Liebman narrates a very aristocratic series of actions followed by a very vulgar punch line.

In his book Gödel, Escher, Bach, Douglas Hofstadter names one of the rules in his version of propositional calculus the Switcheroo Rule, apparently in honour of an Albanian railroad engineer, name Q. Q. Switcheroo, who "worked in logic on the siding". This is in reality the material implication.

== See also ==
- Comic strip switcheroo
- Bait and switch
- I Said My Pajamas (and Put On My Pray'rs)
- Paraprosdokian
- Man bites dog
- The Great Switcheroo
- The Old Switcheroo
- In Soviet Russia
- Transpositional pun
- Rickrolling
