= Tiffany (automobile) =

Defunct American motor vehicle manufacturer

The Tiffany electric car was manufactured by the Tiffany Electric Car Company of Flint, Michigan from 1913-14. The Tiffany electric car was the successor to the Flanders electric car. The vehicle was an open two-seater with sweeping body lines and powered by a Wagner Electric motor. The vehicle steered with a lever and had wire wheels and cycle mud guards. It cost US$750.

The Tiffany was only manufactured from October 1913 to March 1914, after which the Flanders name was revived.
