= Quicksilver (Horace Silver composition) =

Quicksilver is a composition by jazz pianist Horace Silver that he first recorded in 1952, based on his interpretation of "Lover Come Back to Me". "Quicksilver" was performed and recorded live in 1954 at New York City's Birdland by Art Blakey and his Quintet which included Silver, Clifford Brown, Lou Donaldson, and Curly Russell. It appears on the Blue Note Records album by them, A Night at Birdland Vol. 1.

Cannonball Adderley recorded a "near-frantic" version of it which he called "Spectacular". Lee Morgan recorded it with Howard Rumsey's Lighthouse All-Stars group. The song has more recently been performed in tributes to Horace Silver, such as the Arale Kaminsky Quintet in 2014.
