= Desande =

Dutch-British automobile manufacturer

Desande Automobielen BV was a Dutch-British manufacturer of neoclassic automobiles. Their models were styles after high-end automobiles of the 1930s and used modern American drivetrains and suspension systems. While the company was based in Hulst in the Netherlands, the founder Danny G. Vandezande (hence the car's name) came from Hasselt in Belgium, the cars mechanics were American, and the vehicle was built in England. The company's Belgian branch was headquartered in the small town of Schilde.

== History ==
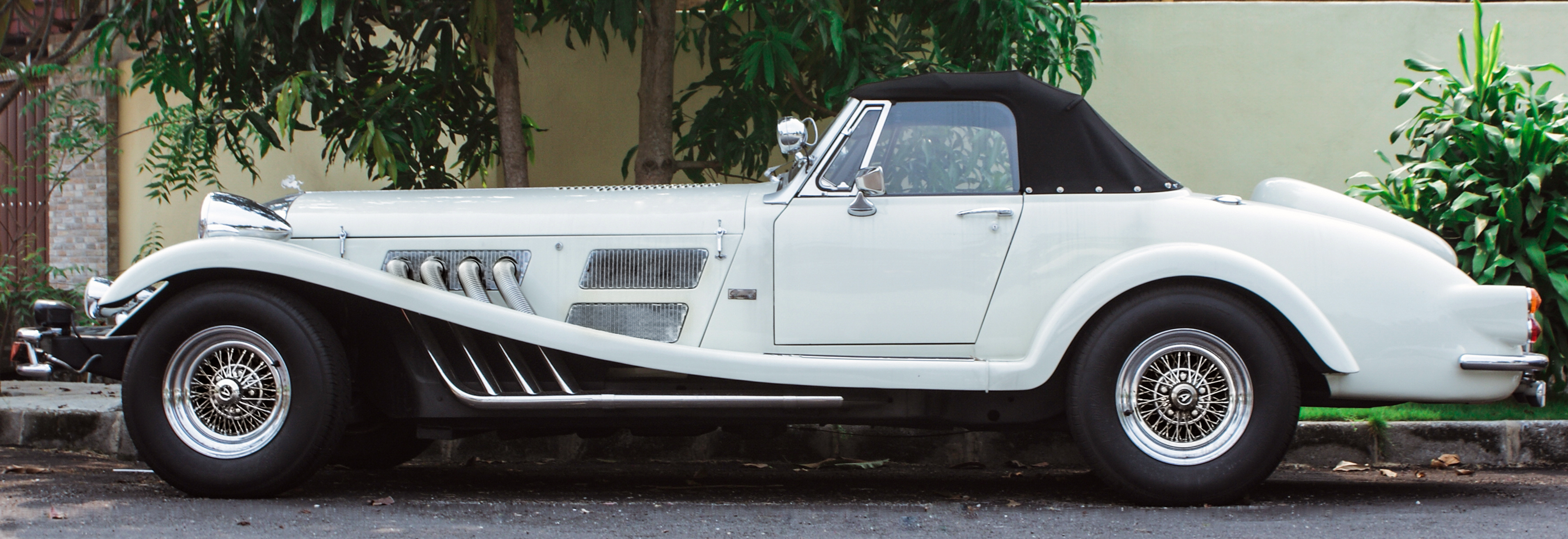
1981 Desande II Roadster (the eighth car built)

Danny G. Vandezande presented the first Desande in 1979; originally, the car was going to be named the "Desande Greta" after his wife. Vandezande felt that only a small British firm would be able to execute the bodywork to a high enough standard, although he was forced to switch manufacturers after the original company selected proved not to have the necessary expertise. In the end, production of the aluminium bodywork was carried out by Grand Prix Metalcraft in North London. GP Metalcraft had been exclusively a supplier of Formula 1 aluminium body parts but expanded to making bodywork for Cobras and other replicas after the fuel crisis placed the future of motor sports in doubt. Staff had been recruited from Vanden Plas and Rolls-Royce, and producing the 2 mm thick aluminium fender took 4 weeks, applying the multiple paint layers took 3 weeks. To further confuse matters, the company behind the car was sometimes identified as JBS Associates, Ltd., also of London.

== The car ==
The Desande Roadster originally used the chassis and mechanicals from the Ford LTD II and Ford Thunderbird. This meant a 2,946 mm (116 in) wheelbase and V8 engines of 4.9 or 5.8 liters coupled to a three-speed automatic transmission. The overall length was 4,960 mm (195 in) and the width 1,860 mm (73 in). Power from the smaller Windsor V8 was 135 PS (99 kW) at 3400 rpm, enough for a claimed top speed of 176 km/h (109 mph). As with many other neoclassics, the car used the doors from the Austin-Healey Sprite/MG Midget.

After only a handful of Ford-based cars had been built, Desande presented the Desande II Roadster in March 1980. The name change indicated a switch to using Canadian-built Chevrolet Caprice/Impala chassis, fitted with a General Motors 5.0-liter V8 mated to a three-speed Turbo Hydra-Matic. The chassis received an additional cross brace and the engine was moved back about two feet (61 cm). The body dimensions remained unchanged, although the wheelbase increased marginally, to 2,945 mm (116 in). Power was up to 157 PS (115 kW) SAE at 4000 rpm, with 326 N⋅m (240 lb⋅ft) SAE torque at 1600 rpm, enough to propel the 1,600 kg (3,500 lb) car to a top speed of 175 km/h (109 mph). The 5.0 was later supplanted by the 5.7-liter V8, reflecting changes on the Chevrolet production line.

The car was always luxuriously equipped, with electrically adjustable Connolly Leather seats, climate control, walnut dashboard, and lambswool carpets. In 1980, cruise control was added. Desande introduced a coupe version at the 1981 Geneva Motor Show. At that time, cars had been exported to Chile, Malaysia, Canada, South Africa and Saudi Arabia. Electrically operated windows became available in autumn 1981. Right-hand drive was available for an additional £4,000, the price of a small car at the time. Grand Prix Metalcraft handbuilt the bodywork out of aluminium aside from the MG Midget-derived central section. The radiator cowl was made from brass while the headlight housings were spun from gilding metal. Engine specifications varied as the General Motors donor cars were changed; in a 1982 road test Desande claimed 136 PS (100 kW) DIN at 3400 rpm. The exterior exhaust manifolds, visible beneath the running boards were originally functional, but the heat proved problematic and caused burns. On later cars, these were replaced by dummy exhausts.

Production was limited to twenty cars per year and a maximum total of 250, with the chassis plates (a gold plated one being mounted near the door) numbered accordingly, but it is unknown how many were actually built. A planned four-seater model never materialized. Grand Prix Metalcraft was working on the fourteenth car in mid-1982, and reportedly they had built 27 examples by 1985, although at the 1985 London Motorfair in October it was announced that 18 had been built. Several sources state that production ended in 1984, but there are cars with titles as late as 1989. Later models are called Desande Caprice.
