= Clénet Coachworks =

Defunct American motor vehicle manufacturer

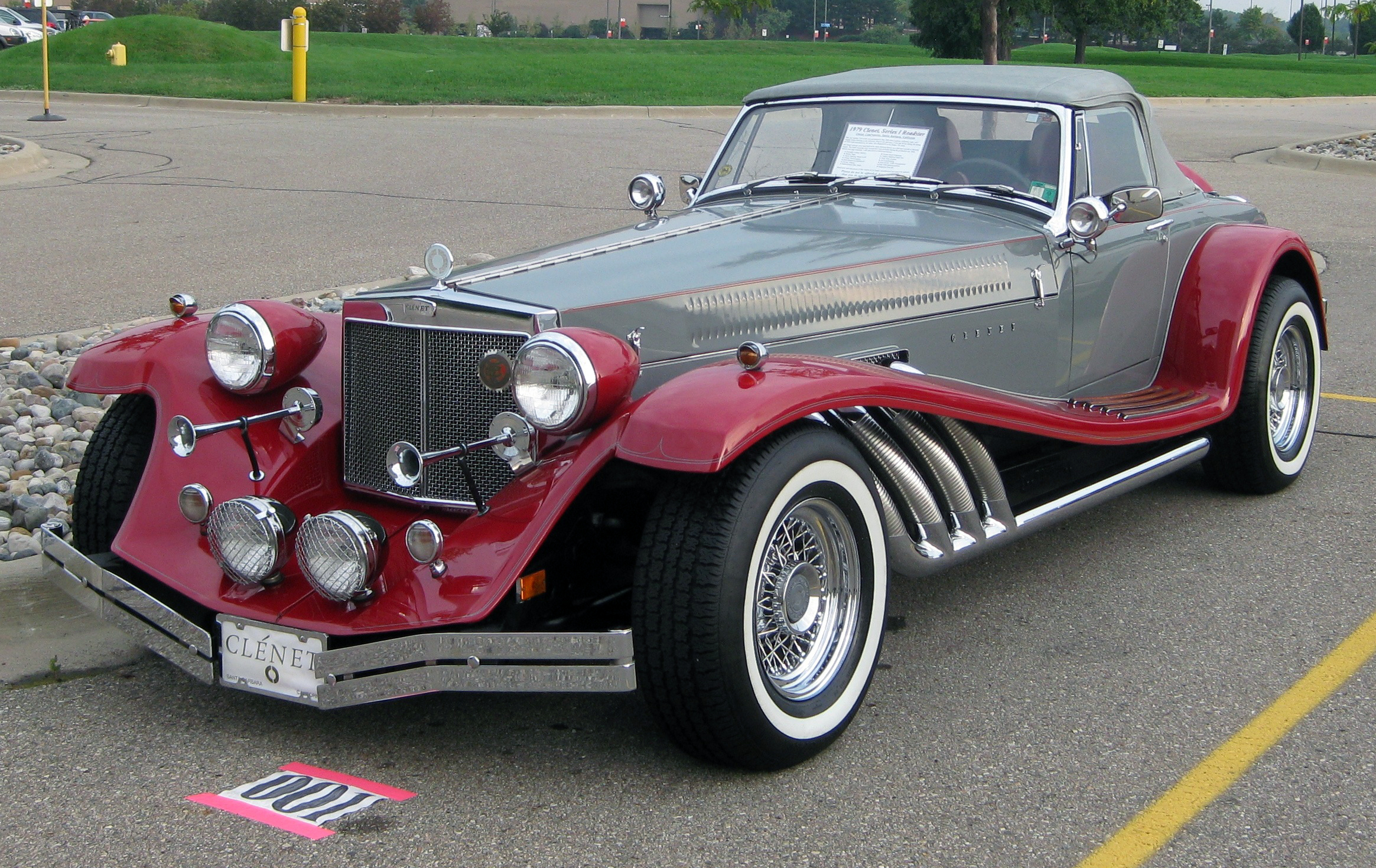
1979 Clénet Series I roadster

Clénet was a manufacturer of Neoclassic automobiles with old retro styling, mixed with modern technology. Each limited-production model was conceived, designed, and produced by a small team in Santa Barbara County, California, in the 1970s and 1980s. The automobile's distinctive styling was based on the high-end automobiles of the 1930s. Despite their retro looks, Clénets used modern drive trains and suspension systems.

== Founding ==
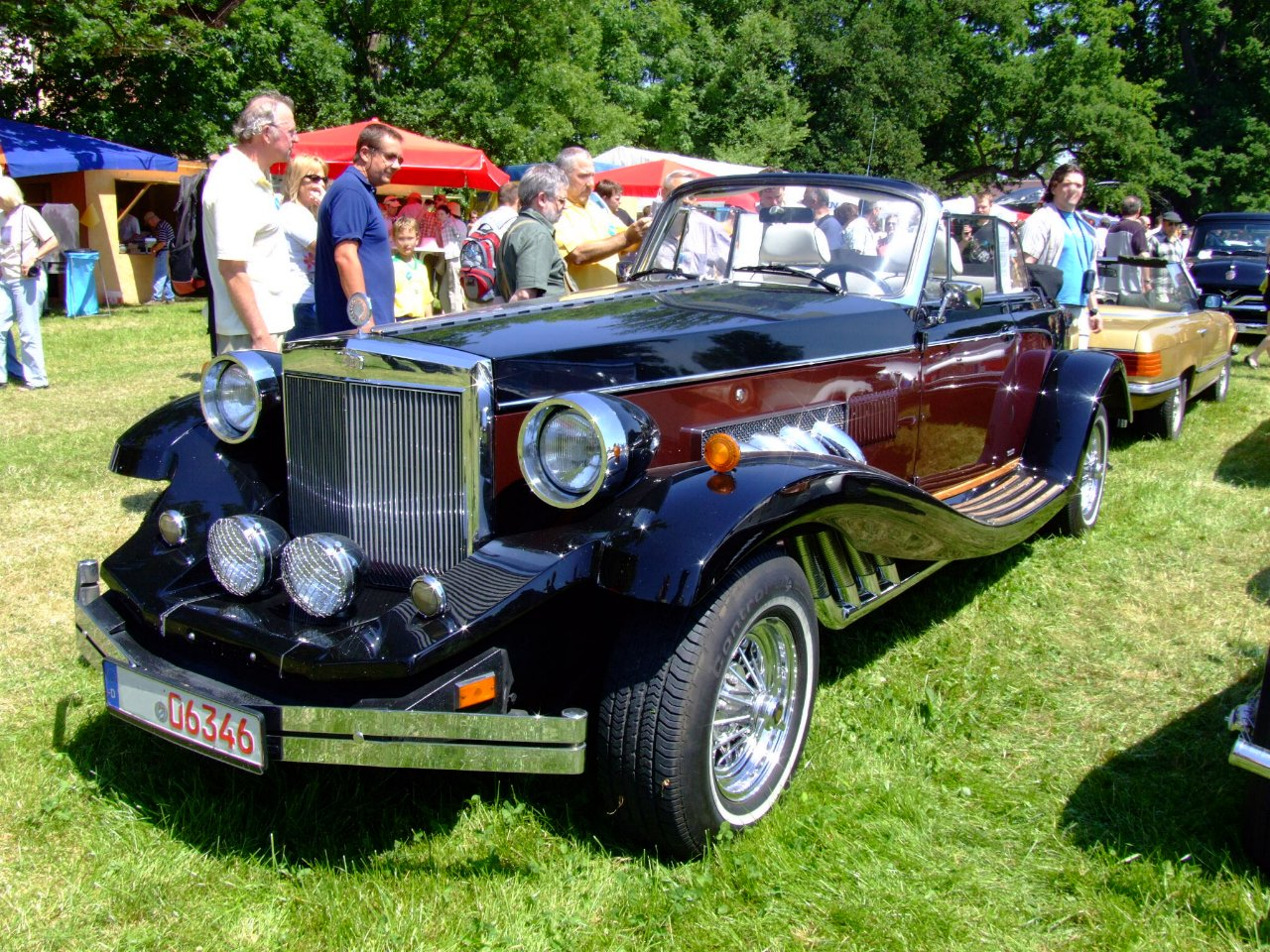
Clénet Series II

Clénet Coachworks, Inc., started in a garage, with investors in 1975. Clénet's first car was called the Series I. It was a roadster designed in a 1930s style. This was then replaced by the heavier-looking Series II in 1979.

Originally the company was moved into an airplane hangar where an assembly line style of production was begun, later to be reborn in a "high tech" facility in Goleta, California, in 1980, where production of Series II continued until the company ran into financial difficulties and ceased production in 1982.

By 1984, Alfred J. DiMora (b. 1956) - owner of Classic Clénet Club and one of the first employees of Clénet - had purchased off the assets and the name of Clénet Coachworks, Inc.; Alain Clénet filed for bankruptcy in 1979. The remaining bodies, tooling and equipment went up for auction.

A total of 250 factory-authorized Clénet Series I, 187 Series II, 65 Series III, and 15 Series IV cars were produced by Clénet Coachworks, Inc. Clénets sold for around US$105,000 in the 1970s. Recently Clénets in excellent or new condition with no mileage have sold for US$100,000 to $150,000.

== Repurchase ==
Alfred J. DiMora purchased the assets of Clénet Coachworks, Inc., revived Clénet and moved the company to a new production factory in Carpinteria, California, in 1982. He re-established the production of the automobile to the same standards of the original, employing many of the original craftsmen from the first Clénet company. Production resumed on the two series of Clénets started at the Goleta facility. Later the Series IV and Series V Designed by DiMora were added to the line of Clénet automobiles.

Clénet Coachworks automobiles offered such features as Italian walnut burl dashboards and etched glass accented by Waterford crystal ashtrays which brought many Clénet models in at over $100,000. Buyers included Farrah Fawcett, Rod Stewart, Ken Norton, Sylvester Stallone and King Hussein of Jordan. Clénets were called "Driven Art" by Automotive Age and the "American Rolls-Royce" by Fortune.

Clénets were still built as of 2023 in Palm Springs, where Sir Alfred J. DiMora resides.

== Honors ==
DiMora's Clénet was selected as the "Official Centennial Car" in 1986, when President Ronald Reagan declared the Centennial Year of the Gasoline-Powered Automobile that it resulted in honors for both DiMora and the Clénet at the Automotive Hall of Fame in Michigan.
