= George Wyle =

American songwriter (1916–2003)

- Born: Bernard Weissman; March 22, 1916; New York City, New York, U.S.
- Died: May 2, 2003 (aged 87); Tarzana, California, U.S.
- Occupation: Orchestral leader - composer

George Wyle (born Bernard Weissman; March 22, 1916 – May 2, 2003) was an American orchestra leader and composer best known for having written the theme song to 1960s television sitcom Gilligan's Island. He is the grandfather of musician Adam Levy.

== Early years ==
Wyle was born to a Jewish family. In the late 1940s and early 1950s his orchestra served as backup for a number of Columbia Records singers, including Doris Day. Some of the recordings (including "I Said My Pajamas (and Put on My Pray'rs)" in 1949 and "I Didn't Slip, I Wasn't Pushed, I Fell" in 1950) were of his own compositions.

== Career ==
Wyle wrote with Sherwood Schwartz The Ballad of Gilligan's Isle, the theme song for Gilligan's Island. He also co-wrote the Christmas song "It's the Most Wonderful Time of the Year" (first recorded by Andy Williams in 1963) and more than 400 other songs. His chief musical collaborator was Eddie Pola.

Wyle served as a musical writer and choral director for the Andy Williams Show and Andy Williams' T.V. Specials from 1962-1978, and infrequently as concert master on Andy Williams' tours in the 1970s. He was also the musical director for The Flip Wilson Show during the early 1970s and also served as music director and arranger for John Denver and the Muppets: A Christmas Together. He served on the Board of Directors of The American Society of Music Arrangers and Composers (ASMAC) from 1979 to his death in 2003.
