= Stutz IV-Porte =

Motor vehicle

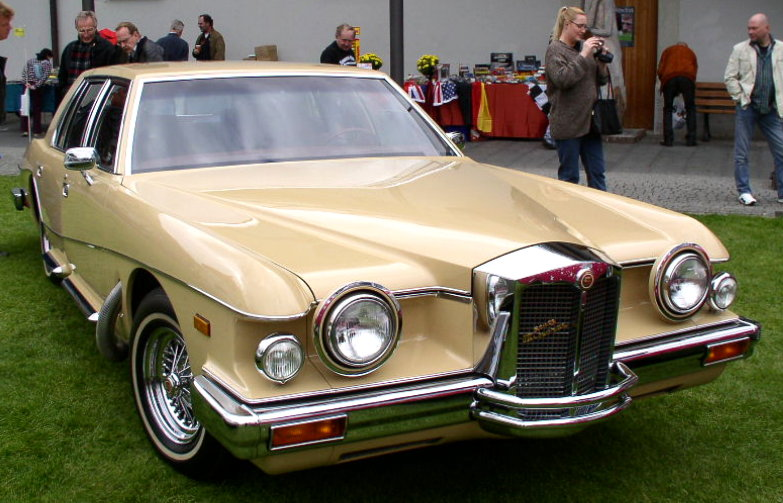
1979 Stutz IV-Porte

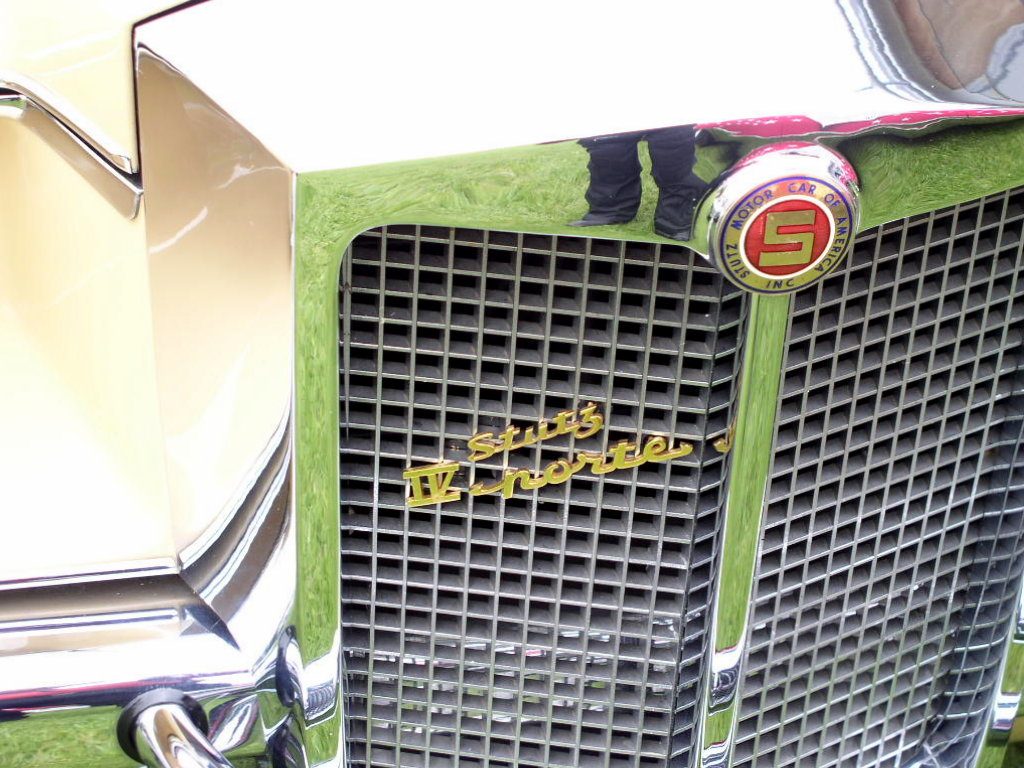
1979 Stutz IV-Porte (grille)

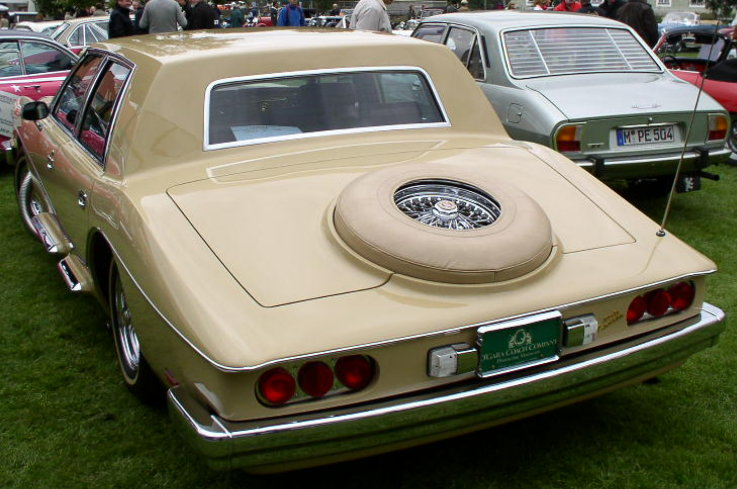
1979 Stutz IV-Porte

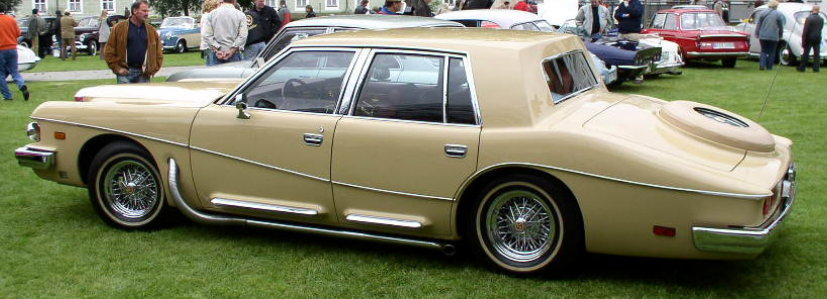
1979 Stutz IV-Porte

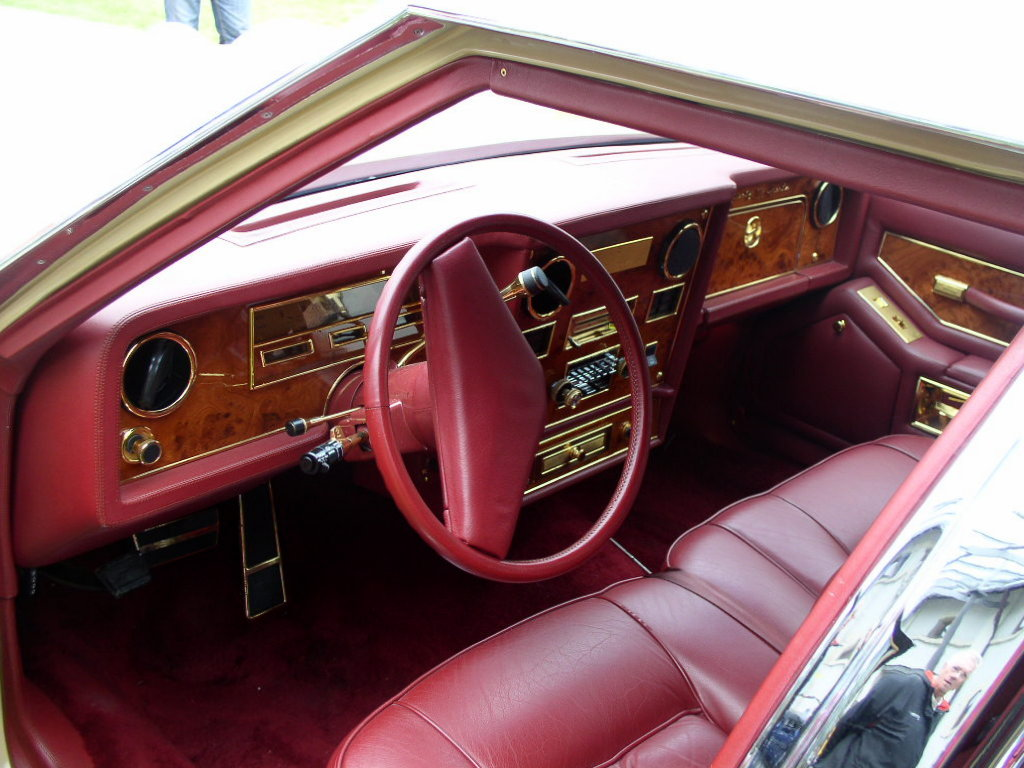
1979 Stutz IV-Porte (interior)

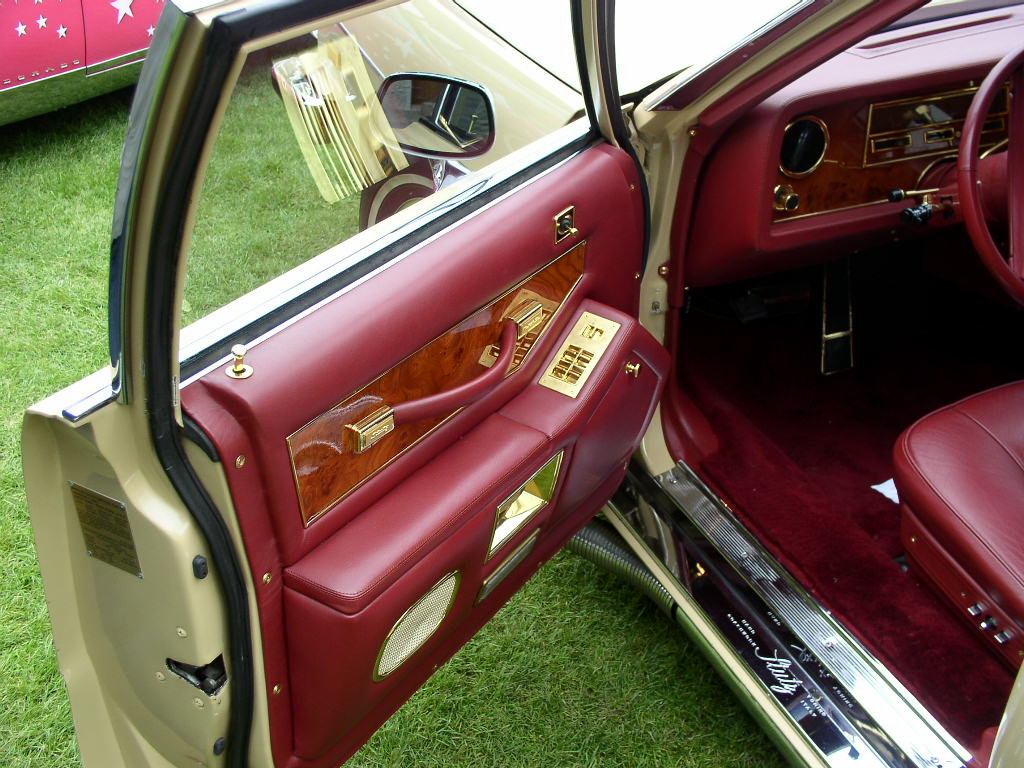
1979 Stutz IV-Porte (gold plated door trim)

The Stutz IV-Porte (also called Duplex and Victoria) were sedans produced by the Stutz Motor Car of America company in the 1970s and 1980s. The Stutz Diplomatica and later Royale were limousines produced by the Stutz Motor Car of America company in the 1970s and 1980s. All these cars shared characteristic design features, such as a spare tire protruding through the trunklid and freestanding headlamps as well as a very luxurious interior, with the Stutz Blackhawk coupe designed by Virgil Exner.

== Stutz Duplex ==
The Duplex was a sedan version of the Blackhawk coupe. A four-door prototype was built in 1970 by Carrozzeria Padane in Modena, Italy. The sedan was offered in 1972 by the name Limousine and in 1973 by the name Duplex for US$32,500 ($244,306 in 2024). The Duplex was discontinued in 1974. Only one or two were built.

== Stutz IV-Porte ==
The IV-Porte was produced from 1979 through 1981 on the GM B platform Pontiac Bonneville/Oldsmobile 88 Royale/Buick LeSabre platform. About 50 cars were built. The 1981 IV-Porte sedan was priced US$84,500 ($292,255 in 2024). Singer Kenny Rogers owned a white 1980 Stutz IV-Porte. In the movie Night Shift Bill "Blaze" Blazejowski (played by Michael Keaton) appears to be driving a 1981 IV-Porte sedan. Barry White owned a 1979 IV-Porte, the car was located by and restored for his widow on the History channel television show Counting Cars.

== Stutz Victoria ==
In 1981 the IV-Porte was discontinued and replaced by the Victoria. This sedan was 10 inches (250 mm) longer, offering more legroom and folding tables in the back, and was positioned as a limousine, complete with Stutz-provided driver service. It kept design features as the protruding spare on the trunklid and the freestanding headlamps but lacked the sidepipes. About 20 cars were built.

Many of these Victorias, all of them white, were sold to the House of Saud, the royal family of Saudi Arabia. But within 2 to 3 years all of them were retired due to various malfunctions.

The 1985 Victoria was priced US$99,500 ($290,896 in 2024). A well maintained 1985 Stutz Victoria (black with red leather interior) was auctioned off at Fort Lauderdale, USA, on March 6, 2011, for US$39,050.

== Stutz Diplomatica ==
The Diplomatica, introduced in 1981 and produced through 1985, was a standard-wheelbase limousine based on the Cadillac DeVille. It had many design-similarities with the larger Stutz Royale. Of the seven Diplomaticas produced, all but one were purchased for use in the Kingdom of Saudi Arabia. The 1981 armored version was priced US$225,000 ($778,194 in 2024).

== Stutz Royale ==
Three extended-wheelbase limousines designed by Paolo Martin were also produced, the latter two using the Royale name in homage to the Bugatti Royale. The first two were purchased by King Fahd of Saudi Arabia, while the third went to Omar Bongo, the President of Gabon.

These 25-foot (7.5 m) state limousines had a throne in the back that could be raised above a sliding roof and rotate 360 degrees. This allowed the occupant to be in full view during a ceremonial parade. The throne could be dropped instantly and the roof closed automatically.

The 1981 armored version of the Royale was in the Stutz pricelist for US$285,000 ($985,712 in 2024). Stutz used armor on their Chevrolet Suburban-based armored SUVs Defender/Gazelle/Bear.
