= AutoClásica =

Vintage Car Show: 1998, Argentina

Autoclasica is a classic and vintage cars show held in San Isidro, Buenos Aires, Argentina. It is organized by the Club de Automóviles Clásicos (CAC) since 1998, and takes place in early October at the Hipódromo de San Isidro gardens.

The event is the largest in South America, with more than 1,000 vehicles on display.

== Best of Show ==
Award year	Vehicle year	Make	Model
1998	1937	Cord	812S
1999	1957	Mercedes-Benz	300 SL
2000	1931	Alfa Romeo	6C 1750 Zagato
2004	1952	Ferrari	212
2005	1938	Bentley	Sedanca de Ville
2006	1923	Vauxhall	Velox
2007	1927	Bentley	3 Litre
2008	1914	Berliet	Berliet
2009	1920	Rolls-Royce	Silver Ghost
2010	1906	Renault	35/40 CV
2011	1935	Bugatti	T57 Bertelli
2012	1929	Stutz	Le Baron Roadster
2013	1926	Rolls-Royce	Phantom I Sedanca de Ville Barker
2014	1936	Avions Voisin	C28 Chancellerie
2015	1955	Mercedes-Benz	300 SL
2016	1964	Ferrari	250 LM
2017	1939	Bugatti	Type 57 Atalante
2018	1953	Ferrari	340/375 MM
2019	1932	Delage	D8
2022	1935	Bugatti	Bugatti Type 57 Ventoux
2023	1906	Ford	Model K Touring
2024	1940	Maserati	8CL
