= Stutz Blackhawk =

American ultra-luxury car

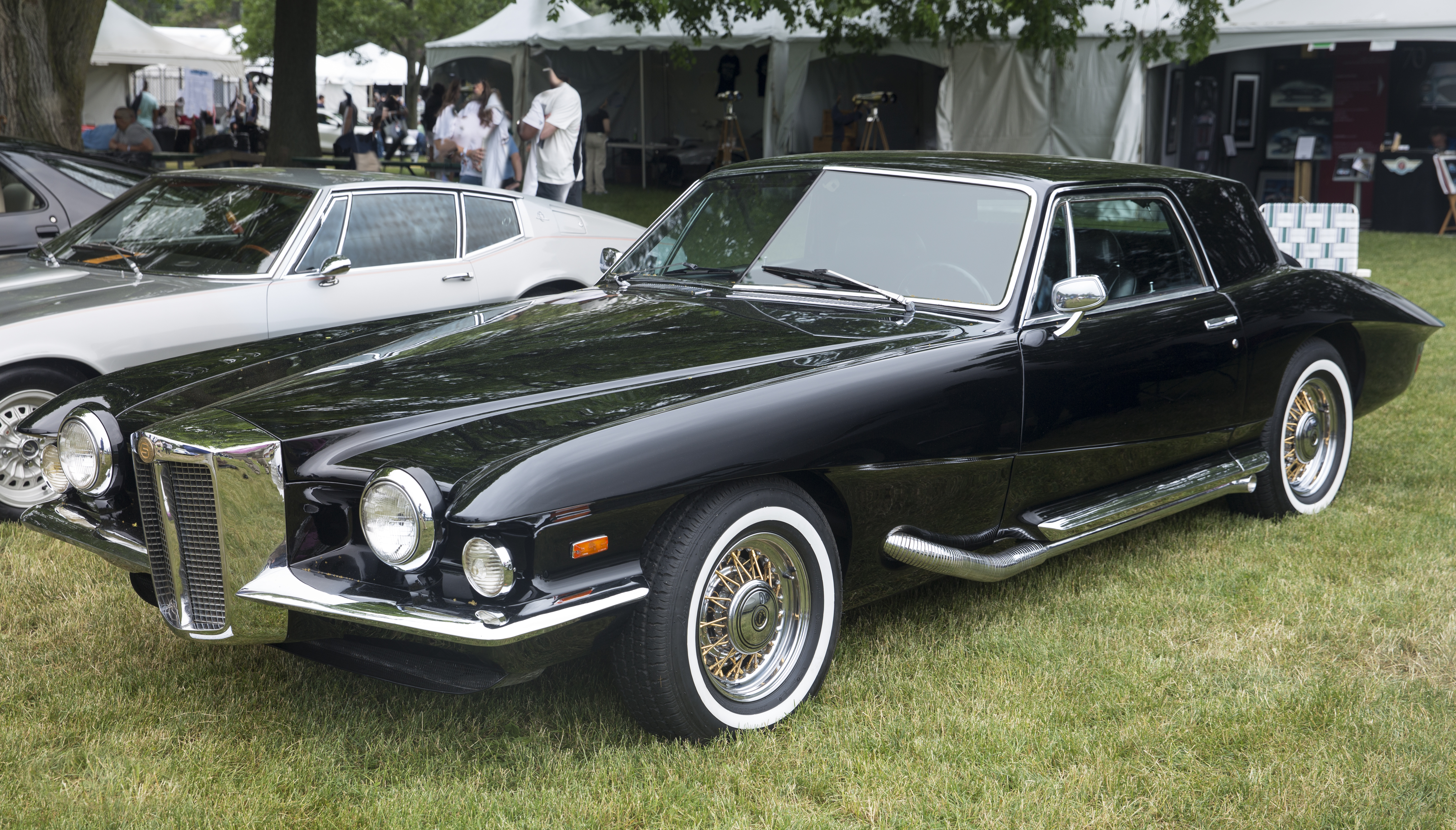
- 1971 Stutz Blackhawk I bought by Elvis Presley, the first Stutz sold

Overview
- Manufacturer: Stutz Motor Company
- Production: 1971–1987
- Designer: Virgil Exner

Body and chassis
- Class: Personal luxury car

Powertrain
- Engine: 302 Windsor; 307 Oldsmobile 5.0L V8; 350 V8; 351 Windsor; T/A 6.6; 6.6. Litre; 425 V8; 429 Cobra Jet; 454 Super Sport; 455; 460 V8; 472 V8; 500 V8

The Stutz Blackhawk is an American luxury car manufactured from 1971 through 1987. Other than the name, it bears no resemblance to the original Blackhawk (1929–1930). Prices ranged from US$22,500 to US$75,000. All early Blackhawks were coupes, but rare sedans were produced later. Convertible versions were called D'Italia and Bearcat. By 1976, Stutz had sold 205 Blackhawks, and about six a month were handbuilt in Italy and shipped to the U.S. By April 1980, 350 Blackhawks had been sold, and by the time production ended in 1987, approximately 500 to 600 cars had been manufactured.

== History ==
The Stutz Motor Company was revived in August 1968 by New York banker James O'Donnell. He joined forces with retired Chrysler stylist Virgil Exner who designed the new Blackhawk. Exner's design included a spare tire that protruded through the decklid, a faux radiator shell-type chrome grille and freestanding headlamps. The new Blackhawk was prototyped by Ghia in Italy at a cost of over US$300,000. To offer exclusivity and still permit easy servicing in the U.S. a General Motors platform and engine served as the base for the custom built Italian body. The Blackhawk debuted in January 1970 at the Waldorf Astoria in New York City. Series production began in 1970; the original design (Series I) has a split windshield and was handmade at Officine Padane in Modena, Italy. From 1972, with the Series II, production commenced at Carrozzeria Saturn in Cavallermaggiore, near Turin, Italy. In 1973 the Series III was introduced; this version was kept in production until 1979. New series numbers were issued almost every year, ending with the Blackhawk VII, but there are no serious distinctions until the new, smaller Blackhawk VIII appeared for 1980. Mechanical changes mirroring those of the Pontiac Grand Prix took place, and the taillights were changed on occasion. For 1978 Pontiac chose to downsize the Grand Prix, but Stutz did not want to follow the same route and did not have a new design at the ready. Instead, they stocked up on a large number of 1977 Grand Prix and kept building the car for an additional two years.

In 1980, the Blackhawk VIII was presented. The basic design was reworked to suit the Pontiac Bonneville chassis (later on the Parisienne), which had a near-identical wheelbase to that of the earlier Grand Prix. In 1985, Stutz changed to using the Oldsmobile Delta 88/Buick LeSabre chassis - versions of the same General Motors B platform which had been used earlier, but no longer offered by Pontiac.

== Design and manufacturing ==
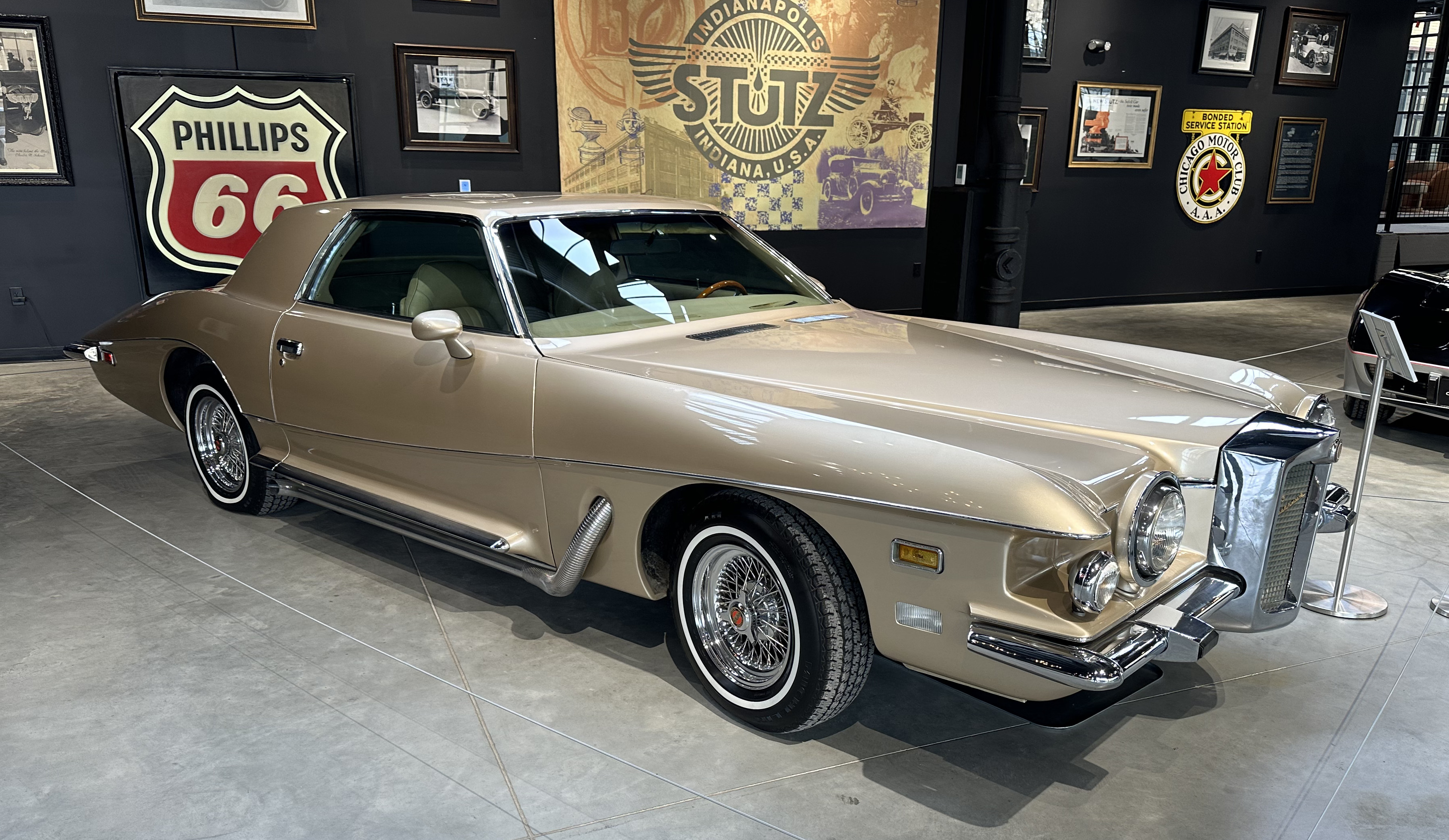
A 1973 Stutz Blackhawk on display at the Stutz Car Museum in Indianapolis

With an extra heavy gauge steel body, the Blackhawk measures greater than 19 feet (5.8 meters) long. Production Blackhawks used Pontiac Grand Prix running gear, Pontiac's 7.5 L (455 in^{3}) V8 engine, a GM TH400 three-speed automatic transmission, and rear-wheel drive. With its engine tuned to produce 425 hp (317 kW) and 420 lb⋅ft (569 N⋅m), the 5,000 pounds (2,300 kg) Blackhawk can accelerate to 60 mph (97 km/h) in 8.4 seconds with a 130 mph (209 km/h) top speed, delivering eight miles per gallon (30 L/100 km).

Later Blackhawks use Pontiac's 403 and 350 V8 engines. Also Ford, Chevrolet and Cadillac engines were used. The handbuilt Blackhawk received 18 to 22 hand-rubbed lacquer paint coats that took six weeks to apply. Total production time for each vehicle was over 1500 man-hours.

=== Special features ===
Exner's design included a spare tire that protruded through the trunk lid and freestanding headlamps. The fuel filler cap is positioned inside the spare tire on the first models. The interior includes 24-carat gold plated trim and bird's eye maple or burled walnut and redwood, Connolly leather seats and dash, instrument markings in both English and Italian, fine wool or mink carpeting and headlining, a cigar lighter, and a liquor cabinet in the back. There is a clock in the steering wheel hub on some later models. Other special features include automatic headlamp controls with twilight sensor, cornering lamps, bilevel automatic air conditioning, Superlift air adjustable shock absorbers, Safe-T-Track limited slip differential, an electric sunroof, cruise control, central locking, a burglar alarm, non-functional exhaust side pipes, and a high-end Lear Jet AM/FM eight-track quadraphonic sound system. The first models rolled on special 17-inch Firestone LXX run-flat tires and rims. These were taken off the market however as they turned out to be unsafe.

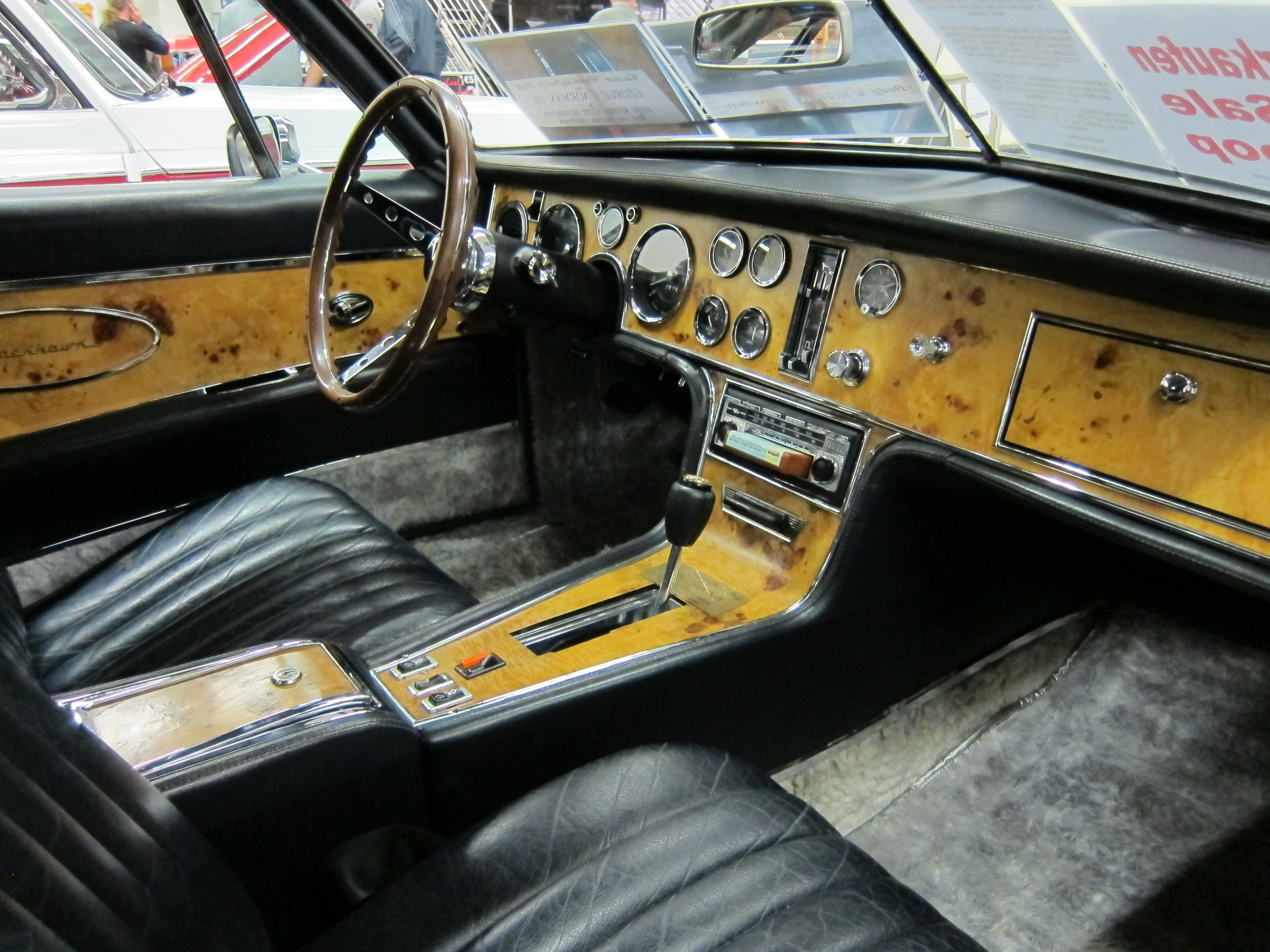
Series I Blackhawk interior

== Price and value ==
The 1971 Blackhawk's factory price was $22,500. (Note: equivalent to $178,872 in 2025) In 1974 the factory price had increased to $35,000. (Note: equivalent to $228,492 in 2025) A year later, in 1975, the factory price was US$41,500. (Note: equivalent to $248,307 in 2025) In 1976 a Blackhawk's base price was $47,500. (Note: equivalent to $268,750 in 2025) And in 1981 the coupe sold for $84,500. (Note: equivalent to $299,245 in 2025) The Stutz d’Italia was advertised as "the most expensive car sold today" at $129,500 at the same time as the Bearcat VI was offered for under half this at "only $64,165". Mint condition early generations (1971–1975) had an estimated value in 2002 of $32,000 to $35,000. After his death Wilson Pickett's well preserved 1974 Stutz Blackhawk was auctioned off in 2007 for US$50,600. (Note: equivalent to $78,568 in 2025)

== Notable Blackhawk owners ==
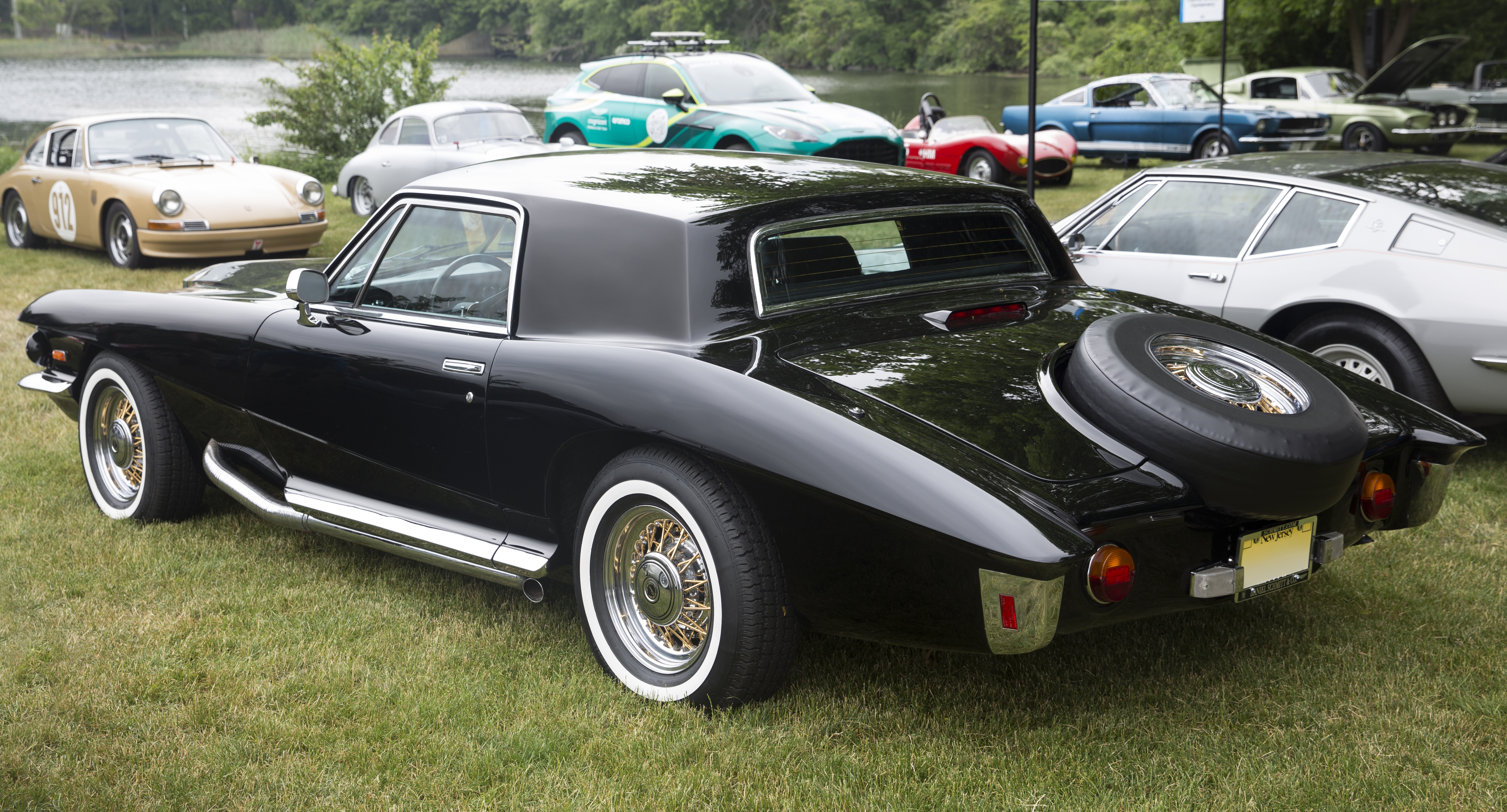
Rear view of Elvis Presley's 1971 Stutz Blackhawk I

The very first Blackhawk sold was purchased by Elvis Presley on October 9, 1970, for $26,500. (Note: equivalent to $219,698 in 2025) This was the second Blackhawk prototype, as built by Officine Padane (the first one, built by Ghia, was driven by James O'Donnell himself). Frank Sinatra had vied with Presley for the car. Sinatra was offered the second prototype on the condition that the distributor, Jules Meyers, could show the car at the LA Auto Show, and get publicity photos with Sinatra upon delivery. Sinatra declined, but Presley accepted and ended up with the car. Presley had it customized by George Barris after purchase. In January 1971, Presley had a mobile telephone installed for $1,467.50. (Note: equivalent to $11,738 in 2025) In July 1971, a hired driver destroyed the car. Distributor Jules Meyers offered $1,000 (Note: equivalent to $7,950 in 2025) for the wreck, but Presley declined and put the wrecked car in storage. It was only restored, with non-original parts, after his death and can now be seen at the Graceland museum. Presley bought at least three more Blackhawks and leased one other (he bought a black 1971 for himself and a white 1971 for his Las Vegas doctor, Elias Ghanem, and leased a white 1972 and a black 1973, his favorite Blackhawk, which he purchased at the end of the lease; this 1973 car is also on display at Graceland).

Other famous owners included Dick Martin (1971), Lucille Ball (who got her 1971 Blackhawk as a gift from her husband Gary Morton with a dash plaque saying I Love Lucy - Gary), Sammy Davis Jr. (who owned two 1972, one for himself and one for his wife), Dean Martin (who owned three and crashed his 1972 Blackhawk with vanity plate DRUNKY), Robert Goulet (1972), Evel Knievel (1974), Wilson Pickett (1974), Luigi Colani (1974), Lou Brock (1974), Johnnie Taylor (1975), Johnny Cash (1975), Curd Jürgens and Willie Mays (1977), Erik Estrada (1978), Larry Holmes (1982), as well as Jerry Lewis, Charley Pride, Liberace, Willie Nelson, Isaac Hayes, Muhammad Ali, George Foreman, Tom Jones, Billy Joel, Elton John, Paul McCartney, Al Pacino, Wayne Newton, Barry White, and H.B. Halicki. The Shah of Iran reportedly owned twelve of them. Stutz collector Ken Ramsey owns at least ten Blackhawks.

Each car included a dash plaque naming its original owner.

=== Fictional owners ===
- Nikki Sixx (played by Douglas Booth) in the 2019 Mötley Crüe biopic Netflix film The Dirt, drives a black 1974 Stutz Blackhawk.
- Bill "Blaze" Blazejowski (played by Michael Keaton) in the movie Night Shift appears not to drive a Blackhawk but a 1981 Stutz IV-Porte sedan.
- In the movie 8mm, James Gandolfini's character Eddie Poole has a black Stutz Blackhawk.
- In the movie Never Die Alone, DMX's character King David owns a Stutz Blackhawk, which is then inherited by David Arquette's character Paul Paskoff.
- In an episode of Dragon Ball GT features the appearance of an escape vehicle with a remarkable likeness to the Stutz Blackhawk.
- In an episode of Columbo, ('Forgotten Lady', episode), John Payne's character Ned Diamond drives a white Stutz Blackhawk.
- In another episode of Columbo, ('Murder Under Glass', 1978), Louis Jourdan's character, Paul Gerard, drives a two-tone black and grey Stutz Blackhawk.
- In the original Gone in 60 Seconds, a 1973 Stutz Blackhawk (codenamed 'Karen') was one of the 48 vehicles stolen to fulfill Maindrian Pace's contract.

== See also ==
- Clénet Coachworks
- Cumberford Martinique
- Desande
- Excalibur (automobile)
- Zimmer (automobile)
