= Officine Padane =

- Industry: Automotive
- Founded: 1943
- Defunct: 1992
- Fate: Bankruptcy
- Headquarters: Modena, Italy

Officine Padane was an Italian manufacturer of vehicle bodies in Modena.

== History ==
Officine Padane was founded in 1943. The company traces its origins to the Modena-based Orlandi company, which from 1921 onwards primarily manufactured bodies for buses. Antonio Vismara took over Orlandi in the course of 1943 and moved the company to new workshops. Initially the company was called Carrozzeria e Meccanica Padana, but from 1950 the name was changed to Officine Padane. The relationship refers to the Italian name of the Po Valley.

Like its predecessor, Padane mainly manufactured bus bodies. The chassis came from Fiat, Daimler-Benz, Lancia, OM and Volvo. Many buses were exported.

In the 1960s and 1970s, Padane also took on small batch production of passenger cars. These included the Maserati Mistral, the Maserati Indy, and the Maserati Bora, as well as the Stutz Blackhawk I and the Stutz Duplex, which were distributed by Stutz Motor Car Company. Padane built most of the coupés of the first series (1971) using numerous Italian add-on parts (door handles from the Maserati Indy, taillights from the Fiat 850), before Carrozzeria Saturn in Cavallermaggiore took over series production of the Stutz.

In the early 1980s, the Milan-based Società Costruzioni Industriali Milano (Socimi) took over the company. Due to economic difficulties of the new parent company, Padane also suffered and had to close in 1992 after bankruptcy.

== Revival ==
In 2015, the newly founded company Industria Italiana Autobus SpA (IIA) from Bologna bought the naming rights to Padane.

== Gallery ==
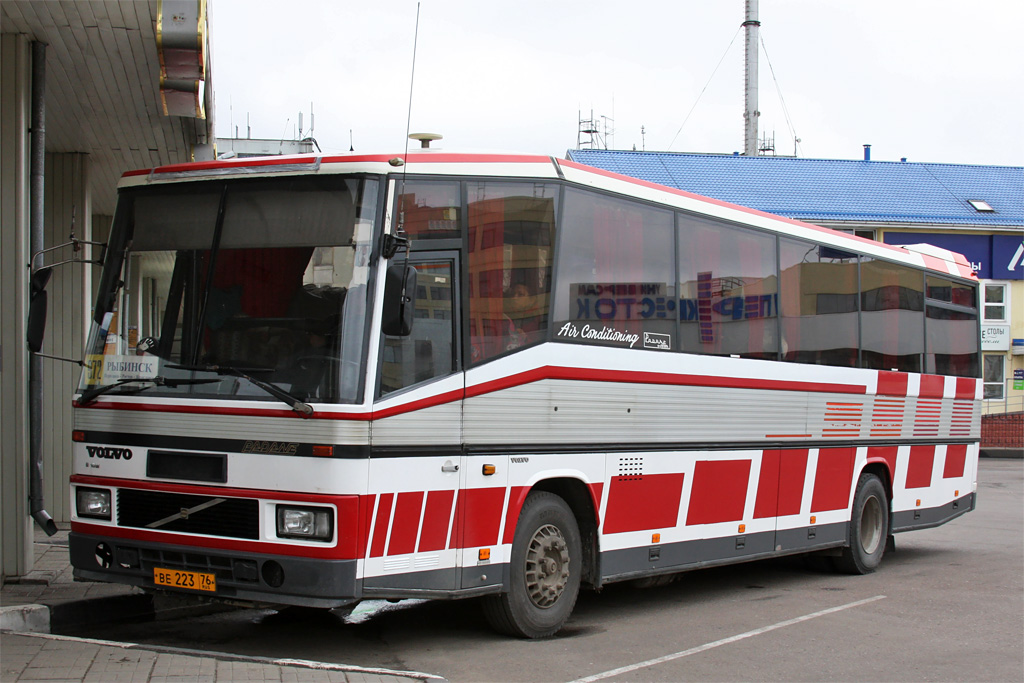
Padane coach on Volvo chassis

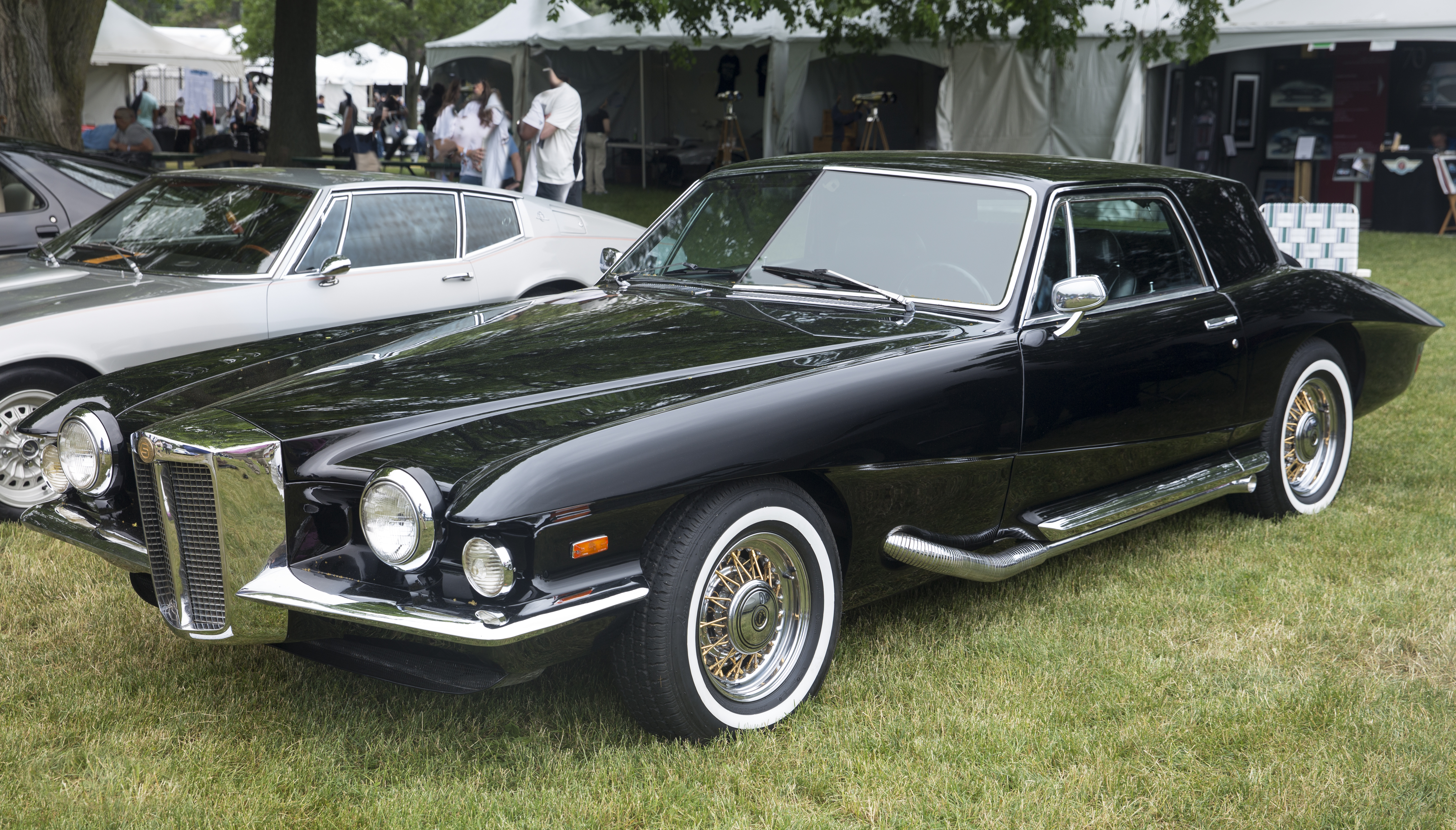
Stutz Blackhawk

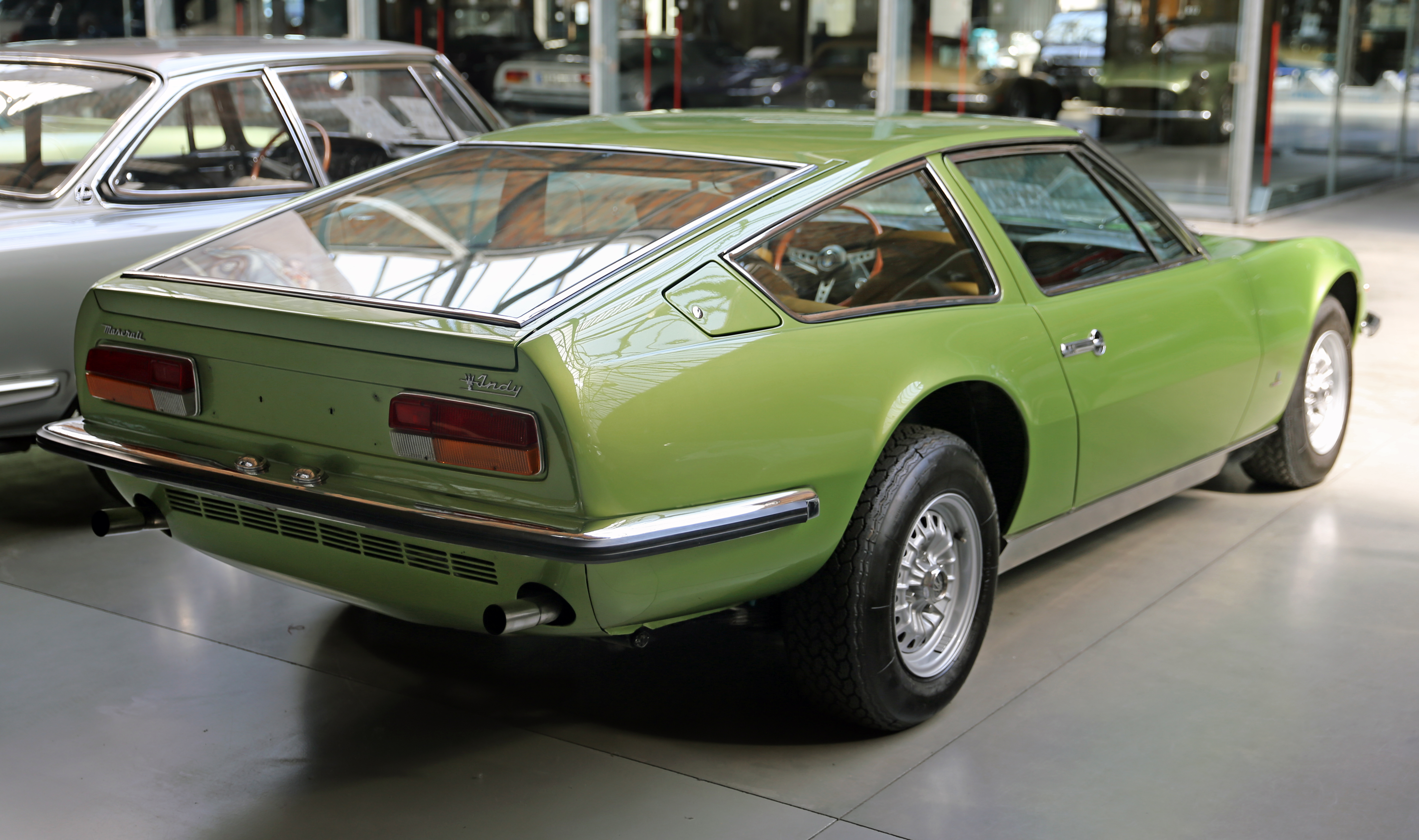
Maserati Indy

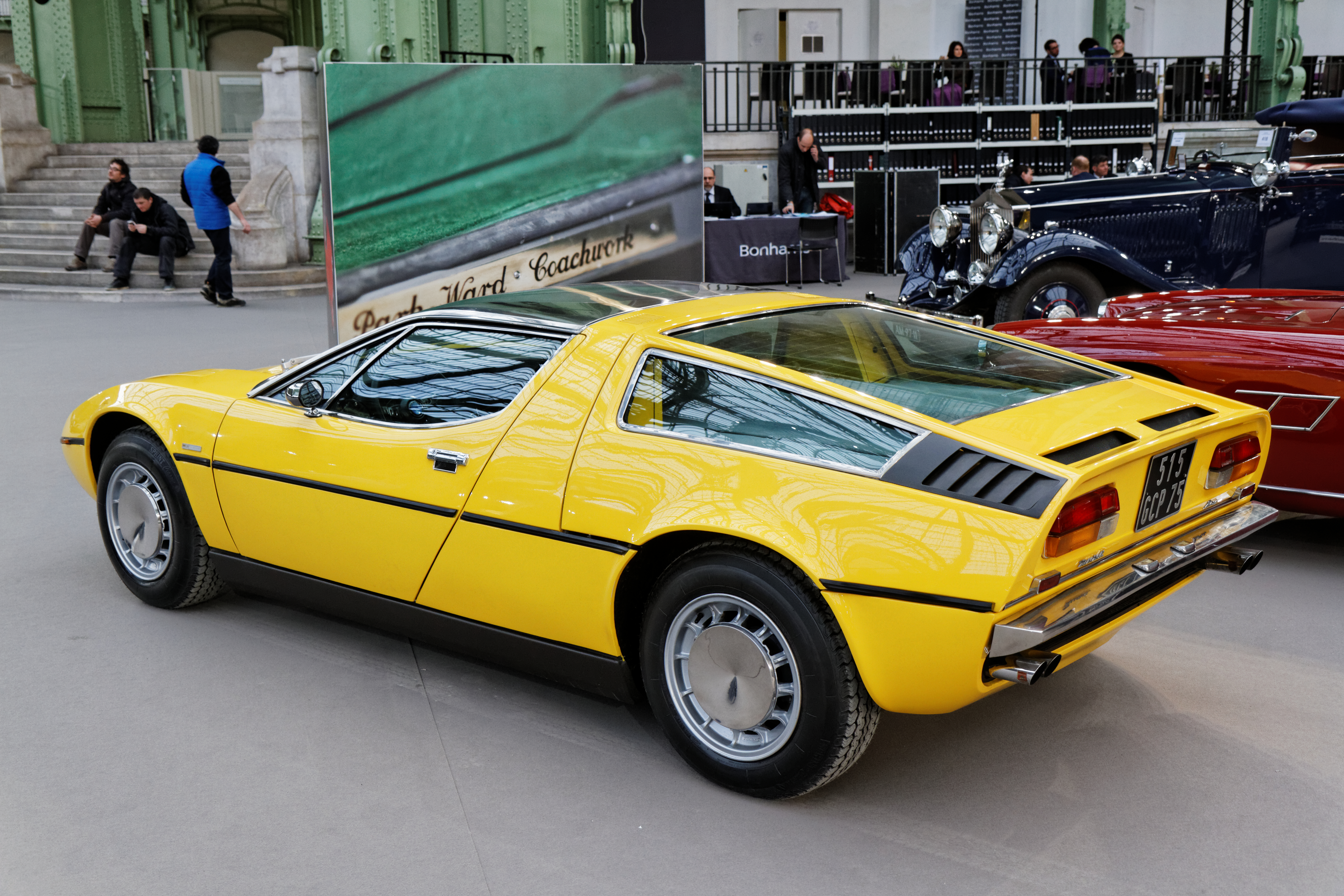
Maserati Bora

== Literature ==
- Hartmut Lehbrink: Gericke's 100 - 100 Jahre Sportwagen, Gericke Holding GmbH, Düsseldorf 2002, ISBN 978-3-938118-00-9
- Gianni Cancellieri et al. (Hrsg.): Maserati. Catalogue Raisonné 1926-2003. Automobilia, Mailand 2003, ISBN 978-88-7960-151-1
- Maurizio Tabucchi: Maserati. Alle Grand Prix-, Sport- und GT-Fahrzeuge von 1926 bis heute. Heel-Verlag, Königswinter 2004, ISBN 978-3-89880-211-6
- Hans-Karl Lange: Maserati. Der andere italienische Sportwagen. Wien 1993, ISBN 978-3-552-05102-7
- James O'Donnell: The Story of Stutz. Rebirth of a classic car. Abriss der Geschichte des Unternehmens Stutz Motor Car of America von James O'Donnell aus dem Jahr 1991 (abzurufen auf www.madle.org)
- Alessandro Sannia: Enciclopedia dei carrozzieri italiani, Società Editrice Il Cammello, 2017, ISBN 978-88-96796-41-2
