= Stutz Vertical Eight =

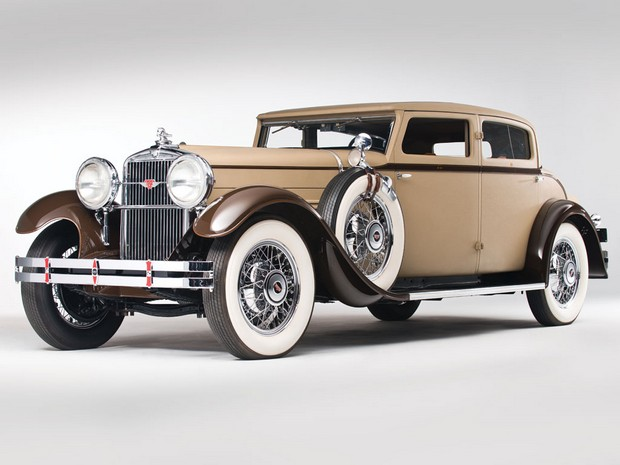
- 1930 Stutz SV-16 Monte Carlo by Weymann

Overview
- Manufacturer: Stutz Motor Car Company
- Production: 1926–1935
- Assembly: Indianapolis, Indiana, United States

The Stutz Vertical Eight (also known as the Stutz Model 8, or Stutz 8-Cylinder) was a series of luxury automobiles produced by the Stutz Motor Car Company of Indianapolis, Indiana, from 1926 until the mid 1930s. Introduced as the company's first inline eight powered model, the Vertical Eight represented a major technological leap for Stutz, featuring an advanced single overhead camshaft (SOHC) engine and the pioneering "Safety Stutz" chassis. It earned a reputation as one of the fastest American production cars of the late 1920s, with certain Black Hawk Speedster variants capable of exceeding 100 mph (161 km/h).

The car was offered in a wide variety of body styles, ranging from formal sedans and broughams to sporty speedsters and roadsters, many of which were coachbuilt by firms such as Brewster, LeBaron, Rollston, Waterhouse, Weymann and others. Production overlapped several series designations (AA, BB, M, MA, MB) with incremental updates before the Great Depression forced changes to the lineup.

== History ==
Following the departure of founder Harry C. Stutz in 1919, the company struggled until Frederick Moskovics took charge in the mid-1920s. Moskovics sought to reposition Stutz as a high performance luxury marque. Engineer Charles Greuter designed the new straight eight engine, which debuted in 1926 as the Vertical Eight. The model was paired with the innovative Safety Stutz chassis, which featured a lower center of gravity, semi elliptic leaf springs, and four wheel Lockheed hydraulic brakes with a vacuum booster advanced safety features for the era.

The Vertical Eight quickly gained acclaim. Factory tests and period advertising claimed top speeds over 100 mph for the lighter sporting models, making it faster than most contemporary American luxury cars. Sales reached approximately 5,000 units in the first full year, boosted by the car's modern engineering and stylish appearance.

== Vertical Eight series ==
Stutz AA/BB/M/MA and MB
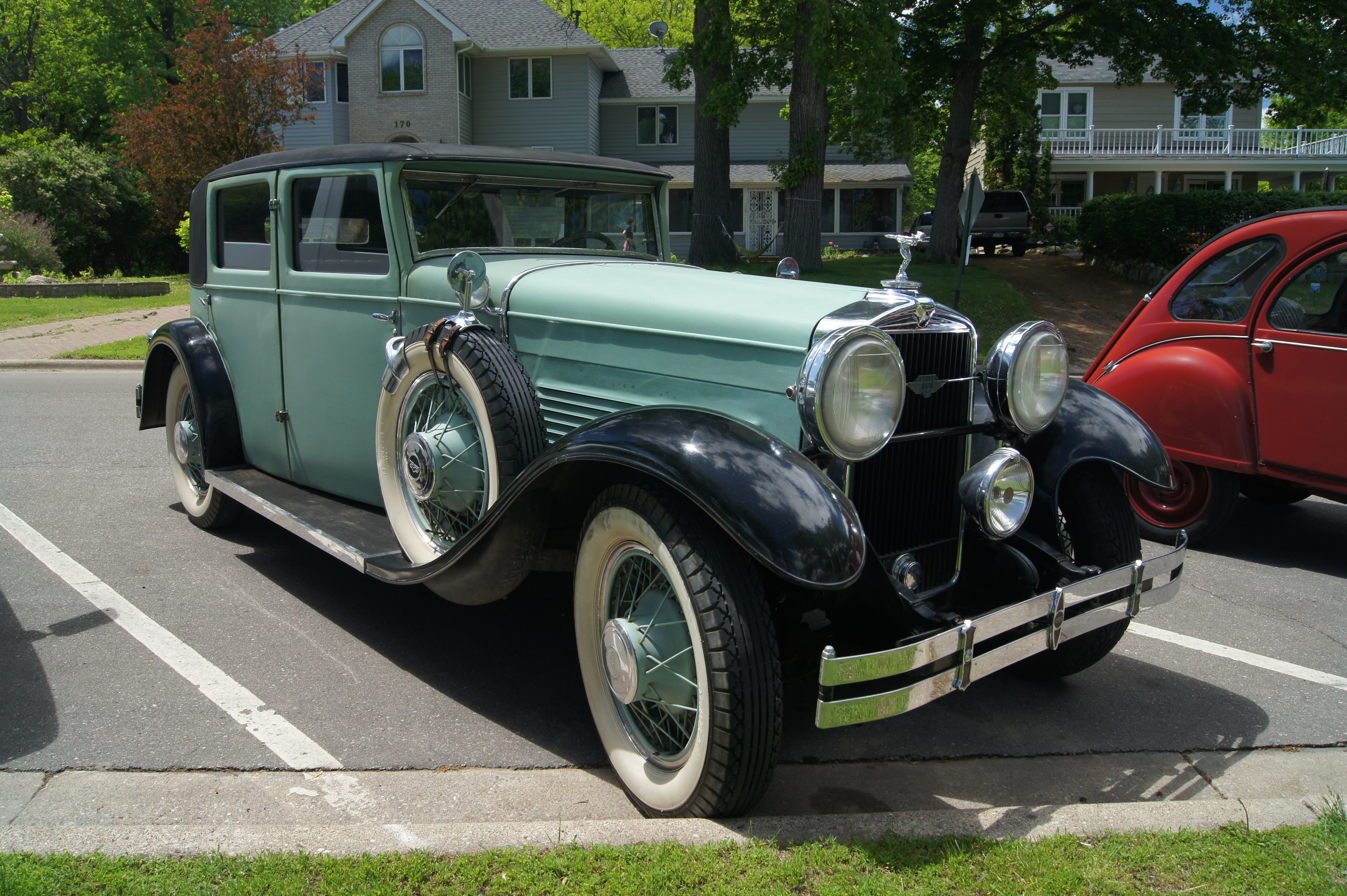
- 1930 Stutz Model MA

Overview
- Manufacturer: Stutz Motor Car Company
- Production: 1926–1929
- Assembly: Indianapolis, Indiana, United States

Body and chassis
- Class: Ultra-luxury car
- Body style: Coachbuilt to owner's preference
- Layout: Front mid-engine, rear-wheel-drive

Powertrain
- Engine: 5.3 L (322 cu in) SOHC Stutz straight-8 + optional supercharger
- Transmission: 4-speed manual

Dimensions
- Wheelbase: 3,327 mm (131 in); 3,683 mm (145 in)

The core offering was the Vertical Eight, an inline-eight powered luxury car available in numerous coachbuilt body styles by firms such as Brewster, LeBaron, Rollston, Waterhouse, and Weymann. Early series used designations such as AA, BB, M, MA, and MB, with incremental updates to engines, chassis, and styling.

=== AA and BB series (1926–1928) ===
- Introduced as the 1926 "Safety Stutz," the AA featured a 4.7-liter (287–298 cu in) SOHC inline-eight producing about 92 hp (later up to 115 hp), with dual ignition and a nine-bearing crankshaft. Wheelbases varied (typically 130–145 inches). Bodies included sedans, touring cars, coupes, and the rakish Black Hawk Speedster (a spiritual successor to the Bearcat, with boat-tail styling, side-mounted spare tires, and performance-oriented features). The BB series continued with refinements; lighter sporting models exceeded 100 mph. A steel-bodied AA sedan set endurance records at Indianapolis.

=== M series and variants (1929) ===
- The Model M represented the senior line with further engine enhancements (including supercharged options for racing). Custom bodies featured luxurious interiors with exotic veneers. A shorter-wheelbase Model L variant fed into the companion Blackhawk line.

== SV-16 and DV-32 ==
Stutz SV-16/DV-32
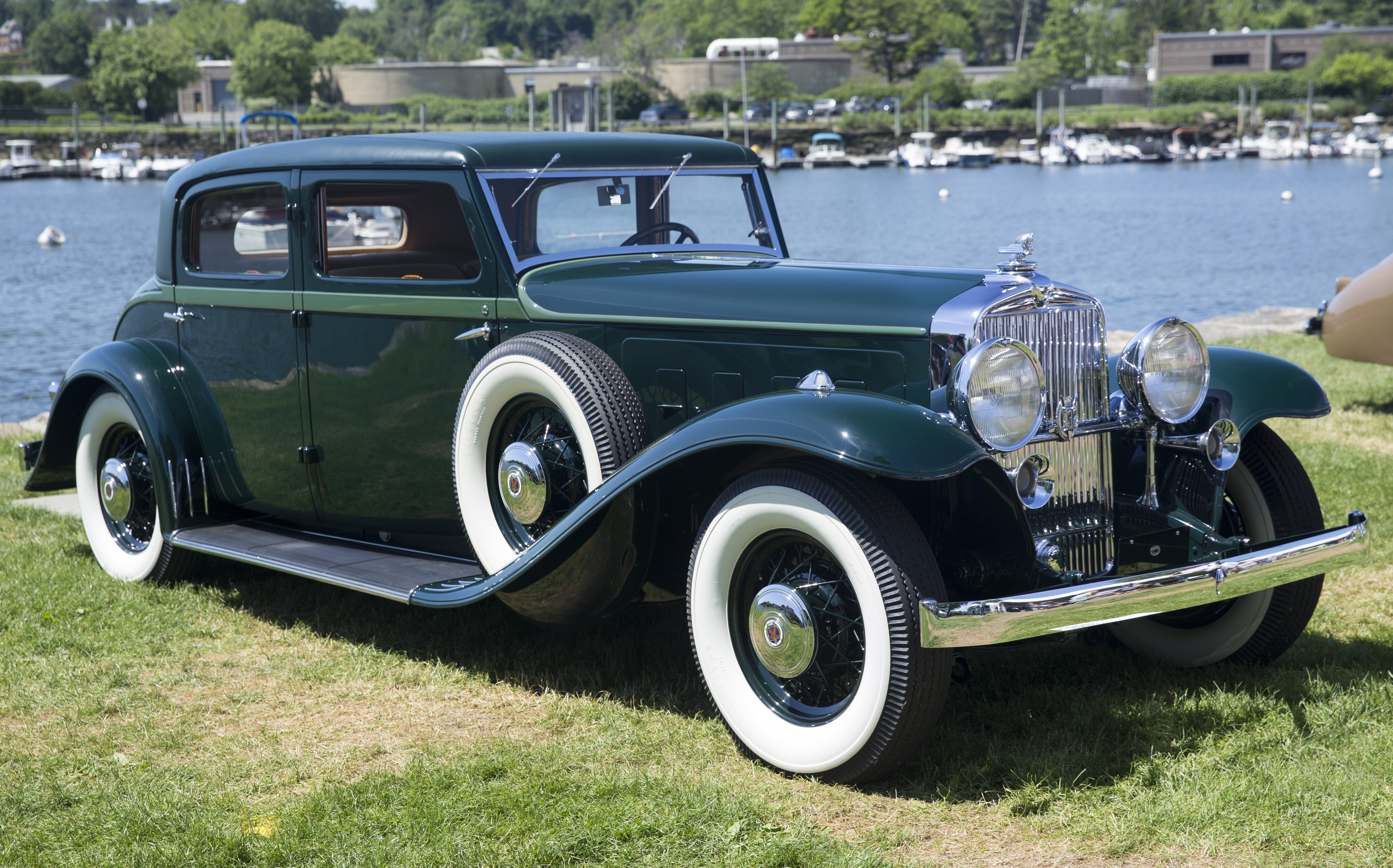
- 1933 Stutz DV-32 Monte Carlo

Overview
- Manufacturer: Stutz Motor Car Company
- Production: 1930–1935
- Assembly: Indianapolis, Indiana, United States

Body and chassis
- Class: Ultra-luxury car
- Body style: Coachbuilt to owner's preference
- Layout: Front mid-engine, rear-wheel-drive

Powertrain
- Engine: 5.3 L (322 cu in) SOHC Stutz straight-8 5.3 L (322 cu in) DOHC Stutz straight-8 + optional supercharger
- Transmission: 4-speed manual

Dimensions
- Wheelbase: 3,429 mm (135 in); 3,683 mm (145 in)

The Stutz SV-16 and DV-32 represented the final evolution of the Stutz Vertical Eight (also known as the Stutz 8) luxury platform in the early 1930s. They shared the innovative "Safety Stutz" chassis characterized by a low center of gravity (thanks to a worm-drive rear axle), hydraulic brakes, safety glass, and excellent handling but differed primarily in their engines. These models catered to affluent buyers seeking performance, safety, and customization during the Great Depression, when Stutz production volumes plummeted.

=== SV-16 (1930–1935) ===
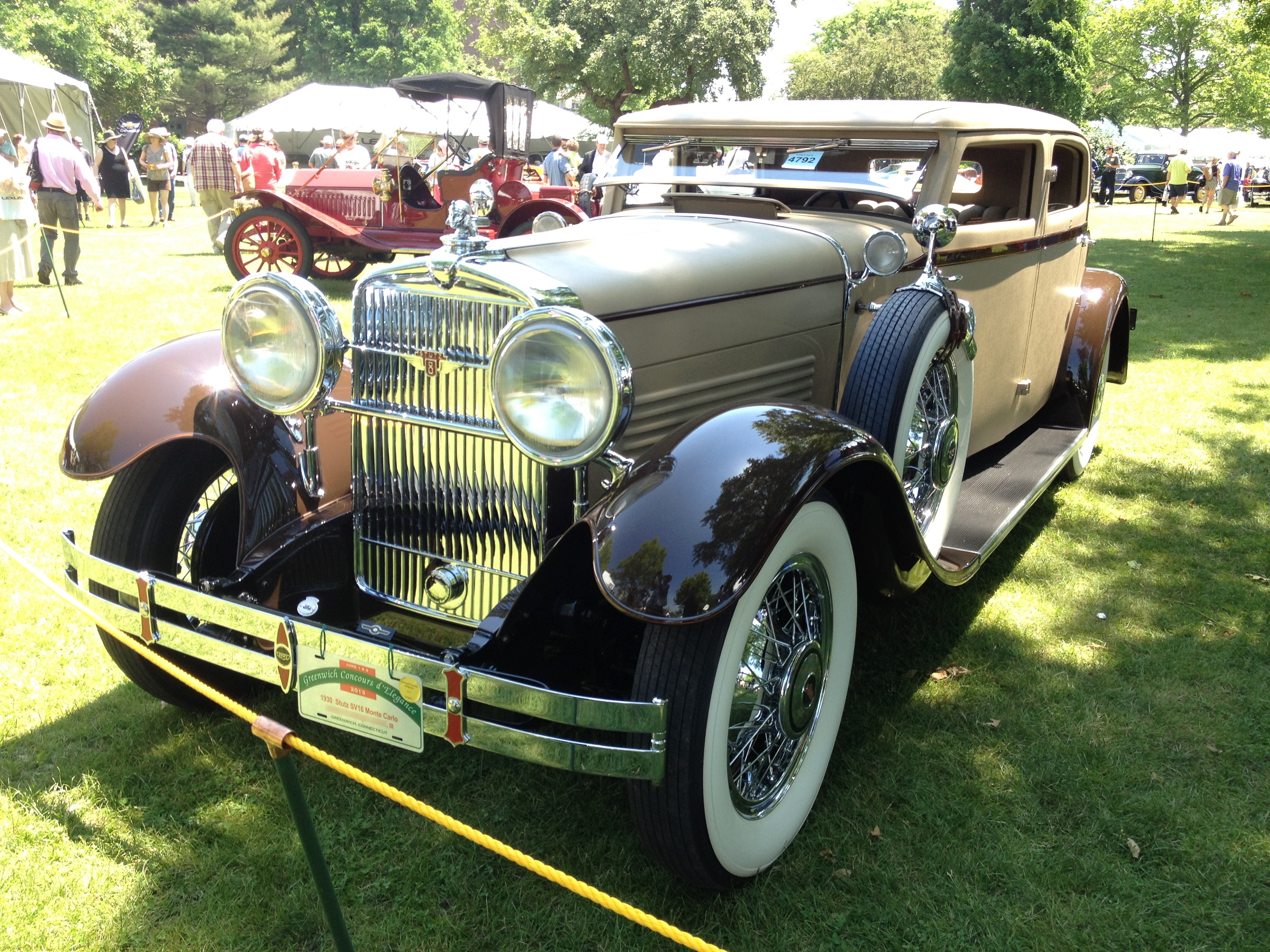
A 1930 Stutz SV16 Monte Carlo

- Essentially the continued Vertical Eight platform with a single-overhead-cam, 16-valve inline-eight (two valves per cylinder). Displacements reached 5.28 liters (322 cu in) in later iterations, with power around 115–130 hp. It shared the Safety chassis and offered bodies such as the Monte Carlo sedan by Weymann and convertible coupes. Pricing ranged from about $2,700 to over $7,500 for custom coachwork.

=== DV-32 (1931–1935) ===
- Stutz's technological flagship, the "Dual Valve-32" featured a DOHC inline-eight with four valves per cylinder (32 total), producing 156–161 hp from 322 cu in at 3,900 rpm—exceptional specific output for the era. Optional higher compression yielded even more power. Top speeds exceeded 100 mph (roadster versions reached 106 mph). It was offered on multiple wheelbases (including a short 116-inch for sporting models) with luxury bodies by LeBaron, Rollston, and others. Fewer than 300 DV-32 cars were built in total.

== Technical specifications ==
- Engines: SOHC 16-valve inline-8 (SV-16 era): ~4.7–5.3 L, 92–130+ hp. DOHC 32-valve inline-8 (DV-32): 5.28 L (322 cu in), 156–161 hp.
- Chassis: "Safety Stutz" underslung frame; low CG; hydraulic four-wheel brakes; three-speed manual transmission (with optional "Noback" hill-holder).
- Performance: 0–60 mph in competitive times for the era; top speeds 90–106+ mph depending on body and tune.
- Bodies: Coachbuilt; open (roadsters, speedsters, phaetons) and closed (sedans, coupes, broughams, limousines) on wheelbases 116–145 inches.

== Racing history ==
Stutz models excelled in stock-car racing and endurance events. Black Hawk Speedsters won the 1927–1928 AAA Stock Car Championship. A 1928 Black Hawk finished second at Le Mans (best American result until 1966). In 1929, supercharged Stutzes placed fifth at Le Mans. A 1930 Stutz set a U.S. production-car speed record of 106.53 mph at Daytona. The company claimed every entered car finished in certain championship seasons.

== Fate ==
Like many independent luxury manufacturers, Stutz was severely impacted by the Great Depression. Production of the Vertical Eight series declined sharply after 1930, and the company introduced more advanced (and expensive) models such as the SV-16 and DV32 to compete with Cadillac, Packard, and others. Automobile production ceased entirely in 1935. The Stutz name was revived in the late 1960s as a neoclassical marque producing modern reinterpretations, but these later cars bore no mechanical relation to the original Vertical Eight.

Surviving examples of the 1926–1935 Stutz Eight are preserved by collectors and sometimes appear at concours d'elegance events, where some have won awards. They are recognised for their engineering, performance capabilities, and coachbuilt bodies, reflecting trends in American luxury performance in the pre-Depression era.
