= Stutz Defender =

The Stutz Defender (later called the Gazelle and Bear) was an SUV based on the Chevrolet Suburban produced by the Stutz Motor Car of America company in the 1980s. It was positioned as an upscale armored vehicle and was popular with heads of state in the Middle East.

== Stutz Defender/Gazelle ==
The Defender (later the Gazelle) was an armored Suburban. It included a roof-mounted machine gun under a sliding hatch.

== Stutz Bear ==
46 Defenders were changed into full convertible sedans, with a rollbar and trunk. These were used by the Saudi Arabian National Guard and by King Hassan of Morocco.
