= Blackhawk (automobile) =

Defunct American motor vehicle manufacturer

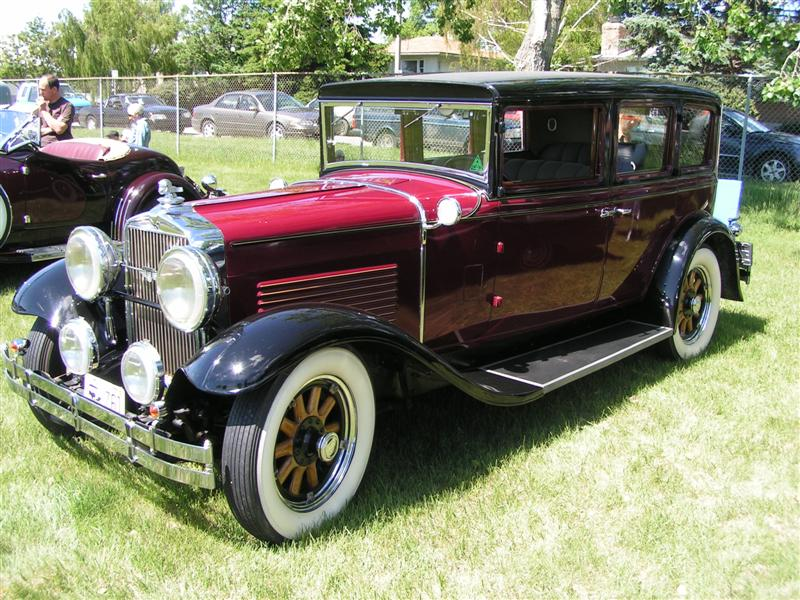
- A Blackhawk seen at the Ramsey community car show.

Overview
- Manufacturer: Stutz Motor Car Company
- Production: 1929–1930
- Assembly: Indianapolis, Indiana, United States

Powertrain
- Engine: 4 L (241.41 cu in) OHC 6; I8

Dimensions
- Wheelbase: 3,238 mm (127.5 in)

The Blackhawk was an automobile manufactured by the Stutz Motor Car Company in Indianapolis from 1929 to 1930.

The Blackhawk was not as powerful, nor as expensive, as contemporary Stutzes, which is most likely why it was marketed as a separate make. The year previously, there was a Stutz model called the Black Hawk, doubtlessly leading to confusion for more than one customer. The car was available with either an overhead cam six-cylinder or straight eight engine, with maximum output of 85 bhp and 95 bhp, respectively. A wide variety of open and closed body styles were available on the 127.5" wheelbase chassis. Custom coachwork was also available. Prices for non-custom Blackhawks ranged from $1995 to $2785. There was a great deal of promotion for the marque, and first year sales were decent at 1310, but second year sales dropped to only 280. The brand was discontinued by years end, another early victim of the Great Depression.
