= Stutz Motor Car Company =

Defunct American motor vehicle manufacturer

Stutz Motor Car Company of America
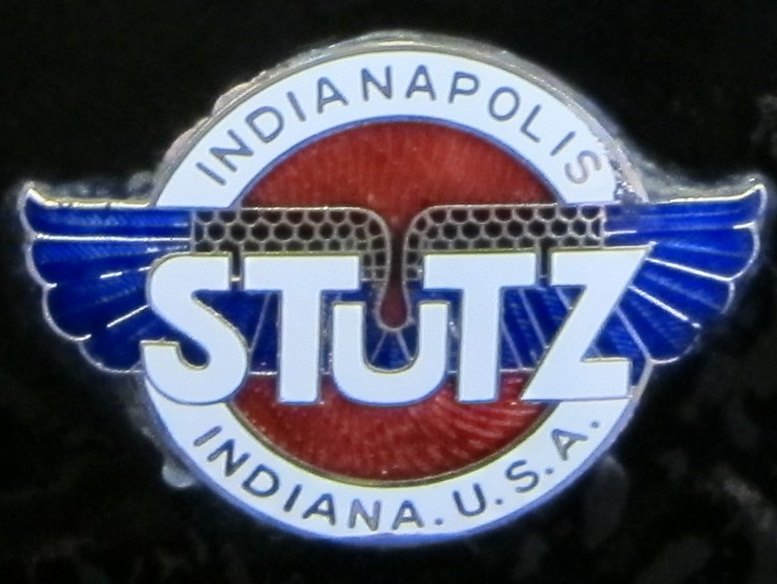
- Type: Public company
- Industry: Automotive
- Founded: Indianapolis, Indiana, United States (1911)
- Founder: Harry Clayton Stutz; Henry F. Campbell
- Defunct: 1939; 87 years ago
- Headquarters: Indianapolis, Indiana, United States
- Area served: Worldwide
- Key people: Harry Clayton Stutz; Henry F. Campbell; Allan A Ryan
- Products: Sports cars, Luxury cars

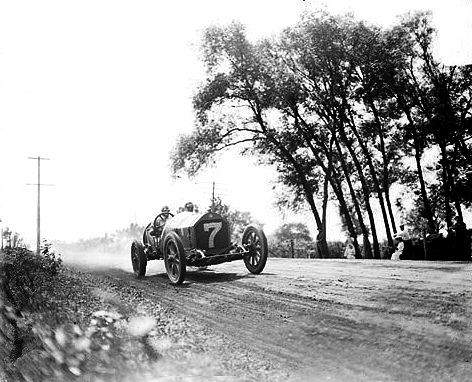
1912 Stutz racer

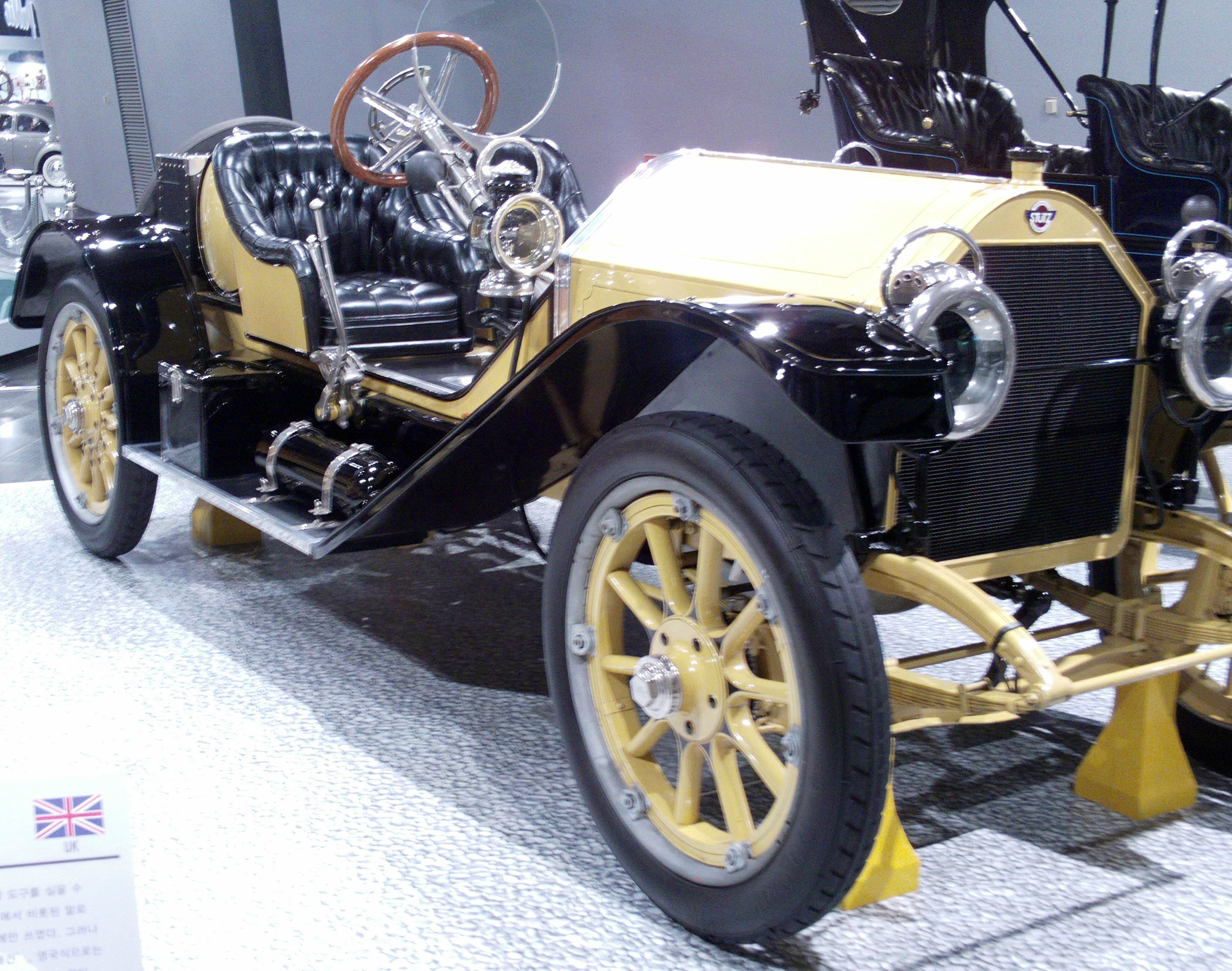
1912 Stutz Bearcat

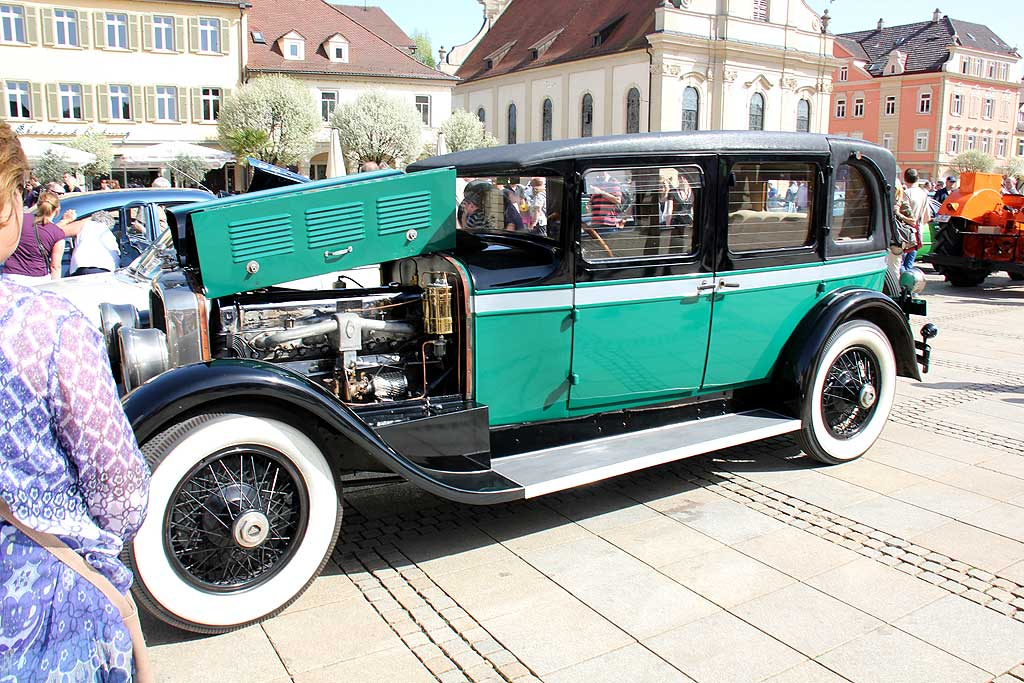
1926 Stutz Vertical Eight AA landaulet

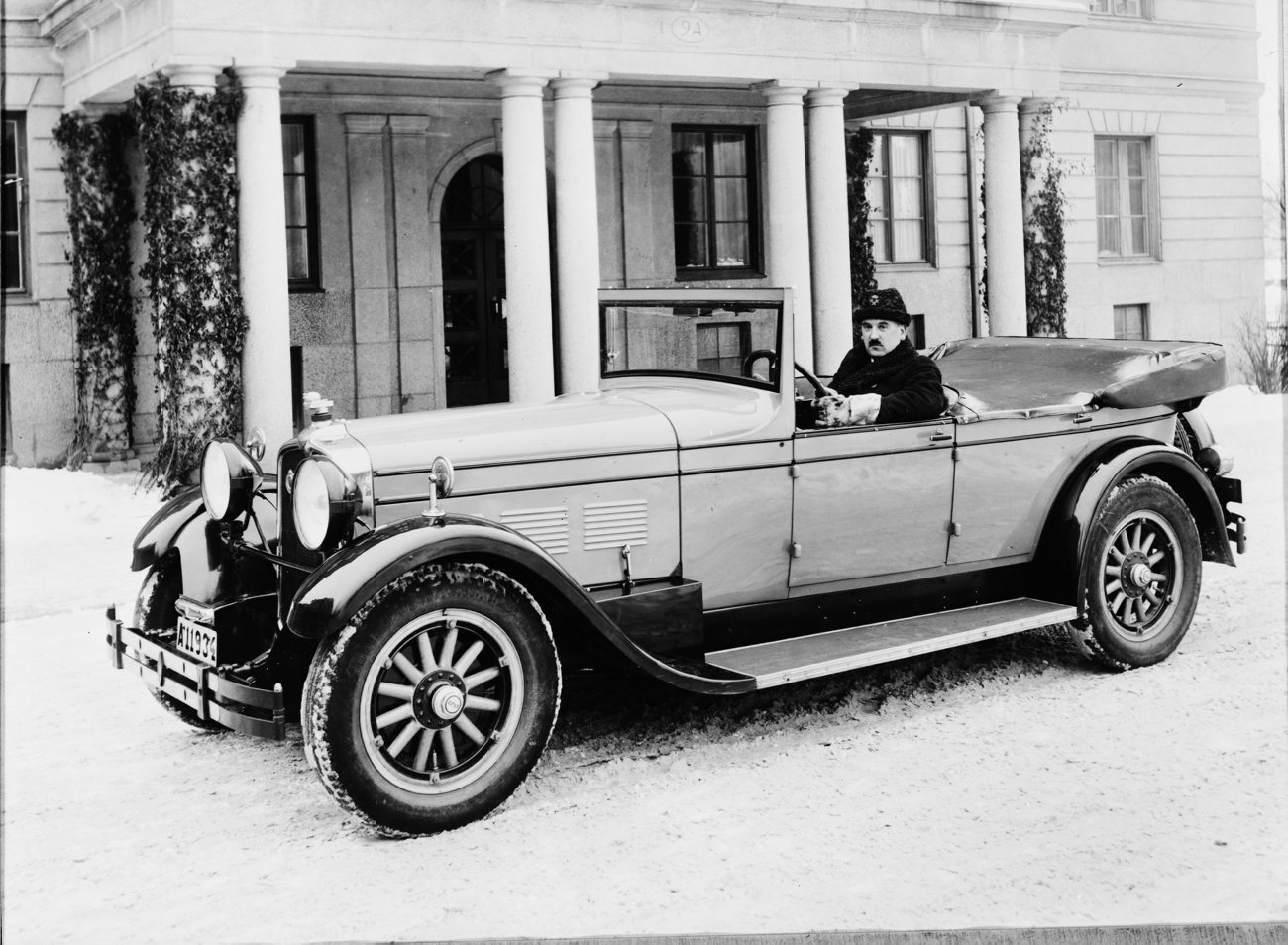
1927 Stutz Vertical Eight AA touring car

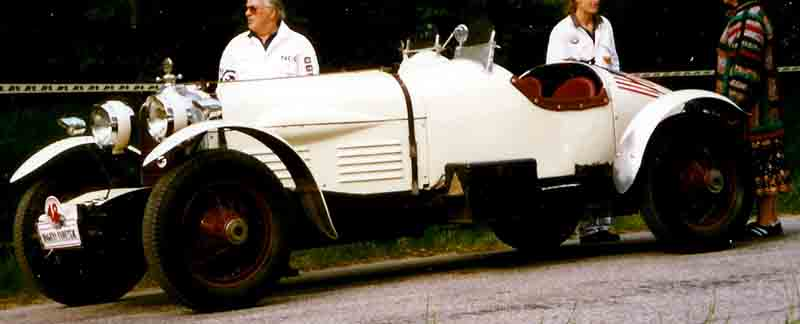
1928 Stutz Blackhawk 5-Litre Indyracer

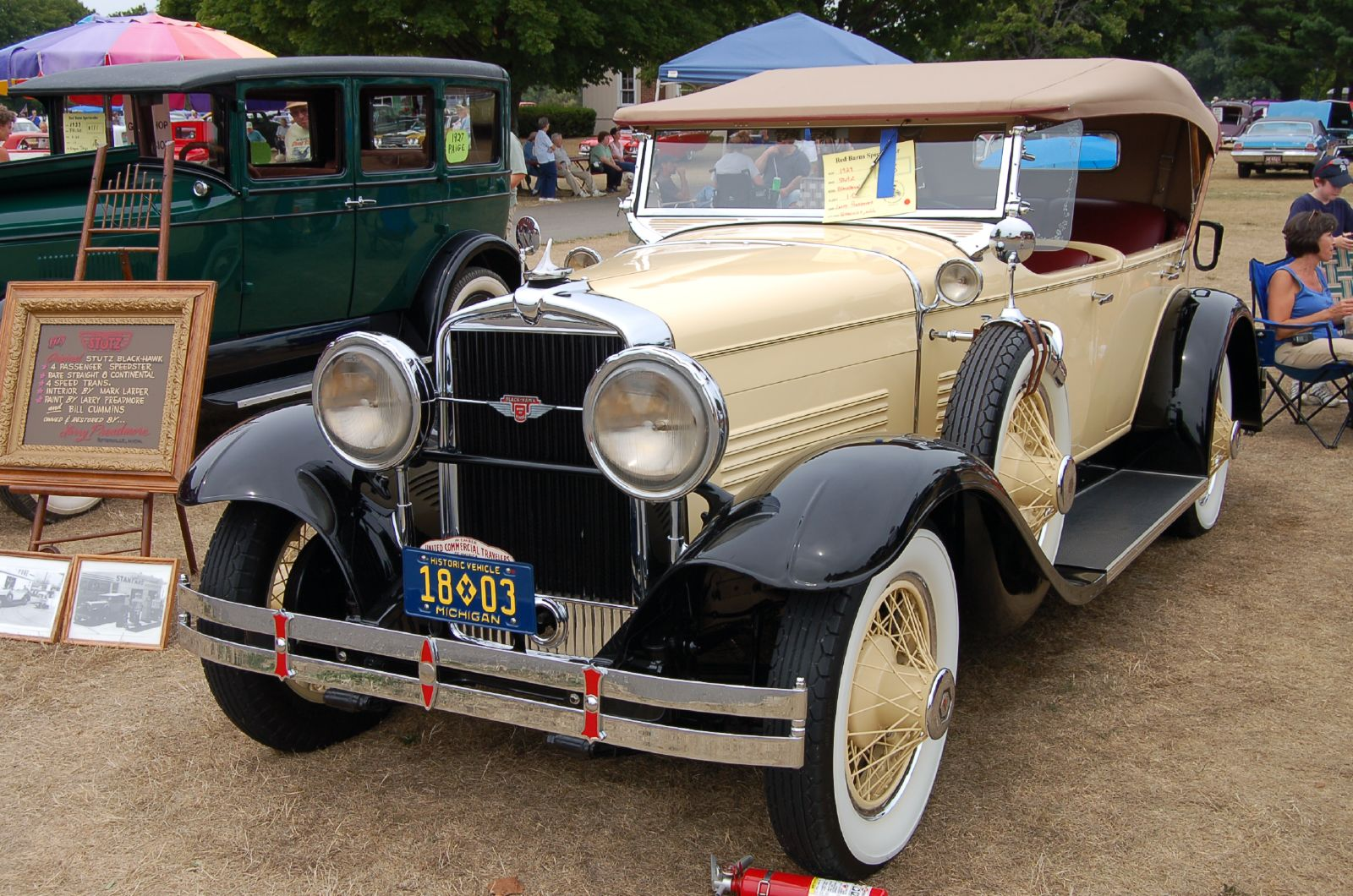
An original 1929 Stutz Blackhawk

The Stutz Motor Car Company was an American automobile manufacturer based in Indianapolis, Indiana that produced high-end sports and luxury cars. The company was founded in 1911 as the Ideal Motor Car Company before merging with the Stutz Auto Parts Company in 1913. Due to the pressures of the Great Depression, the Stutz company went defunct in 1938. The Stutz Motor Car Company produced roughly 39,000 automobiles in their Indianapolis factory during their existence.

The Stutz brand was revived in 1968 as Stutz Motor Car of America, with a focus on producing Neoclassic automobiles. The company is still in existence, but sales of factory-produced vehicles ceased in 1995.

== History ==
The Ideal Motor Car Company, organized in June 1911 by Harry C. Stutz with his friend, Henry F. Campbell, began building Stutz cars in Indianapolis in 1911. They set this business up after a car built by Stutz in under five weeks and entered in the name of his Stutz Auto Parts Co. was placed 11th in the Indianapolis 500 earning it the slogan "the car that made good in a day". Ideal built what amounted to copies of the racecar with added fenders and lights and sold them with the model name Stutz Bearcat, Bear Cat being the name of the actual racecar.

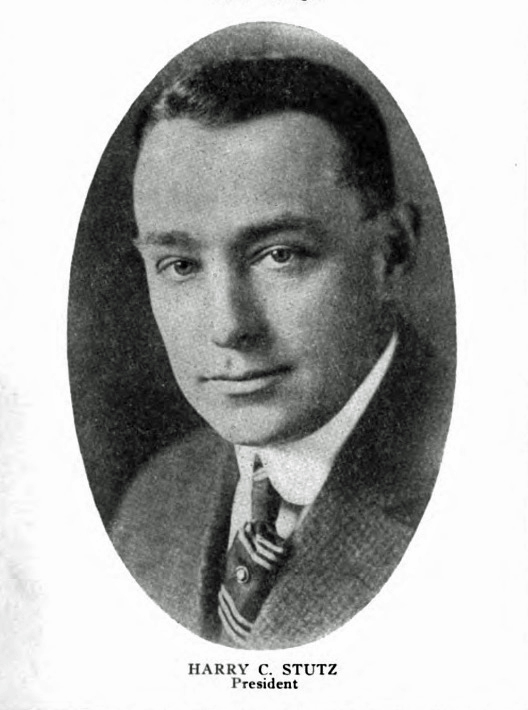
Harry Stutz

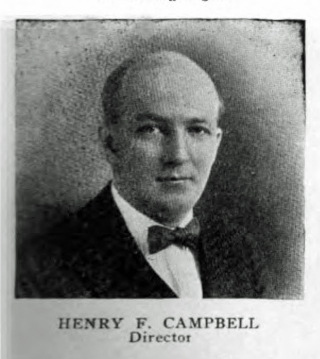
Henry Campbell

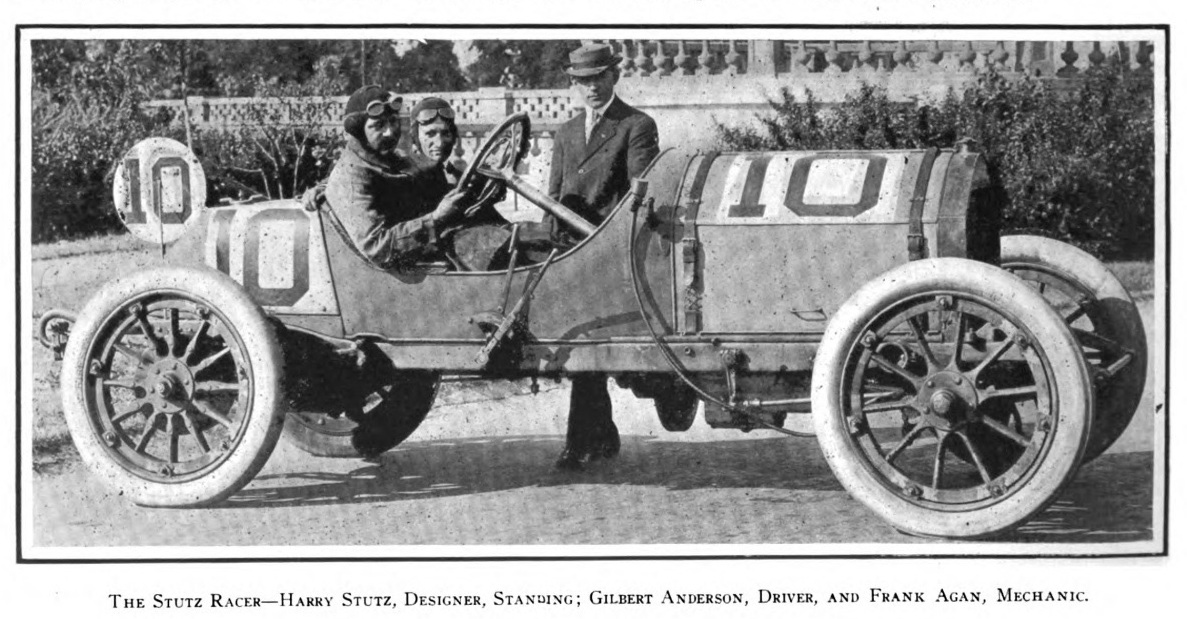
Bear Cat with designer, driver, and riding mechanic 1911

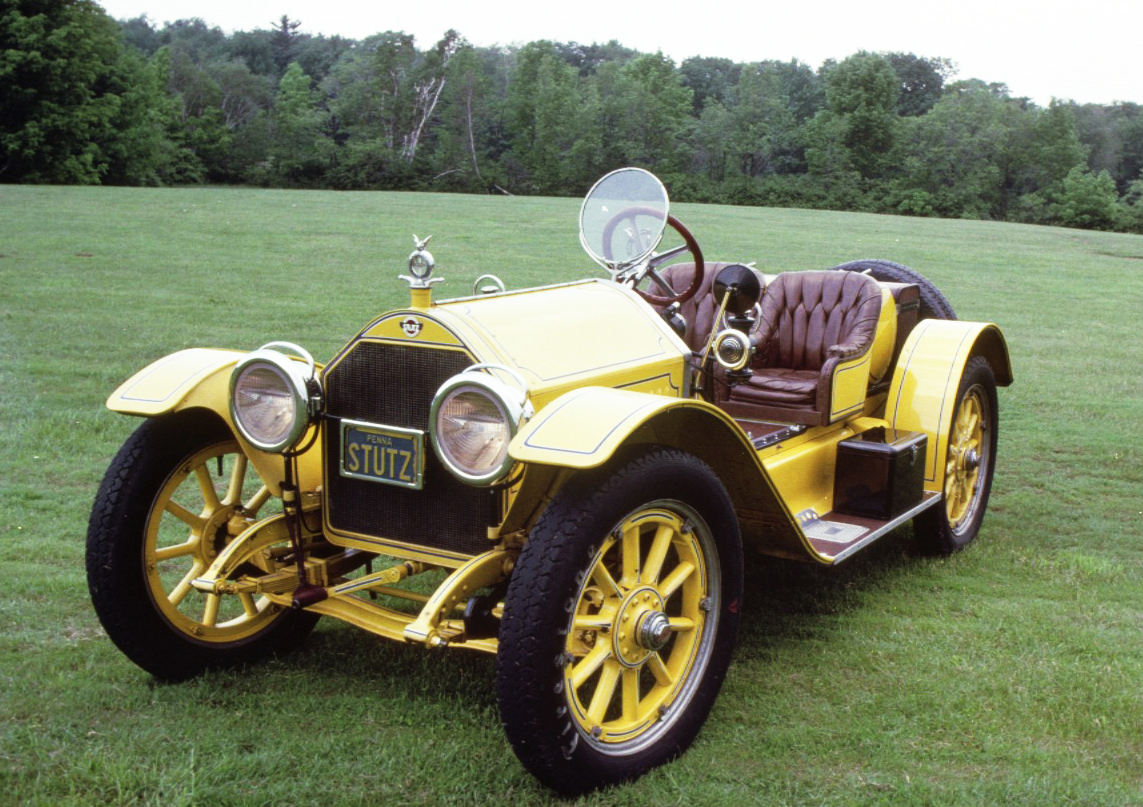
1914 production Stutz Bearcat

The Bearcat featured a 389 cu in (6.4 L) Wisconsin brawny four-cylinder T-head engine with four valves per cylinder, one of the earliest multi-valve engines, matched with one of Harry Stutz's transaxles. Stutz Motor has also been credited with the development of "the underslung chassis," an invention that greatly enhanced the safety and cornering of motor vehicles and one that is still in use today. Stutz's "White Squadron" race team won the 1913 and 1915 national championships before withdrawing from racing in October 1915.

Cars produced
1912	266
1913	759
1914	649
1915	1,079
1916 (first 6 mos)	874
Total (as independent company)	3,627
1916	1,535

From	Until	Profits
June 30, 1911	June 30, 1912	$115,784
July 1, 1912	Dec 31, 1913	292,080
Jan 1, 1914	Dec 31, 1914	151,106
Jan 1, 1915	Dec 31, 1915	366,475
Jan 1, 1916	May 31, 1916	267,982
Total		$1,193,427

The capital consisted of 500 shares par $100, split 2-for-1 on November 12, 1912.

Dividends per share
Dec 4, 1913	$50
April 16, 1915	150
Feb 17, 1916	250
June 5, 1916	250
July 8, 1916 (Note: As income of the new holding Company.)	125
Total	$825

In June 1913 Ideal Motor Car Company changed its name to Stutz Motor Car Company (of Indiana) and Stutz Auto Parts Company (it manufactured Stutz's transaxle) was merged into it.

=== Stutz Motor Car Company of America ===
The Stutz Motor Car Company of America (incorporated in New York on June 22, 1916) issued 75,000 no par shares at $5 per share for cash with which to acquire the entire capital stock of the Indiana company. The new holding company was listed on the New York Stock Exchange in 1916. Stutz, Campbell, Allan A. Ryan, and four others were directors. Stutz was president and Allan A. Ryan vice-president.

Harry Stutz left Stutz Motor on July 1, 1919, and together with Henry Campbell established the H. C. S. Motor Car Company and Stutz Fire Apparatus Company.

Stutz Motor Common Stock Price Range (Note: 1916 1917 1918 1919 1920)
	Year		Jan	Feb	Mar	Apr	May	Jun	Jul	Aug	Sep	Oct	Nov	Dec
1916	79 1/2	High									79 1/2	71	68	64 1/2
1916	48 1/2	Low									68	63 1/2	63	48 1/2
1917	53 3/4	High	53 3/4	50	47 1/4	45	43	41 1/4	45 7/8	45 1/2	41	42 1/2	37 1/2	39
1917	31 1/4	Low	48	44 1/2	44 1/4	42 1/2	41 1/2	31 1/4	36 1/2	40 1/2	39 1/2	37 3/4	35 3/4	35 3/4
1918	55	High	47	47 3/4	43 1/2	46 3/4	45	42 3/4	40 3/4	39 3/4	39 1/4	43	48 3/4	55
1918	37	Low	38 3/4	43 1/8	41 1/4	43 1/2	43	42 1/2	40	39 3/4	38	37	42	45
1919	144 7/8	High	51	50 1/8	54	60	70	75 1/8	125 1/8	117	122	144 7/8	133 5/8	116 5/8
1919	42 1/4	Low	46	42 1/4	46 1/4	50 1/2	56 1/2	67 1/2	72 3/4	99	104	117	103 5/8	107
1920	391	High	137 1/2	130	391									
1920	100 3/4	Low	116	100 3/4	113									

Allan Aloysius Ryan (1880–1940), father of Allan A. Ryan Jr., was left in control of Stutz Motor. Ryan Sr., and friends attempted stock manipulation which in April 1920 proved disastrous. Stutz Motor was delisted. The Stutz Motor corner was the last publicly detected intentional corner on the New York Stock Exchange. Ryan Sr., was bankrupt in August 1922 as well as disinherited by his father, Thomas Fortune Ryan. Meanwhile, two friends of Thomas Fortune Ryan found themselves with large parcels of Stutz stock, Charles Michael Schwab and Eugene Van Rensselaer Thayer Jr. (1881–1937), president of Chase National Bank.

The new owners brought in Frederick Ewan Moskowics, formerly of Daimler-Motoren-Gesellschaft, Marmon, and Franklin, in 1923. Moskowics quickly refocused the company as a developer of safety cars, a recurring theme in the auto industry. In the case of Stutz, the car featured safety glass, a low center of gravity for better handling, and a hill-holding transmission called "Noback". A significant advance was the 1931 DOHC 32-valve in-line 8 called the "DV32" (DV for 'dual valve'). This was during the so-called "cylinders race" of the early 1930s when makers of some expensive cars were rushing to produce multi-cylinder engines. However, Stutz continued its performance heritage with the dual overhead cam, in-line 8 engine design. Brochures boasted the cars were capable of top speeds of more than 100 mph (160 km/h).

The following year, a 4.9-liter (300 in^{3}) Stutz (entered and owned by wealthy French pilot and inventor Charles Weymann) in the hands of by Robert Bloch and Edouard Brisson finished second at the 24 Hours of Le Mans (losing to the 4.5-liter [270 in^{3}] Bentley of Rubin and Barnato, despite losing top gear 90 minutes from the flag), the best result for an American car until 1966. That same year, development engineer and racing driver Frank Lockhart used a pair of supercharged 91-cubic-inch (1.49 L) DOHC engines in his Stutz Black Hawk Special streamliner land speed record car, while Stutz set another speed record at Daytona Beach, reaching 106.53 mph (171.44 km/h) driven by Gil Andersen making it the fastest production car in America. Also in 1927, Stutz won the AAA Championship winning every race and every Stutz vehicle entered finished. In 1929, three Stutzes, with bodies designed by Gordon Buehrig, built by Weymann's U.S. subsidiary, and powered by a 155 hp (116 kW; 157 PS), 322 cu in (5.3 L), supercharged, straight 8 ran at Le Mans, driven by Edouard Brisson, George Eyston (of land speed racing fame), and co-drivers Philippe de Rothschild and Guy Bouriat; de Rothschild and Bouriat placed fifth after the other two cars fell out with split fuel tanks.

Stutz Motor acquired the manufacturing rights for the Pak-Age-Car, a light delivery vehicle that they had been distributing since 1927. A total of 15 new Stutz models were introduced at the 1932 New York Motor Show by Charles Schwab including the Pak-Age-Car. The delivery vehicle was put into production by Stutz's Package Car Division in March 1933 and the production of automobiles stopped. When production ended in 1935 35,000 cars had been manufactured. Stutz Motor was charged by stock manipulation again in 1935, but without the excesses that occurred in 1920.

Stutz Motor filed for bankruptcy in April 1937, though its assets exceeded its liabilities. Creditors were unable to agree on a plan for revival and in April 1939, the bankruptcy court ordered its liquidation.

=== Models ===
  - 1911–1925 Stutz Bearcat
  - 1929–1930 BlackHawk
  - 1926–1935 Stutz Vertical Eight
    - Stutz Vertical Eight AA
    - Stutz Vertical Eight BB
    - Stutz Vertical Eight M
    - Stutz Vertical Eight MA
    - Stutz Vertical Eight MB
    - Stutz Vertical Eight SV-16
    - Stutz Vertical Eight DV-32

Year	Production Stutz	Production Blackhawk	Model
1912	266		
1913	759		
1914	649		
1915	1,079		
1916	1,535		
1917	2,207		
1918	1,873		
1919	1,544		
1920	2,786		Model H
1921	3,860		
1922	769		
1923	1,602		
1924	2,167		
1925	2,190		
1926	3,692		
1927	2,906		
1928	2,403		
1929	2,320	1,310	
1930	1,038	280	
1931	310		
1932	206		
1933	80		
1934	6		
1935	2		
Sum	36,249	1,590	

== Gallery ==
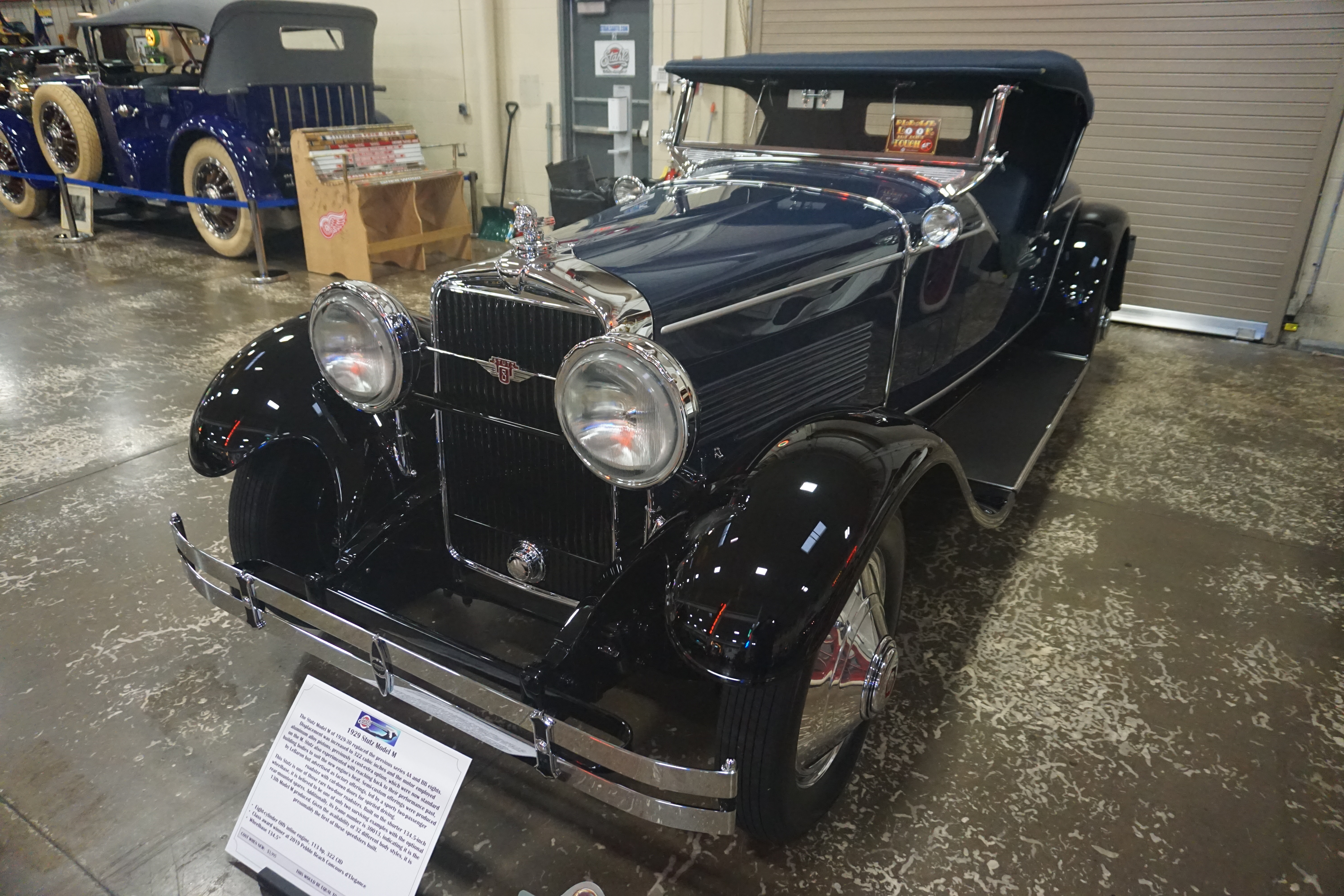
1929 Stutz Model M

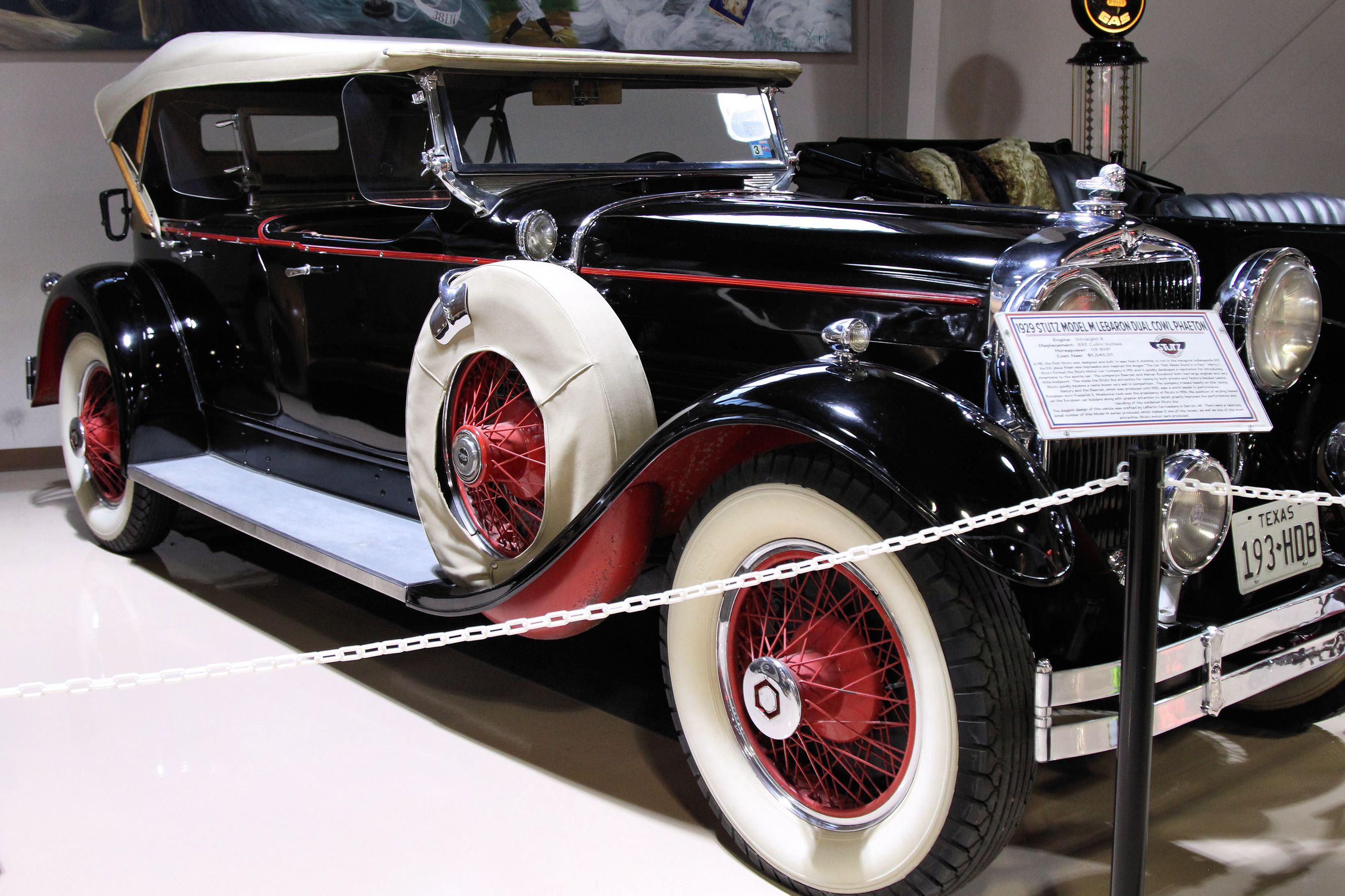
1929 Stutz Model M LeBaron

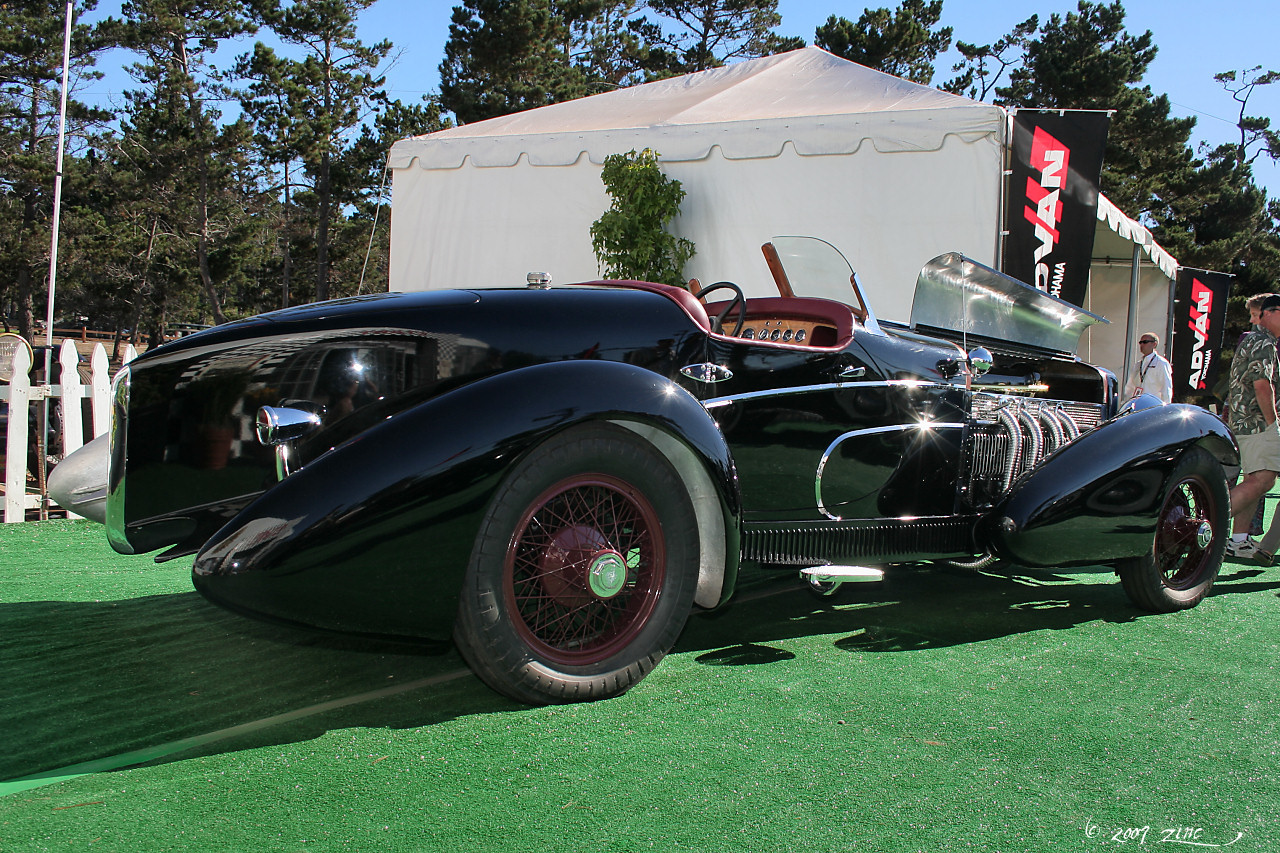
1929 Stutz Roadster Supercharged

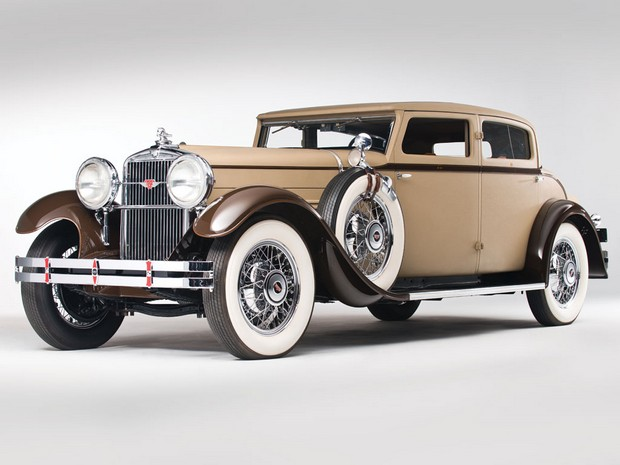
1930 Stutz SV16 Monte Carlo

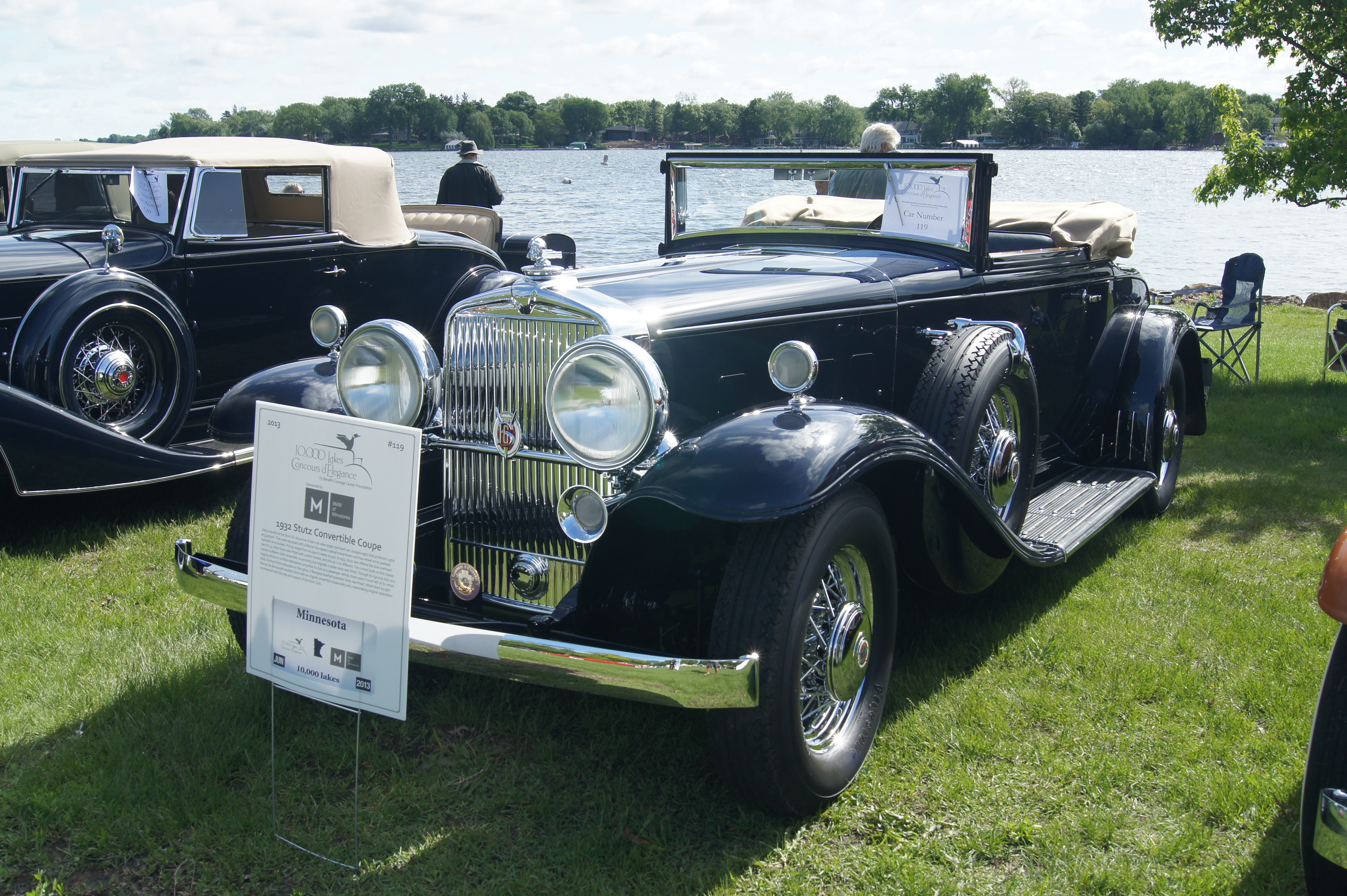
1932 Stutz Convertible Coupe SV-16

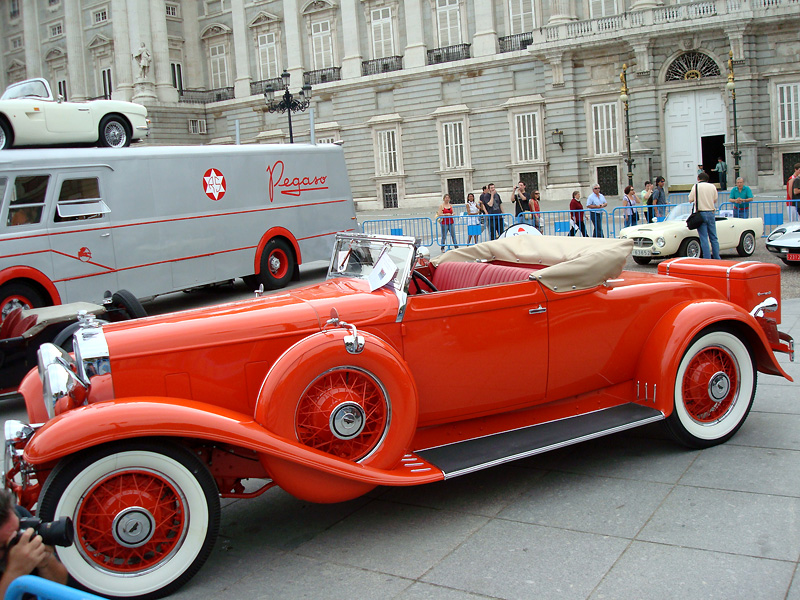
1932 Stutz Vertical Eight SV-16 roadster body by Derham

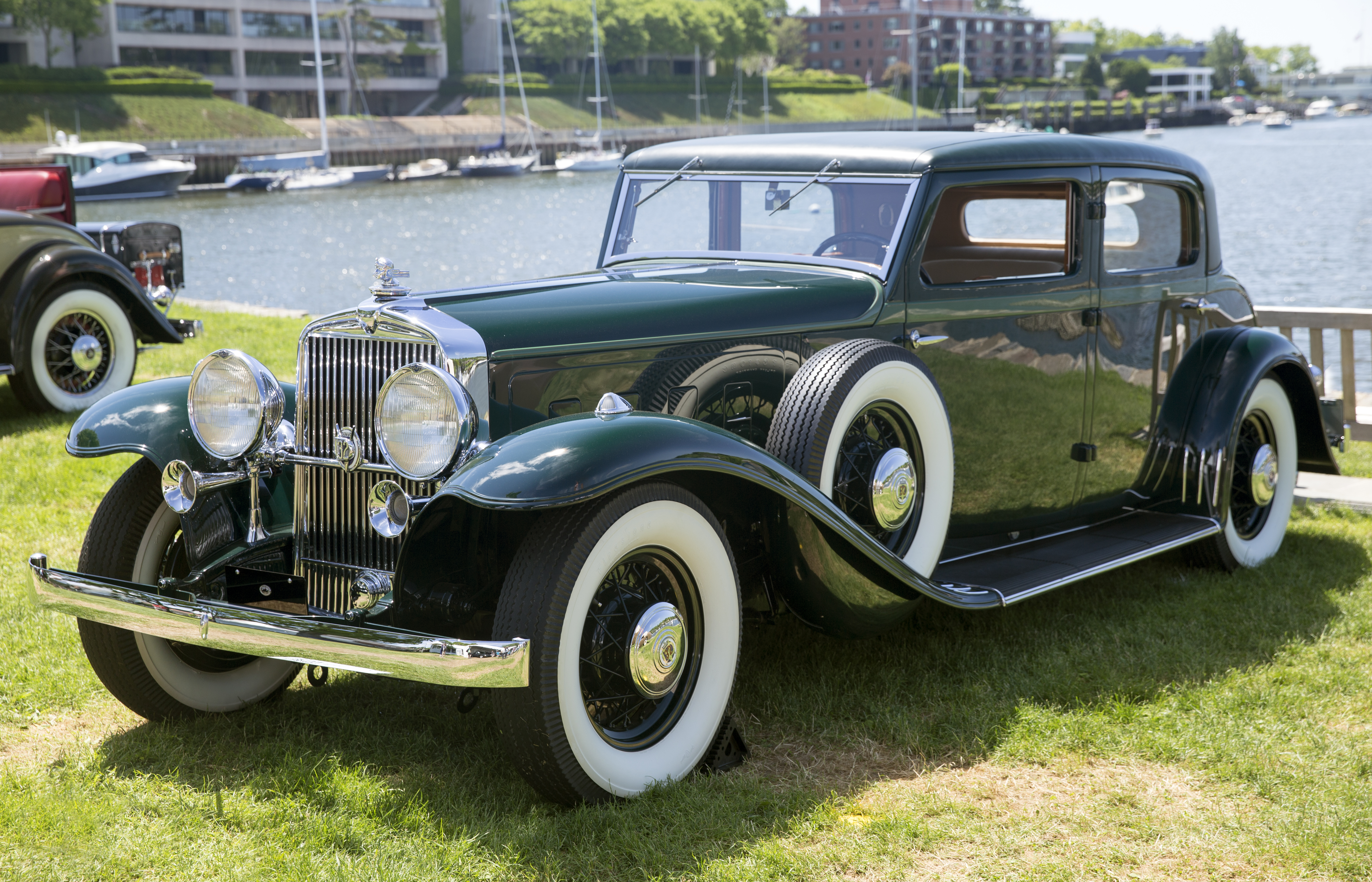
1933 Stutz DV-32 Monte Carlo by Weymann

== Stutz Motor Car Company Factory ==
- Stutz Motor Car Company Factory
- U.S. National Register of Historic Places
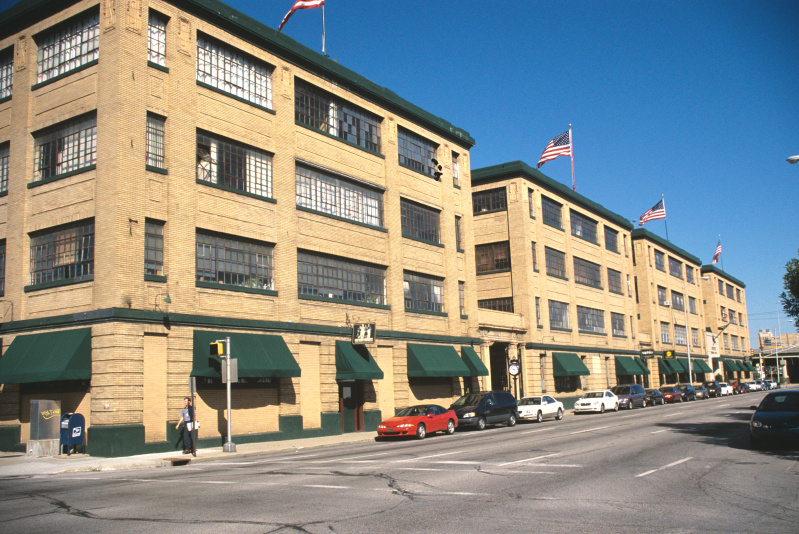

- Location within Indianapolis Location within Indiana Location within the United States
- Location: 1060 North Capitol Ave. and 217 West 10th St., Indianapolis, Indiana, U.S.
- Coordinates: 39°46′54″N 86°9′43″W
- Area: 5 acres (2.0 ha)
- Built: 1911, 1914
- Architects: Donald Graham (1911); Rubush & Hunter (1916-1920)
- Architectural style: Daylight factory
- NRHP reference No.: 100008060
- Added to NRHP: August 23, 2022

The Stutz Motor Car Company Factory, now known as the Stutz Factory, was the manufacturing facility and former headquarters of the Stutz Motor Company located at 1060 North Capitol Ave. and 217 West 10th St. in downtown Indianapolis, Indiana. The site consists of two building, the Stutz Factory and the Ideal Motor Car Company Building. The Stutz Factory (now known as Stutz I) occupies 5 acres (2.0 ha) of space, bounded by West 11th and 10th streets to the north and south and North Capitol and Senate avenues to the east and west. The Ideal Motor Car Company building (now known as Stutz II) is located directly to the south of the factory, with its boundaries as West 10th street to the north, North Senate Avenue to the west, and Roanoke Street to the east.

Both structures were added to the National Register of Historic Places in 2022.

=== Buildings ===
The original Ideal Motor Car Company building was constructed on the southwest corner of West 10th and North Roanoke streets in 1911. This portion of the building was added to in 1937, bringing the northwest portion of the building to three stories. A large-scale addition occurred 1941, which expanded the building's overall footprint to North Senate Avenue. The building was again expanded in 1946 and c. 1970. Other than the part of the building updated in 1937, the remaining structure is one story and constructed with concrete.

The factory site is a set of seven interconnected buildings constructed between 1914 and c. 1967. Each building is constructed using concrete, and are connected by brick bridges across the upper three stories. The first building of the factory (Building A) was constructed on the southeast corner of the city block, at the northwest corner of West 10th Street and North Capitol Avenues. The second building (Building B) was built in 1916 directly to the north of Building A. The third structure (Building F) was built in 1917, and added to in 1919, on the southwest corner of the city block. Buildings C and D were built to the north of Buildings B and F, and completed in 1920. Building E was also completed in 1920, and located directly to the north of Building C. Lastly, Building G was an addition to Building D that was completed around 1967. Buildings A, B, C, and E are connected using the brick bridges, while Buildings D, F, and G were connected by closing off unused alleys in the 1950s.

The Stutz Factory is constructed in the Daylight Factory style. Daylight Factory is a type of reinforced concrete frame industrial building that utilized a patented modular structural system that allowed larger windows and increased lighting into the building.

=== Adaptive reuse ===
After the Stutz company folded, Eli Lilly and Company moved into the space in 1940. Lilly used the factory to house its Creative Packaging division until 1982.

After sitting vacant for more than a decade, Indianapolis-based real estate developer Turner Woodard purchased the Stutz Factory in 1993. Woodard reimagined the space as an artist community, with an annual artist showcase that became a focal point of the Indianapolis arts community. The building also housed other small businesses.

In 2021, Woodard sold the building to real estate investment firm SomeraRoad, who planned to redevelop the site into a work-play destination. After a $100 million redevelopment, the new Stutz site reopened in May 2023 with restaurants, a coffee shop, a bakery, and a bar. The building is also the house of the annual "Butter" fine art fair put on by GANGGANG and a number of artist spaces.

== Revival as Stutz Motor Car of America ==
Stutz Motor Car of America
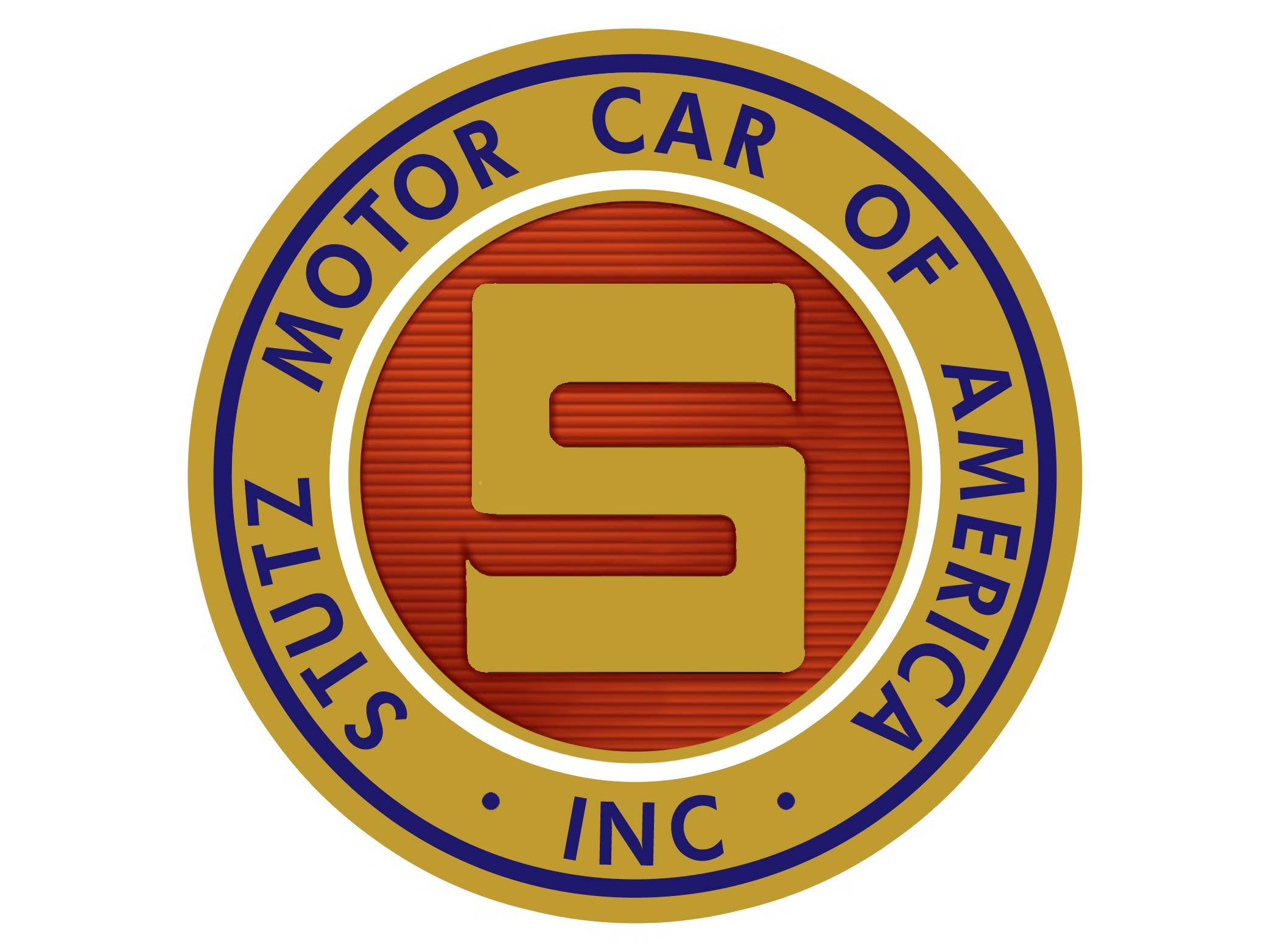
- Industry: Automobile manufacturing; Engine manufacturing
- Founded: Indianapolis, Indiana, United States (1968)
- Headquarters: Indianapolis, Indiana, United States
- Area served: Worldwide
- Services: Luxury vehicles

In August 1968, New York banker James O'Donnell raised funds and incorporated Stutz Motor Car of America. A prototype of Virgil Exner's Stutz Blackhawk was produced by Ghia, and the car debuted in 1970. All these cars used General Motors running gear, featuring perimeter-type chassis frames, automatic transmission, power steering and power brakes with discs at the front. Features included electric windows, air conditioning, central locking, electric seats, and leather upholstery. The sedans typically included a console for beverages in the rear seat. Engines were V8s, originally 400 or 460 cubic inches (6.6 or 7.5 L), but by 1984 the Victoria, Blackhawk, and Bearcat came with a 160 hp (119 kW; 162 PS), 350.0-cubic-inch (5.7 L) engine while the Royale had a 424.8-cubic-inch (7.0 L) Oldsmobile engine rated at 180 hp (134 kW; 182 PS).

This incarnation of Stutz had some reasonable success selling newly designed Blackhawks, Bearcats, Royale Limousines, IV Portes, and Victorias. Elvis Presley bought the first Blackhawk in 1971, and later purchased three more. Frank Sinatra, Dean Martin, Evel Knievel, Barry White, and Sammy Davis Jr. all owned Stutz cars. The Stutz Blackhawk owned by Lucille Ball was for a time on display at the Imperial Palace Hotel and Casino Auto Collection in Las Vegas. The Stutz was marketed as the "World's Most Expensive Car" with a Royale limousine priced at $285,000 (equivalent to $883,208 in 2025) and a Blackhawk coupé over US$115,000 (equivalent to $356,382 in 2025) in 1984. However, other producers sold secret cars for much more, and the much more expensive Ferrari F40 appeared just two years later.

Production was limited and an estimated 617 cars were built during the company's first 25 years of existence (1971–1995). Sales of Stutz began to wane in 1985, but continued until 1995. Warren Liu became its main shareholder and took over ownership of Stutz Motor Cars in 1982.

=== Stutz models II ===
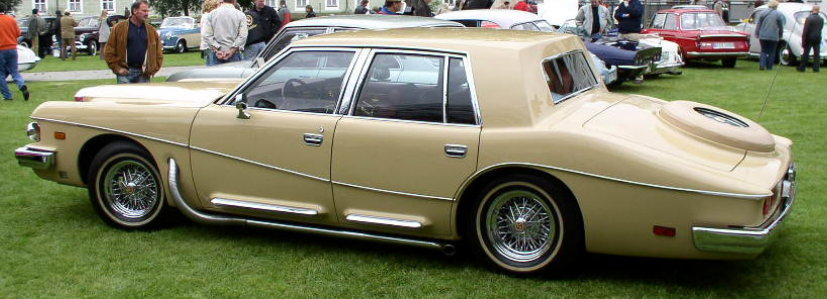
1979 Stutz IV-Porte

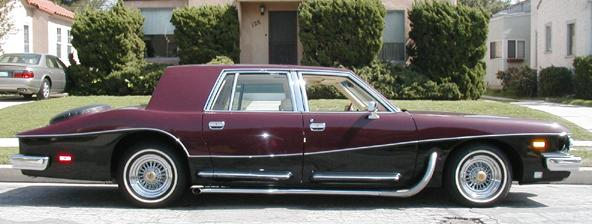
1982 Stutz Victoria

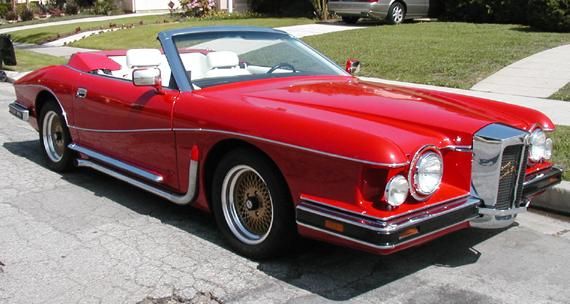
1988 Stutz Bearcat II

- Stutz Motor Car of America (Neoclassic automobiles)
  - 1970–1987 Blackhawk (coupe)
    - 1970–1979 - based on the Pontiac Grand Prix
    - 1980–1987 - based on the Pontiac Bonneville
  - 1979–1995 Bearcat (convertible)
    - 1977 - a converted Blackhawk
    - 1979 - based on the Pontiac Grand Prix
    - 1980–1986 - based on the Pontiac Bonneville, Buick LeSabre, or Oldsmobile Delta 88 Royale
    - 1987–1995 - based on the Pontiac Firebird or Chevrolet Camaro
  - 1970–1987 Duplex/IV-Porte/Victoria (sedan)
    - 197? Duplex
    - 1977–1987 IV-Porte - based on the Pontiac Bonneville, Buick LeSabre, or Oldsmobile 88
    - 1981– 1987 Victoria
  - Diplomatica/Royale (limousine)
    - Diplomatica - based on the Cadillac DeVille
    - Royale - super-long limousine
  - 1984– Defender/Gazelle/Bear - a modified and armored Chevrolet Suburban SUV
    - Gazelle - military SUV with mounted machine gun
    - Bear - four-door convertible
