= Mitsuoka (disambiguation) =

Mitsuoka Motors is a Japanese automobile manufacturer.

Mitsuoka may also refer to:

== People ==
- Mitsuoka (surname)

== Mitsuoka Motors cars ==
- Mitsuoka Galue, a name used on two series of cars by Mitsuoka
- Mitsuoka Himiko, a sports car by Mitsuoka
- Mitsuoka Like, a four-door car by Mitsuoka
- Mitsuoka Nouera, a four-door saloon car by Mitsuoka
- Mitsuoka Orochi, a sports car by Mitsuoka
- Mitsuoka Viewt, a car, modified from the Nissan March/Micra, intended to resemble the Jaguar Mark 2

== Other uses ==
- Mitsuoka Station, a railway station on the Koumi Line in the city of Komoro, Nagano Prefecture, Japan
