= Mitsuoka Rock Star =

Light-weight convertible sports car

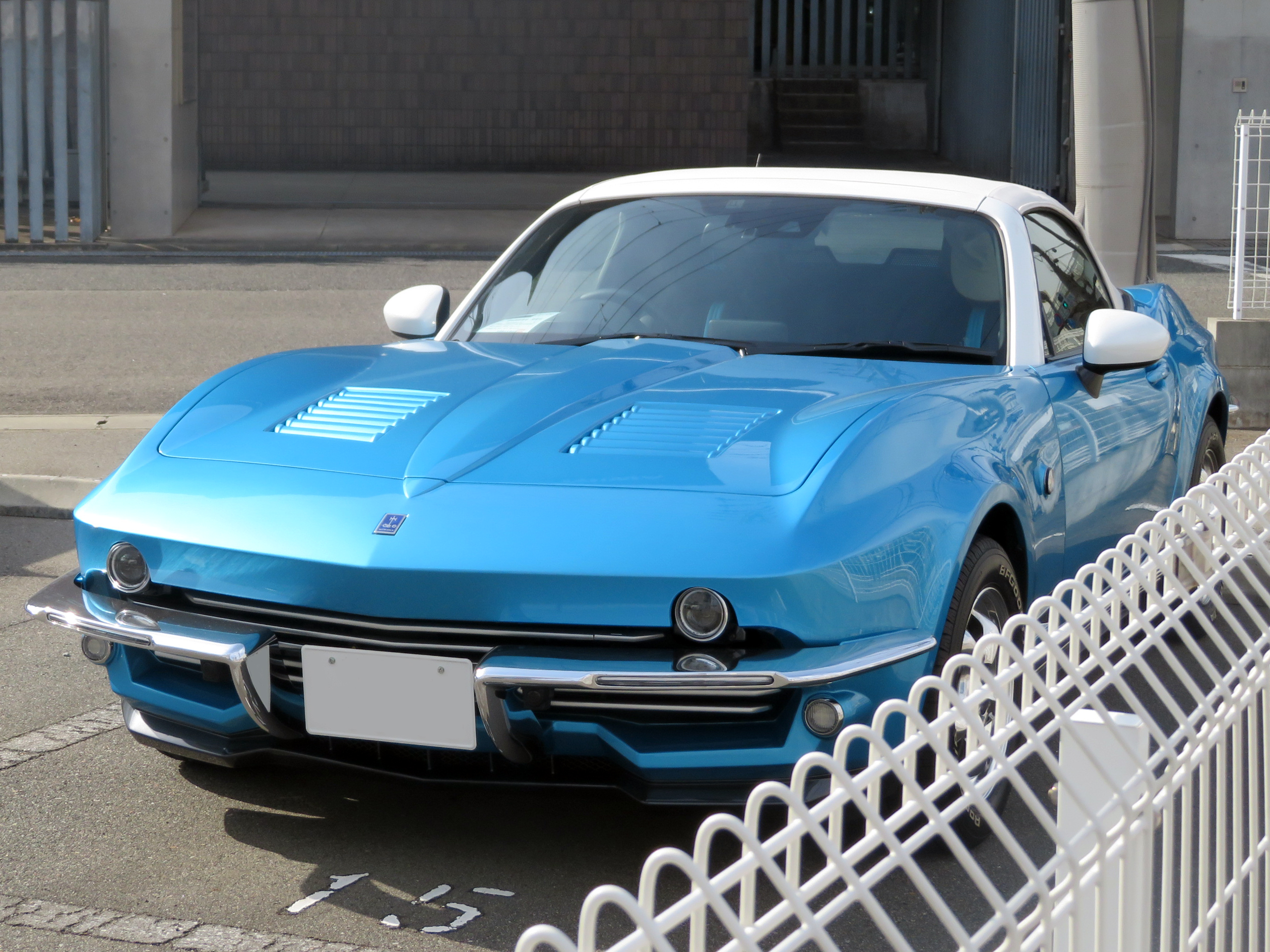

Overview
- Manufacturer: Mitsuoka
- Production: 2018–2022 (200 units)
- Model years: 2019–2022
- Assembly: Japan: Toyama

Body and chassis
- Class: Sports car (S)
- Body style: 2-door convertible
- Layout: Front mid-engine, rear-wheel-drive
- Platform: Mazda ND
- Related: Mazda MX-5 (ND); Mitsuoka Himiko

Powertrain
- Engine: 1.5 L Skyactiv-G (P5-VPS) DOHC I4
- Power output: 96 kW (129 hp; 131 PS) (1.5 L)
- Transmission: 6-speed Skyactiv-MT manual; 6-speed Skyactiv-Drive automatic

Dimensions
- Wheelbase: 2,310 mm (90.9 in)
- Length: 4,310 mm (169.7 in)
- Width: 1,770 mm (69.7 in)
- Height: 1,235 mm (48.6 in)
- Curb weight: 1,080–1,140 kg (2,381.0–2,513.3 lb)

The Mitsuoka Rock Star is a retro-styled sports car produced by Japanese car company Mitsuoka between 2018 and 2022. It was announced as a special model to commemorate the 50th anniversary of Mitsuoka. Based on the fourth generation Mazda MX-5, the front and rear exteriors have been changed to resemble the Chevrolet Corvette (C2). The Rock Star is described as "naughty, stylish, and fun", and in contrast to Himiko, which is also based on the MX-5, it features a masculine and wild style.

== History ==
The Rock Star was announced on November 29, 2018 and reservations were accepted two days later. It was produced by remodeling the fourth generation Mazda MX-5. The main mechanisms such as the P5 type 1.5L in-line 4-cylinder engine are the same as the base model, but the total length has been extended by 430 mm (17 in) in order to aim for more balanced proportions. Unlike the Himiko and Le-Seyde, however, the wheelbase has not changed.

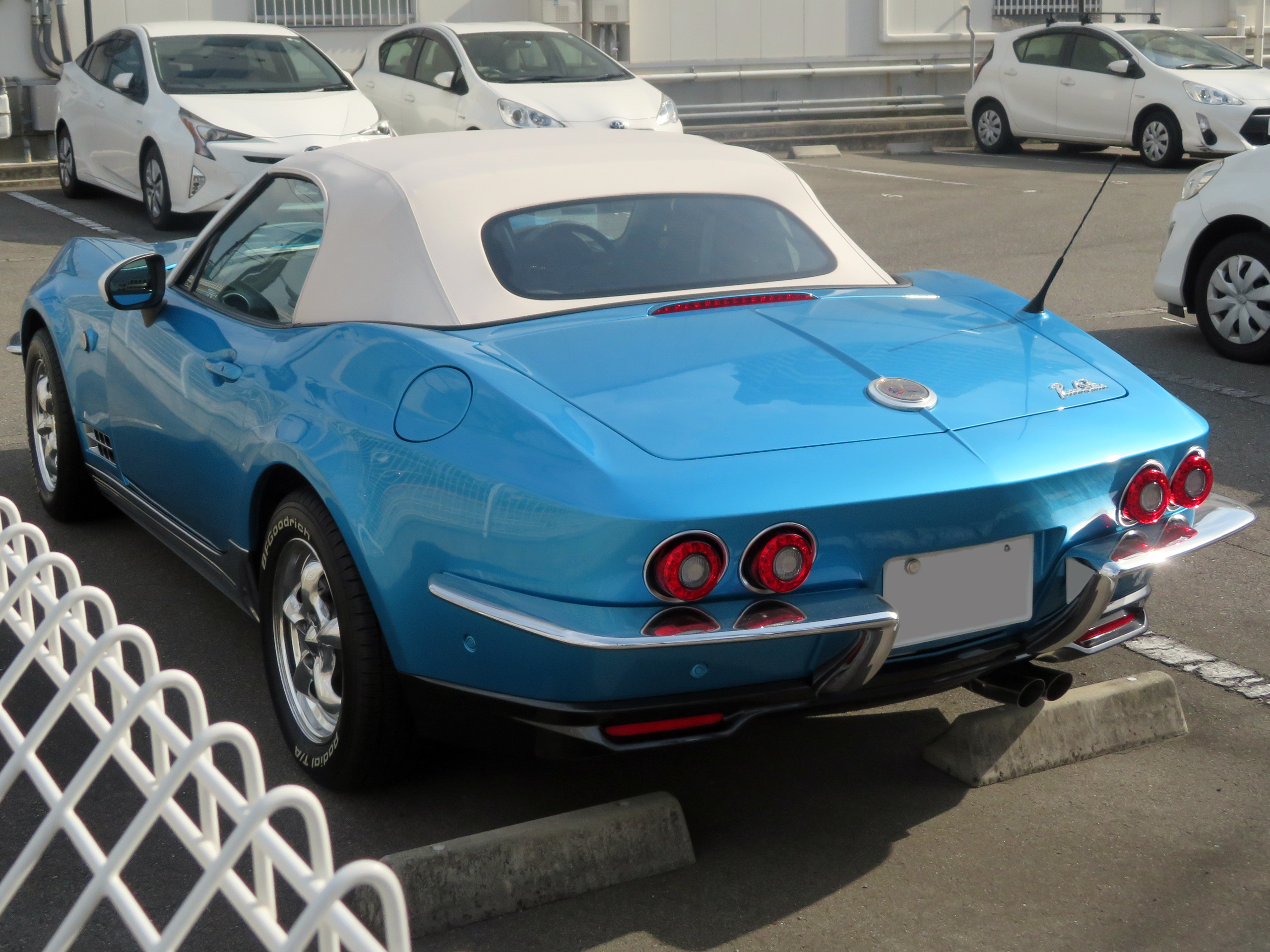
Mitsuoka Rock Star rear

Takanori Aoki, who worked on the Orochi, was in charge of the exterior design. From the beginning, there was no plan to use the C2 Corvette as a motif, but the design was created while searching for idea sketches, and it is said to embody the sense of scale and appearance that Aoki remembered from his junior high school days. The number of sales is limited to 200 units. Pre-orders for customers had already sold out 50 units, leaving 150 units remaining at the time of the announcement. The grade development is the same as the MX-5, and two types of MT-only basic model "S" and high-grade model "S Special Package" were available.

On March 22, 2019, it was announced that 200 units were sold out. On July 23, 2019, a line-off ceremony for the first car was held at the head office factory in Toyama. Mitsuoka had planned to produce and ship 50 units of the Rock Star in 2019, and after that, 75 units in 2020 and 2021.

On January 27, 2022, in commemoration of the complete sale and delivery of Rock Star, it was announced that a lottery sale of the "Rock Star 2.0 LHD Only1 Special" would be held. Based on the 2.0L MX-5, it offers a left-hand drive and a 2.0L engine that the standard model does not have.
