= Mitsuoka Ryoga =

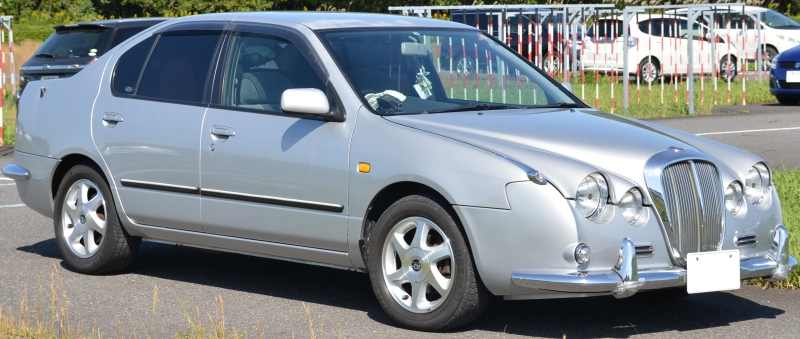
- 1st generation Ryoga

Overview
- Manufacturer: Mitsuoka
- Model years: 1998-2004

Body and chassis
- Class: Compact executive car (D)
- Body style: 4-door sedan 5-door station wagon
- Layout: FF, AWD
- Related: Nissan Sunny; Nissan Primera; Nissan Sentra; Infiniti G20

Powertrain
- Engine: Nissan DOHC 4 cylinder 1.5L QG15DE, 1.8L SR18DE, 2.0L SR20DE I4
- Power output: 78 kW (105 hp) (QG15DE); 92 kW (123 hp) (SR18DE); 110 kW (150 hp) (SR20DE)
- Transmission: 4-speed auto, 5-speed manual, CVT

Dimensions
- Wheelbase: 2,600 mm (102.4 in)
- Length: 4,570 mm (179.9 in)
- Width: 1,695 mm (66.7 in)
- Height: 1,400 mm (55.1 in)
- Curb weight: 1,200 kg (2,646 lb)

The Mitsuoka Ryoga is an Entry-level luxury sedan manufactured by Mitsuoka. There are two versions of it, a wagon and a sedan. It has a fuel tank capacity of 60L. The price of the Ryoga ranges from 2,461,000 yen to 2,871,750 yen.

== First generation ==
When the Ryoga was first released in 1998, it was based on the Nissan Primera and had a 1.8L or 2.0L engine. The 1.8L engine produced 125 hp. The 2.0L engine produced 150 hp.

== Second generation ==
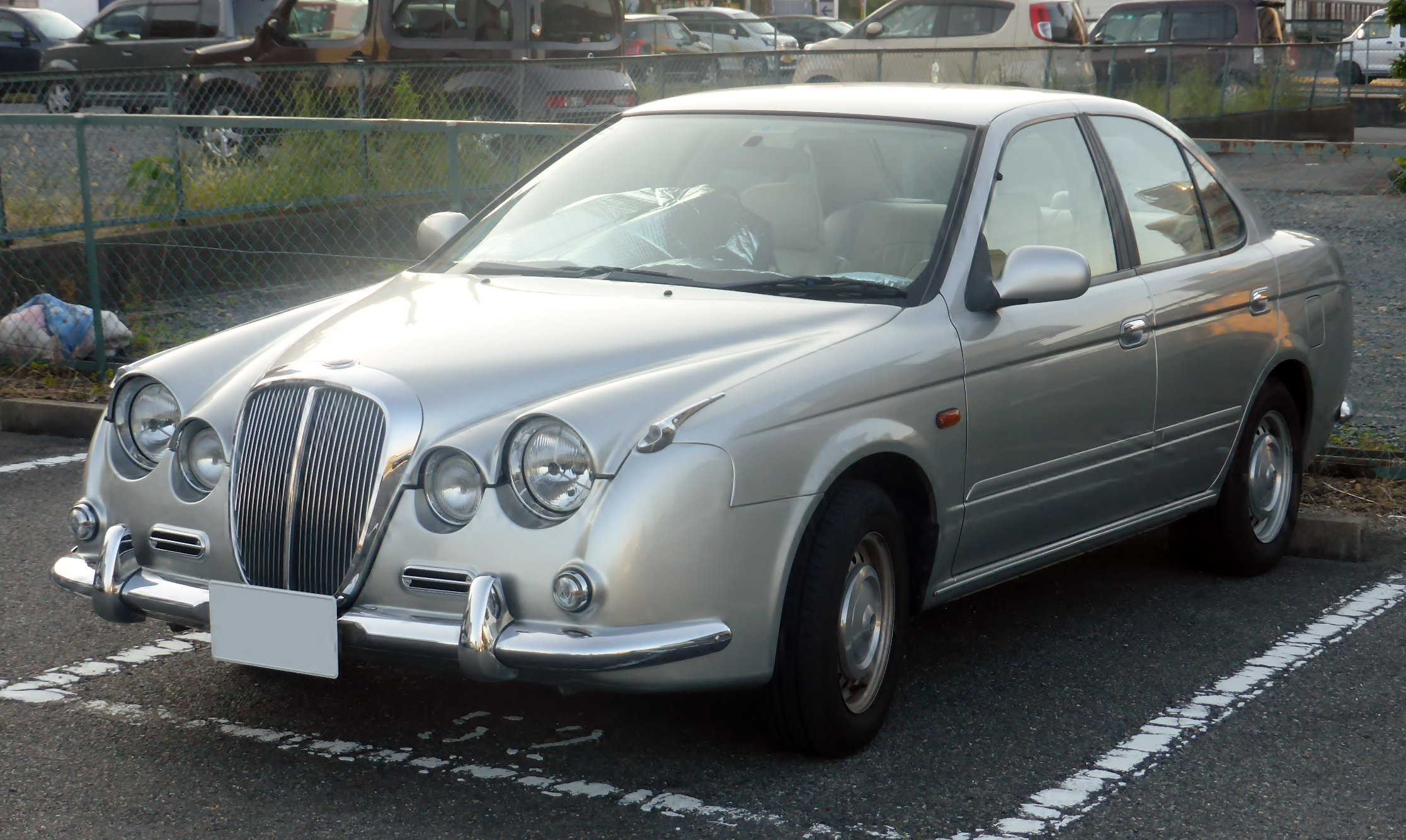
2nd generation Ryoga

When the car entered its second generation, the car became based on the Nissan Sunny and Sentra. This changed the engine size to 1.5L. This 1.5L engine produces 105 hp (78 kW). The Sunny-based Ryoga has a top speed of 177 km/h (110 mph) and a 0–100 km/h (62 mph) time of 13.1 seconds. It is classified as a low emission vehicle.

== Trim levels ==
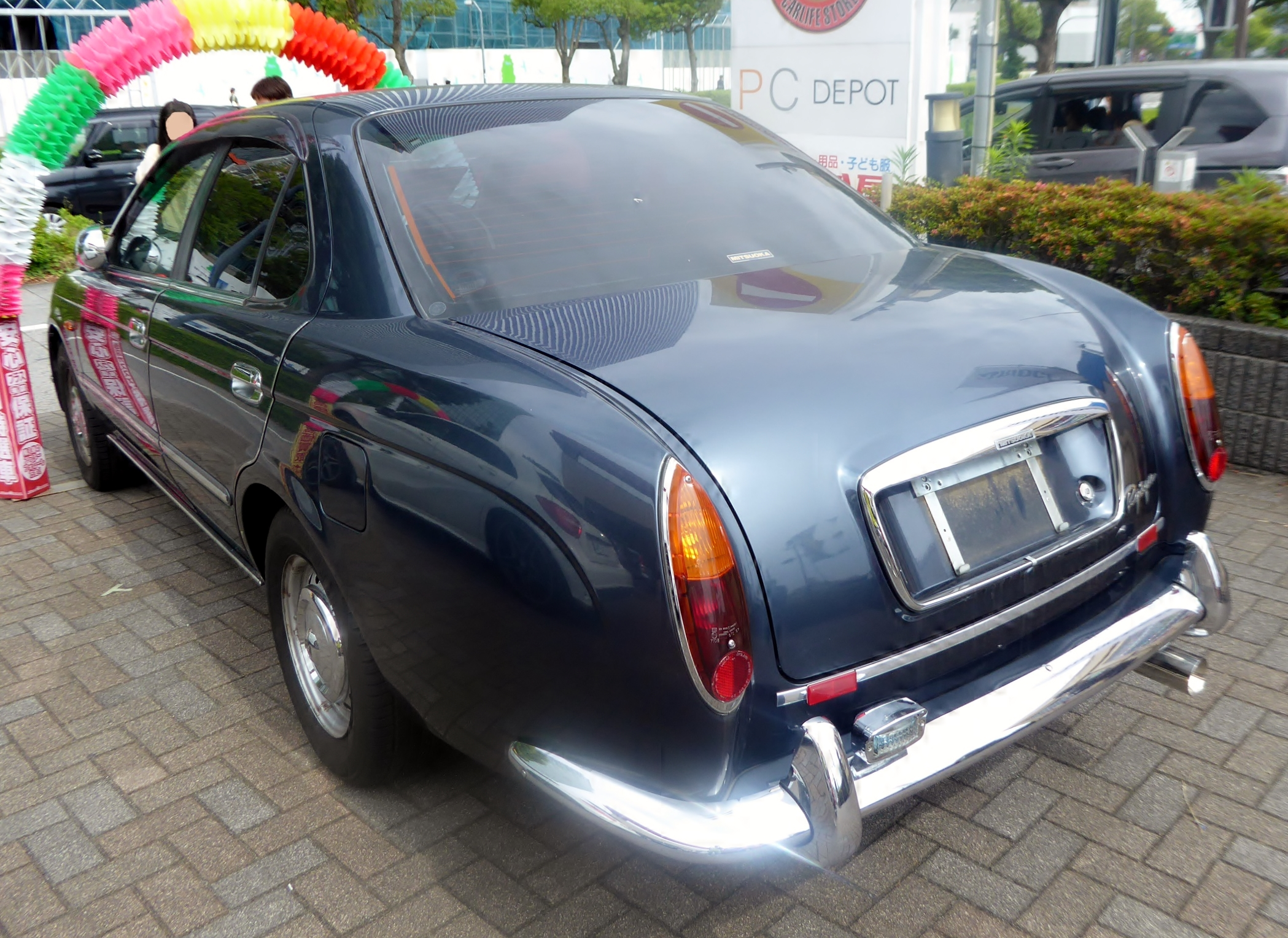
Rear view (1st generation)

There are two trim levels. Royal, which has slightly better equipment and Deluxe. During the 2000 model year there was a larger limited edition with a 1998cc engine. There were two more limited editions in 2004. During that year Mitsuoka released a Soft Leather Edition and a Final Model edition.

== See also ==
- Nissan Primera
- Nissan Sunny
