= Mitsuoka (surname) =

Mitsuoka is a Japanese surname. Notable people with the surname include:

- Eiji Mitsuoka (born 1976), Japanese mixed martial artist
- Masami Mitsuoka, Japanese singer now known as Mizca
- Natalia Mitsuoka, Argentinian figure skater
- Shinya Mitsuoka, Japanese footballer
