= Mitsuoka Ray =

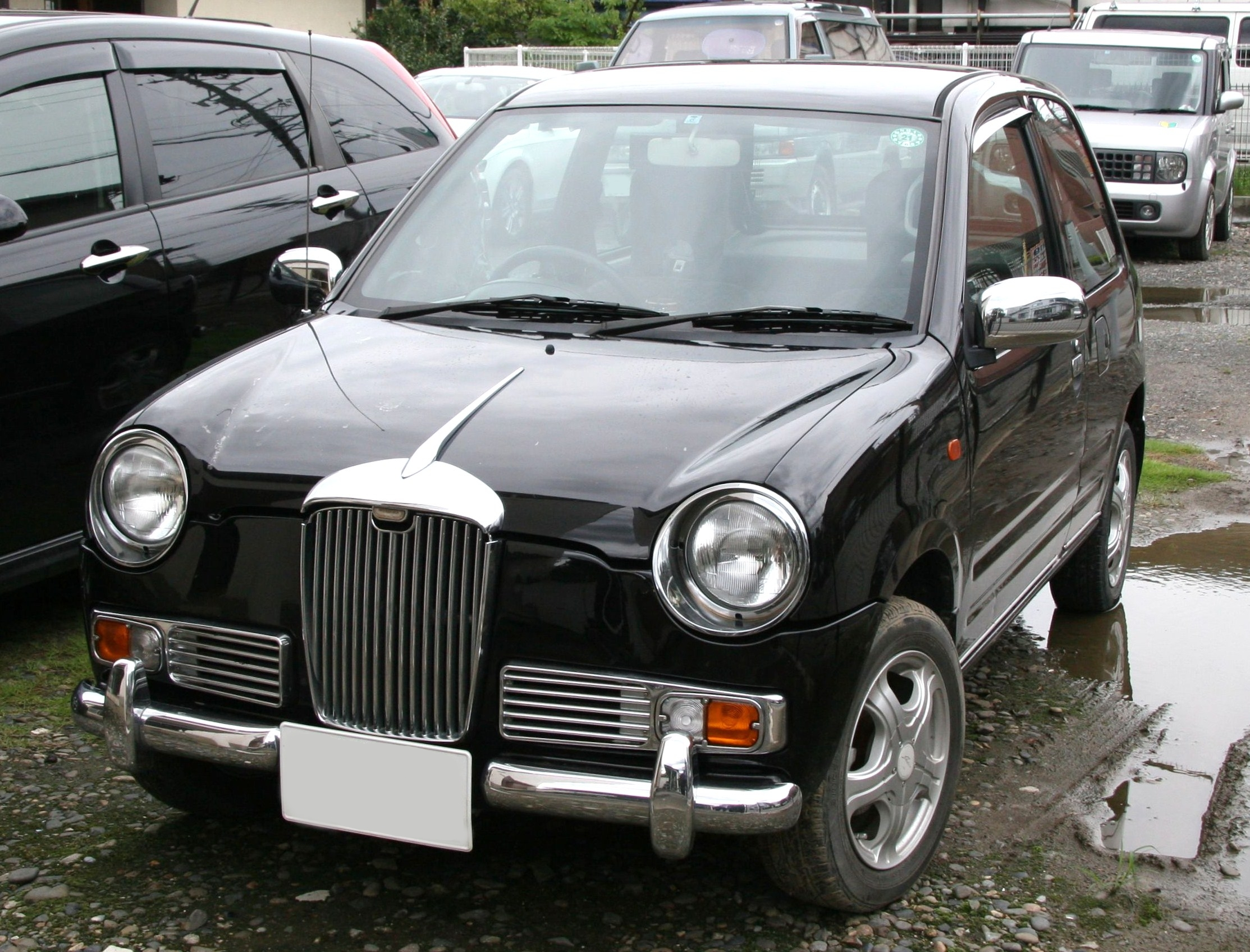
- 1st generation Mitsuoka Ray

Overview
- Manufacturer: Mitsuoka
- Production: 1996–1999 (1st generation); 1999–2000 (2nd generation); 2002–2004 (3rd generation)
- Assembly: Toyama, Toyama, Japan

Body and chassis
- Class: Kei car
- Body style: 3-door hatchback (1st & 2nd generation); 5-door hatchback (2nd & 3rd generation)
- Layout: FF; AWD (3rd generation)
- Related: Mazda Carol/Suzuki Alto (1st & 2nd generation); Daihatsu Mira Gino (3rd generation)

Powertrain
- Engine: 657 cc F6A SOHC 12-valve I3 (1st & 2nd generation); 659 cc EF-VE DOHC 12-valve I3 (3rd generation)
- Transmission: 3-speed automatic (1st & 2nd generation); 4-speed automatic (3rd generation); 5-speed manual (1st generation)

Dimensions
- Wheelbase: 2,335–2,360 mm (91.9–92.9 in)
- Length: 3,295–3,395 mm (129.7–133.7 in)
- Width: 1,395–1,475 mm (54.9–58.1 in)
- Height: 1,420–1,450 mm (55.9–57.1 in)
- Curb weight: 635–810 kg (1,400–1,786 lb)

The Mitsuoka Ray is a compact car produced by Mitsuoka. The first generation was a heavily modified 3rd generation Mazda Carol. It has a 52-58 hp 660 cc gasoline engine. It has a 30-40 L fuel tank. The car started out with 3 doors; however, in 1999 Mitsuoka changed it into a 5-door car based on the 4th generation Mazda Carol and then 1st generation Mira Gino in 2002. The price ranges from 911,000 yen to 1,359,750 yen. Mitsuoka described the Ray as "like a dignified and graceful flower."

== Trims ==
There are two trim levels for the first generation, Basic and Deluxe. Later, only available in single "Base Grade" trim for the last two generations.

== Reception ==
The Mitsuoka Ray received mixed reviews, earning a place on the Ugliest Cars in Britain list due to problems with quality and design.

== Gallery ==
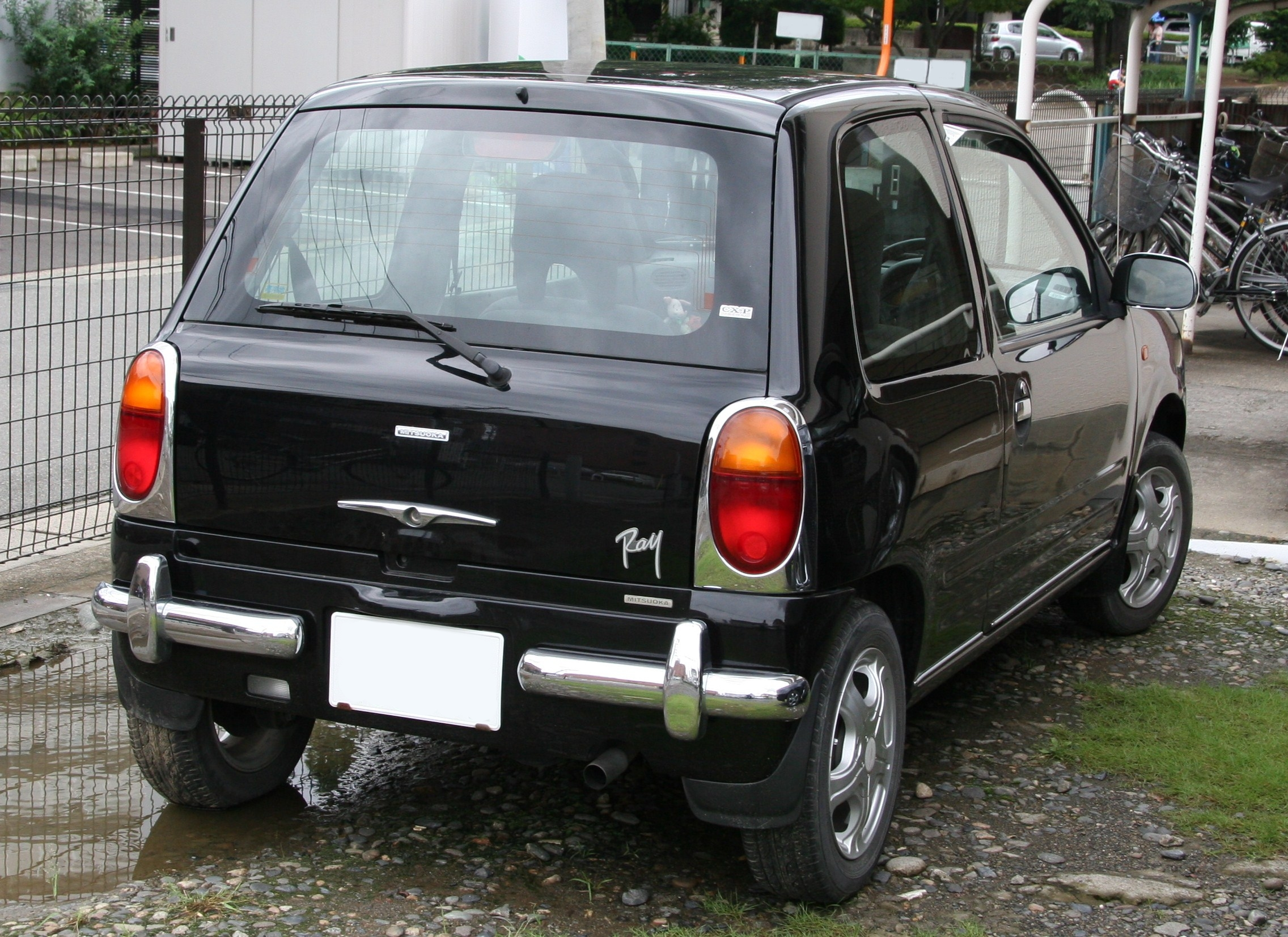
Rear view of the 1st generation Mitsuoka Ray

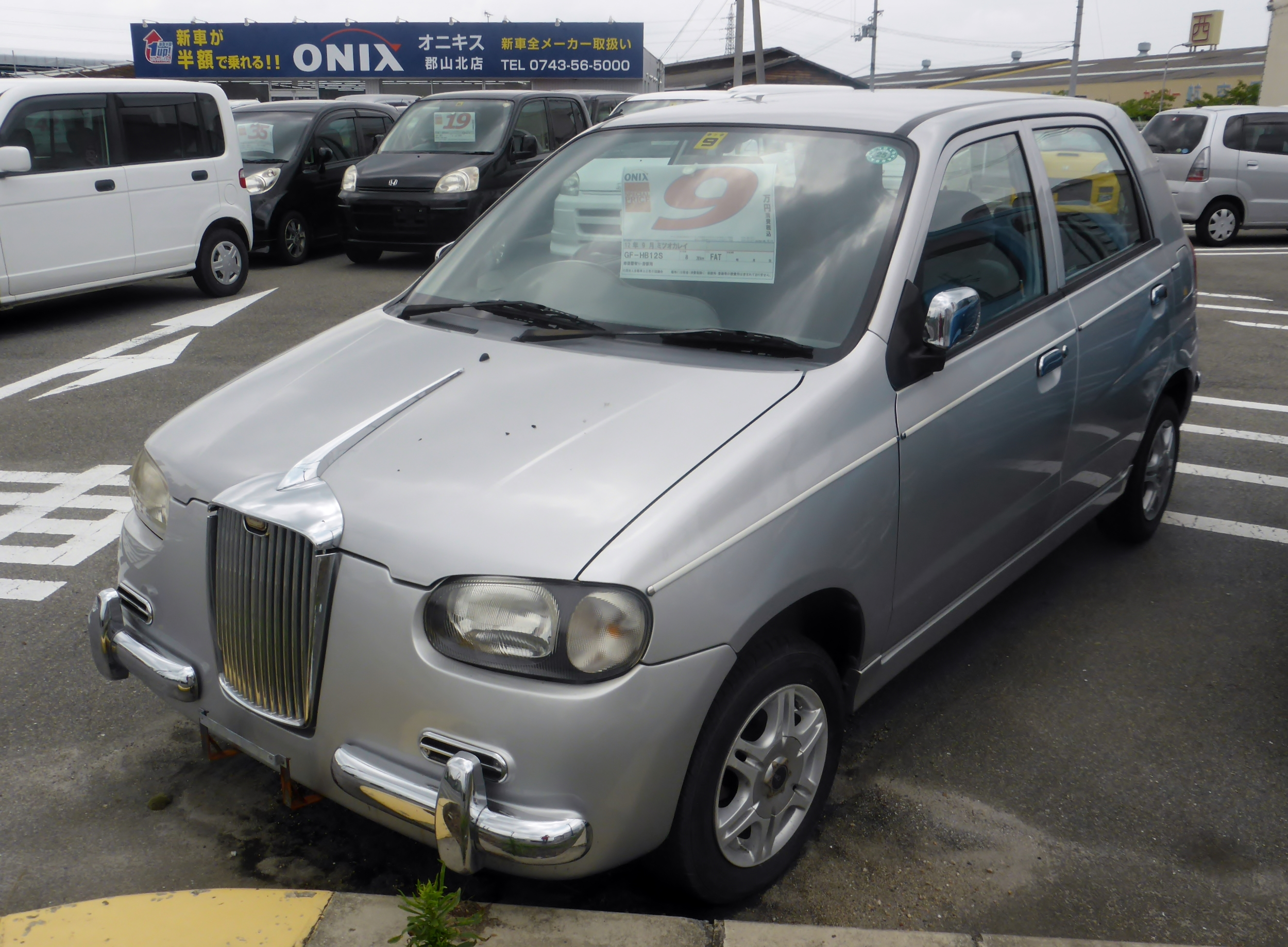
2nd generation Mitsuoka Ray

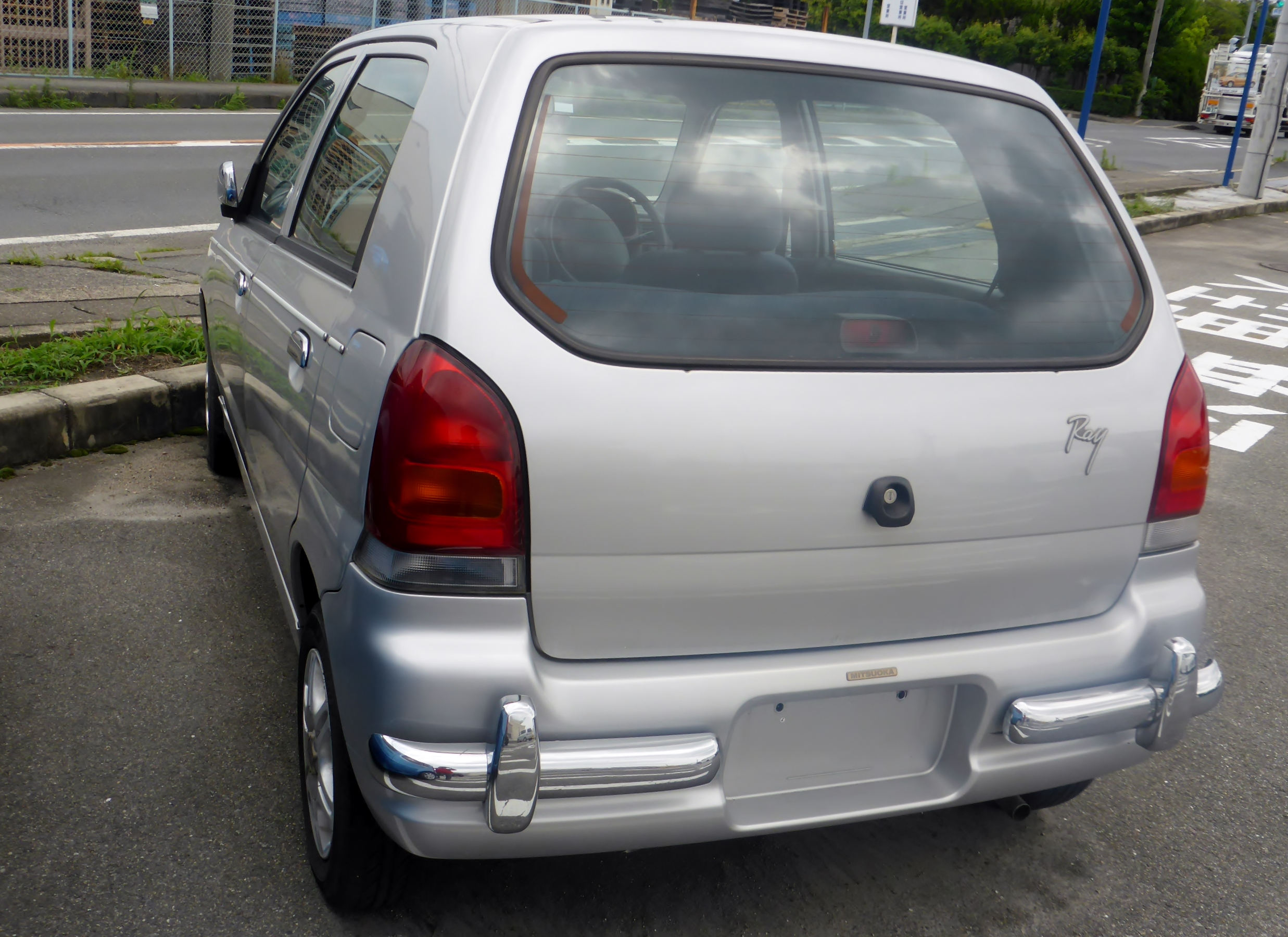
Rear view of the 2nd generation Mitsuoka Ray
