= Mitsuoka Nouera =

- 2004 Mitsuoka Nouera

Overview
- Manufacturer: Mitsuoka
- Production: 2004–2012

Body and chassis
- Class: Executive car
- Body style: 4-door sedan; 5-door wagon (2008–2012)
- Layout: Front-engine, front-wheel-drive; Front-engine, four-wheel-drive
- Related: Honda Accord; Toyota Corolla (E140)

Chronology
- Successor: Mitsuoka Ryugi

The Mitsuoka Nouera (光岡・ヌエラ, Mitsuoka Nuera) is a mid size saloon from the Japanese car brand Mitsuoka. The Nouera is a 4-door saloon model and 5-door wagon model available in second generation. Initially based on the Honda Accord and laterly Toyota Corolla (E140). The Nouera comes from the English phrase "New Era".

== First generation (CL; 2004) ==
Mitsuoka Nouera
- 2004 Mitsuoka Nouera

Overview
- Manufacturer: Mitsuoka
- Production: 2004–2008

Body and chassis
- Body style: 4-door sedan
- Layout: Front engine, front-wheel drive; Front engine, four-wheel drive
- Related: Honda Accord (seventh generation)

Powertrain
- Engine: 2.0L K20A6 I4 (20ST, 20LX); 2.4L K24A2 I4 (24LX)
- Transmission: 5-speed automatic

Dimensions
- Wheelbase: 2,670 mm (105.1 in)
- Length: 4,860 mm (191.3 in)
- Width: 1,760 mm (69.3 in)
- Height: 1,760 mm (69.3 in)
- Curb weight: 1,390–1,470 kg (3,060–3,240 lb)

Rear View

The first generation Nouera was unveiled at the 2003 Tokyo Motor Show, and launched in April 2004. The first-generation based on the Honda Accord. The front and rear styling is modified: a chrome grille and twin circular headlamps have been added at the front to give the car classic English looks, and differently shaped rear lights have been used. The interior is similar to the Accord's, with wood trim and leather seats available. There are 3 models: 20ST, 20LX, 24LX.

Both 20ST and 20LX have 4WD or FWD, with a 2.0L DOHC i-VTEC engine (152 or 155eHP). The 24LX model has only FWD with the 2.4L DOHC i-VTEC engine (200eHP). The 24LX has 16-inch rims, where the 20ST/LX has 15-inch as standard. Length of both models is 4860 mm. Wheelbase is 2670 mm.

The Nouera was of a similar size to the larger Galue and the smaller Ryoga, and seems to provide an alternative to both models.

== Second generation (E140; 2008) ==
Mitsuoka Nouera 6-02

Overview
- Manufacturer: Mitsuoka
- Production: August 2008–May 2012

Body and chassis
- Body style: 4-door sedan; 5-door wagon
- Layout: Front engine, front-wheel drive; Front engine, four-wheel drive
- Related: Toyota Corolla (E140)

Powertrain
- Engine: 1.5 L 1NZ-FE I4; 1.8 L 2ZR-FE I4
- Transmission: 5-speed automatic; CVT

The second generation Nouera was released in May 2008. The Nouera available in 3 grades: 15ST, 15LX, 18LX, each grades available in booth Front-wheel drive and Four wheel drive drivetrains.

The second generation Nouera identical to the first-generation, but the taillights was replaced and similar to those of the Galue.
