= Mitsuoka MC-1 =

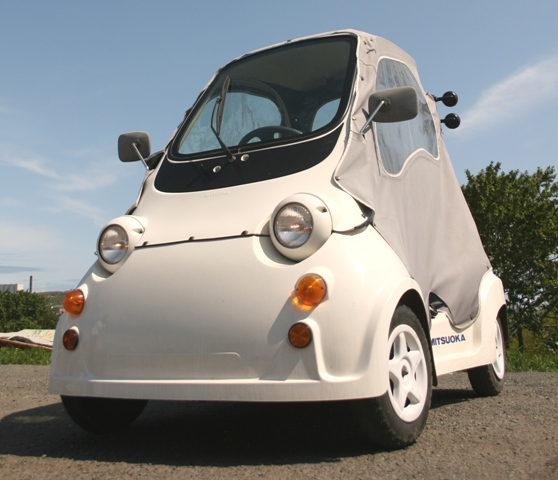

Overview
- Manufacturer: Mitsuoka
- Also called: Mitsuoka MC-1 EV
- Model years: 1998-2007

Body and chassis
- Class: Microcar
- Layout: Mid-engine
- Related: MC-1 EV

Powertrain
- Engine: 50 cc 1 cylinder
- Transmission: CVT

Dimensions
- Length: 1,755 mm (69.1 in)
- Width: 1,080 mm (42.5 in)
- Height: 1,470 mm (57.9 in)
- Curb weight: 160 kg (352.7 lb)< 170 kg (374.8 lb)(T Variant)

Chronology
- Successor: Mitsuoka K-2

The Mitsuoka MC-1 is a microcar produced by the Japanese company Mitsuoka. It has a top speed of 50 km/h (31 mph) and a 6 hp (4 kW) engine. It lacks many items a normal car would have, (i.e. radio, airbags and GPS). When the MC-1 first went on sale, it had a base price of 385,000 yen. By 2005, the price had become 488,250 yen. For the 2005 model year, the engine was shrunk by 1 cc to a 49 cc engine.

== Variants ==
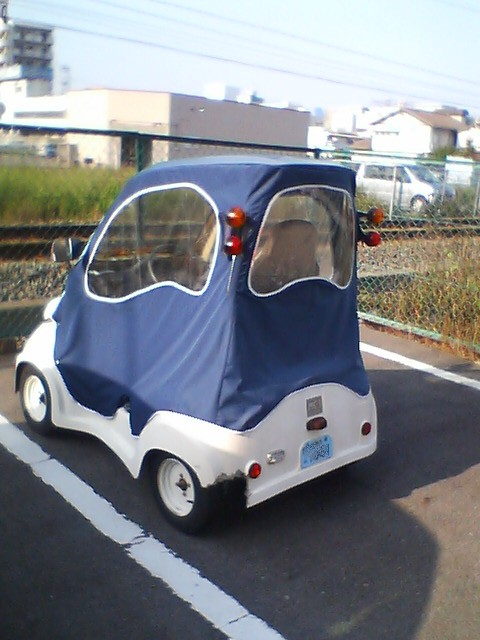
MC-1 Rear

MC-1 T
There was also a larger T variant that is 10 kg (22 lb) heavier than the standard MC-1. There is a delivery box mount and a luggage bed. The mechanicals were the same as the MC-1.
MC-1 EV
The EV version powered by a DC electric motor which produces 0.59 kilowatts (0.8 hp) of power. There are three different motors each with a different wattage: 72V, 48V, and 12V motors.

== Design ==
Mitsuoka wanted to make the MC-1 easy to take care of. There is even an owner's manual on Mitsuoka's website. The interior is simple, a large speedometer with some sensors, gear shifting stick, steering wheel and a seat. The body is mostly plastic. The 'doors' are fabric. For 2004, the MC-1 was slightly redesigned by adding a slit under the headlights.

== Safety ==
The MC-1 is extremely unsafe as most of the car is plastic and fabric. It has no airbags, but it does have a 3-point seatbelt.

== Marketing ==
It was marketed under the slogan, 'Microcar for your life.'
