= Masami Mitsuoka =

Japanese pop singer (born 1986)

Masami Mitsuoka (光岡昌美)
- Also known as: MASAMI, Mizca
- Born: 光岡昌美 (Mitsuoka Masami); August 14, 1986 (age 40); Toyota, Aichi, Japan
- Origin: Aichi Prefecture, Japan
- Genres: Pop, electropop
- Occupation: Singer
- Years active: 2005–2013, 2014-2015
- Labels: Toshiba-EMI (2005–2006); Pony Canyon (2007–2009); Nippon Crown (2009–2011); Sound Move (Smile Company Ltd.) (2011-2013); Jam Records (2014)
- Website: http://www.mitsuokamasami.com

Masami Mitsuoka (光岡昌美, Mitsuoka Masami; born August 14, 1986) is a Japanese pop singer. Born and raised in Toyota, Aichi, Mitsuoka debuted in the girl group Sister Q under the stage name MASAMI in 2005. After the group disbanded of unknown reasons in October 2006, she signed a contract with Pony Canyon and released her debut solo single "Hana" in 2007 under her real name.

Mitsuoka's fourth single "Last Cross", the theme song for Katekyō Hitman Reborn!, was released on December 17, 2008, and charted at number thirteen on the Oricon weekly charts. It became her best selling single with a total of 13,470 copies sold. Her first studio album, Black Diary, was released on January 28, 2009. In August 2009, she announced on her official website and blog that she will be changing her stage name, music style, and record label. Mitsuoka thus became known under the stage name Mizca and began releasing electropop music under the label Nippon Crown. Now produced by pal@pop, Mizca released her first digital single "Robotics" was on October 28, 2009. Her first studio album as Mizca, UFUFU, was released on July 21, 2010.

Mitsuoka went back to her previous name and music style in 2011, and released her second album PAST TRUNK on January 11, 2012, her first studio album as Masami Mitsuoka in three years.

== Discography ==
=== Studio albums ===
List of albums, with selected chart positions and sales figures
Title	Album details	Peak chart positions	Sales
Title	Album details	JPN	Sales
Black Diary	As: Masami Mitsuoka; Released: January 28, 2009; Label: Pony Canyon; Format: CD, digital download	114	1,407
UFUFU	As: Mizca; Released: July 21, 2010; Label: Nippon Crown; Format: CD, digital download	202	651
PAST TRUNK	As: Masami Mitsuoka; Released: January 11, 2012; Label: Sound Move; Format: CD, digital download	—	—
"—" denotes releases that did not chart or were not released in that region. "*" denotes that the album still charts but the position is yet to be mentioned.

=== Singles ===
List of singles, with selected chart positions and sales
Title	Year	Peak chart positions	Sales	Album
Title	Year	JPN	Sales	Album
"Hana"	2007	119	876	Black Diary
"Distance Love/I am"	2008	110	788	Black Diary
"届かない想い...～ロードanotherstory～"	2008	106	798	Black Diary
"last cross"	2008	13	13,470	Black Diary
"FREE BIRD"	2009	127	641	Black Diary
"キラキラ☆"	2010	100	660	UFUFU
"ダメよ♡"	2010	140	466	UFUFU
"1925"	2011	146	371	Non-album single
"らふぃおら"	2011	194	274	Non-album single
"—" denotes releases that did not chart or were not released.

=== Digital releases ===
Title	Year	Album
"Robotics"	2009	UFUFU
"星のつぶつぶ"	2010	Non-album single
"OUT of STEP"	2011	PAST TRUNK
"LOVE BRACE"	2012	Non-album single
