= Mitsuoka =

Japanese automobile company

Mitsuoka Motor Co., Ltd.
- Type: Private company
- Industry: Automobile manufacturing
- Founded: 1 February 1968; 58 years ago
- Headquarters: 508-3, Kakeomachi, Toyama City, Toyama Prefecture, Japan
- Key people: Akio Mitsuoka (Executive Chairman); Mitsugu Ono (President & CEO)
- Products: Automobiles, Luxury vehicles
- Revenue: ¥227,000,000
- Net income: ¥29,700,000,000
- Number of employees: 580 (As of March, 2008)
- Website: mitsuoka-motor.com

Mitsuoka Motor (光岡自動車) is a small Japanese automobile company. It is noted for building cars with unconventional styling, some of which are modern while most others are retro-styled to imitate the look of American, European and particularly British cars of the 1950s and 1960s. Mitsuoka Motors is also the principal distributor of the retro-classic TD2000 roadster in Japan.

Mitsuoka is primarily a custom design coachbuilder, customizing production cars, e.g., the Nissan March, and replacing various aspects of the bodywork. It has also produced a sports car, the Orochi, and has a special department for hearses.

== History ==
Mitsuoka was recognised in 1994 as the 10th Japanese auto manufacturer to be registered in Japan since Honda in 1963, basing its current cars on Nissans and other Japanese car manufacturers.

Mitsuoka Motor launched in the UK in 2015 under sole distribution of T W White & Sons and launched the Mitsuoka Roadster (Himiko) at the London Motor Show in 2016.

The M55 is a Showa retro concept car created for Mitsuoka's 55th anniversary. The appearance of the car is intended to resemble that of cars from 1970s Japan. The car has been said to resemble 1970s models of the Datsun B110, the Mitsubishi Galant GTO, the Nissan Skyline and the Toyota Celica. North American commenters have felt that it resembles the Dodge Challenger, but it is said to have actually been inspired by the Kenmeri Skyline.

== Models ==
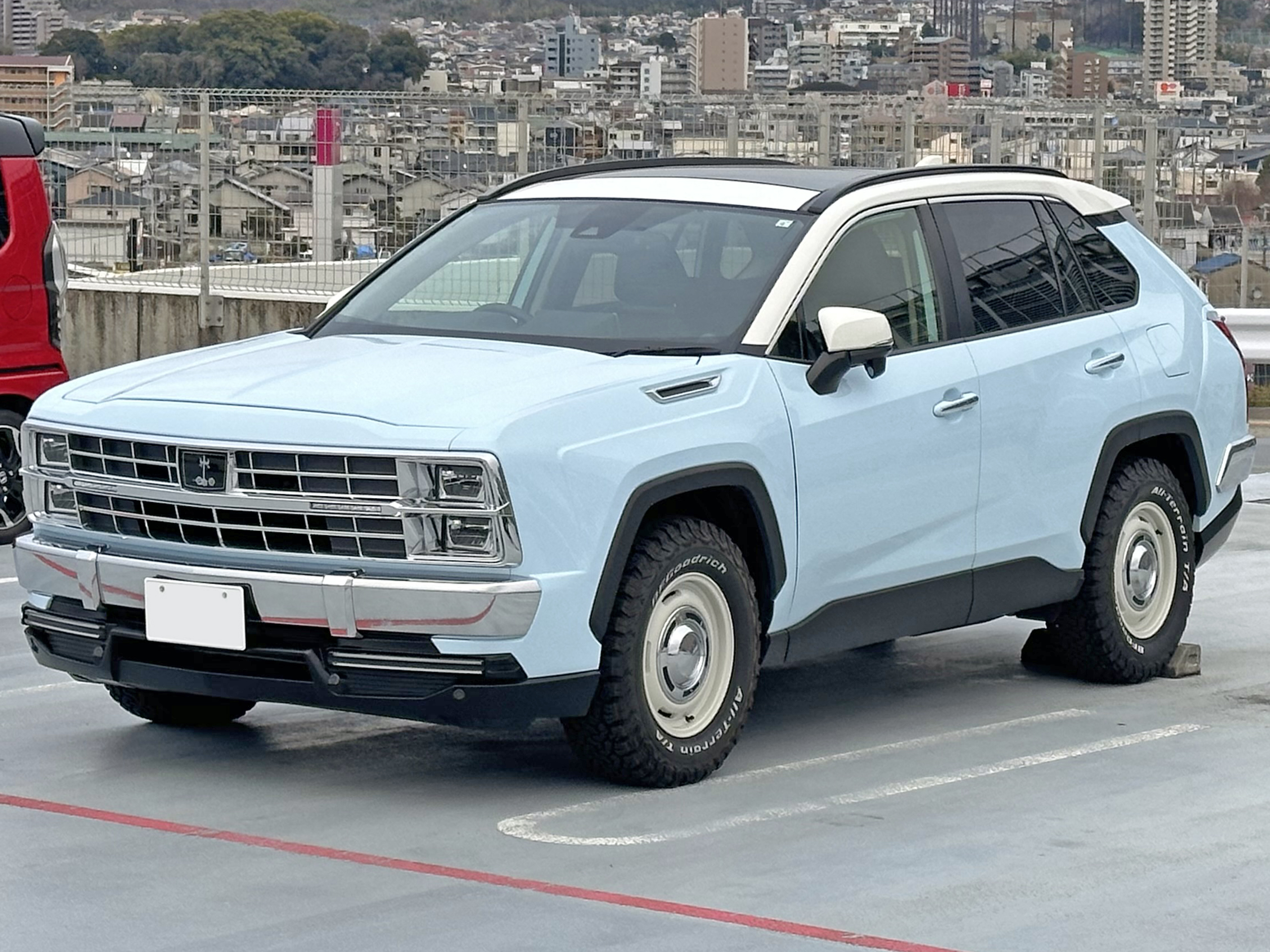
Mitsuoka Buddy

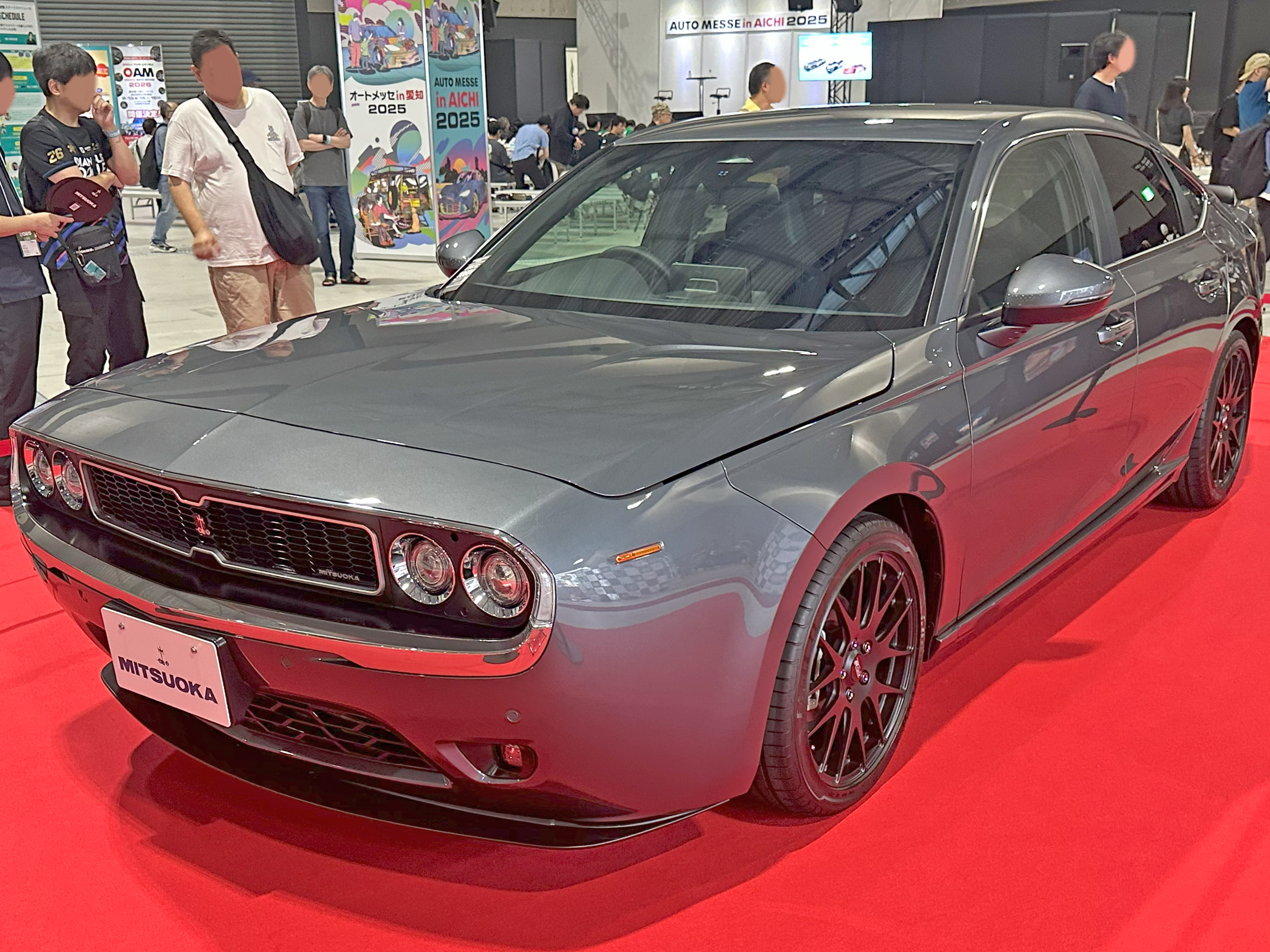
Mitsuoka M55 Zero Edition

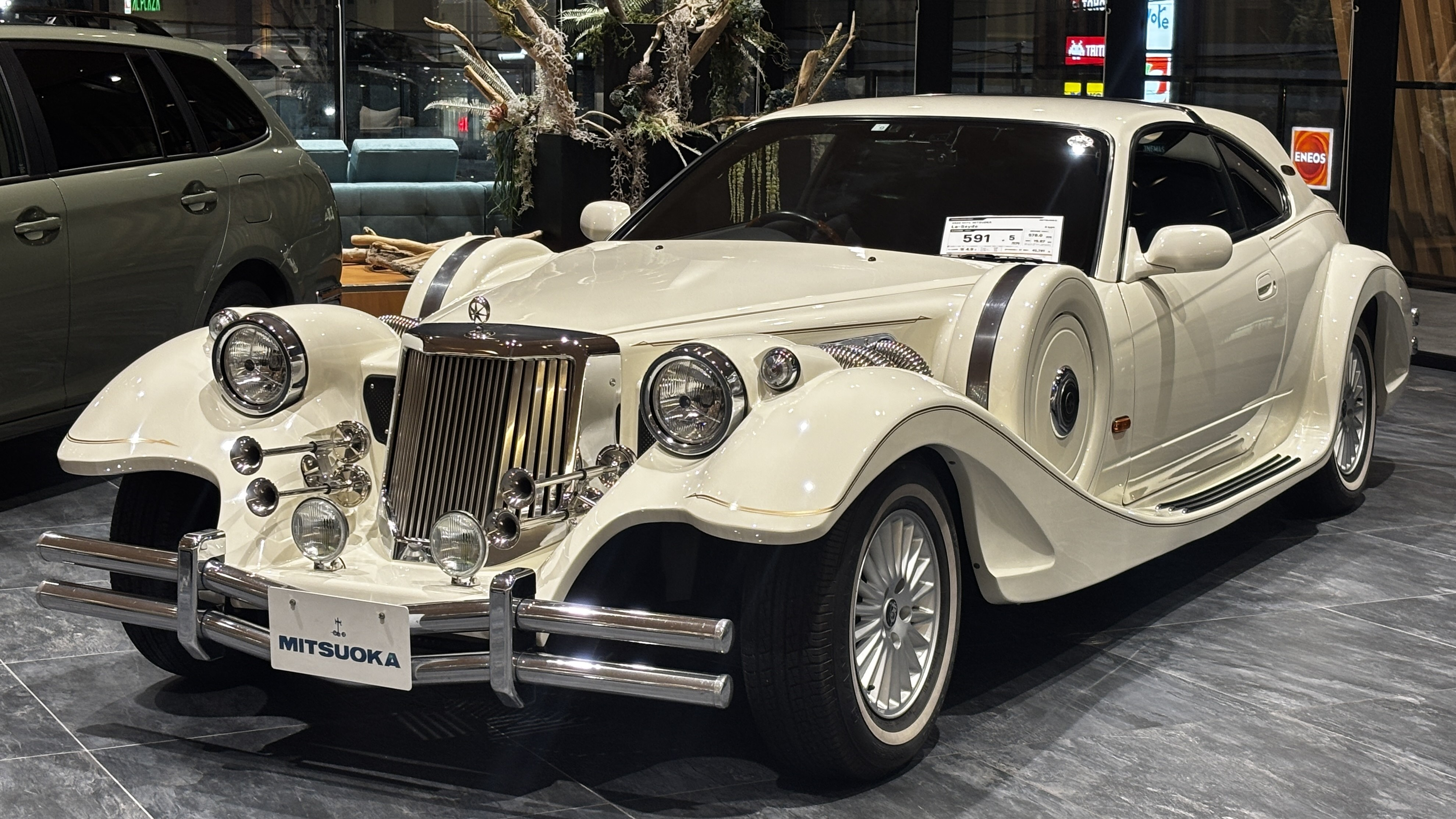
2000 Mitsuoka Le-Seyde

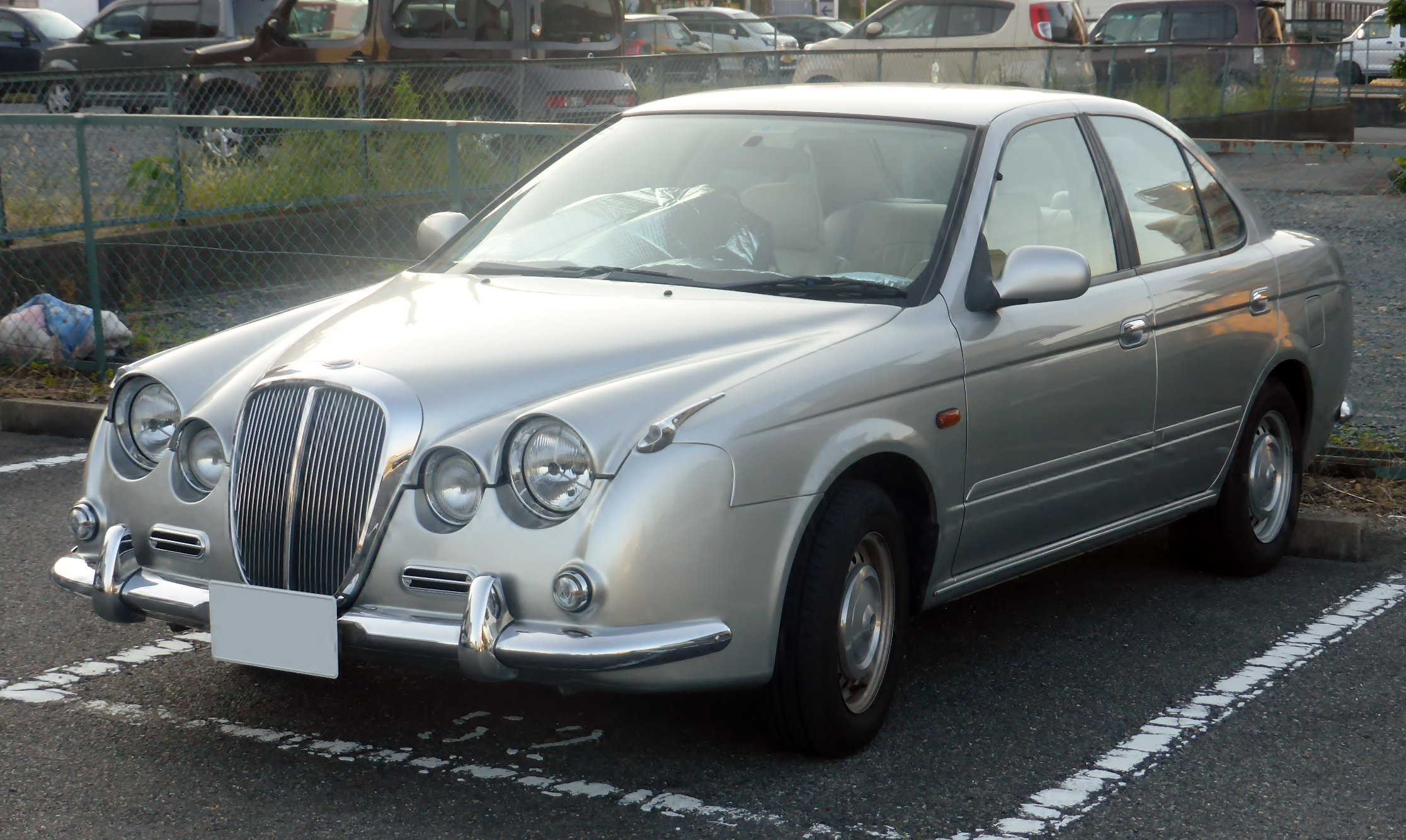
Second generation Ryoga

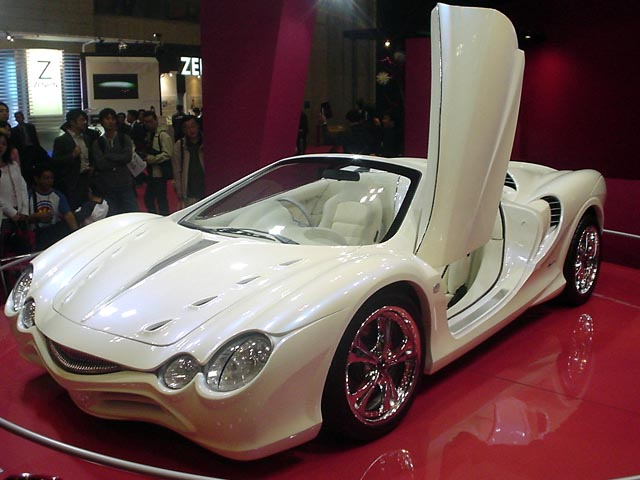
2005 Mitsuoka Orochi Nude-Top Roadster

=== Current lineup ===
- 1993–present Viewt
- 1996–present Galue
- 2008–present Himiko/Roadster
- 2021–present Buddy (K5 Blazer inspiration, based on the Toyota RAV4)
- 2025–present M55 (Kenmeri Skyline inspiration, based on the Honda Civic (eleventh generation))

=== Past vehicles ===
- 1982 BUBU 50 Series
  - 1982 BUBU 501 (a three-wheeled microcar)
  - 1985 BUBU 505-C (a Morgan 4/4 inspiration)
- 1987–1989 BUBU Classic SSK (replica of the Mercedes-Benz SSK roadster based on the Volkswagen Beetle)
- 1989–1990 BUBU 356 Speedstar (a replica of the Porsche 356 Speedster)
- 1990–1993, 2000–2001 Le-Seyde (a Nissan Silvia-based coupé inspired by Zimmer)
- 1991–1993 Dore (similar to the Le-Seyde, based on the Nissan Silvia S13)
- 1994–2000 Zero1 (a Lotus Super Seven replica with Eunos Roadster drivetrain)
- 1996–2000 Type F (a restyled Zero1)
- 1996–2004 Ray (styling similar to the Riley Elf Mk.3, based on the Mazda Carol and later the Daihatsu Mira Gino)
- 1998–2004 Ryoga a "classically" styled sedan originally based on the Primera and later on the smaller Sunny
- 1998–2007 Mitsuoka Microcar
  - 1998–2007 Microcar K-1/MC-1
    - 1999–2007 MC-1T
  - 1998–? Microcar K-2 (based on the design of the FMR Tg500)
  - 2005–? Microcar K-3/Type F (design similar to the Zero1)
  - 2006–? Microcar K-4/Type R (styling reminiscent of 1950s race cars)
  - 1999–2007 ME-1
  - 2002–2007 ME-2 (Convoy 88)
- 2000–2001 Yuga (a London Taxi replica based on the Nissan Cube)
- 2004–2012 Nouera (based on the Honda Accord and later the Toyota Corolla)
- 2007–2014 Orochi (based on the Honda NSX)
- 2008–2012 Galue 204 (based on the Toyota Corolla Axio)
- 2010–2012 Galue Classic (based on the Toyota Corolla Axio)
- 2010–2012 Like (based on the Mitsubishi i-MiEV)
- 2012–2022 Like-T3
- 2018–2022 Rock Star (C2 Corvette inspiration, based on the Mazda MX-5)
- 2014–2026 Mitsuoka Ryugi (based on the Toyota Corolla Axio and Toyota Corolla Fielder)
