= Mitsuoka Le-Seyde =

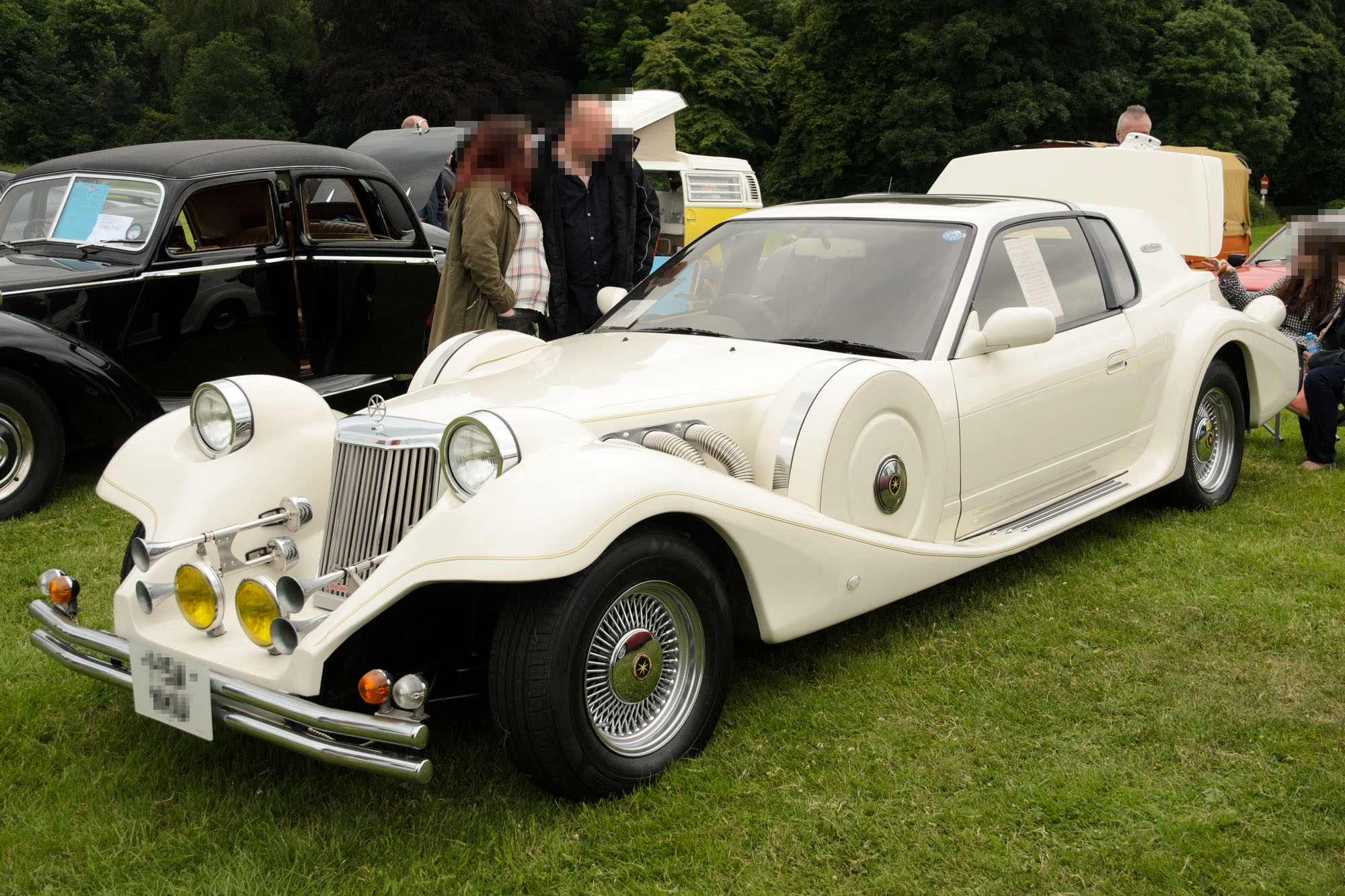
- Mitsuoka Le-Seyde

Overview
- Manufacturer: Mitsuoka
- Production: May 1990–1993 (Le-Seyde); July 1991–July 1993 (Dore); November 2000–2006 (New Le-Seyde)
- Assembly: Japan

Body and chassis
- Class: Grand Tourer
- Body style: 2-door coupé 2-door convertible (Dore)
- Layout: FMR layout

Powertrain
- Engine: 1.8 L CA18DE I4 (Le-Seyde); 2.0 L SR20DE I4 (New Le-Seyde); 4.9 L Windsor V8 (Dore)
- Transmission: 4-speed automatic

Dimensions
- Wheelbase: 3,375 mm (132.9 in) (Le-Seyde); 3,425 mm (134.8 in) (New Le-Seyde)
- Length: 5,100 mm (200.8 in) (Le-Seyde); 5,230 mm (205.9 in) (New Le-Seyde)
- Width: 1,870 mm (73.6 in) (Le-Seyde); 1,880 mm (74.0 in) (New Le-Seyde)
- Height: 1,280 mm (50.4 in) (Le-Seyde); 1,270 mm (50.0 in) (New Le-Seyde)
- Curb weight: 1,352 kg (2,980.6 lb) (New Le-Seyde)

The Mitsuoka Le-Seyde is a limited production Grand Tourer manufactured in the early 1990s, based on the Nissan Silvia S13. Only 500 units were made, and Mitsuoka claims that all were sold within four days after they went on sale.

The Le-Seyde is considered a neoclassic car, featuring a retro design inspired by cars of the 1920s and 1930s. The Le Seyde features a similar design to other neoclassic cars of the 1990s made by companies such as Zimmer and Excalibur.

The Le-Seyde was designed at Nissan's Kyushu plant, where the design for the centre portion and interior was based on the Silvia S13. The engine used is the same naturally aspirated 1.8 L (1,809 cc) CA18DE engine used in the Silvia S13 up until mid-1990.

== Dore ==
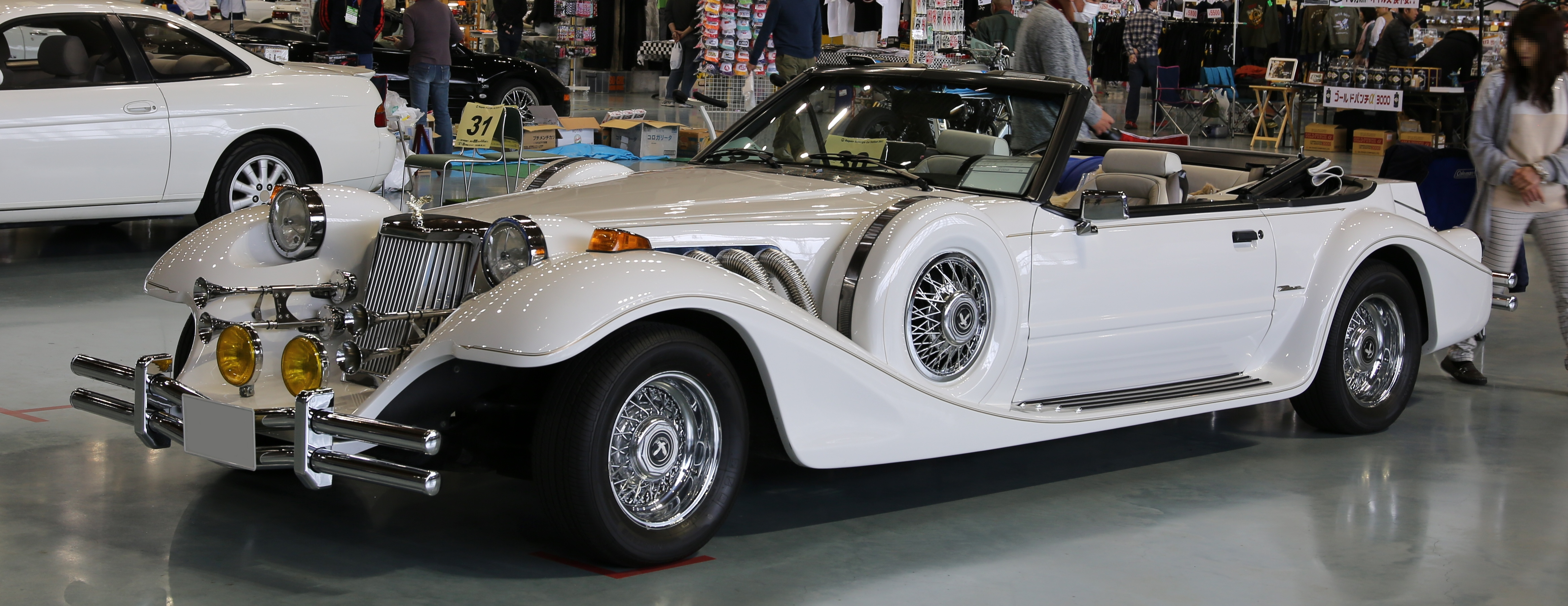
Mitsuoka Dore (front)

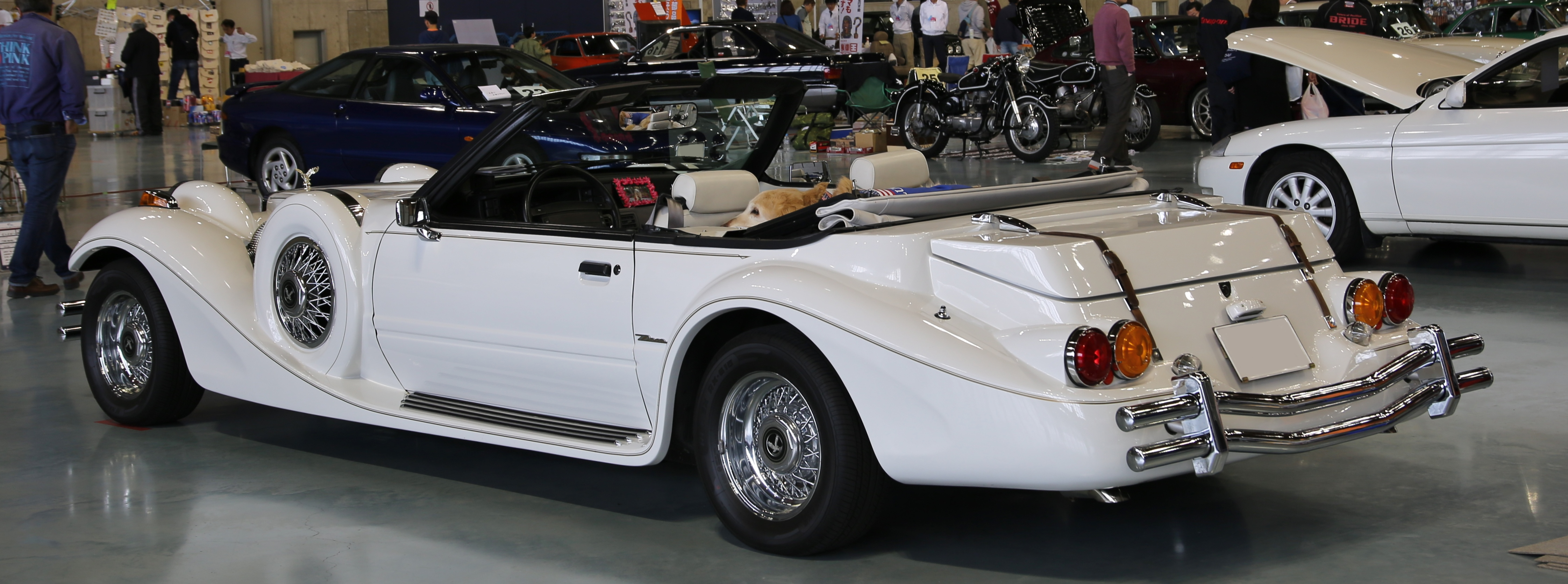
Mitsuoka Dore (rear)

The Dore is a convertible version of the Le-Seyde produced in July 1991 as a limited production model based on the 1979-1993 Ford Mustang Fox body.

Compared to the Le-Seyde, the centre portion and interior of the Dore was similar to that of the Fox body Mustang. The engine used is the same naturally aspirated 302 cu in (4.9 L) "5.0" small-block (Windsor) V8 engine as used on the Mustang. The Dore also retained its left-hand drive configuration from the Mustang as opposed to using the right-hand drive configuration found in many cars in Japan.

== New Le-Seyde ==
A redesigned version of the Le-Seyde (also known as the New Le-Seyde) was introduced in late 2000, and was based on the Nissan Silvia S15. it is identical to the original Le-Seyde with only a few minor cosmetic changes, mostly in regards to the centre portion and interior, which are similar to the Silvia S15.

The engine used is the same naturally aspirated 2.0 L (1,998 cc) SR20DE engine used in the Silvia S15.

== In popular culture ==
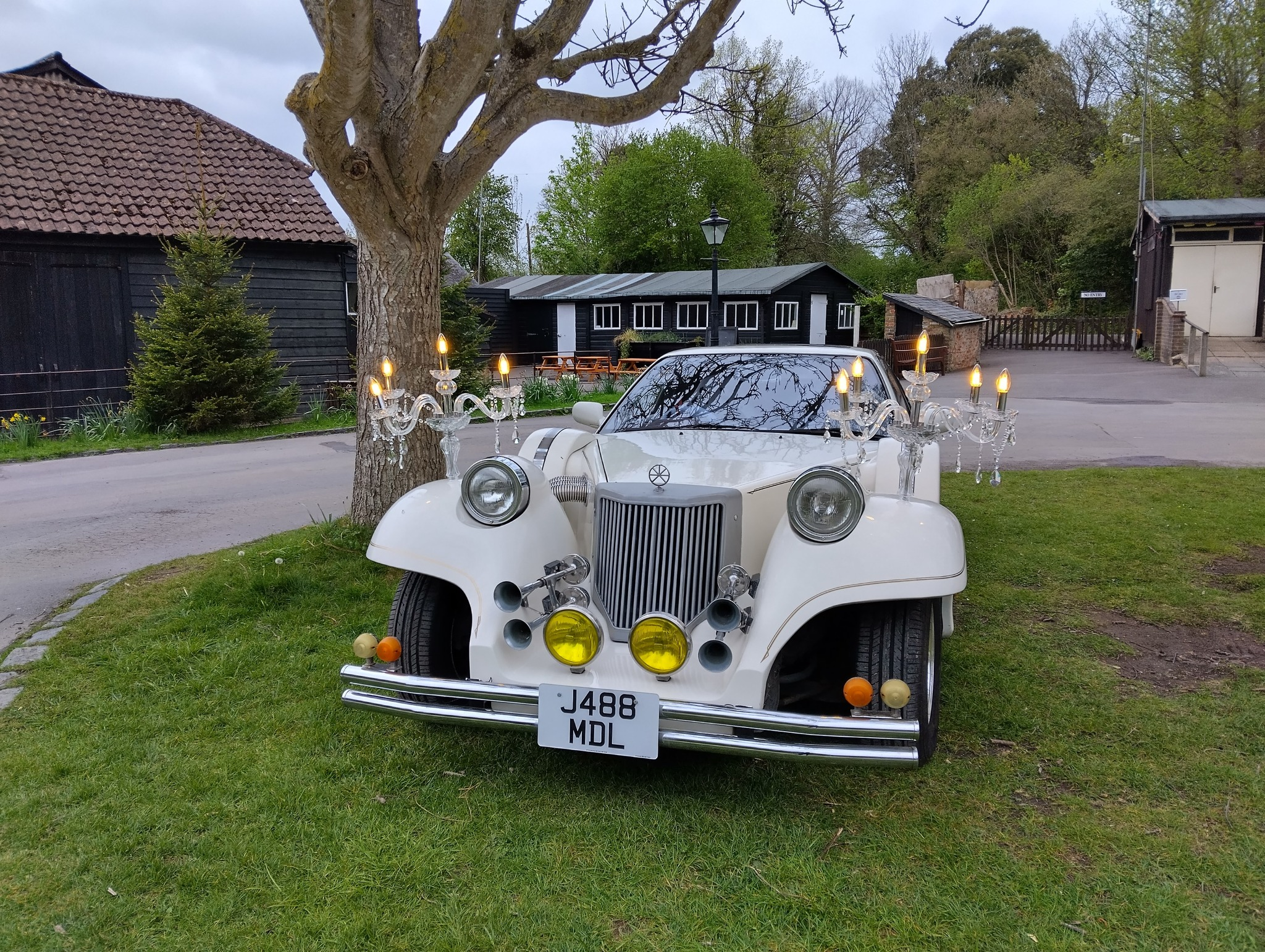
Jeremy Clarkson's Mitsuoka Le-Seyde from The Grand Tour special "Eurocrash"

The Le-Seyde gained some attention when it was featured in the popular British motoring television series The Grand Tour in a special episode titled "Eurocrash", which premiered on 16 June 2023. This episode followed Jeremy Clarkson and his co-presenters, Richard Hammond and James May, as they embarked on a journey for a road trip through Central Europe starting in Gdańsk, Poland, and traveling through Slovakia, Hungary, and Slovenia, using unusual and obscure vehicles. Clarkson selected the Le-Seyde as his vehicle of choice in the episode.
