= Mitsuoka Galue =

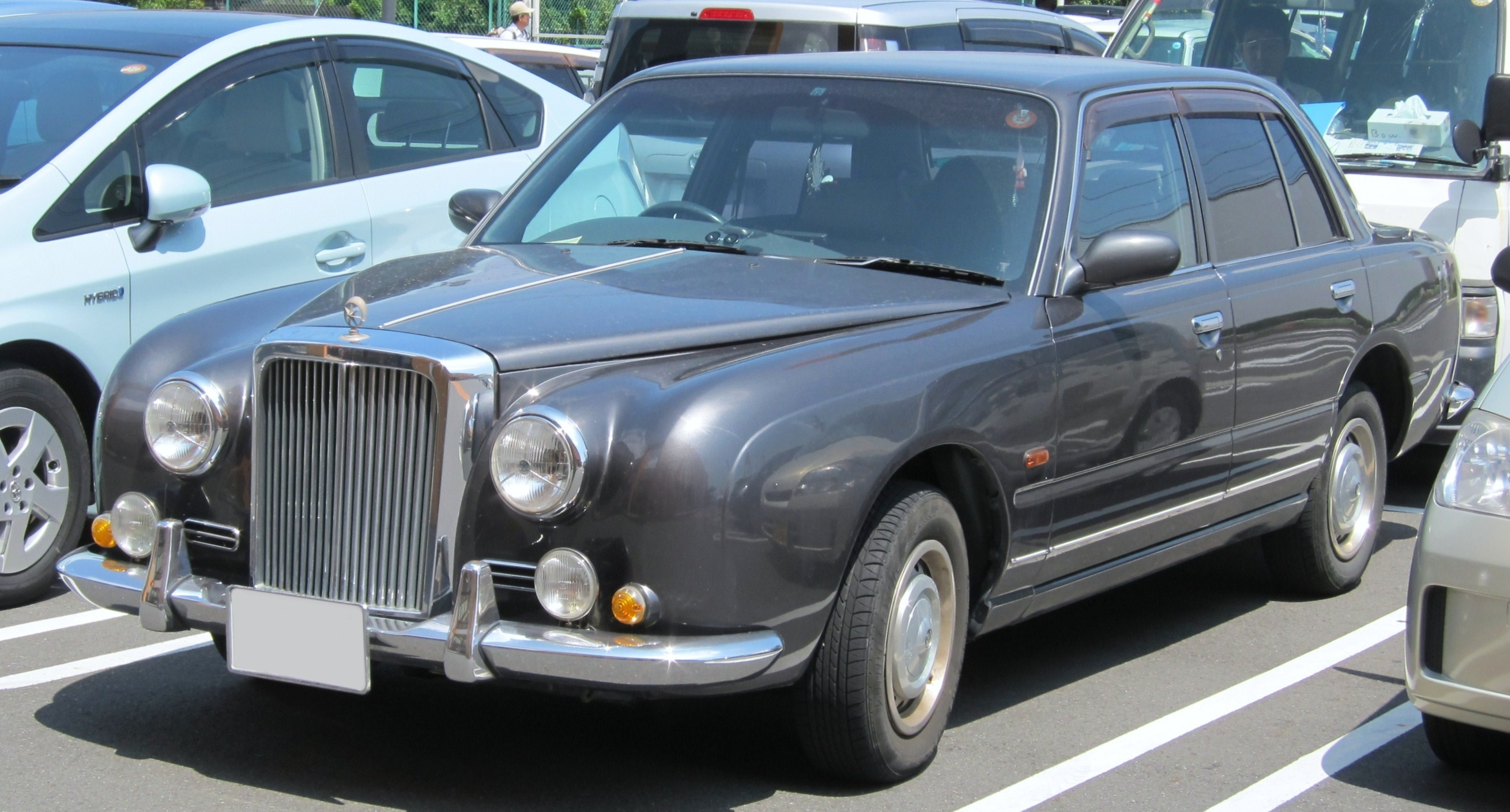
- A Mk I Galue

Overview
- Manufacturer: Mitsuoka
- Production: 1996–present

Body and chassis
- Class: Full-size luxury car
- Body style: 4-door sedan 2-door convertible
- Layout: FR (Galue-I, II, III and Galue Convertible); F4 (Galue Limousine S50, Galue Gen.4); FF (Galue 204, Galue Gen.4 & 5)
- Related: Nissan Crew (Galue-I); Nissan Cedric Y34 (Galue-II); Nissan Fuga (Y50) (Galue-III); Ford Mustang (Galue Convertible); Toyota Corolla Axio (Galue 204 / Galue Classic); Nissan Teana J32 (Galue Gen.4); Nissan Teana L33 (Galue Gen.5)

Powertrain
- Engine: 2.0L Nissan RB20E I6 (Galue I); 2.5L Nissan VQ25DD V6 (Galue II); 3.0L Nissan VQ30DD V6 (Galue II); 2.5L Nissan VQ25HR V6 (Galue III); 3.5L Nissan VQ35HR V6 (Galue III, Galue Gen.4); 4.0L Ford Cologne V6 (Galue Convertible); 3.7L Ford Duratec 37 V6 (Galue Convertible); 4.6L Ford Modular V8 (Galue Convertible); 5.0L Ford Coyote V8 (Galue Convertible); 1.5L Toyota 1NZ-FE I4 (Galue 204); 1.8L Toyota 2ZR-FAE I4 (Galue 204); 2.5L Nissan QR25DE I4 (Galue 4 & 5)
- Transmission: 5-speed manual (Galue 204); 4-speed automatic (Galue I, Galue II); 5-speed automatic (Galue III); 6-speed automatic (Galue Convertible); 7-speed manumatic (Galue 204); Super CVT-i (Galue 204); Nissan XTRONIC CVT (Galue 4 & 5)

The Mitsuoka Galue is a series of luxury cars, based on mainstream Japanese automobiles, customized by Mitsuoka to resemble classic British and American cars.

== First series ==
The first series consists of three generations of medium-to-large cars: the Galue-I, the Galue-II and the Galue-III.

=== Galue-I ===
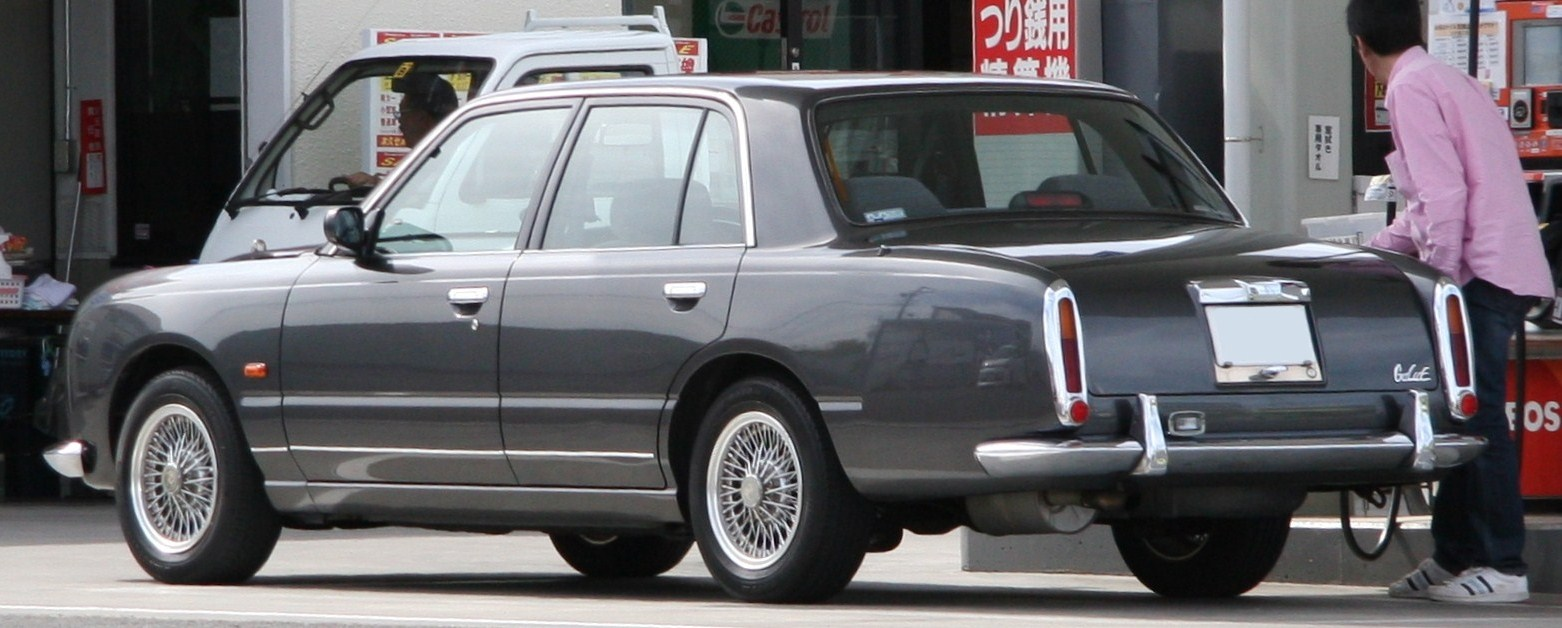
Galue-I rear.

Galue-I Interior.

The Galue-I was based on the Nissan Crew, and shared its RB20E 2-litre engine and other mechanical parts with the Crew. The styling of the front and rear was changed to give a more classical appearance; specifically, the chrome grille resembled that found on Bentley models such as the R-type. The rear lights were taken from the Cadillac Fleetwood (Japan-Spec because of the amber indicator lens). The interior was fitted with leather seats and wood trim. Additions such as chrome on the door handles and wire wheels were also available. The Galue-I was made from 1996 to 1999 as the Galue, then when the Galue-II was introduced the name was changed to Galue-I and production continued until 2001.

=== Galue-II ===
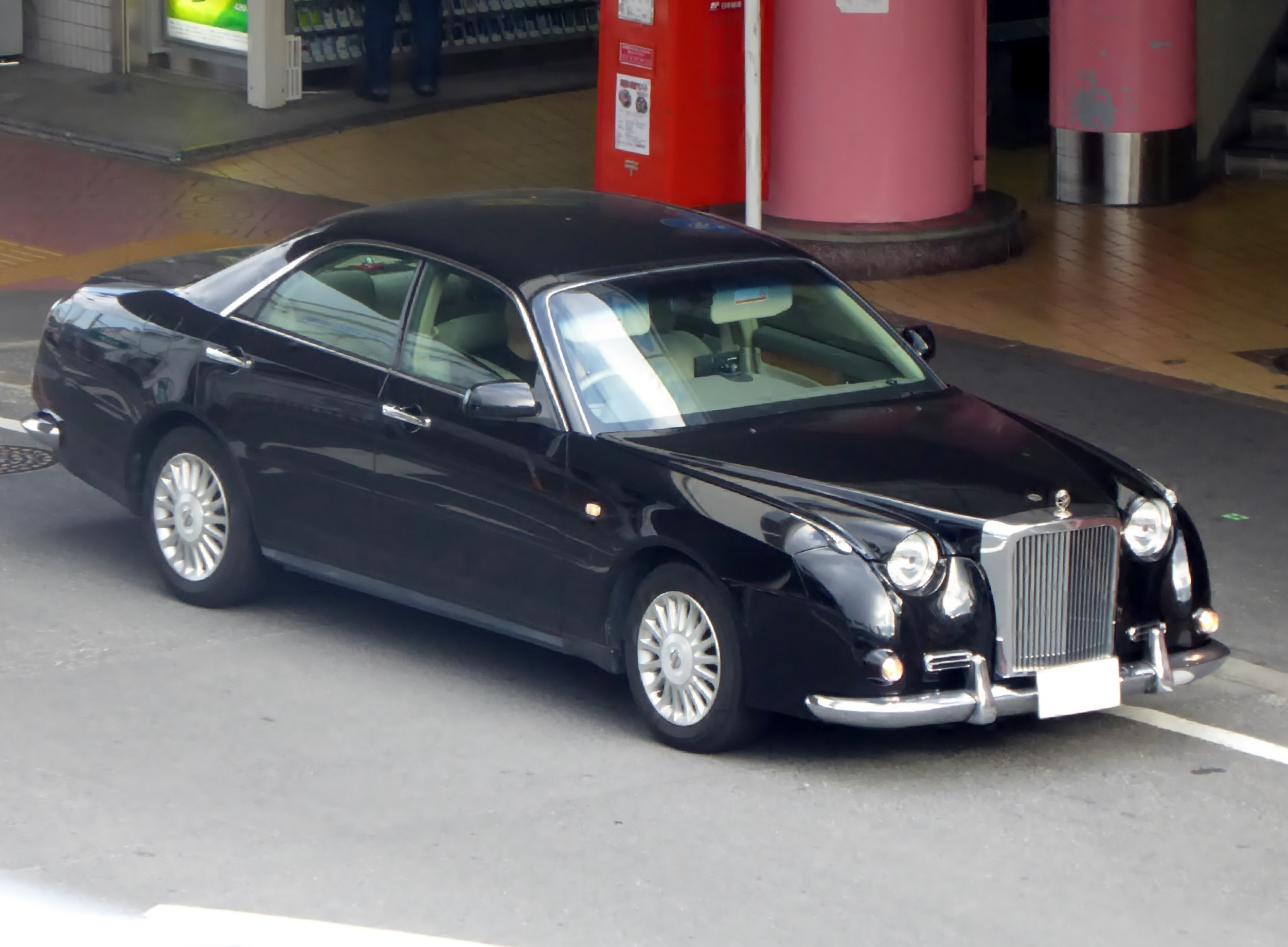
Mitsuoka Galue-II

The Galue-II was based on the Nissan Cedric Y34 and Gloria Y34 hardtops. (The Cedric and Gloria were very similar in styling and mechanicals). Once again, the front and rear styling was modified, and the interior fittings upgraded. The Galue-II's styling was more extrovert than that of the Galue-I, including spoked alloy wheels instead of the disc wheels or wire wheels found on the Galue-I; this may well have been necessary to harmonise with the styling of the Cedric hardtop. The mechanicals were taken from the Cedric; 2.5-litre and 3-litre V6 VQ-series petrol engines were offered. Production ran from 1999 to 2005, when the Cedric and Gloria were replaced by the Fuga; Mitsuoka then replaced the Galue-II with the Galue-III.

=== Galue-III ===
The Galue-III, initially sold simply as the Mitsuoka Galue, was based on the Nissan Fuga Y50, with styling once again modified to suit the new lines. The bumpers were noticeably slimmer than they had been on the Galue-II and the grille surround was thicker, making a considerable difference to the appearance of the front of the car. The interior was upgraded, though since the standard Nissan now had a comparatively luxurious interior the effect of Mitsuoka's modification was less easy to see. 2.5-litre and 3.5-litre VQ-series engines from the Fuga were used. The model was produced from 2005, from February 2008 as the Galue-III.

=== Galue Convertible ===
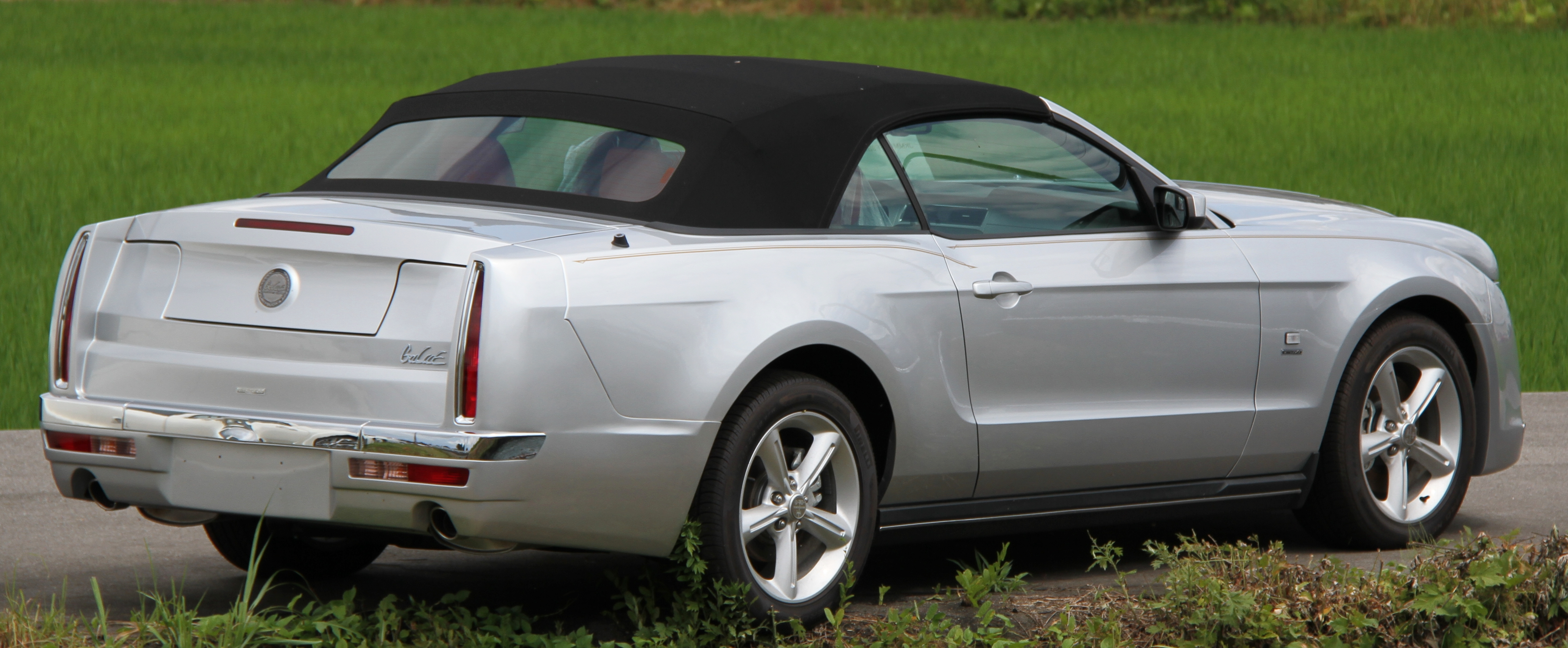
Mitsuoka Galue convertible

Mitsuoka also offered a Galue convertible in China, the Middle East, and South Korea from 2007. Despite the shared name, the only similarity between the Galue-III saloon and the convertible is the front and rear styling. The rest of the car is based on the Ford Mustang, including the car's 4.0-litre V6 and 4.6-litre V8 engines. In 2010, as the Mustang was revised, the engines were upgraded to 3.7-litre and 5.0-litre units for the V6 and V8, respectively.

== Second series: Galue 204 ==
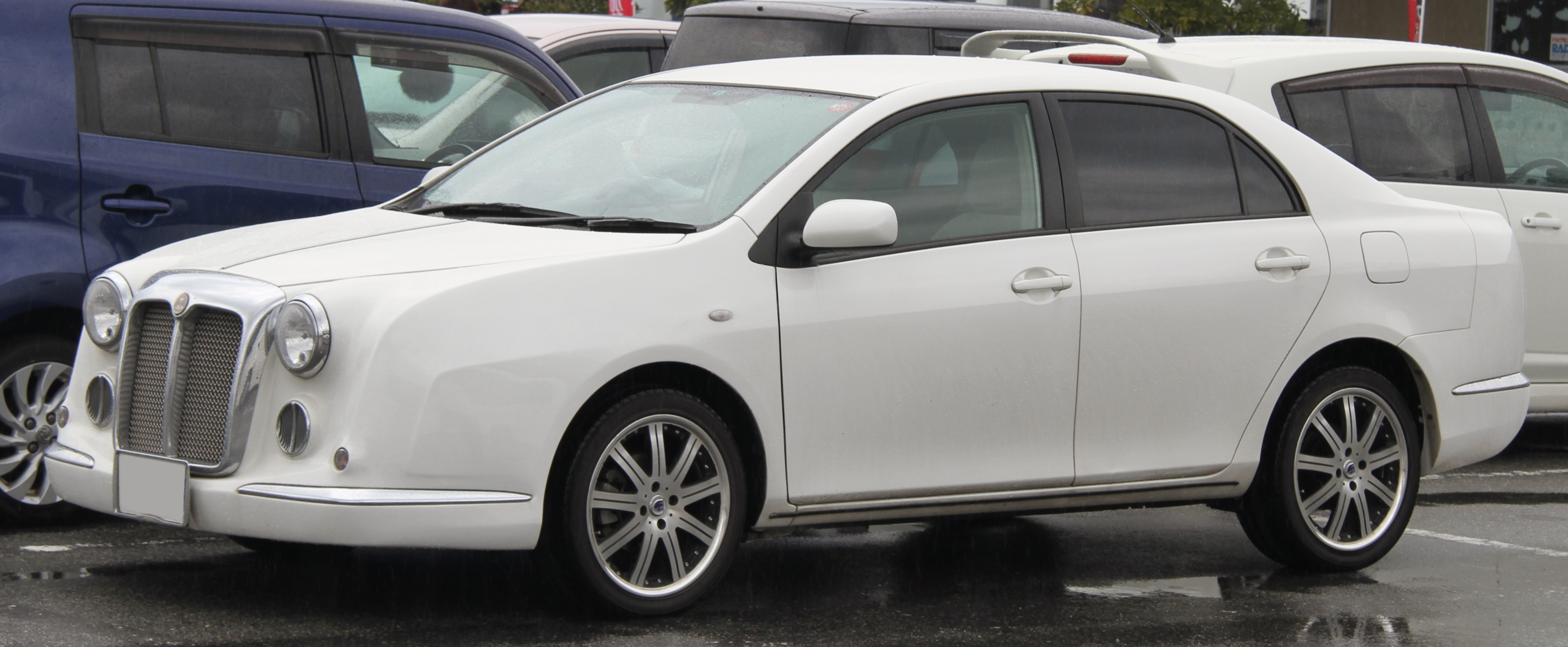
Mitsuoka Galue 204

The second Galue, called the Galue 204, is a smaller model, based on the Toyota Corolla Axio. Like the larger Galues it uses the same mechanicals (including 1.5-litre or 1.8-litre engines) and has modified styling and interior fittings. Although the grille is similar to the Galue-III's, it now has wire mesh instead of chrome slats, and thus is rather reminiscent of the Bentley Eight. The frontal styling includes circular chrome grilles beneath the headlamps, which are reminiscent of the grilles found on such cars as the Bentley R-type and the Jaguar Mark 2 behind which electric horns were concealed. The Galue 204 is intended to capitalise on the trend towards more economical cars by allowing people to buy a smaller car which is still luxurious and has some elements of classic styling. The 204 in the new model's name is Mitsuoka's internal code for the design: the 2 refers to the class of car while the 04 is the generation of the design.

== Third series ==
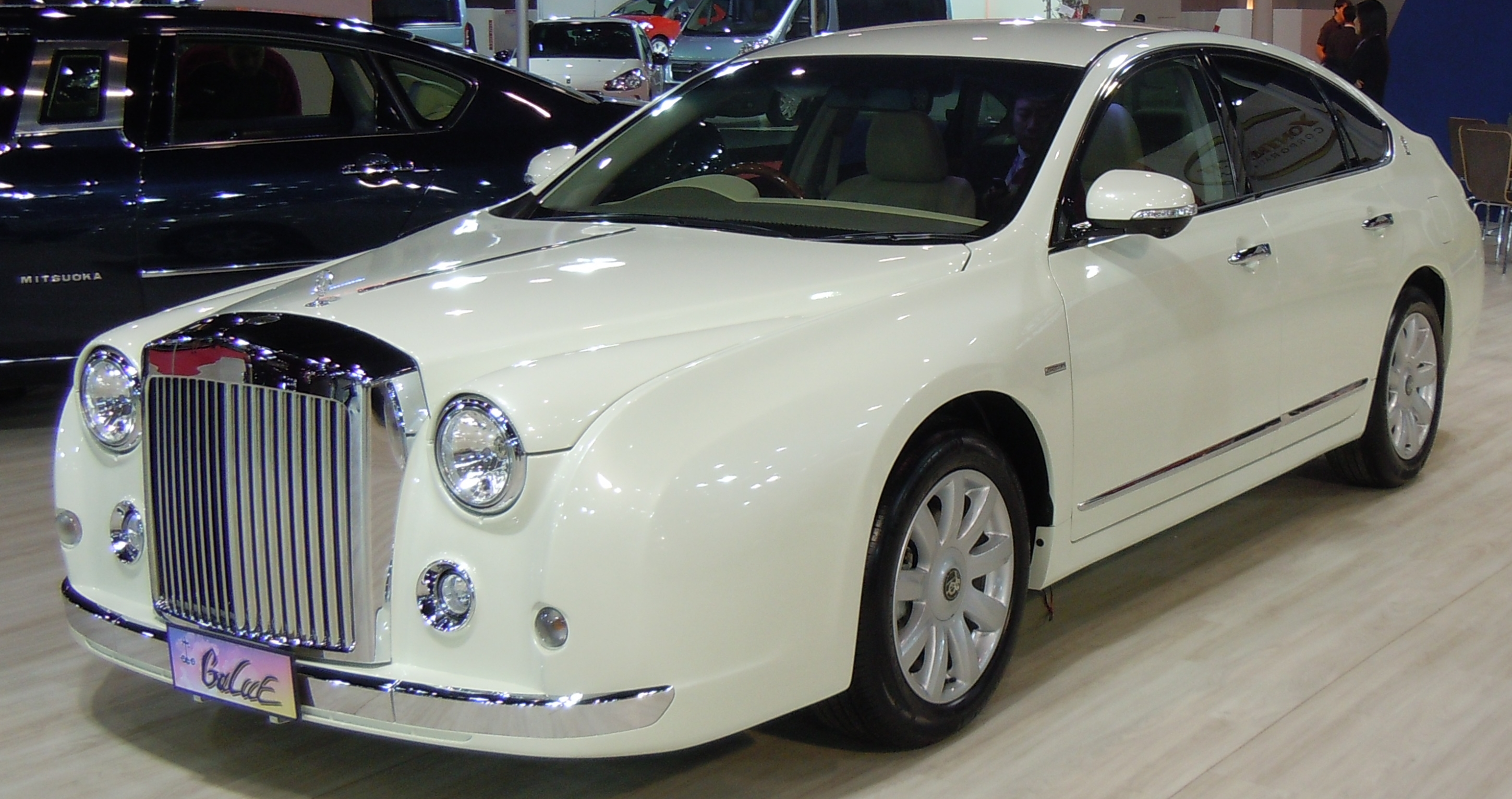
2011 Mitsuoka Galue

The fourth-generation Galue was released in 2010 and was based on the Nissan Teana J32. The car was lengthened 100 mm (3.9 in) and the front styling was again modified. The interior was nearly identical to the Teana save for the steering wheel badge. In 2012 the 3.5L V6 engine was dropped, and there were various exterior and interior changes. A limited-edition model, the Galue Vigore, was released in 2013. Based on the 25LX trim, it had Alcantara seats and lace curtains for the rear doors as well as a BOSE surround sound radio.

== Fourth series ==

2015 Mitsuoka Galue

The fifth generation was released in 2015 and is based on the Nissan Teana L33, but with tail lights from the Fiat 500. A left-hand drive version based on the Canadian-market Altima 3.5 SL was made available in this generation.

== Numbering system ==
The numbering system of the first Galue series was affected by whether two Galues or only one were in production. If only one was being made, it was generally referred to as Galue; if two, the models were given the number of their order of introduction. Thus while the Crew-based Galue was the only one being made, it was called Galue; but when the Galue-II was introduced as well, it was renamed Galue-I. The exception to this rule is the Cedric-based Galue, which was called Galue-II throughout its life.

This is the set of names that was used for the saloon cars:

Date	Crew-based	Cedric-based	Fuga-based	Corolla-based	Teana/Altima-based
1996-1999	Galue	-	-	-	-
1999-2001	Galue-I	Galue-II	-	-	-
2001-2006	-	Galue-II	-	-	-
2006-2008	-	-	Galue	-	-
2008-2014	-	-	Galue-III	Galue 204	-
2015–Present	-	-	-	-	Galue-IV / V

The convertible has always been called simply Galue, and this has not changed with the advent of the Galue 204.
