= Mitsuoka Himiko =

Overview
- Manufacturer: Mitsuoka
- Also called: Mitsuoka Roadster (UK)
- Production: 2008–present
- Assembly: Toyama City, Toyama
- Designer: Takanori Aoki

Body and chassis
- Class: Grand tourer
- Body style: 2 door convertible
- Layout: Front mid-engine, rear-wheel-drive
- Platform: Mazda N platform
- Related: Mazda MX-5

The Mitsuoka Himiko is a luxury roadster designed and built by Mitsuoka. It is named after Himiko, an obscure shaman queen of Yamataikoku in ancient Wa. In the UK it is known as the Mitsuoka Roadster.

== First generation (2008–2018) ==
First generation
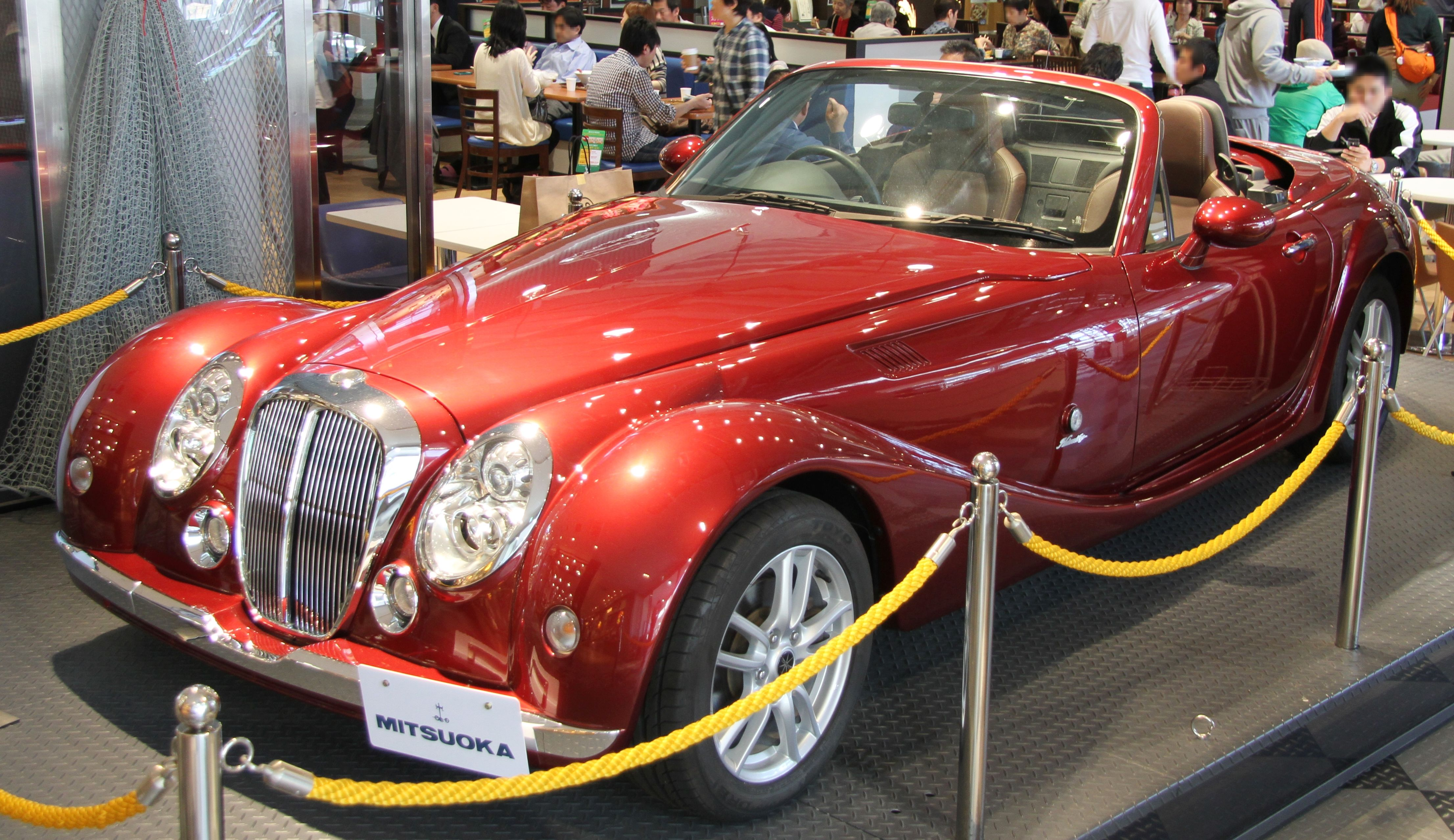

Overview
- Production: 2008–2018

Body and chassis
- Platform: Mazda NC
- Related: Mazda MX-5 (NC)

Powertrain
- Engine: 2.0L Mazda MZR I4
- Transmission: 6-speed manual; 6-speed automatic

Dimensions
- Wheelbase: 3,030 mm (119 in)
- Length: 4,575 mm (180.1 in)
- Height: 1,245 mm (49.0 in)
- Curb weight: 1,230–1,280 kg (2,710–2,820 lb)

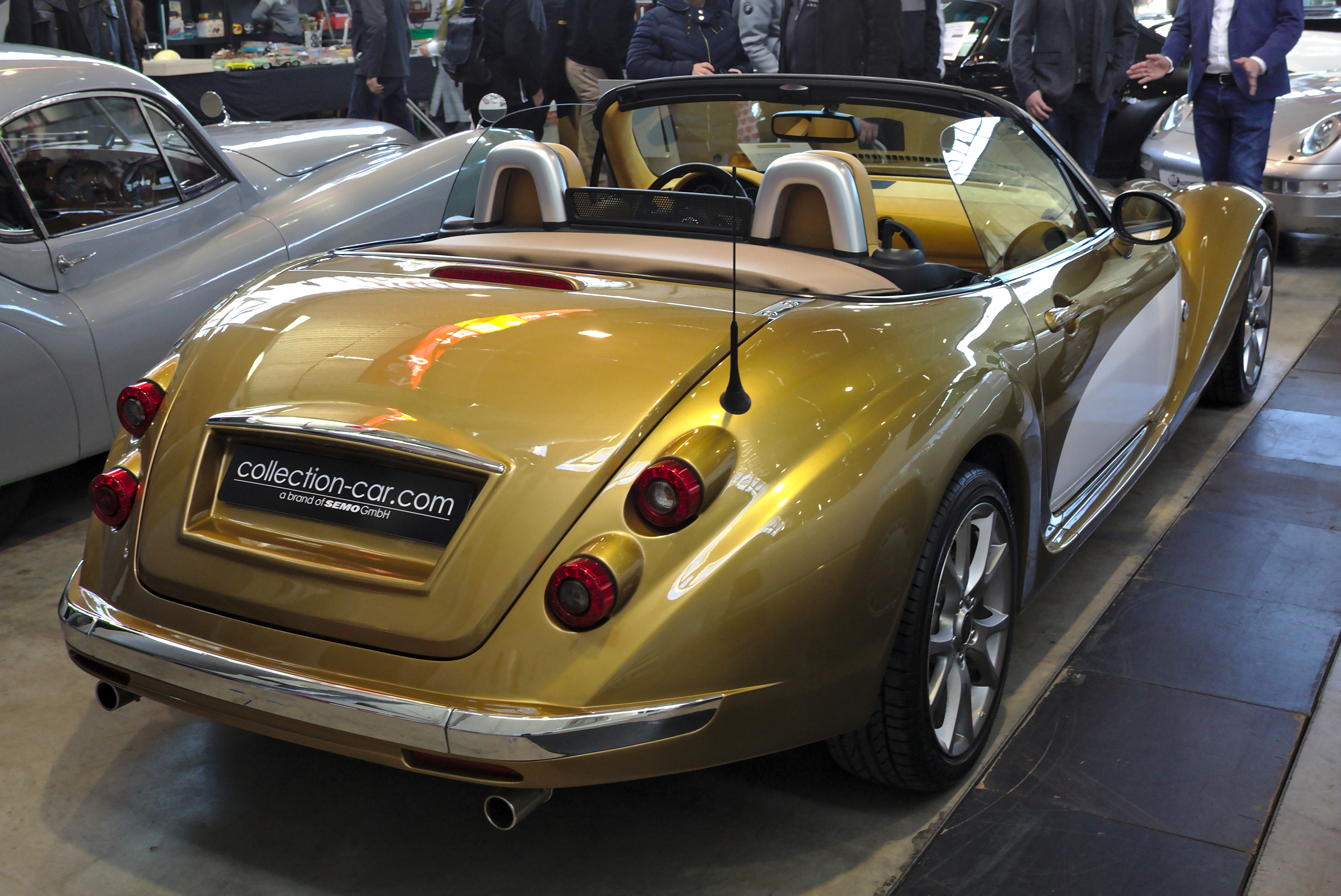
Rear view

Based on the Mazda MX-5 NC, Mitsuoka replaces most of the body panels, fits fibre-reinforced plastic paneling, leather seats and extends the wheelbase front of the A-pillar to generate the long bonnet line reminiscent of English roadsters such as the Jaguar XK120 and Morgan Aero 8. Designed by Takanori Aoki, the exterior theme of the Himiko is said to mimic a 'ship riding the high seas cruising majestically as one with the waves'. Transmission and roof options are similar to the MX-5 with the option of either a 6-speed automatic transmission with manual shifting or a 6-speed manual transmission. Each Mitsuoka vehicle is handmade by 45 craftsmen at the Mitsuoka factory in Toyama City, Japan.

== Second generation (2018–present) ==
Second generation
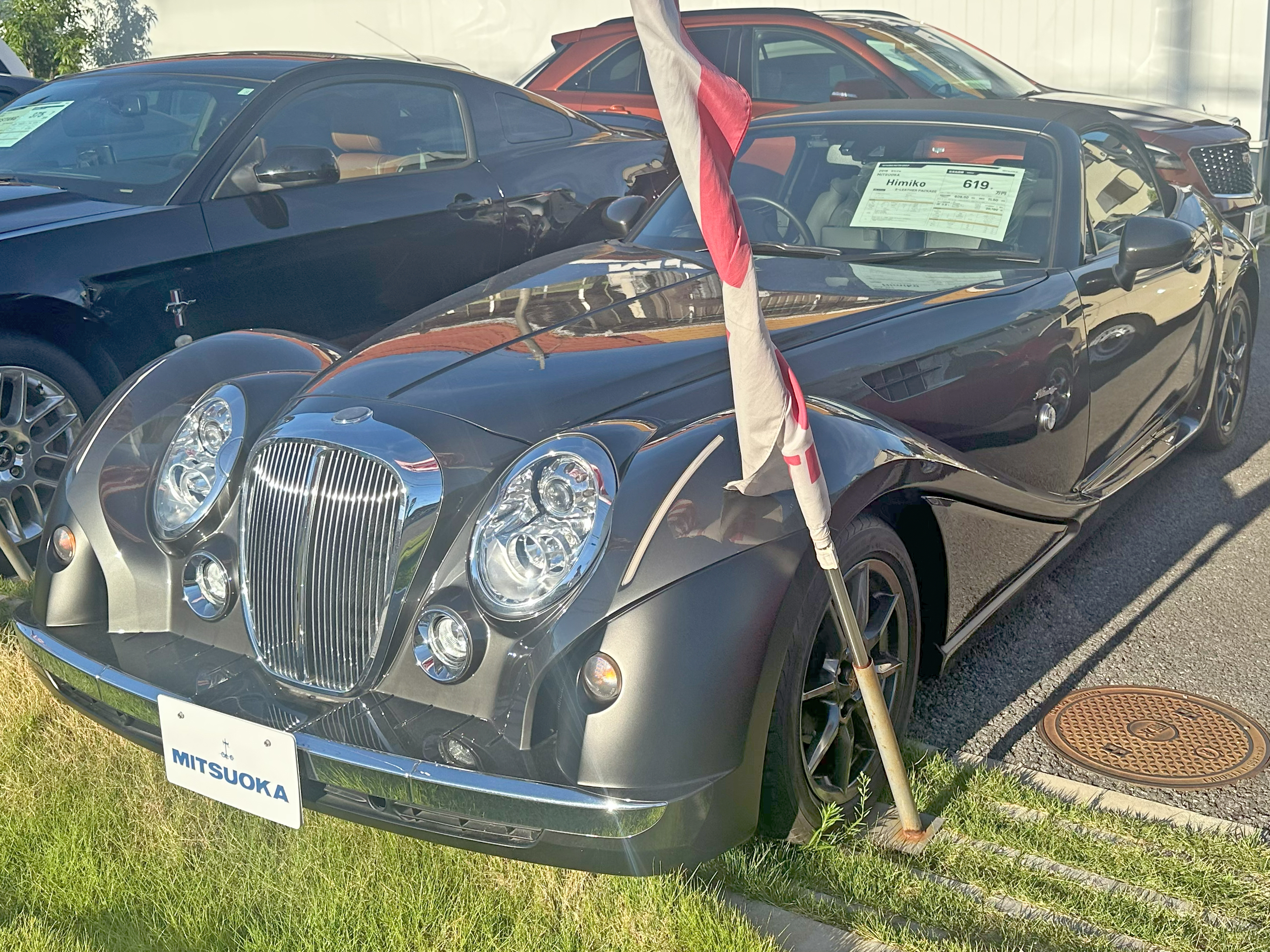

Overview
- Production: 2018–present

Body and chassis
- Platform: Mazda ND
- Related: Mazda MX-5 (ND); Fiat 124 Spider (2016)

Powertrain
- Engine: 1.5 L Mazda SKYACTIV-G
- Transmission: 6-speed manual; 6-speed automatic

Dimensions
- Wheelbase: 2,910 mm (115 in)
- Length: 4,580 mm (180 in)
- Height: 1,255 mm (49.4 in)
- Curb weight: 1,130–1,200 kg (2,490–2,650 lb)

The second-generation Himiko was released in 2018. Now based on the Mazda MX-5 ND, the styling remains nearly identical to the previous generation. The retractable hard top previously available was dropped and was replaced with a folding soft top.
