= Mitsuoka Orochi =

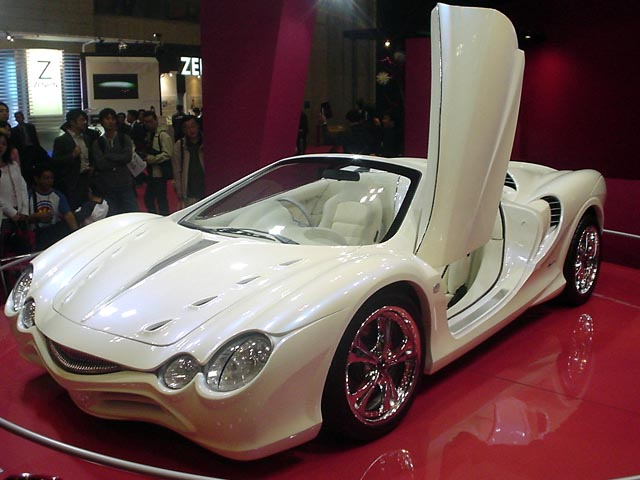

Overview
- Manufacturer: Mitsuoka
- Production: 2006–2014

Body and chassis
- Class: Sports car
- Body style: 2-door coupé 2-door convertible
- Layout: MR layout
- Doors: Scissor
- Related: Honda NSX (first generation)

Powertrain
- Engine: 3.3 L Toyota 3MZ-FE V6
- Transmission: 5-speed automatic

Dimensions
- Length: 4,560 mm (179.5 in)
- Width: 2,035 mm (80.1 in)
- Height: 1,180 mm (46.5 in)
- Curb weight: 1,580 kg (3,483 lb)

The Mitsuoka Orochi (Japanese: 光岡大蛇) is a Japanese sports car designed and built by Mitsuoka Motors as a concept car in 2001, with updates and revisions to the design appearing in 2003 and 2005, before finally being put into production and offered for sale in late 2006 as a 2007 model. The car takes its name from the mythical Yamata no Orochi 8-headed Japanese dragon. Mitsuoka says "Orochi is the car to ride to gather attention from everyone", and categorizes this car as a "Fashion-Super Car".

== Development and design ==
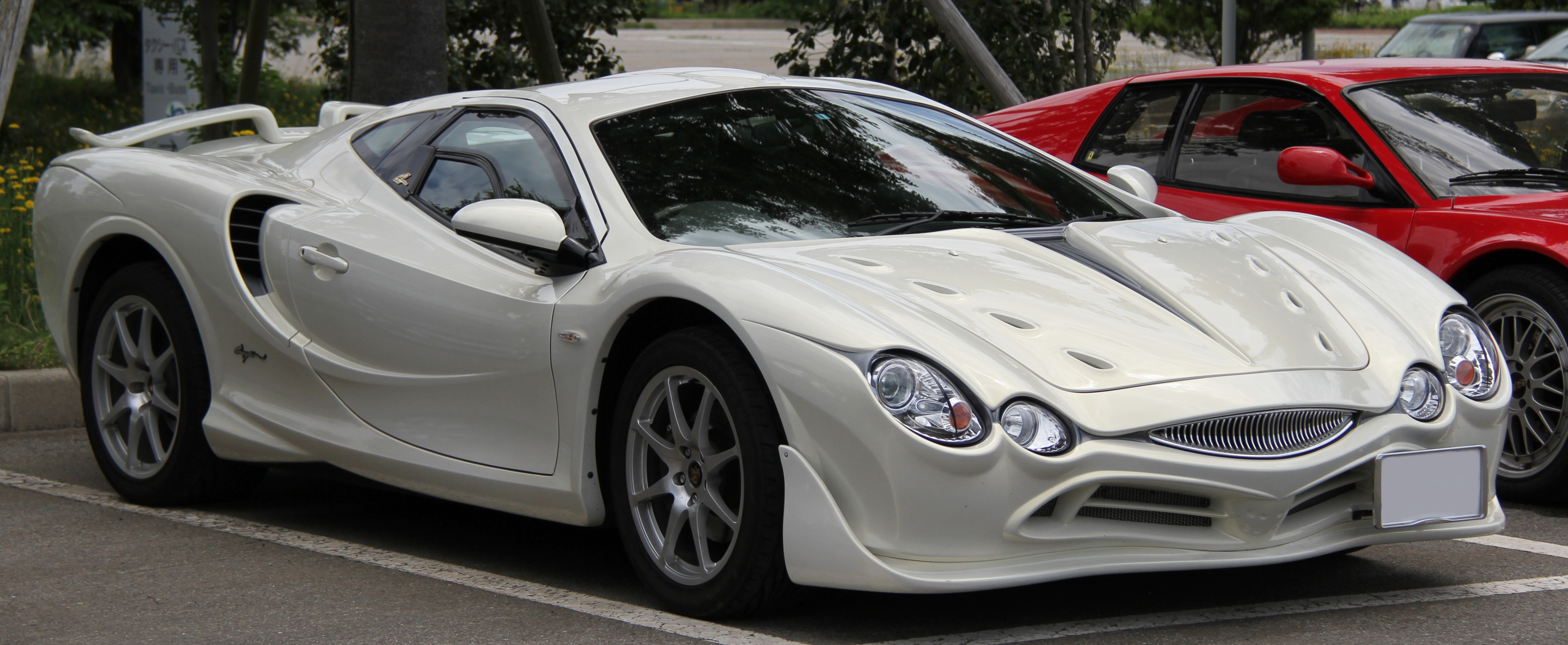
Mitsuoka Orochi

The Orochi was originally unveiled at the 2001 Tokyo Motor Show as a concept car based on the Honda NSX platform. Mitsuoka unveiled a new convertible version at the 2005 Tokyo Motor Show, calling it the Orochi Nude Top. In October 2006, Mitsuoka officially launched the production version of the Orochi. Production was limited to 400 units over four years. The first Orochis were set to be delivered in January 2007.

The name Orochi is derived from Yamata no Orochi, a legendary eight-headed eight-tailed Japanese dragon.

=== Interior ===
The Orochi's interior is fully trimmed with leather. The car is also equipped with motorized wing mirrors and windows, A/C, airbags, low-beam side HID, an immobilizer, and a Panasonic satnav.

== Variants ==
=== Orochi Kabuto ===
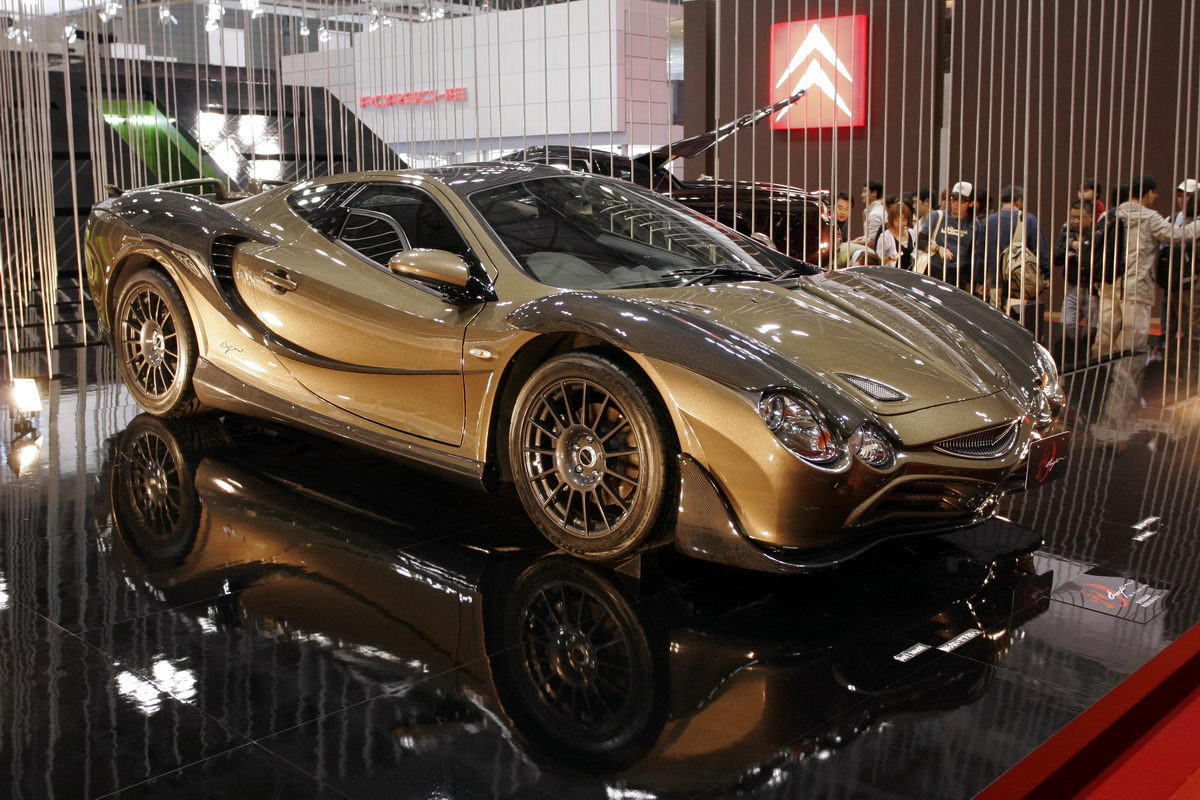
Mitsuoka Orochi Kabuto at the 2007 Tokyo Motor Show

At the 2007 Tokyo Motor Show, Mitsuoka unveiled the Orochi Kabuto (大蛇・兜) as a concept car. The Kabuto retained the Orochi's basic construction, but has been fitted with carbon fiber panels, a body kit, and a rear spoiler.

The Orochi Kabuto was later released as a production car in 2009, and was limited to five cars. Like the concept car, the production Orochi Kabuto was equipped with carbon fiber body panels, a body kit, and a rear spoiler. The car was also given four tail pipes for its exhaust system to enhance exhaust noise. The engine was further tuned to produce more power. The interior saw updates as well; several interior parts were replaced with aluminium counterparts. The seats in the Orochi Kabuto were leather with diamond stitching.

=== Orochi Zero ===
As a cheaper alternative to the Orochi, Mitsuoka launched the Orochi Zero (大蛇・零, Orochi・rei) in January 2008. The Orochi Zero had fewer metal-plated accessory parts, synthetic leather, and reduced soundproofing around the engine to reduce costs. The Zero's exterior paint and interior leather colour were also not customisable. Production was limited to 20 Orochi Zeros per year.

=== Orochi Gold Premium ===
In 2010, Mitsuoka revealed the Orochi Gold Premium (オロチ ゴールドプレミアム, Orochi Gōrudo Puremiamu) model of the Orochi. Limited to 20 vehicles, the car was made available first in Japan and then to a wider Asian market. The Gold Premium model has both an additional front and rear spoiler and modified variable note exhaust system with four tail pipes as opposed to two on the standard Orochi. The interior now uses alcantara on the seats and steering wheel. On the exterior, the Orochi Gold Premium has been given a new paint job with gold trim and badges, from which it derives its name.

=== Orochi Final Edition ===
In April 2014, Mitsuoka announced that the Orochi is due to be discontinued. It also revealed that in order to celebrate its production run, a Final Edition was unveiled. Only five cars will be produced. This car features two exclusive paint hues, Gold Pearl and a purple hue called 'Fuyoru' by the company. Three cars will be painted in Gold Pearl, with the other two will be painted in Fuyoru. It also features exclusive black-painted alloy wheels that are not found on other Orochis. Other cosmetic differences include a new front lip spoiler and a rear wing. The interior also gains new colour-specific trims. Cars painted in Gold Pearl will have a centre console with an Ash Grey and Dark Red colour combination, complete with Alcantara-wrapped seats and steering wheel. Fuyoru-coloured cars get an Ash Grey-coloured centre console, with a similar Alcantara seat trim and contrasting purple stitching. The engine does not have any power upgrades. The vehicle will be priced at approximately US$125,000.

=== Seven Eleven Evangelion Limited Edition ===
In November 2014 another edition was announced, with a striking multi-coloured paint scheme designed to invoke the giant robots from the 1990s Evangelion anime series. It is based on the Gold Premium platform, will be limited to one car, and sell for 16 million yen (US$151,022).

=== Orochi Devilman ===
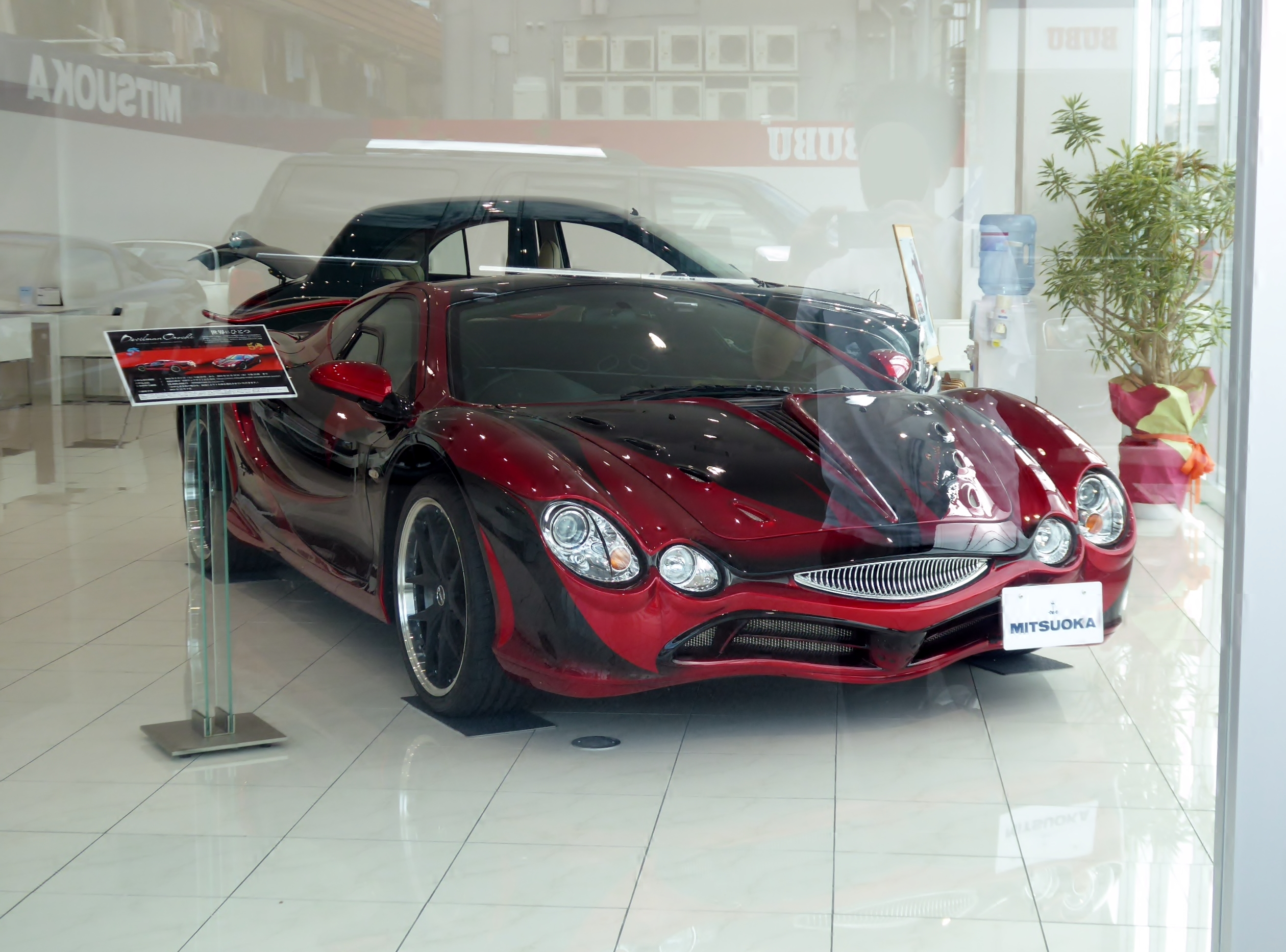
Orochi Devilman

In September 2018, Mitsuoka collaborated with Go Nagai, creator of the Devilman series, to create the Orochi Devilman, modeled after a car from the anime adaptation Devilman Crybaby. It is limited to one car and will sell for 19.8 million yen (US$175,364).

== Reception ==
The Mitsuoka Orochi has been widely panned by American and English reviewers. Commonly called the "World's Ugliest Car" by publications such as Jalopnik, the Orochi has been greatly criticized for its appearance and design. Not all reviewers were as harsh, however. The Orochi has been called "bold" and "polarizing".

== Media ==
The Mitsuoka Orochi has been featured as a licenced car in a handful of videogames. Some notable videogames include: Top Drives (2017) which features the 2001 concept car as well as the 2007, 2008, 2009, 2010 and 2012 models of the Orochi; GT Advanced 3: Pro Concept Racing, GT Cube and GT Pro Series (apart of the GT Advance videogame series) which each feature the 2001 concept car: and Auto Modellista, among some other games. GT Pro Series released alongside the launch of the Nintendo Wii, which first launched on the 19th of November, 2006 in North America, but because it is somewhat of a port of GT Cube for the Nintendo GameCube in 2003, it features the same roster of cars including the 2001 concept car for the Orochi despite production starting in October.
