= Retro-style automobile =

Vehicle styled to appear like cars from previous decades

A retro-style automobile is a vehicle that is styled to appear like cars from previous decades. Often these cars use modern technology and production techniques. This design trend has existed since at least the 1960s with the rise of neoclassic cars, but gained popularity in the early 1990s with major manufacturers, leading to many automakers introducing models that referenced previous cars of the 1950s and 1960s.

== Overview ==
Retro design usually references iconic classic vehicles. Another form of adopting classic style elements comes in the form of Revival Cars, with manufacturers such as Jaguar, Aston Martin, Alvis, Allard and Lister producing reproductions of classic models. Another example of classic inspired design is a Neoclassic, a modern car made to resemble one from the 1920s-1930's. Technically, retro cars can differ greatly from the historical models they reference.

As early as 1961, American designer Virgil Exner used elements of classic automobile design for the new models of Chrysler's top brand Imperial. The 1961 Imperials had free-standing headlights, and the sides of the cars featured a chrome strip that mimicked the line of curved fenders. Exner later transferred the concept to the newly formed Stutz Motor Company brand, whose Blackhawk range was referred to as the Revival Car in the United States. The 1980 Cadillac Seville referenced the Hooper tail of the 1950s and the 1983 Lincoln Mark VII had a hint of a spare wheel bulge in the trunk lid.

Retro design reached its first peak with the Mazda MX-5, which in its first form from 1989 to 1998, referenced the Lotus Elan from 1962 and was considered the first newly designed roadster in decades. Between 1989 and 1991, Nissan produced the retro-inspired 'Pike Cars'; the Nissan Be-1, Nissan Pao, Nissan Figaro and Nissan S-Cargo in limited production, which are often credited as pioneers of the retro design trend. In Japan, retro packages for various small car models, such as the Daihatsu Mira or the Subaru Vivio, have also been popular since the 1990s. The success of retro design in Japan is also due to the kawaii aesthetic.

In 1994, a new version of the Volkswagen Beetle was presented as the “Volkswagen Concept one” study at the Detroit Motor Show. Since the reactions of trade fair visitors were positive, the concept was brought to the market in 1998 as the New Beetle, based on the Golf IV and without the typical Beetle rear engine. In Europe, this is considered the beginning of the retro wave, continuing in 1999 with the Jaguar S-Type, in 2000 with the Mini, in 2007 with the Fiat 500 and in 2009 with the Mercedes-Benz SLS AMG.

American companies, notably Chrysler, were also experimenting with retro design throughout the 1990s. American retro design can be traced back to when car designer Bob Lutz intended to create a modern interpretation of the Shelby Cobra. This idea would later morph into the Dodge Viper. The Viper helped positively shape the American public's opinion on the Chrysler Corporation, prompting Lutz to further experiment with retro design, with early examples including the 1994 Dodge Ram, with styling inspired by previous Kenworth and Peterbilt trucks, and the 1995 Chrysler Atlantic, inspired by various art-deco cars of the 1930s. Later American examples of retro design include the Plymouth Prowler in the style of a hot rod, the Chrysler PT Cruiser modelled on limousines of the 1930s and the Ford Thunderbird from 2003.

An important designer of retro cars is J Mays. According to experts, retro design has brought back emotionality in automobile design. At the beginning of the 2000s, retro design developed into new classic design . Vehicles like the Lancia Thesis consist of a mix of classic and modern design elements, without citing any specific historical vehicle.

Despite a fall in popularity, retro design has made a comeback in the early 2020s, with the development of cars such as the Renault 5 EV/Alpine A290, Ford Bronco and the continued production of retro and retro-inspired vehicles and body kits from brands like Jeep and Mitsuoka.

== Examples of retro-styled automobiles ==
=== Production cars ===
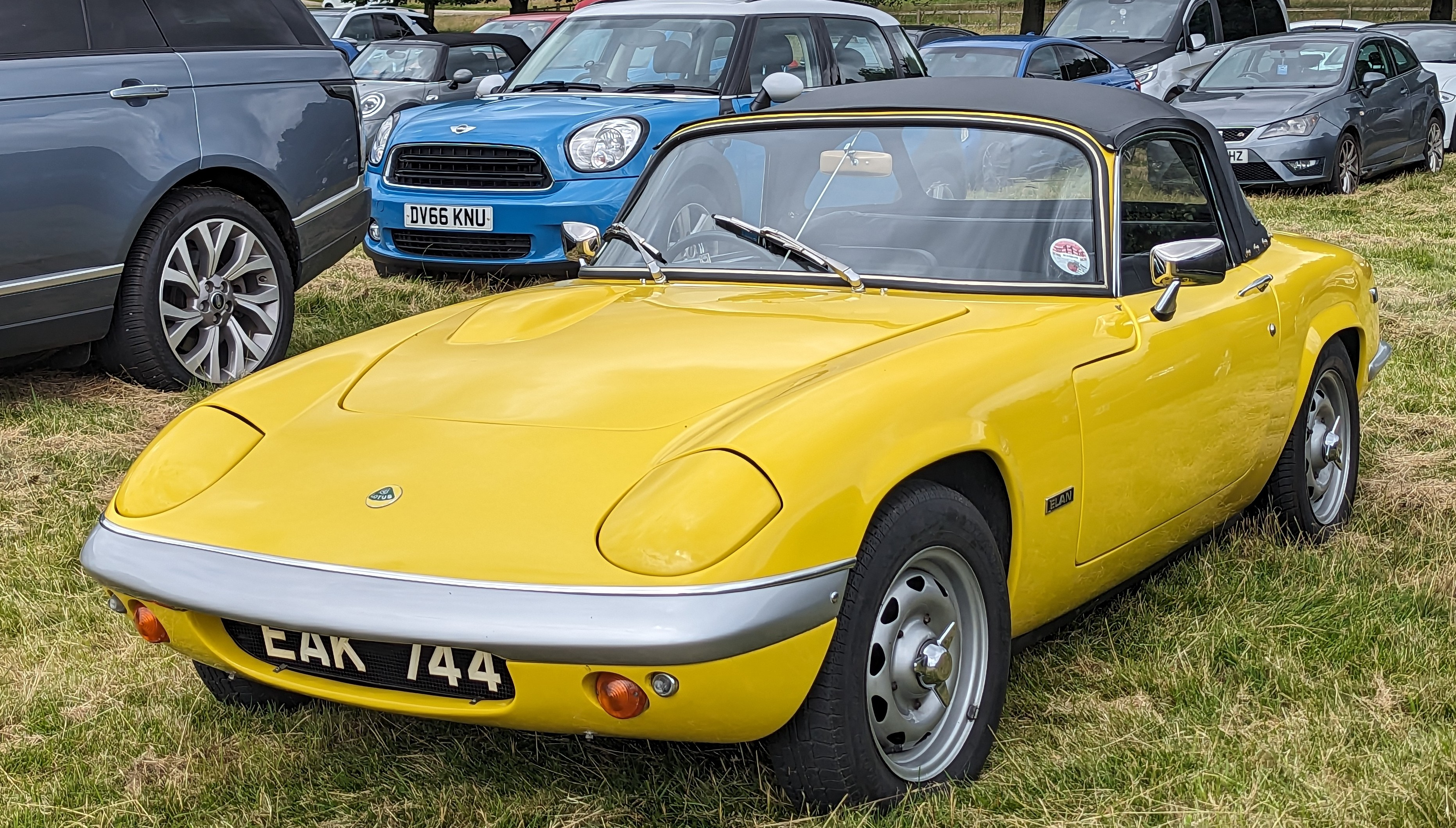
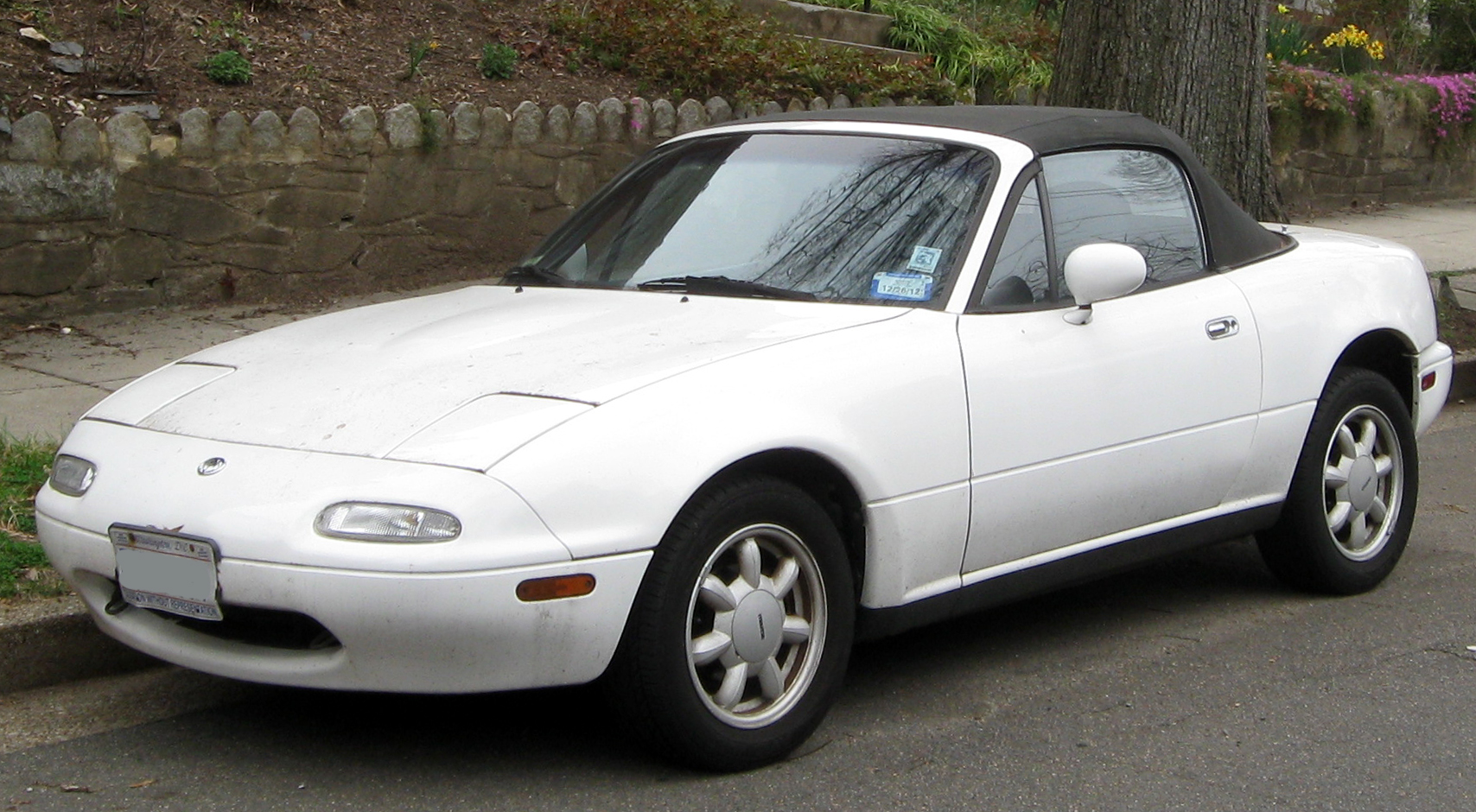
Lotus Elan and Mazda MX-5
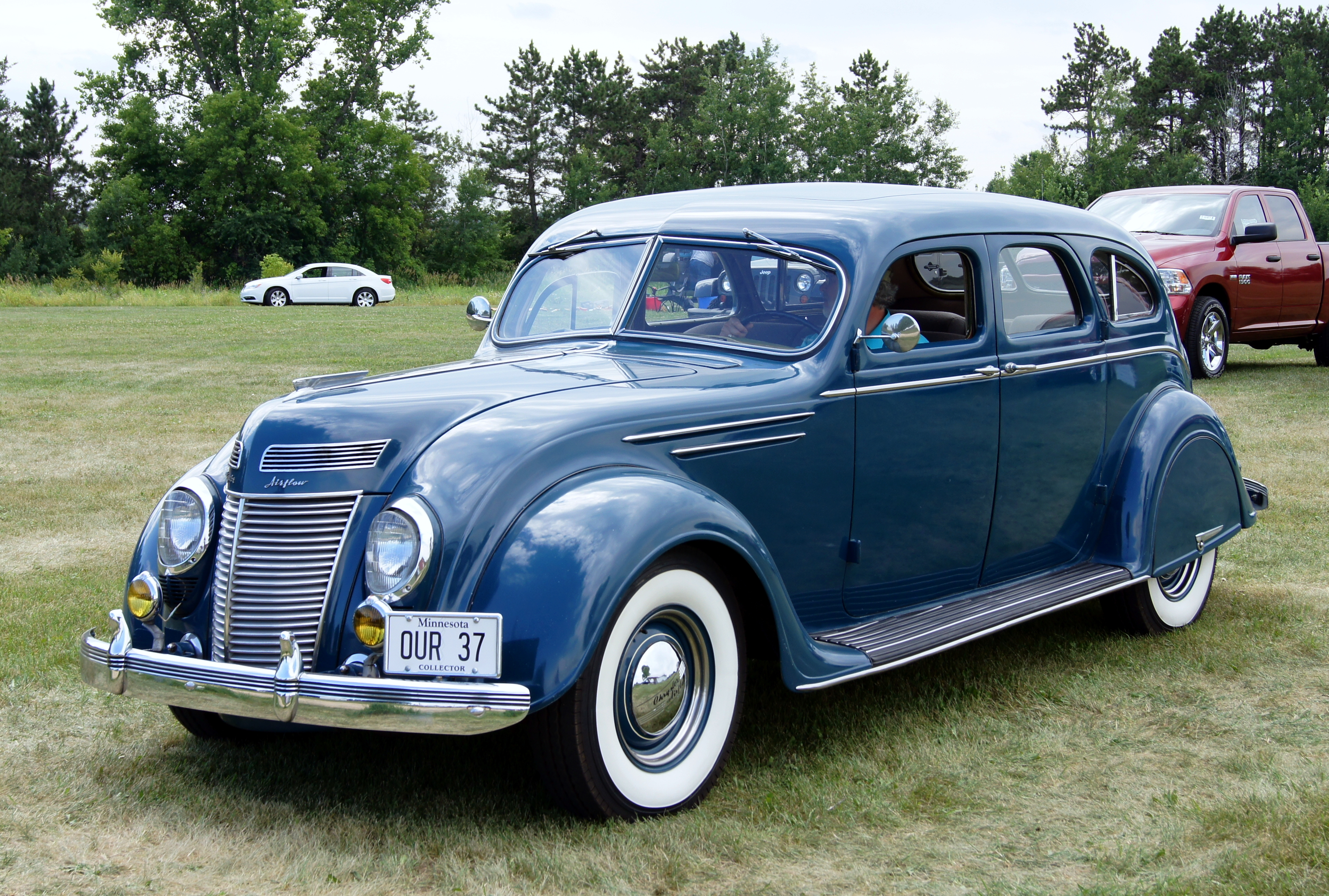
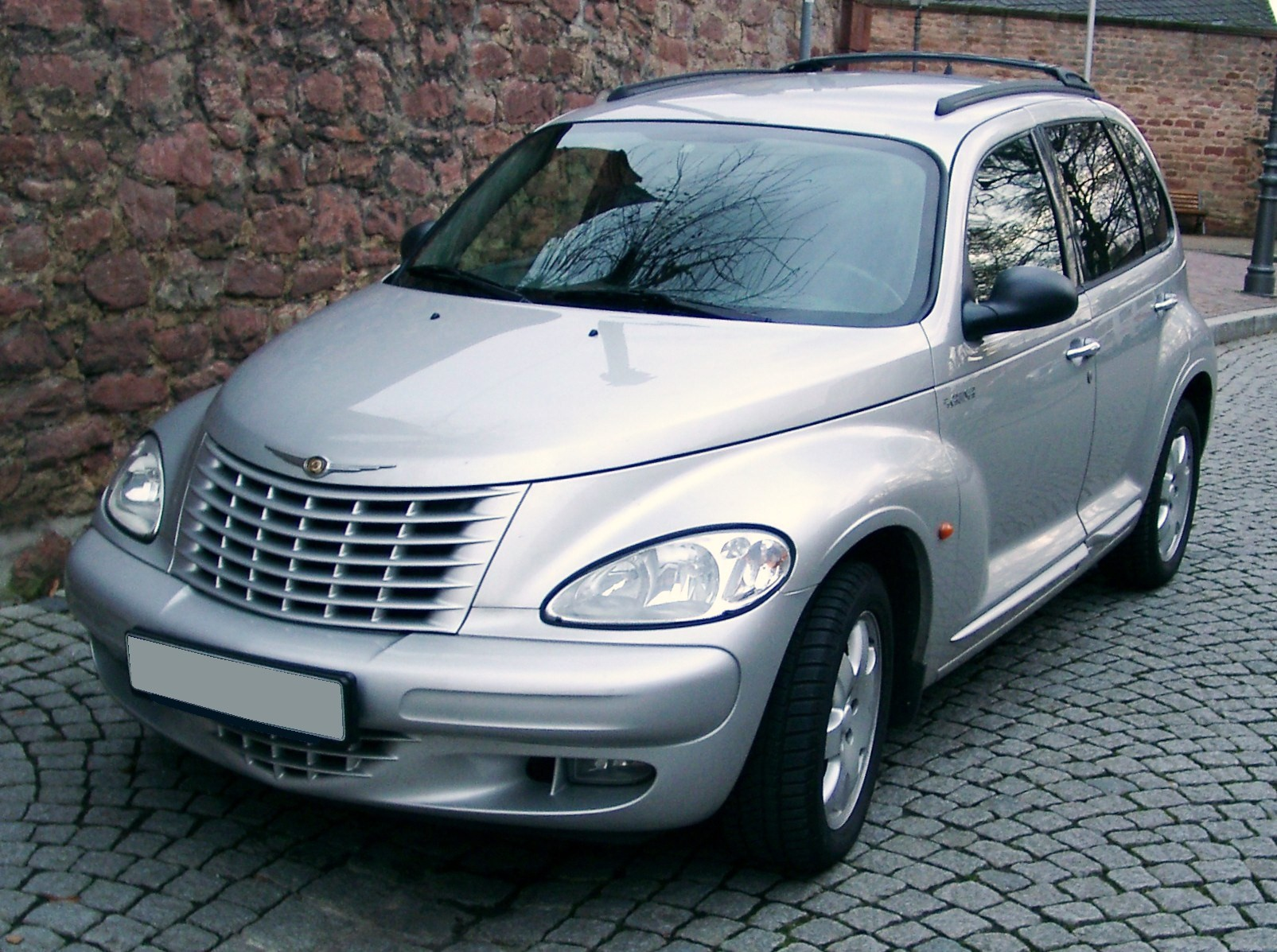
Chrysler Airflow and Chrysler PT Cruiser
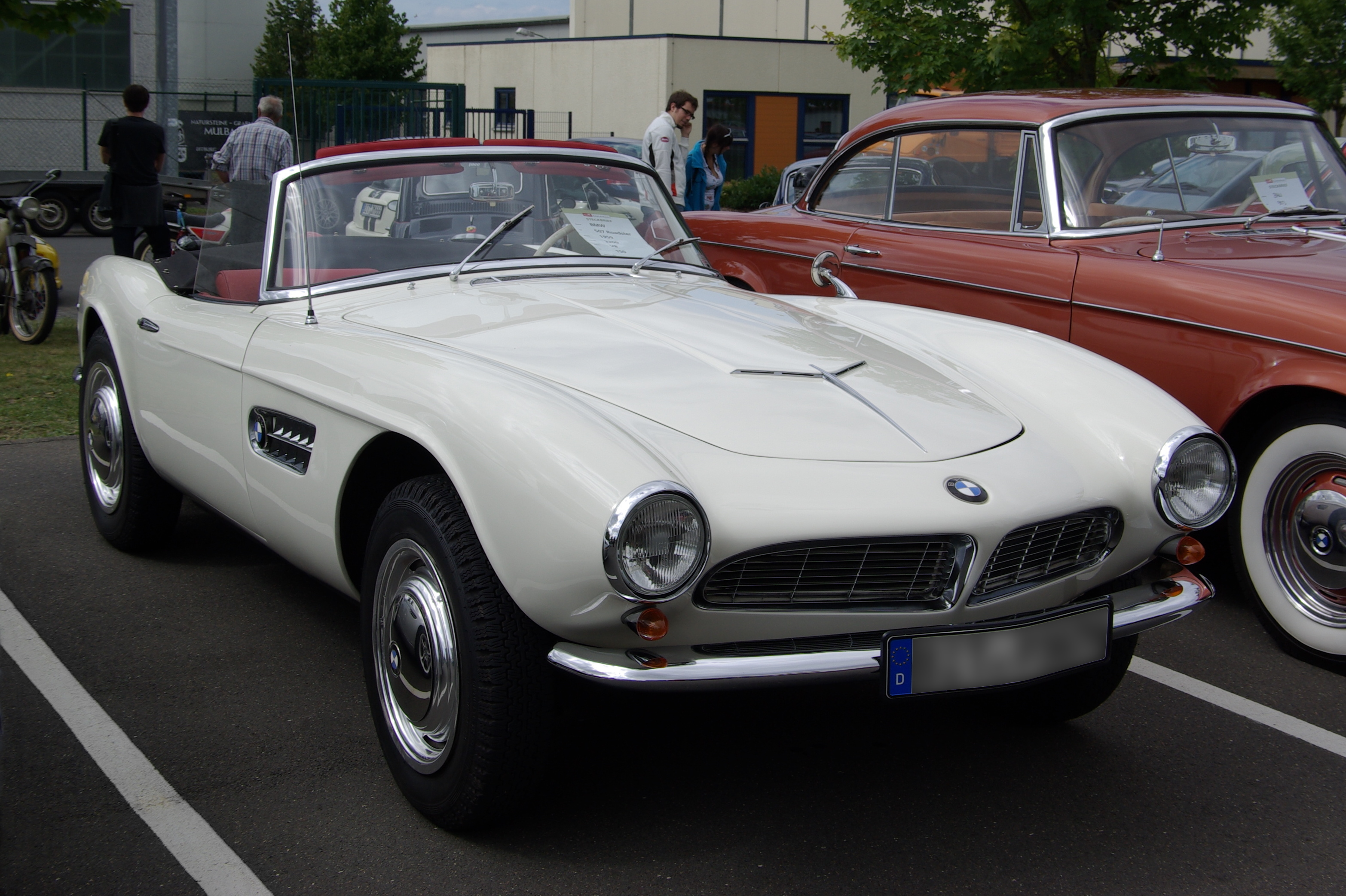
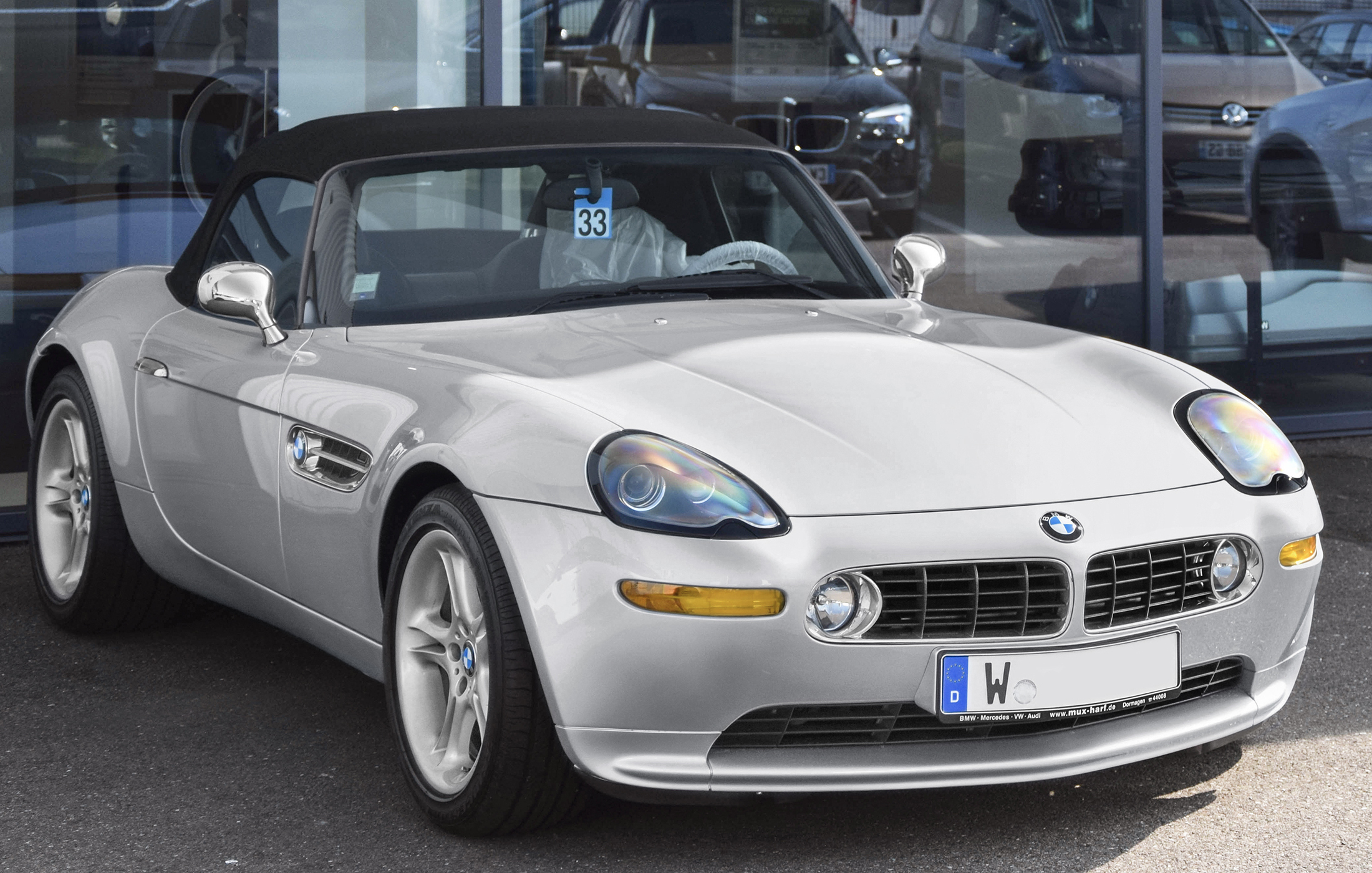
BMW 507 and BMW Z8
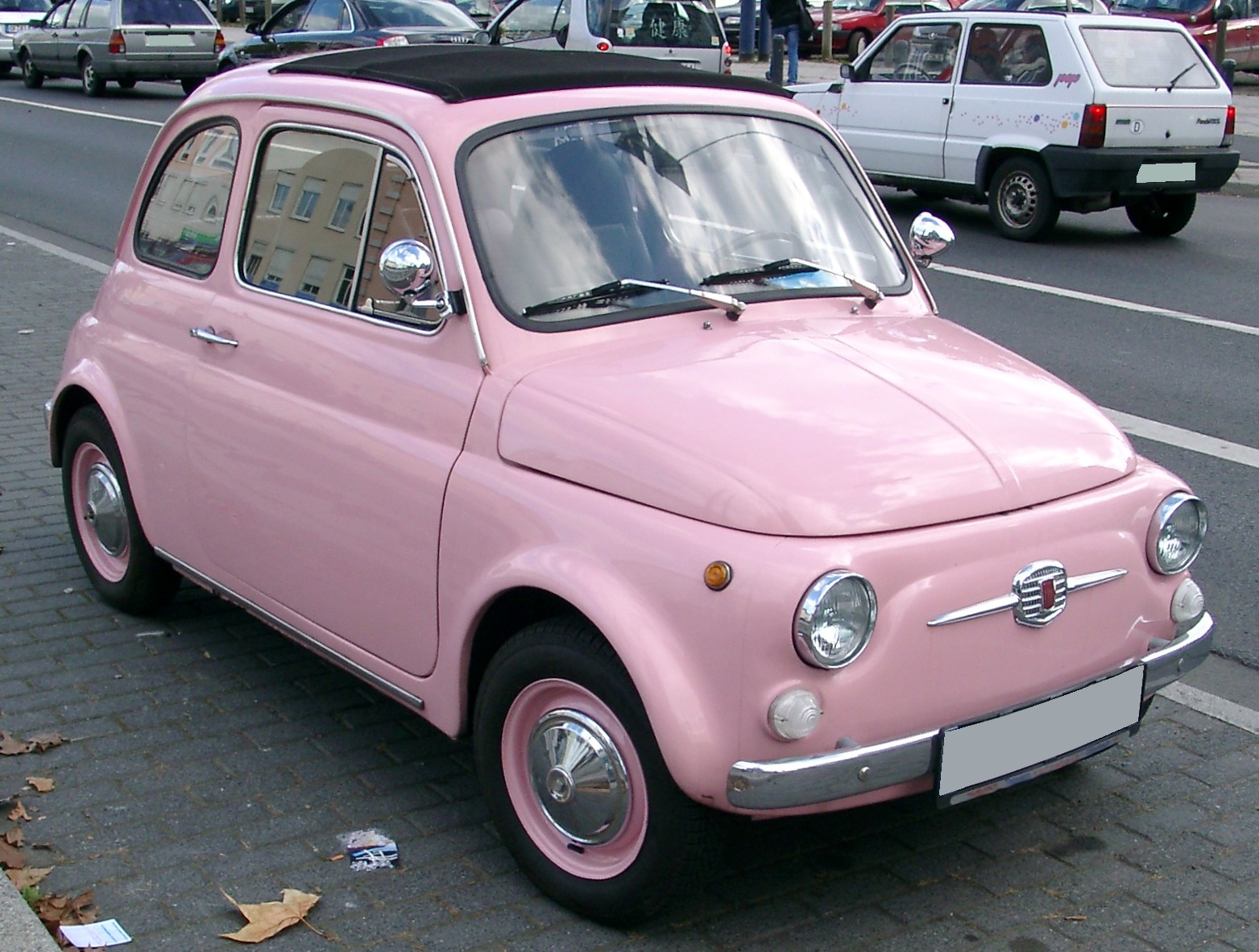
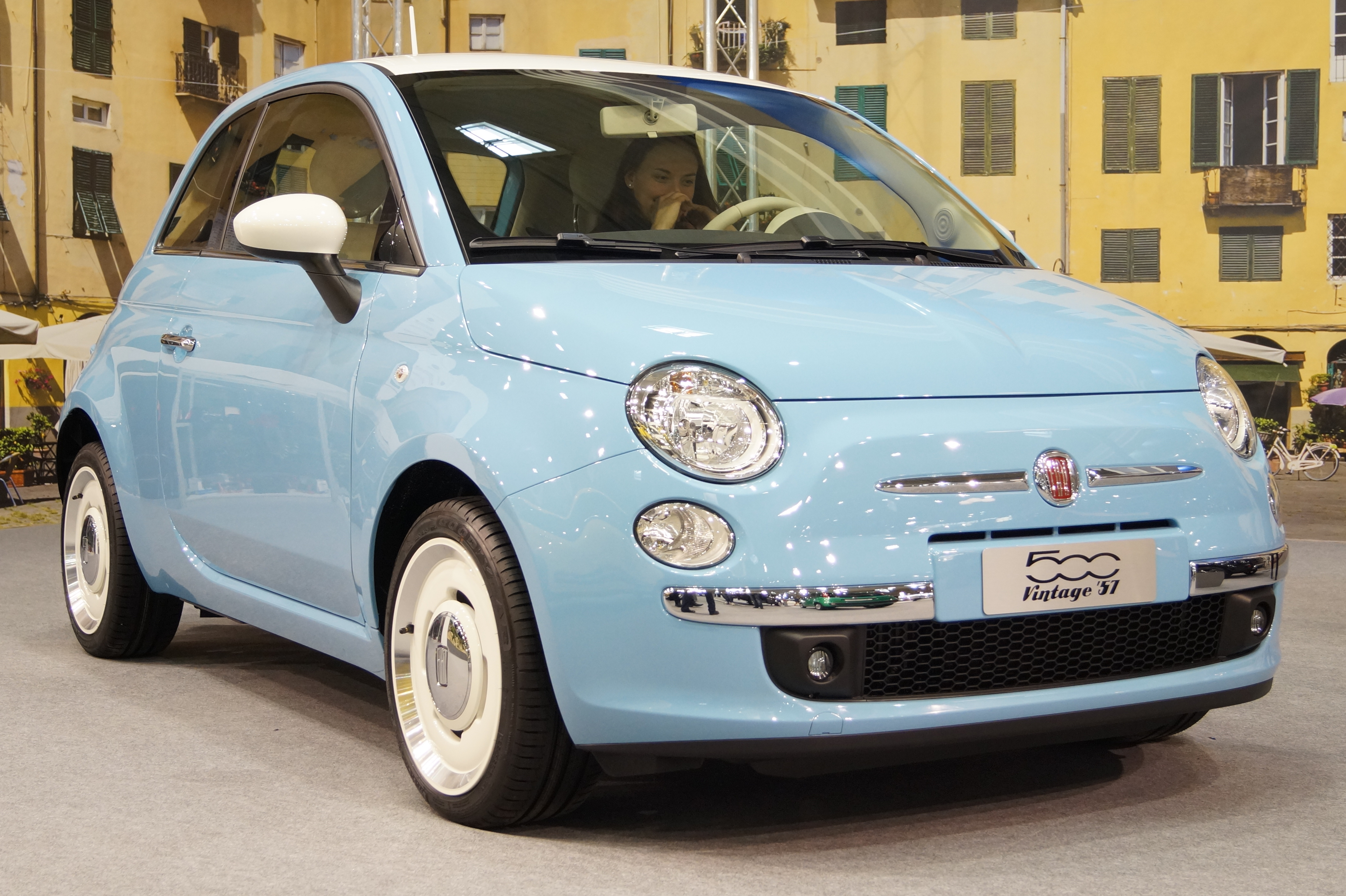
1957 Fiat 500 and 2015 Fiat 500
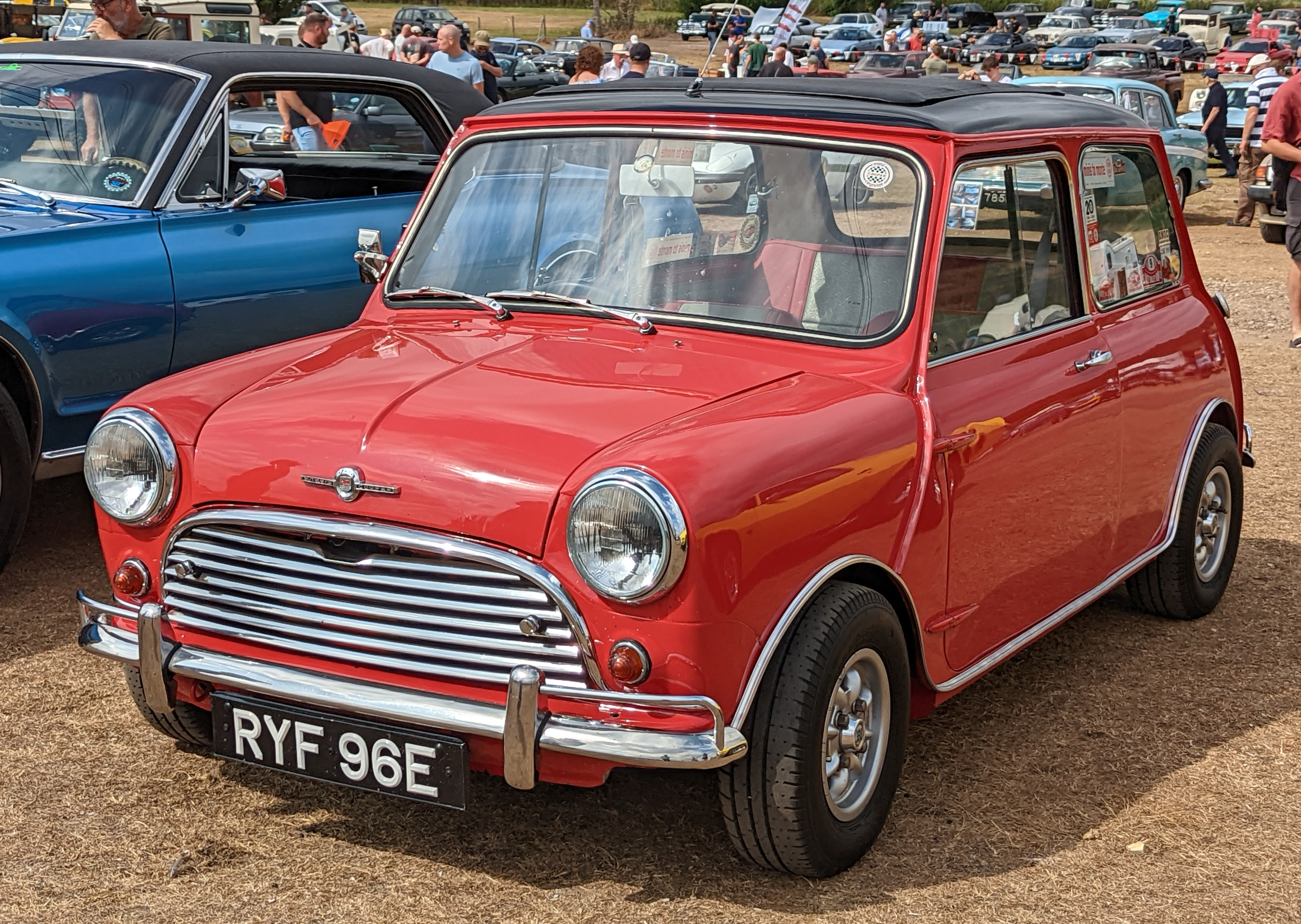
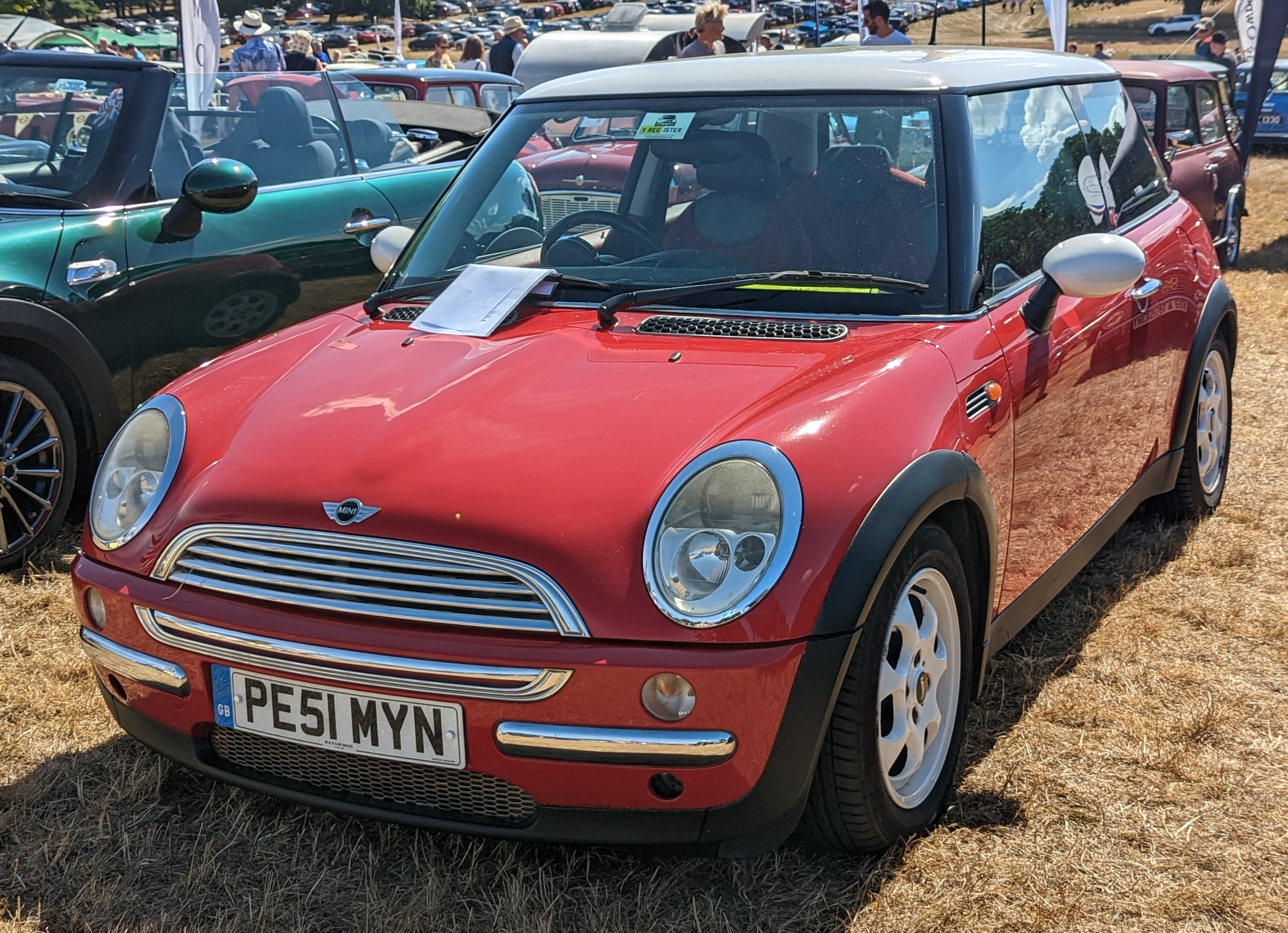
1967 Mini Cooper and 2001 Mini Cooper
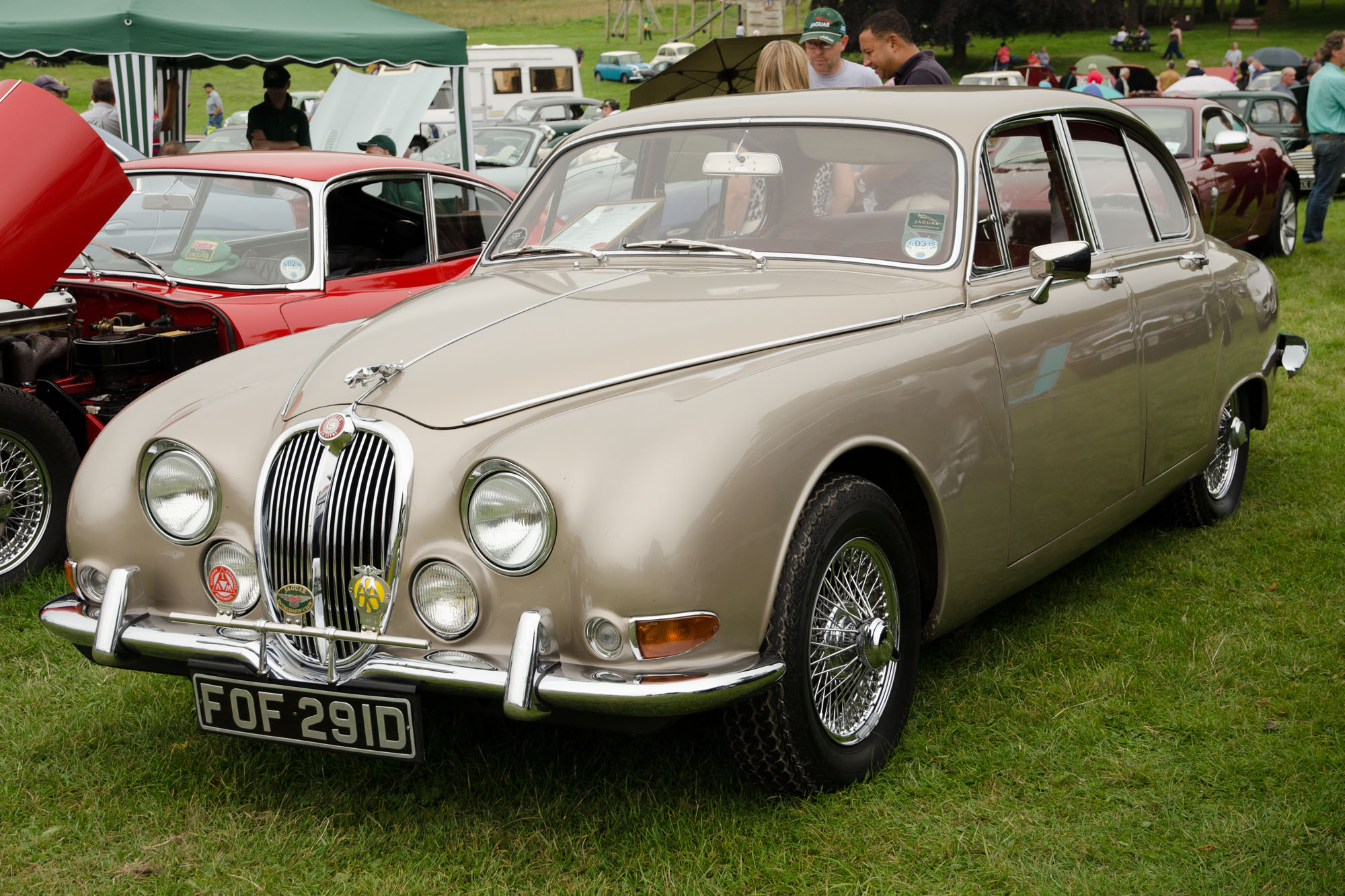
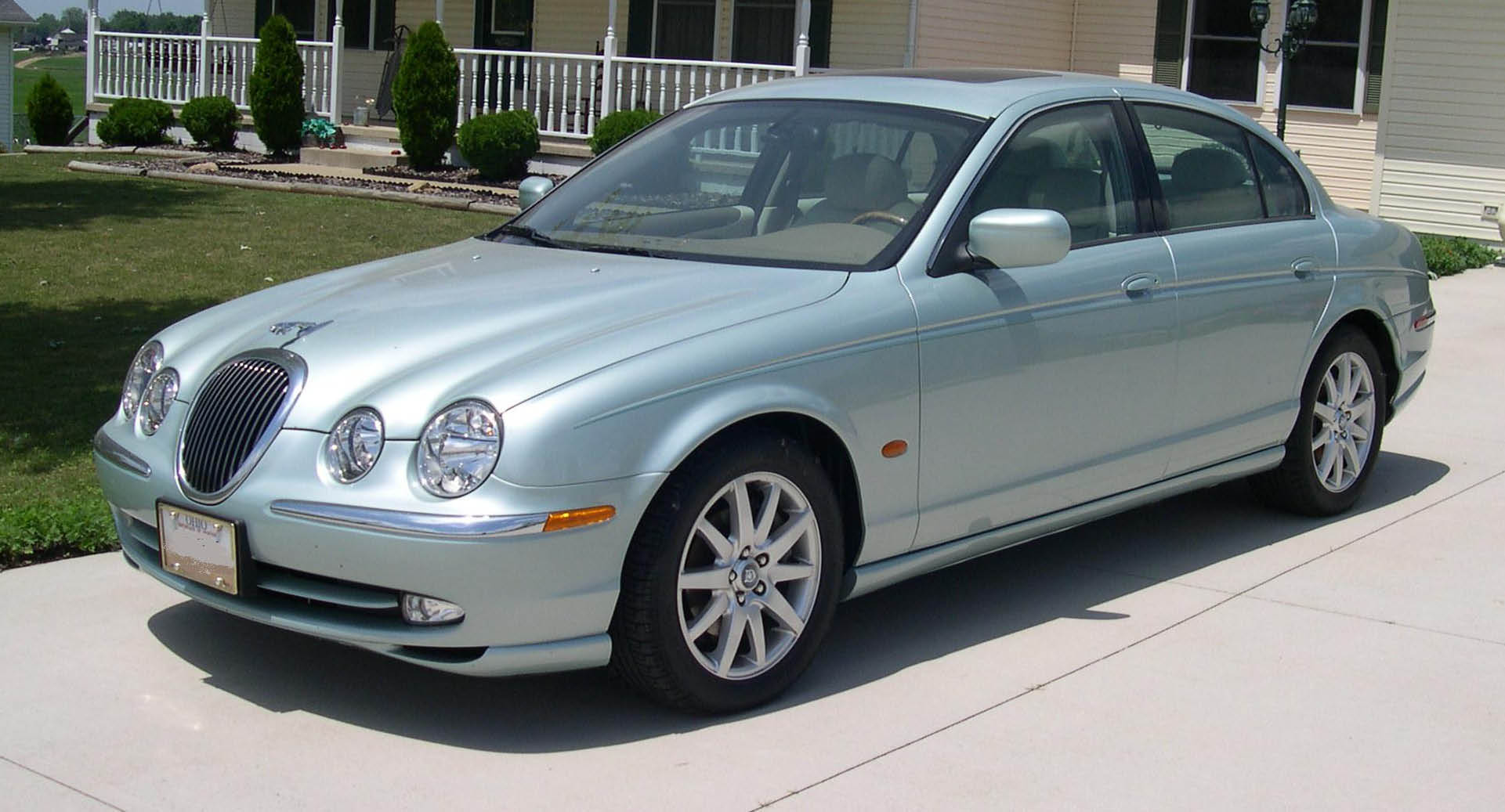
1966 Jaguar S-Type and 2001 Jaguar S-Type
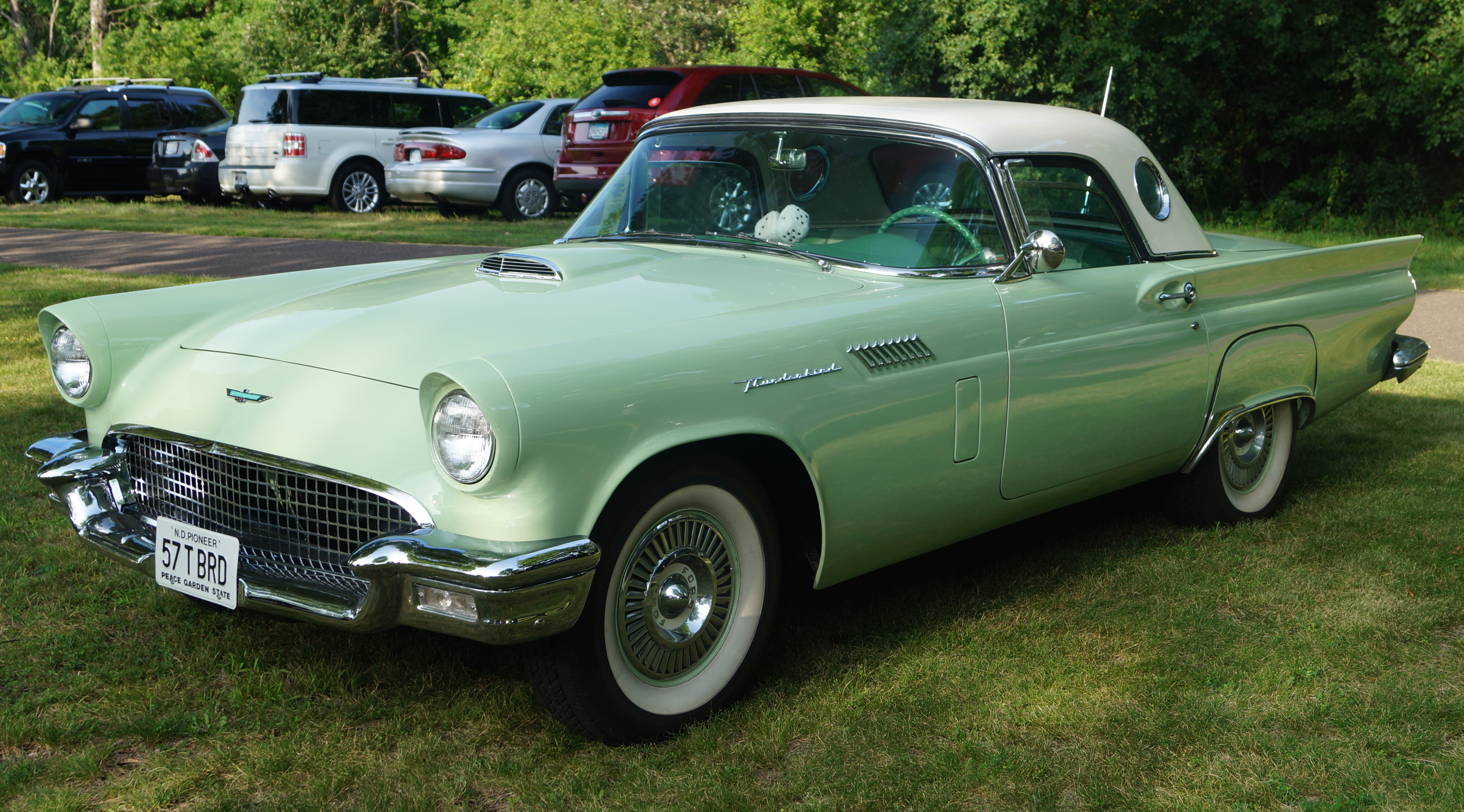
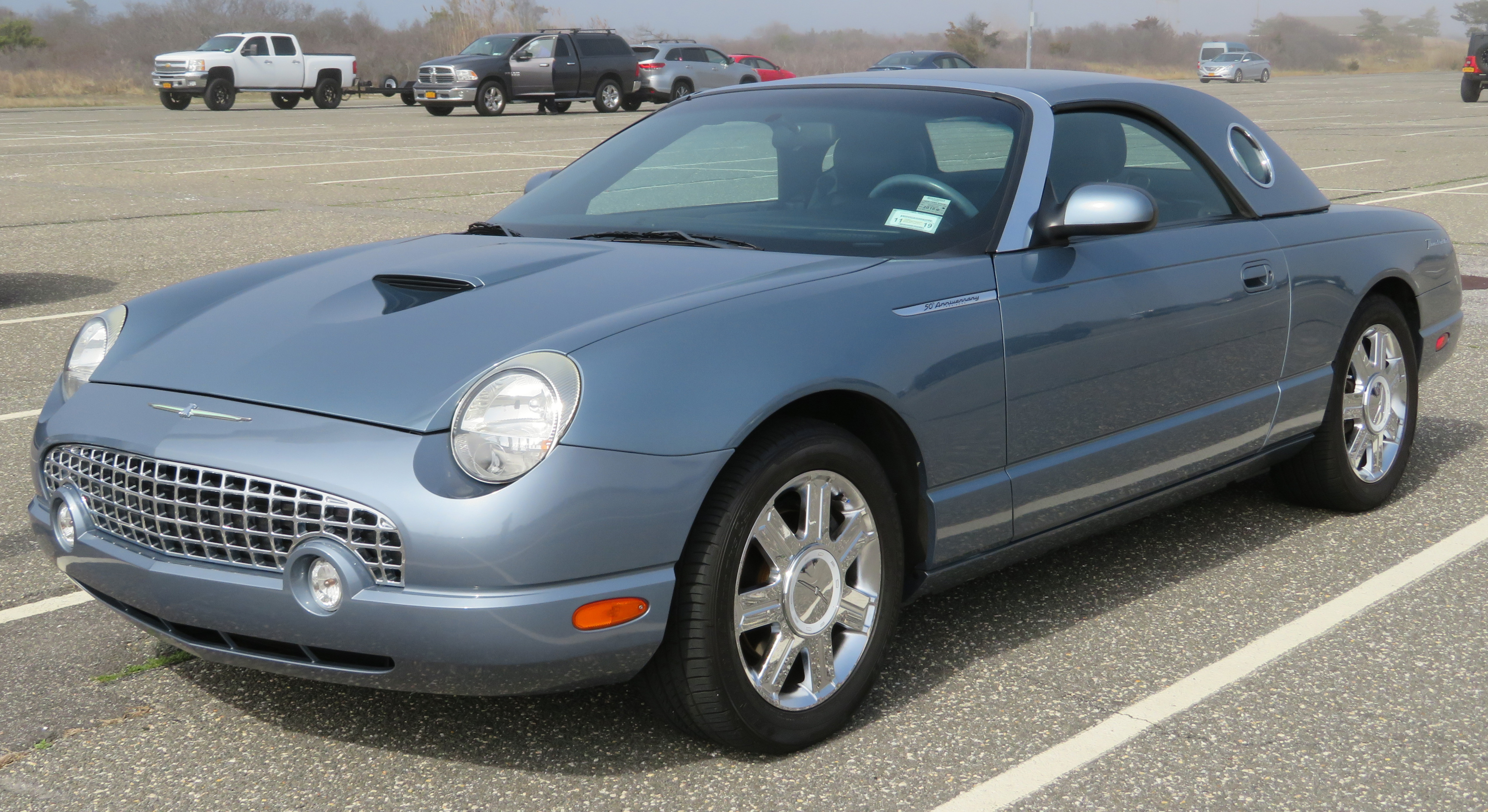
1957 Ford Thunderbird and 2005 Ford Thunderbird
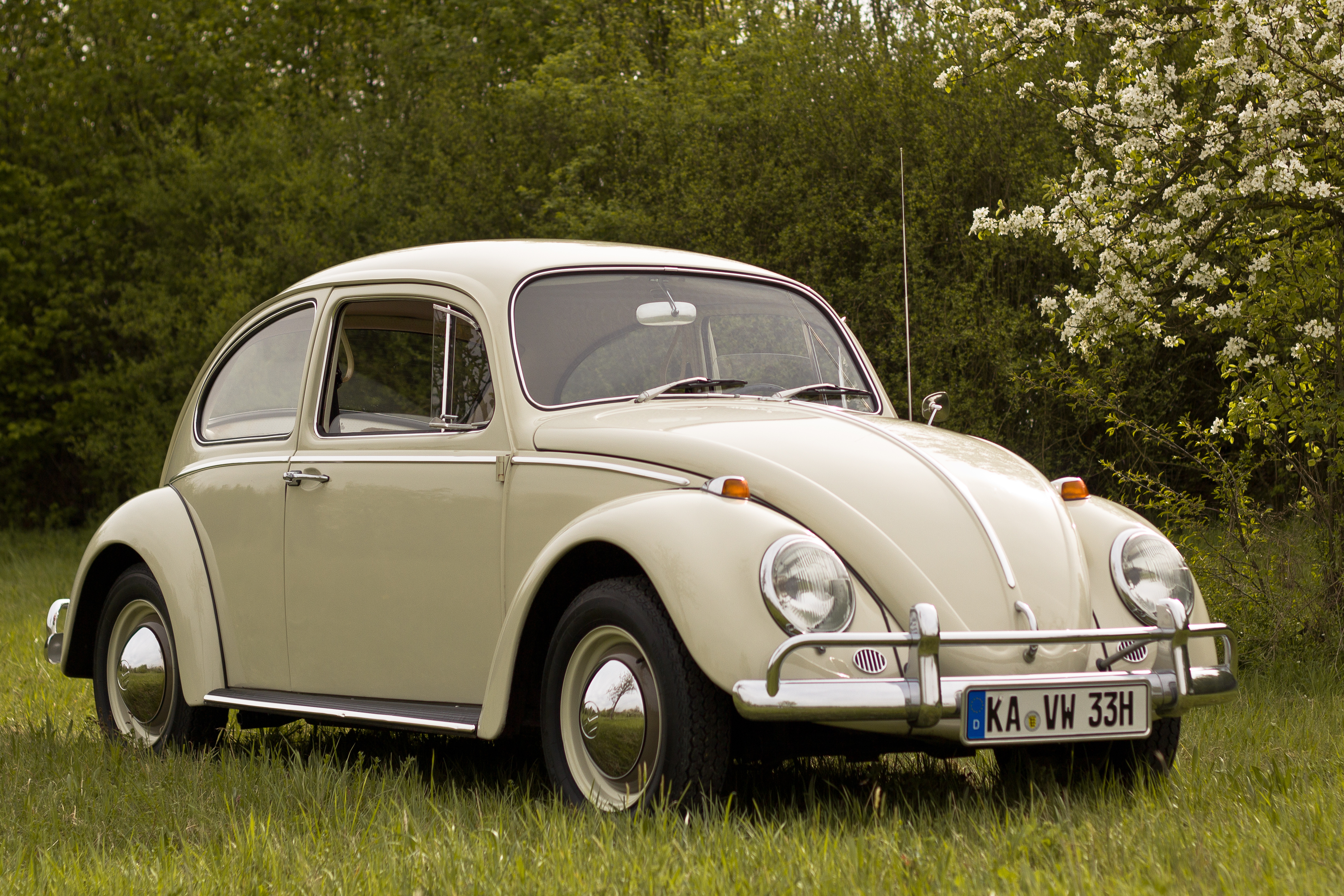
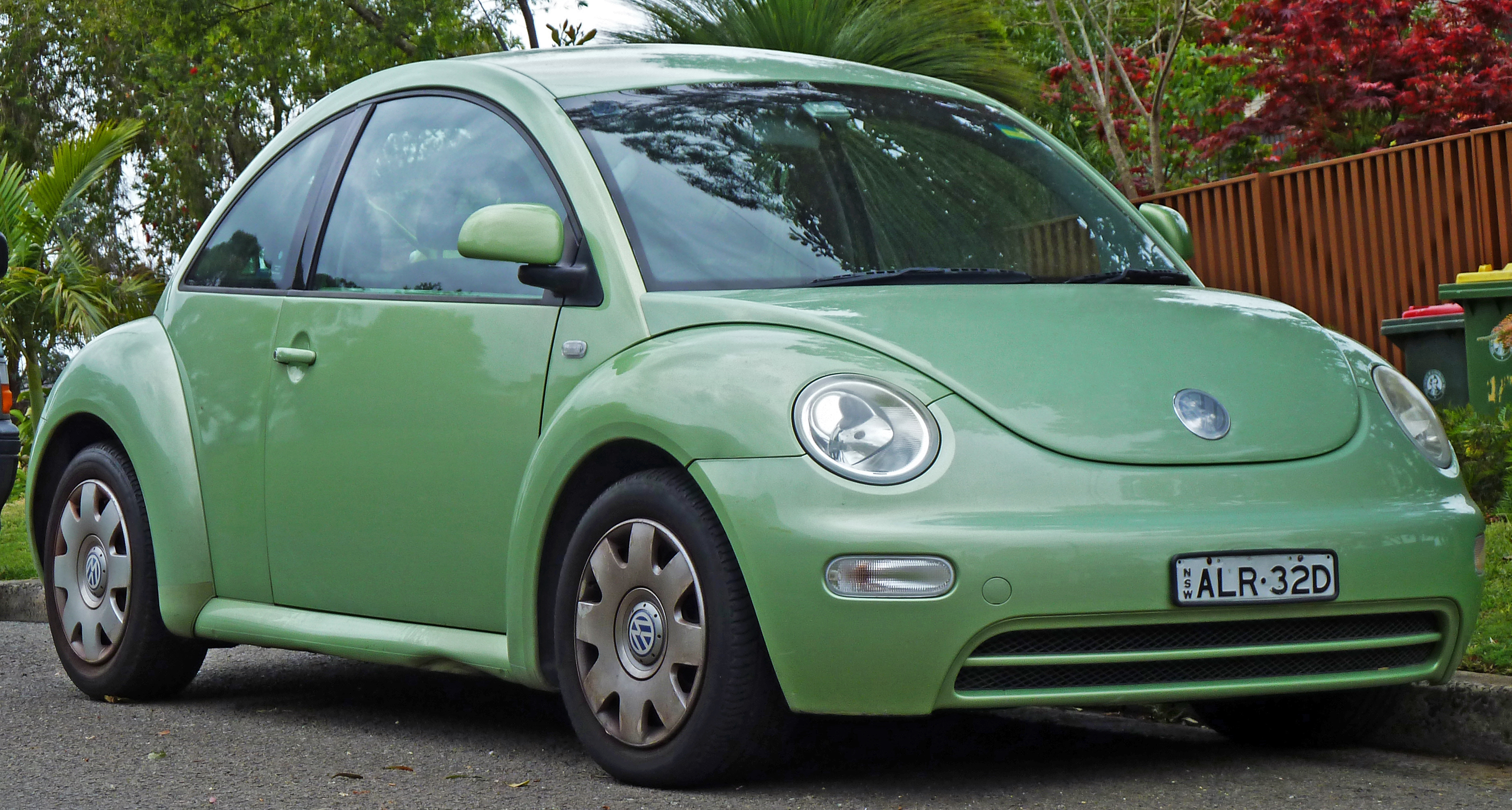
1966 VW Beetle and 2002 VW New Beetle
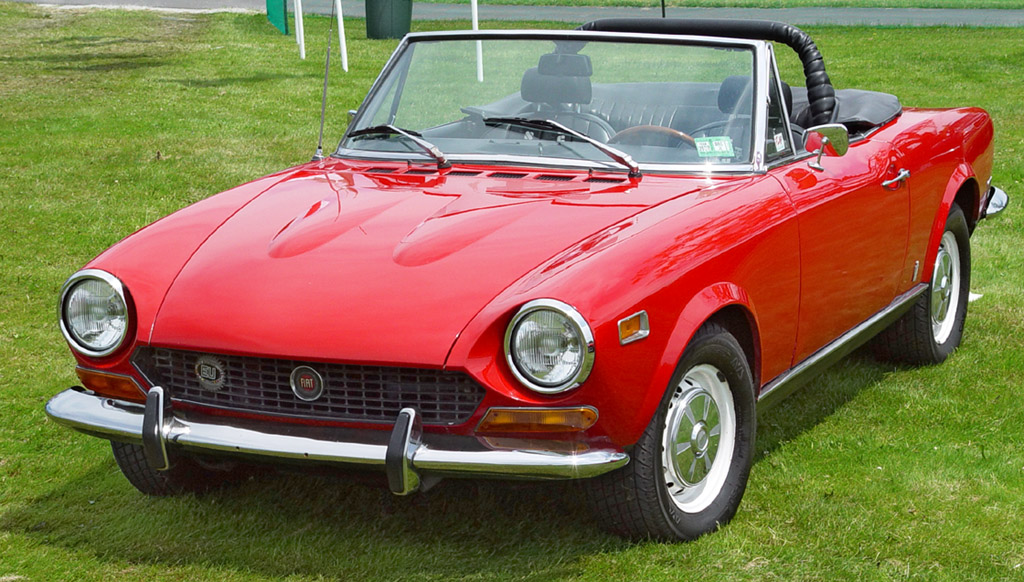
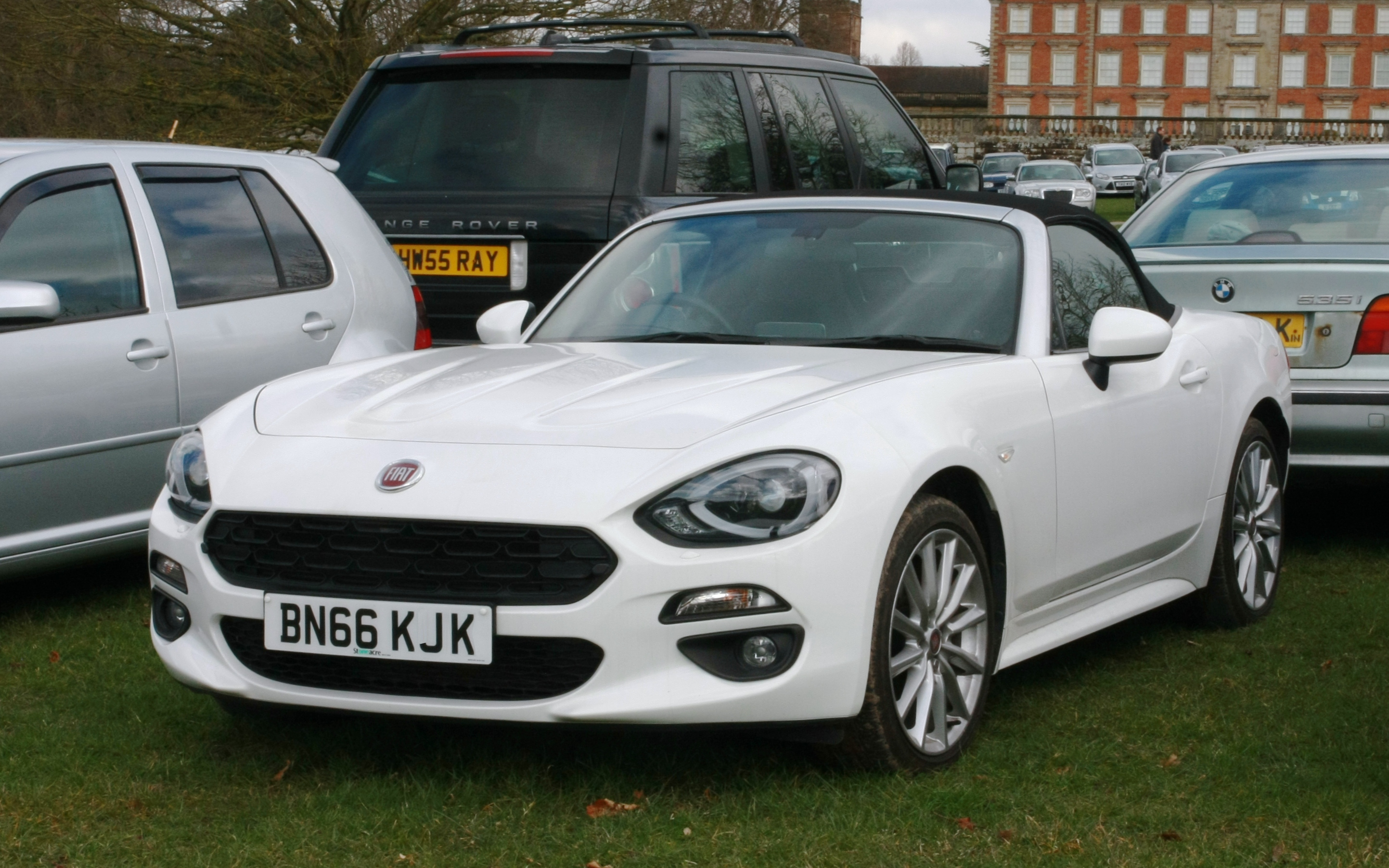
1974 Fiat 124 Sport Spider and 2016 Fiat 124 Spider
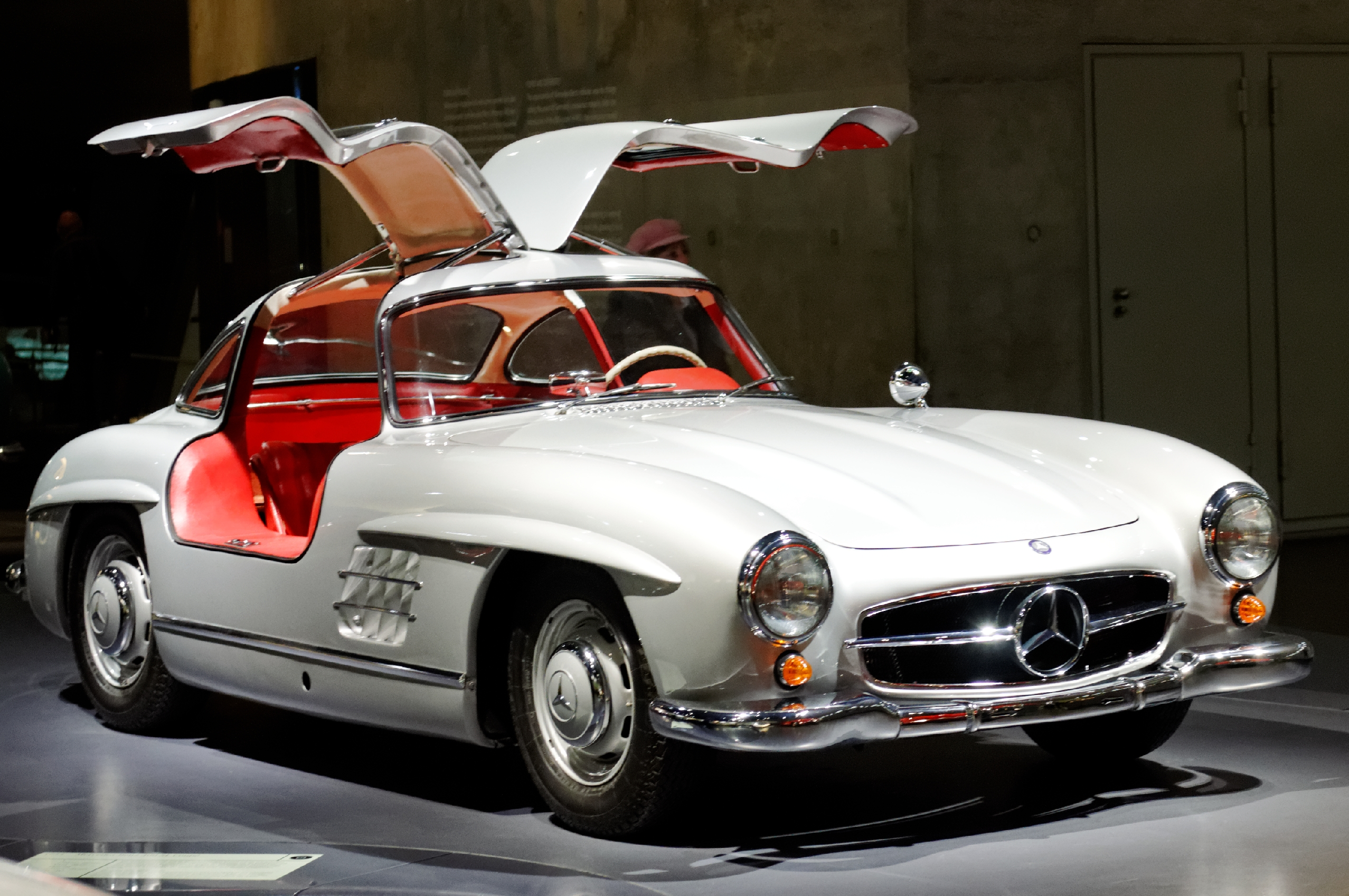
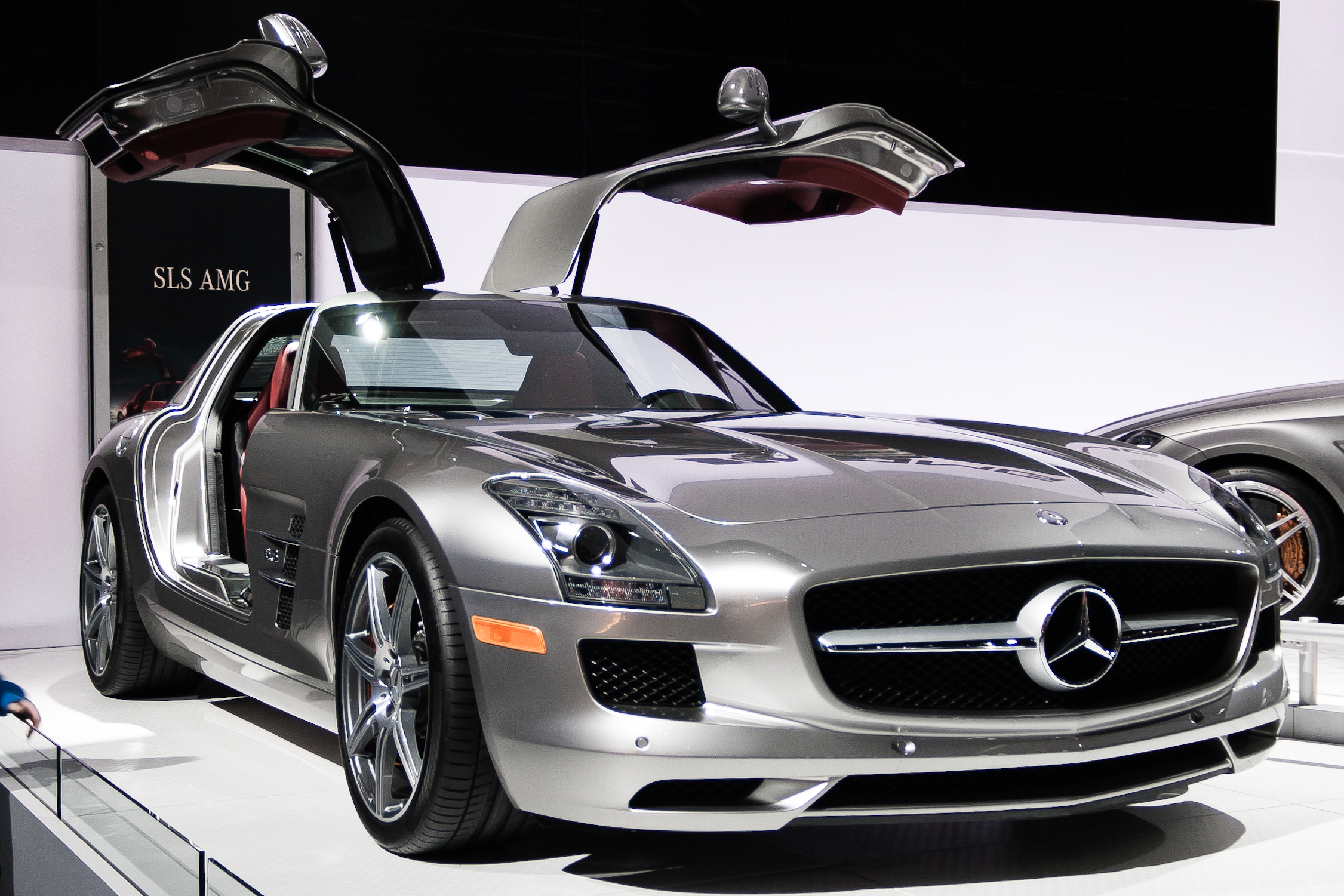
Mercedes-Benz 300 SL and Mercedes-Benz SLS AMG
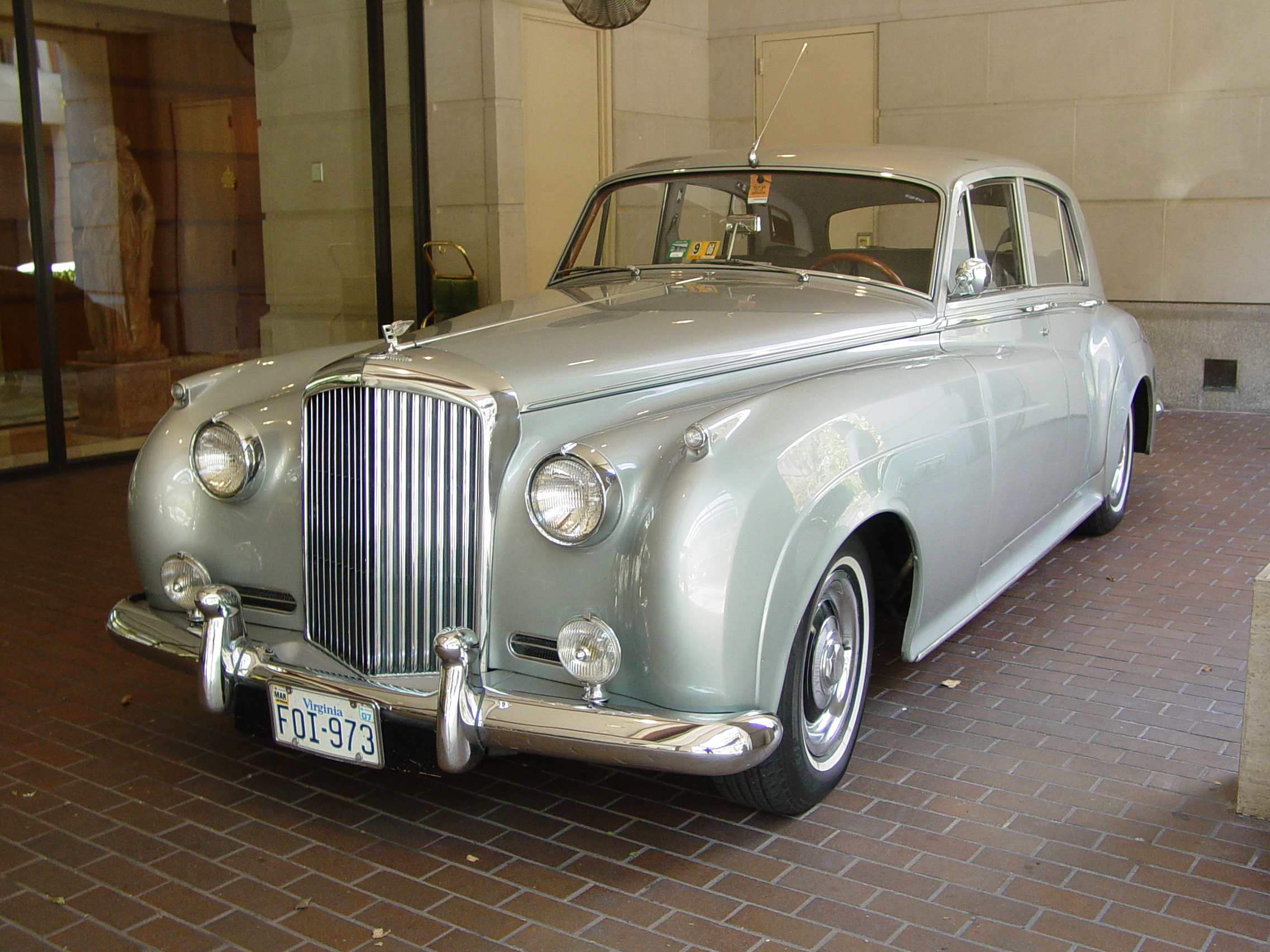
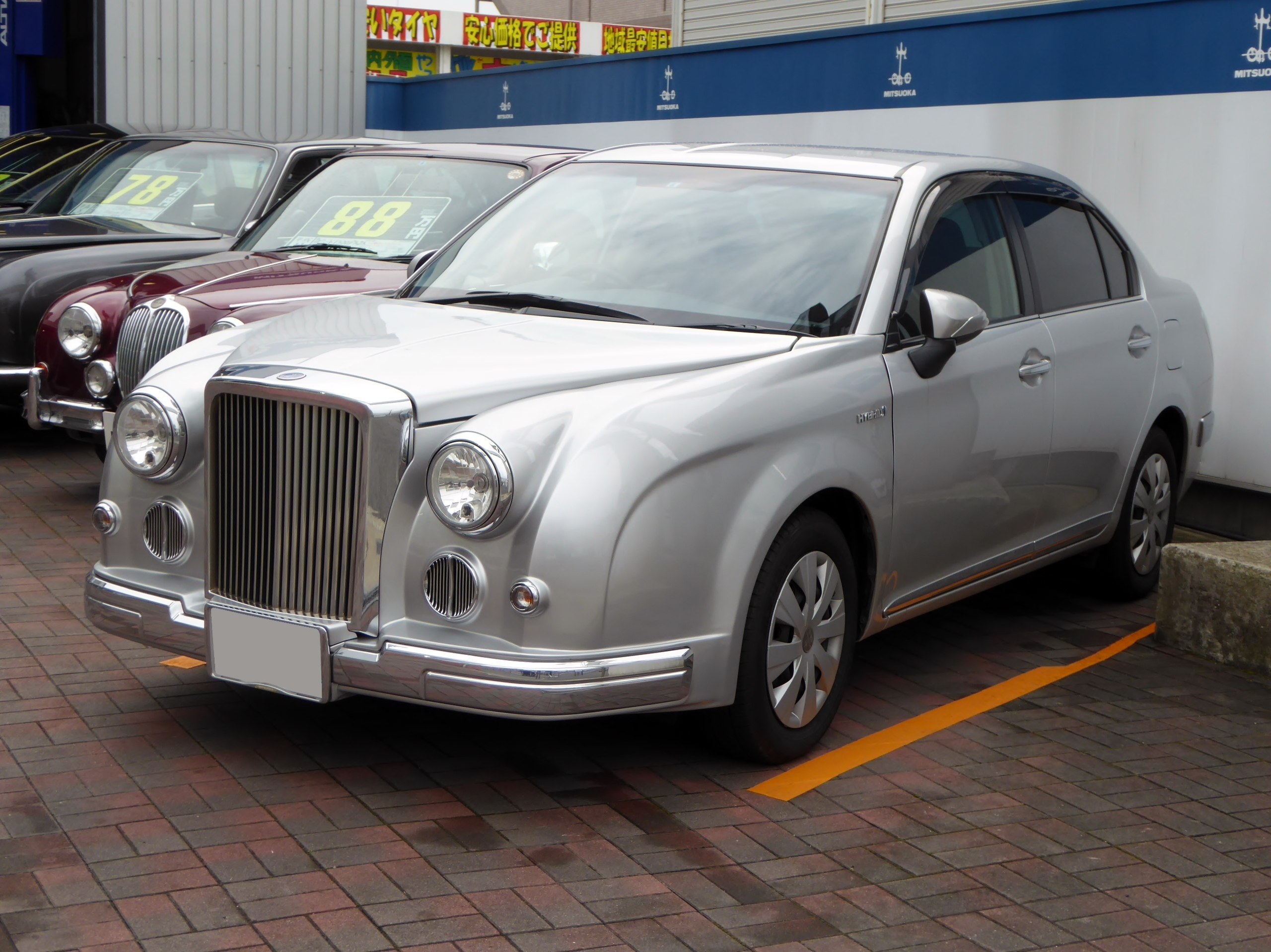
Bentley S2 and Mitsuoka Ryugi
- 1964 Excalibur – 1928 Mercedes-Benz SSK
- 1972 Panther J72 – SS Jaguar 100
- 1974 MP Lafer – 1952 MG TD Midget
- 1974 Panther De Ville
- 1974 Panther FF
- 1976 Panther Lima
- 1980 Cadillac Seville – bustle-back styling from the 1930s-1960s
- 1980 Phillips Berlina – Mercedes-Benz 540K
- 1981 Imperial – bustle-back styling from the 1930s-1960s
- 1982 Lincoln Continental – bustle-back styling from the 1930s-1960s
- 1982 Panther Kallista
- 1983 Evante – Lotus Elan
- 1983 Eniak Antique
- 1987 Nissan Be-1 – the original Mini
- 1989 Nissan Pao – the original Mini
- 1989 Nissan S-Cargo – 1948 Citroën 2CV and snails
- 1991 Nissan Figaro – no direct inspiration
- 1992 Subaru Vivio Bistro – the original Mini
- 1993 Mitsuoka Viewt – 1963 Jaguar Mark 2
- 1993 Wiesmann MF 30 – Jaguar XK140
- 1994 Nissan Rasheen – Wartburg 353
- 1996 Mitsuoka Galue
- 1996 Toyota Classic – Toyota AA
- 1997 Plymouth Prowler – hot rods based on 1930s cars
- 1998 GAZ-3111 Volga – 1962 GAZ-21 Volga
- 1998 Rover 75 – 1950s Rover P4
- 1998 Volkswagen New Beetle – 1938 Volkswagen Type 1 "Beetle"
- 1999 Daihatsu Mira Gino – Mini
- 2000 BMW Z8 – 1956 BMW 507
- 2000 Jaguar S-Type – 1960s Jaguar S-Type
- 2000 Toyota Origin – 1955 Toyota Crown
- 2001 MINI – 1959 BMC Mini
- 2001 Morgan Aero 8
- 2001 Chrysler PT Cruiser – Chevrolet Advance Design and Chrysler Airflow
- 2001 Devaux Coupe
- 2002 Ford Thunderbird – 1955–1957 Ford Thunderbird
- 2002 Hummer H2 – Humvee
- 2002 Suzuki Lapin
- 2003 Chevrolet SSR – Chevrolet Advance Design
- 2004 Chrysler Crossfire
- 2004 Ford GT – 1964 Ford GT40
- 2004 Morgan Roadster
- 2005 Ford Mustang – 1965 Ford Mustang
- 2006 Chevrolet HHR – 1940s Chevrolet Suburban
- 2006 Hummer H3 – Humvee
- 2007 Fiat 500 – 1957 Fiat 500
- 2007 Ruf CTR3 – 1950s and 1960s LeMans race cars
- 2007 Toyota FJ Cruiser – 1960 Toyota FJ40 Land Cruiser
- 2008 Dodge Challenger – 1970 Dodge Challenger
- 2009 AC MK VI – 1963 AC Cobra
- 2009 Daihatsu Mira Cocoa
- 2010 Chevrolet Camaro – 1967 Chevrolet Camaro
- 2010 Mercedes-Benz SLS AMG – Mercedes-Benz 300 SL
- 2010 Mitsuoka Himiko – Jaguar XK120 and others
- 2011 Volkswagen Beetle – 1938 Volkswagen Type 1 "Beetle"
- 2011 Ferrari FF and 2016 Ferrari GTC4Lusso – 1962 Ferrari 250 GT SWB Breadvan
- 2012 Honda N-One – Honda N360
- 2012 Morgan 3-Wheeler
- 2014 Hongqi L5 – Hongqi CA770
- 2016 Fiat 124 Spider – Fiat 124 Sport Spider
- 2016 Daihatsu Move Canbus
- 2017 Alpine A110 – Alpine A110
- 2018 Ruf SCR 2018 – Ruf SCR and Porsche 964
- 2018 Toyota Century – Toyota Century (G20/G30/G40)
- 2018 Daihatsu Mira Tocot
- 2019 Ares Design Progettouno – De Tomaso Pantera
- 2020 Honda e – 1972 Honda Civic
- 2020 Fiat 500e – 1957 Fiat 500
- 2020 Citroën C4 – Citroën GS
- 2021 Ford Bronco – 1966 Ford Bronco
- 2021 Hyundai Ioniq 5 – 1975 Hyundai Pony
- 2022 Volkswagen ID. Buzz – 1950 Volkswagen Type 2
- 2022 Lamborghini Countach LPI 800-4 – 1974 Lamborghini Countach: shares the platform with the Aventador.
- 2023 Nissan Z (RZ34) – 1969 Nissan Fairlady Z and Nissan Z32
- 2023 Hyundai Santa Fe (MX5) – 1991 Hyundai Galloper
- 2023 LUAZ Farmer – 1979 LuAZ-969M
- 2024 Renault 5 E-Tech – 1974 Renault 5
- 2025 Renault 4 E-Tech – 1961 Renault 4
- 2026 Renault Twingo E-Tech – 1993 Renault Twingo
- 2026 McLaren McL 6GT – 1960 McLaren M6GT

=== Concept cars ===
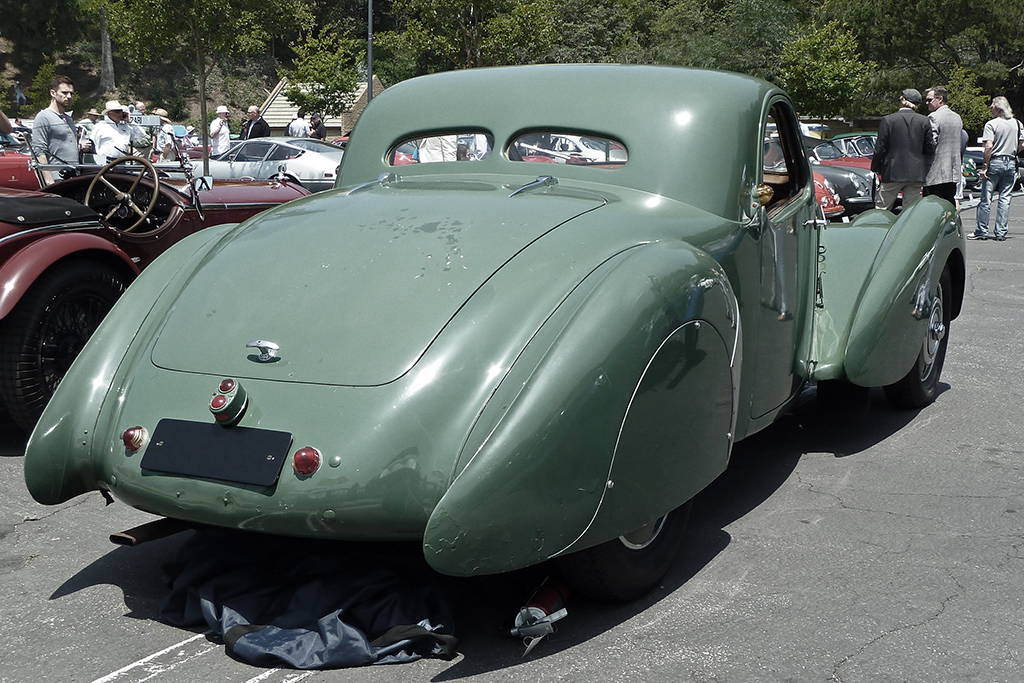
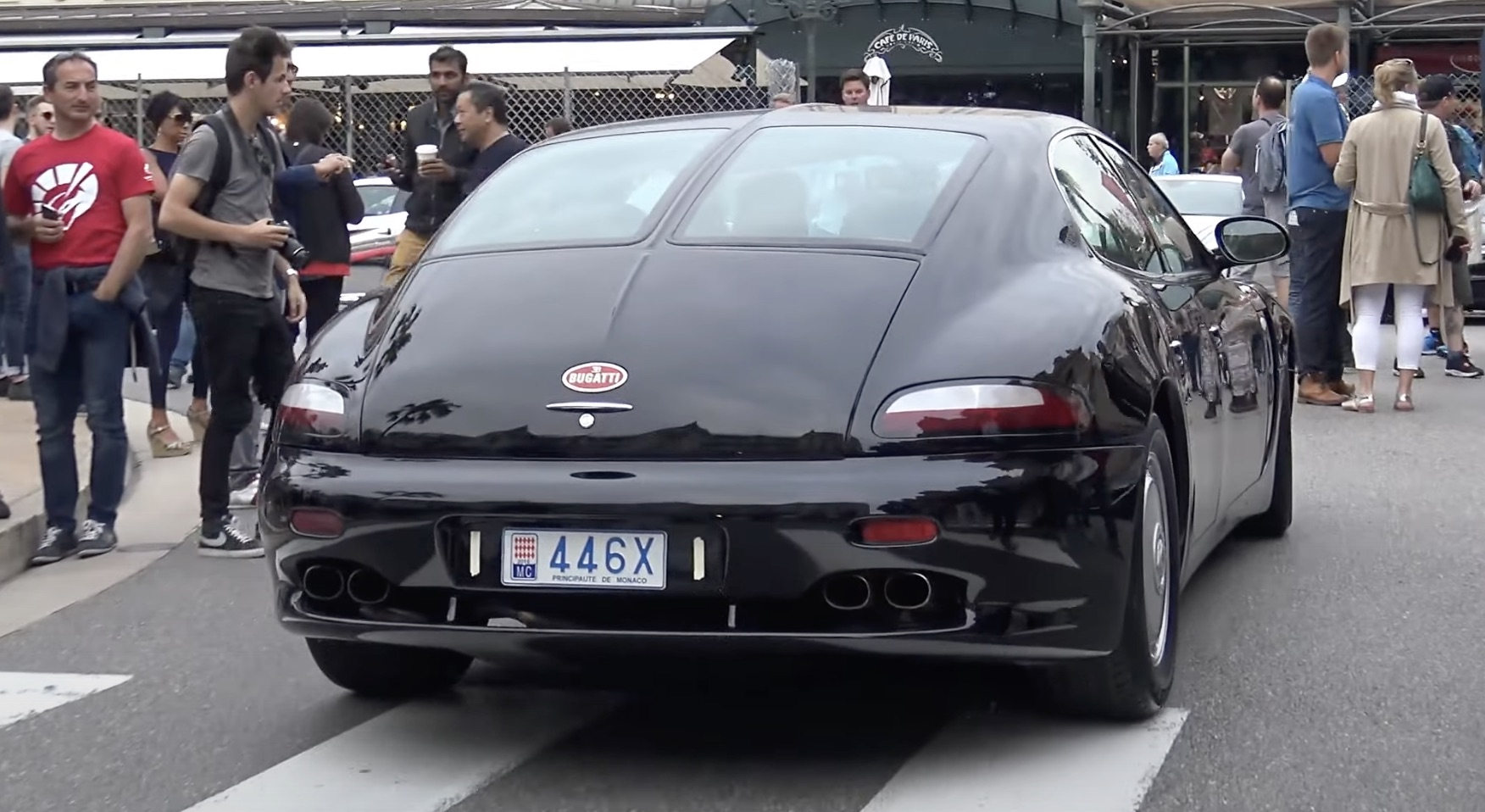
Bugatti EB 112 and Bugatti Type 57
- 1993 Bugatti EB 112 – Bugatti Type 57
- 1995 Chrysler Atlantic – 1930s Bugatti Type 57 and Talbot-Lago T150 SS
- 1997 Plymouth Pronto
- 1998 Chrysler Chronos – 1953 Chrysler D'Elegance concept
- 1998 Bugatti EB 118 – Bugatti Type 50 and Type 57
- 1999 Bugatti EB 218 – Bugatti Type 101
- 1999 Dodge Charger R/T – 1960s Dodge Charger
- 1999 Nissan 240Z concept – 1969 Datsun 240Z: designed in 12 weeks but criticisms of the retro styling prompted a redesign.
- 1999 Plymouth Howler
- 2000 Audi Rosemeyer – 1936 Auto Union Type C racing car
- 2000 GAZ 2169 Kombat – 1953 GAZ-69
- 2001 Buick Blackhawk – 1938 Buick Y-Job concept
- 2001 Ford Forty-Nine – 1949 Ford
- 2001 Volkswagen Microbus Concept – 1950 Volkswagen Type 2
- 2002 ZAZ Zaporozhets – 1960 ZAZ-965 Zaporozhets
- 2004 Fiat Trepiùno – Fiat 500
- 2005 Holden Efijy – Holden FJ
- 2005 Volvo T6 – hot rods based on 1930s cars
- 2006 Lamborghini Concept M – 1966 Lamborghini Miura
- 2006 Russo-Baltique Impression – 1913 Russo-Balt C24/58
- 2008 Scion Hako Coupe
- 2009 Bugatti 16C Galibier – Bugatti Type 57
- 2009 Morgan LIFEcar
- 2009 Trabant nT – Trabant 601
- 2010 Morgan Eva GT
- 2011 Citroën Tubik – Citroën Type H
- 2013 Nissan IDx – 1968 Datsun 510
- 2015 Toyota Tacoma Back to the Future Concept – 1985 Toyota pickup
- 2017 Volkswagen I.D. Buzz – 1950 Volkswagen Type 2
- 2019 Morris Commercial JE – 1949 Morris Commercial J-type
- 2021 ArtTech MARTT – 1947 Moskvitch 400-420
- 2021 Renault 5 E-Tech – 1974 Renault 5
- 2022 Hyundai N Vision 74 – 1974 Hyundai Pony Coupe concept
- 2024 Koenigsegg CC850 – Designed to celebrate the 20th anniversary of Koenigsegg's first production car, the CC8S. It pays homage to that car with various exterior design similarities.
- 2025 Lada T-134 – 1977 VAZ-2121 Niva

== See also ==
- Retro style
