= Buick Blackhawk =

Concept car developed by Buick

Overview
- Manufacturer: Buick (General Motors)
- Designer: Steven D. Pasteiner

Body and chassis
- Class: Retro-style
- Body style: 2-door, 4-seat convertible sedan

Powertrain
- Engine: 7.5l Buick GS Stage III V8 (463 hp)
- Transmission: 4-speed automatic

The Buick Blackhawk is a retro concept 2+2 convertible built by Buick in 2000 for the Centennial of Buick in 2003. Its grille is based on 1939 Buick automobiles and the Buick Y-Job concept car, while its main body is based on the 1941 Buick Roadmaster coupe. It features a retractable hardtop, shaved door handles, and hidden headlights.

The Blackhawk is powered by a 1970 455-in³ (7.5-L) Buick GS Stage III V8, producing 463 hp (345 kW) at 4600 rpm and 510 lb⋅ft (690 N⋅m) of torque at 4200 rpm and accelerating the car from 0–60 mph (0–97 km/h) in under five seconds. The engine is mated to an electronically controlled four-speed automatic transmission.

The vehicle is entirely handmade in steel using some original Buick sheetmetal from the 1940's, including the carbon-fiber top and the frame. The retraction system is also handmade. The Buick Blackhawk also features a fully independent suspension, keyless entry, and dual exhaust with 3 in (7.6 cm) pipes. The vehicle also has 18 in (46 cm) five-spoke alloy wheels with high-speed Z-rated tires. The interior is based on the 1996 Buick Riviera.

The car was featured in the film Bad Boys II. It was driven by actor Will Smith after the mortuary scene.

On January 17, 2009, it was sold for $522,500 (including buyer premium) by Barrett-Jackson .
