= Harley Earl =

American designer (1893–1969)

- Born: Harley Jarvis Earl; November 22, 1893; Hollywood, California, United States
- Died: April 10, 1969 (aged 75); West Palm Beach, Florida, United States
- Occupations: Automotive designer and executive
- Known for: First head of design at General Motors; Innovations in automotive design

Harley Jarvis Earl (November 22, 1893 – April 10, 1969) was an American automotive designer and business executive. He was the initial designated head of design at General Motors, later becoming vice president, the first top executive of a major corporation after previously working as a designer. He was an industrial designer and a pioneer of transportation design. A coachbuilder by trade, Earl pioneered the use of freeform sketching and hand sculpted clay models as automotive design techniques. He subsequently introduced the "concept car" as both a tool for the design process and a marketing device.

Earl's Buick Y-Job was the first concept car. He started "Project Opel", which eventually became the Chevrolet Corvette, and he authorized the introduction of the tailfin to automotive styling. During World War II, he was an active contributor to the Allies' research and development program in advancing the effectiveness of camouflage.

== Early life ==
Harley Jarvis Earl was born in Hollywood, California. His father, J.W. Earl, began work as a coachbuilder in 1889. The senior Earl eventually changed his practice from horse-drawn vehicles to custom bodies and customized parts and accessories for automobiles, founding Earl Automobile Works in 1908.

Earl began studies at Stanford University, but left prematurely to work with, and learn from, his father at Earl Automotive Works. By this time, the shop was building custom bodies for Hollywood movie stars, including Roscoe "Fatty" Arbuckle and Tom Mix.

== General Motors ==
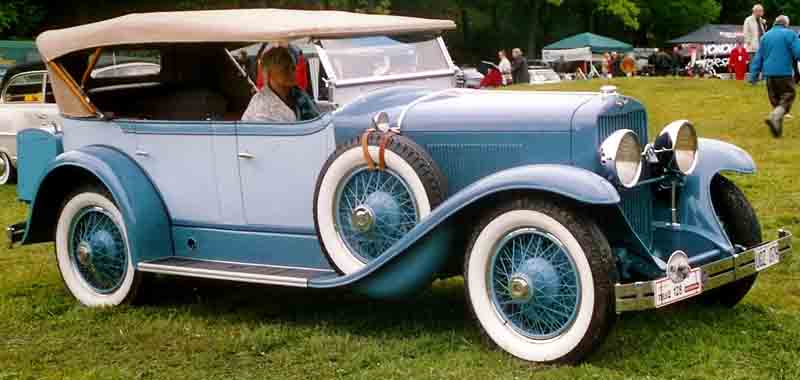
1928 LaSalle phaeton

Earl Automotive Works was bought by Cadillac dealer Don Lee, who kept Harley Earl as director of its custom body shop.

Lawrence P. Fisher, general manager of the Cadillac division who was one of the brothers who started Fisher Body, was visiting Cadillac dealers and distributors around the country, including Lee. Fisher met Earl at Lee's dealership and observed him at work. Fisher, whose automotive career began with coachbuilder Fisher Body, was impressed with Earl's designs and methods, including the use of modeling clay to develop the forms of his designs.

Fisher commissioned Earl to design the 1927 LaSalle for Cadillac's companion marque. The success of the LaSalle convinced General Motors president Alfred P. Sloan to create the “Art and Colour Section” of General Motors, and to name Earl as its first director.

Prior to the establishment of the "Art and Colour Section", American automobile manufacturers did not assign any great importance to the appearance of automobile bodies. Volume manufacturers built bodies designed by engineers, guided only by functionality and cost. Many luxury-car manufacturers, including GM, did not make bodies at all, opting instead to ship chassis assemblies to a coachbuilder of the buyer's choice.

The executives at General Motors at the time, including engineers, division heads, and sales executives, viewed Earl's conceptual ideas as flamboyant and unfounded. Earl struggled to legitimize his design approach against the tradition- and production-oriented executives. As head of the newly formed "Art and Colour Section" in 1927, he was initially referred to as one of the "pretty picture boys", and his design studio as being the "Beauty Parlor".

In 1937, the "Art and Colour Section" was renamed the Styling Section. Sloan eventually promoted Earl to vice president, making him, to the best of Sloan's knowledge, the first styling person to be a VP at a large corporation. After the early 1930s, Earl seldom drew sketches or did design work himself, usually functioning as an overlord who supervised GM stylists, although he would retain ultimate authority over the styling department until his retirement in 1958.

Harley Earl and Sloan implemented "Dynamic Obsolescence" (essentially synonymous with planned obsolescence) and the "Annual Model Change", tying model identity to a specific year, to further position design as a driver for the company's product success. At the same time, Earl was careful to not depart too radically from the previous year's styling to maintain a semblance of continuity. This practice also ensured that used GM cars had the highest resale values of any American automotive make. Earl also avoided extreme or radical styling choices that would become dated quickly and alienate conservative-minded customers. These ideas are largely taken for granted today, but were unusual at the time.

=== Buick Y-Job ===
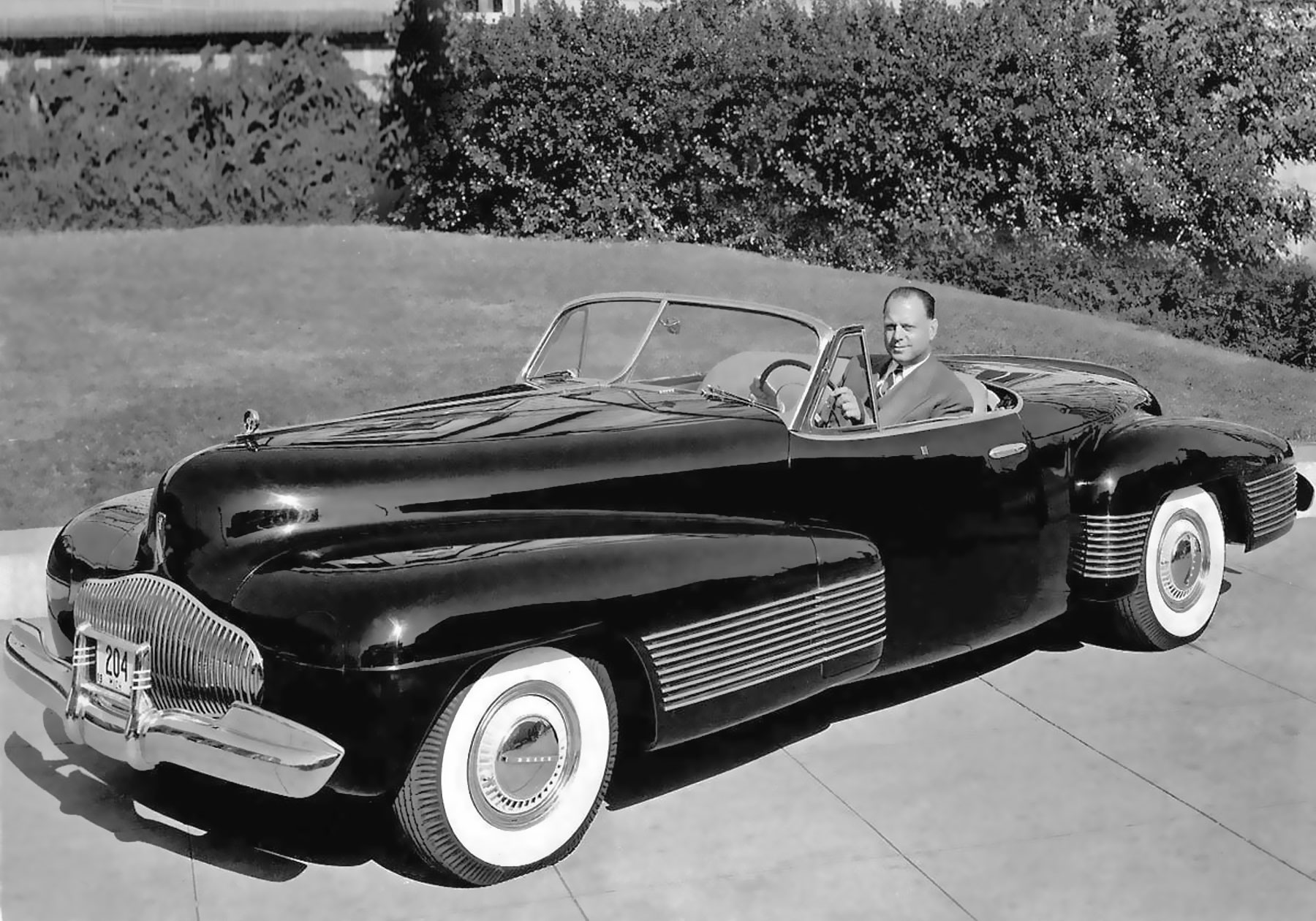
Harley Earl and the Buick Y-Job

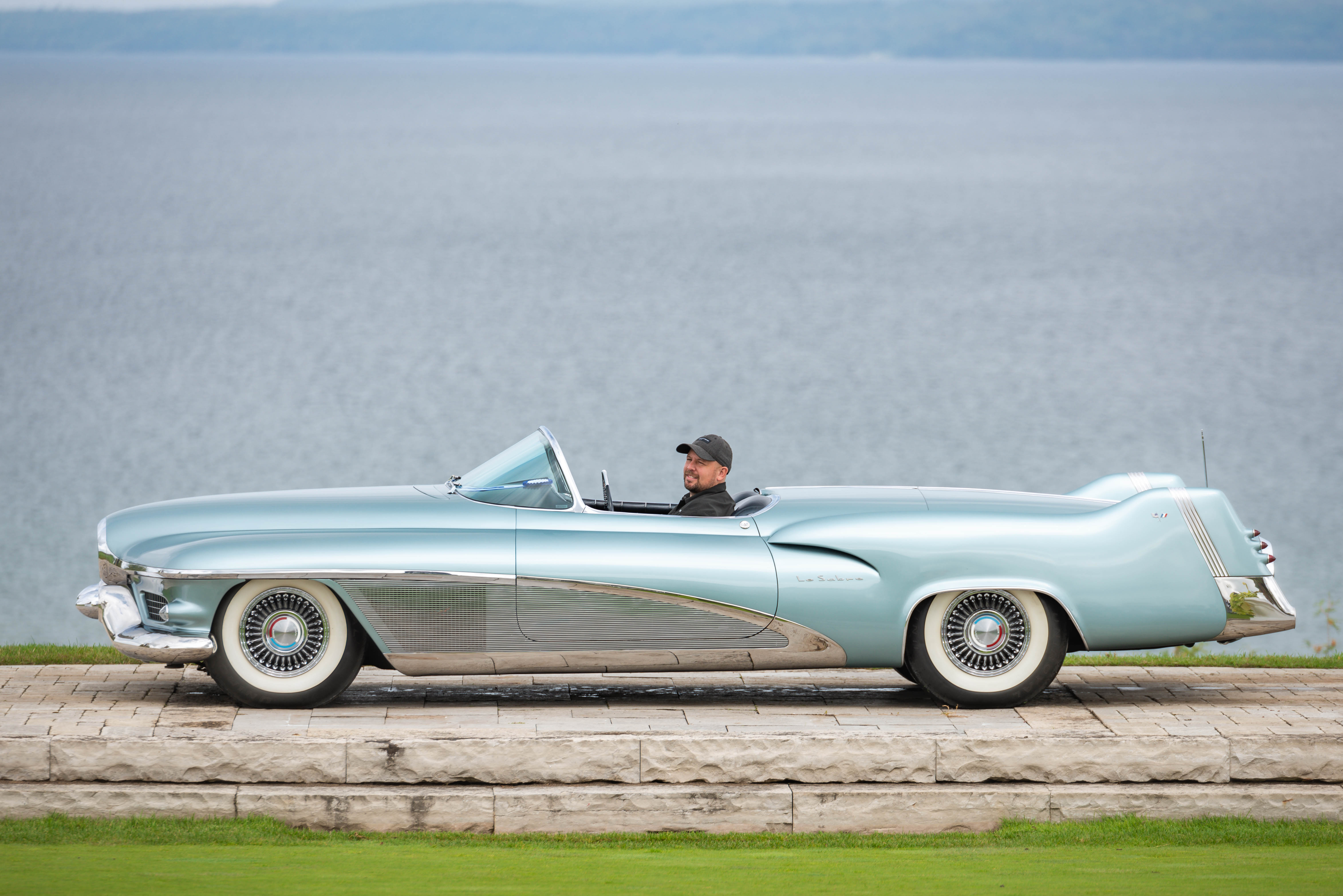
1951 General Motors Le Sabre

In 1939, the Styling Division, under Earl's instruction, styled and built the Buick Y-Job, the motor industry's first concept car. While many one-off custom automobiles had been made before, the Y-job was the first car built by a mass manufacturer for the sole purpose of determining the public's reaction to new design ideas. After being shown to the public, the Y-job became Earl's daily driver. It was succeeded by the 1951 General Motors Le Sabre concept car.

=== Camouflage research ===
In 1942, during World War II, Earl established a camouflage research and training division at General Motors, one consequence of which was a 22-page document called Camouflage Manual for General Motors Camouflage. A decade before, two former World War I camouflage artists, Harold Ledyard Towle (a U.S. Army camoufleur) and McClelland Barclay (who created the Fisher Body ads, and contributed to U.S. Navy camouflage during both World Wars) had worked as designers at General Motors. Among Earl's apprentices was English designer David Jones, who worked at its British division at Vauxhall Motors and served in the camouflage section of the Royal Engineers during World War II.

=== Tailfins ===
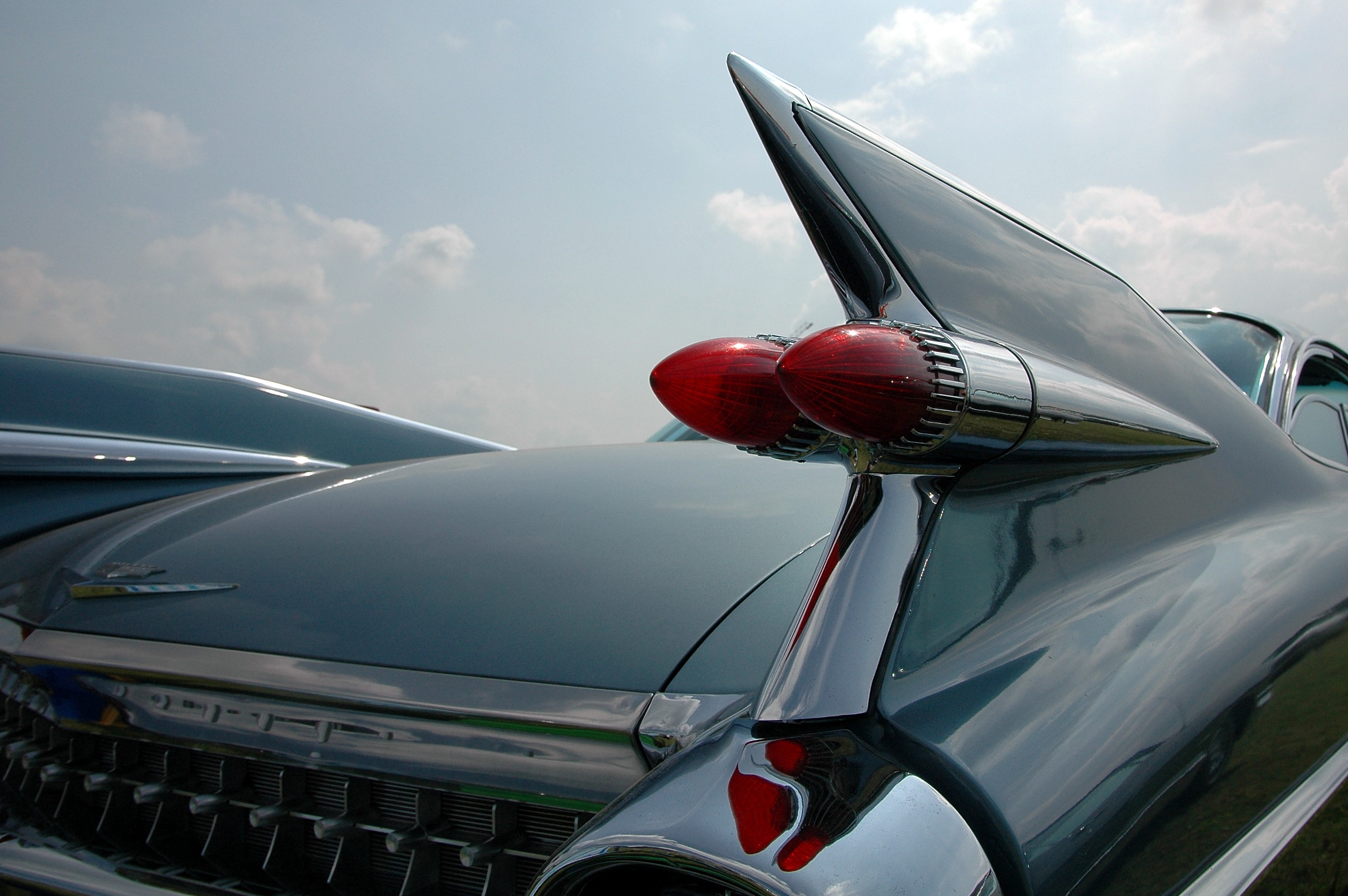
1959 Cadillac tailfin

Harley Earl authorized the Frank Hershey design for the 1948 Cadillac, which incorporated the first automotive tailfin. Many of the new 1948-49 cars such as Hudson, Nash, and Lincoln adopted fastback or ponton "bathtub" styling. Although Earl considered this for Cadillac, he ultimately decided against it and went for a more sweeping aircraft-inspired look. This decision would prove a wise one as bathtub styling, a concept rooted in late 1930s-early 1940s design trends, quickly became dated. The styling of the 1948 Cadillac would prove far more predictive of 1950s trends and secured GM's place at the cutting edge of automotive design.

Inspiration for the fins came from the Lockheed P-38 Lightning, but it extended beyond the war, during the age when space rockets captured the popular imagination in the 1950s and 1960s. The style caught on throughout Detroit and eventually led to competition between Harley Earl and his counterpart at Chrysler, Virgil Exner, over the size and complexity of tailfins, culminating with those on the 1959 Cadillac models.

=== Chevrolet Corvette ===
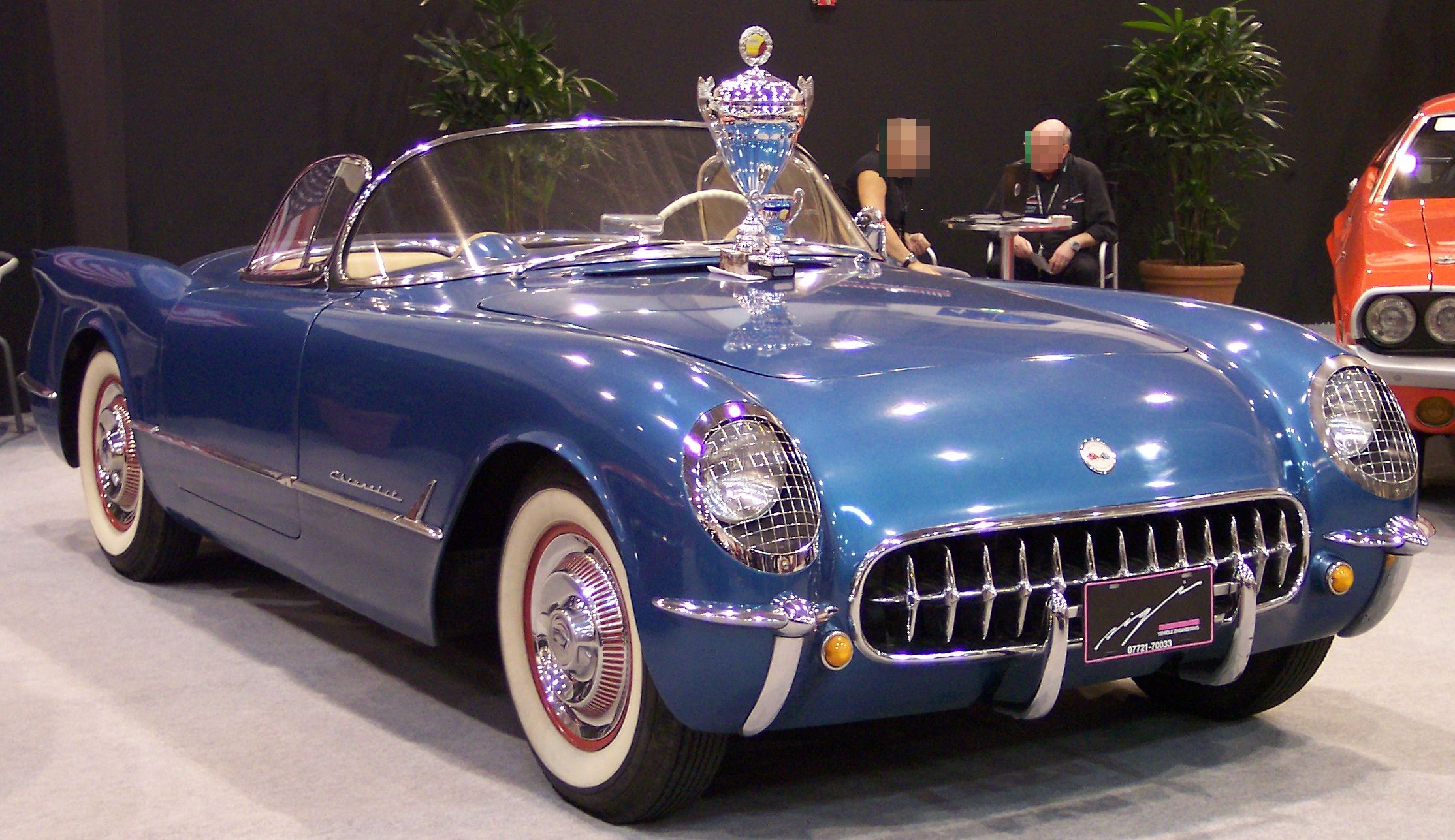
Chevrolet Corvette

Influenced by the English and European sports cars being raced on road racing circuits after World War II, Earl decided that General Motors needed to make a sports car. Design work on "Project Opel" began as a secret project. He first offered the project to Chevrolet general manager Ed Cole. Cole accepted the project without hesitation, and the car was offered to the public in 1953 as the Chevrolet Corvette.

=== Succession ===
Earl retired in 1958 upon reaching the then-mandatory retirement age of 65. His final project was overseeing the design of 1960–62 models. He was succeeded as vice-president with responsibility for the Design and Styling Department by Bill Mitchell, under whose leadership GM design became less ornamental.

Before Earl retired, General Motors became the largest corporation in the world, and design was acknowledged as the leading sales factor within the automotive industry.

== Death and legacy ==
Harley Earl suffered a stroke and died in West Palm Beach, Florida, on April 10, 1969. He was 75 years old.

He is remembered as the first styling chief in the United States automobile industry, the originator of clay modeling of automotive designs, the wraparound windshield, the hardtop sedan, factory two-tone paint, and tailfins. He said in 1954, "My primary purpose for twenty-eight years has been to lengthen and lower the American automobile, at times in reality and always at least in appearance." The extremely low and long American cars of the 1960s and 1970s show the extent to which Earl influenced an entire industry and culture.

He was inducted into the Automotive Hall of Fame in 1986.

One of his concept car designs, the turbine-powered Firebird I, is reproduced in miniature on the Harley J. Earl Trophy, which goes to the winner of the season-opening Daytona 500 NASCAR race.

Harley Earl was used in a brief advertising campaign for Buick, particularly during its reconstruction period between 2001 and 2002. Actor John Diehl, portraying Earl (or his ghost) was used to symbolize the importance of design in Buick's cars, or as the advertisements put it, the "Spirit of American Style". A fedora was often used as an Earl icon in these advertisements.

In a December 1999 special section in the Detroit Free Press, Earl was ranked the third most significant Michigan artist of the 20th century, behind Aretha Franklin and Stevie Wonder.

== See also ==
- NASCAR National Commissioner
- 1950s American automobile culture

== Bibliography ==
- Sloan, Alfred P. (1964), McDonald, John (ed.), My Years with General Motors, Garden City, NY, US: Doubleday, LCCN 64011306, OCLC 802024. Republished in 1990 with a new introduction by Peter Drucker (ISBN 978-0385042352).
- Gartman, David (1994), “Harley Earl and the Art and colour Section: The Birth of Styling at General Motors,” Design Issues vol. 10, no. 2, pages 3–26
- Temple, David (2016), The Cars of Harley Earl, Forest Lake, MN, USA: CarTech Inc., 919860192. ISBN 9781613252345
