= Buick Y-Job =

Concept car developed by Buick

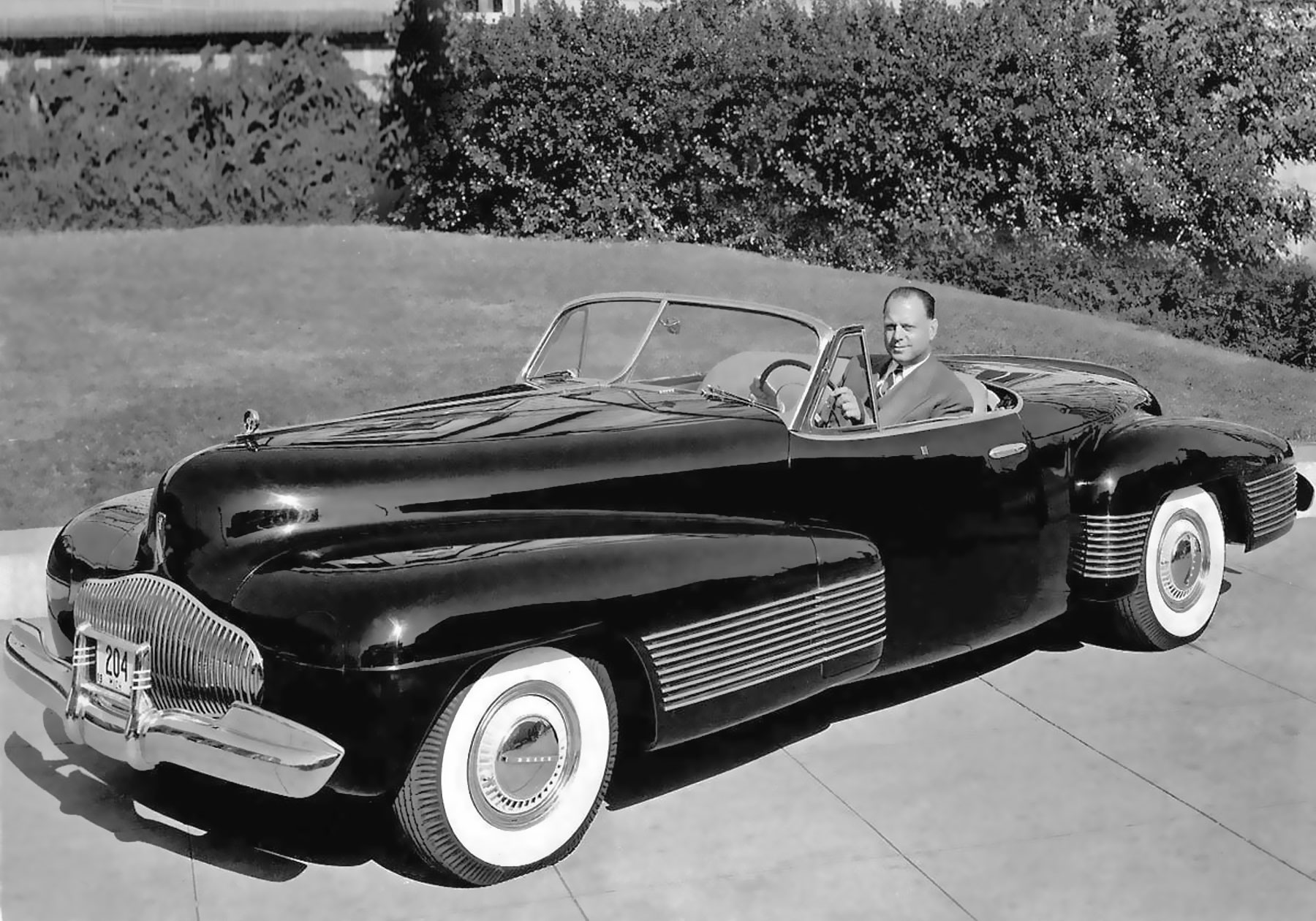
- Harley Earl in the Buick Y-Job, 1939

Overview
- Manufacturer: Buick (General Motors)
- Model years: 1938
- Designer: Harley Earl

Body and chassis
- Class: Concept car
- Body style: 2-door convertible coupe

Powertrain
- Engine: 5.2-liter (320 ci) Buick straight-8

Dimensions
- Wheelbase: 126 in (3,200 mm)
- Length: 208.7 in (5,301 mm)

The Buick Y-Job was a convertible car developed by American manufacturer Buick in 1938. It was the auto industry's first concept car, a model intended to show new technology or designs but not be mass-produced for sale to consumers. Designed by Harley Earl, the car had power-operated hidden headlamps, a "gunsight" hood ornament, electric windows, wraparound bumpers, flush door handles, and prefigured styling cues used by Buick until the 1950s and the vertical waterfall grille design still used by Buick today. It used a Buick Super chassis, indicated by the word "Super" located above the rear license plate.

The car was driven for a number of years by Harley Earl, until he replaced it with a 1951 model car. Sometime after that, the car was restored at the Henry Ford Museum, until 1993 when it was returned to the GM Design Center.

The "Y" in the name has two explanations:

- All experimental cars were called "X", so Earl simply went to the next letter in the alphabet.
- The "Y" designation was selected by Earl because it was used extensively in the aviation industry denoting the most advanced prototypes.

In 2001, Buick recreated the Y-Job with modern advancements called the Buick Blackhawk drawing extensively from the Y-Job.

== Specifications ==
According to the GM Heritage Center, specifications for the 1938 model were:

Engine: 320 c.i. Inline Eight

Horsepower: 141 @ 3600rpm

Transmission: 3 speed manual

Steering: Bendix power steering unit

Measurements: 208in in length and 74in

Other: Electronically controlled windows and convertible top

== Gallery ==
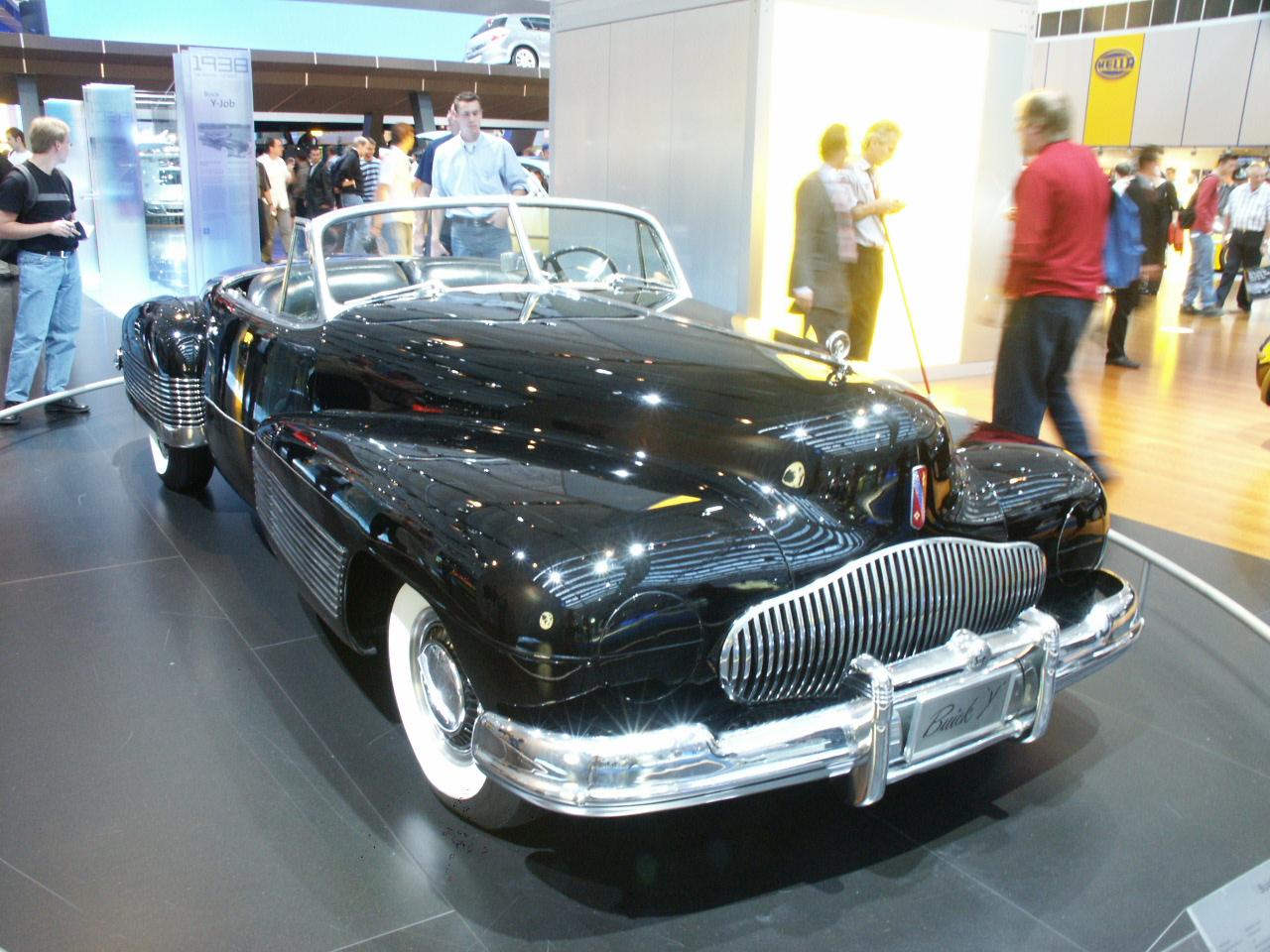
Front view

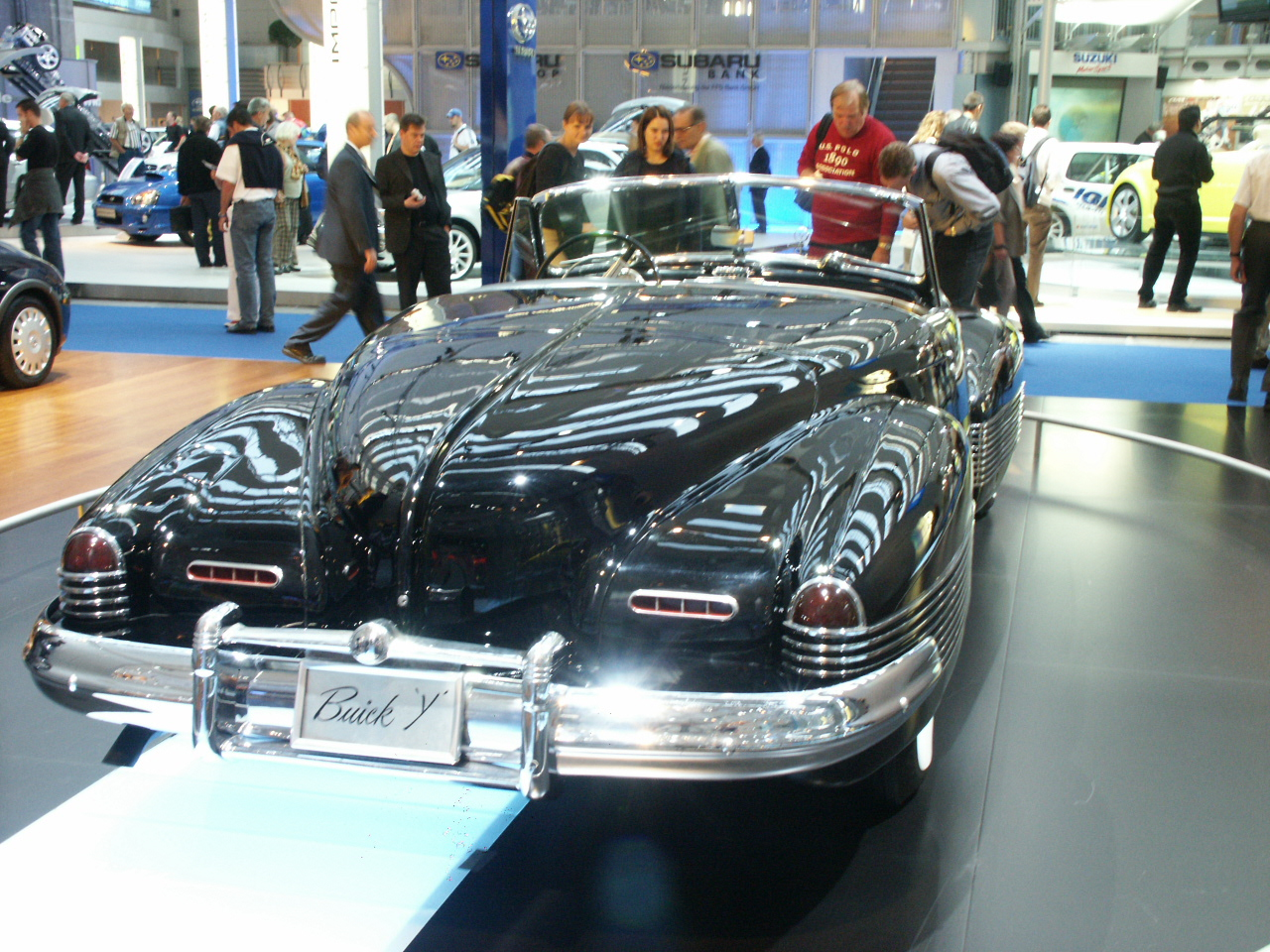
Rear view

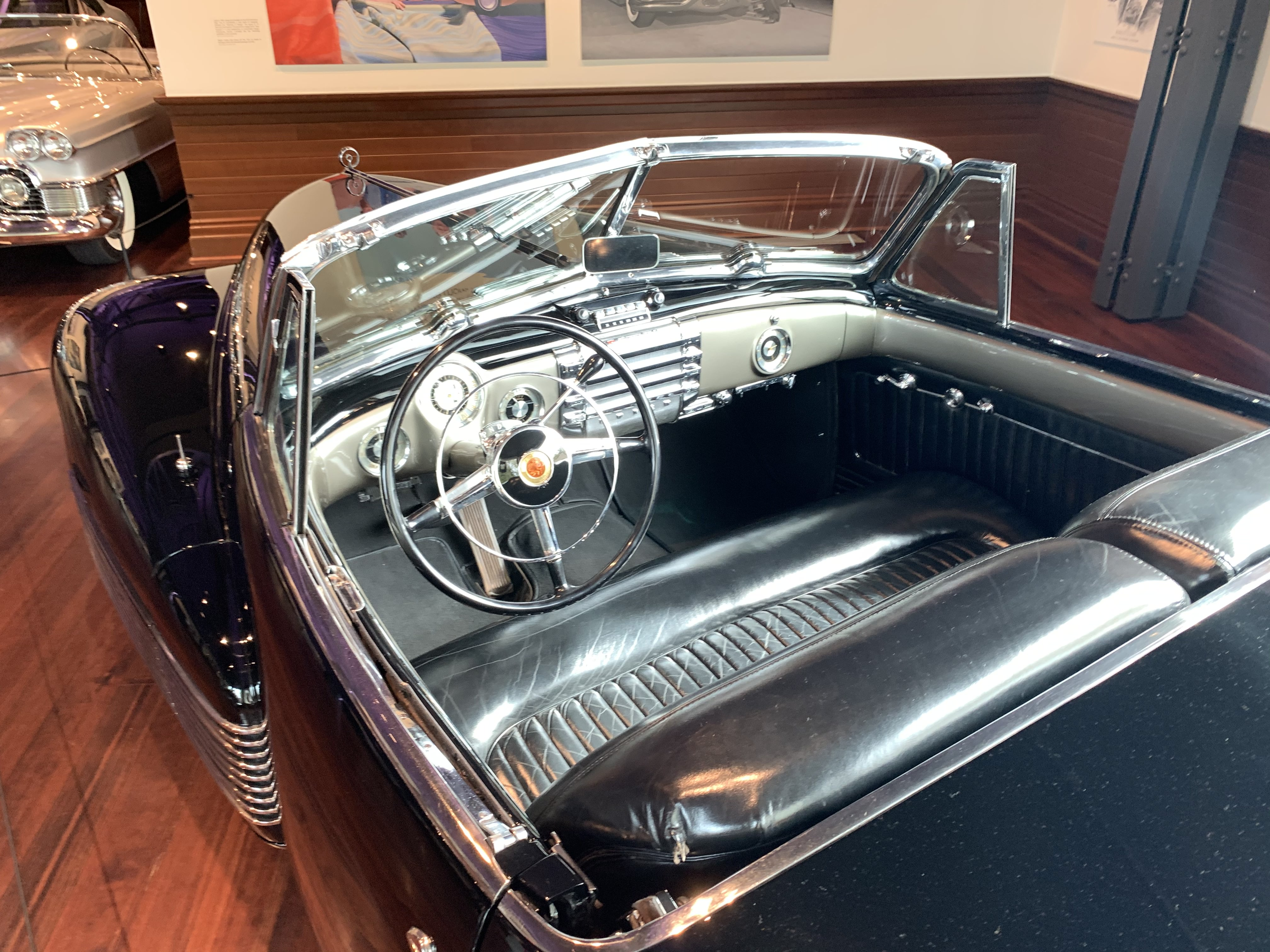
Interior

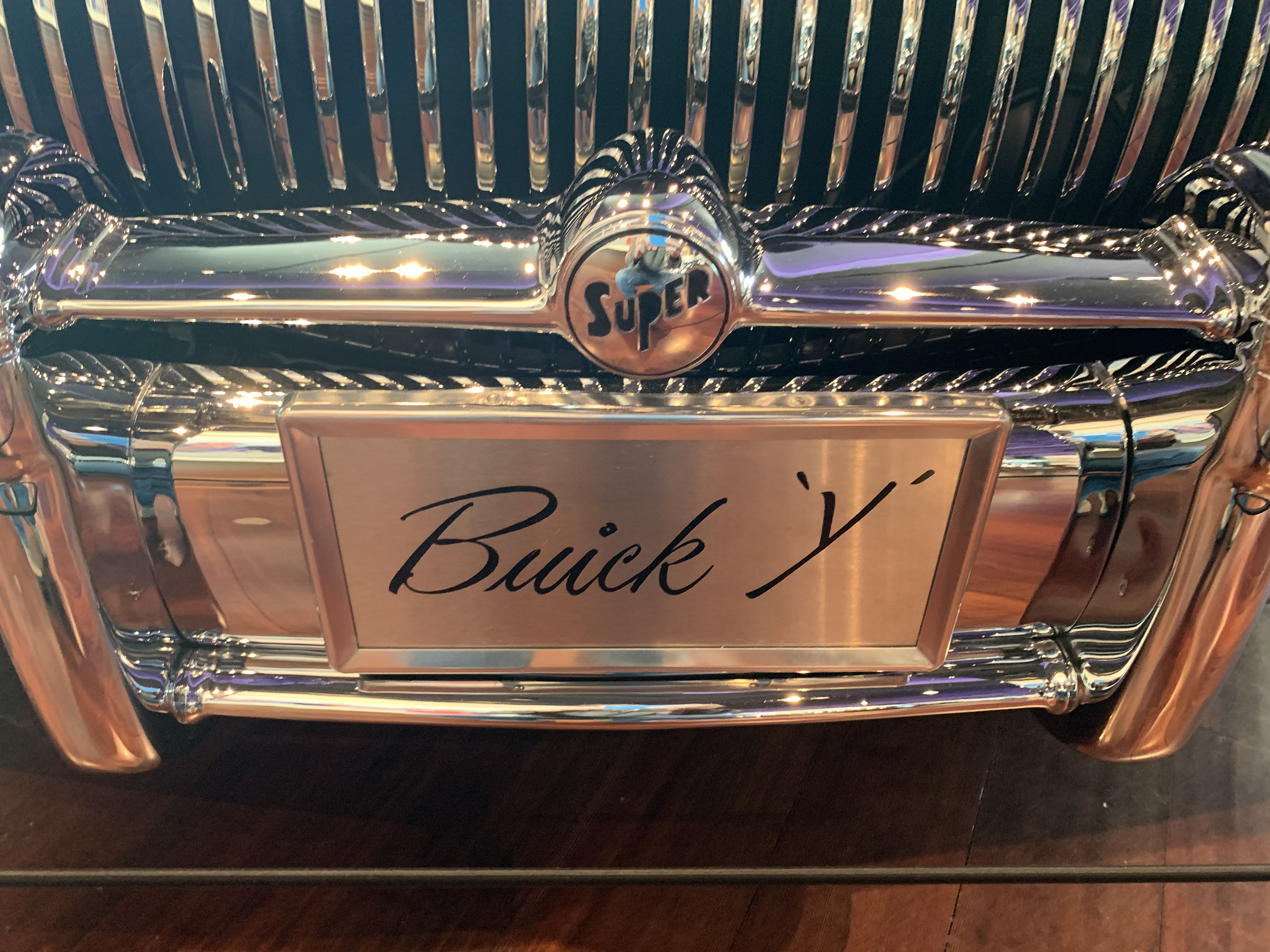
License plate
