= Subaru Forester =

Compact crossover SUV

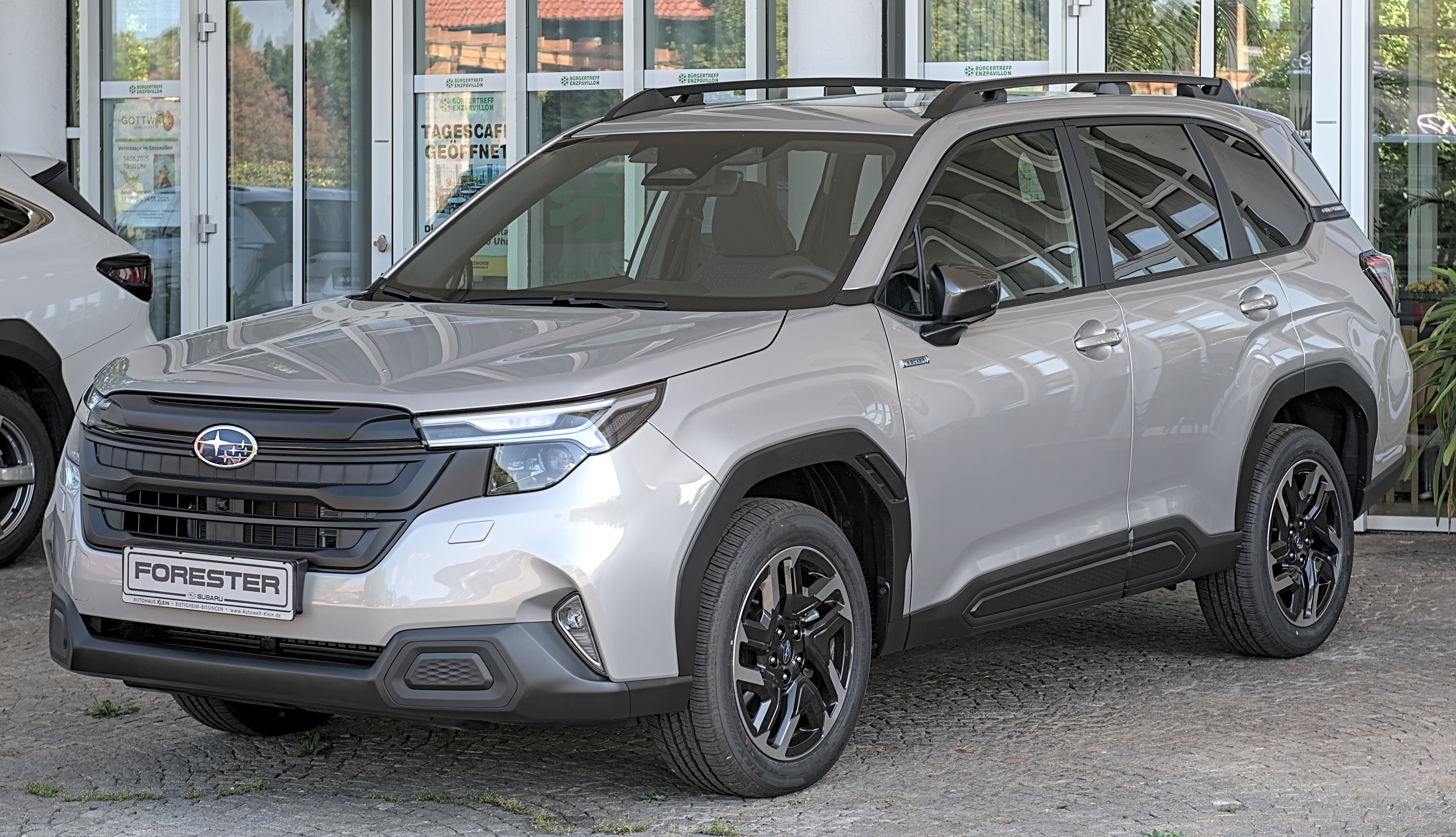

Overview
- Manufacturer: Subaru
- Production: 1997–present

Body and chassis
- Class: Compact crossover SUV
- Body style: 5-door SUV
- Layout: Front-engine, all-wheel drive
- Related: Subaru Impreza

The Subaru Forester (Japanese: スバル・フォレスター, Hepburn: Subaru Foresutā) is a compact crossover SUV that has been manufactured by Subaru since 1997. The first generation was built on the platform of the Impreza in the style of a taller station wagon, a style that continued to the second generation, while the third-generation model onwards moved towards a crossover SUV design. A performance model was available for the second-generation Forester in Japan as the Forester STi.

== First generation (SF; 1997) ==
First generation
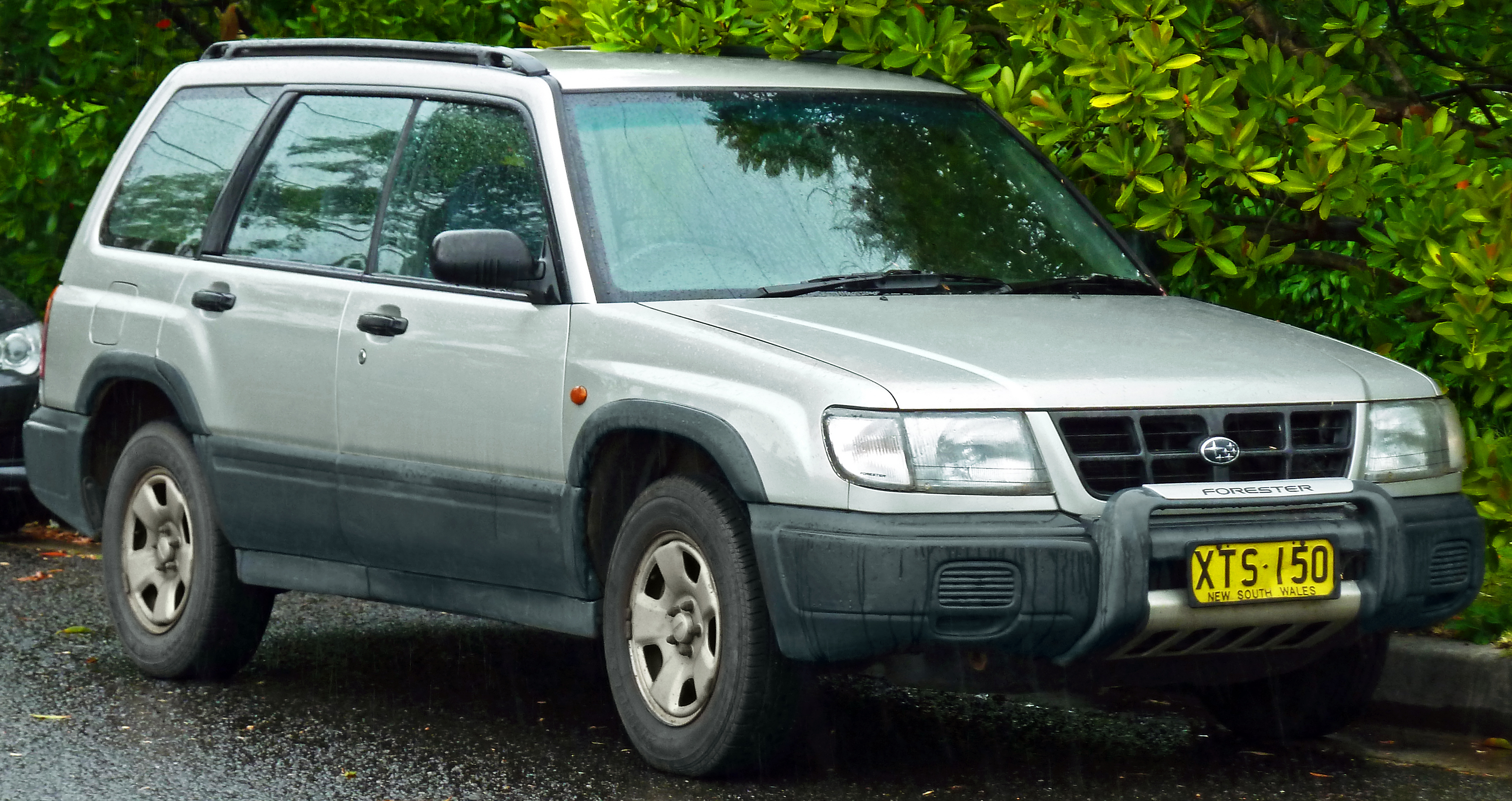
- Pre-facelift

Overview
- Model code: SF
- Production: 1997–2002
- Model years: 1998–2002
- Assembly: Japan: Ōta, Gunma

Body and chassis
- Related: Subaru Impreza; Subaru Impreza WRX; Subaru Impreza WRX STi

Powertrain
- Engine: 2.0 L EJ20 DOHC H4; 2.0 L EJ20T DOHC turbo H4; 2.5 L EJ25D DOHC H4 (1997-1998); 2.5 L EJ251 SOHC (1998-2002)
- Transmission: 5-speed manual; 4-speed automatic

Dimensions
- Wheelbase: 2,525 mm (99.4 in)
- Length: 1997–2000: 4,450 mm (175.2 in); 2000–2002: 4,460 mm (175.6 in)
- Width: 1,735 mm (68.3 in)
- Height: 1,650 mm (65.0 in)
- Curb weight: 1,430 kg (3,152.6 lb)

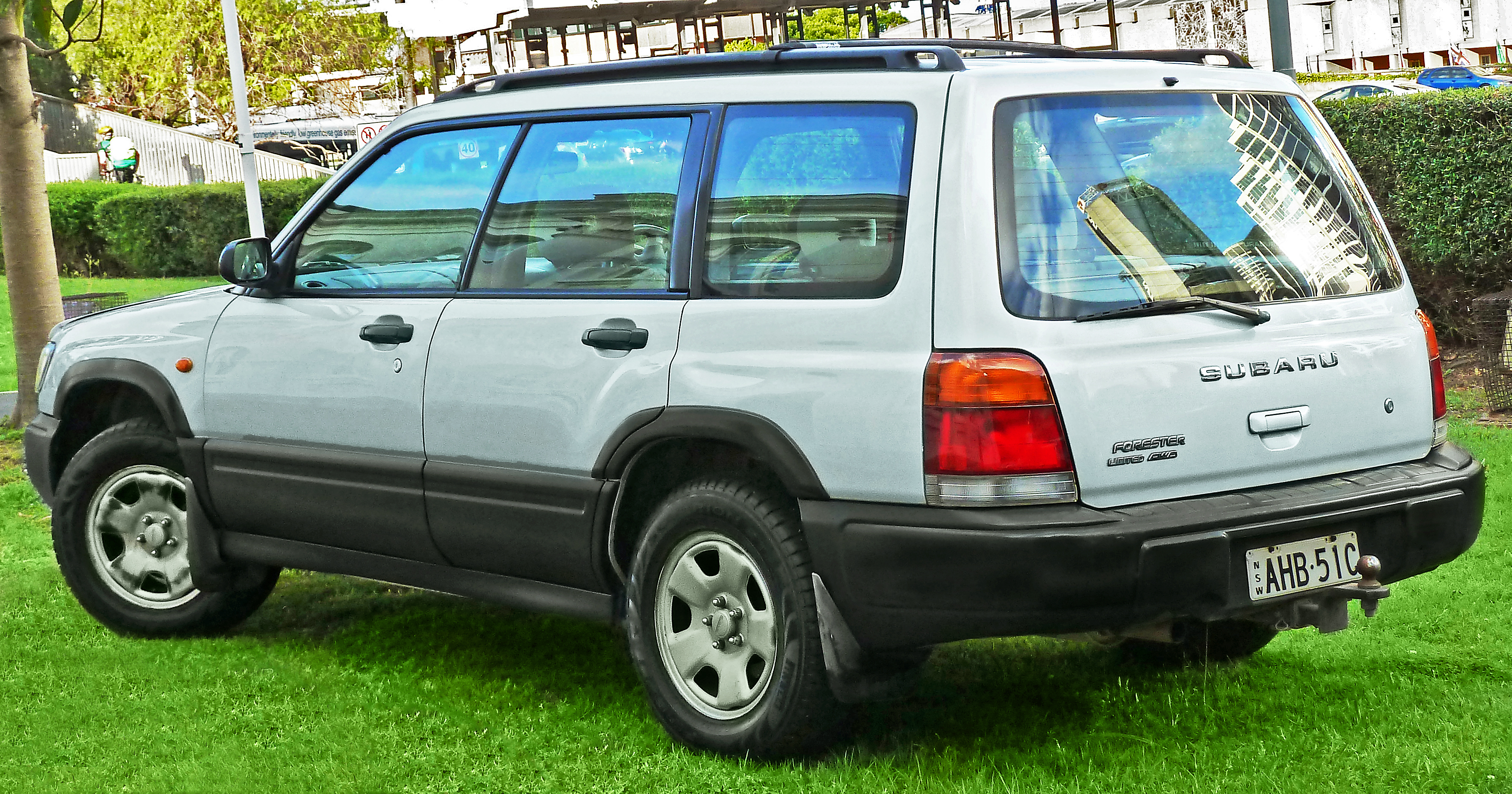
Rear (pre-facelift)

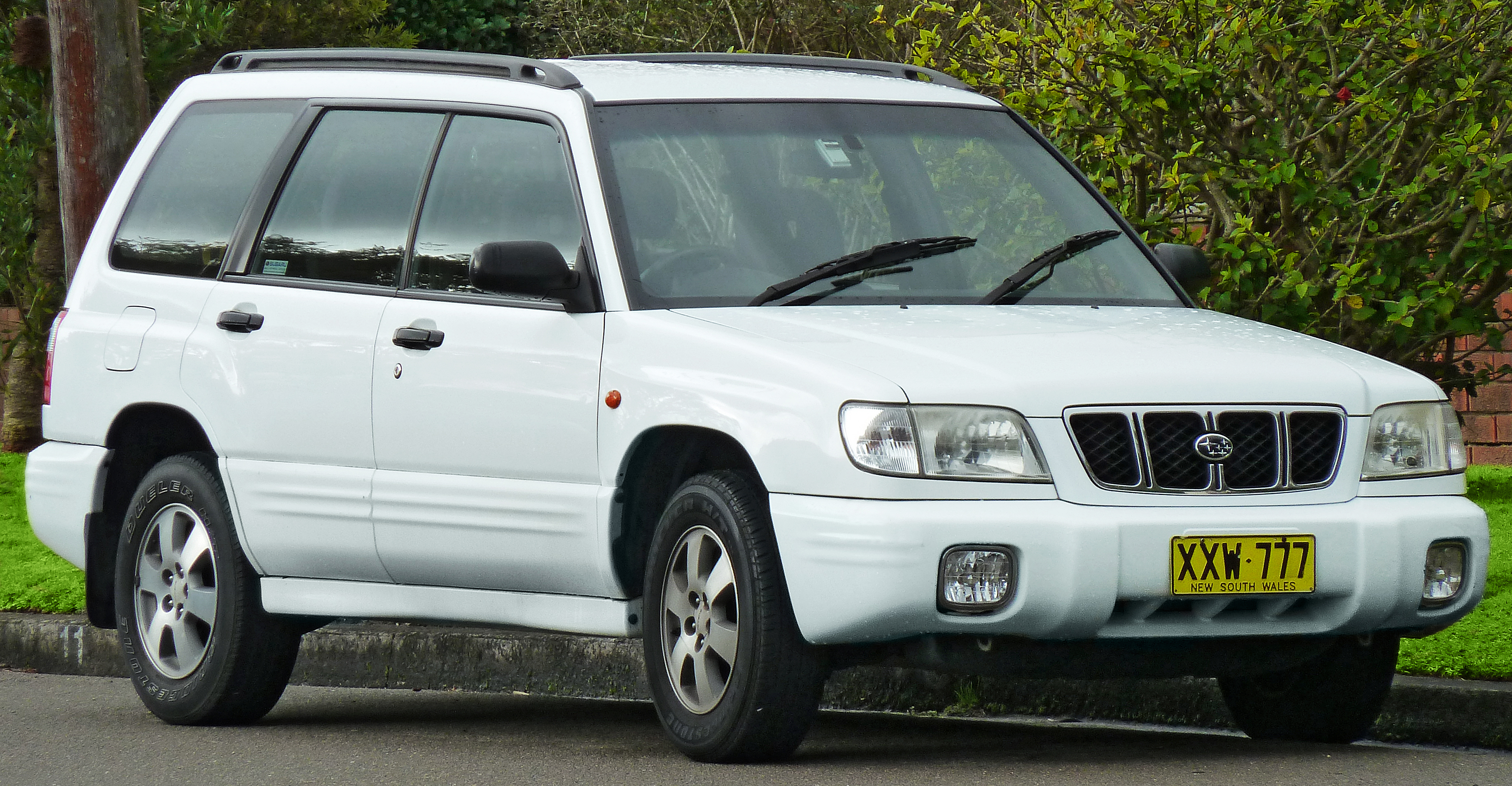
Front (facelift)

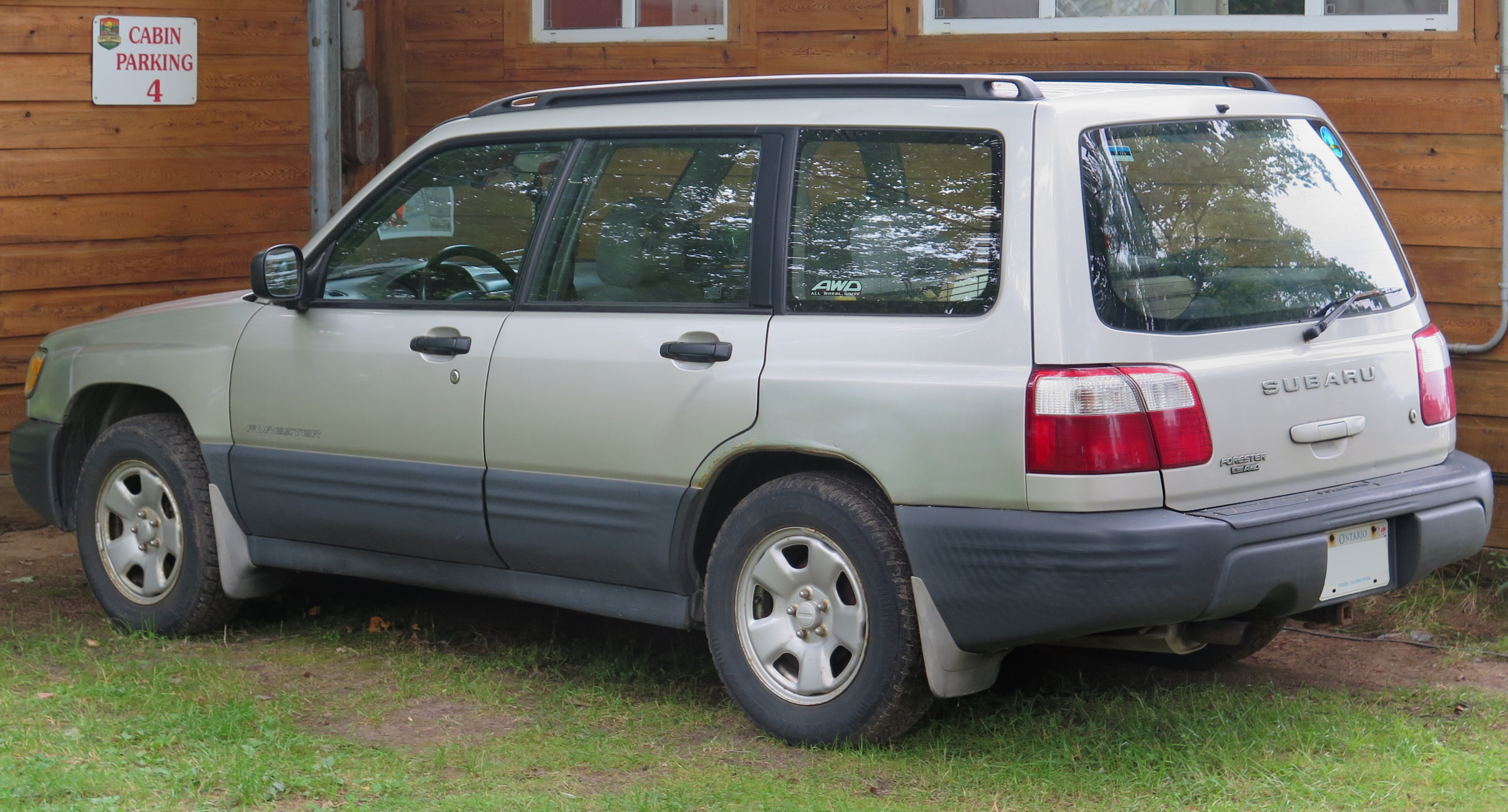
Rear (facelift)

The Forester was first introduced as the Streega concept at the 1995 Tokyo Motor Show and became available for sale in Japan in February 1997, reaching the U.S. market later that year for the 1998 model year. As one of the first crossover SUVs, it was reportedly inspired by Volkswagen. Built in the style of a station wagon, the Forester featured a taller stance, higher H-point seating, and a standard all-wheel drive drivetrain. Subaru marketed it with the slogan "SUV tough, Car Easy". It utilized the Impreza platform but was powered by the larger 2.5-liter DOHC EJ25D engine from the Subaru Outback, producing 123 kW (165 hp) at 5,600 rpm and 220 Nm (162 lb-ft) of torque at 4,000 rpm.

=== Japan ===
In its domestic market, the Forester replaced the Impreza Gravel Express, known in the US as the Subaru Outback Sport. However, the Outback Sport remained in production for the U.S. market. The Forester appeared after the introduction of the Nissan Rasheen in Japan with a similar appearance, and the Forester's Japanese competitors include the Toyota RAV4, Mitsubishi RVR, and the Suzuki Grand Vitara. Because of the Forester's low center of gravity, it meets the United States federal safety standards for passenger vehicles and does not require a "risk of rollover" warning label on the driver's visor. Size- and price-wise, it fits between the shared Impreza platform and the larger Legacy.

The automatic transmissions used on AWD-equipped vehicles will normally send 60% of the engine's torque to the front wheels and 40% to the rear wheels, using a computer-controlled, continuously variable, multi-plate transfer clutch. When the transmission detects a speed difference between the front and rear axle sets, the transmission progressively sends power to the rear wheels. Under slip conditions, it can achieve an equal split in front and rear axle speeds.

When accelerating or driving uphill, the vehicle's weight shifts rearward, reducing front-wheel traction, causing the transmission to automatically send torque to the rear wheels to compensate. When braking or driving downhill, the vehicle's weight shifts towards the front, reducing rear-wheel traction. The transmission again compensates by sending torque to the front wheels for better steering control and braking performance. If the automatic is placed in reverse or first gear, the transmission divides the torque 50/50 to both front and rear wheels. The manual transmission cars are set up with a near 50/50 torque split as a base setting, and it varies from there. Essentially, manual cars are set up with more bias towards the rear than automatic cars.

=== Australia ===
There was a change in body styling for all 2001–2002 models, and the 2001/2002 GT spec also had a change in engine management and power output was increased from 125 to 130 kW (174 hp; 177 PS).

=== United States ===
The U.S. market first got the car starting in late 1997 as a 1998 model. The 1998 had the 2.5-liter DOHC (EJ25D) engine, and in 1999+ models changed to a 2.5-liter SOHC naturally aspirated engine (no turbocharged engines). In 2000, for MY2001, Subaru updated the exterior with a modest facelift to the front, rear, sides, and the interior's dashboard.

The trim levels were the basic model "L" and the fully equipped "S" for the USA versions.

Forester L came with a high level of standard equipment, including ABS, air conditioning, power windows, power locks, cruise control, digital temperature gauge, multi-reflector halogen headlights, fog lights, roof rack, rear window defogger, trailer harness connector, reclining front bucket seats with adjustable lumbar support, tilt steering, tinted glass, AM/FM/cassette stereo with its antenna laminated in the left-rear quarter window. Notably new in 2001 were the three-point seatbelts for all five seating positions, including force limiters in front and height-adjustable shoulder belt anchors for front and rear outboard positions, plus rear seat headrests for all three seating positions.

Forester S adds a viscous limited-slip differential for the 2000 Model Year, rear disc brakes, 16 × 6.5-inch alloy wheels with 215/60R16 tires (the L uses 15 × 6-inch steel wheels), upgraded moquette upholstery, heated front seats with net storage pockets in back, dual vanity mirrors, heated side-view mirrors, heated windshield wipers, and keyless entry. New equipment for 2001 included Titanium pearl paint for the bumpers and cladding; six-disc in-dash CD sound system; leather-wrapped steering wheel, shift knob, and handbrake handle; variable intermittent wipers with de-icers and driver's side fin; and the five-spoke alloy wheels. Some models were equipped with the optional premium package on the Forester S, including monotone paint (Sedona Red Pearl), power moonroof, front side-impact airbags, and gold accent wheels. Other options were the automatic transmission, chrome tailpipe cover, and auto-dimming rear-view mirror with compass.

== Second generation (SG; 2002) ==
Second generation
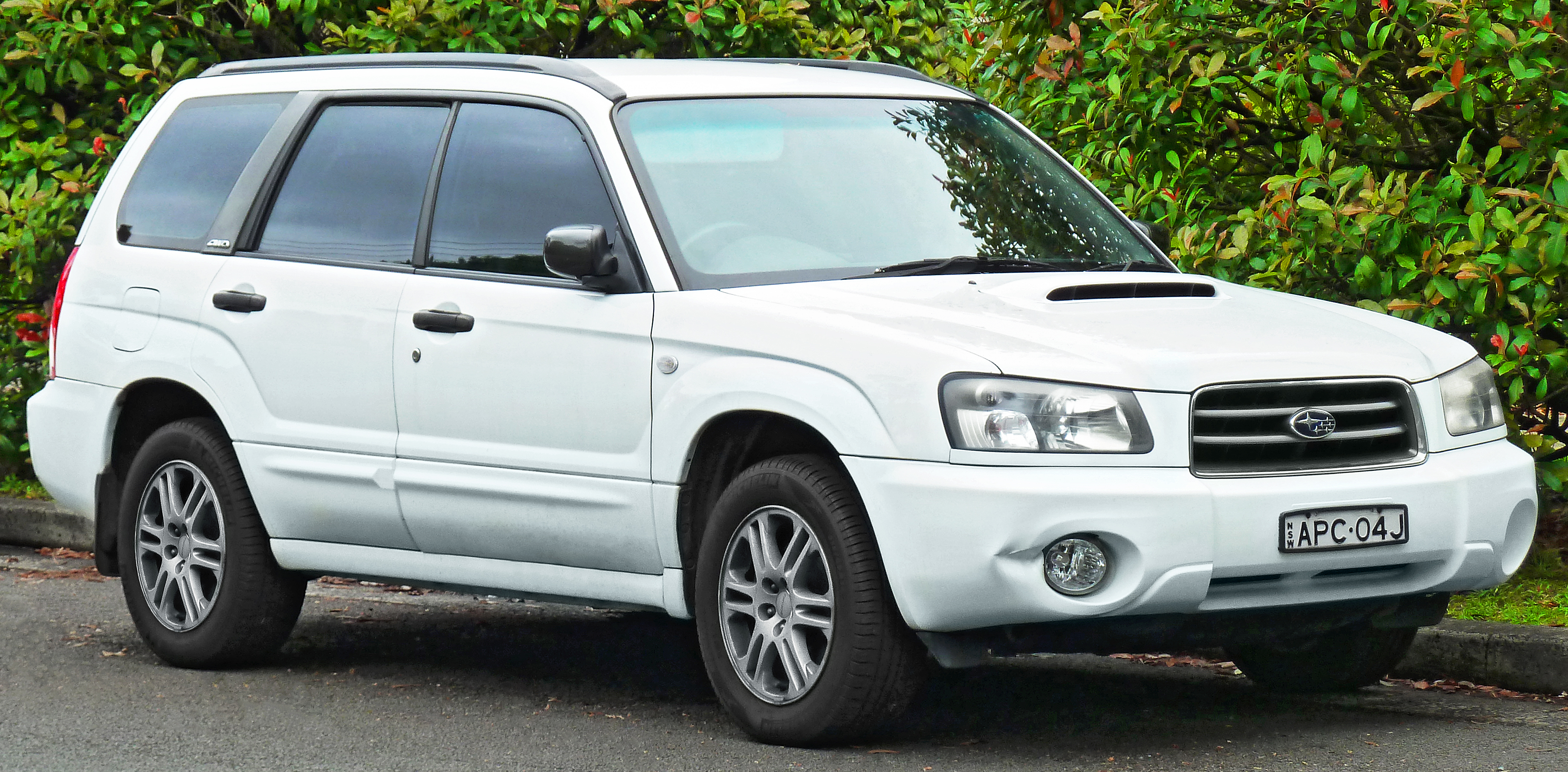
- Pre-facelift

Overview
- Model code: SG
- Also called: Chevrolet Forester (India)
- Production: 2002–2008
- Model years: 2003–2008
- Assembly: Japan: Ōta, Gunma

Body and chassis
- Related: Subaru Impreza; Saab 9-2X; Subaru Impreza WRX; Subaru Impreza WRX STi

Powertrain
- Engine: 2.0 L EJ20 H4; 2.0 L EJ20 turbo H4; 2.5 L EJ253 H4; 2.5 L EJ255 turbo H4; 2.5 L EJ25 turbo H4 (JDM Forester STi)
- Transmission: 5-speed manual; 4-speed automatic; 6-speed manual (STI)

Dimensions
- Wheelbase: 2,525 mm (99.4 in)
- Length: 2003–2005: 4,450 mm (175.2 in); 2006–2008: 4,485 mm (176.6 in)
- Width: 1,735 mm (68.3 in)
- Height: 1,650 mm (65.0 in); Sports 2.5X: 1,590 mm (62.6 in); Sports 2.5XT: 1,585 mm (62.4 in)
- Curb weight: 2.0 L: 1,320 kg (2,910.1 lb); 2.0 L turbo: 1,410 kg (3,108.5 lb); 2.5 L: 1,424 kg (3,139.4 lb); 2.5 L turbo: 1,474 kg (3,249.6 lb)

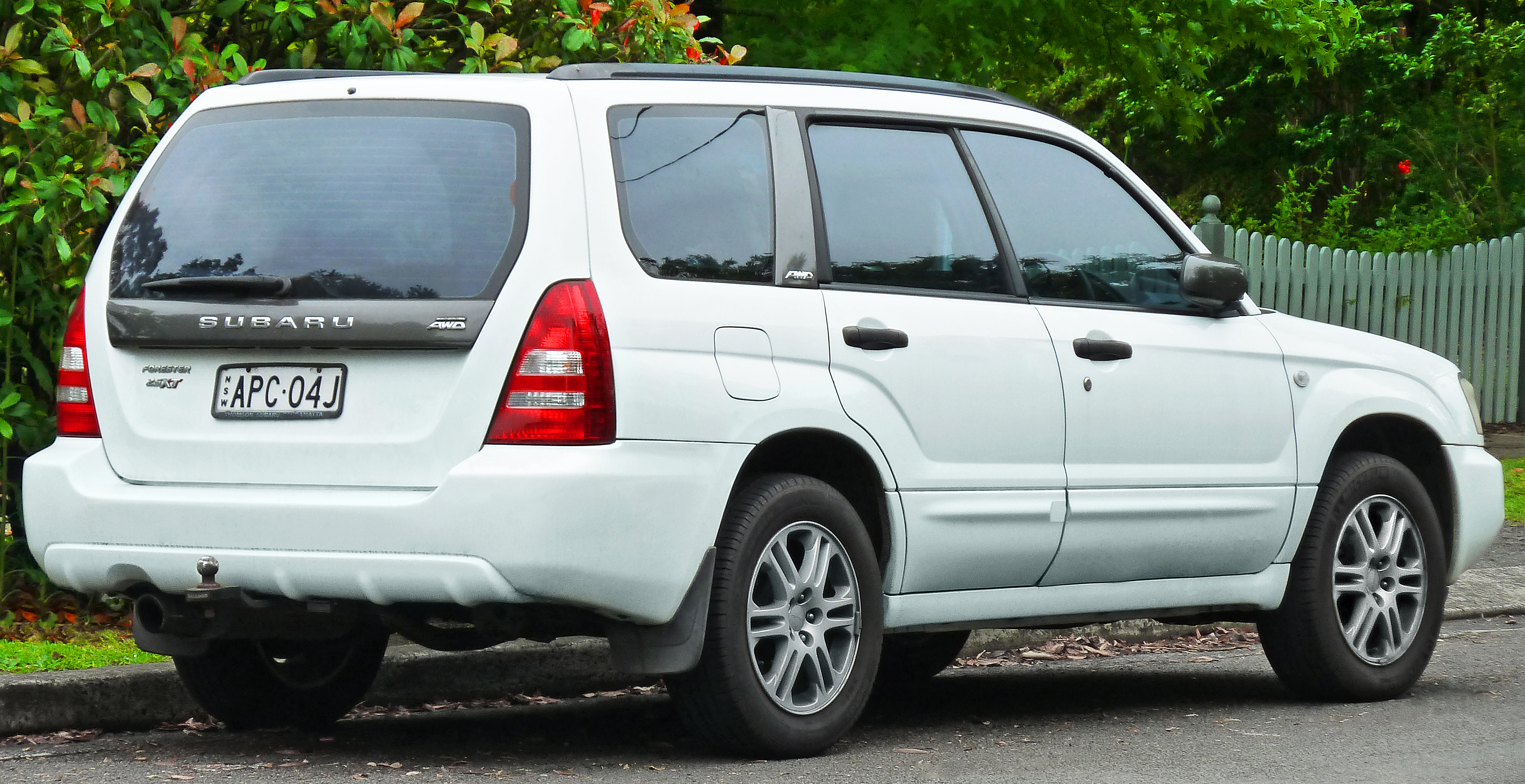
Rear (pre-facelift)

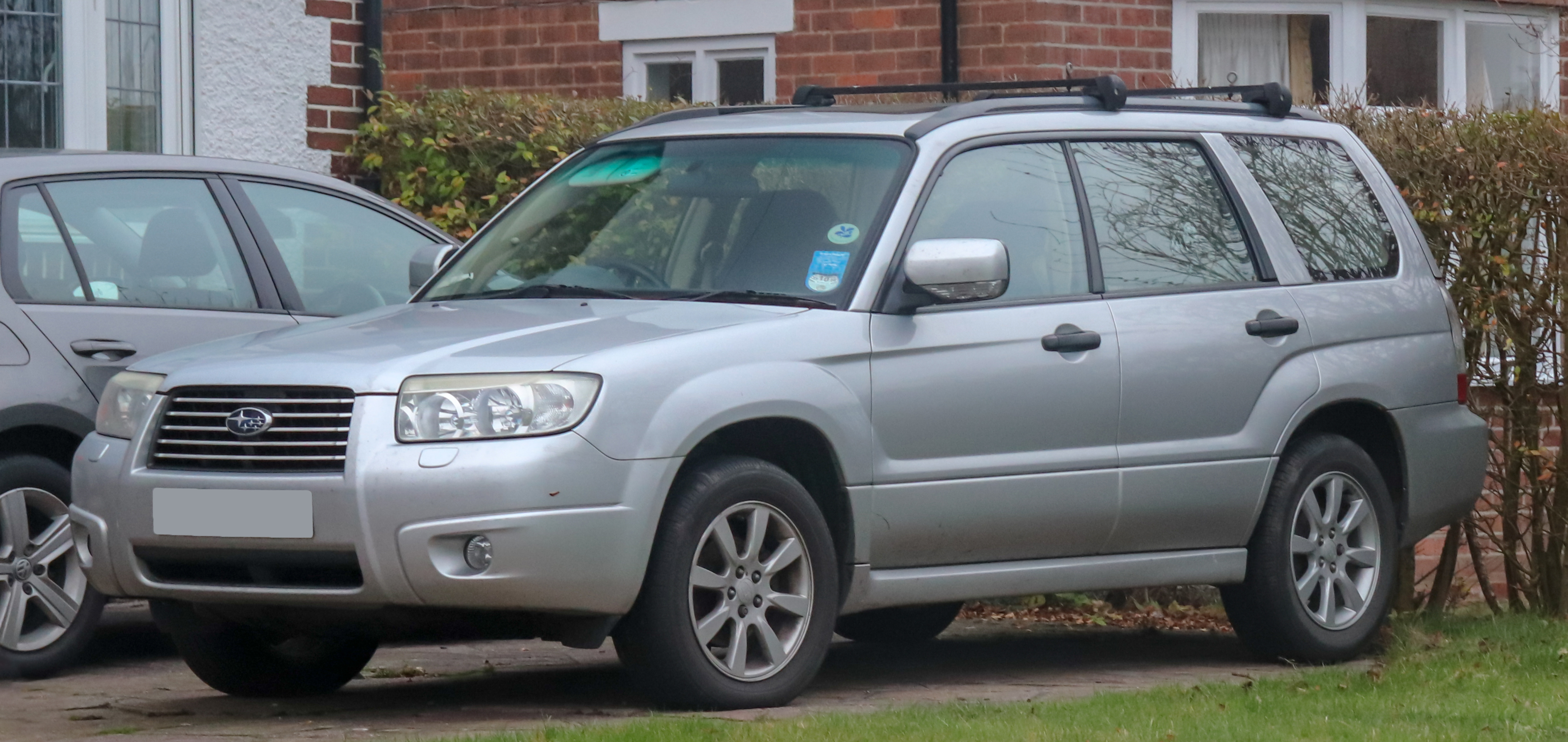
Front (facelift)

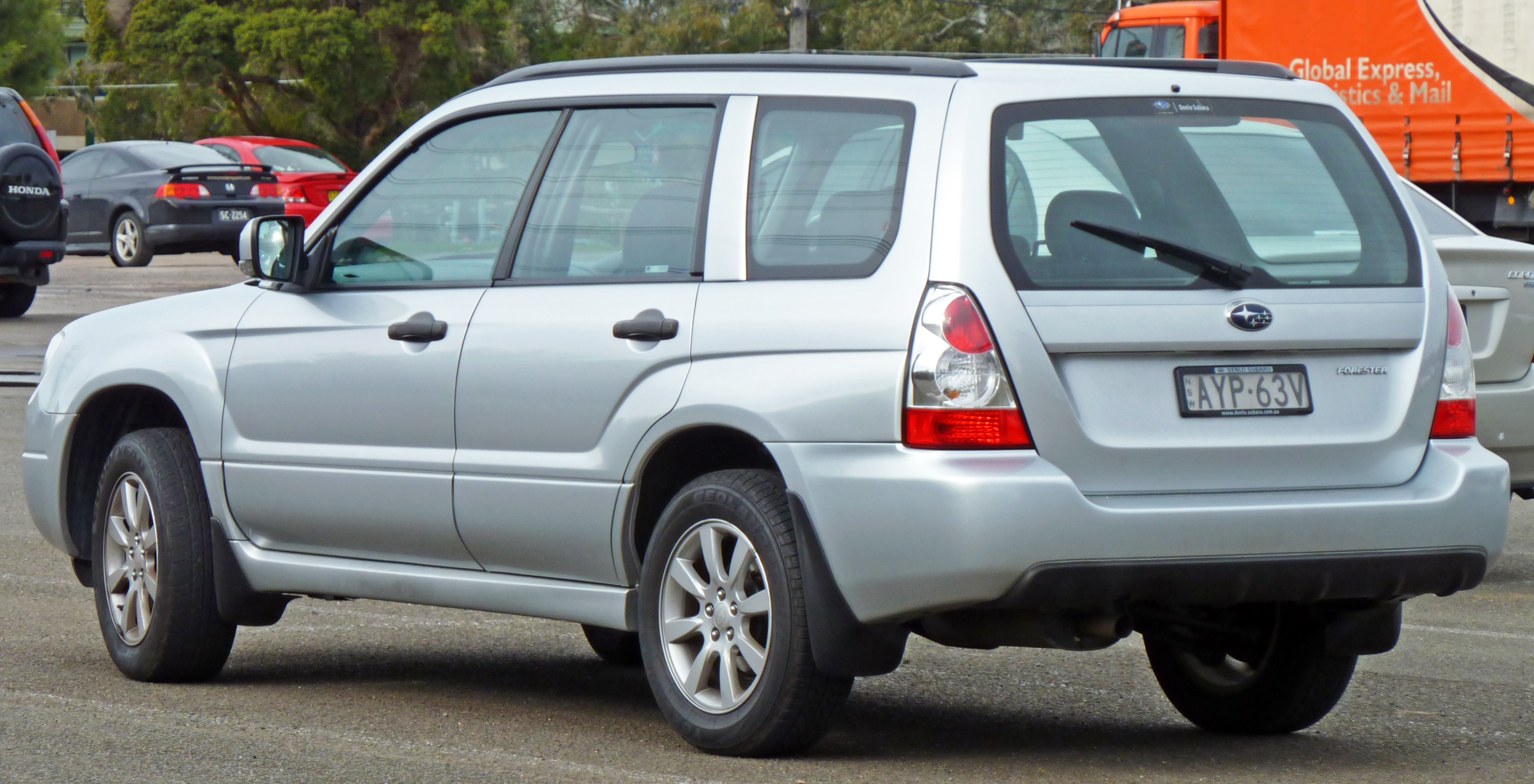
Rear (facelift)

The second generation was introduced as a 2003 model at the 2002 Chicago Auto Show, based on the new Impreza platform, featuring several fine-tune improvements over the past model. The 2003 Forester features weight-saving refinements such as an aluminum hood, perforated rails, and a hydro-formed front sub-frame. The most noticeable change was the offering of 2.5 L versions (normally aspirated and turbocharged) and in the U.S. the introduction of the turbocharged 2.5-liter model.

In the United States, the naturally aspirated X (previously L) and XS (previously S) were released in 2003. In 2004, the turbocharged XT trim was released in the USA. However, a turbocharged version was available since the late 1990s elsewhere in the world. The X and XS models feature a 2.5 L SOHC EJ253 engine, while the XT model features a 2.5 L turbocharged DOHC engine. However, the pre-facelift, naturally aspirated, models featured an EJ251 single overhead cam engine. One of the only differences between the two engines is that the EJ251 is connected via a throttle cable. Whereas the EJ253, introduced in the facelift, used a drive by wire system. Both engines have timing belt (camshaft). The XT model uses the same Mitsubishi Motors TD04 turbocharger used in the Subaru Impreza WRX. All Forester 2.5 L engines are of the interference engine type. The flat engine can be mounted lower in the car and gives the Forester a lower center of gravity than other 4x4s or soft roaders. The two-liter gasoline boxer-four engined version is reported to do 24 miles per imperial gallon (12 L/100 km; 20 mpg_{‑US}) of fuel in town.

Starting with the 2004 XT, the turbocharged version had Active valve control system cylinder heads. The i-AVLS (active valve lift system) became standard on the naturally aspirated version of the Forester in 2006. This increased horsepower and torque figures to 173 HP and 166 ft-lbs. The 2006 XT received a higher compression ratio to 8.4:1 from 8.2:1. This increased the XT's power to 230 HP and 235 ft-lbs.

For the 2006 model year, Subaru gave the SG Forester a facelift, using redesigned headlights, tail lights, hood, grille, front bumper, and side mouldings.

=== Safety ===
MY03-04 Models has a 4-Star ANCAP safety rating. MY05 Forester Model had a mid-life update, which increased its ANCAP safety rating to 5 Stars.

ANCAP test results* Subaru Forester X wagon with dual frontal airbags (2002)
| Test | Score |
|---|---|
| Overall | 4 /5 stars |
| Frontal offset | 12.78/16 |
| Side impact | 16/16 |
| Pole | Not Assessed |
| Seat belt reminders | 0/3 |
| Whiplash protection | Not Assessed |
| Pedestrian protection | Poor |
| Electronic stability control | Not Assessed |

ANCAP test results* Subaru Forester XS-LP (2002)
| Test | Score |
|---|---|
| Overall | 5 /5 stars |
| Frontal offset | 13.78/16 |
| Side impact | 16/16 |
| Pole | 2/2 |
| Seat belt reminders | 1/3 |
| Whiplash protection | Not Assessed |
| Pedestrian protection | Poor |
| Electronic stability control | Not Assessed |

ANCAP test results* Subaru Forester Wagon (2003)
| Test | Score |
|---|---|
| Overall | 5 /5 stars |
| Frontal offset | 13.78/16 |
| Side impact | 16/16 |
| Pole | 2/2 |
| Seat belt reminders | 1/3 |
| Whiplash protection | Not Assessed |
| Pedestrian protection | Poor |
| Electronic stability control | Not Assessed |

In 2006, the turbocharged engine (powering the Forester XT) was awarded International Engine of the Year. This engine is also used in the Subaru Impreza WRX, as well as the re-badged Saab 9-2X Aero.

=== Maintenance ===
All of the 2.5-liter 4-cylinder engines for this generation have a timing belt made of rubber and cord. A belt must be replaced at 105,000 miles (169,000 km). These engines are interference engines, meaning that if the timing belt breaks or stretches, the pistons will hit the valves, requiring an engine teardown, and a likely rebuild. Also, if this belt is replaced around 105,000 miles, it is a good idea to change the water pump, thermostat, belt tensioner and all the idler pulleys for this belt. The water pump and thermostat are behind this belt. In Australia for the Series II (MY06) cars, Subaru changed the recommended service interval for the timing belt replacement from 100,000 kilometers to 125,000 kilometers. The 2.5-liter 4-cylinder engine in the first-generation Foresters featured head gaskets which were prone to premature failure. For 2003 and later, this problem was addressed with a revised, higher performing design, but it remained a problem.

=== United States ===
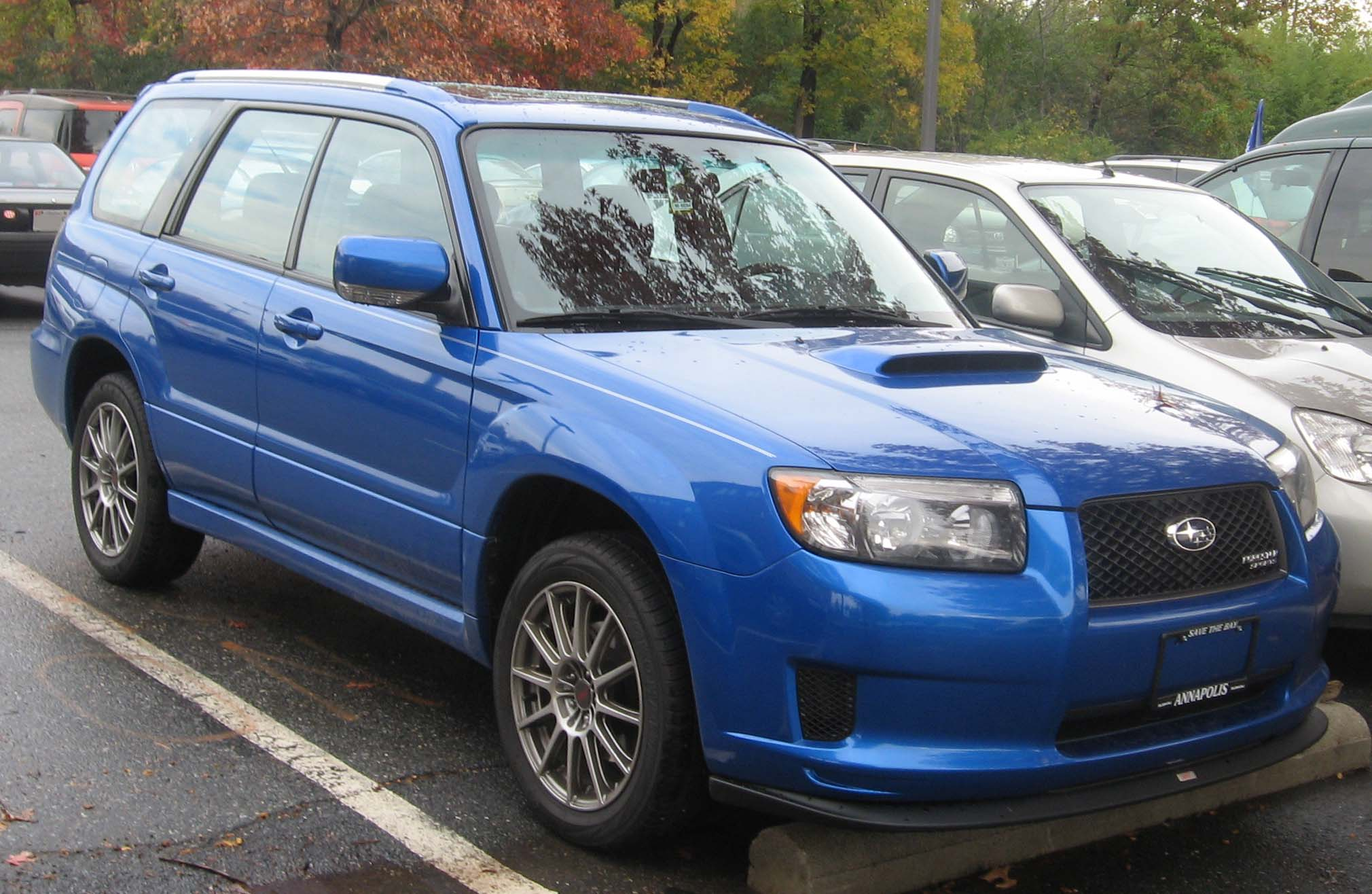
2006–2008 Subaru Forester XT Sports

For the U.S. market, the car was offered with either the 2.5 SOHC naturally aspirated engine, or the 2.5 DOHC turbocharged version added in 2004. In 2005, the L.L. Bean edition was added. In 2006, the styling was updated, Active valve lift system was added to non-turbo engines to improve power and efficiency, the XS model was deleted, and the Premium model was added. In 2007, a bottle holder was added to front door panels, the 'Sports' trim level was added, which changed some interior and exterior features and added the VDT/VDC transmission to the XT Sports turbo Automatic model. In 2008, TPMS was added, the L.L. Bean model deleted rear load-leveling suspension but gained a radio upgrade, and the XT Turbo Limited models got the VDT/VDC Auto transmission.

=== Australia ===
The Forester had three main models available in Australia until July 2005, which are X, XS and XT. Both the X and XS are equipped with the naturally aspirated 2.5 L engine producing 112 kW (150 hp), while the XT received the turbo engine with a higher output of 155 kW (208 hp). From the Series II which was released in August 2005, the engine was upgraded to 121 kW (162 hp) for the X and XS and 169 kW (227 hp) for the XT grade.

Following a General Motors (GM) and Subaru tie-up in 1999, GM considered rebadging the Forester as a Holden in the Australian market as the brand lacked an SUV offering. In exchange, GM would provide Subaru the Holden VY Ute. Subaru considered naming the rebadged Ute the Subaru Brumby. According to former Subaru Australia managing director Nick Senior, the plan was called off due to objection from Subaru Australia.

=== India ===
The Forester was sold in India by General Motors India as the Chevrolet Forester. Introduced in 2003, it was the first Chevrolet-badged model released in India, as previous GM models are badged as Opels. Sales of the Chevrolet Forester ended in 2007 since General Motors no longer holds an ownership stake in Subaru's parent company, Fuji Heavy Industries.

=== China ===
A look-alike was produced by Yema Auto and known as the Yema F99 in China. It was a similar design to the pre-facelifted model. Production ran from 2012 to 2014. The engine was a 1.5l 4 cylinder mated to a 5-speed manual gearbox. The car was not related to the Forester even though they look very similar. The Forester was imported to China from 2004 until 2007 in the following models:

2004 Version sold in China:

- 2.0XT Automatic

2006 Version (Facelift) sold in China:

- 2.0X Manual
- 2.0X Automatic
- 2.5XT Automatic

2007 Version (Facelift) sold in China:

- 2.0X Manual
- 2.0X Automatic
- 2.5XT Automatic

=== Forester STi (SF and SG; 2004) ===
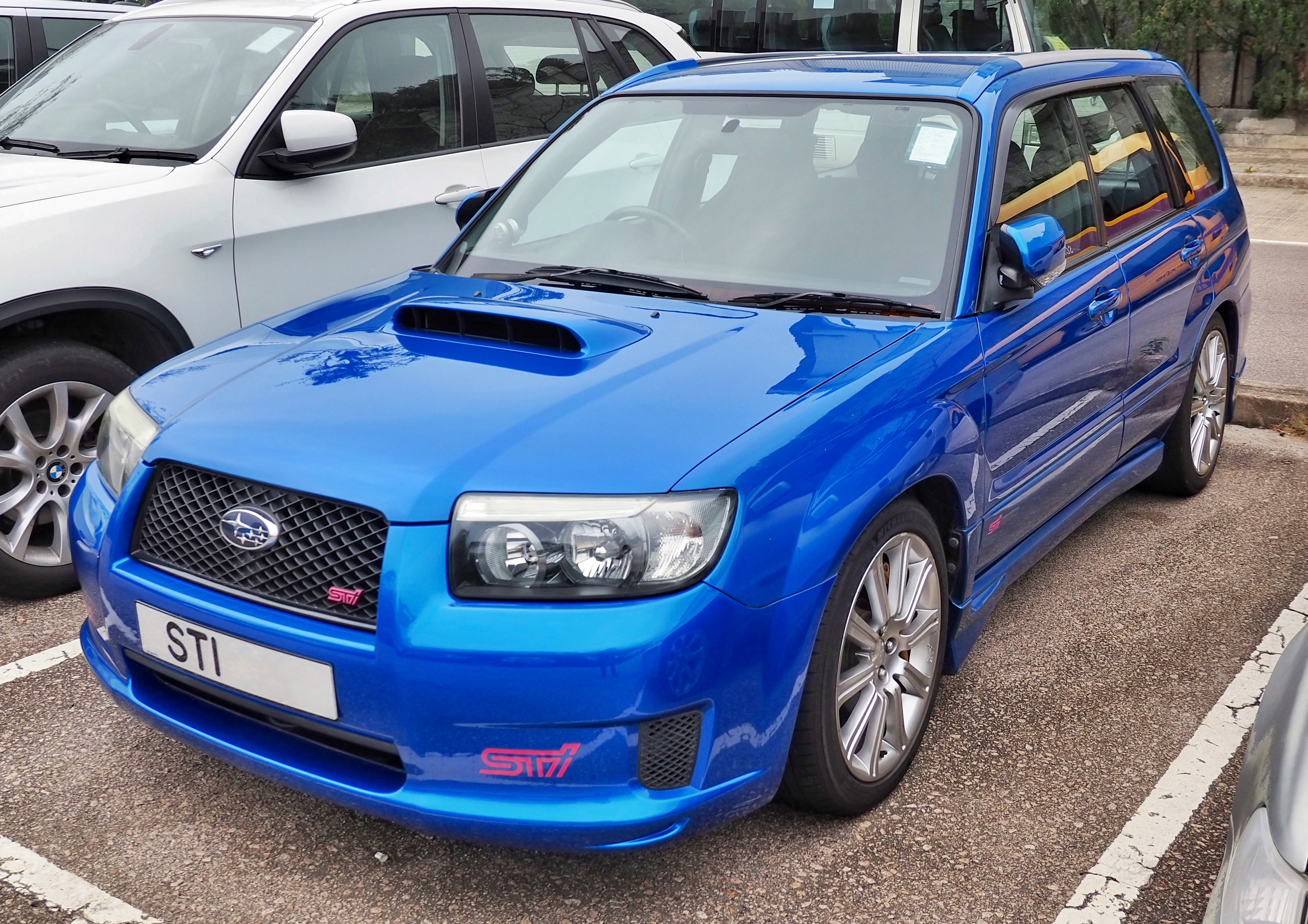
Subaru Forester STI

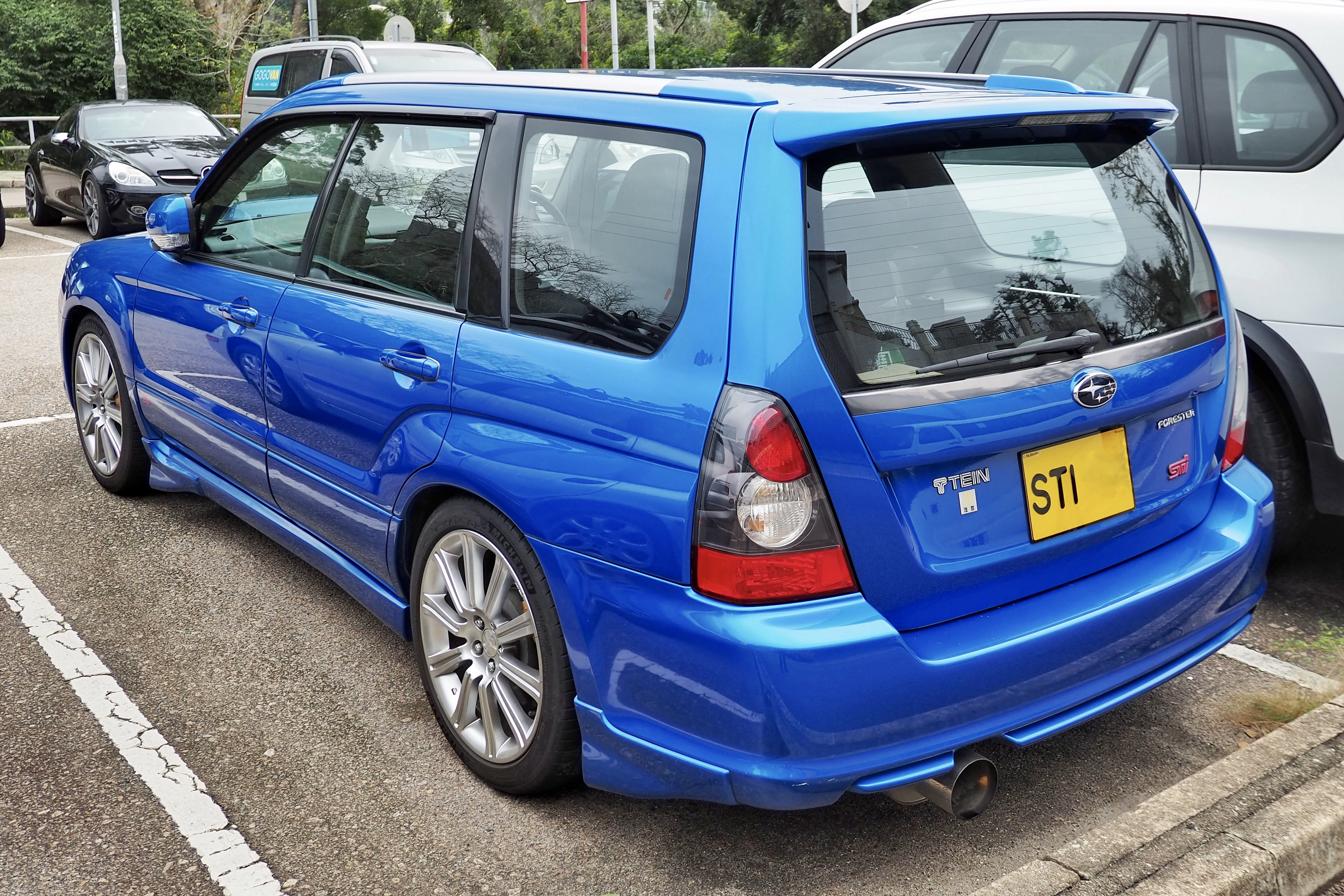
Subaru Forester STI

In 2004, Subaru launched the Forester STi for the Japanese market only. A "sportier" version of the standard second-gen (SG) Forester, the Forester STi incorporated most of the running components from the WRX STi, with several other changes. It was never sold outside of Japan.

The Forester STi exterior was modified with additions such as a redesigned front fascia with new headlights, front bumper, grille and "STi" badged covered fog lights, like those seen on the Impreza WRX STi. The rear fascia was also redesigned with revised taillights, a revised rear bumper, and an added rear spoiler.

Multiple changes were made to the engine and the mechanical components of the Forester to create the Forester STi. They include the engine, which received a 2.5-liter turbocharged flat-four [block designated EJ255, not from the WRX STi which used a block designated EJ257], making 265 PS (261 hp; 195 kW) and 186 lb-ft of torque. While the block was not shared with the STI, the Forester STI shared the STI’s better breathing manifold, painted in matt crinkle red, allowing it to produce more power and torque than other 2.5L EJ255 engined SG9 Foresters sold in AU/NZ from 2003-2008.

A much stronger six-speed manual gearbox, from the WRX STI, a larger intercooler, and a low-back-pressure exhaust system were also added. The top three ratios of the gearbox are 14 percent taller to match the engine's torque curve, raising the vehicle’s top speed and allowing more relaxed highway cruising at lower rpm. As the result, the 2006 Forester STi accelerates from 0–60 mph (0–97 km/h) in 5.2 seconds, 0–62 mph (0–100 km/h) in 5.4 seconds, and does the quarter mile in 14.1 seconds at 97.0 mph (156.1 km/h). It can reach a top speed of 140 mph (230 km/h) and has a power to weight ratio of 174 hp per ton.

To cope with the extra power made by the new engine, the Forester STi got many upgraded suspension components including STi sport springs, revised struts at each corner, and bigger anti-roll bars and cross-members. These changes resulted in a 1.2 inch lower ride height and improved resistance to torsional forces. Rolling resistance was also improved, but the higher center of gravity of the Forester still remained. The Forester STi is also equipped with a new steering rack with a quicker ratio that leads to a more deliberate turn-in.

The Forester STi got 18-inch, 10-spoke alloy wheels with 225/45R-18 Bridgestone Potenza tires. Four-piston Brembo brakes, painted red, are employed on the front wheels, and two-piston Brembo are used at the rear, enhanced braking performance and lowering stopping distances and fade resistance under heavy use. It also has special STi bucket seats, unique to the Forester STI, trimmed in dark grey cloth, deeply moulded for much stronger hip and torso support. A smaller leather MOMO steering wheel, and a weighted, leather shift knob with red stitching and a H-pattern 6-speed shift map.

== Third generation (SH; 2008) ==
Third generation
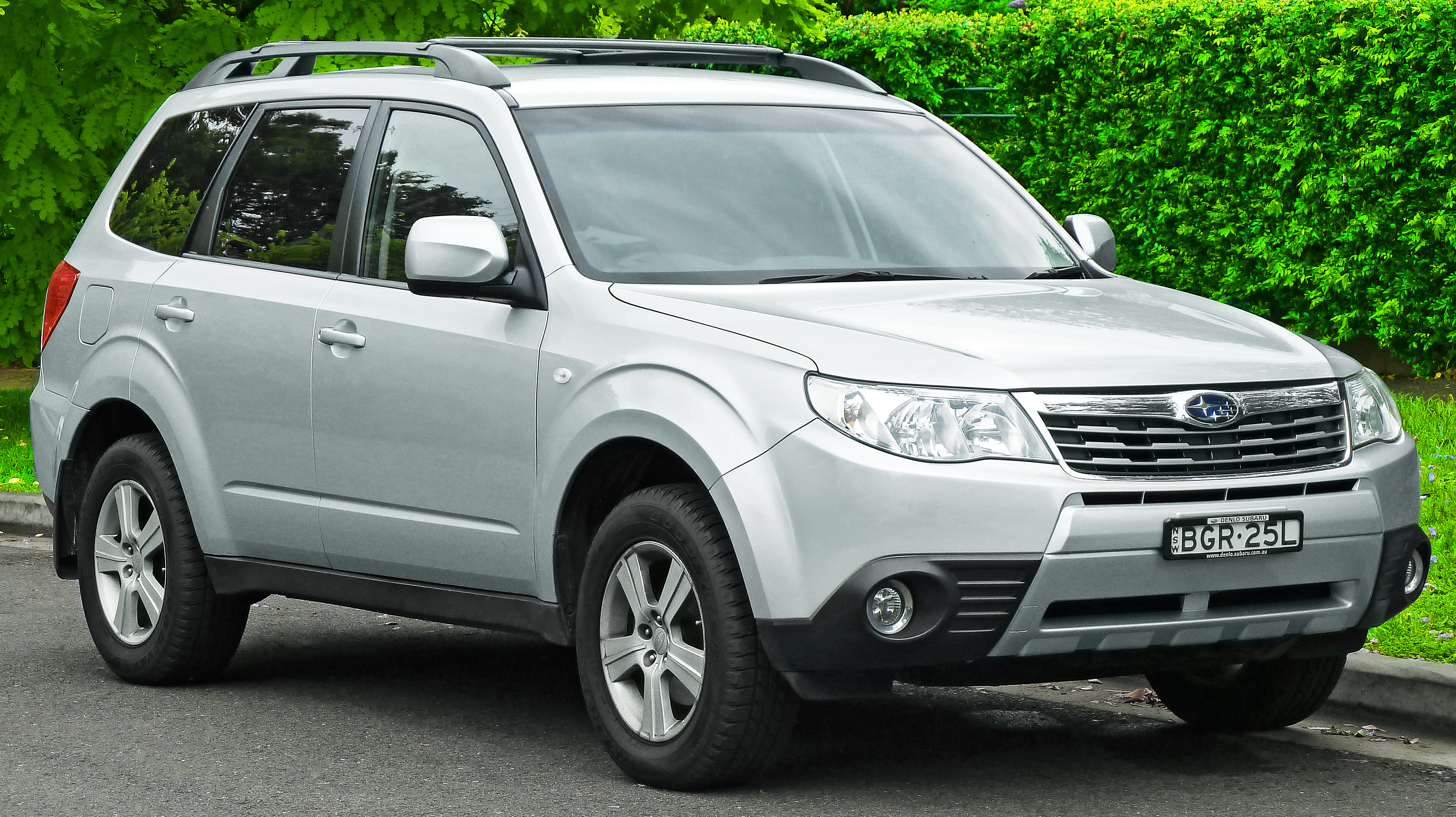
- Pre-facelift

Overview
- Model code: SH
- Production: 2008–2013
- Model years: 2009–2013
- Assembly: Japan: Ōta, Gunma

Powertrain
- Engine: Gasoline: 2.0 L EJ20 H4; 2.0 L EJ20 H4 turbo; 2.0 L FB20 H4; 2.5 L EJ25 H4; 2.5 L FB25 H4; 2.5 L EJ25 H4 turbo; Diesel: 2.0 L EE20 H4 turbo
- Transmission: 5-speed manual; 6-speed manual (diesel); 4-speed automatic; 5-speed automatic (S-edition)

Dimensions
- Wheelbase: 2,616 mm (103 in)
- Length: 4,559 mm (179.5 in)
- Width: 1,781 mm (70.1 in)
- Height: 1,674 mm (65.9 in); 1,742 mm (68.6 in) (2010-2012 2.5X/XT)
- Curb weight: 1,470 kg (3,250 lb)

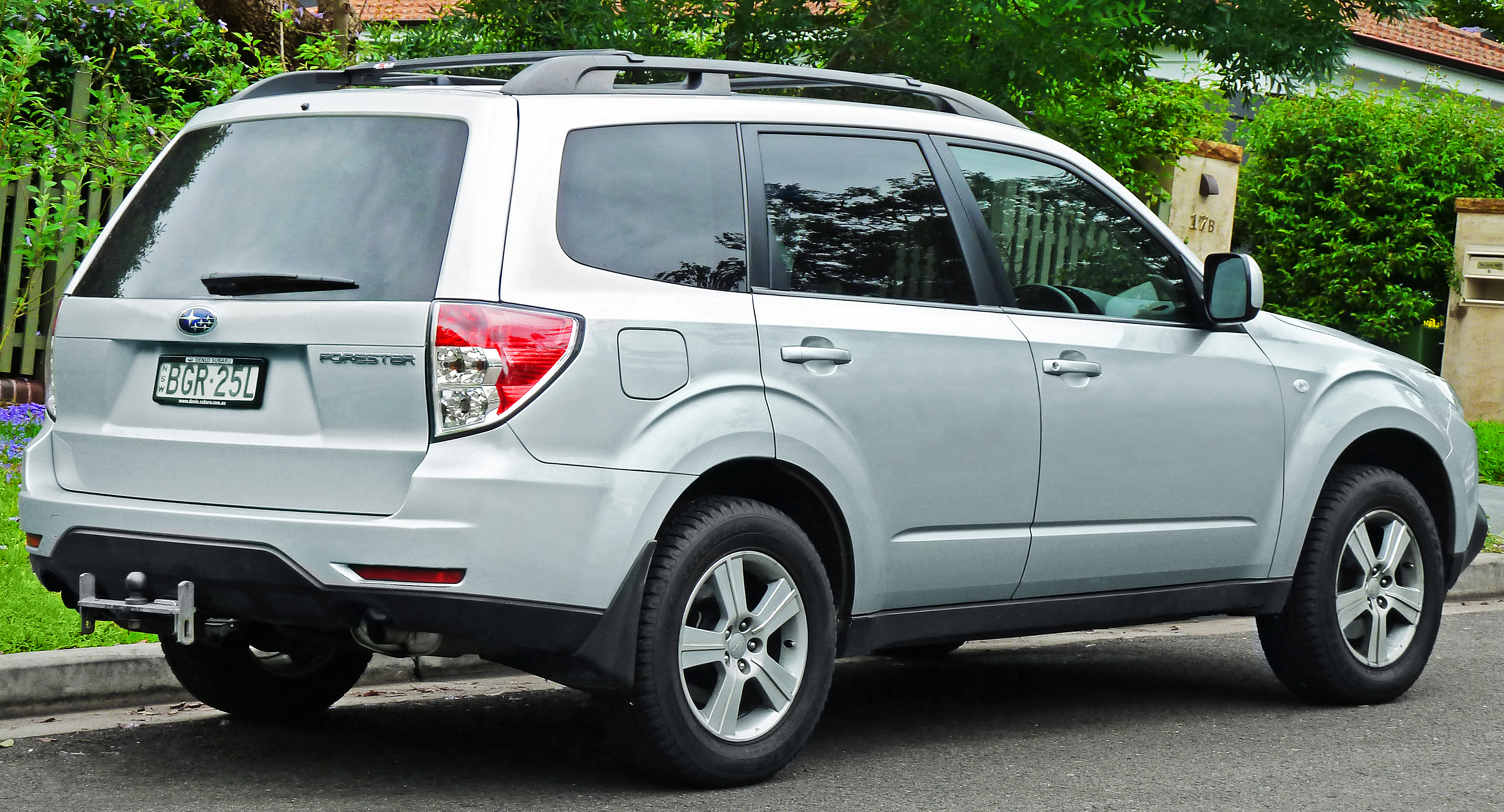
Rear (pre-facelift)

The third-generation Forester began to move away from a traditional wagon design towards becoming a crossover SUV. It was larger in nearly every dimension and featured a sloping roofline with more cargo space. Subaru unveiled the 2008 model year Forester in Japan on December 25, 2007. The North American version made its debut at the 2008 North American International Auto Show in Detroit.

Styling was by Subaru Chief Designer Mamoru Ishii. The dimensions derive from engineers using the basic body structure of the Japanese-spec Impreza wagon with the rear platform of the U.S.-spec Impreza sedan. The Forester's wheelbase was increased 3.5 inches (89 mm), with overall increases of 3.0 inches (76 mm) in length, 1.8 inches (46 mm) in width and 4.3 inches (110 mm) in height.

The independent double-wishbone rear suspension was redesigned for better handling and a smoother ride. A "Sportshift" mode was added to the four-speed computer-controlled automatic transmission. The in-dash, touch-screen satellite navigation system became Bluetooth compatible, and integrated with a premium stereo. A six-speaker surround sound enhancement was optional.

The new model added 3.5 inches (89 mm) to the Forester's wheelbase, improving interior space and cargo room (31 cu ft (0.88 m^{3}) expandable to 69 cu ft (2.0 m^{3})). Ground clearance was 8.9 inches (230 mm).

=== Europe ===
The Forester was available in Europe from 2008 with either the 2.0-liter EJ20 (150 hp; 110 kW) 196 Nm gasoline engine with Active Valve Control System (AVCS) matched to either five-speed manual or four-speed automatic gearbox, or an all-new diesel-powered horizontally opposed Subaru EE boxer engine, and six-speed manual gearbox. The new model was introduced at the 2008 Paris Motor Show in October. The diesel engine produces a power output of 147 PS (108 kW; 145 hp) and 350 Nm. The EE20 diesel engine in the Euro 4 guise was plagued by crankshaft failure caused by cracks forming when operated in cold climate. Although Subaru never acknowledged this defect, the engine was reworked for the Euro 5 model in 2011 to fix this problem.

In the UK, the gasoline-powered Forester was offered in the popular X and XS models, while the trim levels for the diesel models were X, XC, and XS NavPlus.

In Russia, Belarus, and Ukraine 2.5 and 2.5 Turbo engines were also available.

In the Netherlands, the Forester is offered with gasoline or diesel engines. The gasoline engine can also be fitted with an additional liquefied petroleum gas installation (LPG), an aftermarket installation provided directly through dealerships. The available equipment levels are Intro (gasoline engine only), Comfort, Luxury, Premium, and XT (gasoline engine turbo). Maximum towing abilities for the gasoline or gasoline with LPG are 2000 kg (manual) or 1500 kg (auto), while the manual-only diesel can tow 2000 kg.

=== Australia ===
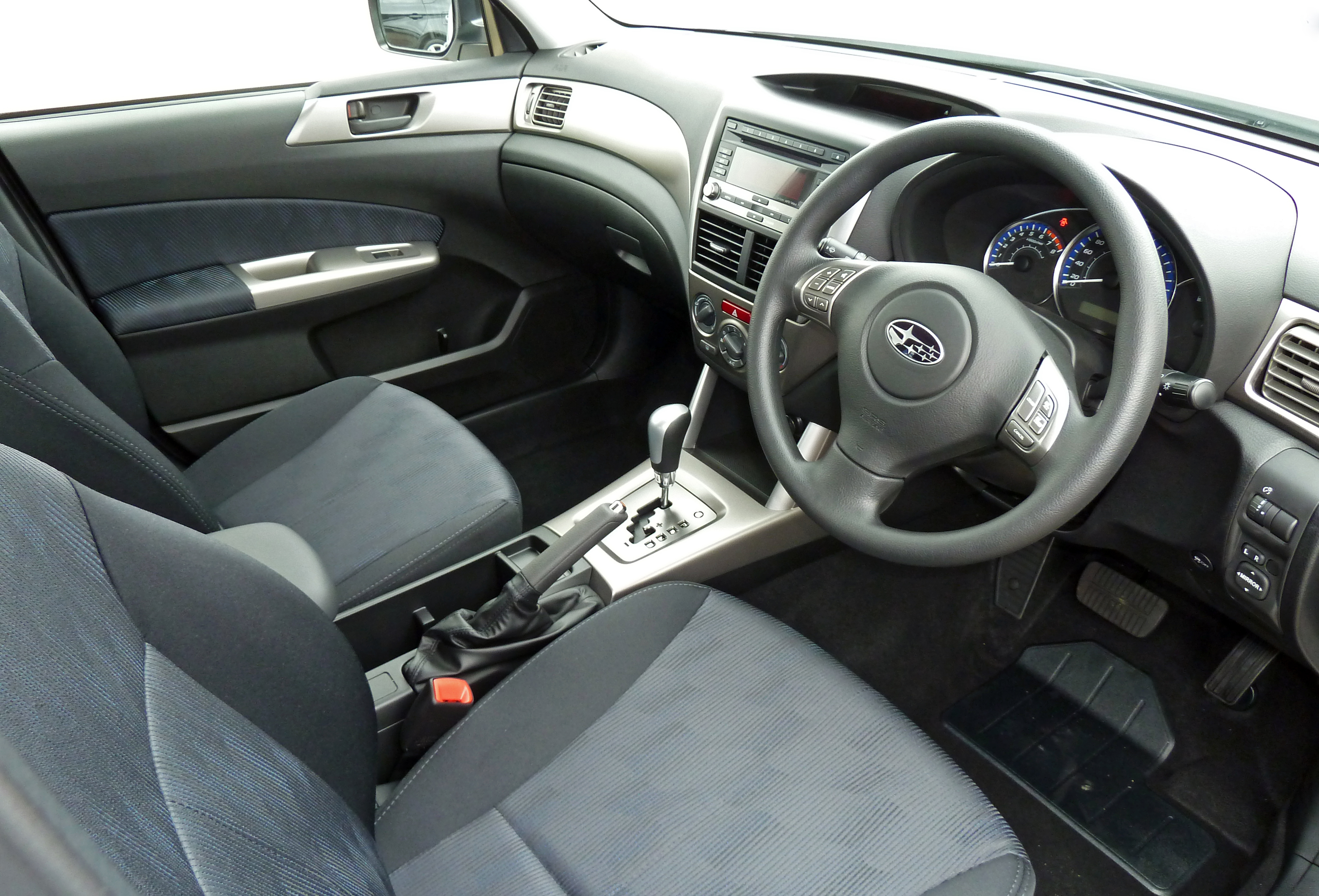
Interior

There were seven specifications with various trim and performance levels:

- X: Base model - naturally aspirated 2.5 L flat-4, 126 kW (169 hp) 229 Nm (169 ft-lbf)
- XS: Lower luxury non-turbo model - naturally aspirated 2.5 L flat-4, 126 kW (169 hp) 229 Nm (169 ft-lbf)
- XS Premium: luxury non-turbo model - naturally aspirated 2.5 L flat-4, 126 kW (169 hp) 229 Nm (169 ft-lbf)
- 2.0 Diesel: turbo-diesel 2.0 L flat-4, 108 kW (145 hp) 350 Nm (258 ft-lbf)
- 2.0 Premium Diesel: Premium - turbo-diesel 2.0 L flat-4, 108 kW (145 hp) 350 Nm (258 ft-lbf)
- XT: Lower luxury turbo model - turbocharged 2.5 L flat-4, 169 kW (227 hp) 320 Nm (236 ft-lbf)
- XT Premium: luxury turbo model - turbocharged 2.5 L flat-4, 169 kW (227 hp) 320 Nm (236 ft-lbf)
- S-Edition: - turbocharged 2.5 L flat-4 193 kW (259 hp) 347 Nm (256 ft-lbf)

Summary of standard trim and equipment over different Australian models.

- Wheels and tires – The X model came with 16-inch steel wheels, the 2.0 diesel model with 16-inch alloys, all other models came with 17-inch alloy wheels. The S-Edition comes with STi-style wheels.
- Suspension – The X model came with double-wishbone type, independent rear suspension. All other models came with self-leveling double-wishbone type, independent suspension on the rear.
- Miscellaneous – The Premium versions of the 2.0 diesel, XS, and XT models came with leather seating and an electric sunroof. These items were not available as options on other models.
- Transmission. The X came with either a dual-range, five-speed manual transmission or a four-speed automatic transmission. Both diesel models come with a six-speed manual transmission only. All other models came with either a single-range, five-speed manual or four-speed automatic transmission. The S-Edition has a 5-speed Automatic Transmission.
- Entertainment – The XT Premium came with a multi-information in-dash satellite navigation system and a single CD/DVD player (7-inch touch screen). The X and 2.0 diesel came with an AM/FM radio, CD player (MP3 and WMA compatible), four-speaker stereo (tweeters and subwoofer optional extra). All other models came with an AM/FM radio, a six-stack in-dash CD player (MP3 and WMA compatible), and a six-speaker SRS stereo system with a subwoofer. The system from the XT Premium was optional on all other models, but cost A$4851.50 (fitted).

=== United States ===
The Forester trim levels were the 2.5X Limited, the 2.5X Premium, the 2.5X, and the 2.5XT Limited and 2.5XT Premium both with turbo. The interior color was either black or light gray, with three upholstery selections, including leather. Nine exterior colors were offered, with four colors in a pearlescent appearance.

Starting July 2009, Subaru no longer offered a special-edition L.L. Bean trim level on the Forester. The Subaru Elaion is a modified Subaru Forester which was built by Subaru and Elaion (Repsol-YPF).

The USA 2.5X model was certified PZEV emissions (rated 175 hp (130.5 kW) instead of 170 hp (126.8 kW)), with a badge attached to the rear of the vehicle on the bottom right-hand side of the tailgate. All other USA models were certified LEV2. The PZEV Forester was available for sale in all fifty states, unlike other manufacturers who only sold PZEV-certified vehicles in states that had adopted California emission standards. The naturally aspirated engine runs on unleaded gasoline rated at 87 octane; the turbo engine (EJ255) requires premium fuel rated minimum 91 octane.

Safety equipment included front airbags with side curtain airbags and front passenger-side airbags (for a total of six airbags) and brake assist that detects panic-braking situations and applies maximum braking force more quickly. The five-speed manual transmission was equipped with Incline Start Assist.

Some of the standard equipment found on the 2.5X included Subaru's VDC (Vehicle Dynamics Control), 16 inch steel wheels, and an auxiliary audio jack for MP3 players. Optional equipment included 17 inch alloy wheels, panoramic moonroof, heated front seats, and heated side-view mirrors. The L.L. Bean edition added automatic climate control, leather upholstery, an upgraded stereo with six speakers and a six-disc in-dash CD changer over the four-speaker stereo with single-disc CD player, and an in-dash navigation system, as well as L.L. Bean signature floor mats and rear cargo tray.

The 2.5 XT came with the premium stereo standard, as well as 17-inch alloy wheels, and the panoramic moonroof. The 2.5 XT Limited added leather upholstery with heated front seats, in-dash navigation, a rear spoiler, and automatic climate control. For 2009, XT models came only with a four-speed automatic with Sport Shift.

=== Forester XTI concept ===
The Forester XTI concept vehicle used the 2.5-liter inter-cooled turbo engine from the Subaru WRX STI, six-speed manual transmission, 18 × 8-inch S204 forged alloy wheels with Yokohama Advan Neova 255/40R18 performance tires, adjustable coil-over suspension, Brembo brakes with four-piston front calipers, 2-piston rear calipers, SuperSport ABS and Electronic Brake-force Distribution (EBD), leather and Alcantara sport seats, a special instrument cluster, front dash, and center console and leather-wrapped steering wheel. Engine is rated 315 hp (235 kW) and 300 lb⋅ft (407 N⋅m) torque.

The vehicle was unveiled in the 2008 SEMA Show.

=== Mountain Rescue Vehicle ===
Subaru produced a specialized vehicle for the National Ski Patrol based on the 2.5XT turbo. It includes diamond plate floor, rear steel walls, a 9,500-pound winch and a roof-mounted toboggan. The vehicle was unveiled in the 2008 SEMA Show.

=== Facelift ===
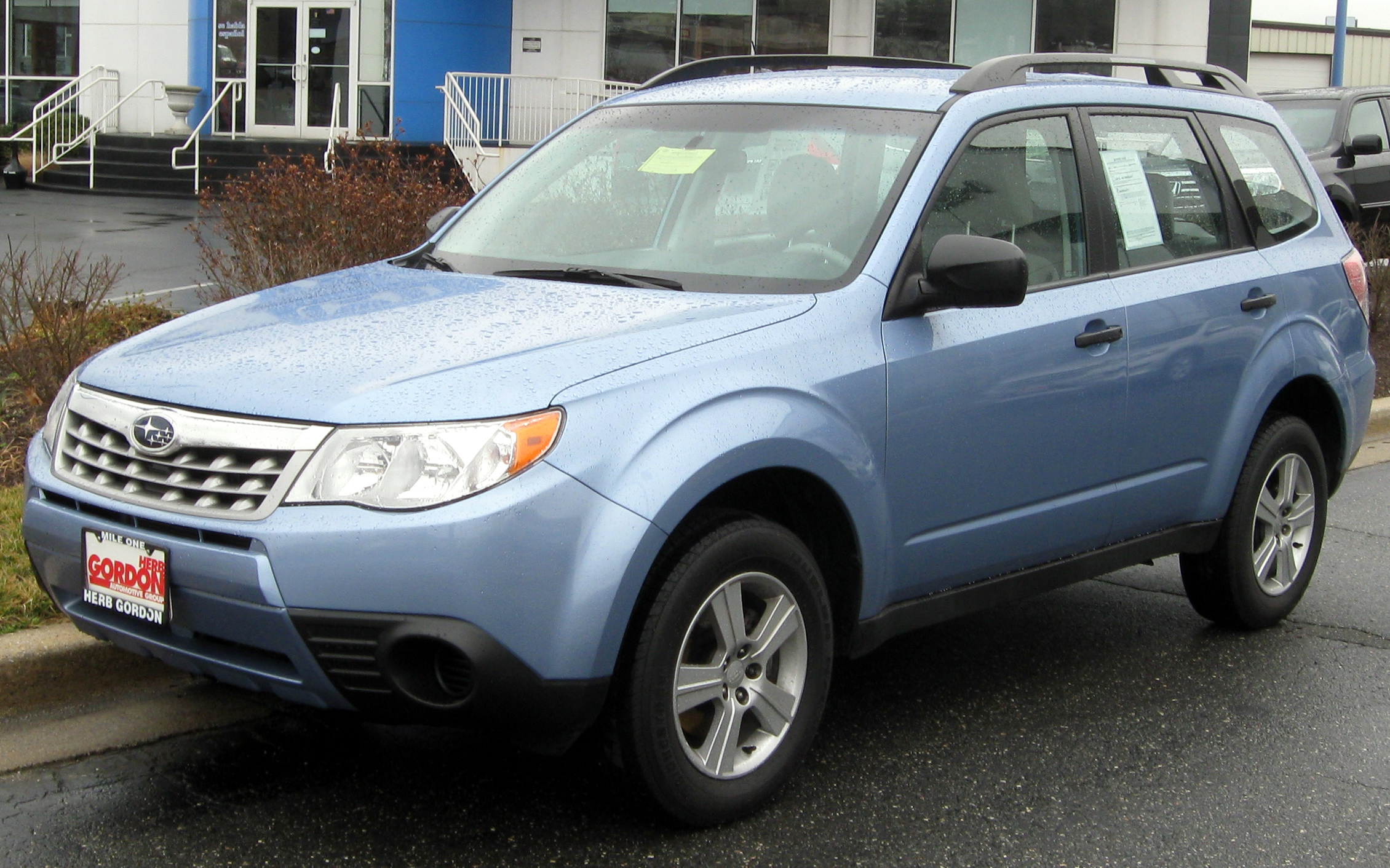
Facelift (front)

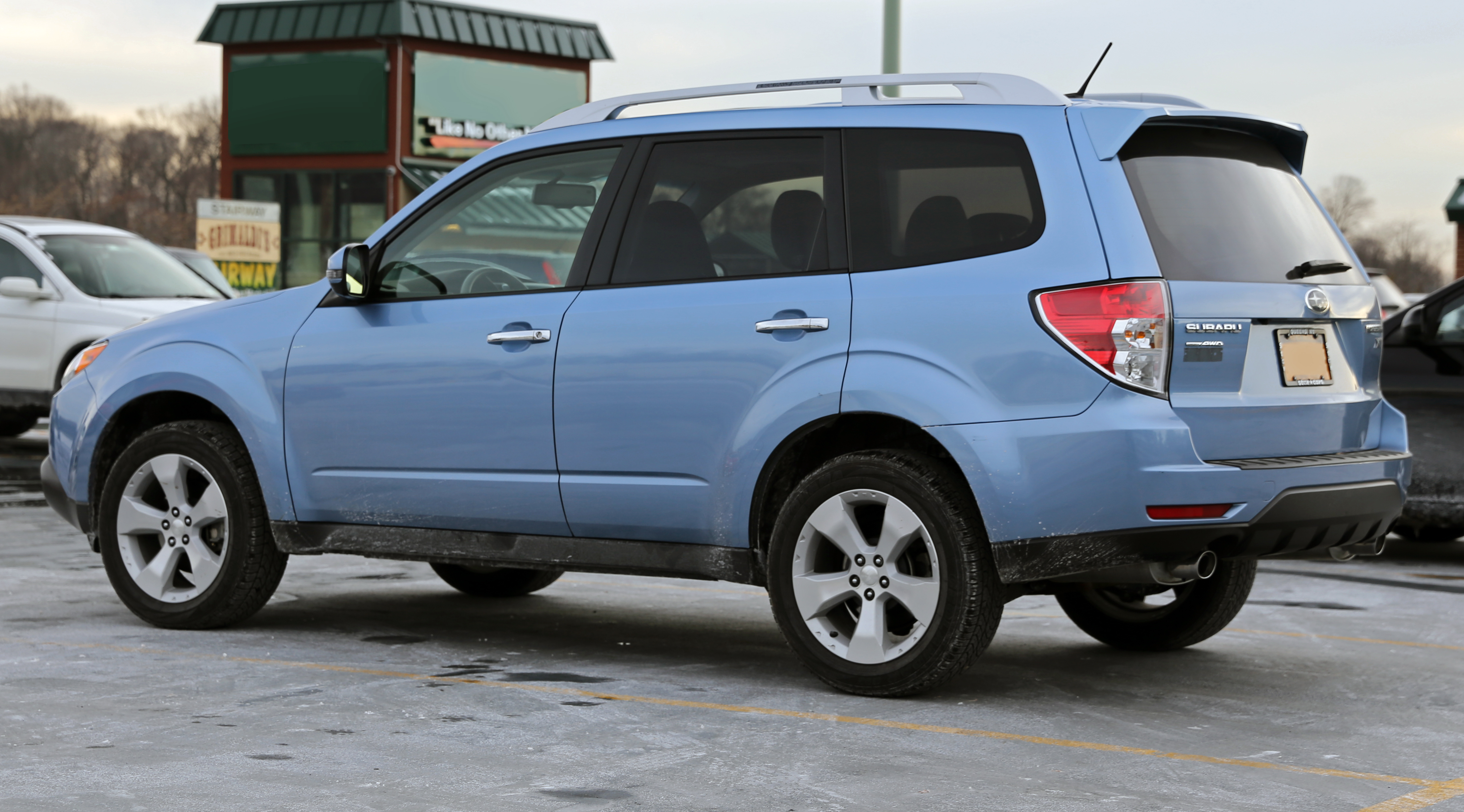
Facelift (rear)

In 2010 (U.S. 2011 model year), the Subaru Forester received a minor facelift featuring a new grille insert and several small changes in various trim levels. A new 2.5X Touring trim level was also introduced above the 2.5X Limited. The 2.5X Touring trim added HID lighting, a rearview camera, dual-zone climate control, and silver roof rails. 2.5XT models got a slightly larger rear roof spoiler.

Subaru also quietly switched to the all-new 2.5L DOHC FB25 third-generation boxer engine in naturally aspirated Forester models. The new engine made the same 170 hp (130 kW) as the outgoing EJ253, but torque increased by 4 to 174 lb⋅ft (5.4 to 235.9 N⋅m). Fuel economy improved by 1 mpg EPA city/highway to 21/27. 2.5XT models retained the 2.5L DOHC EJ255 turbo engine.

=== Safety ===
ANCAP test results* Subaru Forester (2008)
| Test | Score |
|---|---|
| Overall | 5 /5 stars |
| Frontal offset | 14.31/16 |
| Side impact | 16/16 |
| Pole | 2/2 |
| Seat belt reminders | 2/3 |
| Whiplash protection | Not Assessed |
| Pedestrian protection | Adequate |
| Electronic stability control | Standard |

== Fourth generation (SJ; 2012) ==
Fourth generation
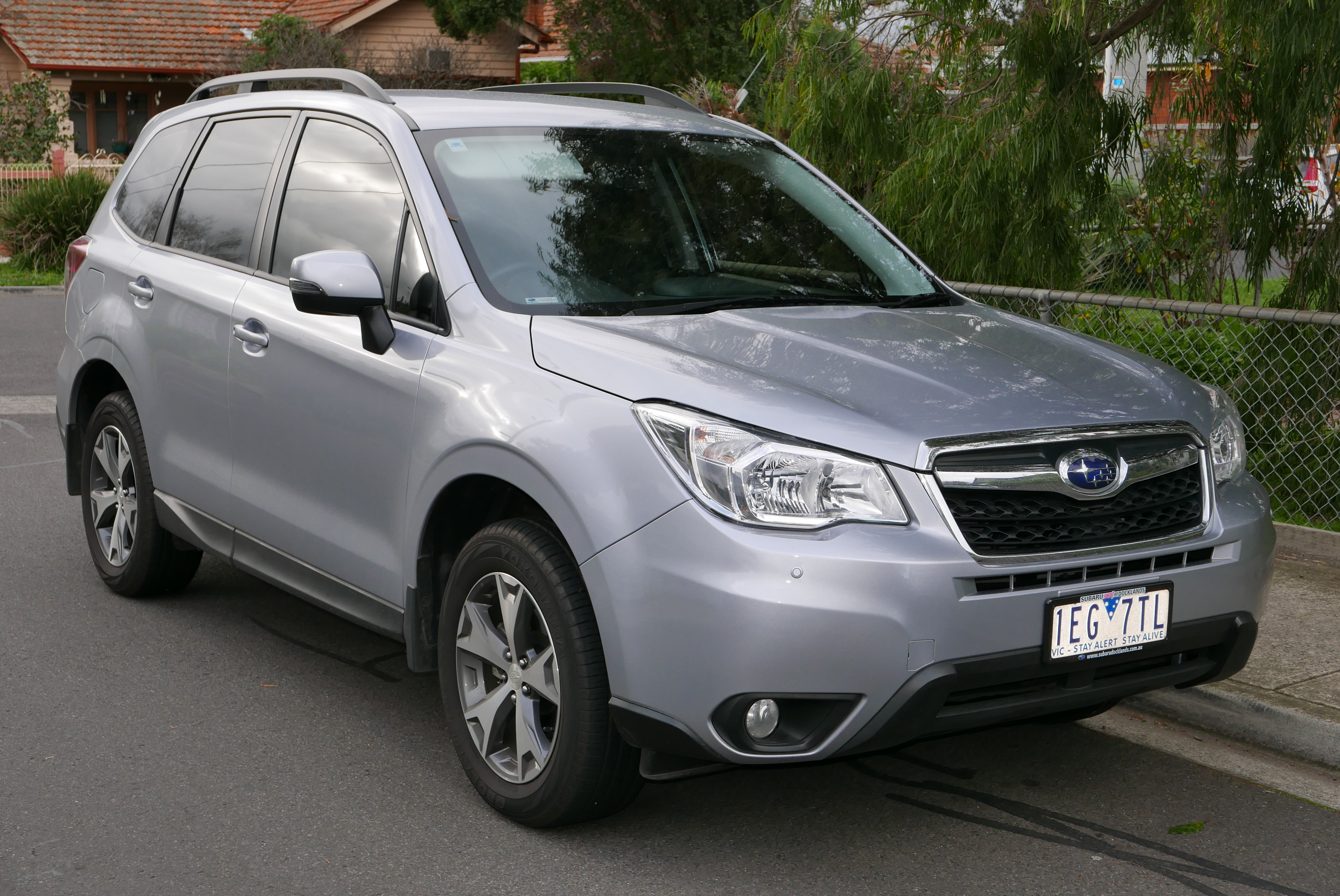
- Pre-facelift

Overview
- Model code: SJ
- Production: 2012–2018
- Model years: 2014–2018
- Assembly: Japan: Ōta, Gunma; Malaysia: Kuala Lumpur (TCMA)

Powertrain
- Engine: Gasoline: 2.0 L FB20 H4; 2.5 L FB25 H4; 2.0 L FA20F H4; Diesel: 2.0 L EE20 H4 turbo
- Transmission: 6-speed manual; Lineartronic CVT

Dimensions
- Wheelbase: 2,640 mm (103.9 in)
- Length: 4,595 mm (180.9 in)
- Width: 1,796 mm (70.7 in)
- Height: 1,732 mm (68.2 in)
- Curb weight: 3,296 to 3,717 lb (1,495 to 1,686 kg)

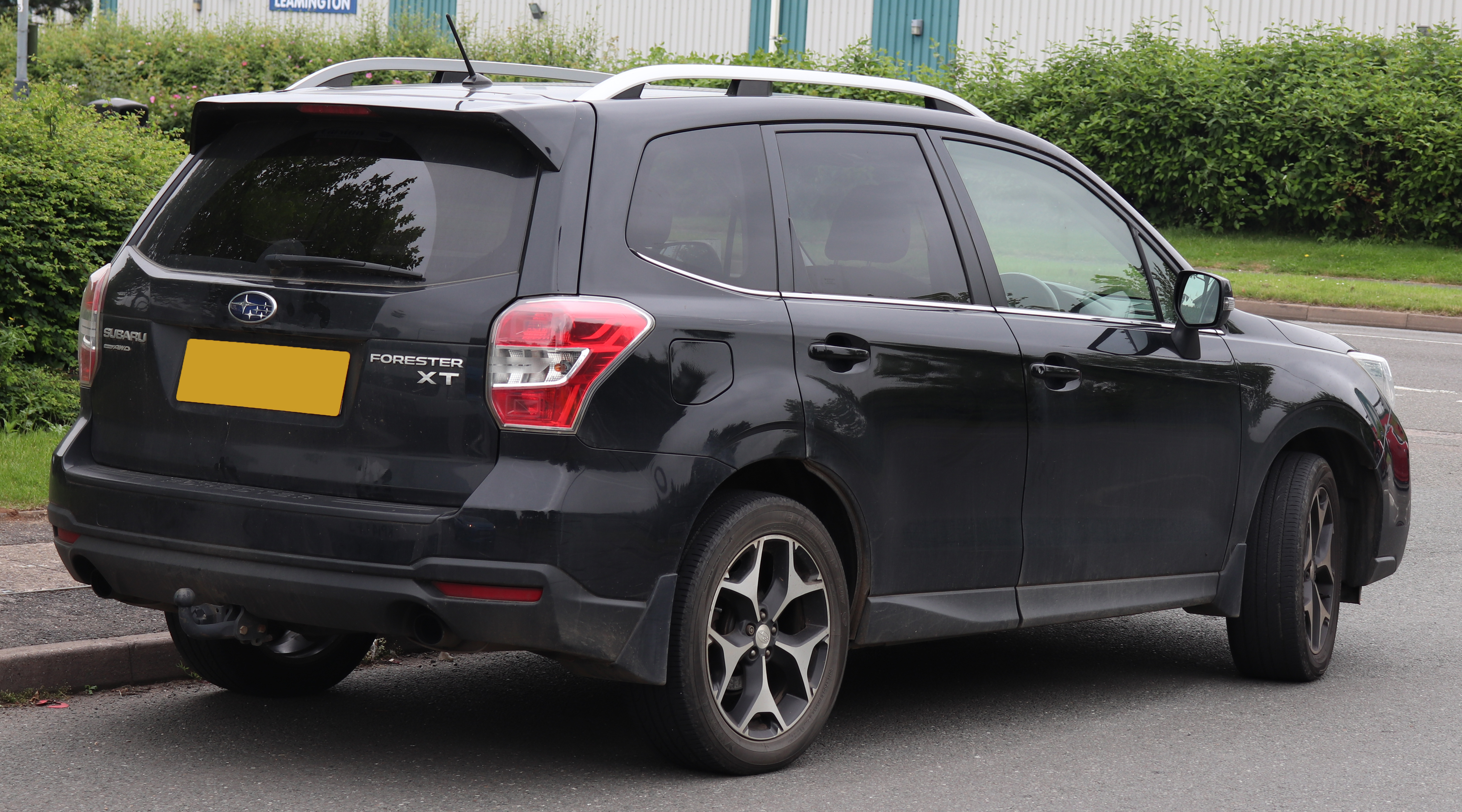
Forester XT (pre-facelift)

The fourth-generation Forester was unveiled at the November 2012 Guangzhou Motor Show, followed by the 2013 New York International Auto Show.

The fourth-generation model had a major revamp of interior comfort. The passenger seat is higher, the sound system has been upgraded, the rear bench seats are higher and the console is re-positioned for the person riding in the center. The manual transmission models were also upgraded to a six-speed transmission instead of the previous generation's five-speed transmission.

Changes to the line-up include:

- Continuously Variable Transmission and decreased towing capacity. Maximum towing capacity was reduced to 1,500 lb (680 kg) across all trim lines (in the United States; in other countries, the towing capacity is double that). Turbocharged variants use a high-torque CVT with optional steering wheel paddle shifter controls.
- Revised, sport-oriented suspension, wheels (18-inch), and chassis bracing for XT (turbo) variant, providing flatter cornering in turns and better handling overall with little impact on the ride.
- Increased fuel economy, up to 32 mpg (7.35 L/100 km) highway (EPA rated)
- 1.4 inches longer, 0.6 inches wider, 1 inch longer wheelbase
- Increased interior volume: rear seat legroom is 1,059 mm (41.7 in) and rear cargo volume (with seats folded down) is 74.7 cubic feet (2,115 L).
- New option on higher end CVT models is "X-MODE" AWD control system, which was developed for driving on uneven or slippery road conditions. Engine, Transmission and VDC are controlled cooperatively.
- New option on top-of-the-line 2.5i and 2.0XT Touring models only: EyeSight Driver Assist System

Japan models went on sale in November 2012. Early models include the 2.0i, 2.0i-L, 2.0i-L EyeSight, 2.0i-S EyeSight, 2.0XT (280 PS), and the 2.0XT EyeSight (280 PS). The 2.0i engine models include six-speed manual (2.0i, 2.0i-L) or Lineartronic CVT transmission; 2.0XT (280 PS) engine models include Lineartronic CVT transmission.

Asian models went on sale in March 2013 as the 2014 model year. Early models include 2.0i-L, 2.0i Premium and 2.0XT. Association of Southeast Asian Nations production of the Subaru Forester began in February 2016. Malaysia-based Tan Chong Motor Assemblies assembled approximately 10,000 Forester units annually for Malaysia, Thailand and Indonesia respectively.

US models went on sale in March 2013 as 2014 model year vehicles. Early models include 2.5i in base, Premium, Limited and top-line Touring versions, and performance-oriented turbocharged 2.0XT (253 PS) in Premium and Touring versions. Base and Premium model 2014 Foresters can be equipped with the manual six-speed transmission or the Lineartronic CVT. All other models are equipped with the Lineartronic CVT. An option on Limited/Touring 2.5i and Premium/Touring 2.0XT is new X-Mode control and Hill Descent Control (HDC) features. These are not available on other models.

The 2014 Forester has a new feature called X Mode that allows owners to go through more extreme conditions both on the road and off. The concept is that any driver, regardless of skill level, can drive safely on wet roads or muddy areas. It works by monitoring wheel-slip on all four wheels; should one or more wheels begin to slip, X Mode kicks in and applies the brakes to the affected wheel which results in a transfer of power to the opposite wheel. After it is engaged by a simple push button, X Mode stays engaged up until the vehicle's speed is about 25 mph (40 km/h) then disengages itself.

It has been awarded Motor Trend's 2009 and 2014 SUV of the Year and The Car Connection's Best Car To Buy 2014.

=== Safety ===
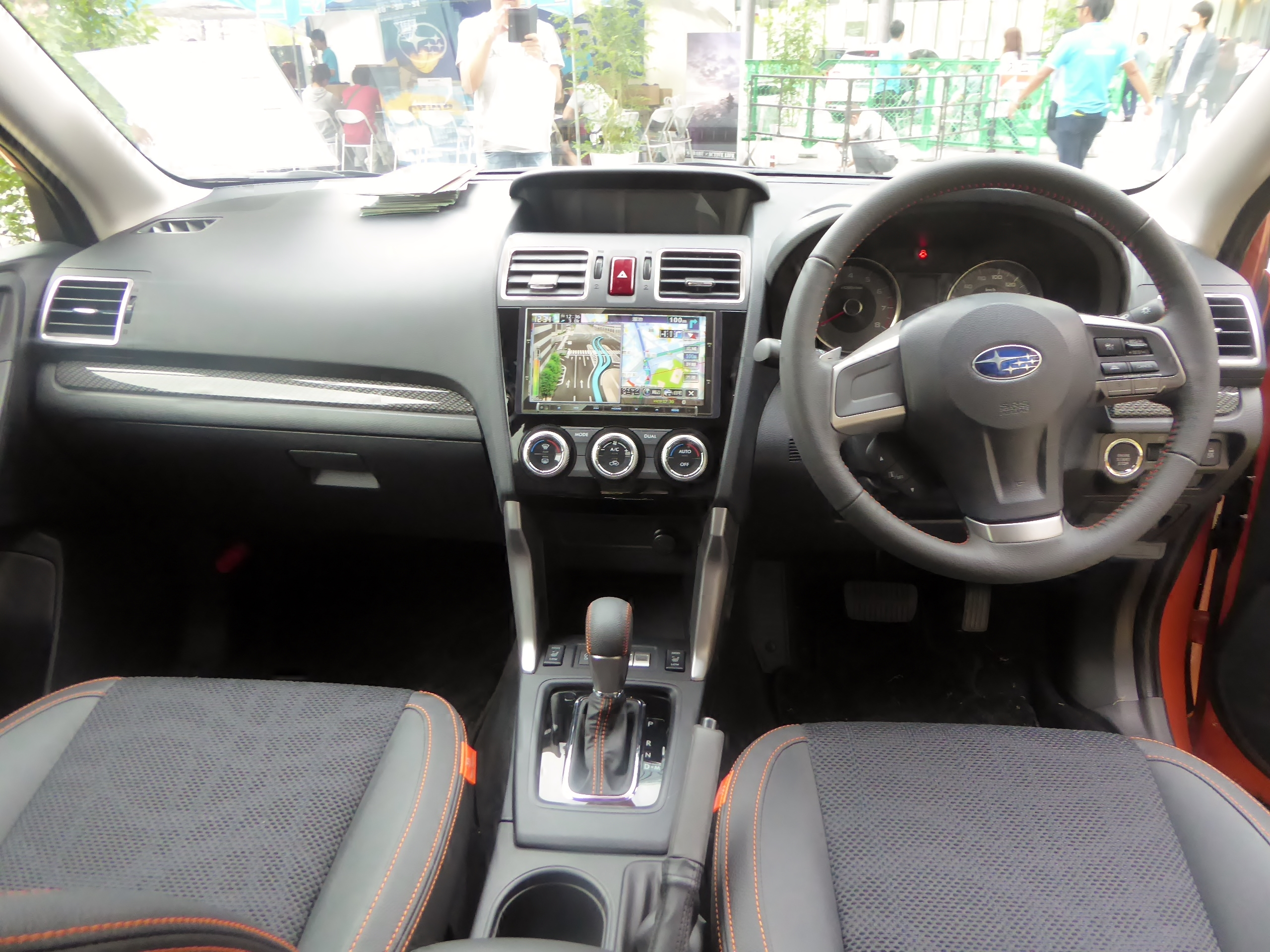
Interior

According to IIHS (Insurance Institute for Highway Safety), the 2014 Forester achieved Good crash test ratings in Small Overlap Front, Moderate Overlap Front, Side, Roof Strength, and Head Restraining & Seats categories. The Forester had not been rated Good in the Small Overlap Front test until modifications were made for the 2014 model year. The small overlap test, introduced in 2012 by the IIHS, simulates a frontal collision on 25 percent of the driver's side front corner. Since its adoption, the IIHS has noticed several automakers making non-symmetrical modifications to their vehicles. Another small overlap test was conducted on a number of vehicles, including a 2014 Forester, but was conducted on the passenger side instead. The crash test showed substantially more intrusion into the passenger side than into the driver's side of the Forester, it would have been rated Marginal.

Euro NCAP test results* Subaru Forester 2.0i-L (LHD) (2012)
| Test | Points | % |
|---|---|---|
| Overall: | 5 /5 stars | |
| Adult occupant: | 32.8 | 91% |
| Child occupant: | 44.5 | 91% |
| Pedestrian: | 26.3 | 73% |
| Safety assist: | 6 | 86% |

ANCAP test results* Subaru Forester (2013)
| Test | Score |
|---|---|
| Overall | 5 /5 stars |
| Frontal offset | 14.64/16 |
| Side impact | 16/16 |
| Pole | 2/2 |
| Seat belt reminders | 3/3 |
| Whiplash protection | Good |
| Pedestrian protection | Adequate |
| Electronic stability control | Standard |

=== EyeSight Driver Assist System ===
The 2014 top-of-the-line Touring model Forester in the U.S. offers Subaru's EyeSight driver assist technology that uses stereoscopic CCD cameras mounted on either side of the rearview mirror. Eyesight offers several driver assist technologies/features which include:

- Pre-Collision Braking System
- Pre-Collision Throttle Management
- Adaptive Cruise Control
- Lane Departure and Sway Warning

The system can be manually turned on or off. Being an optical, instead of radar, based system, it has limitations in limited visibility situations; driving into the sun, fog, or where the windshield is not cleared (snow, mud, etc.) may cause the system to disengage.

=== Facelift ===
The facelifted fourth-generation Forester was revealed in October 2015 ahead of the 2015 Tokyo Motor Show. Changes include new LED projector headlights with C-shaped positioning lights, new taillights, a redesigned grille and a reprofiled front bumper.

Subaru also introduced improvements to the Forester's AWD chassis and NVH. It also feature greater front cross member rigidity and optimization of the rear trailing link bushings which result in better steering response and straight-line stability. The turbo model gets Active Torque Vectoring. Ride comfort has been improved with optimized dampers and spring rates, while thicker door glass, stronger sealing, additional under-floor insulation and improvements to the Lineartronic CVT gearbox result in quieter ride. The FB 2.0-liter naturally aspirated flat-four gasoline engine with 148 PS (109 kW; 146 hp) has been given more efficient combustion and reduced friction for better fuel efficiency with no loss of performance.

The Forester uses color cameras for the EyeSight system with a wider and longer field of view. Alongside EyeSight which was upgraded to Version 3, Subaru offered a Rear Vehicle Detection package that includes Blind Spot Detection, Lane Change Assist and Rear Cross Traffic Alert. The stereo cameras of Eyesight also double up as the eyes for Adaptive Driving Beam.

In the U.S., the facelift was introduced in April 2016 for the 2017 model year.

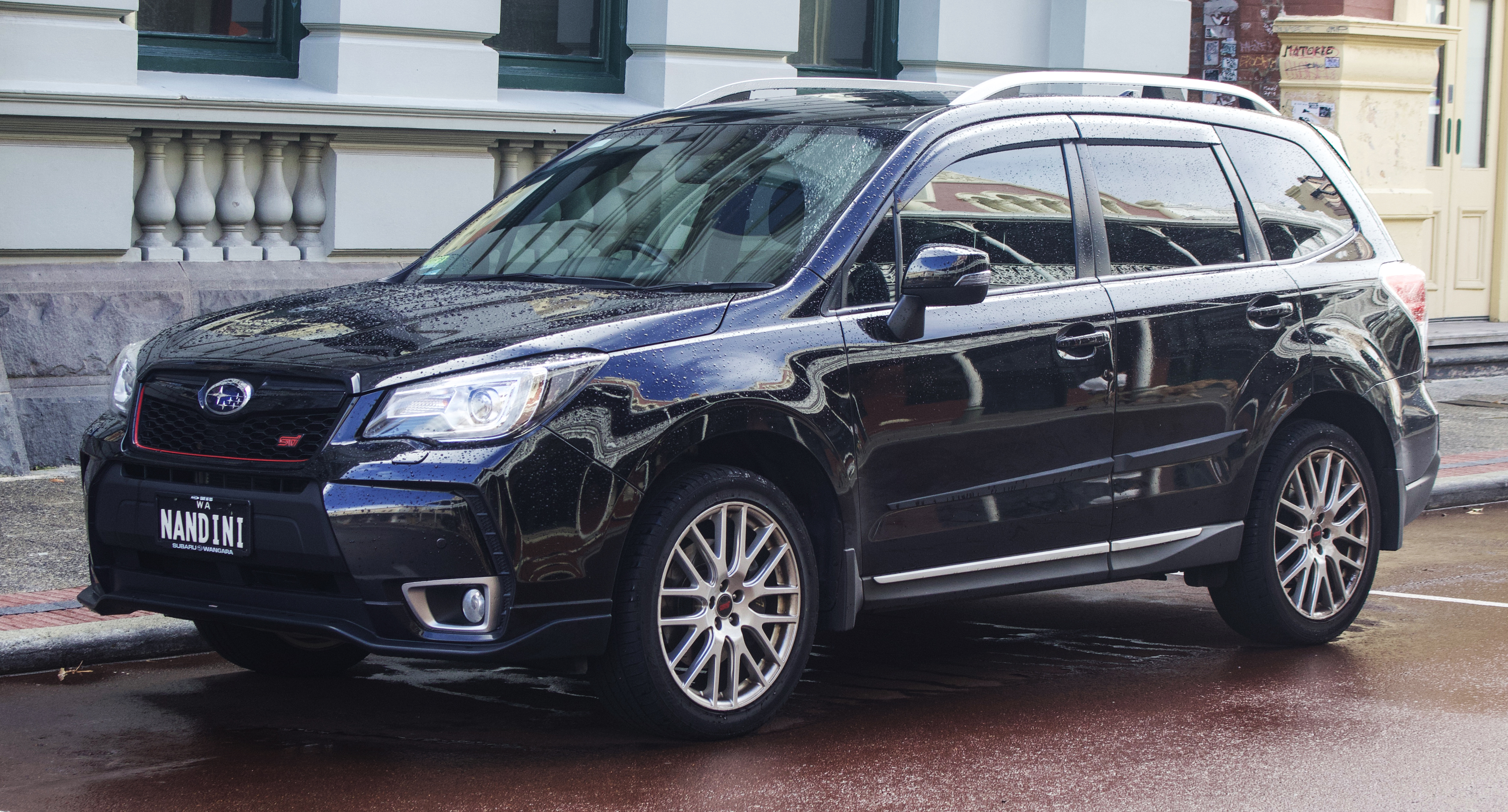
Forester tS STI

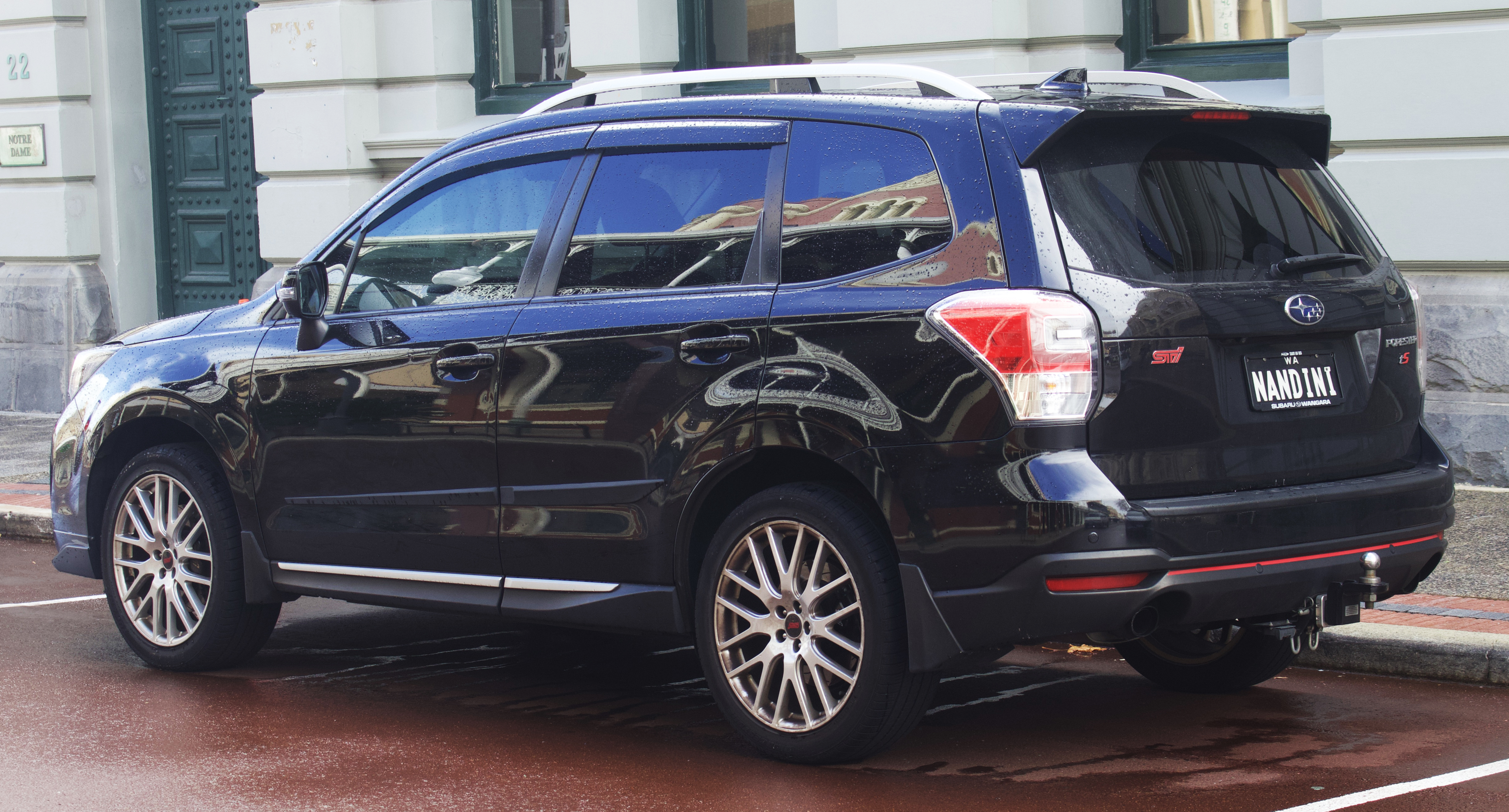
Forester tS STI

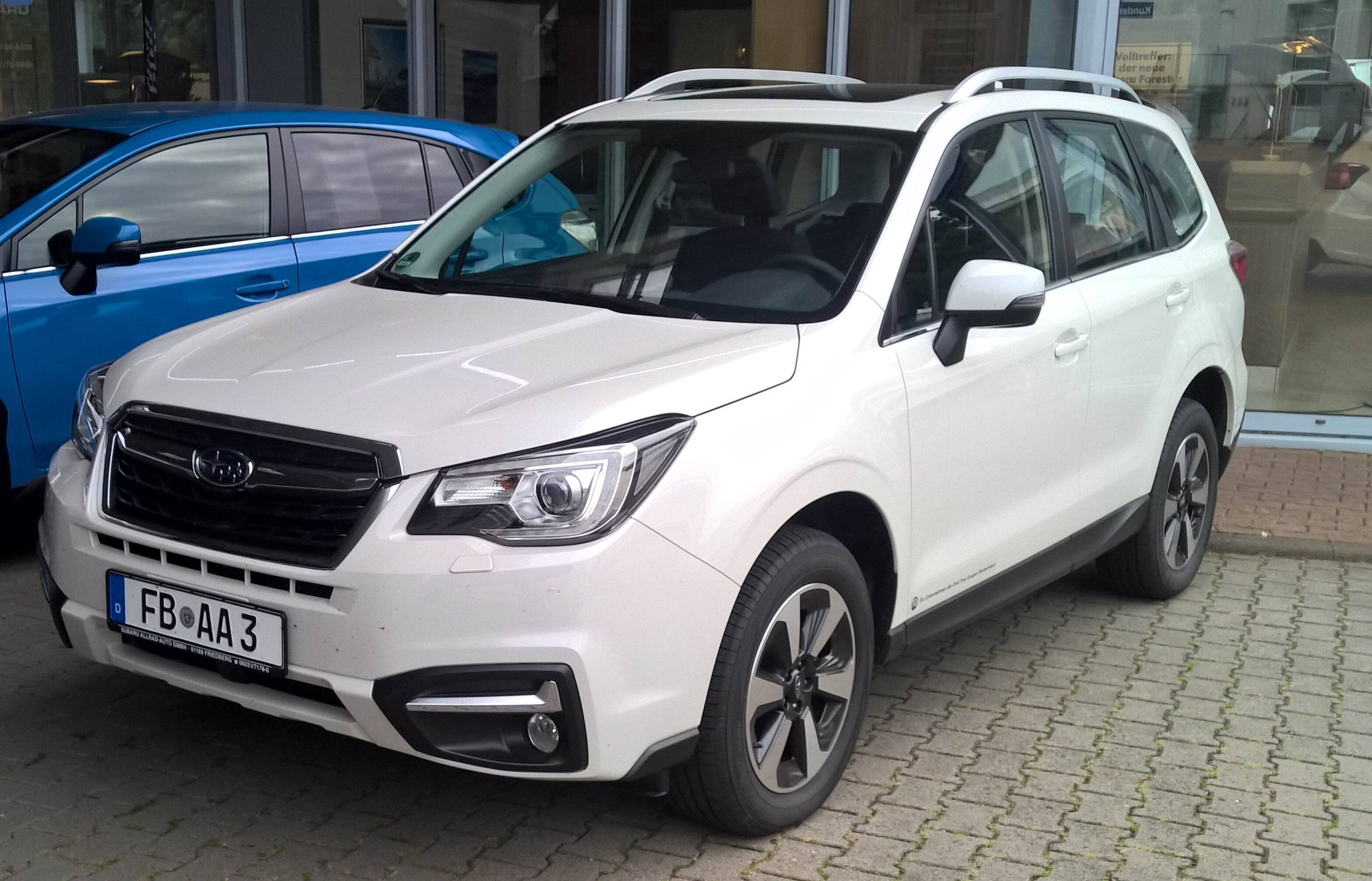
Forester (facelift; Germany)

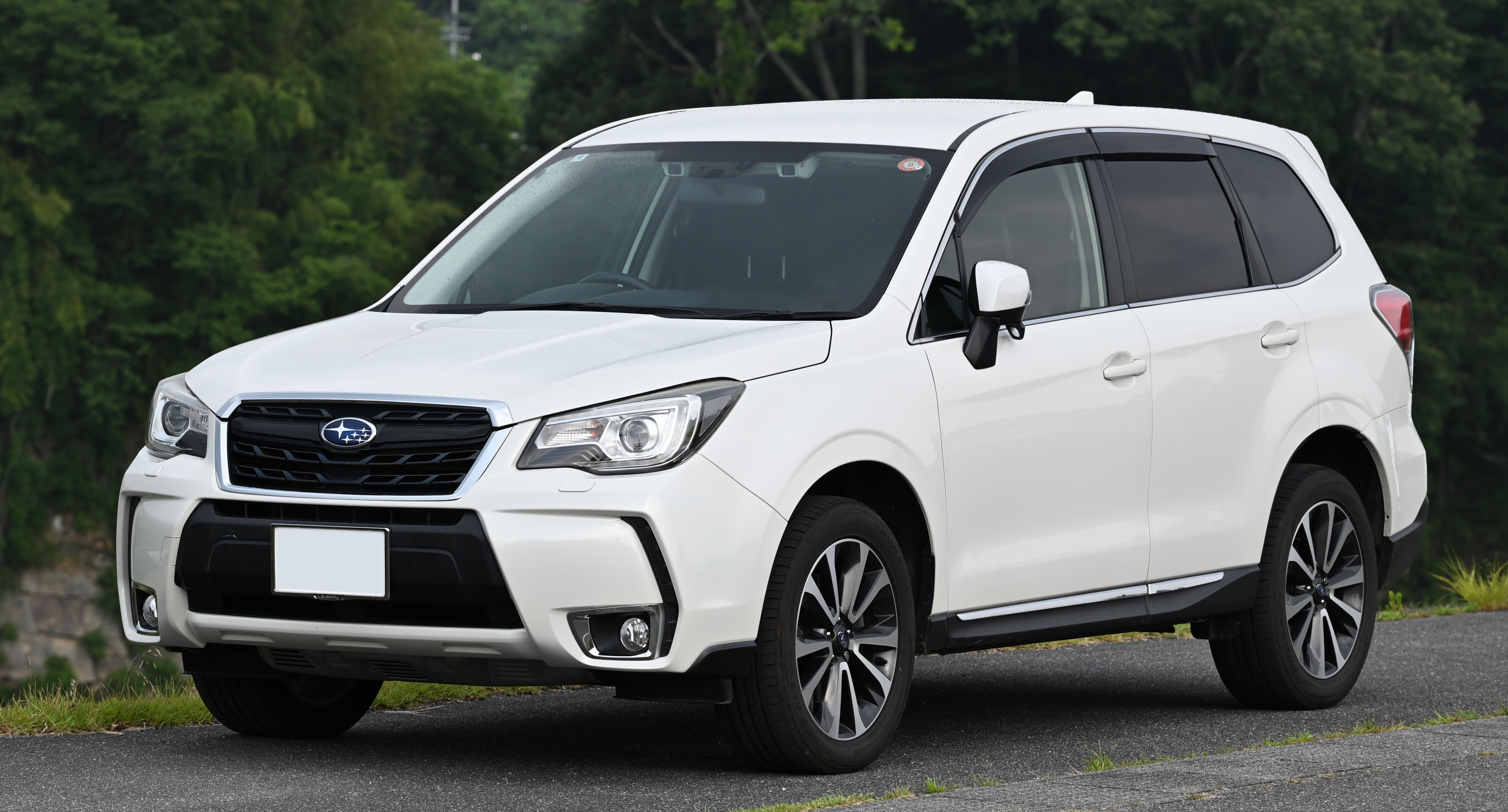
Forester XT (facelift; Japan)

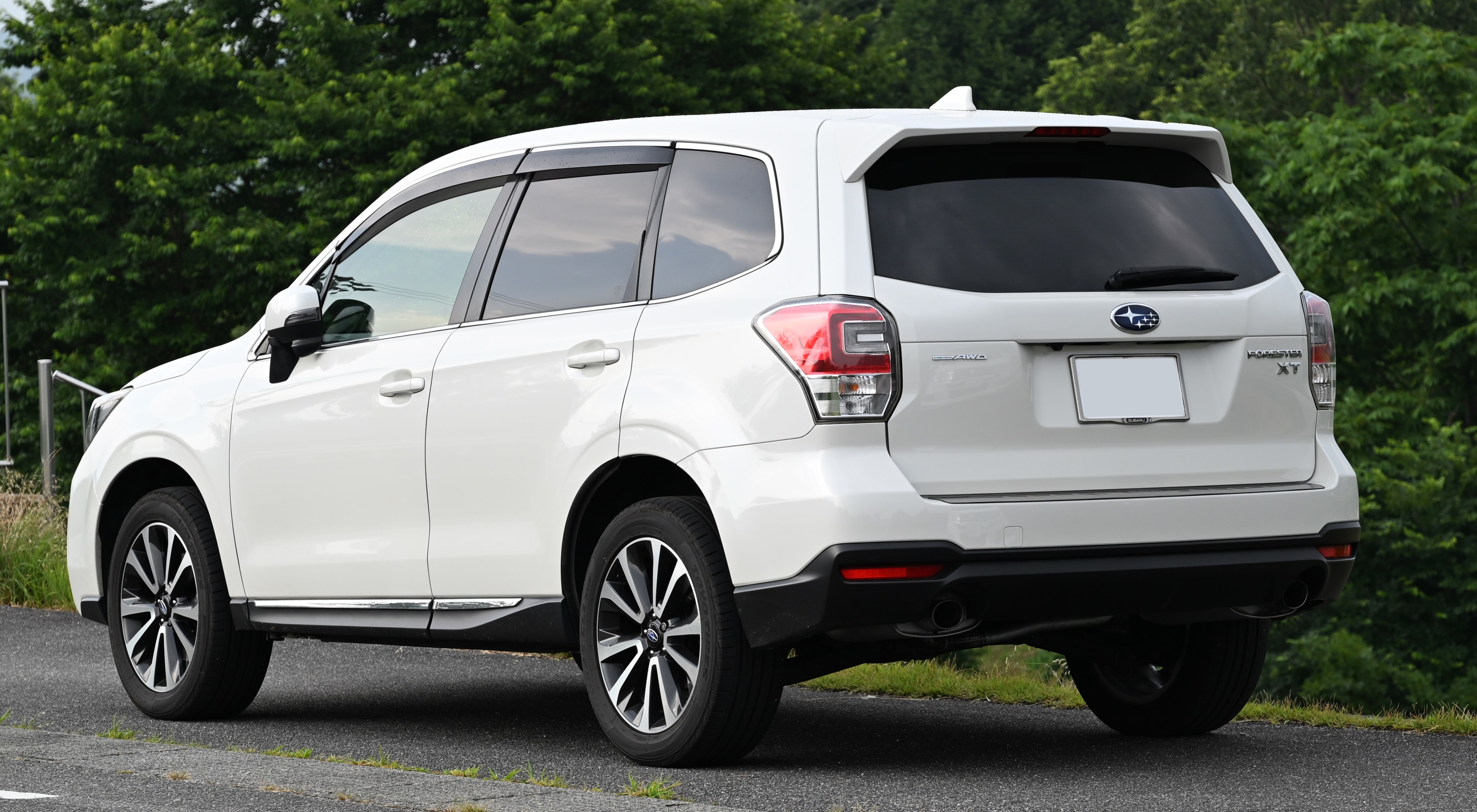
Forester XT (facelift; Japan)

=== Engines ===
Gasoline engines
| Model | Years | Type/code | Power/rpm, Torque/rpm |
|---|---|---|---|
| 2.0i (JDM) | 2012-2018 | 1,995 cc (121.7 cu in) H4 (FB20B) | 109 kW (148 PS; 146 hp) at 6,000, 20.0 kg⋅m (196 N⋅m; 145 lbf⋅ft) at 4,200 |
| 2.5i (USDM) | 2014-2018 | 2,498 cc (152.4 cu in) H4 (FB25) | 127 kW (172 PS; 170 hp) at 5,800, 24.1 kg⋅m (236 N⋅m; 174 lbf⋅ft) at 4,100 |
| 2.0XT (USDM) | 2012–2015 | 1,998 cc (121.9 cu in) H4 (FA20F) | 186 kW (253 PS; 250 hp) at 5,600, 35.7 kg⋅m (350 N⋅m; 258 lbf⋅ft) at 2,000-4,800 |
| 2.0XT (JDM) | 2012–2018 | 1,998 cc (121.9 cu in) H4 (FA20F) | 206 kW (280 PS; 276 hp) at 5,600, 35.7 kg⋅m (350 N⋅m; 258 lbf⋅ft) at 2,000-5,600 |
| 2.0XT (USDM) | 2014–2018 | 1,998 cc (121.9 cu in) H4 (FA20F) | 200 kW (272 PS; 268 hp) at 5,700, 35.7 kg⋅m (350 N⋅m; 258 lbf⋅ft) at 2,000-4,800 |

== Fifth generation (SK; 2018) ==
Fifth generation
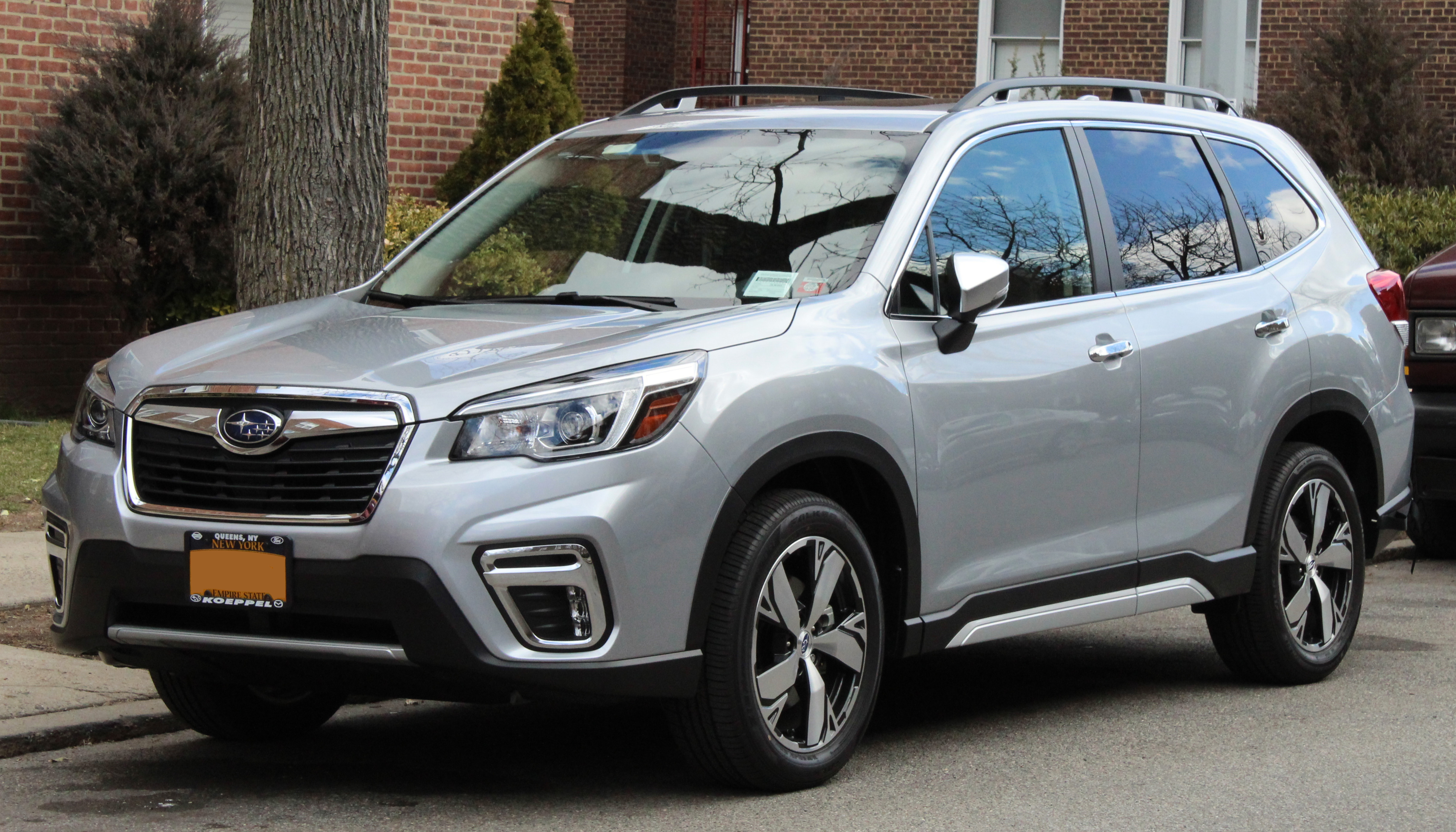
- Pre-facelift

Overview
- Model code: SK
- Production: 2018–2025
- Model years: 2019–2025 (Note: The standard Forester was discontinued after the 2024 model year; only the Forester Wilderness was offered for the 2025 model year.) (North America)
- Assembly: Japan: Ōta, Gunma; Thailand: Bangkok (TCSAT)

Body and chassis
- Platform: Subaru Global Platform

Powertrain
- Engine: Gasoline: 1.8 L CB18 turbo H4; 2.0 L FB20 H4; 2.5 L FB25 DI H4; Gasoline hybrid: 2.0 L FB20D e-Boxer H4
- Electric motor: 12.3 kW (16 hp; 17 PS) (e-Boxer)
- Transmission: Lineartronic CVT
- Hybrid drivetrain: e-Boxer MHEV

Dimensions
- Wheelbase: 2,670 mm (105.1 in)
- Length: 4,625 mm (182.1 in); 4,655 mm (183.3 in) (Forester STI Sport)
- Width: 1,815 mm (71.5 in)
- Height: 1,730 mm (68.1 in)
- Curb weight: 1,564 to 1,627 kg (3,449 to 3,588 lb)

The fifth-generation Forester was presented on March 28, 2018, at the New York International Auto Show. Like contemporary Subaru models, the fifth-generation model moved the Forester to the Subaru Global Platform. The new platform is said to provide greater handling capability, agility, ride comfort and crash protection. It is also claimed to be inherently resistant to noise, vibration and harshness (NVH).

The fifth-generation Forester incorporates Subaru's recent design language, marketed as "Dynamic x Solid". Interior space has been increased with the redesign, by lengthening the wheelbase by 30 to 2,670 mm (1.2 to 105.1 in). Rear legroom has grown by 35 to 1,000 mm (1.4 to 39.4 in), while head, hip and shoulder room have also increased, improving the overall cabin space. Wider rear door openings and a steeper C-pillar allow for easier entry and egress and also makes installing a child seat easier.

The reworked front seats are claimed to be more comfortable on long trips. Subaru also included an electric parking brake which frees up center console space. Cargo space in the trunk is larger with 2,155 litres (76.1 cu ft) with the 60:40-split rear seats folded – an increase of 40 litres (1.4 cu ft) – and the maximum width of the tailgate opening is 135 mm (5.3 in) wider at 1,300 mm (51.2 in).

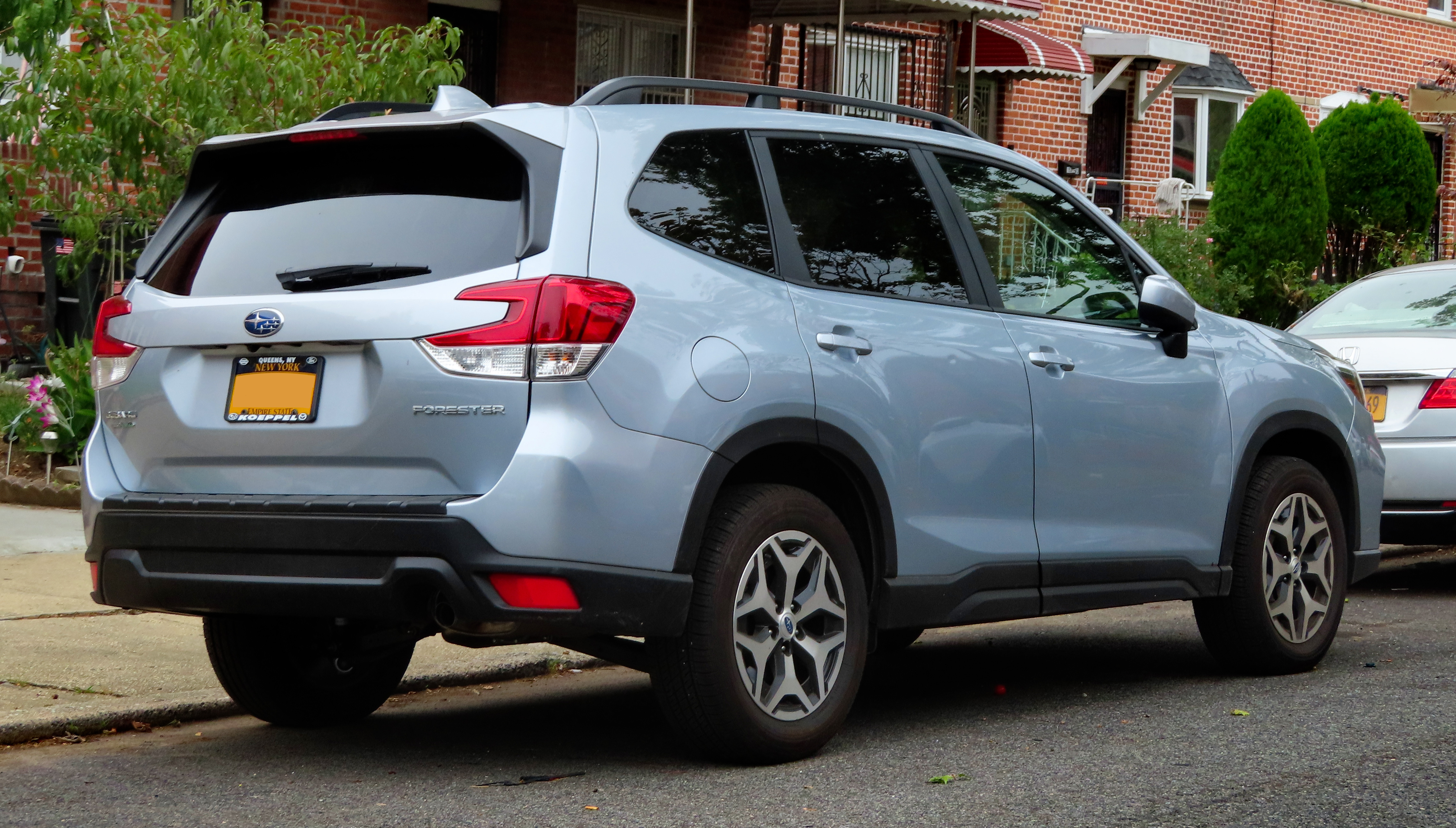
Rear view (pre-facelift)

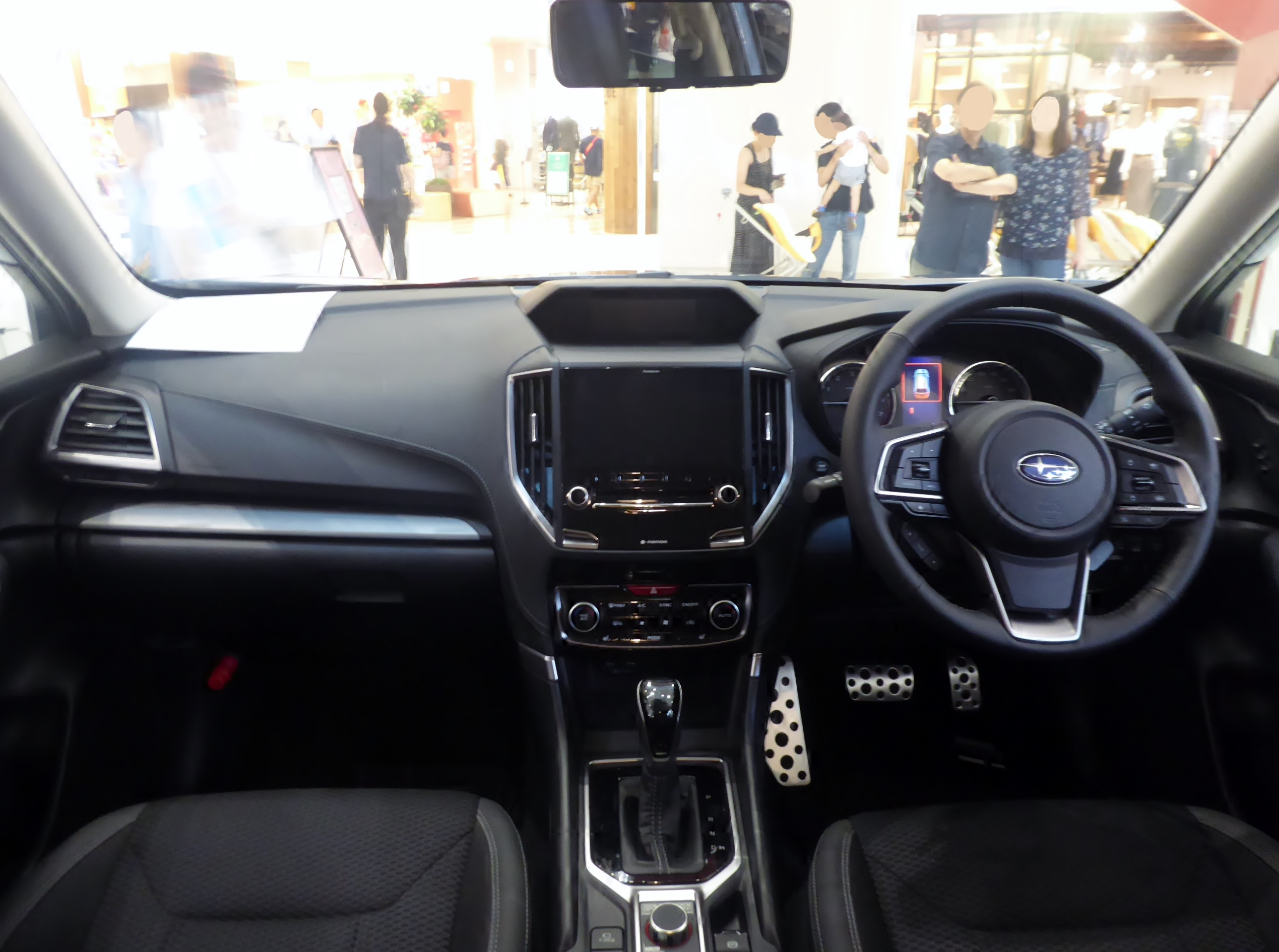
Interior

=== North America ===
Initial trim levels available in the U.S. and Canada are Base, Premium, Sport, Limited and Touring. All Foresters sold in the U.S. come standard with Subaru's Eyesight Driver Assist Technology. Subaru DriverFocus Distraction Mitigation System comes standard on the Touring trim in the U.S., which provides an alert when it detects the driver is distracted or is drowsy. In addition, the DriverFocus system is able to recognize five different drivers and will set seat and mirror positions and climate control settings accordingly.

As standard, the Forester comes with the Starlink Multimedia system with a 6.5-inch touchscreen.

In North America, the model is only available with one engine type: Subaru's new FB25 DI. The engine is a naturally aspirated, direct injection flat (boxer) 4 cylinder producing 182 hp (136 kW; 185 PS) at 5800 rpm and 176 lb⋅ft (239 N⋅m; 24 kg⋅m) at 4400 rpm, with the Lineartronic CVT as the sole transmission option.

All fifth-generation Foresters have one of three versions of Subaru's Symmetrical All Wheel Drive system. The trim levels in North America determines which system is installed. The Base trim received a Variable Torque Distribution (VTD) using electronically controlled clutches to control torque split. Premium, Sport, Limited and Touring trims receive the driver-selectable X-Mode system with Hill Descent Control, which optimizes engine, transmission, AWD system and Vehicle Dynamics Control for maximum traction on slippery conditions. A new dual-mode version with Snow/Dirt and Deep Snow/Mud modes is fitted on Sport, Limited and Touring variants. All models provide a nominal torque split biased 60 front to 40 rear.

=== Forester e-Boxer ===
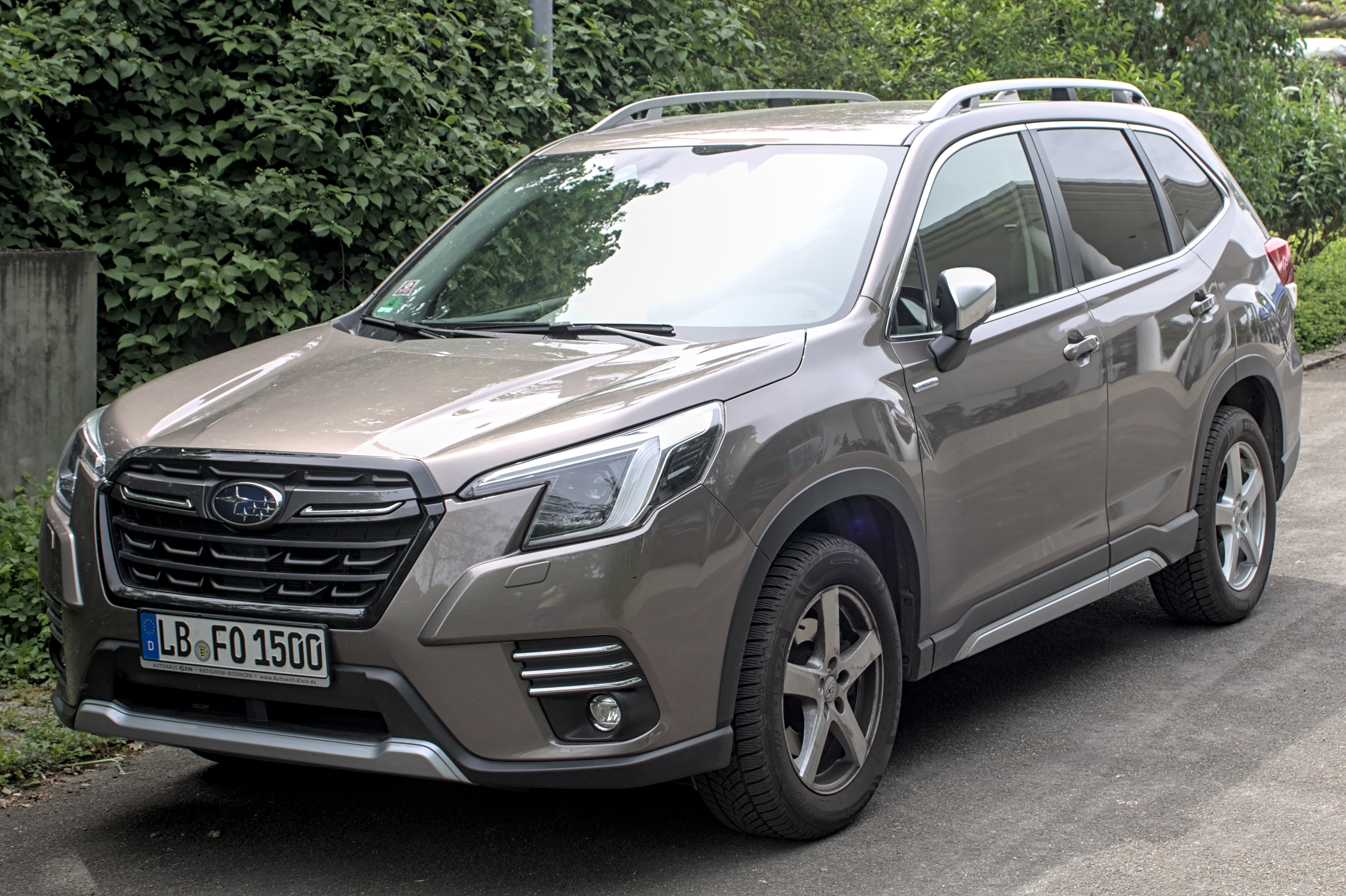
Forester e-Boxer (Europe)

Subaru introduced the e-Boxer hybrid powertrain for the European-market Forester and XV at the Geneva Motor Show in March 2019; the e-Boxer integrates an electric motor into the Lineartronic CVT to improve fuel economy and increase power.

The e-Boxer powertrain features a modified FB20 rated at 110 kW (148 hp; 150 PS) at 5,600–6,000 rpm and 194 N⋅m (143 lb⋅ft; 20 kg⋅m) of torque at 4,000 rpm. Like the first-generation XV Crosstrek Hybrid, the Forester e-Boxer adds a single electric motor rated at 12.3 kW (16 hp; 17 PS) maximum output. The battery for the traction motor is placed above the rear axle, improving the front/rear weight balance.

=== Forester Sport ===
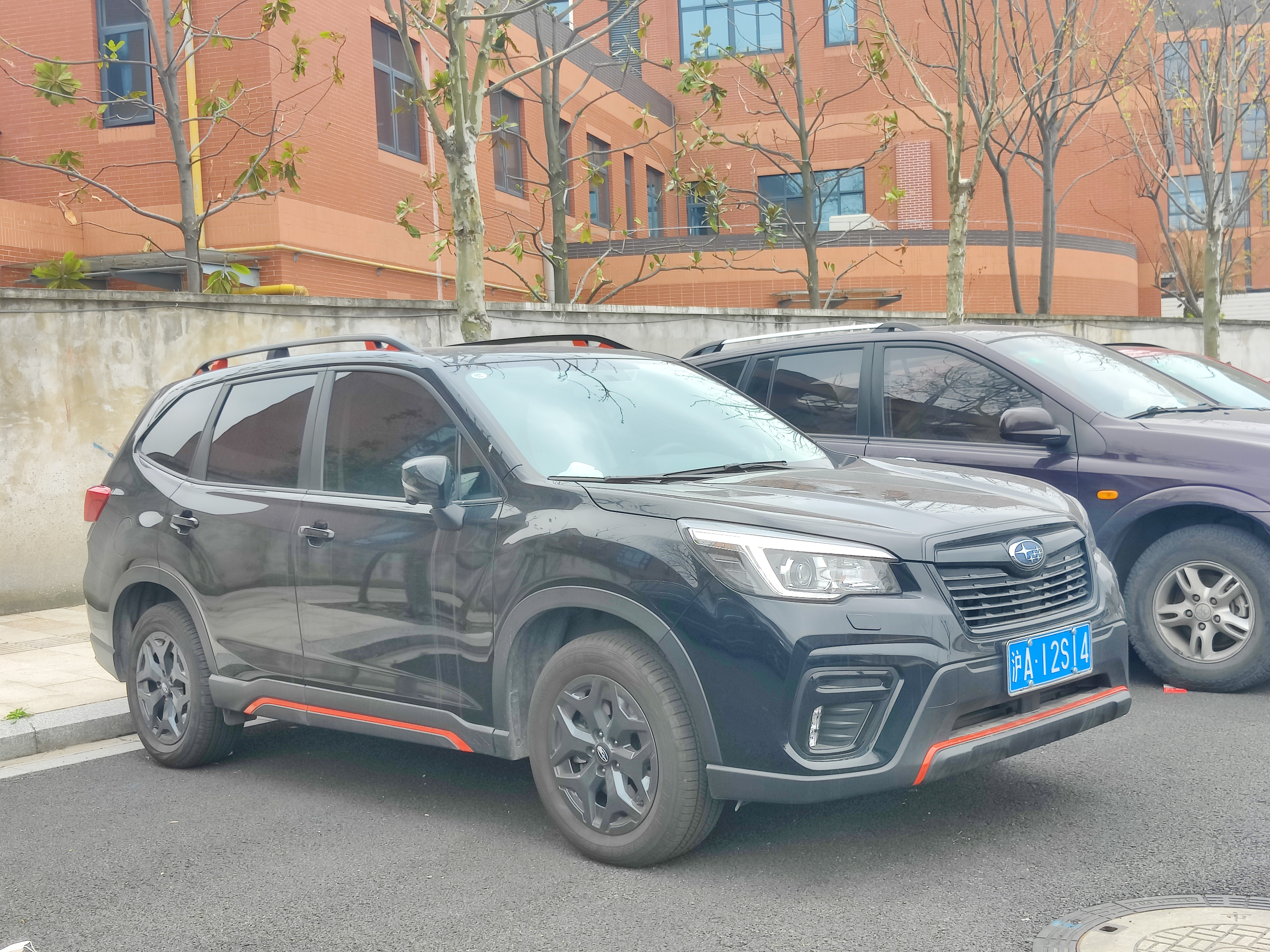
Forester Sport (pre-facelift)

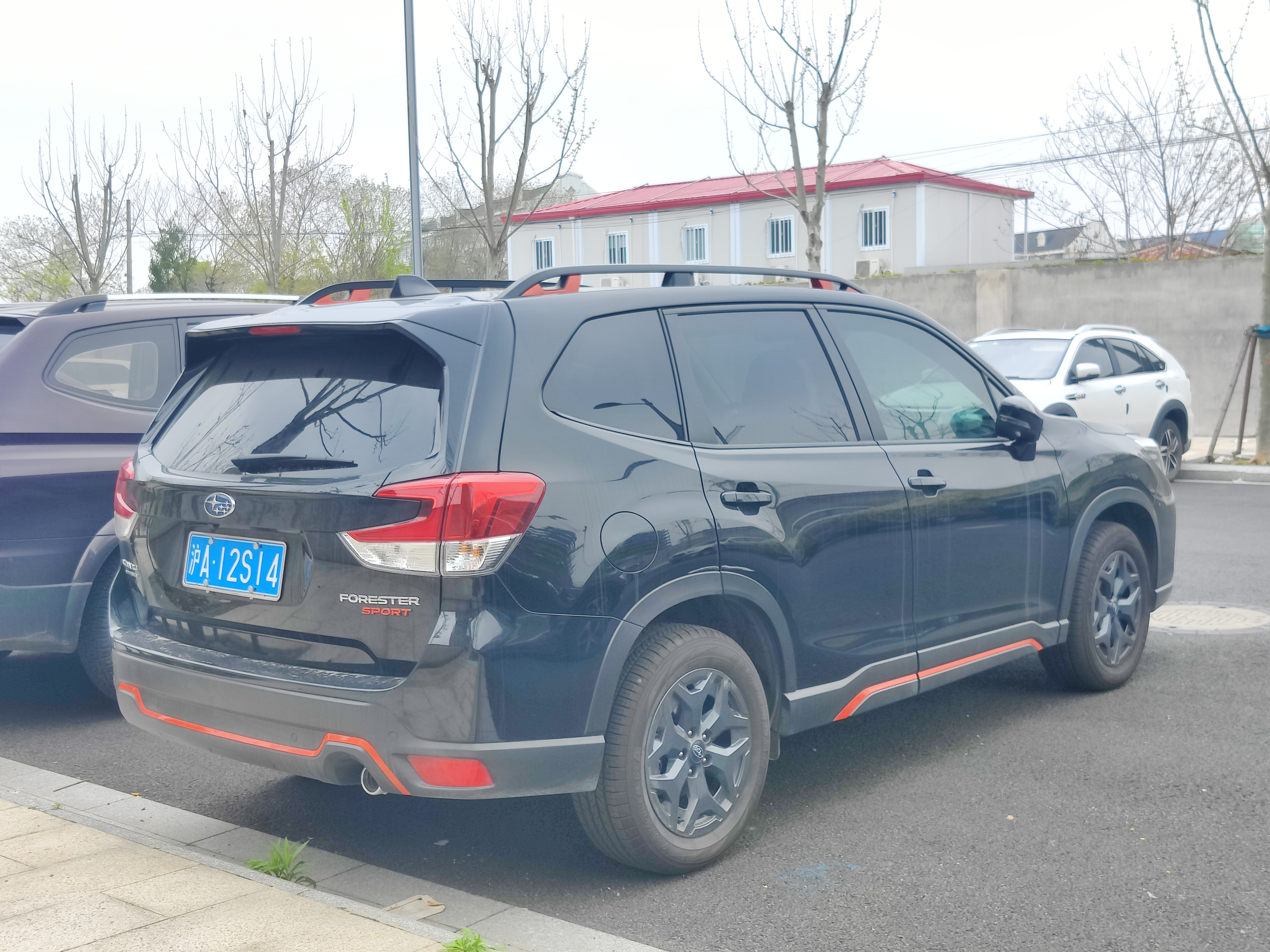
Forester Sport (pre-facelift)

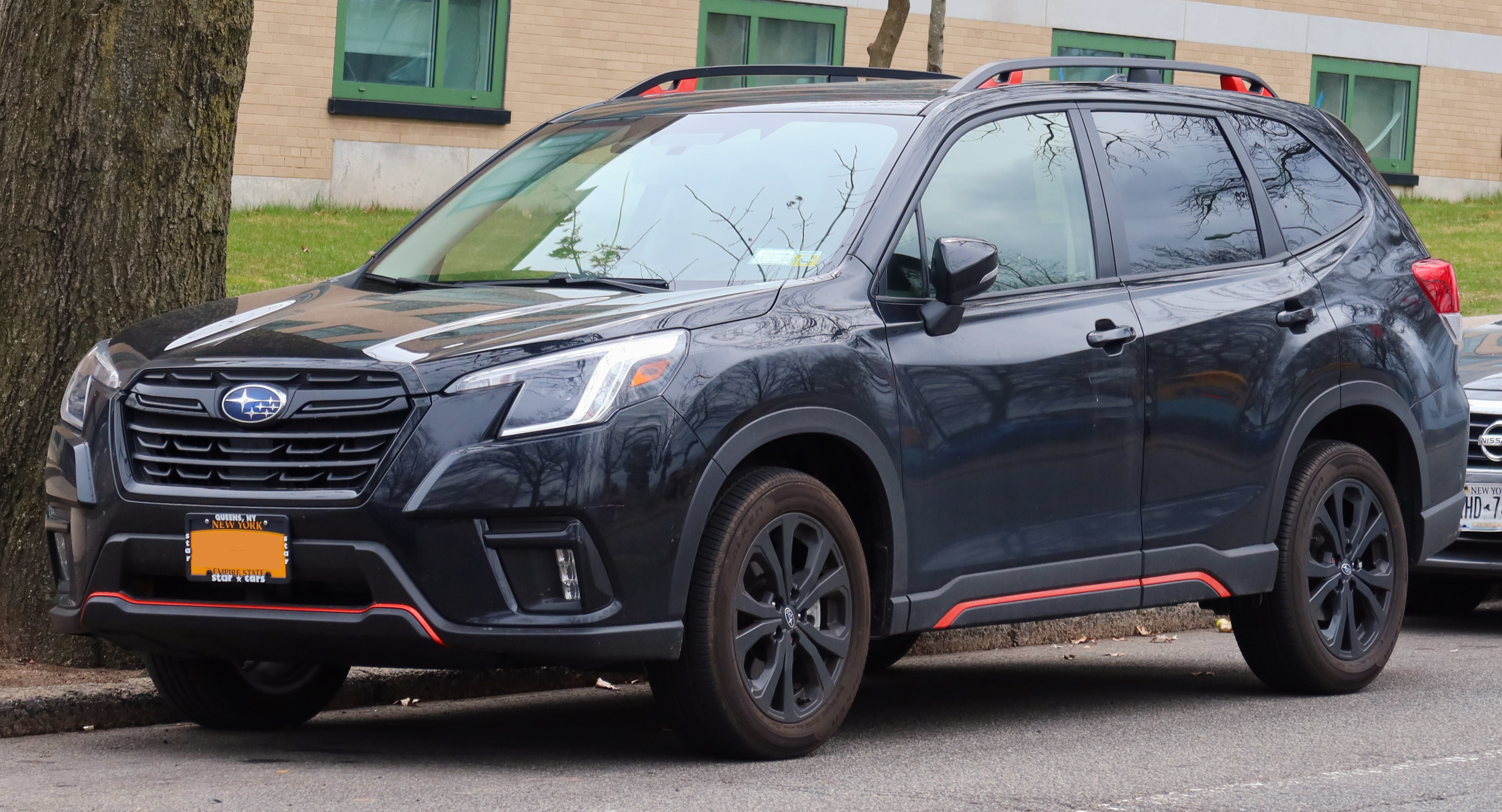
Forester Sport (facelift)

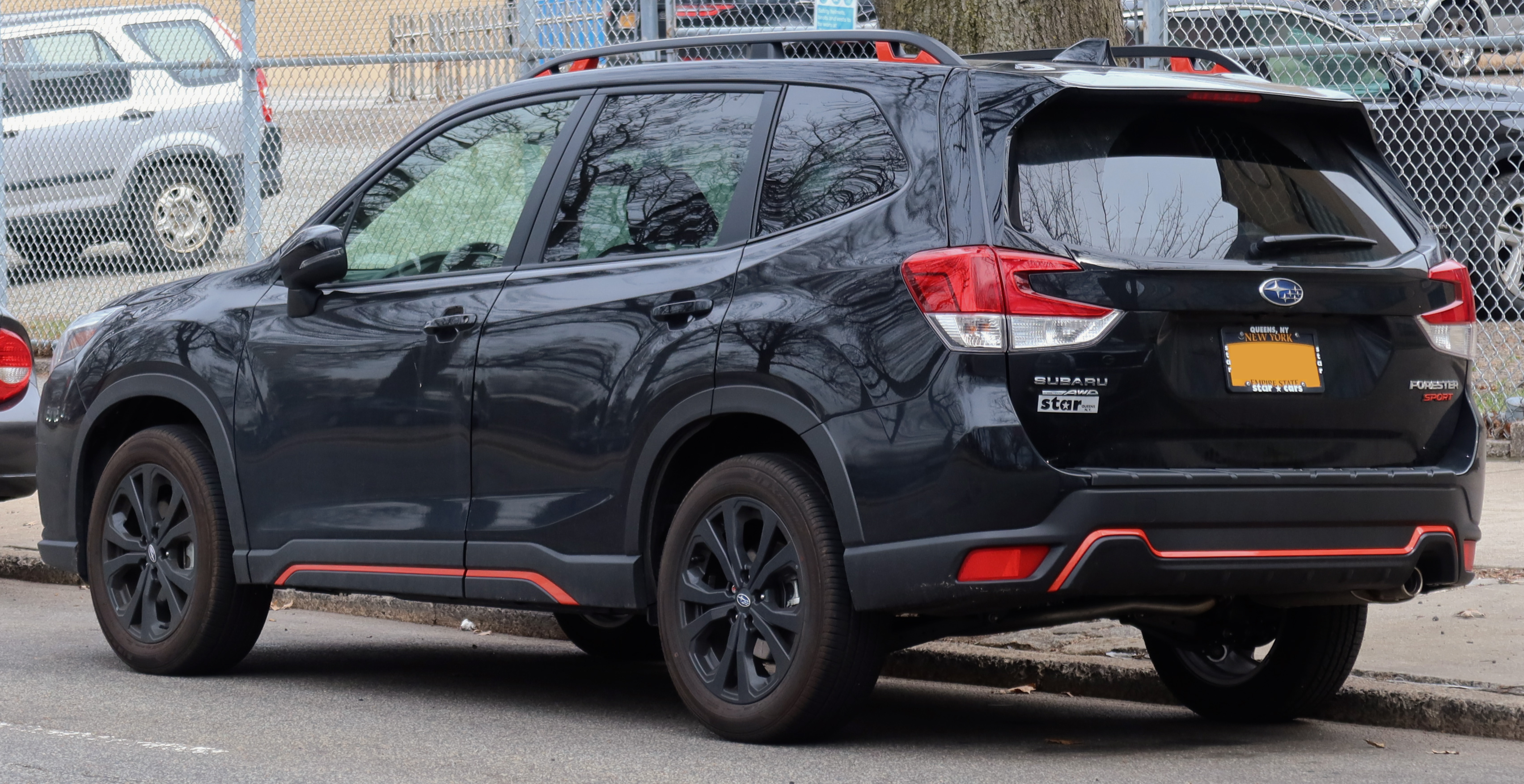
Forester Sport (facelift)

A Forester Sport with a CB18 1.8-liter direct injection turbocharged flat-4 engine was introduced in October 2020 for the Japanese domestic market. The engine produces 130 kW (177 PS; 174 hp) at 5,200-5,600 rpm and 300 N⋅m (221 lb⋅ft; 31 kg⋅m) at 1,600-3,600 rpm. This engine is also present in the JDM Subaru Levorg. With the introduction of the Sport, the FB20D e-BOXER became the standard engine across the rest of the Forester line in Japan. As of July 2021, there are no reports whether other markets will receive the CB18.

The Forester Sport is identified by its black grille as well as grey-painted fog lamps covers, side mirrors and rocker panels. The Sport also is equipped with a set of dark 18-inch wheels, while the rear fascia adds additional trim around the tailgate window. It is also equipped with dual exhaust outlets, which are part of a redesigned and sportier lower apron.

=== Facelift ===
The facelifted model was released for North America in September 2021 for the 2022 model year. It had a new front end as well as a slightly tweaked rear bumper while the powertrain was unchanged. All Forester models have Subaru's updated fourth-generation eyesight driver-assist system. An off-road-focused Wilderness model was also introduced.

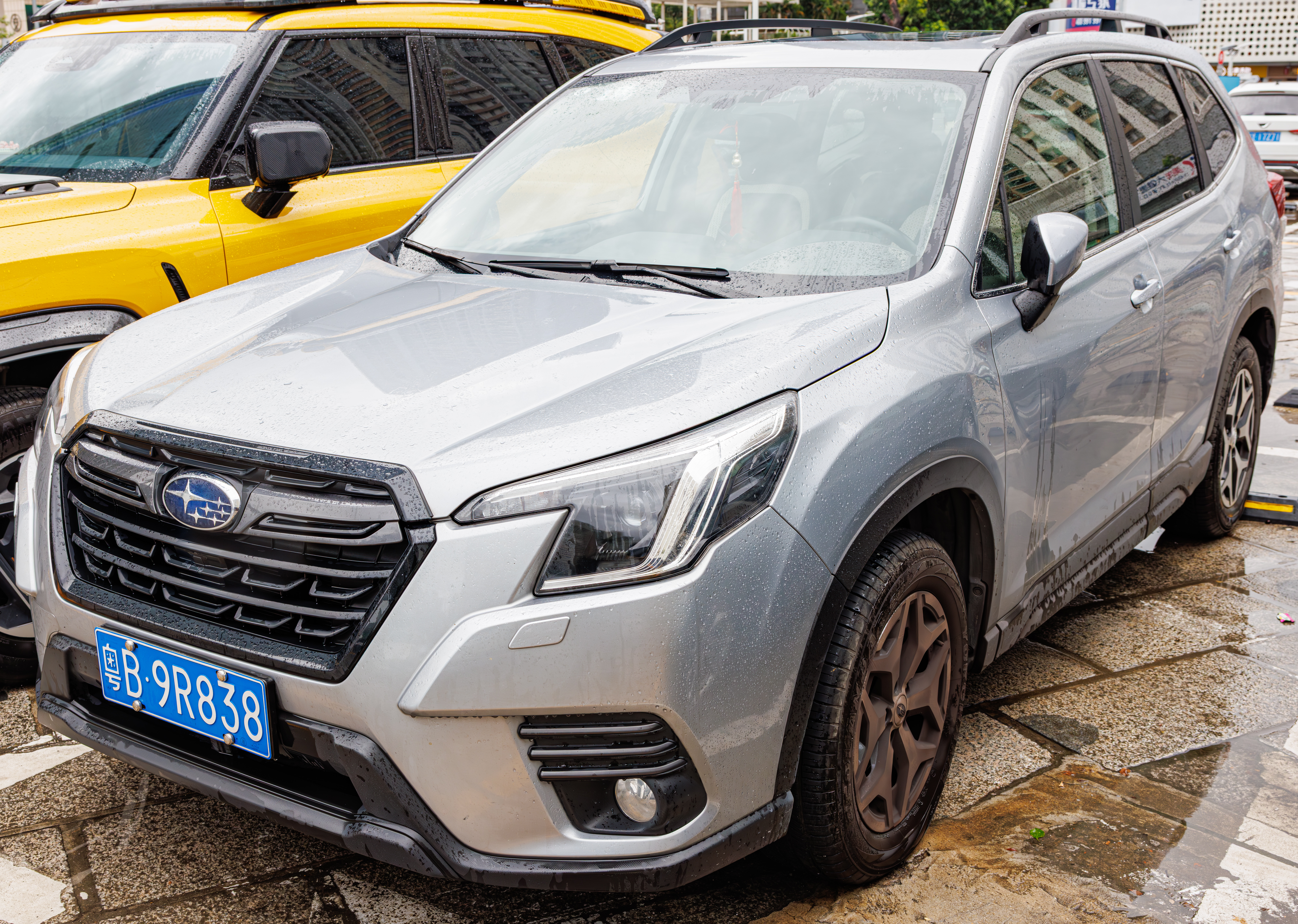
Facelift

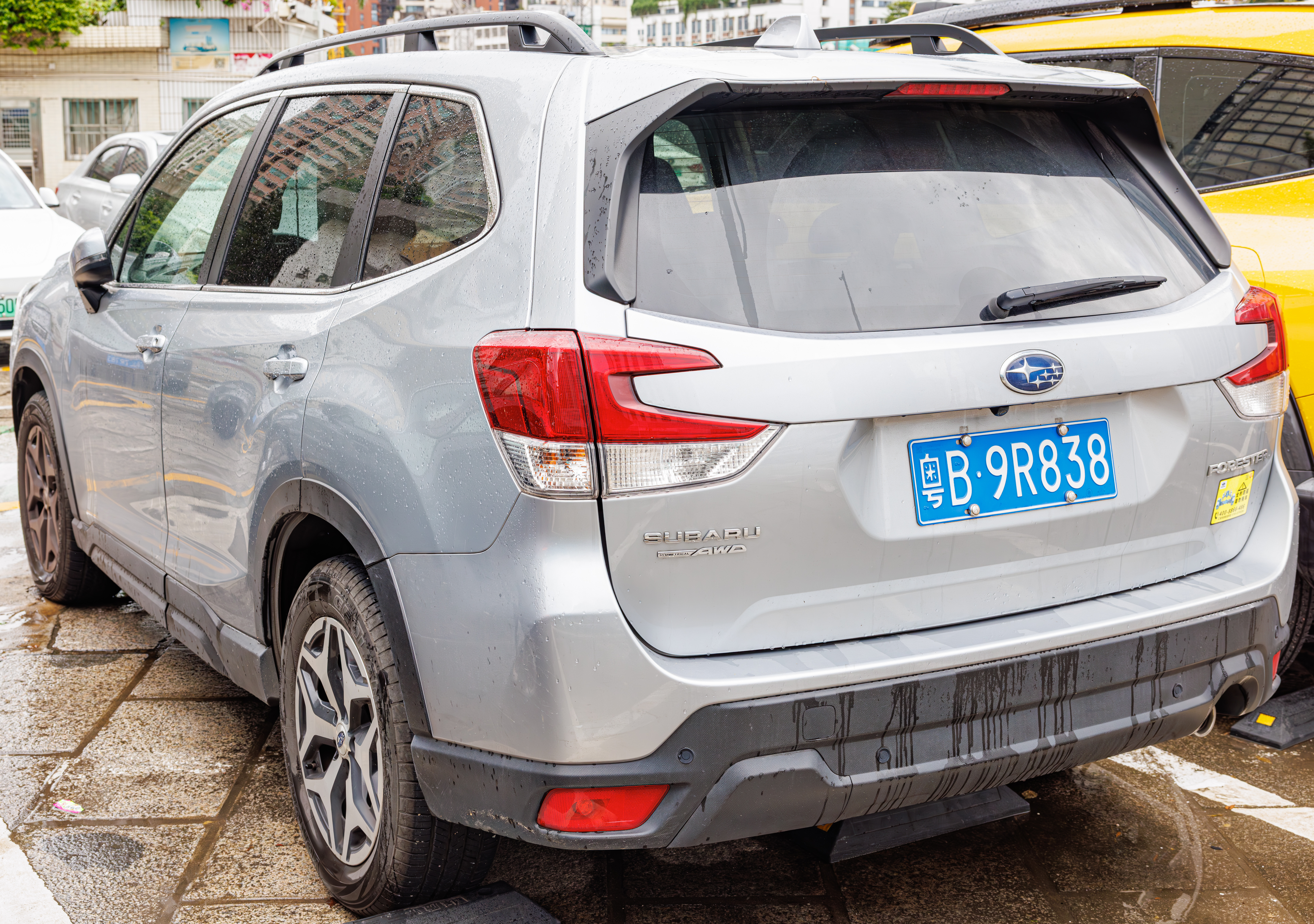
Rear view

==== Forester Wilderness ====
Alongside the facelift model, Subaru released a new model called the Forester Wilderness for the North American market. It is intended to be a more off-road-oriented version of the Forester, and is positioned between the Limited and Touring trim levels in the Forester lineup. Visually, the Forester has more body cladding, and on the inside, copper-colored accents. It features a 0.5 inches (13 mm) lift for a total of 9.2 inches (230 mm) of ground clearance, the Wilderness also has all-terrain tires, a higher final drive ratio (4.11 vs. 3.70), and a stronger roof rack than previous models. Subaru's StarTex water-repellent seats are also standard.

The Wilderness is powered by the same 2.5-liter FB25D naturally aspirated four cylinder engine powering other North American market Foresters. The Wilderness uses an Enhanced Dual-Function X-Mode version. The X-Mode is upgraded and re-tuned, with settings for snow, dirt, deep snow and mud. Additional wheel-slip is allowed to occur, which provides an advantage in harsh driving conditions.

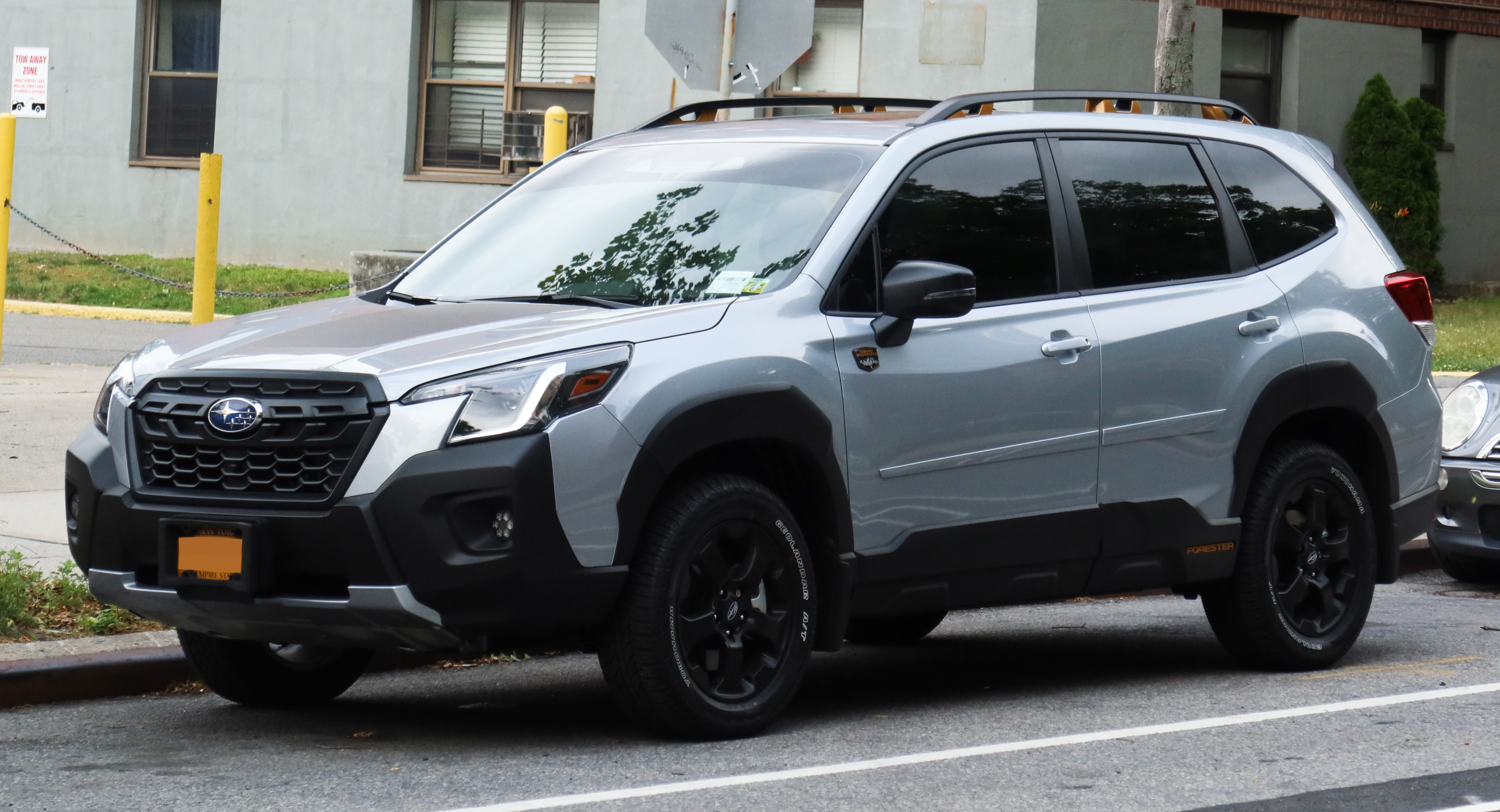
2022 Subaru Forester Wilderness

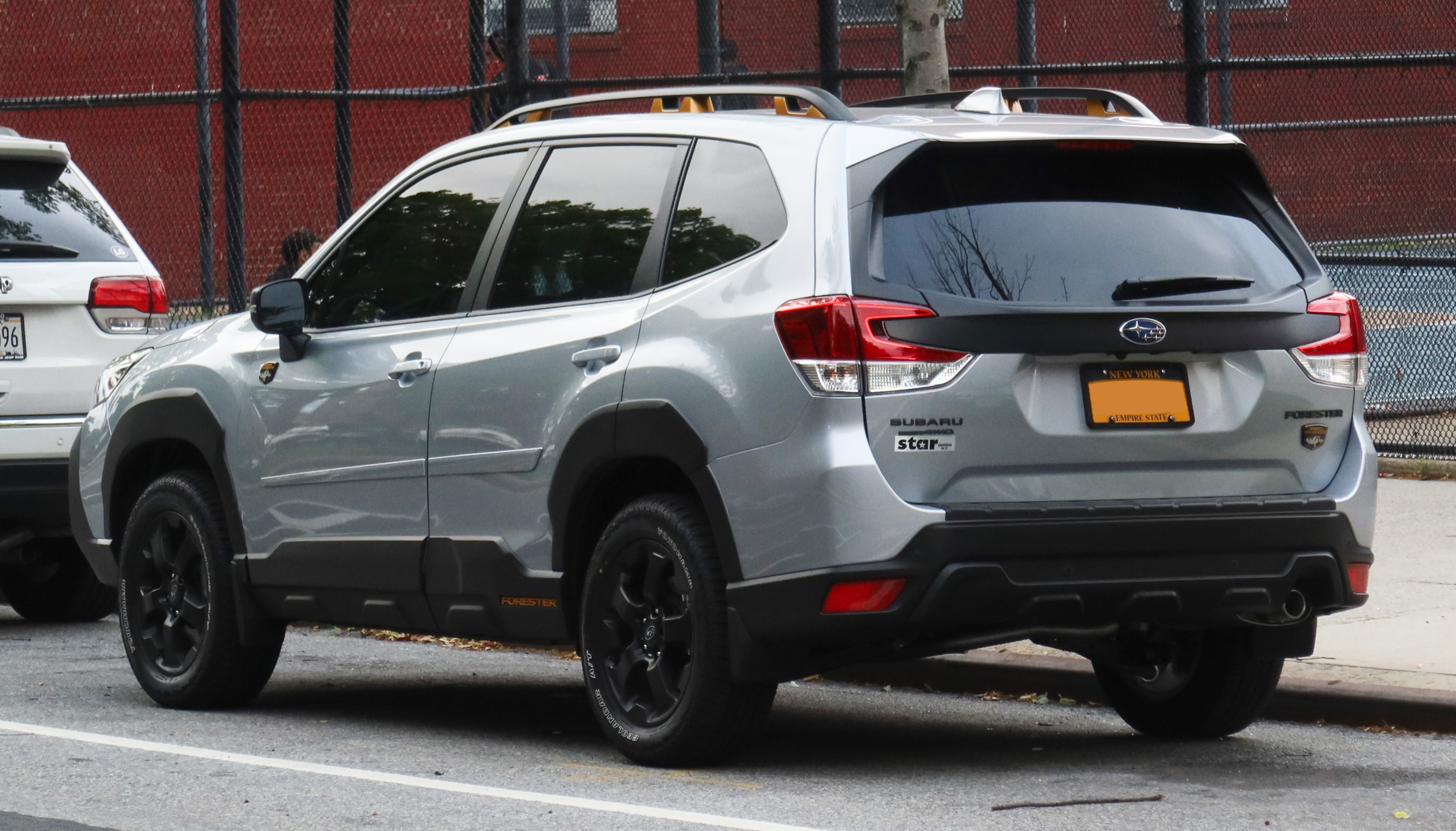
Rear view

==== Forester STI Sport ====
Subaru released a special model known as the Forester STI Sport in July 2023 for the Chinese market. The 2.0-liter FB20 H4 and 2.5-liter FB25 DI H4 engines are available paired to the Lineartronic CVT as standard. Three trim levels are available known as STI Sport, STI Sport Plus and STI Sport Plus Special Edition.

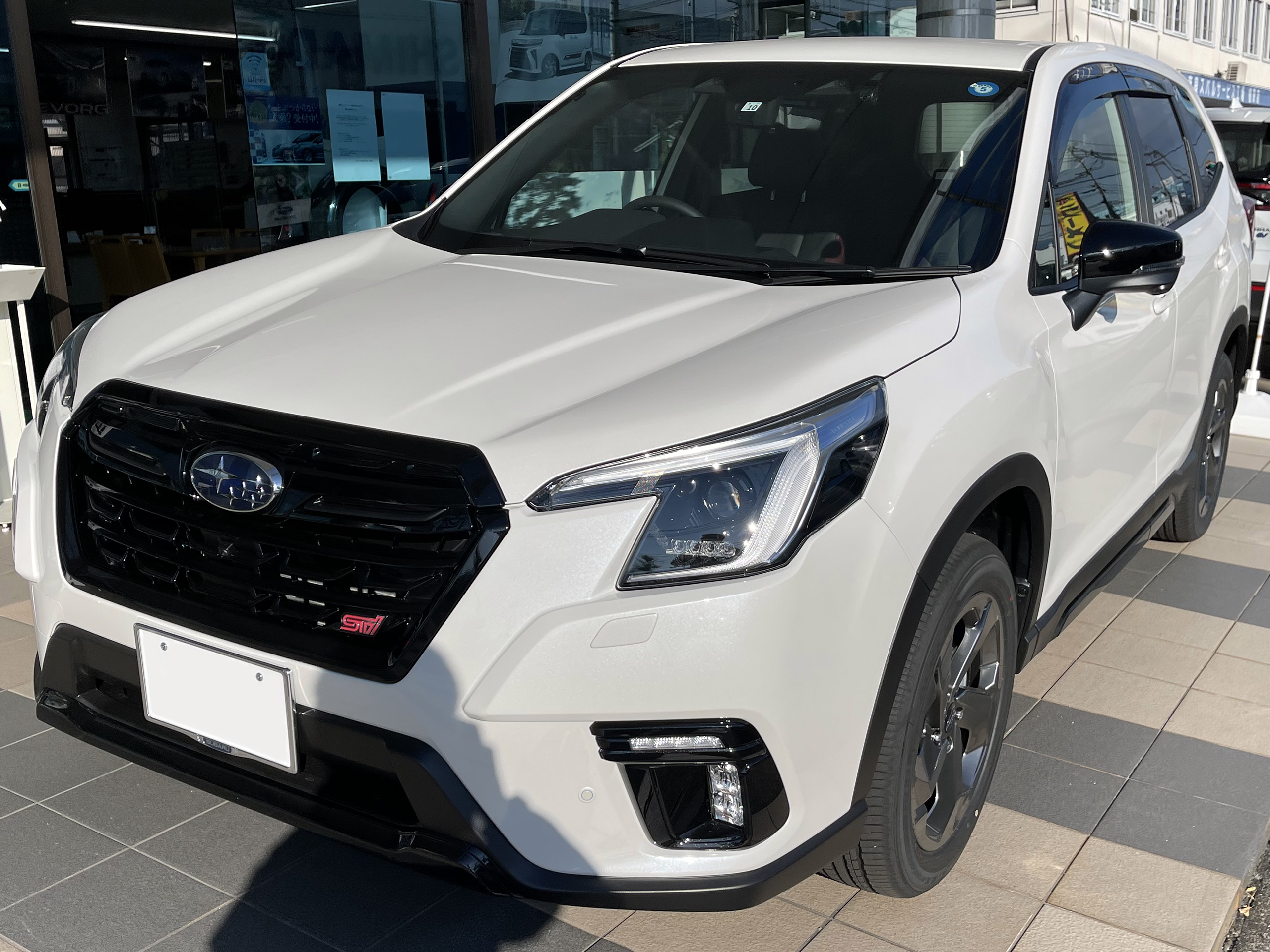
Front

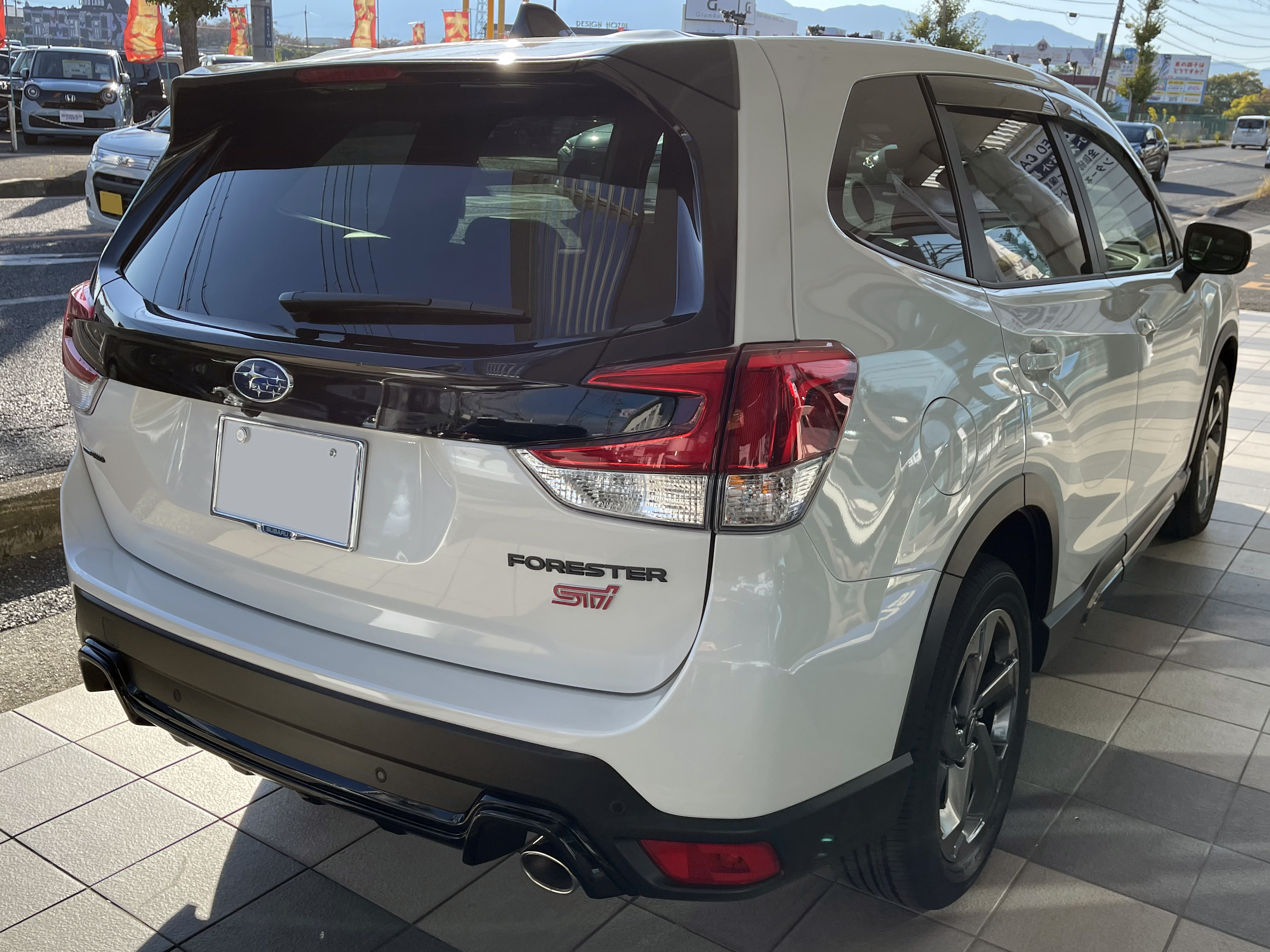
Rear

=== Safety ===
==== ANCAP ====
ANCAP test results* Subaru Forester (2019, aligned with Euro NCAP)
| Test | Points | % |
|---|---|---|
| Overall: | 5 /5 stars | |
| Adult occupant: | 36 | 94% |
| Child occupant: | 42.6 | 86% |
| Pedestrian: | 38.5 | 80% |
| Safety assist: | 10.1 | 78% |

==== Euro NCAP ====
Euro NCAP test results* Subaru Forester 2.0i-L EyeSight (LHD) (2019)
| Test | Points | % |
|---|---|---|
| Overall: | 5 /5 stars | |
| Adult occupant: | 37.1 | 97% |
| Child occupant: | 45 | 91% |
| Pedestrian: | 38.5 | 80% |
| Safety assist: | 10.2 | 78% |

==== IIHS ====
The 2019 model year Forester was awarded "Top Safety Pick+" by IIHS.

IIHS scores (2019 model year)
| Small overlap front (driver) | Good | |
| Small overlap front (passenger) | Good | |
| Moderate overlap front (original test) | Good | |
| Side (original test) | Good | |
| Side (updated test) | Acceptable | |
| Roof strength | Good | |
| Head restraints and seats | Good | |
| Headlights (varies by trim/option) | Good | Acceptable |
| Front crash prevention: vehicle-to-vehicle | Superior | |
| Front crash prevention: vehicle-to-pedestrian (Day) | Superior | |
| Child seat anchors (LATCH) ease of use | Good+ | |

== Sixth generation (SL; 2024) ==
Sixth generation
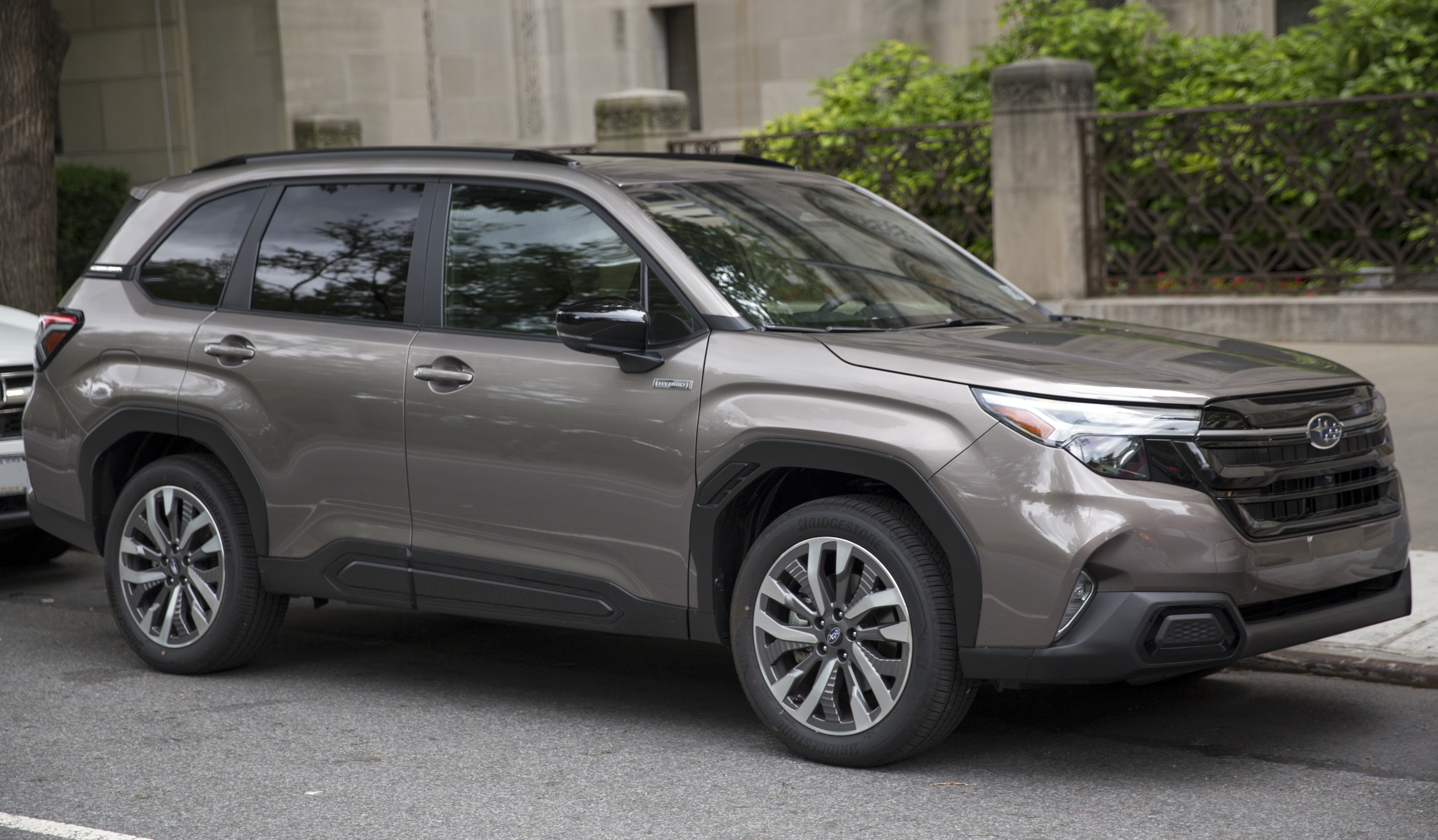
- 2025 Subaru Forester Hybrid Touring (North America)

Overview
- Model code: SL
- Production: 2024–present
- Model years: 2025–present
- Assembly: Japan: Ōta, Gunma; United States: Lafayette, Indiana (SIA; since October 2025)

Body and chassis
- Platform: Subaru Global Platform

Powertrain
- Engine: Gasoline: 1.8 L CB18 turbo H4; 2.5 L FB25 DI H4; Gasoline hybrid: 2.0 L FB20D e-Boxer H4 (MHEV); 2.5 L FB25D e-Boxer H4 (S:HEV/Hybrid)
- Electric motor: 12.3 kW (16 hp; 17 PS) (e-Boxer); 88 kW (118 hp; 120 PS) AC synchronous (S:HEV/Hybrid)
- Transmission: Lineartronic CVT; eCVT (S:HEV/Hybrid)
- Hybrid drivetrain: e-Boxer MHEV; Power-split (S:HEV/Hybrid)
- Battery: 13.5 kw/118.4V/4.8Ah lithium-ion (MHEV); 1.1 kWh (S:HEV/Hybrid)

Dimensions
- Wheelbase: 2,670 mm (105.1 in)
- Length: 4,655 mm (183.3 in)
- Width: 1,828 mm (72.0 in)
- Height: 1,730 mm (68.1 in)

The sixth-generation Forester was revealed at the Los Angeles Auto Show on November 16, 2023. The Forester is still based on the Subaru Global Platform with 10% greater rigidity. The exterior has design elements borrowed from other Subaru vehicles. The interior features a portrait 11.6-inch touchscreen standard on all trims except for the base model and a higher-mounted dashboard for increased space, and the 2.5-liter FB25 is carried over from the previous generation.

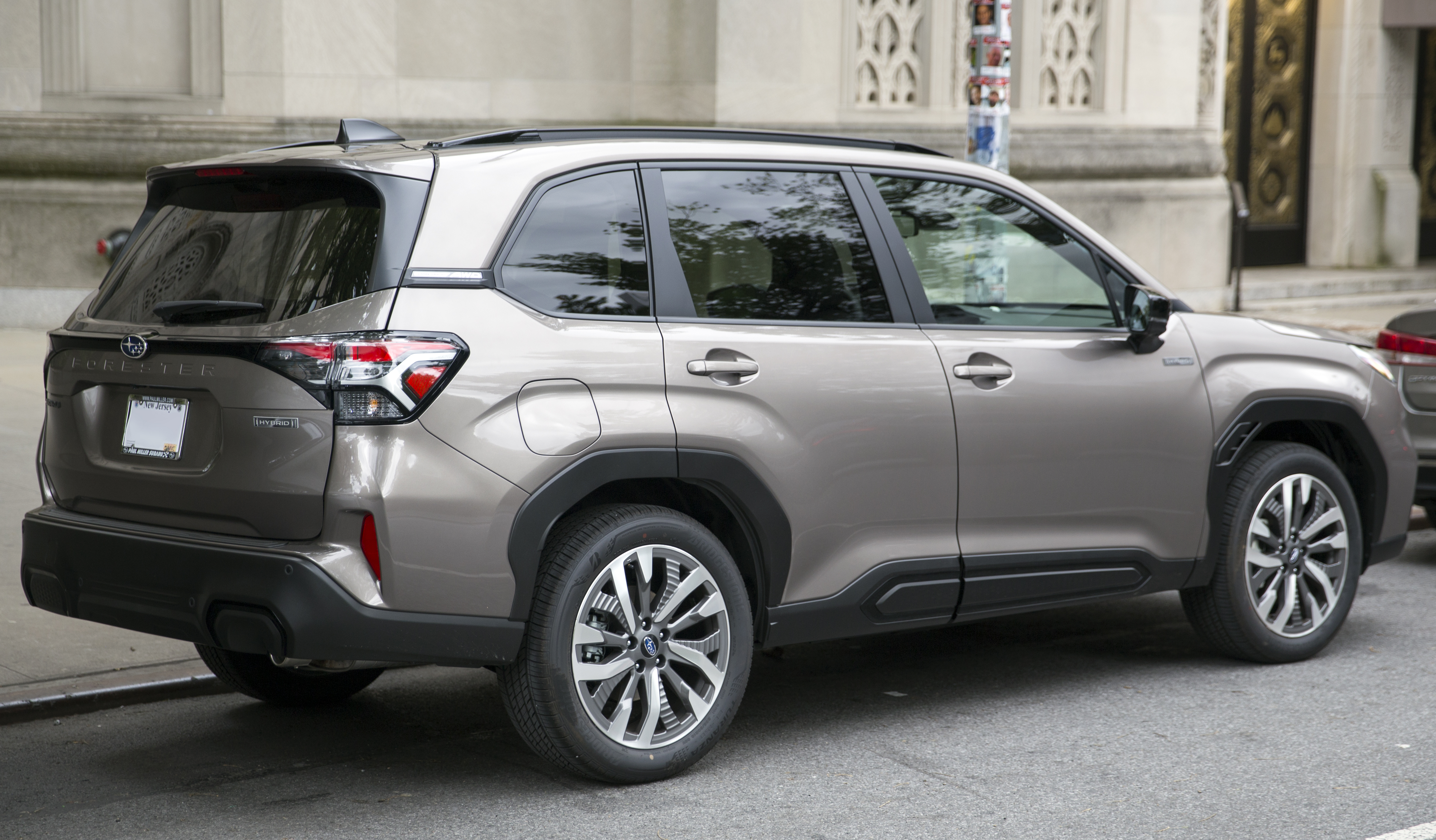
Rear view (North America)

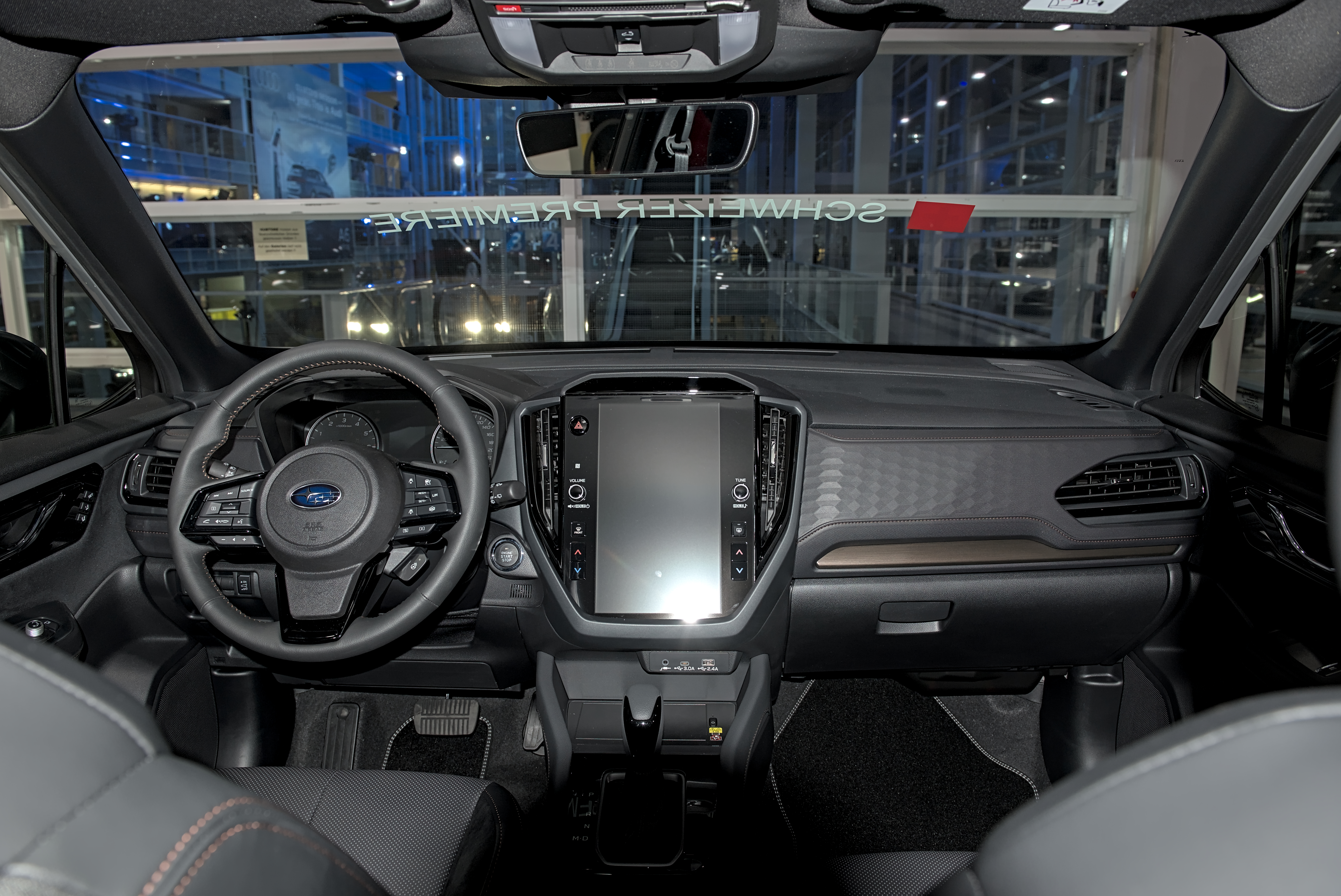
Interior

=== Forester Wilderness ===
The off-road focused Wilderness model was revealed on February 6, 2025 for the North American market and went on sale in late 2025 for the 2026 model year. Due to counter-tariffs imposed on U.S.-made products, the Wilderness model is not sold in Canada. Mechanical changes for the Wilderness model includes 9.3 in (240 mm) ground clearance, 17-inch Wilderness-exclusive alloy wheels equipped with Yokohama Geolander All-Terrains tires, improved approach, breakover, and departure angles, a revised Lineartronic CVT transmission with a shorter final drive ratio and paired with advanced X-MODE Dual Mode with Snow/Dirt and Deep Snow/Mud modes, revised Subaru Symmetrical All-Wheel Drive system, and an upgraded transmission cooler with a maximum towing capacity of 1,600 kg (3,500 lb) and a temperature sensor on the rear differential. The exterior of the Wilderness model includes anodized copper accents on the bumpers, body cladding trim pieces, hexagonal LED fog lights, standard roof rails with a static load capacity of 360 kg (800 lb), and underbody protection. Inside, the Wilderness model features a 12.3-inch digital instrument cluster with Wilderness-exclusive graphics, anodized copper accents for the interior, and StarTex synthetic leather upholstery.

A hybrid version was unveiled at the New York International Auto Show on April 1, 2026, and is scheduled to go on sale in late 2026 for the 2027 model year.

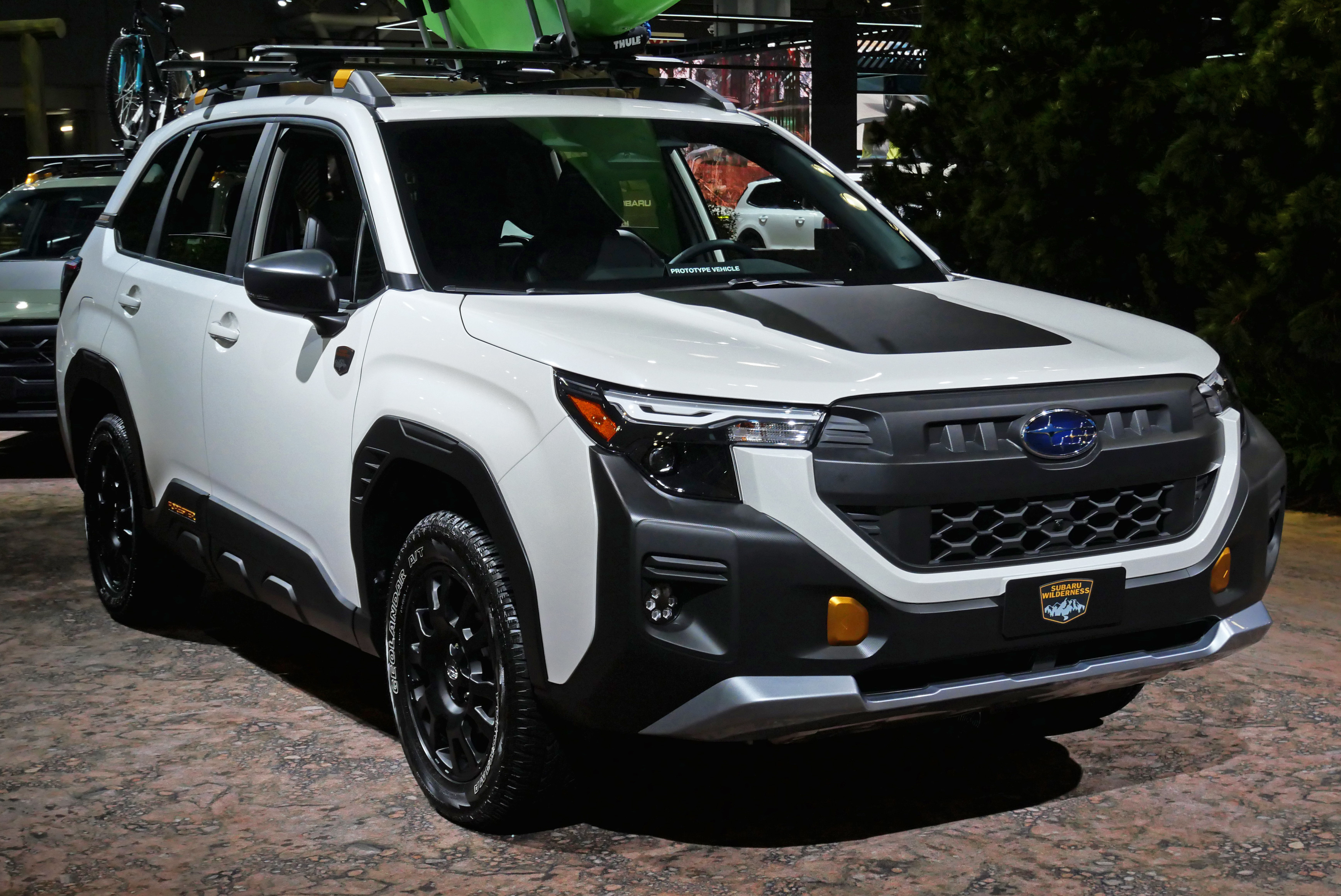
2026 Subaru Forester Wilderness

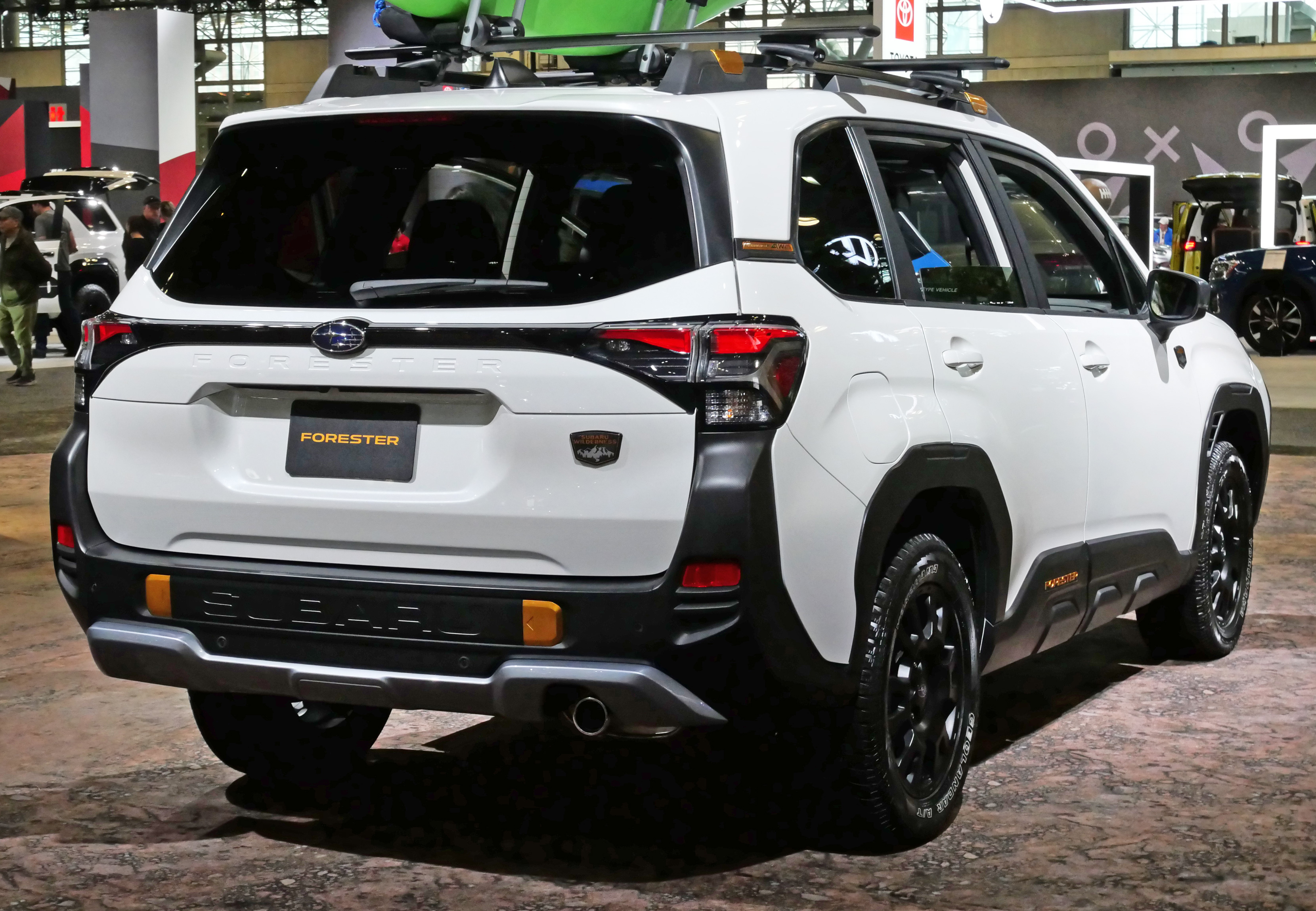
Rear view

=== Markets ===
==== Americas ====
===== Mexico =====
The sixth-generation Forester went on sale in Mexico on July 3, 2025, with three variants: Sport, Touring and e-Boxer Hybrid. For powertrains, the Sport and Touring variants use the 2.5-liter FB25 gasoline while the e-Boxer Hybrid variant use the 2.5-liter FB25D gasoline hybrid.

===== United States and Canada =====
The sixth-generation Forester was released in North America in the second quarter of 2024 for the 2025 model year, in Base, Premium, Sport, Limited and Touring trim levels. In Canada, the same five trims are known as Convenience, Touring, Sport, Limited and Premier, respectively. For the North American market, it is powered by the 2.5-liter FB25 gasoline powertrain.

The Forester Hybrid went on sale in February 2025 for the 2025 model year, powered by the 2.5-liter FB25D gasoline hybrid, it is available in Premium, Sport, Limited and Touring trims.

Beginning with the 2026 model year, the Forester models for the U.S. market are produced in the United States at Subaru of Indiana Automotive, Inc. in Lafayette, Indiana.

==== Asia ====
===== Indonesia =====
The sixth-generation Forester was launched in Indonesia on July 23, 2025 at the 32nd Gaikindo Indonesia International Auto Show, as the first ASEAN country to market the sixth-generation Forester. It is available in the sole variant powered by the 2.5-liter FB25 gasoline.

===== Japan =====
The sixth-generation Forester was released in Japan on April 17, 2025, with three variants: Sport, X-Break S:HEV and Premium S:HEV. All three variants have the option of the Subaru EyeSight (EX) system. For powertrains, the Forester is available with 1.8-liter CB18 turbocharged gasoline and 2.5-liter FB25D gasoline hybrid (S:HEV) powertrains. In the Japanese market, the Forester is available with an external airbag designed specifically for cyclists, a world's first feature in the automotive industry, that deploys the airbag near the top of the hood.

===== Malaysia =====
The sixth-generation Forester was launched in Malaysia on October 30, 2025. Fully imported from Japan, it is available in the sole variant: 2.5i-S EyeSight powered by the 2.5-liter FB25 gasoline.

===== Philippines =====
The sixth-generation Forester was launched in the Philippines on September 27, 2025. It is available in a sole variant: e-Boxer Hybrid powered by a 2.5-liter FB25D gasoline hybrid.

===== Taiwan =====
The sixth-generation Forester was launched in Taiwan on July 18, 2025, with three variants: i-L EyeSight, i-S EyeSight and SHEV i-S EyeSight. For powertrains, it is available with either 2.5-liter FB25 gasoline and 2.5-liter FB25D gasoline hybrid powertrains.

===== Thailand =====
The sixth-generation Forester was launched in Thailand on October 3, 2025. Fully imported from Japan, it is available in the sole variant: 2.5 i-S EyeSight powered by the 2.5-liter FB25 gasoline. The S:HEV was added on November 10, 2026. It is available in sole variant, powered by the 2.5-litre FB25D e-Boxer strong hybrid gasoline.

===== Vietnam =====
The sixth-generation Forester was launched in Vietnam on November 12, 2025. Fully imported from Japan, it is available with two variants: 2.5iL EyeSight and 2.5iS EyeSight, both variants are powered by the 2.5-liter FB25 gasoline.

==== Europe ====
The sixth-generation Forester was released in the European market in October 2024, it is powered by the 2.0-liter FB20D e-Boxer gasoline mild hybrid powertrain.

==== Oceania ====
===== Australia =====
The sixth-generation Forester was launched in Australia on May 28, 2025, with four variants: Standard, Premium, Sport and Touring. For powertrains, it is available with either 2.5-liter FB25 gasoline and 2.5-liter FB25D gasoline hybrid powertrains.

===== New Zealand =====
The sixth-generation Forester went on sale in New Zealand on June 5, 2025 with customer deliveries commenced in July 2025. It is available with three trim levels: Standard, Sport and Touring. For powertrains, all three trims were available with either 2.5-liter FB25 gasoline and 2.5-liter FB25D gasoline hybrid powertrains.

==== South Africa ====
The sixth-generation Forester was launched in South Africa on August 28, 2025, with four trim levels: Field, Touring, Sport and Premium, it is powered by the 2.5-liter FB25 gasoline.

=== Safety ===
==== ANCAP ====
ANCAP test results Subaru Forester (2024, aligned with Euro NCAP)
| Test | Points | % |
|---|---|---|
| Overall: | 5 /5 stars | |
| Adult occupant: | 33.52 | 83% |
| Child occupant: | 44.72 | 91% |
| Pedestrian: | 54.68 | 86% |
| Safety assist: | 13.65 | 75% |

==== Euro NCAP ====
Euro NCAP test results Subaru Forester 2.0i-L (LHD) (2024)
| Test | Points | % |
|---|---|---|
| Overall: | 5 /5 stars | |
| Adult occupant: | 33.5 | 83% |
| Child occupant: | 43.9 | 89% |
| Pedestrian: | 54.7 | 86% |
| Safety assist: | 13.1 | 72% |

==== IIHS ====
The 2025 model year Forester was awarded "Top Safety Pick" by IIHS.

IIHS scores (2025 model year)
| Small overlap front | Good |
| Moderate overlap front (updated test) | Acceptable |
| Side (updated test) | Good |
| Headlights | Good |
| Front crash prevention: vehicle-to-vehicle 2.0 | Good |
| Front crash prevention: vehicle-to-pedestrian | Good |
| Seatbelt reminders | Good |
| Child seat anchors (LATCH) ease of use | Good+ |

== Awards ==
- Car and Driver's 5Best Trucks 2004, 2005, 2006
- Winner of Wheels Gold star cars award for best compact SUV 2008
- Winner of Motor Trend magazine's Sport/Utility of the Year Award in 2009
- Best Small Utility in MotorWeek's 2009 Driver's Choice Awards
- Winner of Motor Trend Magazine's SUV of the Year Award in 2014
- Insurance Institute for Highway Safety Top Safety Pick+
- Subaru Forester Claims Top Honours as AJAC's 2017 Canadian Utility Vehicle of the Year
- Winner of New Zealand Motoring Writers Guild Car of the Year Award in 2018

== Sales ==
| Year | U.S. | Canada | Japan | Australia | Thailand |
|---|---|---|---|---|---|
| 1997 | | | | 2,139 | |
| 1998 | | | | 6,515 | |
| 1999 | | | | 7,390 | |
| 2000 | | | | 8,049 | |
| 2001 | | | 22,308 | 8,416 | |
| 2002 | | | 27,004 | 9,863 | |
| 2003 | | | 21,599 | 11,780 | |
| 2004 | 6,568 | 4,204 | 19,466 | 11,852 | |
| 2005 | 53,541 | 3,614 | 20,099 | 12,320 | |
| 2006 | 51,258 | 3,737 | 14,895 | 13,010 | |
| 2007 | 44,530 | 3,303 | 12,550 | 12,554 | |
| 2008 | 60,748 | 6,322 | 23,143 | 14,423 | |
| 2009 | 77,781 | 8,638 | 12,939 | 13,753 | |
| 2010 | 85,080 | 8,941 | 14,098 | 14,644 | |
| 2011 | 76,196 | 8,673 | 14,515 | 13,142 | |
| 2012 | 80,356 | 7,156 | 12,472 | 11,533 | |
| 2013 | 123,592 | 11,239 | 35,166 | 13,649 | |
| 2014 | 159,953 | 12,302 | 25,921 | 13,670 | 105 |
| 2015 | 175,192 | 12,706 | 20,520 | | 129 |
| 2016 | 178,593 | 13,798 | 28,544 | | 1,468 |
| 2017 | 177,563 | 13,441 | 19,937 | 12,474 | 939 |
| 2018 | 171,613 | 14,248 | 28,751 | 12,432 | 749 |
| 2019 | 180,179 | 13,059 | 32,384 | 15,096 | 2,366 |
| 2020 | 176,996 | 13,134 | 24,056 | 12,300 | 1,192 |
| 2021 | 154,723 | 9,823 | 22,903 | 11,810 | 1,507 |
| 2022 | 114,096 | 4,067 | 25,096 | 10,637 | 1,870 |
| 2023 | 152,566 | | 22,141 | 16,381 | 1,317 |
| 2024 | 175,521 | 16,376 | 22,977 | 13,445 | 528 |
| 2025 | 175,070 | | | | |
