= Nissan Rasheen =

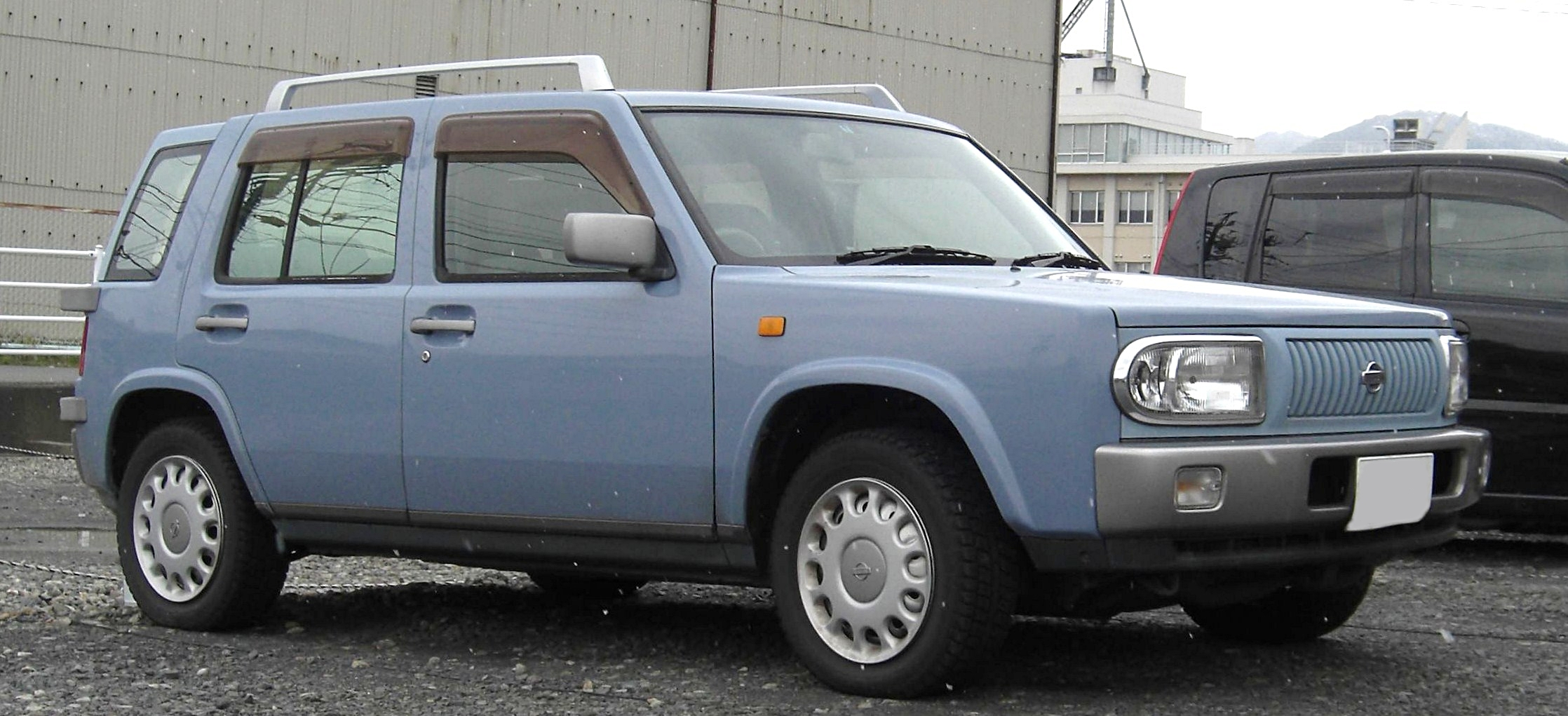
- 1997–2000 Nissan Rasheen

Overview
- Manufacturer: Nissan; Takada Kogyo, Yokohama
- Model code: RB14
- Production: 1994–2000
- Assembly: Japan: Yokosuka, Kanagawa (Oppama Plant)
- Designer: Naoki Sakai

Body and chassis
- Class: Compact crossover SUV
- Body style: 5-door SUV
- Layout: Front-engine, four-wheel-drive
- Related: Nissan Sunny (B14)

Powertrain
- Engine: 1.5 L GA15DE I4 (RFNB14); 1.8 L SR18DE I4 (RHNB14); 2.0 L SR20DE I4 (RKNB14)
- Transmission: 4-speed automatic 5 speed manual

Dimensions
- Wheelbase: 2,430 mm (95.7 in)
- Length: 3,980–4,210 mm (156.7–165.7 in)
- Width: 1,720 mm (67.7 in)
- Height: 1,515 mm (59.6 in)
- Curb weight: 1,310 kg (2,888 lb)

Chronology
- Successor: Nissan X-Trail

The Nissan Rasheen (Japanese: 日産・ラシーン, Hepburn: Nissan Rashīn) is a compact crossover SUV with four-wheel drive capabilities produced from November 1994 to August 2000 by Nissan. It is a five-seater with a rugged, quirky and angularly styled five-door body.

It was the fifth series and the last of Nissan's "Pike" car designs (Be-1, Pao, Figaro, and S-Cargo). As for the Be-1 and Figaro, production of the Rasheen was carried out by contract manufacturer Takada Kogyo. It was exclusive to Nissan Japanese dealership network called Nissan Red Stage. By August 2000, production had come to a halt, amidst the restructuring following Carlos Ghosn's "Nissan Revival Plan", with a total production of 72,793 units.

== Overview ==
A prototype was first shown at the October 1993 Tokyo Motor Show in the same name. The car's design was often compared with Eastern European cars in design, particularly the Wartburg 353.

The Rasheen shares several parts from the B14 Sunny. It was uses many parts common to the four-wheel drive drivetrain and powertrain components from the Nissan Pulsar (N14). All models are four-wheel drive and employ a fully automatic full-time 4WD system using a viscous coupling. It was adopting the derivative chassis code RB14. All models also carried an "N" (indicating four-wheel drive) and another letter to signify which engine was fitted, with "RFNB14" being the 1.5-litre model. The second letter of the model designation varies depending on the model, with "F" assigned to the regular Rasheen, "K" to the Rasheen Forza, and "H" to Rasheen ft (Farther Transport) model.

The model was offered with three different inline-four petrol engines. Originally, it was only available with a 105 PS (77 kW) 1.5-liter GA15DE petrol engine, the 125 PS (92 kW) 1.8-liter SR18DE engine was added to the lineup in January 1997, only available with the automatic transmission.

A facelift occurred in January 1997, it featured a redesigned front grille, and clear turn signal lenses on the front bumper. Dual airbags and ABS were made standard on all models. After having been shown at the 1997 Tokyo Motor Show, the Rasheen Forza was added in April 1998, featuring a 2.0-liter SR20DE 145 PS (107 kW) engine.

The Rasheen had full-time four wheel drive, Nissan's ATTESA powertrain system. This is a viscous coupling that determines where to send torque based on traction situations. Anti-lock brakes were introduced September 1996 along with various trim packages introduced during the production period.

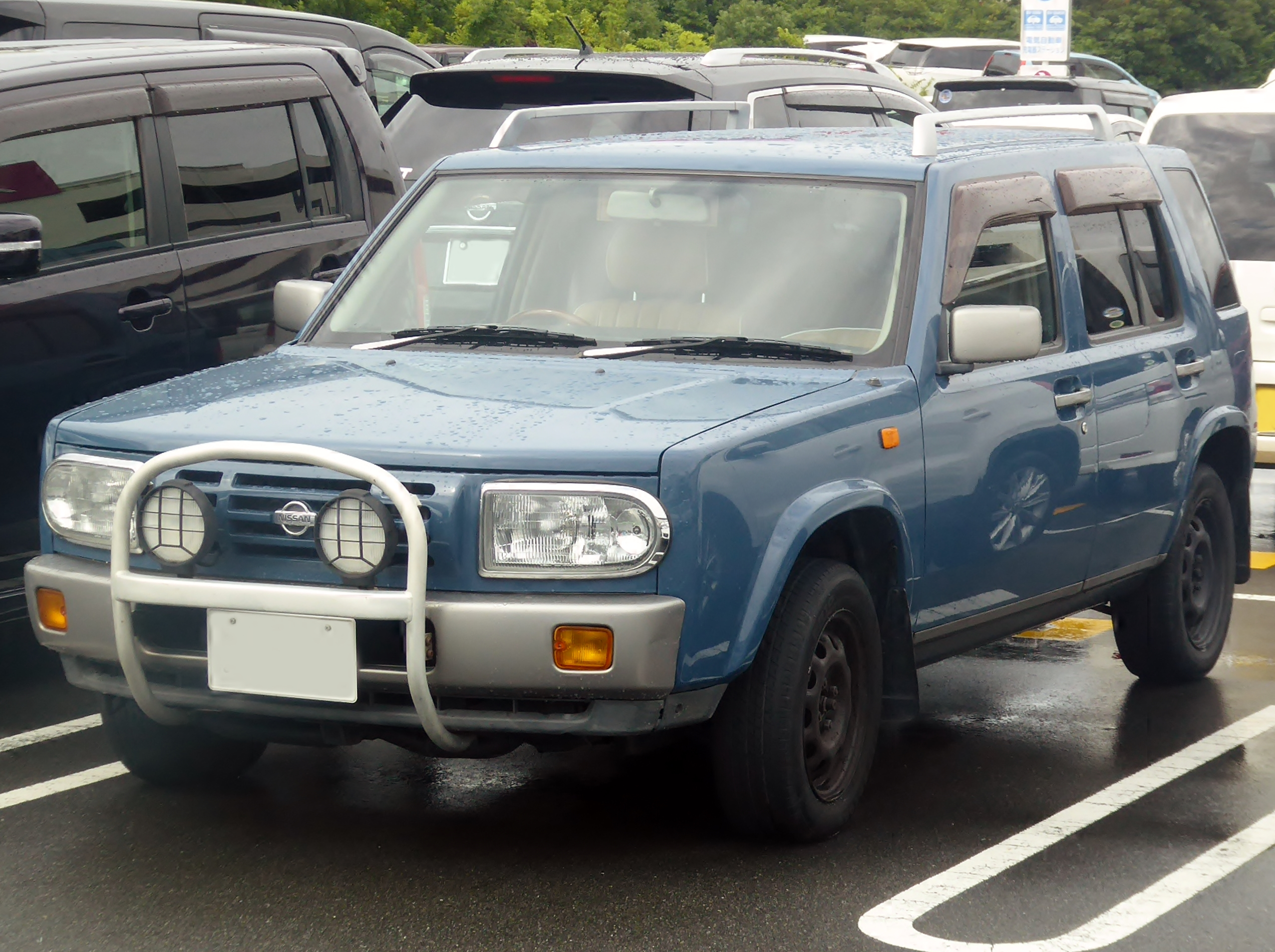
1994–1997 Nissan Rasheen

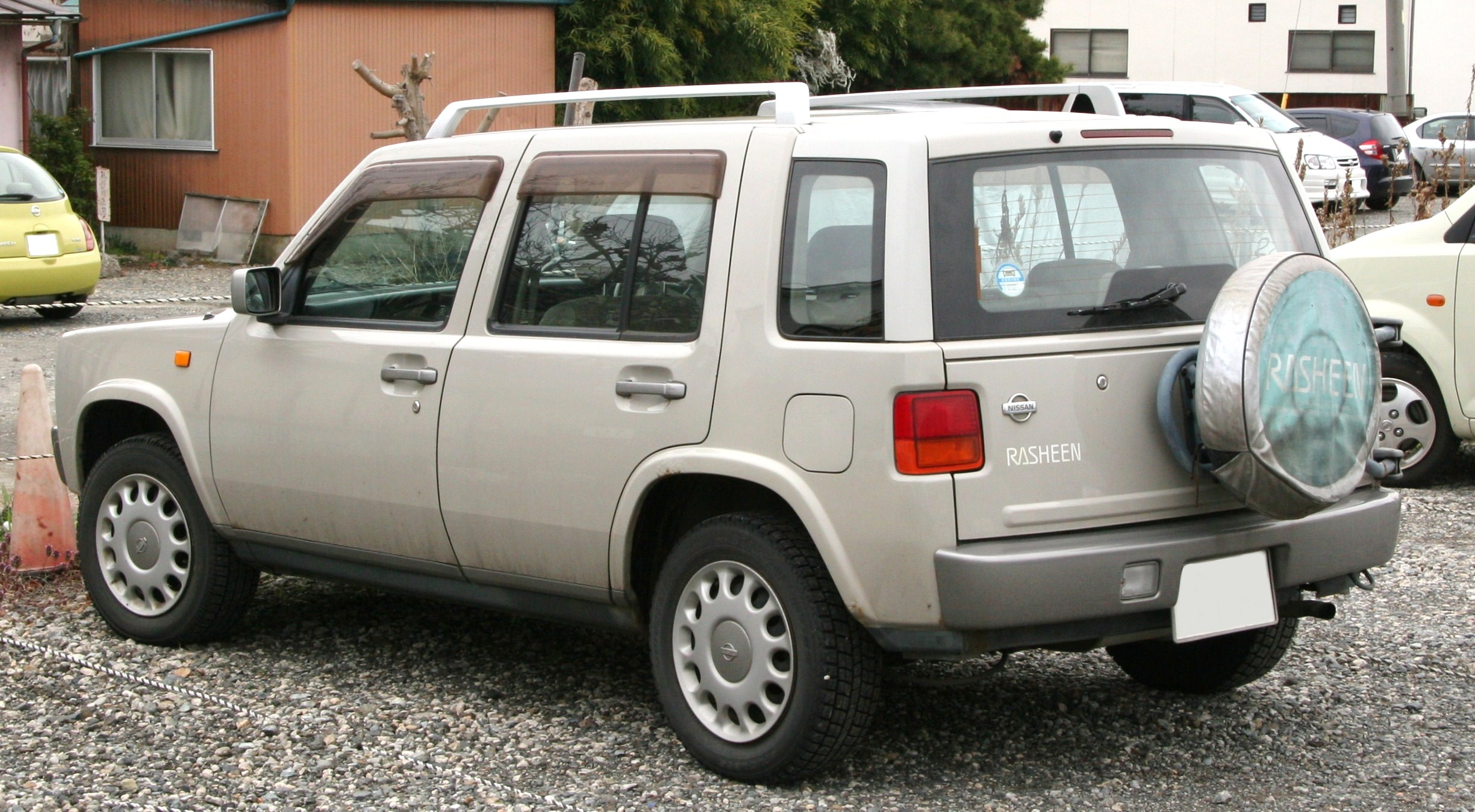
Nissan Rasheen, rear view

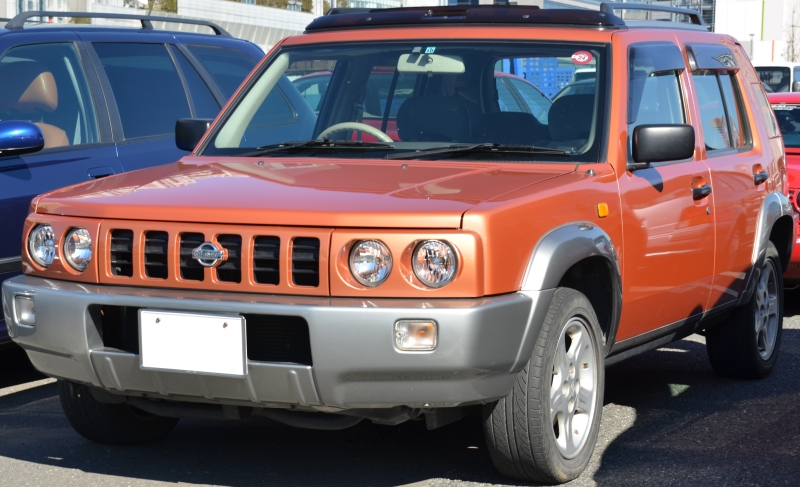
Nissan Rasheen Forza

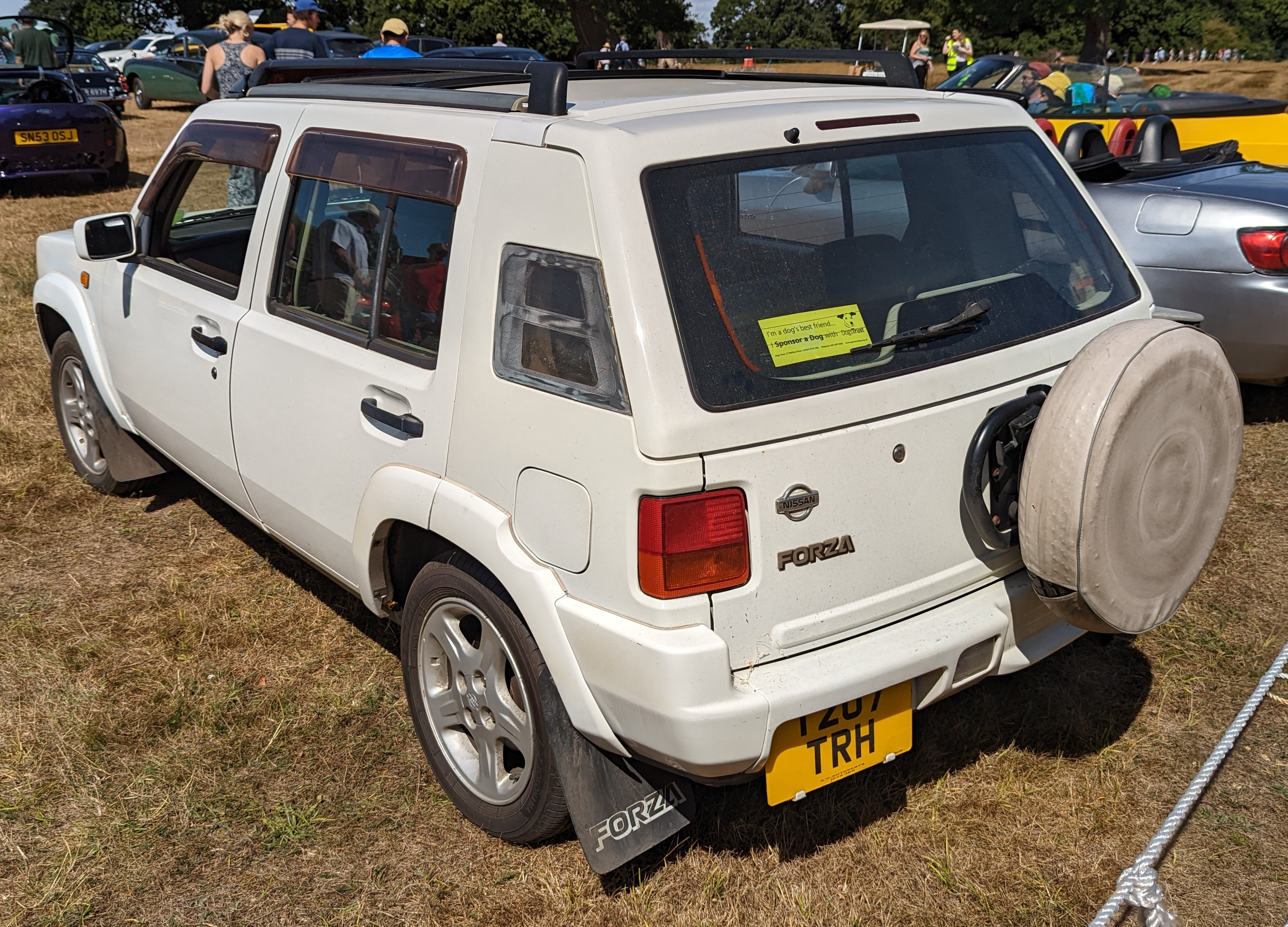
Nissan Rasheen Forza, rear view
