= Nissan Pao =

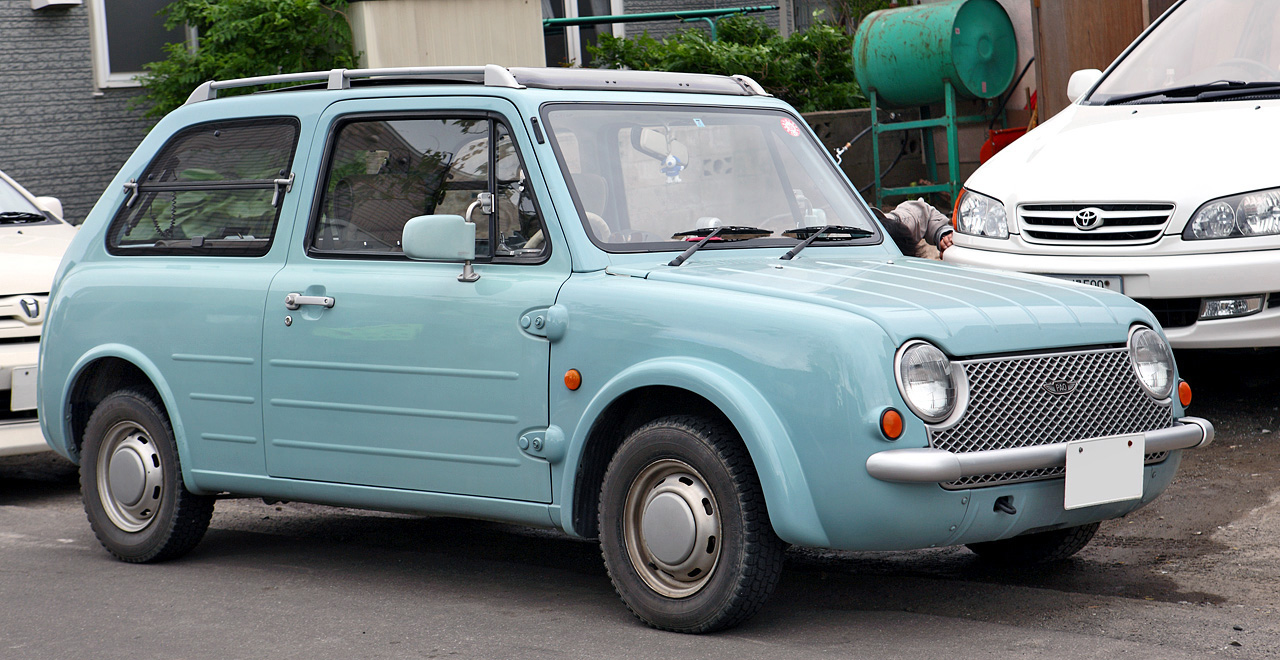
- Nissan Pao finished in Aqua Gray

Overview
- Manufacturer: Nissan Motors (Aichi Machine Industry)
- Model code: E-PK10
- Production: 1989–1991; 31,352 produced
- Assembly: Japan: Oppama Plant, Yokosuka, Kanagawa
- Designer: Yoshiro Kobata; Naoki Sakai

Body and chassis
- Related: Nissan Be-1; Nissan Figaro; Nissan March

Powertrain
- Engine: 1.0 L MA10S I4
- Transmission: 3-speed automatic; 5-speed manual

Dimensions
- Wheelbase: 2,300 mm (91 in)
- Length: 3,740 mm (147 in)
- Width: 1,570 mm (62 in)
- Height: 1,475 mm (58 in)
- Curb weight: 720–760 kg (1,587–1,676 lb)

The Nissan Pao (stylized as the PAO) is a retro-styled three-door hatchback manufactured by Nissan for model years 1989–1991, and originally marketed solely in Japan at their Nissan Cherry Stores.

First announced at the Tokyo Motor Show in October 1987, the Pao was available with or without a textile sun roof and was originally marketed without Nissan branding, by reservation only from 15 January through 14 April 1989. Orders were delivered on a first-come, first-served basis. With 51,657 applications for the vehicle, it sold out in 3 months. The UK's GTR-Registry website provided updated production figures in 2022 with per-colour code quantities, and a total production quantity of 31,352.

Because of its origins at Pike Factory, Nissan's special project group, the Pao – along with the Nissan Figaro, Be-1 and S-Cargo – are known as Nissan's "Pike cars". The promotional campaign for the car included a surreal and futuristic animated video featuring members of the Pike Factory team.

In 2011, noted design critic Phil Patton, writing for the New York Times, called the Pike cars "the height of postmodernism" and "unabashedly retro, promiscuously combining elements of the Citroën 2CV, Renault 4, Mini [and] Fiat 500".

== History ==
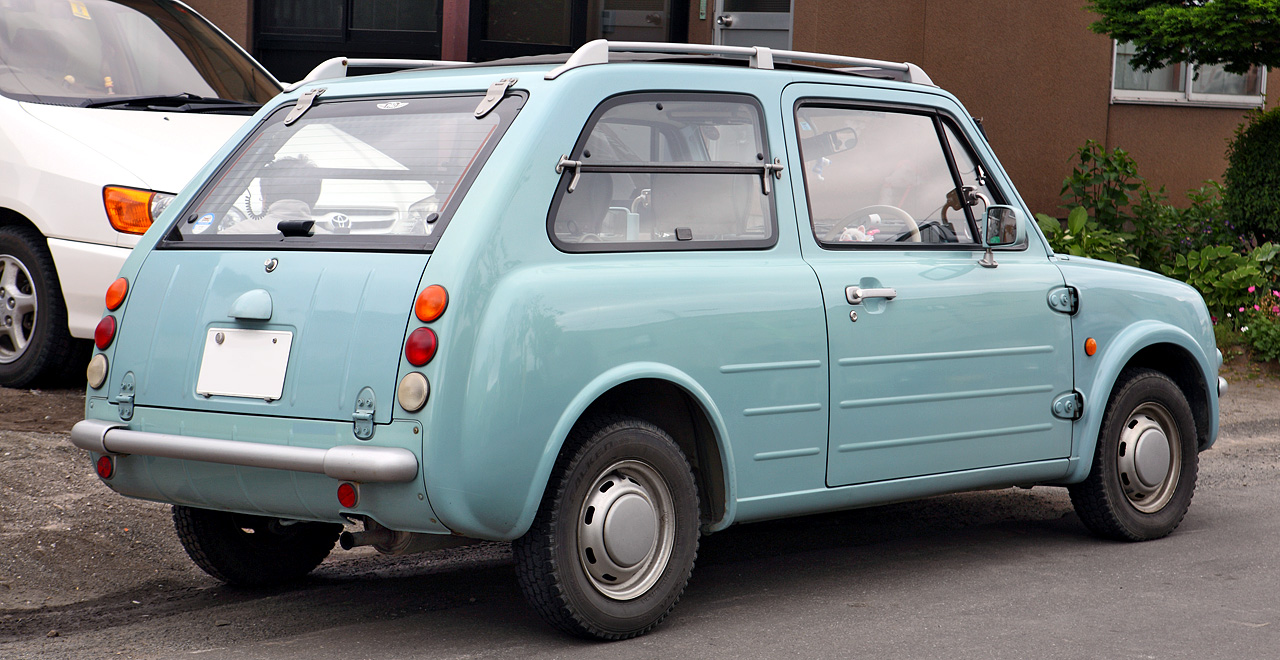
Nissan Pao finished in Aqua Gray (rear)

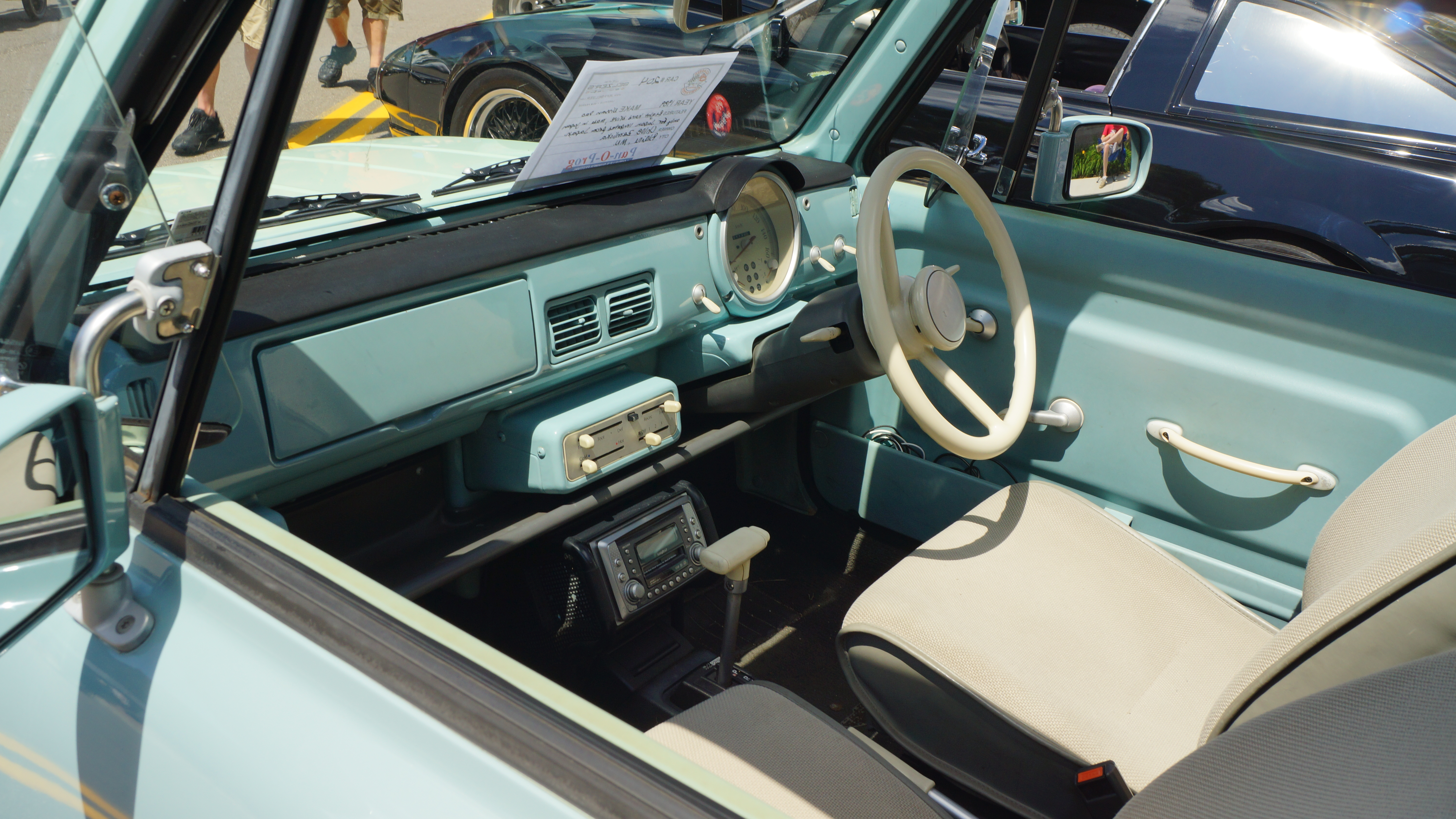
Interior

Part of Nissan's "Pike" series, it was designed as a retro fashionable city car in the mould of the Be-1. It included external door hinges like the original 1960s Austin Mini which had become fashionable in Japan, 'flap-up' windows like those of a Citroën 2CV, and a split rear tailgate of the first British hatchback car the Austin A40 Farina Countryman. The Be-1, Pao, Figaro, and S-Cargo were attempts to create cars with designs as desirable as those of Panasonic, Sony, and other personal electronics products. The Pao's side strakes evoked the construction of earlier Woodie car body styles.

The Pao's body variations included a metal or canvas top.

The design of the Pao is usually credited to Naoki Sakai who also worked for Olympus, where he brought back "the brushed aluminium look". Sakai also helped design Toyota's later WiLL cars, which echo the Pike series.

== Specifications ==
The Pao's chassis included rack and pinion steering, independent suspension with struts in front and 4-links and coil springs in back. Brakes were discs up front and drums in the rear. It has a clamshell hatch in back, meaning the glass section swings up and the bottom portion opens down to create a tailgate. The tires were of 155/SR12 format. The compact Pao requires just 4.4 m (14.4 ft) to turn.

Due to its length and engine size it is too large to be considered a Kei car (light car) in Japan, and is instead classified as a small size passenger vehicle. It could seat five people. The front/rear tread is 1,355 mm (53.3 in) - 1,365 mm (53.7 in), and ground clearance is 165 mm (6.5 in). The car weighs 720 kg (1,587.3 lb) to 760 kg (1,675.5 lb), with a gross vehicle weight of 995 kg (2,193.6 lb) to 1,035 kg (2,281.8 lb).

The car was offered in four exterior colours: Aqua Gray (#FJ-0) (16,900 produced), Olive Gray (#DJ-0) (6,488 produced), Ivory (#EJ-I) (6,362 produced), Terracotta (#AJ-0) (1,595 produced); there was also one each produced in Gold (#EJ-0) and Blue-black (#BG-8). Exterior paint colours were finished with a fluoropolymer coating. The interior matched the body color, a large single round meter, and a straight, two-spoke steering wheel. Air conditioning and a car stereo were optional.

The engine was shares from the March's 1.0 L (987 cc) MA10S, a water-cooled inline 4-cylinder and 1-bbl carburettor. The engine had a total cubic displacement of 987 cc and a compression ratio of 9.5:1. Cylinder bore and stroke was 68.0 x 68.0 mm. Net output was 52 PS (38 kW; 51 hp) at 6000 rpm and largest net torque with 75 N⋅m (55 lb⋅ft) at 3600 rpm. The engine was coupled with a three-speed automatic transmission (model code PK10GA) or a five-speed manual transmission (model code PK10GF), the manual being the more sought after. The engine produced 52 PS (38 kW; 51 hp) at 6,000 rpm and 7.6 kg⋅m (75 N⋅m; 55 lbf⋅ft) at 3,600 rpm. The canvas top sun roof version also had the option of a five-speed manual (PK10GFW) or three-speed automatic (PK10GAW).

The car uses unleaded regular fuel with a 40 L (2,441 cu in) tank capacity. In the city, it could deliver up to 5.4 L/100 km (44 mpg‑US) for the manual and 6.9 L/100 km (34 mpg‑US) for the automatic, and on the highway up to 3.4 L/100 km (69 mpg‑US) for the manual and 4.3 L/100 km (55 mpg‑US) for the automatic.

It featured standard equipment including power steering, intermittent wiper, radio and tape deck, height-adjustable driver's seat, tensionless ELR seat belts (front seats), and an electromagnetic glass hatch release. Optional extras were a clock, tonneau cover/parcel shelf, drinks holder, dash tray, under-dash tray, leather steering wheel grips, combination stereo/CD deck, rear speakers, fog lamp and front guard bar, lightweight aluminium wheels, and a ‘serviceable car kit’ comprising polish, brush, wash mitt, silver gloves, chamois and paperwork wallet, supplied in a courier-style bag made of Pao seat fabric.

== Paoside ==
Paoside was a range of Pao-specific products featuring the Pao logo which included accessories, clothing, toy cars and other items.

== Appearances in media ==
The Nissan Pao has made at least 30 appearances in films and television series, including the opening scenes of Gareth Edwards’ 2014 film adaptation of Godzilla, myriad Asian films and television and Jeremy Clarkson’s Motorworld, listed at the IMCDb database. A segment filmed for Japanese motoring magazine Drift Tengoku, featuring professional drifter Ken Nomura attempting to drift a heavily modified Nissan Pao alongside the car's owner, D1 Grand Prix Lights Team driver Kazayuki Akuzawa, helped bring the car to fans of Japanese Domestic Market vehicles previously unfamiliar with the model.
