= WiLL =

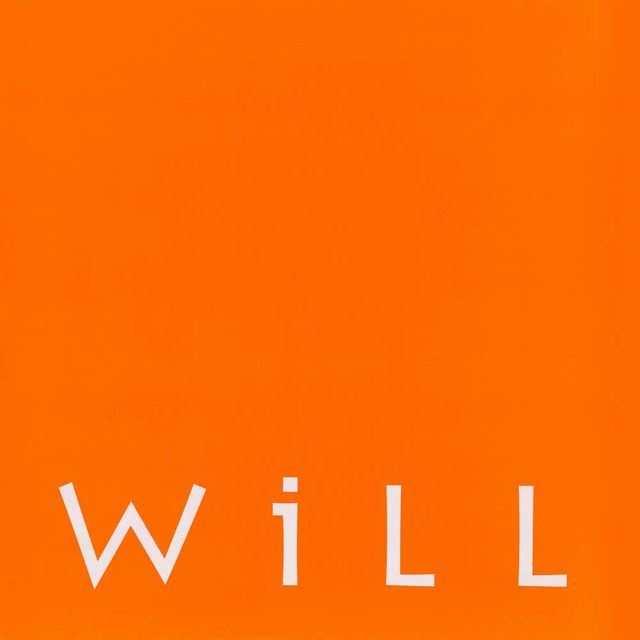
- Founded: 8 August 1999
- Defunct: July 2004
- Fate: Defunct
- Owner: Toyota

The WiLL brand was a marketing approach shared by a small group of Japanese companies who decided to offer products and services that focused on a younger demographic from August 1999 until July 2004 in Japan. The companies that participated were the Kao Corporation (a manufacturer of personal hygiene, household detergents, and cosmetics), Toyota, Asahi Breweries, Panasonic, Kinki Nippon Tourist Company, Ltd, Ezaki Glico Candy, and Kokuyo Co., Ltd. (an office furniture and stationery manufacturer). Toyota also engaged in a similar "youth oriented" approach in North America, with the Project Genesis program. This selective marketing experiment reflected a Japanese engineering philosophy called Kansei engineering, which was used by other Japanese companies. All products were listed online at "willshop.com".

== WiLL-branded products or services ==
- Asahi
  - WiLL Smooth Beer (28 October 1999)
  - WiLL Sweet Brown Beer (23 March 2000)
  - WiLL B-side (July 2001)
  - WiLL BeFree (14 November 2001)
  - WiLL Via Smooth
- Ezaki Glico
  - WiLL On time Chocolate (19 September 2000)
  - WiLL Tablet Relax (19 September 2000)
  - WiLL Ice for Relax (5 March 2001)
  - WiLL Black Beans Candy
  - WiLL Refresh Capsules (12 November 2002)
- Kao
  - WiLL clear mist
  - WiLL air freshener
  - WiLL OneWeek room freshener
- Panasonic
  - WiLL Fax Machine ( WiLL Fax PW100CL ) and attached handset ( KX-PW110CL )
  - WiLL Collapsible Bike (WiLL Bike series, later WiLL E-Bike, battery powered)
  - WiLL Mini Fridge (WiLL Fridge NR-B162R)
  - WiLL Vacuum Cleaner (WiLL Cleaner)
  - WiLL Desktop PC with LCD (WiLL PC)
  - WiLL Alkaline ion water conditioner (WiLL A-Pure PJ-A301)
  - WiLL Air purifier (WiLL Ion Conditioner)
  - WiLL Microwave (WiLL Range)
  - WiLL Full automatic washing machine with drying function (WiLL Laundry)
  - WiLL seat cushion heater (WiLL Cushion Heater)
  - WiLL Portable MD Player (WiLL MD)
  - WiLL SD Multi Camera (WiLL D-Snap)
  - WiLL DVD stereo system (WiLL Theater)
  - WiLL Video built-in type TV (WiLL Televideo)
  - WiLL Fridge
- Kokuyo
  - WiLL stationery "Actic"
- Kinki Nippon Tourist
  - WiLL Tour (Overseas travel)
  - WiLL City and Resort Tour
  - WiLL Tour Hokkaido
  - WiLL Tour Kyushu
  - WiLL Tour Okinawa
  - WiLL Tour Sport

== Toyota WiLL vehicles ==
Toyota offered three individually designed cars, based on the mechanicals of existing Toyota models. The series was intended to appeal to markets that were not covered by Toyota's mainstream range, and to discover how commercially feasible such unusual designs were. The American Scion range is based on a similar concept. All WiLL vehicles were only sold in Japan, and only at Toyota Vista Store locations. When the WiLL project ended in 2004, Toyota stopped producing WiLL-branded vehicles, and renamed the Toyota Vista dealerships to Toyota NETZ, that coincided with the launch of the North American introduction of Scion, using lessons learned from the WiLL project.

Unlike other Toyota brands, the WiLL series does not use the Toyota emblem.

=== WiLL Vi ===
WiLL Vi
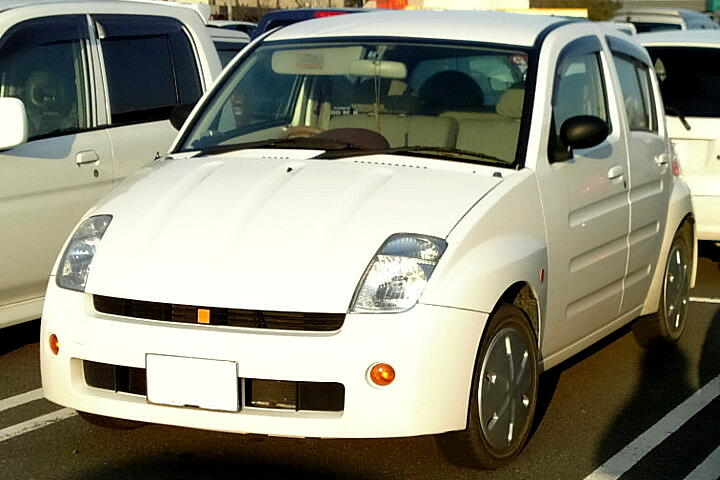

Overview
- Manufacturer: Toyota
- Model code: NCP19
- Production: 17 January 2000 – 25 December 2001; 16,649 units
- Assembly: Ohira, Japan (Central Motors); Yokosuka, Japan (Kanto Auto Works)
- Designer: Michio Tada; Jiro Goto

Body and chassis
- Class: Subcompact
- Body style: 4-door sedan
- Layout: Front-engine, front-wheel-drive
- Platform: NBC platform
- Related: Toyota Vitz (XP10)

Powertrain
- Engine: 2NZ-FE 1.3 L I4 DOHC
- Transmission: 4-speed automatic

Dimensions
- Wheelbase: 2,370 mm (93.3 in)
- Length: 3,760 mm (148.0 in)
- Width: 1,660 mm (65.4 in)
- Height: 1,600 mm (63.0 in)
- Curb weight: 950 kg (2,090 lb)

The WiLL Vi is a subcompact car, it was unveiled in 1999 Tokyo Motor Show as the concept car, and released in 17 January 2000, with distinctive styling combining elements of many cars. The WiLL Vi was designed by the then newly formed Virtual Venture Company, headed by Jim Shimizu. The unique-appearing rear window had earlier appeared on the Mazda Carol, late Reliant Regals, the Ford Anglia (1959–1968), and the Citroen Ami. The "neo-retro" look represented a period in Japan where vehicles took on the styling of historic vehicles from the 1950s and 1960s, such as the Nissan Be-1, Nissan Figaro, Nissan S-Cargo, Nissan Pao, the Toyota Origin, the Subaru Vivio Bistro, and the Mitsubishi Minica Town Bee. The curve of the tail section is also similar to that of the second generation of the Renault Mégane.

The WiLL Vi shares a platform with the XP10 Vitz, and it was equipped with a 1.3L 2NZ-FE engine and 4-speed manual. The Vi was equipped with MacPherson struts for the front wheels and a torsion beam axle for the rear wheels. The car was painted in a number of pastel colors, and the plastic wheel covers resemble sand dollars. One of the few options was a canvas sliding roof, and the vehicle was installed with bench seats for both front and rear passengers, with the gearshift installed on the dashboard.

Although it fell short of plans, Toyota stated that it had achieved its initial objectives, as it had sold approximately 15,000 units by the end of August 2001. Toyota claims that most of its buyers are women. It was discontinued in December 2001 and replaced the WiLL Cypha.

According to Toyota, the Vi nameplate is a portmanteau of the Will is derived from future, and The "i" in Vi is derived from "I," "identity," "independence," and "individual," reflecting the target audience of single women in their late twenties who are independent.

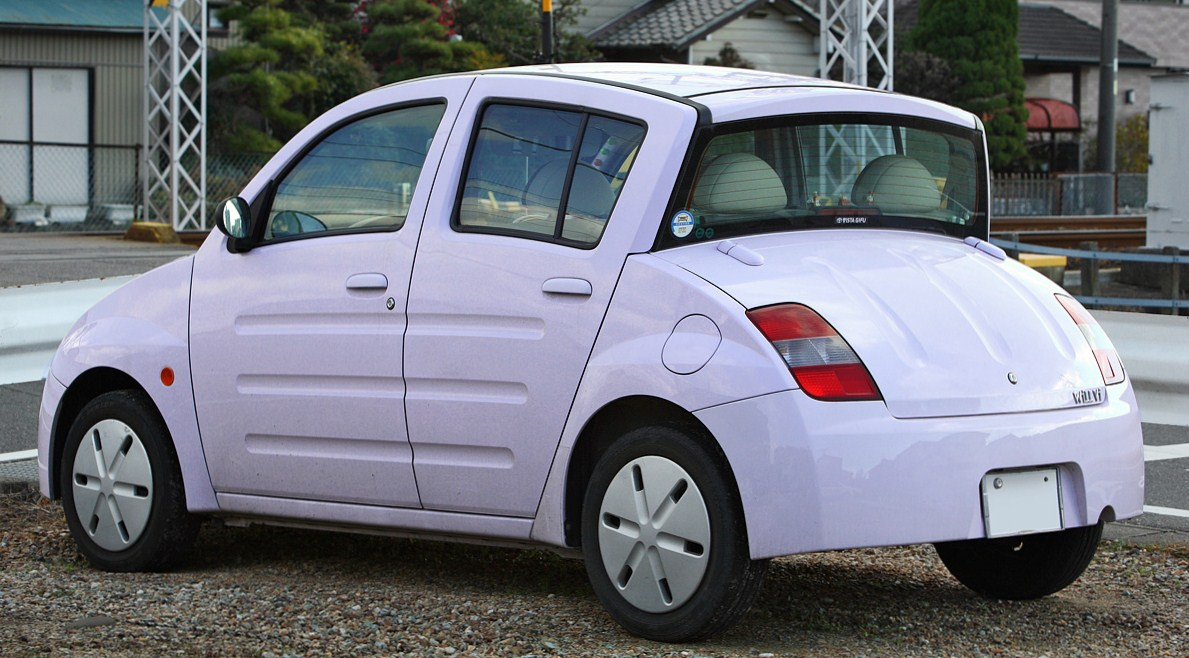
WiLL Vi (Jan 2000 – Dec 2001)

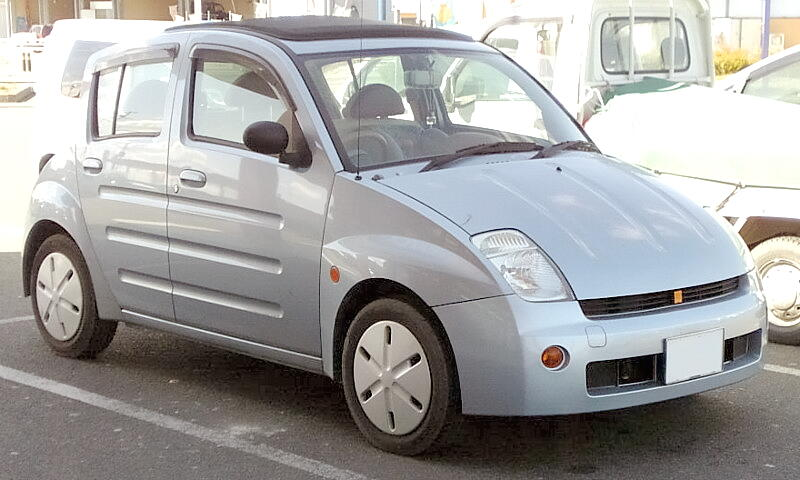
Canvas top variant

=== WiLL VS ===
WiLL VS
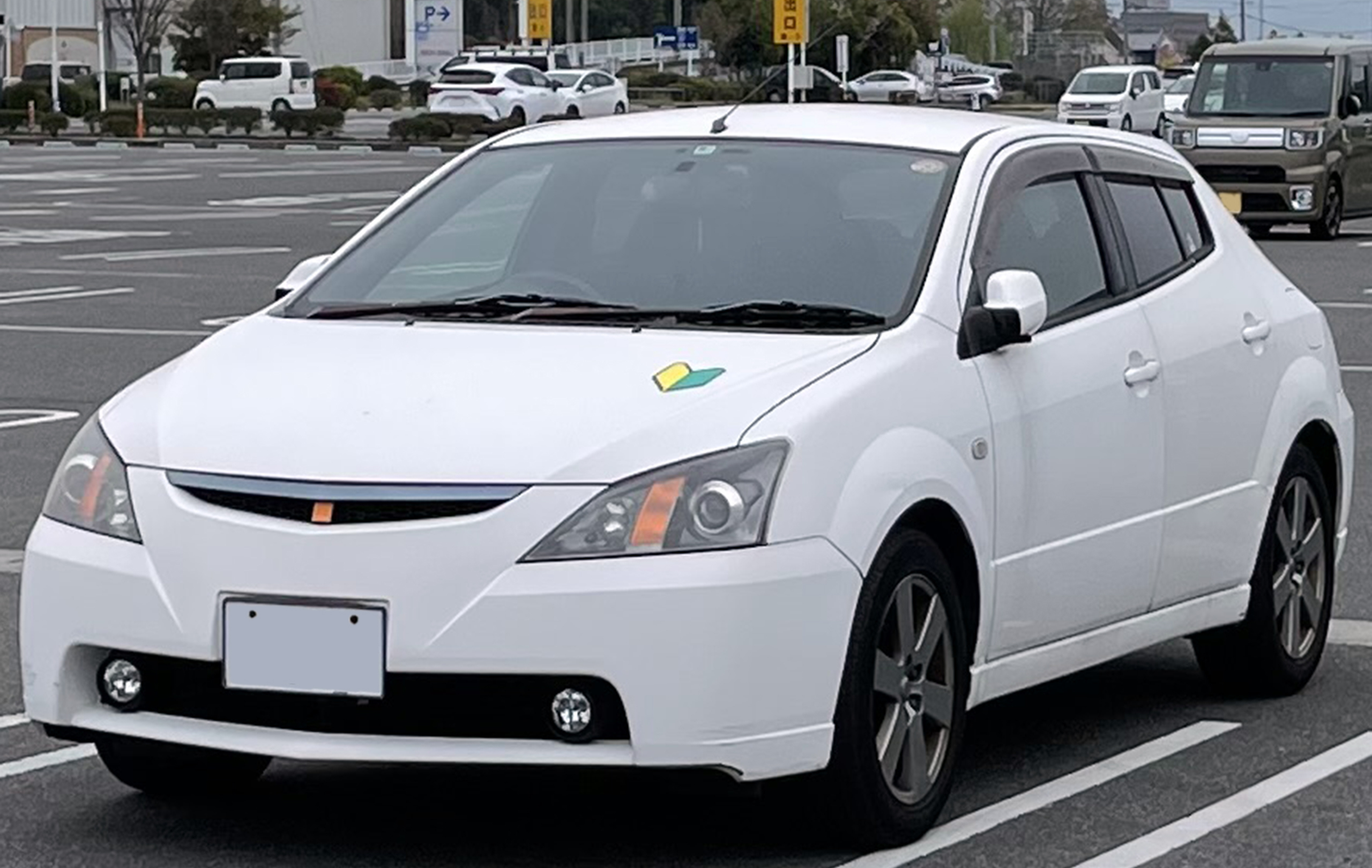

Overview
- Manufacturer: Toyota
- Model code: E12
- Production: 6 April 2001 – 30 April 2004; 14,985 units
- Assembly: Ohira, Japan (Central Motors); Yokosuka, Japan (Kanto Auto Works)
- Designer: Hiroo Ono

Body and chassis
- Class: Compact
- Body style: 5-door hatchback
- Layout: Front-engine, front-wheel-drive; Front-engine, four-wheel-drive
- Platform: MC platform
- Related: Toyota Corolla (E120)

Powertrain
- Engine: 1NZ-FE 1.5 L I4 DOHC; 1ZZ-FE 1.8 L VVT-i I4 DOHC; 2ZZ-GE 1.8 L VVTL-i I4 DOHC
- Power output: 108 hp (81 kW; 109 PS) (NZE127; 1.5L); 134 hp (100 kW; 136 PS) (ZZE127; 1.8L FWD); 188 hp (140 kW; 191 PS) (ZZE128; 1.8L VVTL-i); 124 hp (92 kW; 126 PS) (ZZE129; 1.8L 4WD)
- Transmission: 4-speed automatic 6-speed manual

Dimensions
- Wheelbase: 2,600 mm (102.4 in)
- Length: 4,385 mm (172.6 in)
- Width: 1,720 mm (67.7 in)
- Height: 1,440 mm (56.7 in)
- Curb weight: 1,220 kg (2,690 lb)

Chronology
- Successor: Toyota Allex

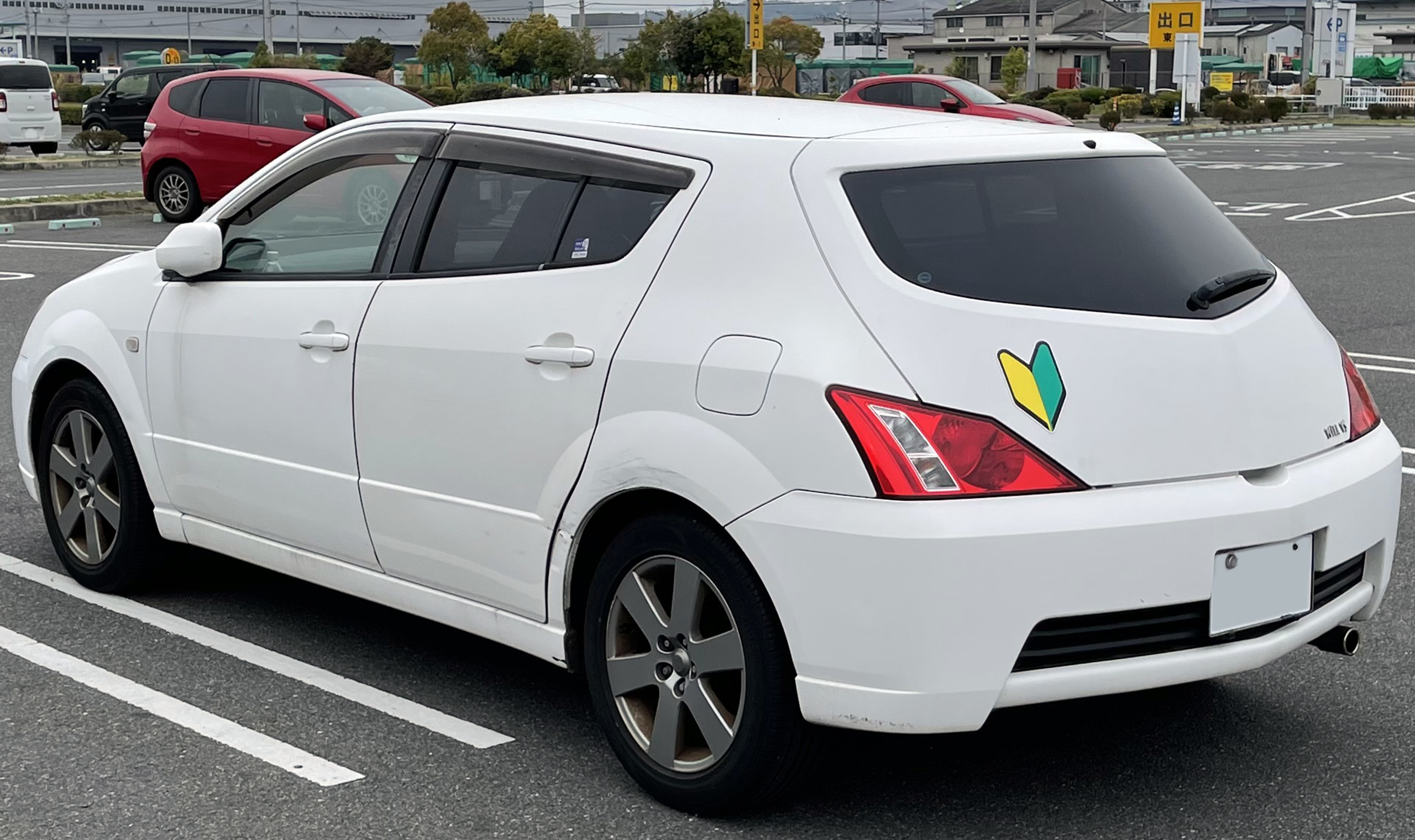
WiLL VS (Jan 2001 – Apr 2004)

The WiLL VS was first introduced in 2001. It was formally introduced at the 2001 Los Angeles Auto Show, as a precursor to the introduction of Scion to North America, and sales in the Japanese market in April of that year under a massive publicity campaign with British electronic group Underworld. The TV commercial featured their hit, "Born Slippy," originally released six years prior. The WiLL VS was manufactured at Kanto Auto Works. Inspiration for the design of the WiLL VS was said to have been derived from the Lockheed F-117 Nighthawk Stealth Fighter. It also has many appearance similarities to the Renault Avantime.

The WiLL VS came in three levels of trim. The top of the range model came with alloy wheels, fog-lamps, body kit and tiptronic gearshift. Models are available in automatic transmission, tiptronic, and a six-speed manual, powered by Toyota's 1800 cc VVT-I engine offering 140 hp or VVTL-I engine offering 180 hp, which is the unit in the higher spec Toyota Celica. The VS joined the revised Vi, renamed the Cypha, and offered WiLL buyers the choice of a wider car with a more powerful engine. The width dimensions of the VS exceeded Japanese Government regulations that taxed vehicles based on exterior dimensions, which buyers of the VS were liable.

In spite of its success in the Japanese market, where the WiLL VS had a cult following, the model was never released overseas. Production of the WiLL VS was stopped in April 2004 and a replacement model was never announced, much to the disappointment of its fans. Nevertheless, some would argue that there was no need to replace the WiLL VS for at least another decade given its futuristic design that some of the newer cars were only beginning to adopt. This would include trend-setting features such as the rakish body shape, aerodynamic angles, projector-style headlamp cluster (regarded as revolutionary in 2001), illuminated speedometer and clear LED tail lights.

The car was used as the police vehicle in the 2001 Hong Kong Film "2002" .

The car was used as the police vehicle "Machine Bull" in the 2004 Super Sentai series Tokusou Sentai Dekaranger and was used in the intro for its American adaptation Power Rangers SPD.

The WiLL VS is one of the few concept vehicles that went into production, albeit only in small numbers, only 15,000 were ever produced. In the years to follow, several other vehicles have taken styling cues from the WiLL VS, most notably the 2004 Opel Astra and the Renault Mégane.

=== WiLL Cypha ===
WiLL Cypha
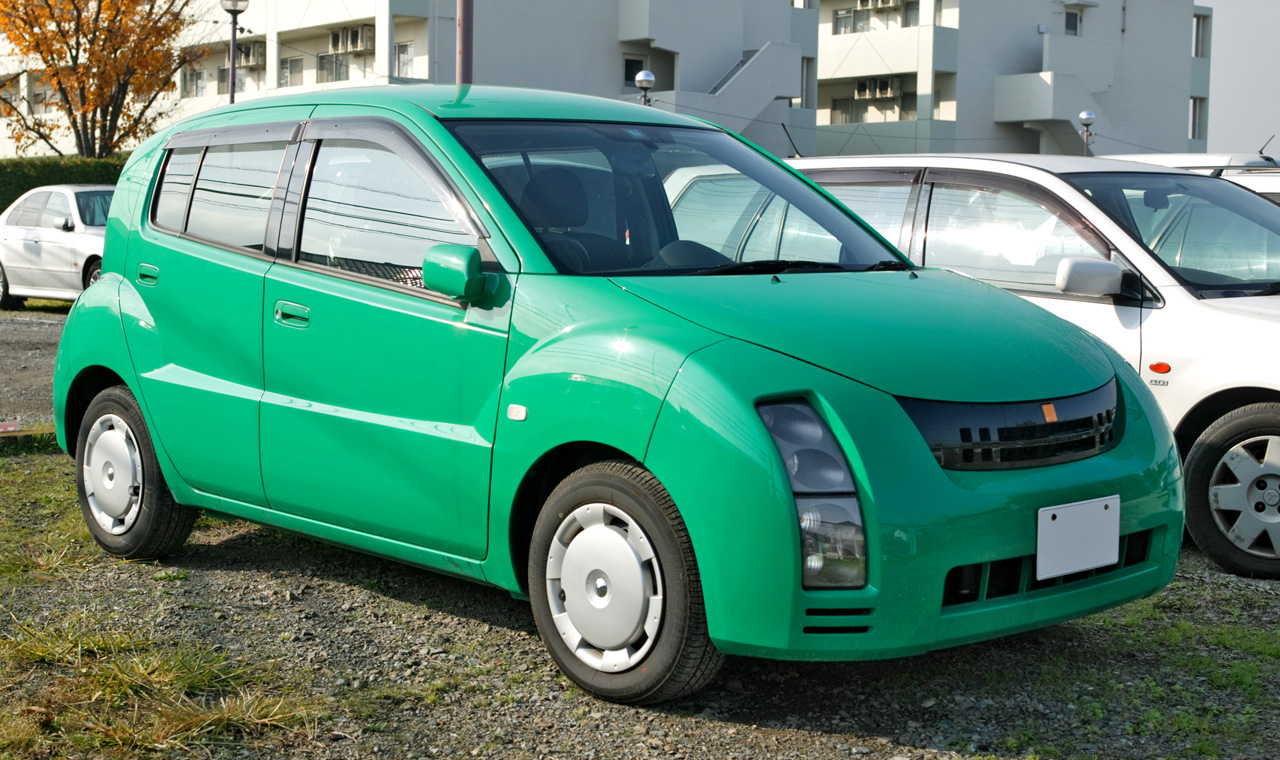

Overview
- Manufacturer: Toyota
- Model code: NCP7
- Production: September 2002 – February 2005; 31,856 Units
- Assembly: Ohira, Japan (Central Motors)

Body and chassis
- Class: Subcompact
- Body style: 5-door hatchback
- Layout: Front-engine, front-wheel-drive; Front-engine, four-wheel-drive
- Platform: NBC platform
- Related: Toyota Vitz (XP10)

Powertrain
- Engine: 2NZ-FE 1.3 L I4 DOHC; 1NZ-FE 1.5 L I4 DOHC
- Transmission: 4-speed automatic

Dimensions
- Wheelbase: 2,370 mm (93.3 in)
- Length: 3,695 mm (145.5 in)
- Width: 1,675 mm (65.9 in)
- Height: 1,550 mm (61.0 in) AWD; 1,535 mm (60.4 in)
- Curb weight: 1,090 kg (2,400 lb) AWD; 990 kg (2,180 lb)

The WiLL Cypha was produced from 2002 to 2005. It shared many of its mechanicals, including the 1.3-litre 2NZ and 1.5-litre 1NZ engines, with the Ist. Its styling developed themes seen in the Vitz/Yaris, but has a more angular look, a continuation of the short-lived WiLL Vi. Notable features are the rear lights placed level with the rear window, giving a look of the Renault Mégane II, and the distinctive headlights which have four lamps per side arranged vertically. The interior used a rounded theme, with items such as the door pulls and the central console being circular. All Will VCs and WiLL Cyphas were manufactured by Central Motors at its "Headquarters plant" located at Ohira, Miyagi, Japan.

It was announced as WiLL VC in 2001 but was released as WiLL Cypha in October 2002.

The Cypha (the words "cyber" and "phaeton" combined) is sold exclusively at Corolla and Netz Dealers. It was one of the first Toyota vehicles to be installed with their vehicle telematics system called G-Book. The vehicle was also promoted with a sales approach called "pay as you go" meaning that you were given the option not to buy the car with monthly payments, but to instead lease the car, and only pay a monthly bill based on how far you drove in a month. When the driver no longer wanted the vehicle, they returned the car to the Toyota dealership.

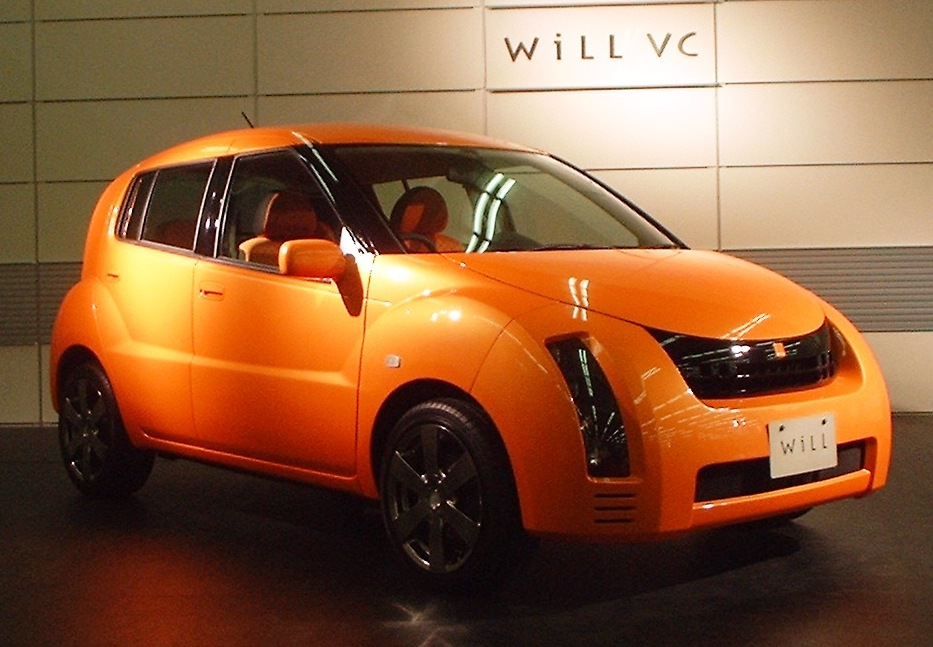
WiLL VC

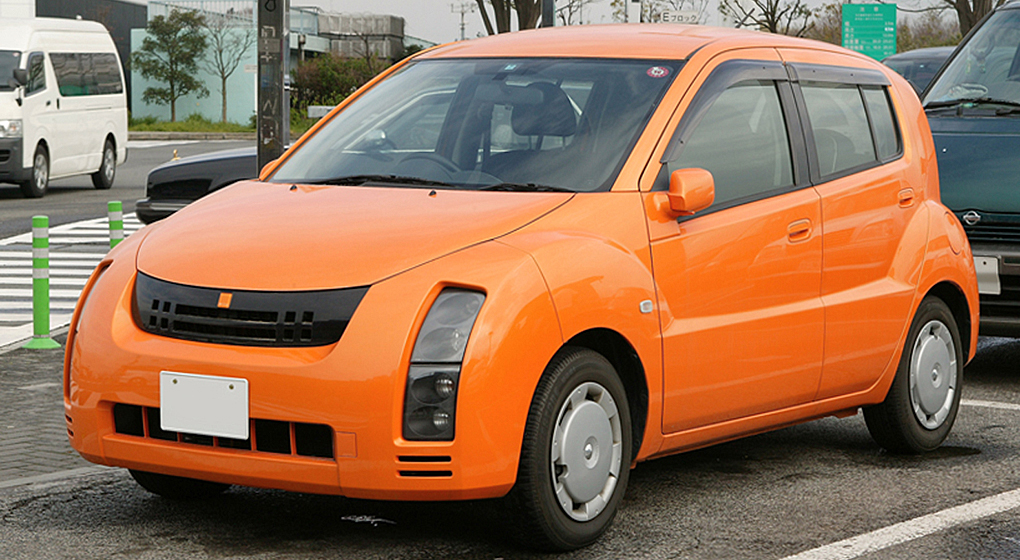
WiLL Cypha (September 2002 – Feb 2005)

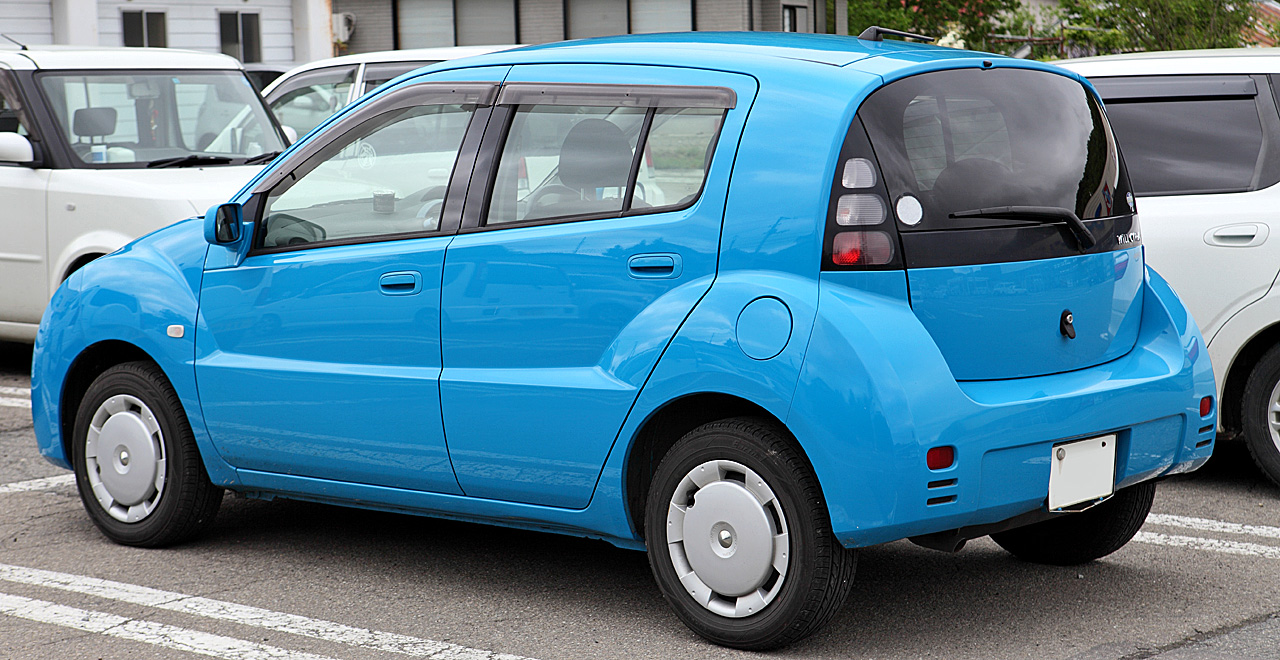
WiLL Cypha (September 2002 – Feb 2005)
