= Naoki Sakai =

Naoki Sakai may refer to:

- Naoki Sakai (footballer), Japanese midfielder
- Naoki Sakai (industrial designer), professor and Nissan designer
