= Tengoku =

Tengoku (天国) is the Japanese word for Heaven and may refer to:

- Drift Tengoku, an automobile magazine
- Rhythm Tengoku, a music video game
- Tengoku Kara no Yell, a film
- Tengoku Daimakyō, a manga
