= Naoki Sakai (industrial designer) =

Japanese industrial designer (born 1947)

Naoki Sakai (坂井 直樹, Sakai Naoki; born 1947 in Kyoto) is a Japanese industrial designer who known as the designer of Nissan's pike car series with its retro-future design. Currently, he is a professor of Keio University Shonan Fujisawa Campus (SFC), a guest design director for au, and the manager of his own company, waterdesign. He has collaborated with companies such as Nissan, Suzuki, Toyota (WiLL), Olympus, KDDI, and Cassina.

The S Cargo was not designed by Sakai. Sakai led the Pike designs and created a proposal for the Nissan Figaro, but the design selected for final production (first shown at the 1989 Tokyo Motor Show) was designed by Nissan's in-house design team, led by Jim Shimizu (Shimizu Jun).

== Major works ==
- Nissan Motors

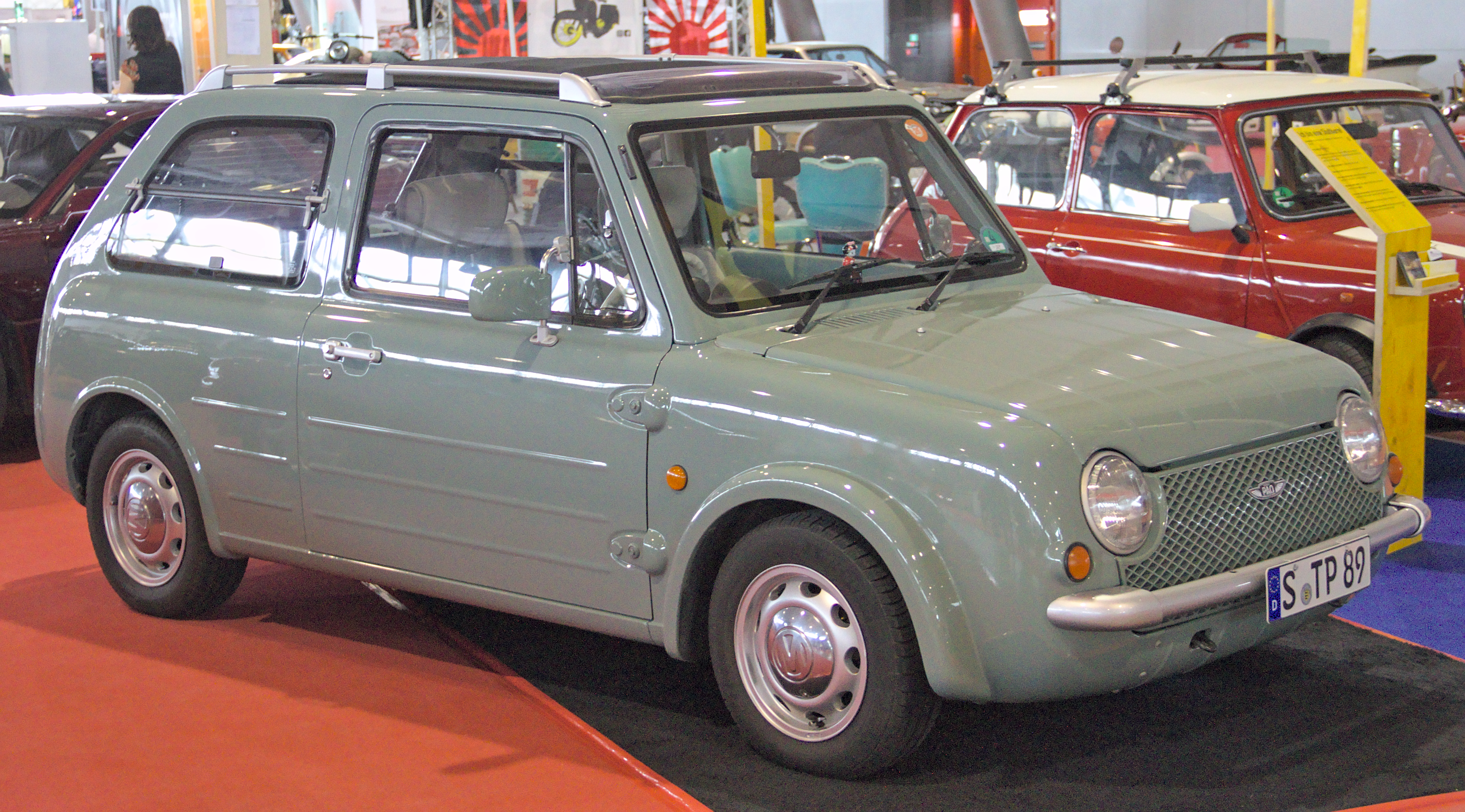
Nissan Pao

  - Be-1 (1987)
  - Pao (1989)
  - Rasheen (1994)
- Suzuki SW-1 (1992)
- Olympus

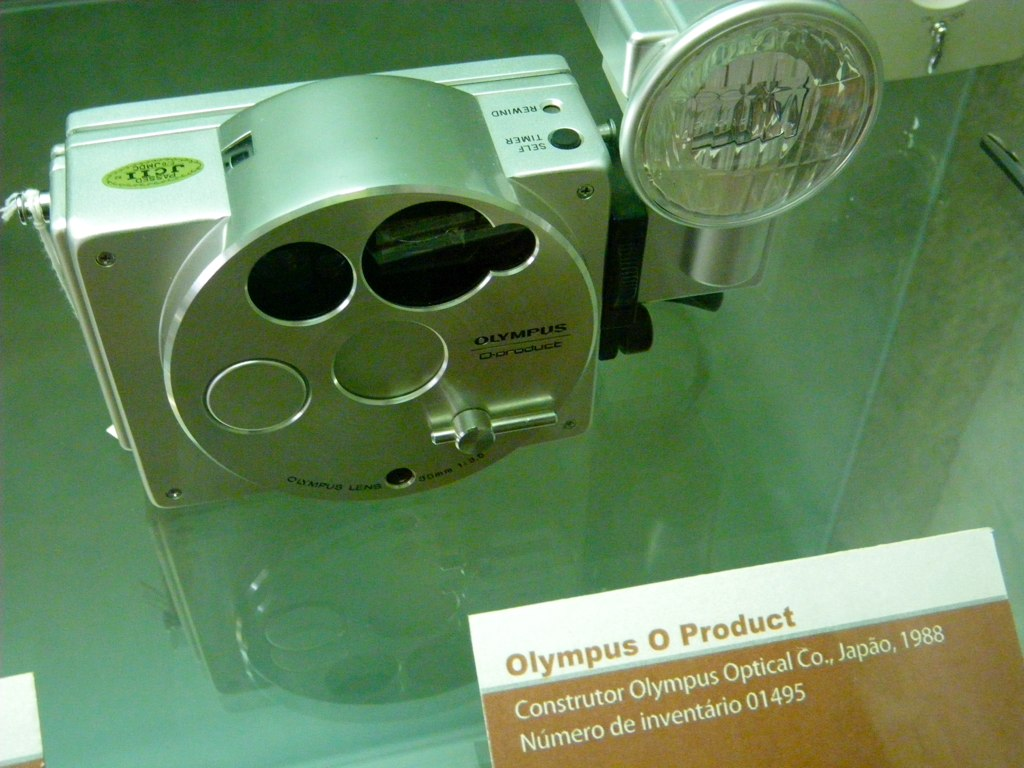
Olympus O-Product

  - o-product (1988)
  - Ecru (1991)
- au design project
  - HEXAGON (2005)
  - MACHINA (2005)
  - DRAPE (2006)
- Toray
  - torayvino aqua meister (2007)
