= Blitz (company) =

Japanese automotive aftermarket company

Blitz Co., Ltd.
- Trade name: Blitz
- Native name: 株式会社ブリッツ
- Romanized name: Burittsu kabushiki gaisha
- Company type: Kabushiki gaisha
- Industry: Automotive
- Founded: June 1981; 45 years ago
- Headquarters: Nishitōkyō, Tokyo, Japan
- Key people: Satoshi Yamaguchi (Representative director)
- Number of employees: 4000
- Website: www.blitz.co.jp

Blitz Co., Ltd. is a tuning company headquartered in Nishitōkyō, Tokyo, Japan. It formerly specialized in turbo compression using Kühnle, Kopp & Kausch turbos on their first achievements, Blitz is now a general tuner offering parts ranging from simple pressure gauge to supercharging kit, including body kits.

== Motorsports ==
Blitz also stands out in motorsport events such as in D1GP and drag racing. In D1GP, the company is represented by Ken Nomura and his Blitz D1 Spec ER34 Skyline. Blitz is also present in drag racing thanks to a Toyota Supra which cuts the quarter mile in about 9 seconds.

== Media ==
Blitz is featured prominently in the racing manga and anime series, MF Ghost, with the company's logo appearing prominently on the main character's Toyota 86.
