= Toyota Project Genesis =

Plan by Toyota to attract younger customers

Project Genesis was a plan by the Toyota Motor Sales USA to attract more youthful buyers to the company's products. Widely considered by the media to be one of Toyota's worst flops, the experiment provided the foundation for Toyota's Scion marque. The endeavors of this approach were also used in the home market of Japan. The Japanese market efforts were the result of several Japanese companies contributing products or services under the WiLL brandname, and Toyota's contribution was three vehicles offered at restructured Toyota Japanese sales channels from Toyota Vista Store to Toyota Netz Store.

Launched in 1999, Project Genesis was a task force formed by Yoshimi Inaba, president of Toyota Motor Sales USA and James Press, COO of TMS. They intended to take three new products which were about to be introduced and sell them as a "marque within a marque" through Toyota's United States and Japanese dealer network.

The cars, the Celica, MR2 Spyder, and Echo, would be bundled together and advertised differently from other Toyota models. At the time, in America, these vehicles were in segments that were shrinking and not necessarily considered typical youth segments. Regardless, the parent company in Japan challenged Toyota USA to market these existing products as "youth" vehicles.

The Toyota ECHO was a global vehicle sold in Asia and Europe under the name Yaris. It attracted young American buyers in the first year of its launch, but the average age would creep up in subsequent years. The ECHO has since been replaced by the global brand Yaris nameplate. The MR2 Spyder, named the MR-S in Japan, did not sell very well either, as it was believed to be impractical for younger generation buyers. Little storage room, low seating capacity, and other problems are common to two seater convertibles, but they are inconvenient when it's the owner's only car. Another problem was the important restrictions imposed on Toyota; these caused severe dealer markups and made the car less accessible to younger buyers. The MR2 Spyder did at least sell well with the tuner market and older demographics. The Celica, on the other hand, was at first successful with younger buyers. In 2000, its first model year being sold under the 'Project Genesis' marque, sold over 65,000 units. Sales started to trail off towards it final 2005 model year, in which only 15,000 units were sold. In later years the Toyota Matrix was added to the 'Project Genesis' lineup.

With a limited budget, minimal product input, and strong internal political resistance, Genesis struggled to make the enduring marketing impact it set out to accomplish for the launch of these three vehicles. Hence came Toyota's 'Project Exodus'.

In 2001, Genesis was officially brought to a close by the announcement that Toyota Motor Sales USA decided to launch a separate marque, Scion, a move known as 'Project Exodus'. Scion's success can be directly attributed to the lessons learned from the Genesis experience and struggles.

There was also a specific website dedicated to the project named "isthistoyota" and had a change in rhetoric to appeal to the younger buyers. This site now redirects to the Toyota USA site.
