= Nissan MA engine =

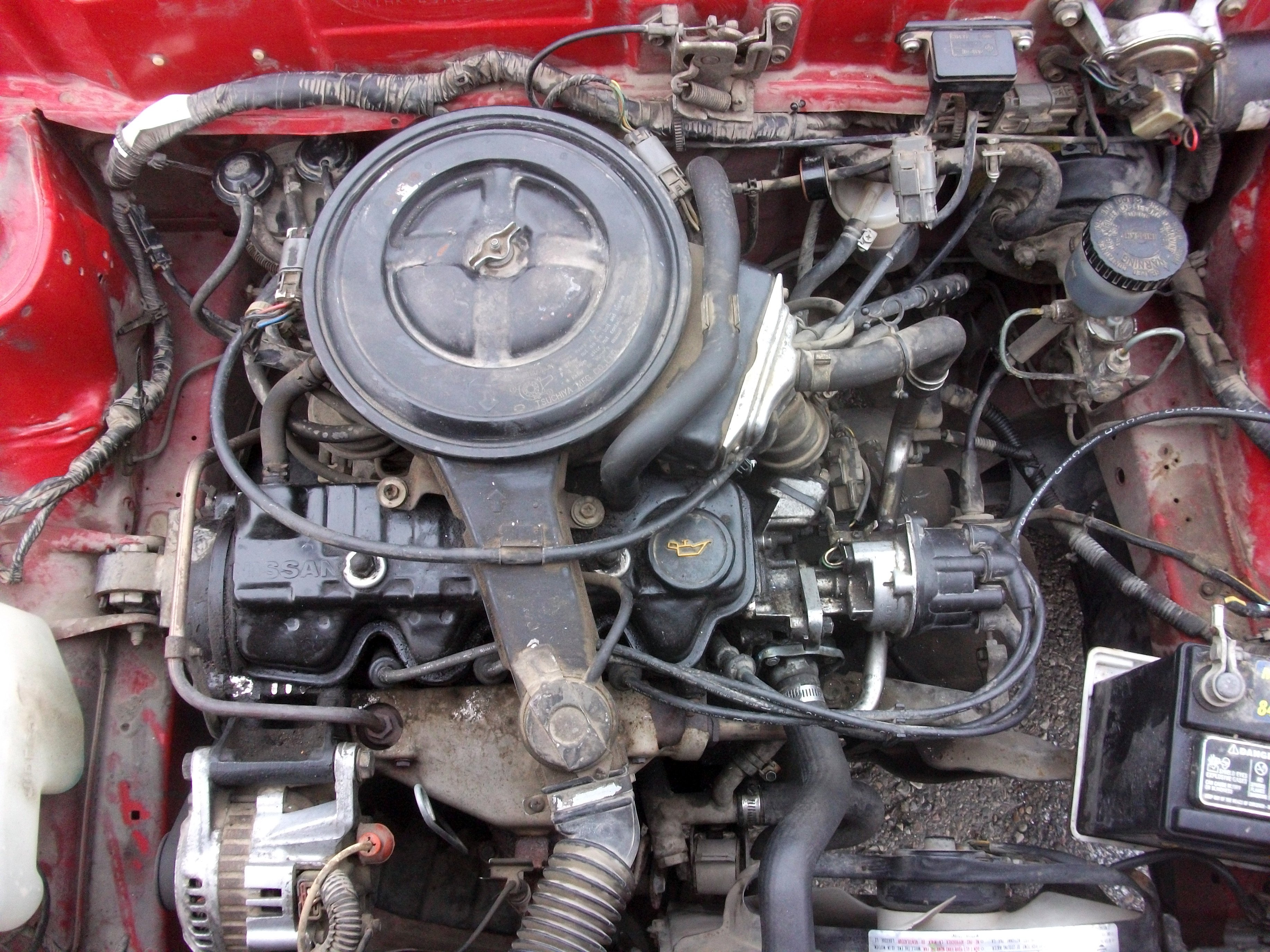

Overview
- Manufacturer: Nissan Motors
- Production: 1983-1992

Layout
- Configuration: Inline-4
- Displacement: 0.9 L (930 cc); 1.0 L (988 cc); 1.2 L (1,235 cc)
- Cylinder bore: 66 mm (2.60 in); 68 mm (2.68 in); 71 mm (2.80 in)
- Piston stroke: 68 mm (2.68 in); 78 mm (3.07 in)
- Cylinder block material: Aluminium
- Cylinder head material: Aluminium
- Valvetrain: SOHC, 2 valves per cylinder
- Compression ratio: 7.7:1, 8.0:1, 9.0:1, 9.5:1

Combustion
- Turbocharger: Single turbocharger (MA10ET); Twincharger (MA09ERT)
- Fuel system: Fuel injection (MA09ERT, MA10E, MA10ET); Carburetor (MA10S, MA12S)
- Fuel type: Gasoline
- Cooling system: Water cooled

Output
- Power output: 50–110 PS (37–81 kW; 49–108 hp)
- Torque output: 75–130 N⋅m (55–96 lb⋅ft)

Dimensions
- Dry weight: 111 kg (245 lb)

Chronology
- Successor: Nissan CG engine

The Nissan MA engine is a straight-4 SOHC 0.9 L, 1.0 L, or 1.2 L engine introduced in 1982 by Nissan, intended primarily for the K10 series Micra/March model. It shares design elements with the older E engine, such as 8-valve hemispherical cylinder head, but differs in that it uses an aluminium cylinder block. Unusually, the specified ignition timing for the MA10 running on the specified 90 RON gasoline was 2 degrees after top dead centre, reflecting the high flame speed in the compact combustion chambers.

== MA09ERT ==
The MA09ERT is a twin-charged design (possessing both a turbocharger and a supercharger), an unusual design, particularly for Japanese vehicles. It powered the March Superturbo, March R, and the March Superturbo R.

The "Nissan PLASMA" (Powerful & Economic, Light, Accurate, Silent, Mighty, Advanced) improved performance and response by adding a supercharger to the (already turbocharged) MA10ET engine, which is a four-cylinder water-cooled OHC engine with a V-type valve arrangement and hemispherical combustion chambers, with sequential fuel injection.

The supercharger improved the response and output in the low-rpm region (where turbochargers are typically less effective), and a new larger HT10 turbocharger aimed to improve output in the high-rpm region. An intercooler and an updated intake manifold were added, the latter having a much larger throttle body and improved fuel rail. The result was an increase in output to 110 PS (81 kW; 108 hp) from 85 PS (63 kW; 84 hp), and a much broader torque range. Other changes included a reduction of engine capacity from 988 cc to 930 cc; this strengthened the engine by increasing the bore wall thickness by 1 mm, and allowed cars using it to enter sub-1300 cc competition classes not otherwise possible due to conversion factors applied to forced induction engines.

The first prototypes were installed in the March Superturbo R/March R (EK10FR type) in 1988; shortly thereafter the engine was installed in the March Superturbo.

The MA09ERT was the first twincharged engine available in Japan; series charging combines the increased low-speed torque of supercharging with the increased high-speed torque and power of turbocharging. The presence of the supercharger also minimizes the effects of turbo lag.

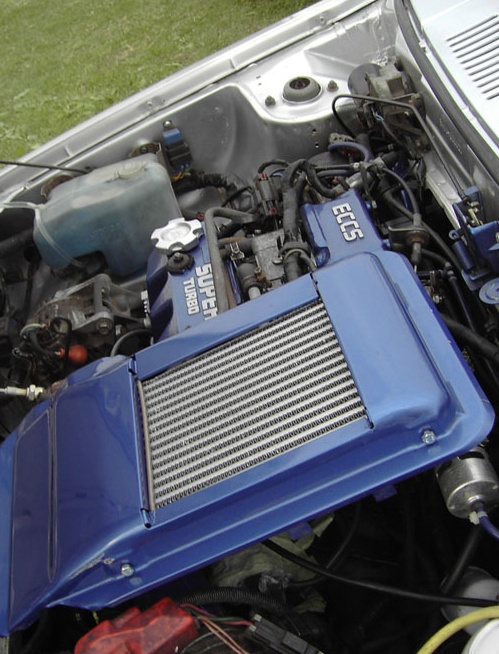
MA09ERT engine

=== Specifications ===
- Water-cooled inline-4, air-to-air intercooler
- Valve system: SOHC, 2 valves per cylinder
- Displacement: 0.9 L; 56.8 cu in (930 cc)
- Bore and stroke: 66 mm × 68 mm (2.60 in × 2.68 in)
- Maximum power: 110 PS (81 kW; 108 hp) at 6500 rpm
- Maximum torque: 13.3 kg⋅m (130 N⋅m; 96 lb⋅ft) at 5200 rpm
- Compression ratio: 7.7:1
- Weight: 111 kg (245 lb)
- Size (length × width × height): 705 mm × 575 mm × 680 mm (27.8 in × 22.6 in × 26.8 in)
- Specific fuel consumption (net): 255 g/(PS･h) at 1200 rpm

== MA10S ==
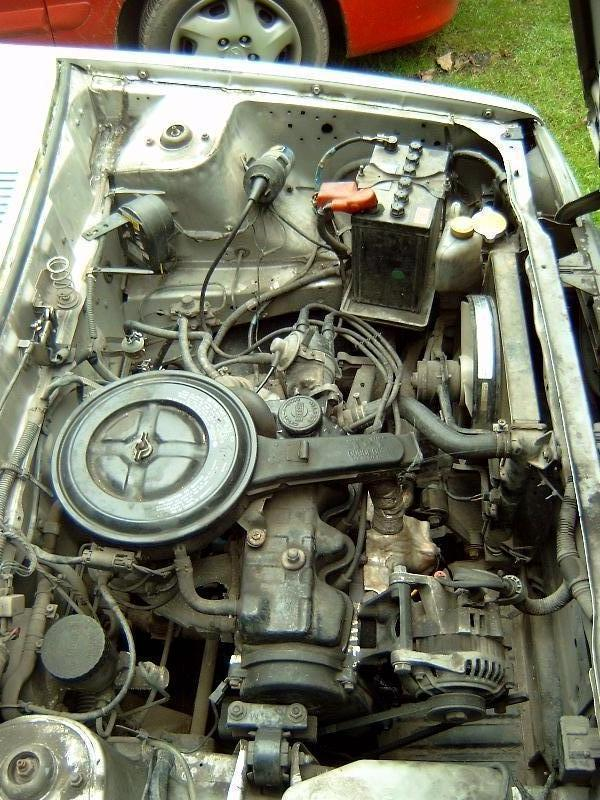
MA10S engine from a '90 Nissan Micra

The MA10S is an engine with an electronically controlled carburetor. It was used in the Be-1 and 1982–1992 Micra (K10) and Pao. It has a hemi-head and, unusually, the spark is fired after top dead centre because of the high flame speed in a compact engine with this head design. Compression in the 50 PS (37 kW) version was relatively low so that it was able to run on 90 RON petrol where available.

=== Specification ===
- Water-cooled inline-4
- Displacement: 988 cc (1.0 L; 60.3 cu in)
- Bore and stroke: 68 mm × 68 mm (2.68 in × 2.68 in)
- Compression ratio: 9.5:1
- Maximum power (net): 52 PS (38 kW; 51 hp) at 6000 rpm
- Maximum torque (net): 75 N⋅m (55 lb⋅ft) at 3600 rpm
- 1-bbl carburettor

== MA10E ==
The MA10E was used in the Nissan Saurus Jr.

- Displacement: 1.0 L (988 cc)
- Maximum power: 70 PS (51 kW; 69 hp) at 5600 rpm

== MA10ET ==
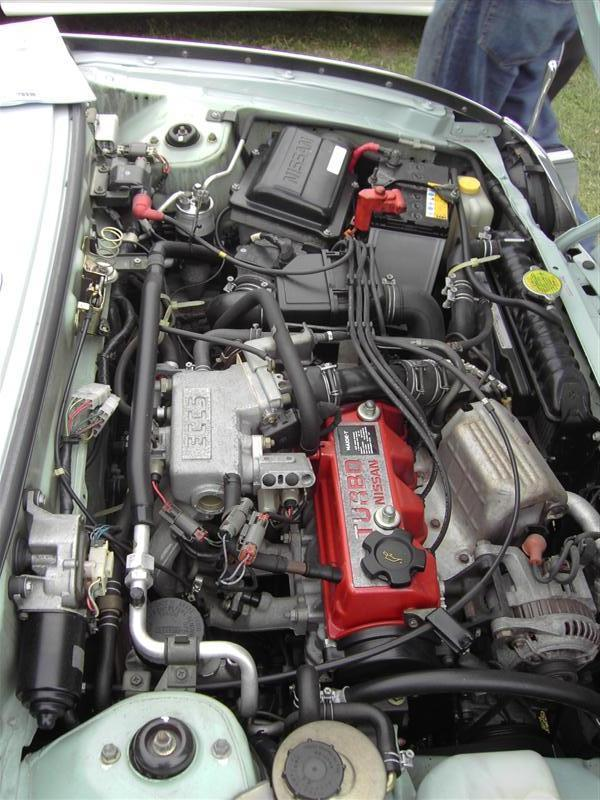
MA10ET engine

The Nissan MA10ET powered the Figaro and K10 March Turbo.

- Displacement: 988 cc (1.0 L; 60.3 cu in)
- Bore and stroke: 68 mm × 68 mm (2.68 in × 2.68 in)
- Maximum power: 76 PS (56 kW; 75 bhp) at 6000 rpm
- Maximum torque: 10.8 kg⋅m (106 N⋅m; 78 lb⋅ft) at 4400 rpm
- Compression ratio: 8.0:1
- Fuel supply device: Nissan Motor ECCS
- Power resource(V-AH): 12-30

== MA12S ==
The MA12S is the designation for the larger 1.2 L (1,235 cc) engine, featuring an enlarged bore as well as stroke. It was used in the Nissan Micra K10.

- Displacement: 1.2 L (1,235 cc)
- Bore and stroke: 71 mm × 78 mm (2.80 in × 3.07 in)
- Maximum power: 60 PS (44 kW; 59 hp) at 5600 rpm
- Maximum torque: 94 N⋅m (69 lb⋅ft) at 3600 rpm
- Compression ratio: 9.0:1

== See also ==
- List of Nissan engines
