= Ken Nomura =

Japanese drifting driver

- Nomuken in a comedy pose during a Pit Walk session, Silverstone Circuit, October 2005
- Nationality: Japan
- Born: May 9, 1965 (age 61) Fukuoka, Fukuoka Prefecture
- Retired: 2018
- Relatives: Keiichi Nomura (son)

D1 Grand Prix career
- Debut season: 2001
- Years active: 2002-2018
- Car number: 3
- Spotter: Naruhito Abe
- Former teams: BLITZ, DFellow, Pacific Racing Team
- Wins: 4
- Best finish: 2nd in 2006, 2008

Ken Nomura (Shinjitai: 野村謙, Nomura Ken; born Fukuoka, May 9, 1965) is a drifting driver from Japan. He made his debut in the D1 Grand Prix in the third round in 2001, driving the Blitz D1 Spec ER34 Skyline which he still drives. His nickname is Nomuken (のむけん) or Monkey Magic (as a reference to his company).

In his youth, Nomura was a baseball player and was very well known within his region, but his career never progressed any further through injury and turned to property developing. Once he gained his driving licence, he was dedicated to night-time street drag racing and then progressed to touge racing. In 1992, Nomuken was runner up in the "All Japan Ikaten" Finals and later in 1996 opened his own tuning shop Uras (reverse for saru, Japanese for monkey), producing drift specific products.

When he first joined the D1GP series in 2000, Nomura's performance was average, he had been away from drifting for some time before competing in its inaugural year. But as soon as he signed a contract with parts manufacturer Blitz as a works driver, his skills quickly developed.

In the D1 events, Nomura is known for his imitation of a monkey, as the pioneer of the smoke technique, he drifts with the most smoke. He is widely a fan favorite in the series. He also competes in the budget spinoff series, D1 Street Legal with a toned down version of his Skyline.

In 2006, Nomura won the D1GP Non Championship Event World All Star.

Nomura has also appeared for a TV commercial for his sponsor, Dunlop Tires in Japan, appears as a guest presenter in Video Option and Drift Tengoku as well as a columnist for the Option magazine and judges in drift events.

Nomura announced his intention to retire after the 2018 season on Twitter, and ran his last full-time race on Odaiba.

== Complete Drifting Results ==
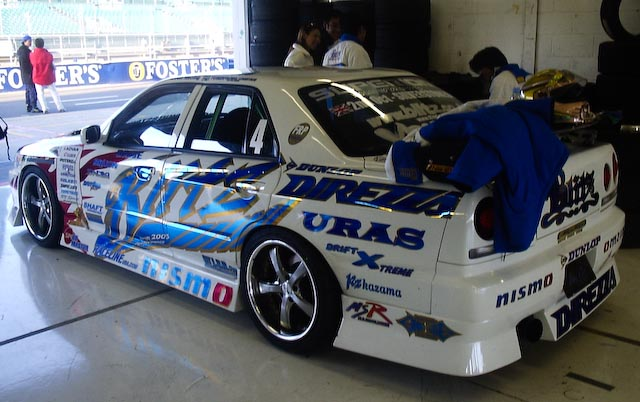
Nomuken's Blitz ER34 Skyline GT-T

| Colour | Result |
|---|---|
| Gold | Winner |
| Silver | 2nd place |
| Bronze | 3rd place |
| Green | Last 4 [Semi-final] |
| Blue | Last 8 [Quarter-final] |
| Purple | Last 16 (16) [1st Tsuiou Round OR Tandem Battle] (Numbers are given to indicate Top 10 finish) |
| Black | Disqualified (DSQ) (Given to indicate that the driver has been stripped of their position through disqualification) |
| White | First Round (TAN) [Tansou OR Qualifying Single Runs] |
| Red | Did not qualify (DNQ) |

- When driver's position are highlighted in blue, this indicates either the driver earned 100pt or 100pt tansou (solo run) bonus has been awarded, with the latter being in use for Pre-2005.

=== D1 Grand Prix ===
| Year | Entrant | Car | 1 | 2 | 3 | 4 | 5 | 6 | 7 | 8 | Position | Points |
|---|---|---|---|---|---|---|---|---|---|---|---|---|
| 2001 | | Nissan 180SX | EBS; DNQ | | | | | | | | | 0 |
| 2001 | Blitz | Nissan Skyline ER34 | | NIK | BHH; TAN | EBS; TAN | NIK | | | ⇨ | | 0 |
| 2002 | Blitz | Nissan Skyline ER34 | BHH; TAN | EBS; 6 | SGO; 3 | TKB; 10 | EBS; 10 | SEK; 6 | NIK; 2 | ⇨ | 3 | 58 |
| 2003 | Blitz | Nissan Skyline ER34 | TKB; 6 | BHH; 4 | SGO; 9 | FUJ; TAN | EBS; 8 | SEK; 6 | TKB; 16 | | 7 | 44 |
| 2004 | Blitz | Nissan Skyline ER34 | IRW; 3 | SGO; 3 | EBS; 1 | APS; 8 | ODB; 7 | EBS; 8 | TKB; 16 | ⇨ | 4 | 72 |
| 2005 | Blitz | Nissan Skyline ER34 | IRW; 8 | ODB; TAN | SGO; 2 | APS; 9 | EBS; 16 | FUJ; 4 | TKB; 8 | ⇨ | 6 | 49 |
| 2006 | Blitz | Nissan Skyline ER34 | IRW; 6 | SGO; 1 | FUJ; 10 | APS; 1 | EBS; 2 | SUZ; 2 | FUJ; 10 | IRW; 3 | 2 | 109 |
| 2007 | Blitz | Nissan Skyline ER34 | EBS; 6 | FUJ; 16 | SUZ; 7 | SGO; 6 | EBS; 1 | APS; 7 | FUJ; 11 | ⇨ | 5 | 57 |
| 2008 | Blitz | Nissan Skyline ER34 | EBS; 2 | FUJ; 8 | SUZ; 6 | OKY; 6 | APS; 2 | EBS; 15 | FUJ; 11 | ⇨ | 2 | 78 |
| 2009 | Blitz | Nissan Skyline ER34 | EBS; 1 | APS; 2 | OKY; 3 | OKY; 10 | EBS; 5 | EBS; 7 | FUJ; 7 | FUJ; 18 | 3 | 106 |
| 2010 | Blitz | Nissan Skyline ER34 | EBS; 7 | APS; 4 | OKY; 2 | OKY; 9 | EBS; 2 | EBS; 16 | FUJ; 6 | ⇨ | 4 | 90 |
| 2011 | BLITZ DFellow | Nissan Skyline ER34 | ODB; 7 | APS; 4 | SUZ; 11 | OKY; 10 | EBS; 8 | EBS; 12 | FUJ; 8 | ⇨ | 6 | 140 |
| 2012 | BLITZ Dfellow | Toyota GT86 ZN6 | ODB; 15 | SUZ; 16 | APS; Q-16 | EBS; Q-25 | EBS; Q-16 | CSC; 6 | ODB; 16 | ⇨ | 22 | 20 |
| 2013 | Blitz | Toyota GT86 ZN6 | MSI; Q-28 | SUZ; Q-30 | EBS; Q-22 | EBS; Q-23 | HBR; N | ODB; Q-31 | ⇨ | | - | - |
| 2014 | PACIFIC RACING TEAM with URAS | Toyota GT86 ZN6 | FUJ; Q-43 | SUZ; Q-25 | APS; R | EBS; N | EBS; N | ODB; N | ⇨ | | - | - |
| 2015 | PACIFIC RACING TEAM with URAS | Nissan Skyline ER34 | ODB; Pq-21 | SUZ; Q-36 | EBS; Q-39 | TKB; Q-24 | MSI; Q-43 | ODB; N | ⇨ | | - | - |
| 2016 | PACIFIC RACING TEAM with DUNLOP | Nissan Skyline ER34 | ODB; Q-27 | FUJ; 15 | TKB; Q-35 | TKB; 12 | EBS; 23 | EBS; Q-28 | ODB; N | ⇨ | 27 | 16 |
| 2017 | PACIFIC RACING TEAM DUNLOP | Nissan Skyline ER34 | ODB; 22 | ODB; Q-21 | TKB; Q-36 | MSI; Q-30 | EBS; Q-22 | EBS; 18 | ODB; N | ⇨ | 34 | 2 |
| 2018 | PACIFIC RACING TEAM DUNLOP | Nissan Skyline ER34 | MSI; 8 | MSI; 18 | APS; Q-20 | TOK; Q-18 | TKB; 15 | EBS; Q-23 | EBS; 23 | ODB; 17 | 24 | 23 |
