= Nissan S-Cargo =

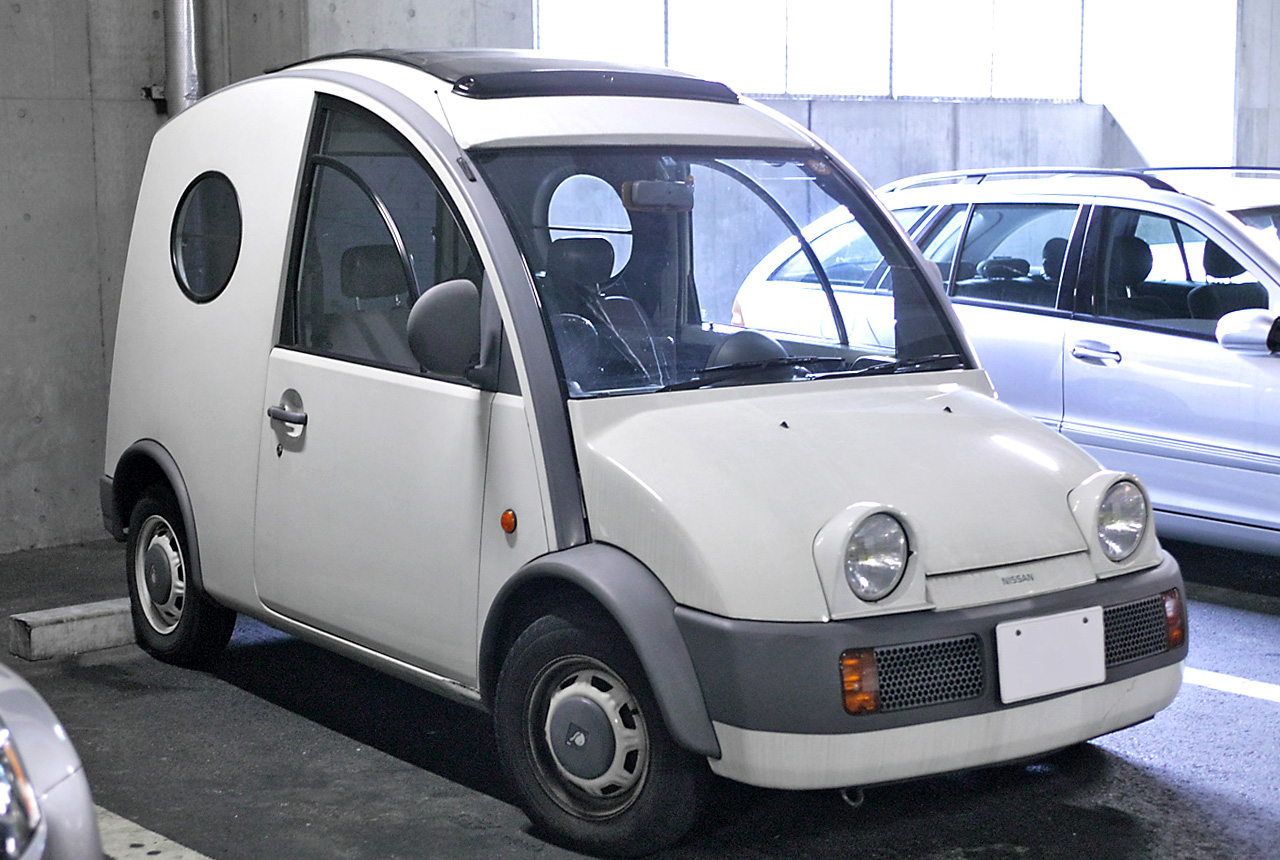
- A white Nissan S-Cargo, with canvas roof and quarter window

Overview
- Manufacturer: Nissan
- Model code: R-G20
- Production: 1989–1991; 10,685 produced
- Assembly: Japan: Oppama Plant, Yokosuka, Kanagawa
- Designer: Jim Shimizu

Body and chassis
- Class: Light commercial vehicle
- Body style: 2-/3-door van
- Layout: FF layout

Powertrain
- Engine: 1.5 L E15 I4
- Transmission: 3-speed automatic

Dimensions
- Wheelbase: 89 in (2,261 mm)
- Length: 137 in (3,480 mm)
- Width: 62.8 in (1,595 mm)
- Height: 72.4 in (1,839 mm)
- Curb weight: 2,097–2,141 lb (951–971 kg)

The Nissan S-Cargo is a small retro-styled van manufactured by the Japanese automaker Nissan from 1989 to 1991, and originally marketed solely in Japan at their Nissan Cherry Stores.

The exterior styling of the S-Cargo was inspired by the Citroën 2CV Fourgonnette delivery van, and interior styling borrowed a Citroën-style single-spoke steering wheel. The name was a double entendre, standing for "Small Cargo" and sounding like "escargot", the French word for snail, which in turn is a nickname for the Citroën 2CV.

The S-Cargo was introduced at the Tokyo Motor Show in 1989, was originally marketed without Nissan branding and was available by reservation only. Over its two-year production run, 10,685 were produced (variously reported as 12,000).

Because of its origins at Pike Factory, (Nissan's special project group), the S-Cargo—along with the Nissan Figaro, Be-1 and Pao—are known as Nissan's "Pike cars."

In 2011, noted design critic Phil Patton, writing for The New York Times, called the Pike cars "the height of postmodernism" and "unabashedly retro, promiscuously combining elements of the Citroën 2CV, Renault 4, Mini [and] Fiat 500."

== Specification ==
Optional items included:

- An oval-shaped portal window installed on each side panel of the van
- An electric canvas sunroof
