= Nissan Figaro =

Car model designed by Naoki Sakai and Shoji Takahashi

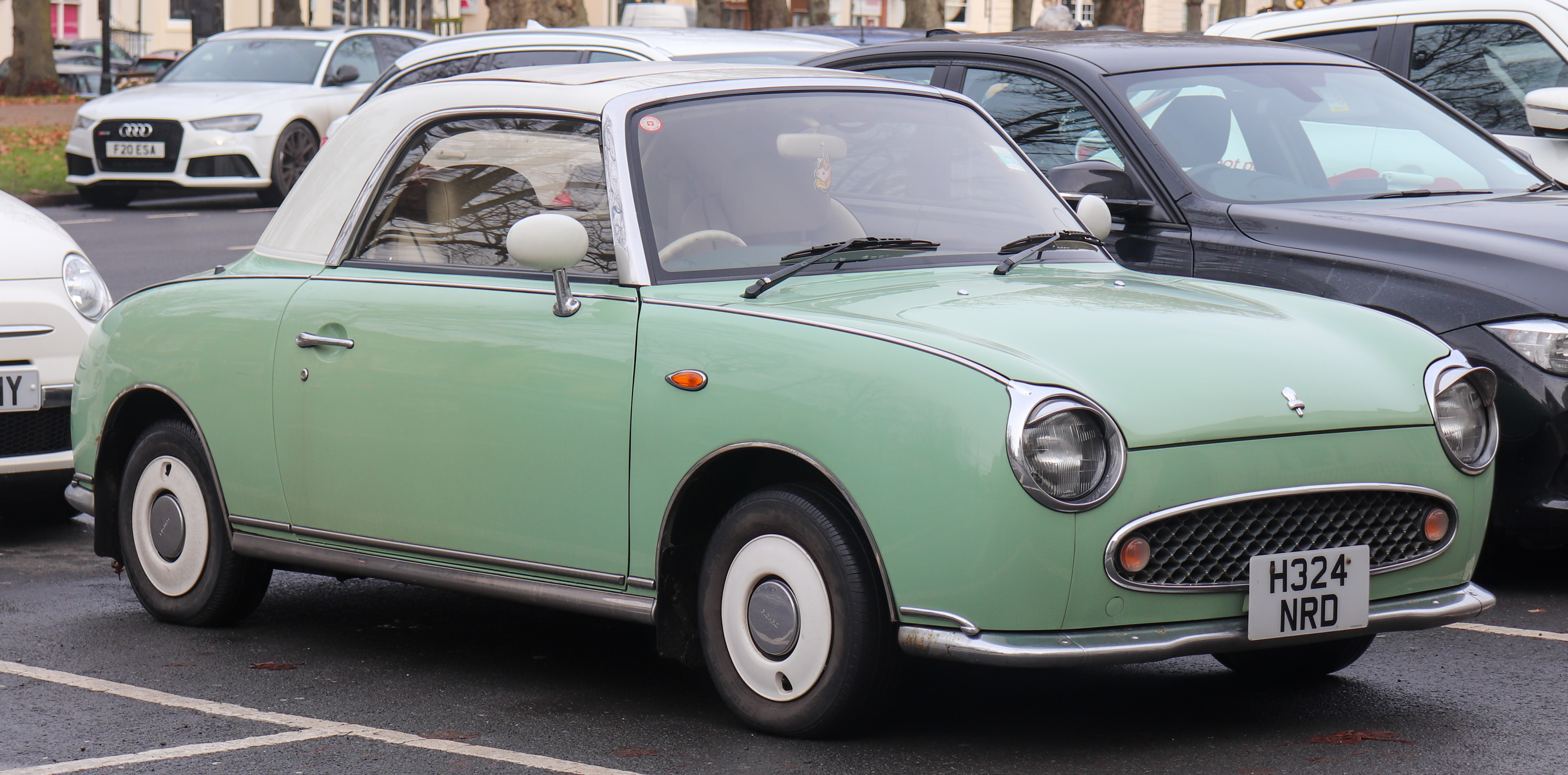
- Nissan Figaro finished in Emerald Green.

Overview
- Manufacturer: Nissan
- Model code: E-FK10
- Production: February 1991 – February 1992; 20,073 produced
- Assembly: Japan: Oppama Plant, Yokosuka, Kanagawa
- Designer: Naoki Sakai; Shoji Takahashi; Yoshio Kobata

Body and chassis
- Class: City car
- Body style: 2-door fixed-profile convertible
- Layout: FF layout
- Related: Nissan Be-1; Nissan Pao; Nissan S-Cargo; Nissan March

Powertrain
- Engine: 987 cc MA10ET turbo I4
- Transmission: 3-speed automatic

Dimensions
- Wheelbase: 2,300 mm (90.6 in)
- Length: 3,740 mm (147.2 in)
- Width: 1,630 mm (64.2 in)
- Height: 1,365 mm (53.7 in)
- Curb weight: 810 kg (1,786 lb)

The Nissan Figaro is a two-door car manufactured by Nissan in February 1991 for the Japanese market. Based on the original Nissan March/Micra, the Figaro is a fixed-profile convertible with a 2+2 seating arrangement. It shares the March's front-engine, front-wheel-drive layout. When new, it was sold only through Nissan Cherry Stores.

A total of 20,073 Figaros were produced by Nissan in the convertible's single year of series production, all with right-hand drive; As of 2019, at least 3,000 Figaros have been grey imported to Great Britain and Ireland. There are a few examples of left-hand drive conversions for countries that have right-hand traffic. Furthermore, their popularity has increased even more since they are now recognized as classic cars under the 25-year rule, making them eligible for import into the United States, sale to private users.

Because of its origins at Pike Factory, Nissan's special project group, the Figaro (along with the Nissan Pao, Be-1, and S-Cargo) is one of Nissan's "Pike cars," and represented a design strategy that adapted "design and marketing strategies from other industries like personal electronics".

In 2011, design critic Phil Patton, writing for the New York Times, called the Pike cars "the height of postmodernism" and "unabashedly retro, promiscuously combining elements of the Citroën 2CV, Renault 4, Mini, and Fiat 500".

== Design ==
Nissan introduced the Figaro at the 1989 Tokyo Motor Show, using "Back to the Future" as its marketing tagline. Based on the first-generation Nissan March, the Figaro was manufactured at Aichi Machine Industry, a special projects group that Nissan would later call "Pike Factory", which also produced three other niche vehicles: the Be-1, Pao, and S-Cargo. Aichi had originally built independent kei cars like the Cony 360 until Nissan assumed operations in 1966, and was also the original manufacturing location for the first generation Nissan Sunny.

Like the Be-1, the Figaro shared its platform with the first-generation March. It was equipped with an OHC turbo engine borrowed from the March Turbo. This was to compensate for the weight increase caused by the addition of the canvas top opening and closing mechanism.

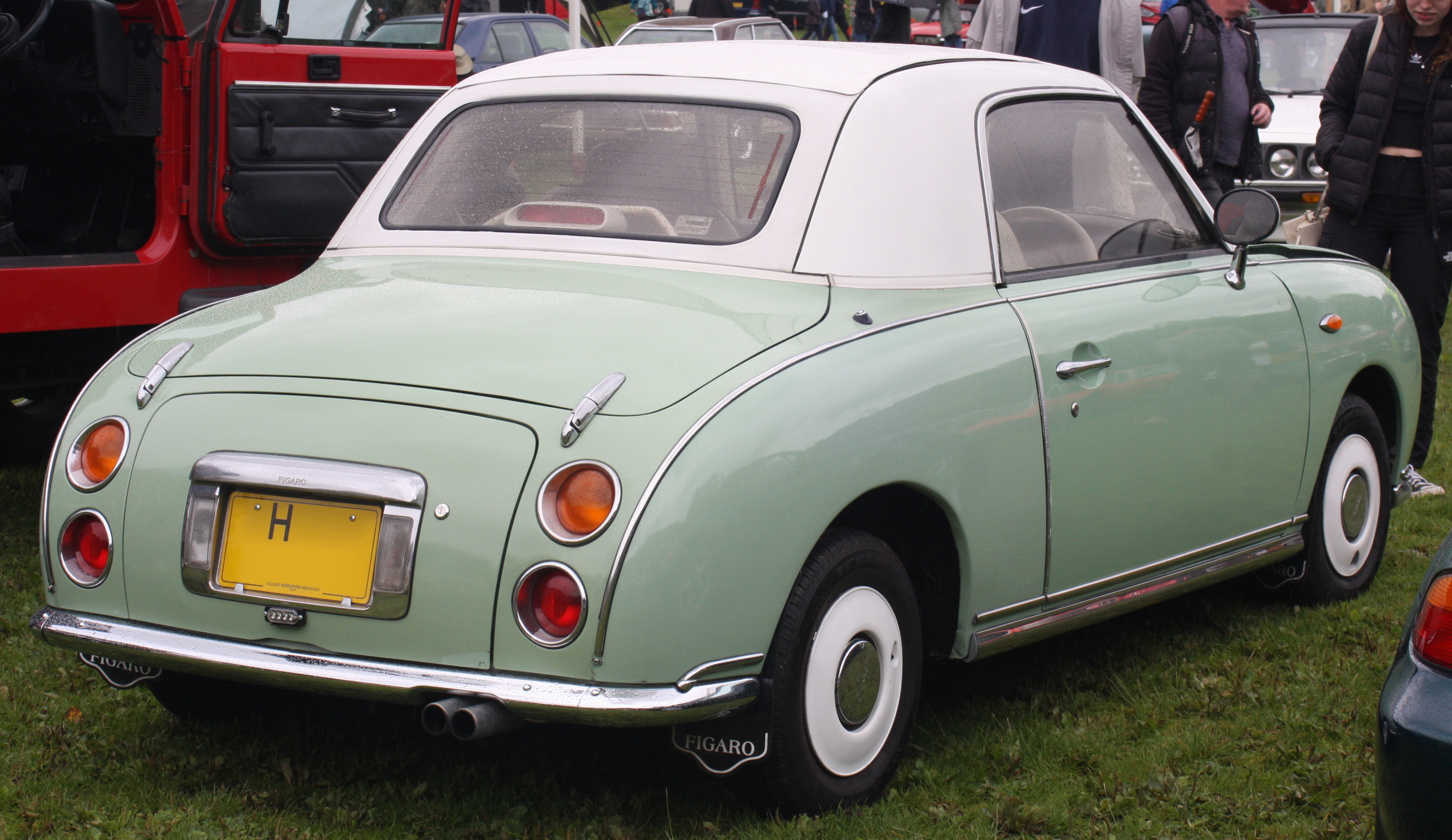
Nissan Figaro finished in Emerald Green (spring)

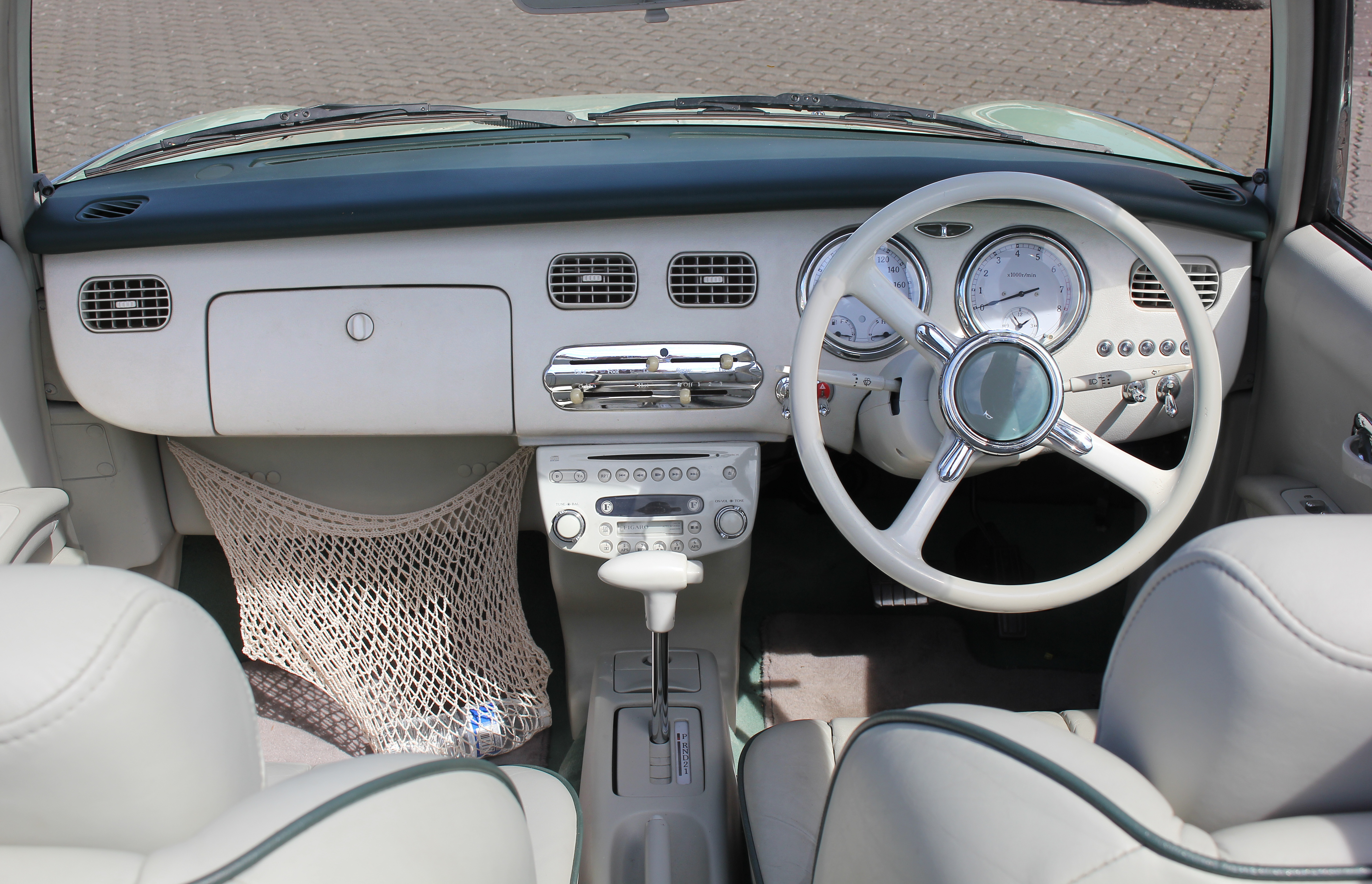
Nissan Figaro interior

Based on the Nissan March (Micra) platform, the Figaro uses a 1.0-liter (987 cc) turbocharged engine generating 76 PS (56 kW; 75 hp) and 78 lb⋅ft (106 N⋅m) of torque through a three-speed automatic transmission, front MacPherson struts, rear four-link coil spring suspension, rack and pinion steering, and front ventilated disc and rear drum brakes. The Figaro can reach a top speed of 106 mph (171 km/h). It also featured front fenders made from thermoplastic resin to reduce weight.

The Figaro features a retro style design on both the interior and exterior, taking inspiration from cars of the 1950s such as the Renault Dauphine, as well as from elements of 1930s Art Deco design. Notable retro exterior design elements include the round headlights and taillights, chrome trim, fixed-profile convertible body style, and wheels designed to mimic whitewall tires.

Standard equipment on the interior included ivory leather seats with contrasting piping, air conditioning, CD player, cassette tape player, chrome and Bakelite-style knobs, soft-feel paint on the dashboard top, chrome-trimmed speedometer with smaller inset gauges for fuel and engine temperature, and chrome-trimmed tachometer with inset clock.

As a fixed-profile convertible, the upper side elements of the Figaro's bodywork remain fixed while its fabric soft top retracts in conjunction with a solid panel with a defroster-equipped glass rear window—as seen in other fixed-profile convertibles, including the original 1957 Fiat 500 and the Citroën 2CV.

Exterior paint colors represented the four seasons: Topaz Mist (autumn), Emerald Green (spring), Pale Aqua (summer) and Lapis Grey (winter). The interior is predominantly white, with accents in the same color as the body.

At first, 8,000 Figaros were manufactured, and then an additional 12,000 to meet demand. Prospective purchasers entered a lottery to acquire a Figaro. Limited edition cars came with passenger side baskets and cup holders.
