= Nissan Be-1 =

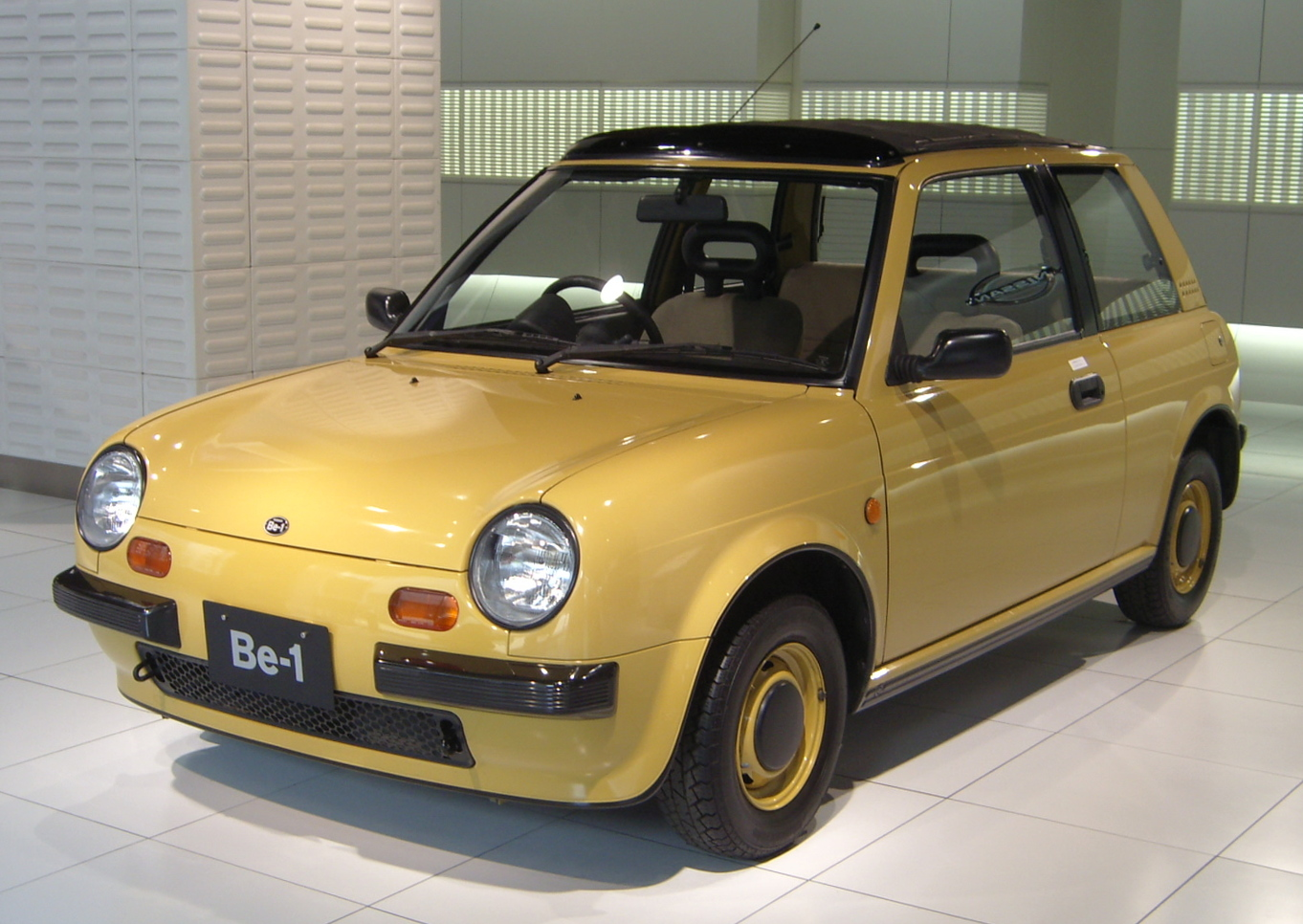
- Nissan Be-1 finished in Pumpkin Yellow

Overview
- Manufacturer: Nissan Motors
- Model code: E-BK10
- Production: 1987–1988; 10,000 produced
- Assembly: Japan: Totsuka, Kanagawa (Takada Kogyo)
- Designer: Yoshiro Kobata; Naoki Sakai

Body and chassis
- Body style: 2-door sedan
- Layout: FF layout
- Related: Nissan Pao; Nissan Figaro; Nissan March

Powertrain
- Engine: 1.0 L MA10S I4
- Transmission: 3-speed automatic; 5-speed manual

Dimensions
- Wheelbase: 2,300 mm (90.6 in)
- Length: 3,635 mm (143.1 in)
- Width: 1,580 mm (62.2 in)
- Height: 1,395 mm (54.9 in) (hardtop); 1,420 mm (55.9 in) (canvas top)
- Curb weight: 670–710 kg (1,477–1,565 lb)

The Nissan Be-1 is a retro-styled two-door notchback sedan manufactured by Nissan in 1987 and 1988, and marketed solely in Japan at their Nissan Cherry Stores.

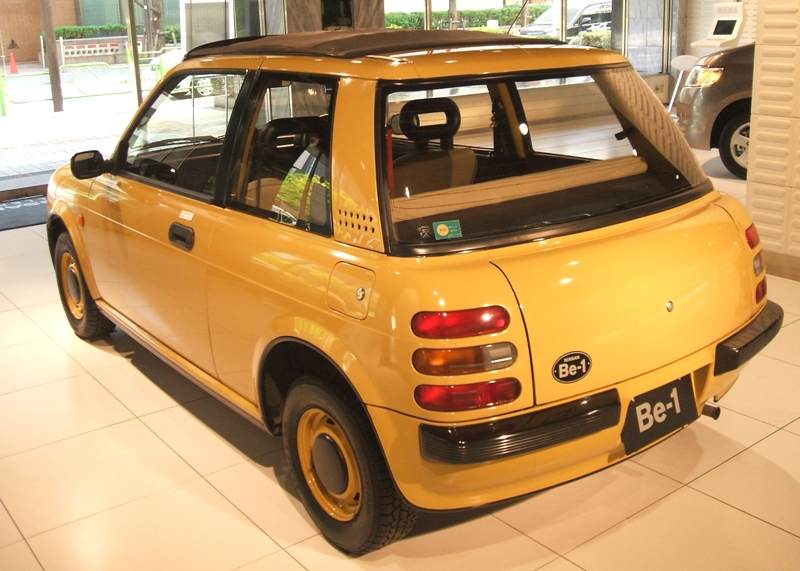
Nissan Be-1 finished in Pumpkin Yellow (rear)

Designed to be a fashionable city car, the Be-1 was marketed without any Nissan branding, by reservation only, and solely in Japan. Nissan's own design team made a design proposal (A), while industrial designer Naoki Sakai and an unnamed Italian design studio also provided proposals (B1 and B2). Sakai's B1 design was chosen, and with it, the name as well.

Because of its origins at the Pike Factory, Nissan's special project group, the Be-1—along with the Nissan Figaro, Pao and S-Cargo—are known as Nissan's "Pike cars." It, the Pao, and the Figaro are built on the Nissan March's underpinnings.

In 2011, noted design critic Phil Patton, writing for the New York Times, called the Pike cars "the height of postmodernism" and "unabashedly retro, promiscuously combining elements of the Citroën 2CV, Renault 4, Mini [and] Fiat 500."

== Specifications ==
Like the later Pao and Figaro, the Be-1 is based on the first generation Nissan Micra chassis. As such, it is powered by the 1.0 L (987 cc) carbureted MA10S I4 engine coupled to a choice of a 3-speed automatic or 5-speed manual transmission. This engine produces 52 PS (38 kW; 51 hp) at 6000 rpm and 75 N⋅m (55 lb⋅ft) of torque at 3600 rpm.

The chassis included rack and pinion steering, independent suspension with struts in front, as well as 4-links and coil springs in back. Disc brakes were used in the front and drum brakes were used in the rear. A large, electronically operated canvas roof was offered as an option starting in March, 1987. The interior is very basic, with seating for five, and notably features a large, centrally mounted speedometer. Like the original Mini, the Be-1 has a small bootlid (although it opens upwards) and a fixed rear window and is thus a two-door sedan. Nissan themselves has sometimes classified the car as a "coupé".

== Production ==
10,000 Be-1s were built in total from 1987 to 1988, but since demand was so high for the Be-1, buyers were decided through a lottery organized by Nissan. The cars were assembled, partially by hand, by contract manufacturers Takada Kogyo. Takada later also built the Pao and Figaro, as well as some small-series Isuzu and Subaru products.

The Be-1 was available in four colors: Pumpkin Yellow, Tomato Red, Hydrangea Blue and Onion White. The Pumpkin Yellow Be-1 came with body-colored steel wheels with black hubcaps; the other colors came with white steel wheels with black hubcaps.

Model codes

- BK10RHF (5MT)
- BK10RHFW (5MT w/canvas top)
- BK10RHA (3AT)
- BK10RHAW (3AT w/canvas top)

Dimensions and weight

- Ground clearance: 165 mm (6.5 in)
- Front tread: 1,365 mm (53.7 in)
- Rear tread: 1,350 mm (53.1 in)
- Weight: MT 670 kg, (w/canvas top 680 kg), AT 700 (w/canvas top 710 kg)
- Gross weight: MT 945 kg (w/canvas top 955 kg), AT 975 kg (w/canvas top 985 kg)

Performance

- Minimum turning radius: 4.4 m (14 ft)
- Fuel consumption (according to Japanese rule 10.15): (5MT) 20.5 km/L (48.2 mpg); (3AT) 16.5 km/L (38.8 mpg); (3AT w/canvas top) 15.0 km/L (35.3 mpg)
- Fuel consumption at a steady 60 km/h (37 mph): (5MT) 31.4 km/L (73.9 mpg); (3AT) 25.4 km/L (59.7 mpg)

Other

- Fuel tank capacity: unleaded regular, 40 L (10.6 US gal)
- Tire size: 165/70R12 front and rear
