= Drift Tengoku =

Japanese automobile magazine

- Chief Editor: Ryusuke Kawasaki
- Categories: automobiles, do it yourself
- Frequency: Monthly
- Publisher: San-Ei Shobo Publishing
- First issue: April 1996
- Final issue: February 2024
- Country: Japan
- Language: Japanese
- Website: jdm-option.com
- OCLC: 852481808

Drift Tengoku (ドリフト天国, Dorifuto Tengoku, Drift Paradise/Drift Heaven) was a monthly automobile magazine dedicated to drifting and was the first of its kind. Published by San-Ei Shobo Publishing in both print and video format, it is the sister publication to Option, Option2 and Video Option. Until 2007, when rival magazine D to D was published, it was the only magazine dedicated to the art of driving sideways.

Drift Tengoku has stopped being produced after its final issue in February 2024.

== History ==
Drift Tengoku was launched in April 1996 as part of Option2. At that time, printed quarterly, it mainly published drifting related articles such as tuning as well as covering drifting contests, it also covered illegal gatherings that took place on public road, especially at the touge. These features usually led to police visits to the magazine's office.

The magazine featured many of the now notable drifting drivers such as Ken Nomura and Nobuteru Taniguchi. At the following year, the magazine went bimonthly and the year following that, it went monthly. It was not until February 1999 that the magazine was published as a standalone magazine. The magazine celebrated its 100th issue in September 2007. The video version is different from the print as it solely covers drifting events run by the magazine.
