= Phil Patton =

American writer (1952–2015)

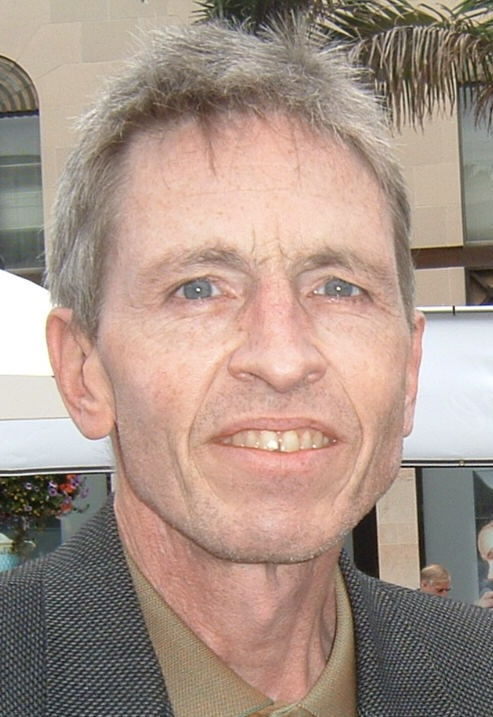
- Patton in 2004
- Born: Lewis Foster Patton; March 23, 1952; Durham, North Carolina, U.S.
- Died: September 22, 2015 (aged 63); Wayne, New Jersey, U.S.
- Occupations: Author, journalist, critic, teacher, freelance writer
- Spouse(s): Joelle Delbourgo (m. 1976, d. 1996) Kathleen Hamilton (m. 2007)
- Writing career
- Genres: History, Culture, Technology, Design and Automotive journalism
- Website: philpatton.com

Phil Patton (born Lewis Foster Patton; March 23, 1952 – September 22, 2015) was an American freelance journalist, book author, teacher, editor, and design and curatorial consultant, widely known for his sense of curiosity and his focus on design, technology, culture, history — and, extensively, automotive subjects.

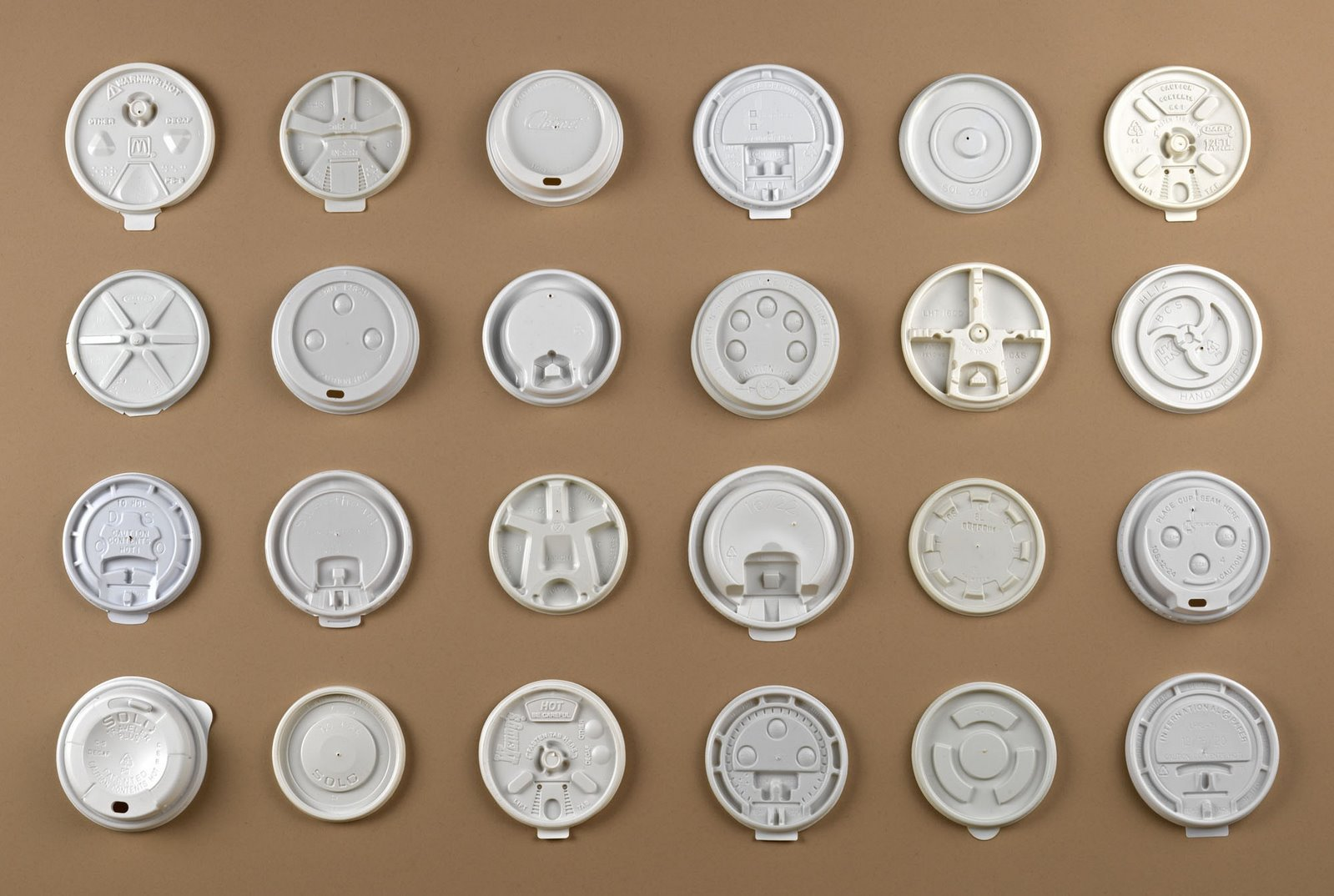
Phil Patton's coffee cup lid collection, as exhibited at the Cincinnati Museum of Art

Phil Patton, excerpts

- From his article, Agents of Change, American Heritage, 1994:

"For want of nails, kingdoms are won and lost. We all know that. The shoe slips, the horse stumbles, the army dissolves in retreat. But who designed the nails? Who hammered the nails? Who invented the nail-making machinery? Who figured out how to market the nails in neat plastic blister packs hung from standardized wire racks in hardware stores? The house of history, that clever balloon frame of statistics and biographies in which we shelter our sense of tradition, of progress, of values gained and lost, is nailed together with anonymity. Too often we look at history instead as a half-timbered castellated structure, focusing on the carved keystones above the doors bearing the faces of Napoleon or Lincoln, Voltaire or Descartes, Michelangelo or Machiavelli. History tends to neglect the nails, the nuts and bolts of daily life."

- From the New York Times: Writing in depth on the development of new automotive paints, from his article, Harvest Season for the '08 Car Colors, 2008:

"And disruptive events occur in the process, like the arrival a few years ago of Xirallic pigments from the automotive coatings division of Merck, the drug giant. Developed in Japan, the pigments are made with aluminum particles coated with titanium oxide. The result is paint with a crystalline glitter and a sparkling effect of depth. The new pigments provide pearl effects, "just a slight highlight shift." They are a kind of sophisticated version of candy apple."

- From Fortune Magazine: In 2013, Patton described the front end of the forthcoming Jeep Cherokee as "protoplasmic: a paramecium of daytime running lamps and an amoeba of a headlight," adding: "A broad lower grille evokes the tiger mouth of recent Kias."

Described as a design guru, Patton's reportage and essays were regularly carried by a host of news outlets, magazines and online media, from Wired and Esquire to I.D. magazine. He served as commentator on PBS, the History Channel, NBC Today, CBS Sunday Morning, and The Charlie Rose Show. He authored books on subjects ranging from the American highway system to the inter-relationship of television and professional football — and co-authored a book on everyday objects with the design team of star-architect Michael Graves. He taught design classes at numerous schools, including at New York's School of Visual Arts, urging his students "to look".

Patton was known for parsing the details of a seemingly insignificant design element and then extrapolating its relationship to humanity at large, identifying what the New York Times called the "deeper cultural messages". In 1996, he authored an essay on polystyrene coffee lids, detailing "how intensely designed they were" and noting how the lids reveal the "whole vast machinery of modern culture". For Car and Driver, he wrote In Praise of Knobs, examining the nature of touch as a human sense, the nature of microscopic nerve behaviors, and the science of haptic feedback — learning that Audi's haptics engineers in Ingolstadt studied the sound of their dashboard switches to develop "the Audi Click". For the New York Times, he wrote about Prada's 2012 Spring/Summer 2012 collection, with shoes featuring distinctly automotive tailfins.

Writing for the Los Angeles Times, automotive journalist Dan Neil called Patton's 2004 book, Bug: The Strange Mutations of the World's Most Famous Automobile, "effortlessly smart and entertaining", in an industry of "authors who can take the lively subject of the automobile and inject it with Thorazine." Noted graphic designer and writer, Roger Black, said Patton "taught the New York Times to cover design. The domino effect: the rest of the media followed." Writing for the Cooper Hewitt, Smithsonian Design Museum, Molly F. Heintz said "from a single object, [Patton] could unfold a universe."

== Background ==
Lewis Foster Patton was born in Durham, North Carolina, and was given his life-long nickname, Phil, after the airman who saved his father's life in World War II. He was the son of Lewis Weimar Patton (1924–1998), an Air Force bombardier in the US Army Air Corps and Purple Heart recipient, severely injured in a bombing raid over Japan, and Mildred Wilson (née Dwyer) Patton (1914–1985), a bibliophile who passed her love of books to her son, and in whose honor the Mildred Dwyer Patton Award was presented annually by the Raleigh Fine Arts Society. He had one brother, David Burton Patton (1956–1999).

Having grown up at an airbase in Florida and in North Carolina, Patton graduated from Needham B. Broughton High School in Raleigh in 1970, later attending Harvard University where he was an arts editor of The Harvard Crimson, graduating in 1974 with a degree in English and history. He moved to New York City, graduated from Columbia University with a master's degree in comparative literature, and briefly worked as a fact-checker for Esquire and as editor of Sky Magazine, the now defunct in-flight magazine of Delta Air Lines.

A member of the International Motor Press Association (IMPA), an Overall Best Story writing award was presented annually in Patton's honor by the Raleigh Fine Arts Society. An extensive collector, he curated a personal assemblage of antique cameras including Kodak Brownies and Polaroids. As a professional writer, he favored an Olympus SLR. Recognizing his seminal I.D. magazine article on the design of coffee cup lids, the Cincinnati Art Museum featured his collection of the lids in an exhibit entitled Caution: Contents Hot (2007).

Patton and his first wife, Joelle Delbourgo, had two children, Caroline and Andrew. He lived in Montclair and Woodland Park, New Jersey, for most of his career. His second wife was Kathleen Hamilton, a former editor with Automobile Magazine and Automotive News.

Patton died in September, 2015 at age 63 of pneumonia, as a complication of emphysema.

== Career ==
=== As freelance journalist ===
The New York Times carried Patton's reportage as well as his humor writing, found in articles published over decades. He created the "Public Eye" design column and contributed to "Design Notebook", "Automobiles", "Wheels", "Style", "New York Times Magazine" and other sections. As a contributing editor for Esquire, he authored "Design" and "Living Quarters" columns. He was a regular reviewer for Artforum and a contributing editor for Wired, Departures and I.D. magazine,

Patton's freelance work was published across diverse publications including American Heritage, Architectural Digest, Art in America, ARTnews, AutoWeek, Automobile, Car and Driver, Condé Nast Traveler, Connoisseur, Core 77, Design Applause, Design Observer, Dwell, Esquire Japan, Geo, Harper's Bazaar, Inc., Interiors, Manhattan, Men's Journal, Metropolis, The New Republic, New York, Omni, Seven Days, Smithsonian, Travel + Leisure, Vogue, The Washington Post Book World and The Village Voice.

=== As book author ===
Patton authored or contributed to more than 30 books and exhibit catalogs, most notably:

- Razzle Dazzle: The Curious Marriage of Television and Professional Football, The Dial Press, 1984
- Open Road: A Celebration of the American Highway, Simon & Schuster, 1986
- Voyager by Jeana Yeager and Dick Rutan with Phil Patton, Knopf, 1987
- Made in U.S.A.: The Secret Histories of the Things That Made America, Grove Press, 1992
- Bill Traylor: High Singing Blue, Carl Hammer Gallery, 1997
- Dreamland: Travels Inside the Secret World of Roswell and Area 51, Villard (Random House), 1998
- Bug: The Strange Mutations of the World's Most Famous Automobile, Simon & Schuster, 2002
- Michael Graves Designs: The Art of the Everyday Object, by Phil Patton with Michael Graves Design Group, Melcher Media, 2004
- Cars, Culture, and the City, by Donald Albrecht, Phil Patton, Museum of the City of New York in conjunction with its 2010 exhibit of the same name.
- Autodesign International: Marken, Modelle und ihre Macher (Autodesign International: Cars, Brands and Their Creators), by Bernd Polster and Phil Patton, DuMont Buchverlag GmbH, 2010 (Germany)
- Top This and Other Parables of Design: Selected Writings by Phil Patton, 40 excerpts of his writing chosen by friends in the design world, Cooper Hewitt Smithsonian Design Museum, 2016

=== As educator ===
Patton was among the earliest faculty members of New York's School of Visual Arts Design Criticism program, where his coffee cup lids and literary collection is archived.

=== As speaker ===
A frequent speaker at museums and design conferences, Patton often served as nominator and juror for programs including the Chrysler Design Award and EyesOn Design. He spoke and presented at the International Design Conference in Aspen; the Industrial Designers Society of America International Conference; ACD Living Surfaces; Knoll Cranbrook Design Conferences; San Francisco Museum of Modern Art; Wolfsonian-FIU museum in Miami; Columbia Graduate School of Architecture, Planning and Preservation.

He was a regular commentator on CBS News and helped develop and appeared on a number of television series, notably Divided Highways, on the Interstate highway system (PBS); The Autobahn (History Channel, 2000).

=== Other ===
Patton wrote catalogs and essays for exhibitions at museums around the United States, including Surrounding Interiors: Views Inside the Car at the Davis Museum and Cultural Center of Wellesley College as well as at the Frederick R. Weisman Art Museum at the University of Minnesota in Minneapolis, Minnesota (2002–2003); Glamour: Fashion, Industrial Design, Architecture at the San Francisco Museum of Modern Art (2004); SAFE: Design Takes On Risk at the Museum of Modern Art (2005); Curves of Steel: Streamlined Automobile Design at the Phoenix Art Museum (2007); and On the Job: Design and the American Office at the National Building Museum in Washington, D.C. (2018).

He served as editorial consultant for The Art of the Motorcycle at the Solomon R. Guggeheim Museum (1998); curatorial consultant for Different Roads: Automobiles for the Next Century at the Museum of Modern Art (1999); and consultant for Blobjects and Beyond: The New Fluidity in Design at the San Jose Museum of Art (2005).
