= Option (car magazine) =

Japanese automotive magazine

- A typical Option cover
- Categories: Automobile
- Frequency: monthly
- Publisher: San-Ei Shobo Publishing
- Founded: 1981
- Country: Japan
- Based in: Shinjuku-ku, Tokyo
- Language: Japanese
- Website: Official Site

Option (オプション, Opushon in katakana and subtitled Exciting Car Magazine) is an automotive magazine founded by Daijiro Inada in 1981, to meet the demand for enthusiasts of modified Japanese cars in Japan.

The magazine is published by the Japanese media giant San-Ei Shobo Publishing, the parent company of Sunpros, a company owned by Inada, who is behind both the D1 Grand Prix series and Tokyo Auto Salon.

== Description ==
During the earlier days, the magazines used to cover illegal street races held in expressways before it became illegal to do so. Also, it covers the exploits of Inada attempts at driving speed records, whether it was at Bonneville, at the German Autobahn or at the Silver State Classic, even by members of the magazine editorial team. Nowadays the series features Wangan competitions on closed roads and where it is legalised to do so.

Beside speed tests and modified car features, other regular features includes, a rate-my-car feature where readers send a photo of their car to be judged by Manabu Suzuki, with a comedic result; a monthly features, where Keiichi Tsuchiya solves readers' problems that concern with drifting, a monthly column called Sugoiyo Osaru-san (すごいよ！ オサルさん) by Ken Nomura. Also it has a D1GP mini-magazine. Other contributors includes Eiji Yamada and Manabu Orido. The magazine also covered the buildup to his Silver State exploits that he has become known for. Other magazines in the Option line are Option 2, a similar magazine but less emphasises on feature cars but more on technical bits and DIY modifications; Option Wagon for modified MPV, Drift Tengoku, a magazine and video series dedicated to drifting and Video Option. The Option magazine is known to be very popular amongst JDM enthusiasts and people who work in the Import industry who use it to gain knowledge on new parts.

Option also sponsors the HKS Premium Day's Option Fuji Super Lap, a major time attack competition for tuned cars held at Fuji Speedway.

== Project cars ==
- StreamZ (ver.1) (ストリームZ in Katakana ) — After one failed attempt to compete in the Silver State Classic held at Ely, Nevada in 1999 driving a Blitz modified R34 Skyline GT-R, Inada decided to return in 2003 for an attempt at the overall record which had been recorded into the Guinness Book of Records by a stock car based Chrysler LeBaron. The Stream Z was a Nissan Fairlady Z33 built to compete in the Unlimited category unlike the R34 which had been competing in the 190 mph (310 km/h) average category and is modified by tuner, JUN Auto. Its VQ35DE engine was enlarged to 3.8 liters and equipped with a Garrett T88-34D turbocharger giving out a total horsepower of 800. During the race, the rear left tire delaminated but did not lose air at 240 km/h; however, when attempting to slow down by dropping into 3rd gear at 240 km/h, the car left the road and rolled over seven times. Inada managed to survive without serious injuries but was to be taken to the nearby hospital. The accident had never been officially investigated, but the in-car camera video was reviewed and it is speculated that a last-minute incorrect rear-end alignment caused the tire to overheat and delaminate, and driver error caused the crash. The wrecked car was shipped back to Japan and, in January the following year at the Tokyo Auto Salon, was displayed at the magazine’s stand and became one of the show’s attractions that year, attracting more people than many of the show cars displayed.

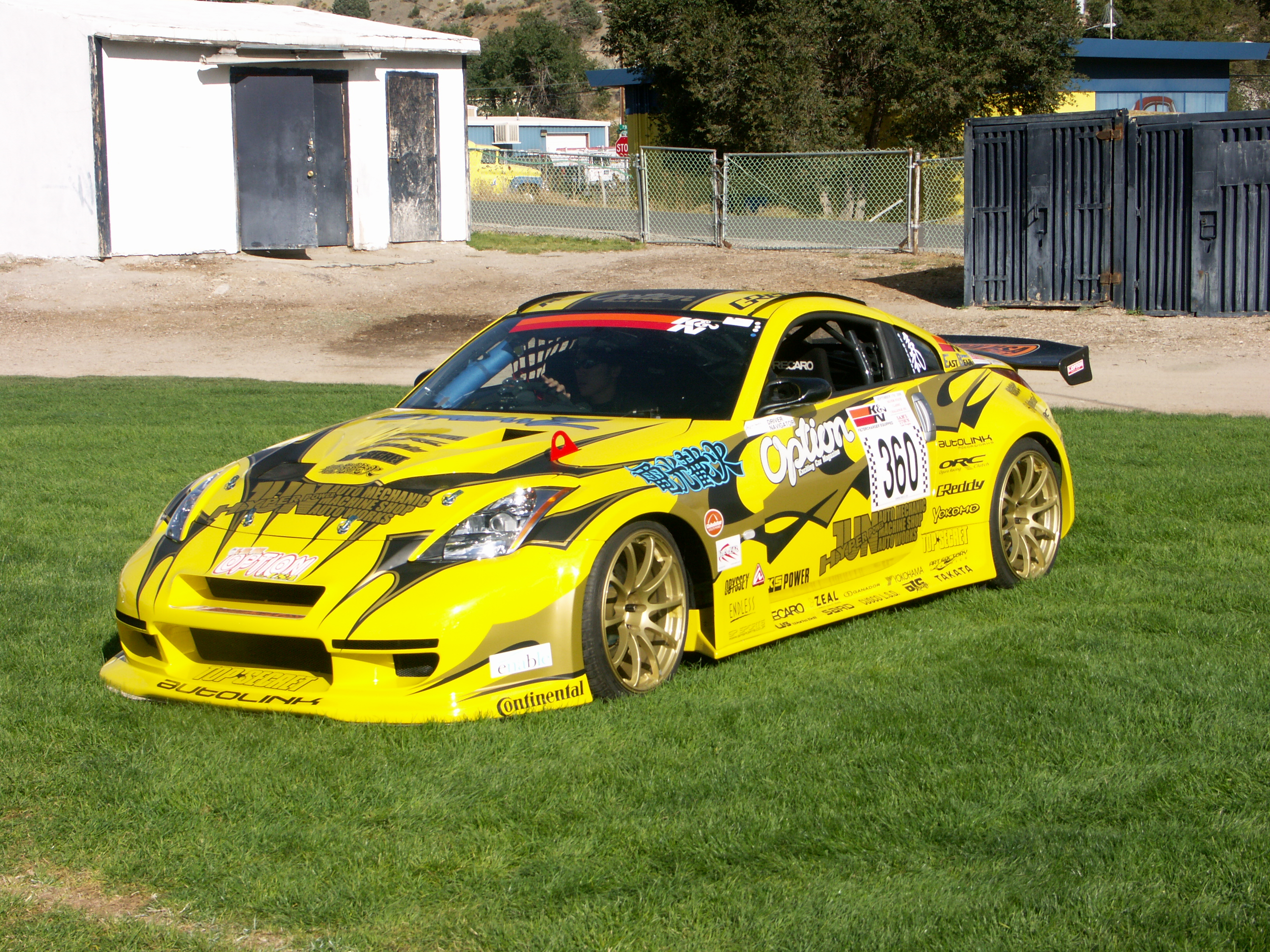
Option Stream Z, Silver State Classic 2006

- Stream Z (ver.2) — After the show ended, the magazine and Dai decided on another attempt at the race, this time they took on another Z33 as a donor car but now with a wide arch kit to allow for wider tires. Whatever was intact in the old car had now been transferred into the newer car including the 3.8 litre engine. Now with the T88-38GK turbocharger giving out 100 extra horsepower to the previous car and for extra safety measures came equipped with a drag chute in the event of a tire failure. The Option crew also hired a helicopter to watch over the car in any event of incident but managed to finish third place overall without incident.

For the following year, the car was modified at the rear suspension allowing the rear camber to be altered. Unfortunately in 2005, on the day before the race, during a 1-mile (1.6 km) speed run, Inada drove the car off course after not noticing the finishing line (which was a set of cones), misreading co driver Susumu Koyama's (owner of tuner, JUN Auto) signal to slow down, and failing to slow down before a corner 2 km after the finishing line, causing mechanical damages to the car and putting the co-driver in hospital for whiplash injuries. As a result they were forced to miss out on the main race, but he was the winner of the 1-mile (1.6 km) shootout race that caused such misfortune for him.

During and his attempt at the Nevada Open Road Challenge in May 2006 which he retired with a broken crank pulley after 57 km, Inada announced his retirement and the following event would become his last race. During that September, during a 1-mile (1.6 km) run a day prior to the main race, he blew his engine.

Both the magazine's project cars have made appearances in video games, its earlier project car, Option Speed Wagon have appeared in the 1998 Konami arcade game Racing Jam as a hidden car and the infamous Option Stream Z have appeared in both installments of the D1 Grand Prix game by Yuke's and the ver.2 in Gran Turismo 4 all as bonus cars.

== See also ==
- Import scene
- Japan domestic market
- Video Option
