= Video Option =

Direct-to-video magazine version of the Option magazine

Video Option (ビデオオプション, Bideo Opushon) is a monthly direct-to-video magazine version of the long-running Option magazine introduced in March 1988 by Sunpro.

== Programme format ==
The video has always been presented by Daijiro Inada, who did many of the tuner car road tests, either on a test track, on public road with Daijiro's adventures at Bonneville. During the video early days, the series used to cover illegal races usually in expressways, which is sometimes contributed by an anonymous figure called "Chiba Kun". Nowadays the series features Wangan competitions and unlike the rival Best Motoring series, the show is more focused on drift, drag, time attack, speed tests and mountains rather than pro racing techniques or circuit practises.

The series also covers Inada's escapade at the Silver State Classic from the unfortunate (1999), to having narrowly escaped (2003) and the unintentionally hilarious (2005).

Option Video has always covered drifting, even hosting one of the first drift contests in 1989 with Keiichi Tsuchiya called the Ikaten. Option would continue to cover drift events especially their own Ikaten, until in October 2000, they would introduce the D1 Grand Prix which appears exclusively on the videos. They also gave the Americans their very first drifting events in 1996 at Willow Springs International Raceway, California, which incidentally was won by a Honda Civic, it was not until seven years later Option gave them their first oversea D1 Grand Prix event.

In 2005, the video series followed the season of former judge turned competitor Manabu Orido in his quest to compete in D1. Other highlights in the show includes the owner of tuner Top Secret, Kazuhiko "Smokey" Nagata run-ins with the law in both the UK and New Zealand in 1998 and 2000 and the video contribution of Chiba-Kun and his exploits in his Nissan Skyline GT-R at the Bayshore Route(Wangan) of the Shuto Expressway especially his run-ins with the law.

Beside the series high speed adventures, there is a segment called Go-Go Daijiro (Go!Go!大二郎) in which the Inada test drives other unusual form of transportation not normally covered in by the magazine, for example VIP style cars (customised luxury saloons) and the segment called D1 Gals which the stars of the segment (Kazumi Kondo and the D1 Gal of previous year, Hatsuno Sugaya) are tested in for example, their knowledge in car maintenance and what car they drive for comedy results. The show tends to cover Takayasu Ozaku's (more commonly known as Zaku) close up shot of campaign girls at the Tokyo Auto Salon, especially sequences which he upskirts them.

Magazine contributors Keiichi Tsuchiya, Nobuteru Taniguchi, Eiji Yamada, Ken Nomura, Manabu Suzuki, Manabu Orido are also guest presenters.

In 2004, to satisfy the demand of US D1 Grand Prix fans who watched the Irwindale round, Sunpro introduced an English-language version called JDM Option. Unlike many Japanese orientated videos, JDM Option retains many of the original voiceovers with English narration. This segment was dropped from the Japanese version altogether 2007 onward. Another feature to be omitted from the Japanese version are the commercials that has been a feature since 2005, these commercials only apply to D1 coverages. Also many segments from the Japanese versions are omitted, whereas many features from the non-Japanese version, such as the US events do not appear in the Japanese versions.

== Highlights ==
- The video magazine, always had numerous scrapes with the law in the past, the most notable was the Super Street Series (abbreviated as SSS), the series involves speed runs on public roads in the mid to late '90s.
- The series featured a segment which "Tarzan" Yamada as a human guinea pig, where he was tested for various dangerous stunts.

== See also ==
- Import scene
- Japan domestic market
- Option (car magazine)
- D1 Grand Prix
