= Nissan 350Z =

Nissan 350Z (Z33)
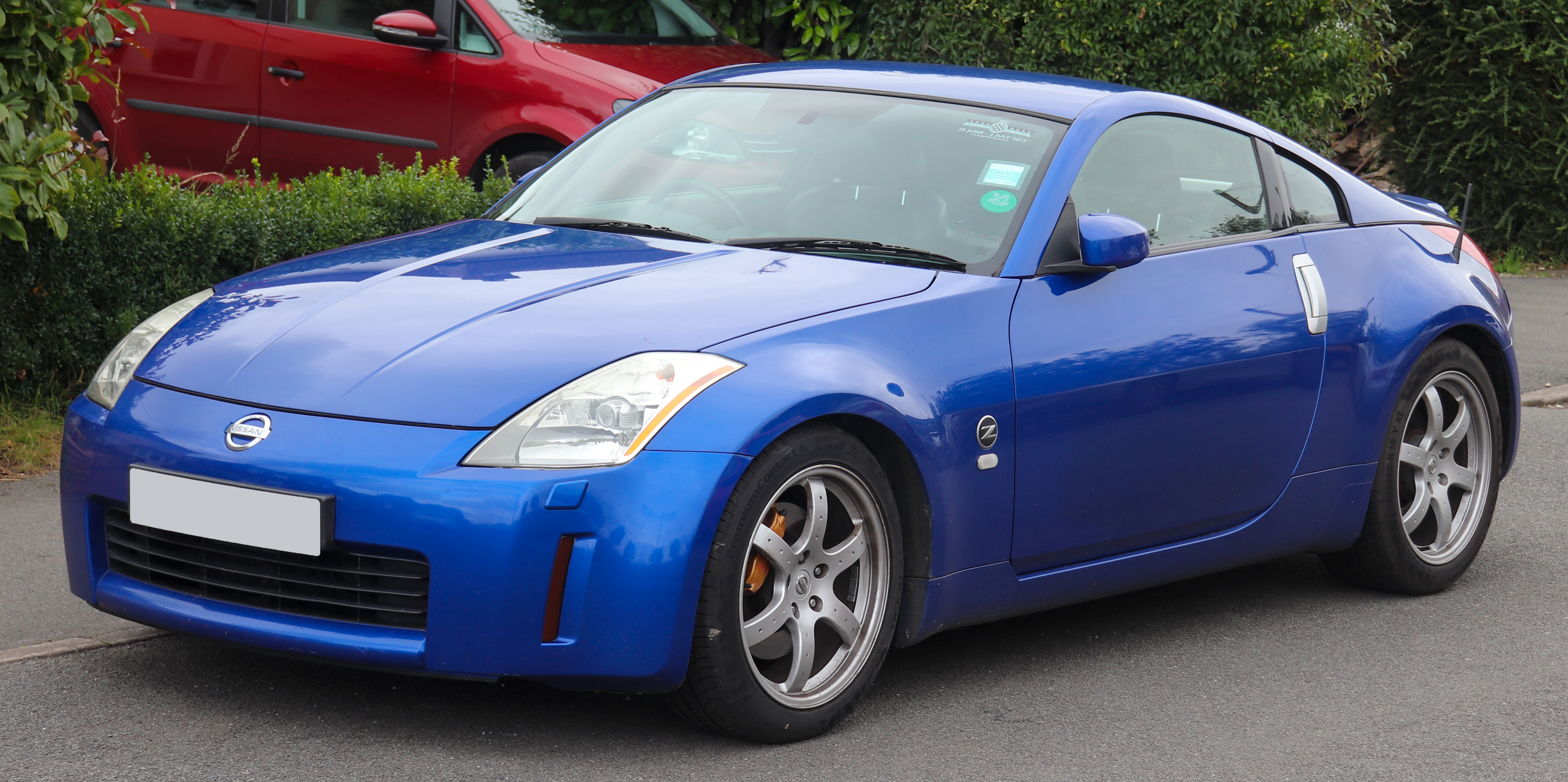

Overview
- Manufacturer: Nissan
- Also called: Nissan Fairlady Z
- Production: July 2002–2008 (Coupe); 2003–2008 (Roadster)
- Model years: 2003–2009
- Assembly: Japan: Oppama (2002–2003); Japan: Kaminokawa, Tochigi (2003–2008)
- Designer: Ajay Panchal at Nissan Design America (2000)

Body and chassis
- Class: Sports car (S)
- Body style: 2-door hatchback coupé; 2-door roadster
- Layout: Front mid-engine, rear-wheel-drive
- Platform: Nissan FM platform
- Related: Infiniti G35; Nissan Skyline (V35)

Powertrain
- Engine: 3.5 L VQ35DE V6; 3.5 L VQ35HR V6
- Transmission: 6-speed FS6R31A manual; 5-speed RE5R05A automatic

Dimensions
- Wheelbase: 2,649 mm (104.3 in)
- Length: 4,303 mm (169.4 in) (2003–2005); 4,314 mm (169.8 in) (2006–2008)
- Width: 1,816 mm (71.5 in)
- Height: 1,318 mm (51.9 in) (2003–2005 Hatch); 1,328 mm (52.3 in) (2003–2005 Roadster); 1,324 mm (52.1 in) (2006–2008 Hatch); 1,334 mm (52.5 in) (2006–2008 Roadster)
- Curb weight: 3,117.4–3,602 lb (1,414.0–1,633.8 kg)

Chronology
- Predecessor: Nissan 300ZX (Z32)
- Successor: Nissan 370Z (Z34)

The Nissan 350Z (known as Nissan Fairlady Z (Z33) in Japan) is a two-door, two-seater sports car that was manufactured by Nissan Motor Corporation from 2002 until 2009 and marks the fifth generation of Nissan's Z-car line. The 350Z entered production in 2002 and was sold and marketed as a 2003 model from August 2002. The first year there was only a coupe, as the roadster did not debut until the following year. Initially, the coupe came in Base, Enthusiast, Performance, Touring and Track versions, while the Roadster was limited to Enthusiast and Touring trim levels. The Track trim came with lightweight wheels and Brembo brakes, but its suspension tuning was the same as all other coupes. The Nissan 350Z was succeeded by the 370Z for the 2009 model year, although the roadster was sold alongside the 370Z for 2009.

== Background ==
After the Nissan 300ZX was withdrawn from the U.S. market in 1996, Nissan initially tried to keep the Z name alive by re-creating the 240Z the following year. The car was conceived by Nissan's North American design team in their free time, and the concept was introduced in a four state Road Show in July 1998 to various car media, dealers, and employees. Yutaka Katayama, regarded as the "Father of the Z" unveiled the Z concept sketch to the public when he received a motor industry award. The design, representing a modern vision of the 240Z, did not please the original 240Z designer Yoshihiko Matsuo, who compared it to the Bluebird and Leopard.

The 240Z concept was produced for the Detroit Motor Show during the following August and September. Nissan was unhappy with the first design as they felt the original 200 bhp (149 kW; 203 PS) 2.4 L KA24DE engine that was going to be assigned made the car feel underpowered. They also felt the car was considered too "retro" or too "backward" resembling a futuristic 240Z; hence, a redesign was commissioned. During a press conference in February 2000, president Carlos Ghosn announced plans to produce the car as he felt the new model would help to assist the company's recovery.

The Z Concept was unveiled in Detroit Motor Show two years later, which was similar in body shape but with a new front end. The car then underwent a minor redesign and was eventually assigned the 3.5 L VQ35DE engine, hence becoming known as the 350Z.

== Concept models ==
=== Middle Sport (1997) ===
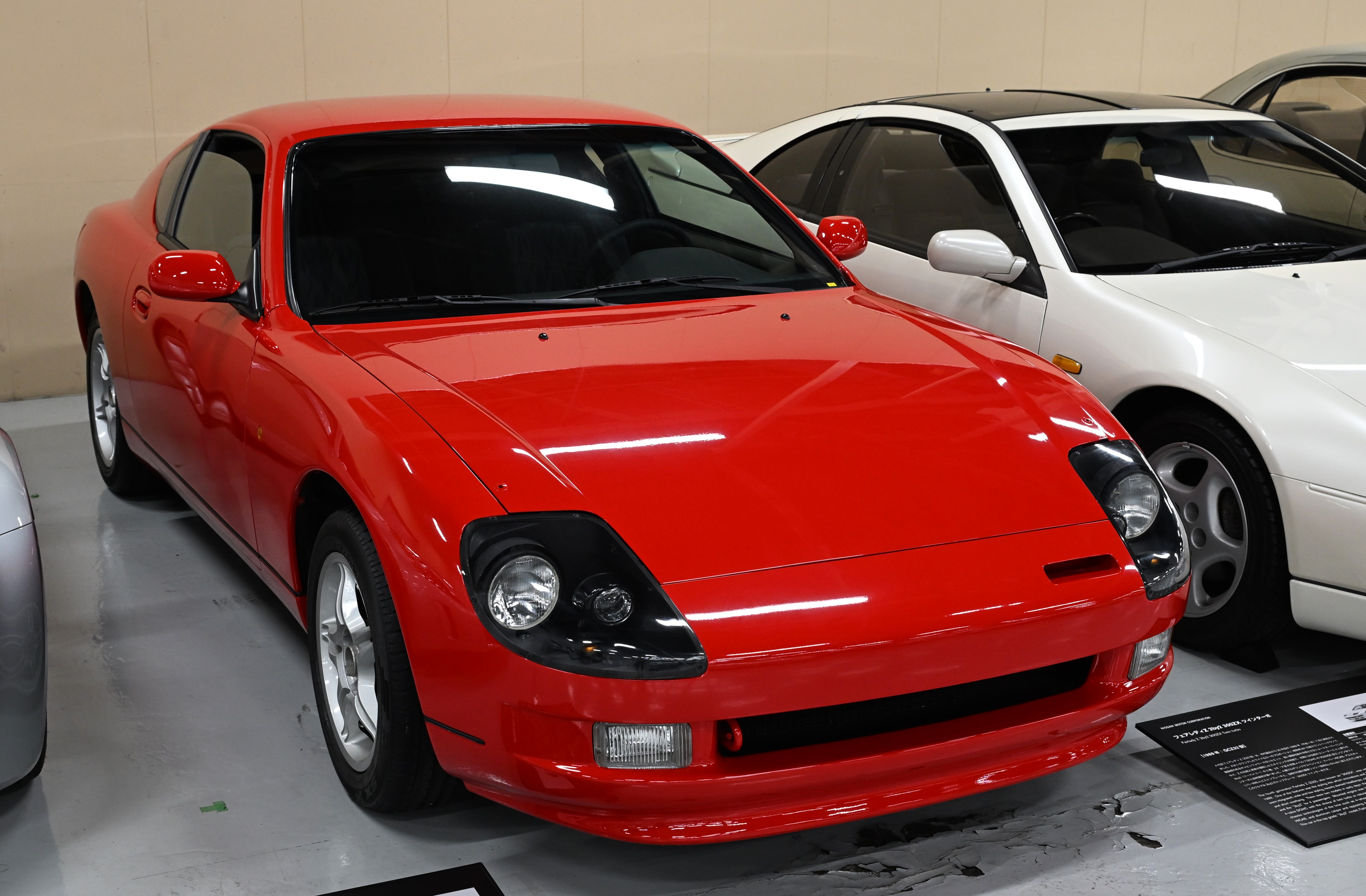
1997 Nissan Middle Sports

In the mid-1990s, Nissan planned a replacement for the Z32 generation. The prototype was named "Middle Sports". The "Middle Sports" featured a 2.4-litre inline 4 KA24DE tuned to 200 horsepower and 256 Nm of torque, mounted in a front-midship configuration. Based from the redesigned 240SX. the front bumper resembles the 240ZG, but the front bumper design, rear taillights, and black pinstripes on the sides also show strong influences from the Z32. The rear side windows have been made smaller and the C-pillar appears thicker, suggesting a design that was intended to be a two-seater.

=== 240Z concept (1999) ===
The 240Z Concept displayed in the same "Lemans Sunset" color seen on the 350Z

Nissan unveiled the 240Z concept car at the 1999 North American International Auto Show, then later at the Los Angeles Auto Expo. The concept was based primarily on a design sketch by Manny Baker of Nissan's California design studio. In a reference to the original, it was a bright orange two-seater with swept-back styling. It was a fully functional car with its 2.4 L 4-cylinder KA24DE engine from the Nissan Altima producing 200 bhp (149 kW) and 180 lb⋅ft (244 N⋅m) of torque, and not the Z-car's traditional 6-cylinder engine. It was thought a less than worthy successor to the line. The designers used an original 240Z to provide inspiration and the concept was created in only 12 weeks. Automotive critics described "it would be cool but get a new model." This design served the intended purpose of creating interest, in the public and the corporation, for a new Z car.

== Design and layout ==
The 350Z is a front mid engine, rear-wheel-drive, two-door, two-seat sports car primarily designed by Ajay Panchal, part of a design team led by Diane Allen of Nissan Design America in San Diego, California in 2000. This program was inspired by the successful reception to the 1998 240Z concept model.

The vehicle has the long-hood short-deck design common to the Z-Car family. External design highlights include: sloping fastback style arched roof line, unique brushed aluminum door handles, high waistline, and bulging fenders that are pushed out to the corners of the vehicle.

The Interior design has brushed aluminum accents. The main gauge pod is mounted directly to the steering column allowing its movement to coincide with steering wheel adjustments. Additional gauges are mounted in a center triple gauge cluster (similar to the 240Z/260Z/280Z). Touring models are equipped with the Bose sound system, a six CD changer and a 8-inch Bose subwoofer mounted behind the driver's seat. The 350Z's interior does not have a conventional glove box, but has storage compartments located behind and between the two seats.

== Models ==
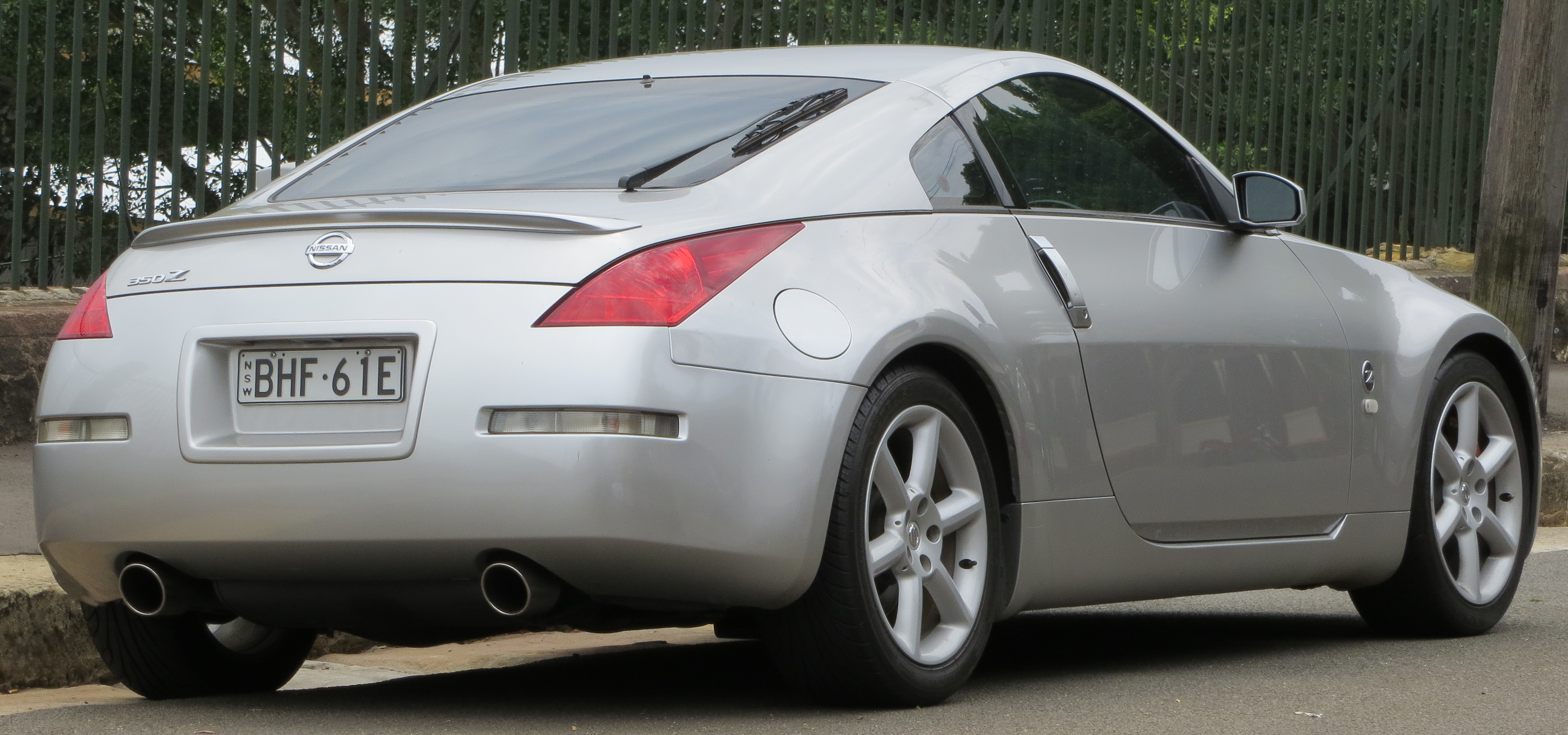
Coupe (pre-facelift)

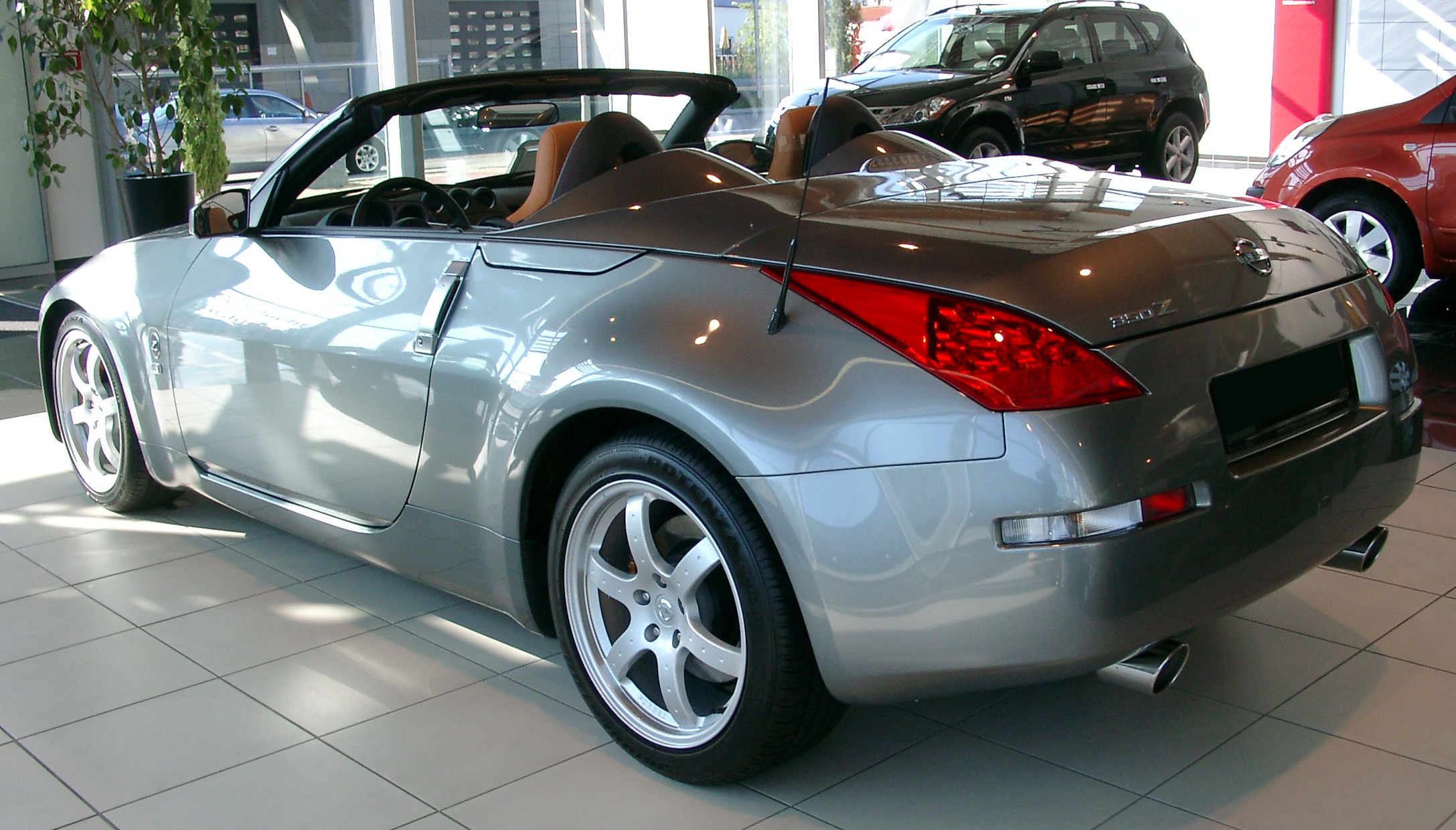
Roadster (pre-facelift)

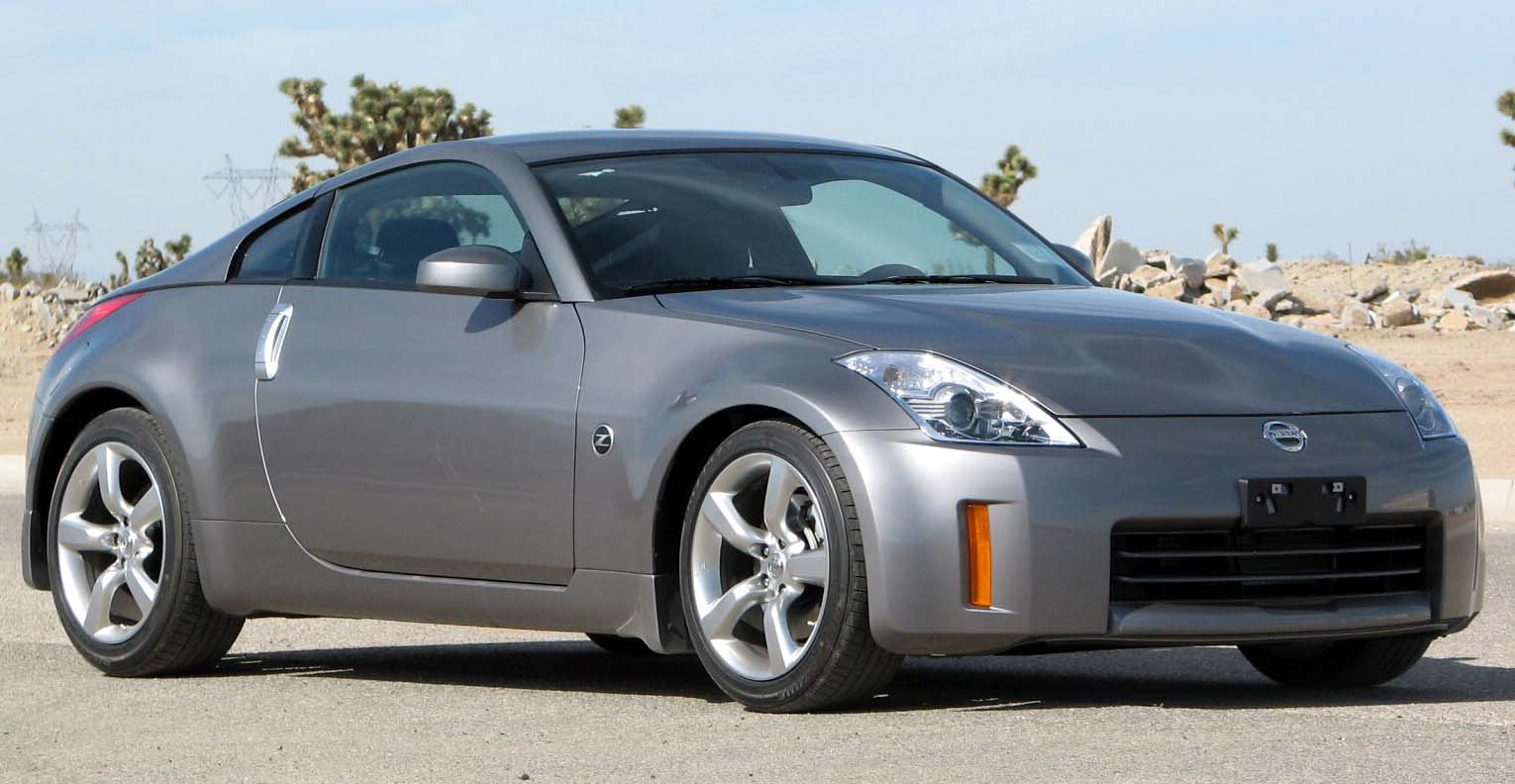
Second facelift Nissan 350Z (US)

Unveiled in 2001 Tokyo Motor Show as the pre-production model, then released in July 2002 in Japan at reorganized Nissan Japanese dealerships called Nissan Blue Stage, and August 20, 2002, in the U.S., the 350Z coupé was available in 5 trim packages: '350Z' (Base), 'Enthusiast', 'Performance', 'Touring', and 'Track' editions. In Europe, only the 'Track' trim was available, although it was badged and marketed as '350Z'. The Base model did not include a VLSD or Traction Control and was only available with cloth seats. It did not include cruise control, nor power or heated seats. The Enthusiast model came with traction control, a VLSD, and cruise control. The Performance model came with larger 18-inch wheels, front air dam, rear spoiler, optional Brembo brakes, and VDC instead of Traction Control. Touring was made more of the luxury model. It had power, leather, heated seats, VDC, a VLSD, xenon headlamps, optional Brembo brakes, 18-inch wheels, and optional GPS Navigation. The Track model included Brembo brakes, front air dam, rear spoiler, traction control, cloth seats, 18-inch wheels, VLSD, and optional GPS Navigation.

In 2004 Nissan introduced the 350Z Roadster with an electrically retractable soft-top roof. In the U.S. market the car was available in two trim packages (Enthusiast and Touring), while in Europe, the same versions as the coupé were offered. Nissan added the Grand Touring (GT) trim to the Roadster trim packages for 2005.

In 2005 Nissan launched the 35th Anniversary edition, with a revised exterior and interior (see Special Editions below). Early 2005 model-year 35th anniversary edition models were equipped with the original VQ35DE engine with 287HP/274TQ and an automatic transmission. In January 2005, Nissan introduced the 35th Anniversary 6-speed manual models and Track models (mid-year introduction), which included the updated VQ35DE 300HP/260TQ 'Rev-up' engine and new updated CD009 manual transmission as well as minor changes to suspension tuning and parts.

For the 2006 model year, the 350Z received changes for its mid-cycle facelift. The VQ35DE 300HP/260TQ 'Rev-up' engine that was introduced mid-year 2005 on the Track and 35th Anniversary Edition with 6-speed manual transmission models was offered for every trim level that had a manual transmission option. The VQ35DE rated at 287 bhp (291 PS; 214 kW) and 274 lb⋅ft (371 N⋅m) of torque continued to be offered with only the 5-speed automatic transmission. Additions included bi-xenon projectors, a revised front fascia, new LED rear lights, changes to the interior trim and speed sensitive steering. Trim levels above the basic enthusiast package received a brake system upgrade including a larger brake booster, front dual piston calipers and larger diameter brake disks. Touring and Grand Touring models had radio-steering controls standard, MP3 CD compatibility, and Satellite Radio became an available option.

For the 2007 model year, the 350Z was again moderately revised. The VQ35DE V6 was replaced with a new VQ35HR V6. It produced 306 bhp (310 PS; 228 kW) at 6800 rpm with 268 lb⋅ft (363 N⋅m) of torque at 4800 rpm using the revised SAE certified power benchmark. The VQ35HR had a raised redline to 7500 rpm and more torque across the rpm range. The hood was redesigned with a bulge reminiscent of the original 240Z to accommodate the raised deck height of the new VQ35HR. In the U.S., trim levels were narrowed down to 350Z (base), Enthusiast, Touring, Grand Touring and NISMO, while in Europe the same trim levels remained. Bluetooth was added for the 2007 model year.

== Special editions ==
=== Fairlady Z Type E (2004) ===
A total of 5 units, called the Type E, were produced in Japan for homologation requirements to compete in the Super GT series. It has a longer nose and rear overhang, as well as several add-ons for aerodynamic purposes. The Type-E engine is rated at 213.99 kW (287 hp; 291 PS) at 6,200 rpm and 363 N⋅m (268 lb⋅ft) of torque at 4,800 rpm.

=== 350Z 35th Anniversary Edition (2005) ===
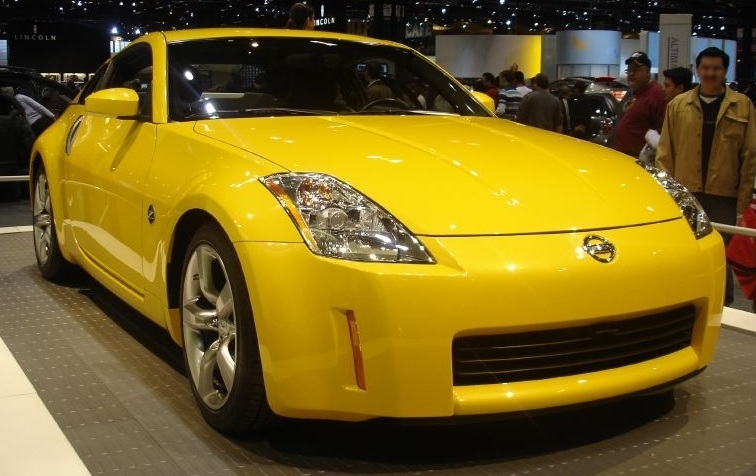
Nissan 350Z 35th Anniversary Edition

To commemorate the 35th anniversary of the debut of the Datsun 240Z, Nissan released a tuned version of the 350Z coupé. The 35th Anniversary Z was exhibited at the Specialty Equipment Marketing Association (SEMA) Show in Las Vegas on November 2, followed by the Miami Auto Show in early November. It went on sale in January 2005.

The 35th Anniversary Edition includes an updated VQ35DE 300 hp (224 kW) V6 engine for the six-speed manual transmission model. Other equipment (standard on six-speed manual-equipped versions) includes 18 inches (457 mm) cast aluminum-alloy wheels, front spoilers, Brembo brakes and special Z badging. The car was available in a special "Ultra Yellow", "Silverstone grey","Super Black" and "Pearl Blue" colors. The interior was also available with a black set configuration. Also included was a Bose 6-speaker premium sound system. A version of the 35th Anniversary Edition with a Gran Turismo 4 video game tie-in was also made.

=== 350Z GT-S concept ===
During the 2006 Goodwood Festival of Speed, Nissan Technical Centre Europe (NTCE) unveiled the 350Z GT-S Concept. The GT-S had a unique radial flow supercharger that could be turned on or off via a switch on the dashboard, raising the VQ35DE engine output to 382.6 bhp (285.3 kW; 387.9 PS) and 424.8 N⋅m (313.3 lb⋅ft) without modifications to the engine components. The car also had new body kit for more cooling and downforce and wider 245 and 265/40/18 tires. The car was tested by automotive journalists, but none were marketed.

=== 2008 Tokyo Auto Salon concepts (2008) ===
The Nissan Fairlady Z Type F, Xanavi Nismo Z (Super GT 2007 GT500 Class), Endless Advan Z (series winner of Japan's Super Taikyu 2007 endurance series) and Fairlady Z Version Nismo Type 380RS were all unveiled at the 2008 Tokyo Auto Salon.

=== Fairlady Z Type F (2008) ===
The Fairlady Z Type F is a version of the Nissan Fairlady Z coupe and roadster for the Japanese market with:

- Choice of 6 body colors (premium blaze red (3 coat color), premium sunshine yellow (3 coat pearl), premium mystic maroon (multiflex color), blade silver metallic, diamond black pearl, white pearl (3 coat pearl)
- Exclusive red heated leather seats, red leather wrapped steering wheel, shift knob, parking brake lever, door trim and arm rest stage, aluminum door kickplates, Rays forged aluminum wheels, power seats (slide, reclining), BOSE audio system, Brembo brakes, and more. Buyers with Premium blaze red, Premium sunshine yellow, Premium mystic maroon color models (100 units each) before March 31, 2008, also received Fairlady Z original key holders.

The vehicles went on sale on January 10, 2008.

== Nismo editions ==
Nissan's performance tuning division, Nismo, began producing modified versions of the 350Z shortly after its introduction.

=== Nismo R-Tune (2004) ===
The R-Tune was a kit sold directly to customers with modifications including new headers, cams, pulleys. The R-Tune voids the Nissan factory warranty, but gains significant horsepower, intended for track racers.

=== Nismo S-Tune GT (2005) ===
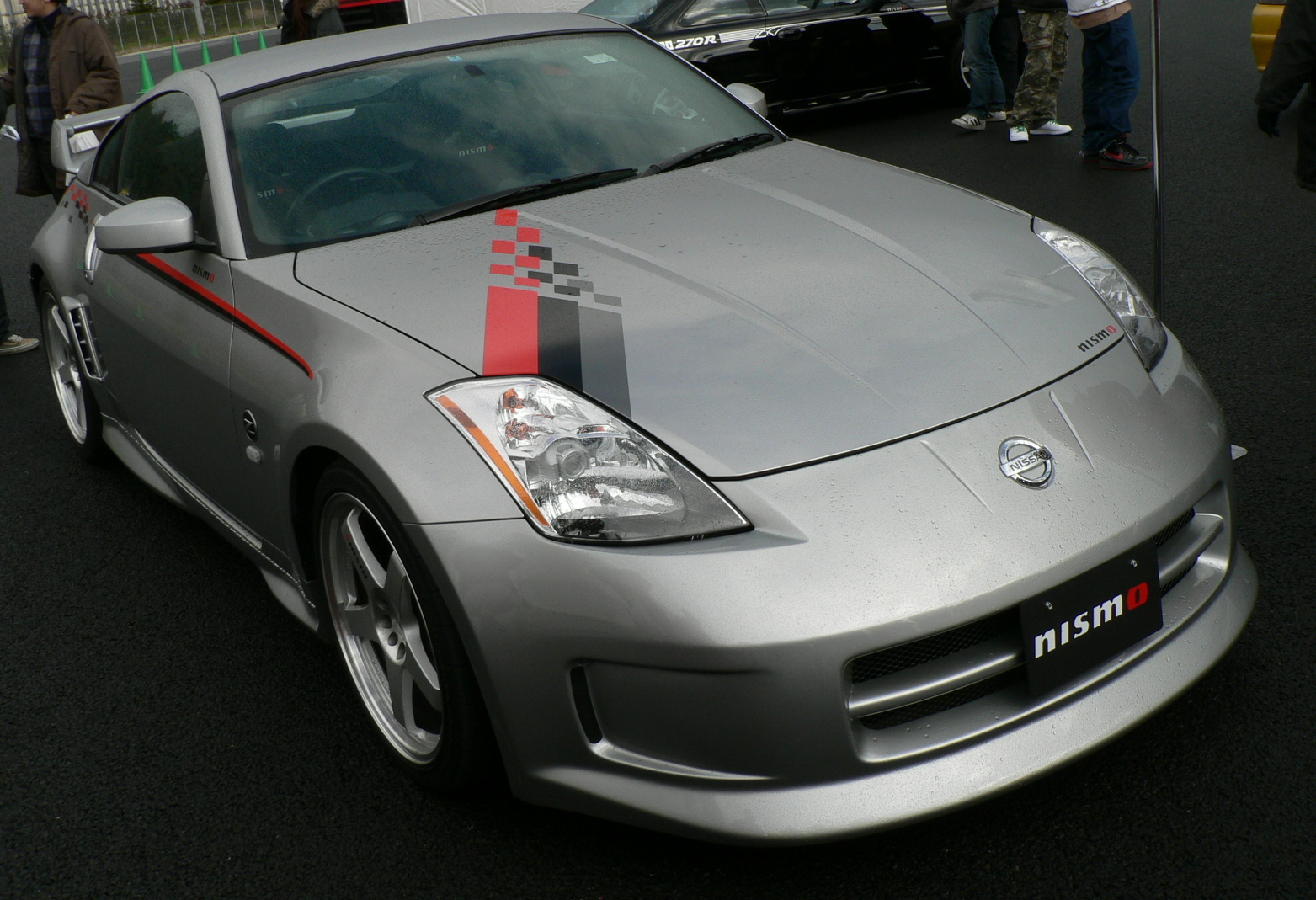
Nismo S-Tune GT

The S-Tune GT was released by Nismo to celebrate its success in the Super GT series. The S-Tune GT had revised long nose bodywork as in the Type-E, a modified version of the VQ35DE engine called the S1 which featured more power (316 PS (232 kW; 312 hp)) and a higher redline (7,200 rpm), as well as a sportier Nismo suspension.

20 were produced each month in Japan. Although Nissan did not officially sell S-Tune in UK, Nissan Motor (GB) Ltd. imported 1 S-Tune GT to UK.

=== Nismo 350Z (2007–2008) ===
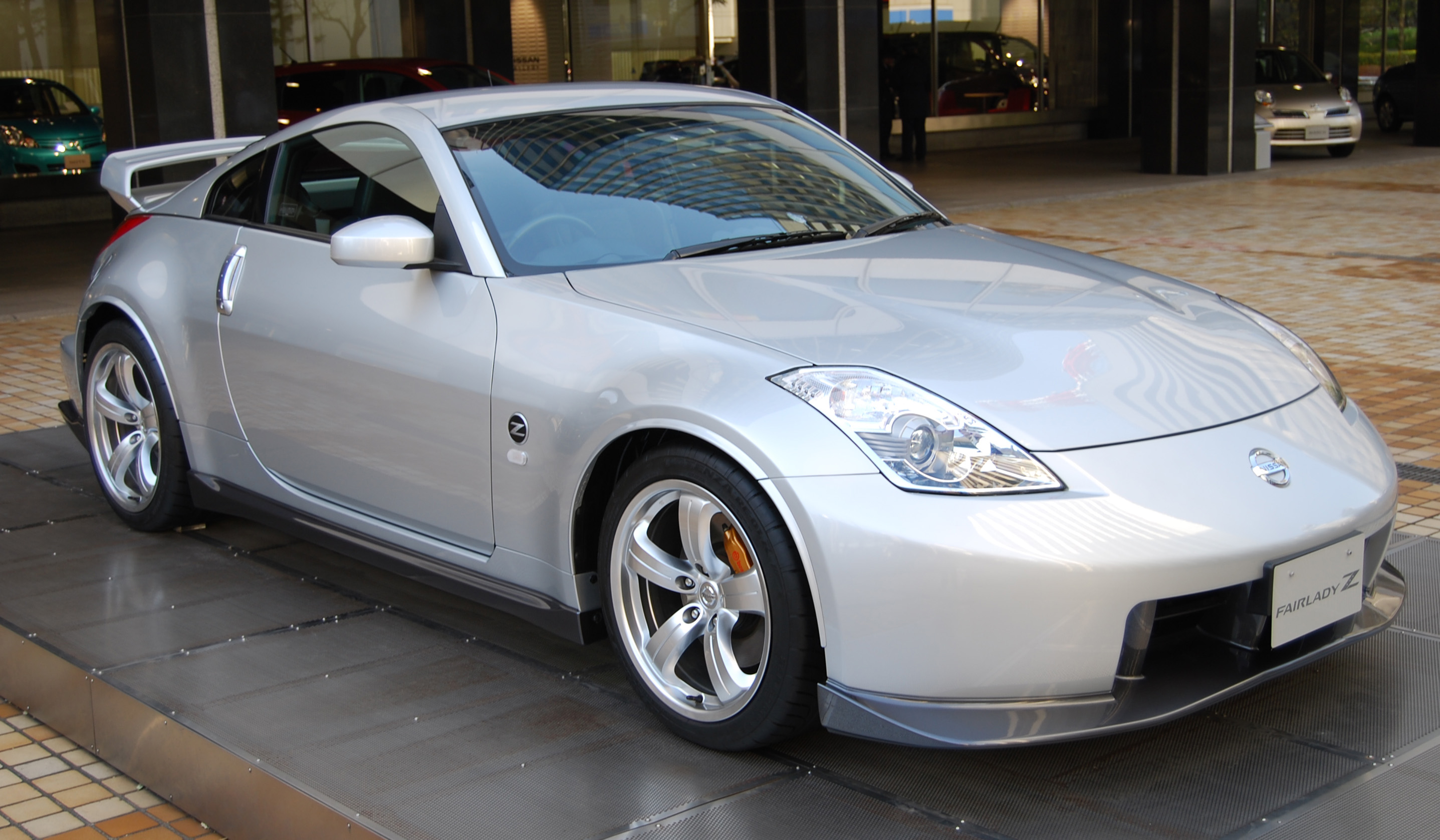
Nismo 350Z

The Nismo edition of the Nissan 350Z Coupé debuted at the New York International Auto Show on April 4, 2007. This version had the same engine as the regular 350Z (VQ35HR), but was only available with a 6-speed manual transmission and a viscous-type limited-slip differential (VLSD), Traction Control System (TCS) and a Nismo aerodynamics package based on the Super GT championship car, which included an aggressive front fascia with chin spoiler, side skirts, an extended rear fascia with an underbody diffuser and a rear wing. The vehicle also featured Nismo-tuned independent multi-link suspension developed by Yamaha, Brembo brakes with four-piston front and two-piston rear calipers (with 12.8-inch (330 mm) front and 12.7-inch (320 mm) rear rotors) and Nismo-branded gunmetal grey RAYS forged alloy wheels and a Nismo-branded tuned exhaust. Yamaha also included front and rear dampeners to help with stability of the chassis.

The conversion process for the Nismo 350Z began with a limited number of chassis being pulled from the assembly line to be sent to Nissan-tuner Autech to have structural seams hand-welded for greater body rigidity. This process made the Nismo 350Z a more capable track car than the other trim levels available at the time.

The Nismo 350Z went on sale in the US in July 2007 at Nissan dealers. 1607 were produced for the 2007 and 2008 model years, and it was assumed that if there was a greater demand, more would be produced, limited to 10% of all 350Z sales. The Nismo model 350Z had a manufacturer's suggested retail price of $38,070 for the 2007 model year.

A Nismo version of the Fairlady Z was also used by the Tochigi Prefecture police force.

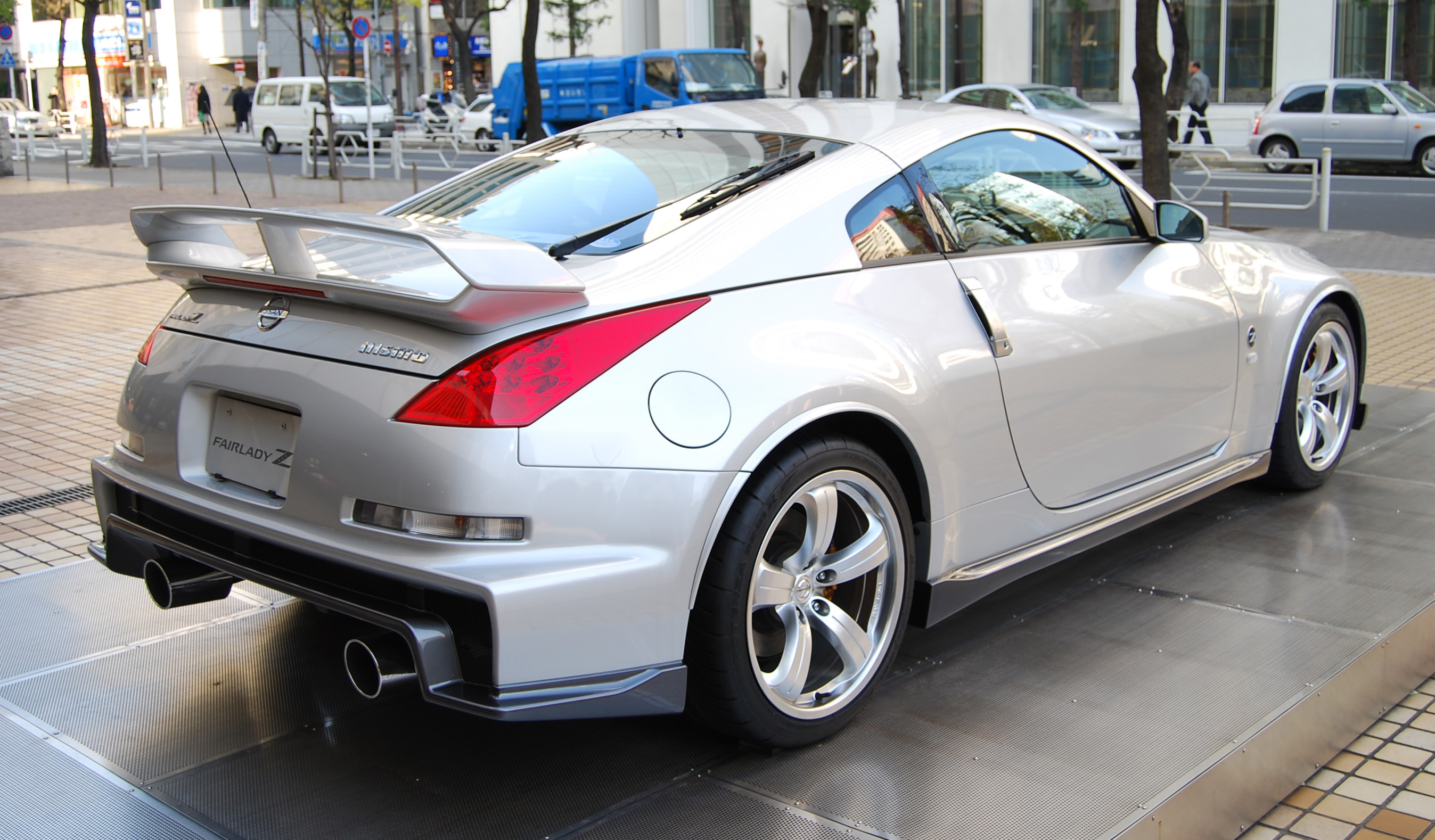
Rear view

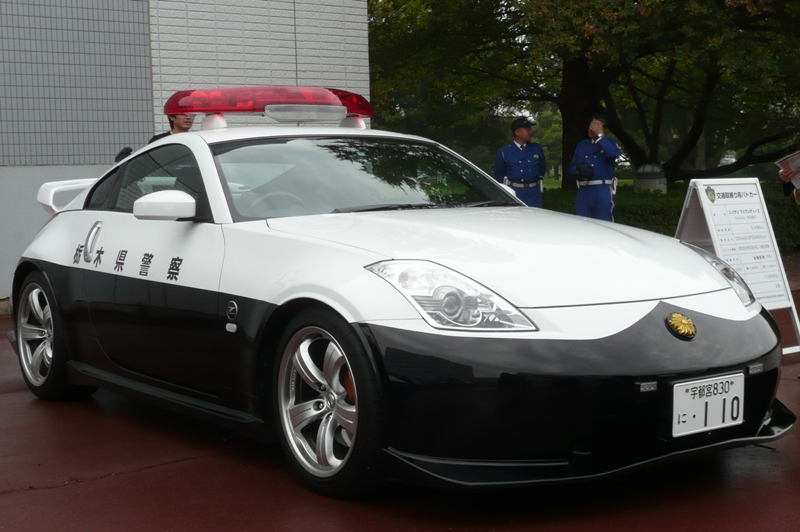
Nismo Fairlady Z police car used by Tochigi Prefecture police force

=== Nismo Type 380RS (2007) ===
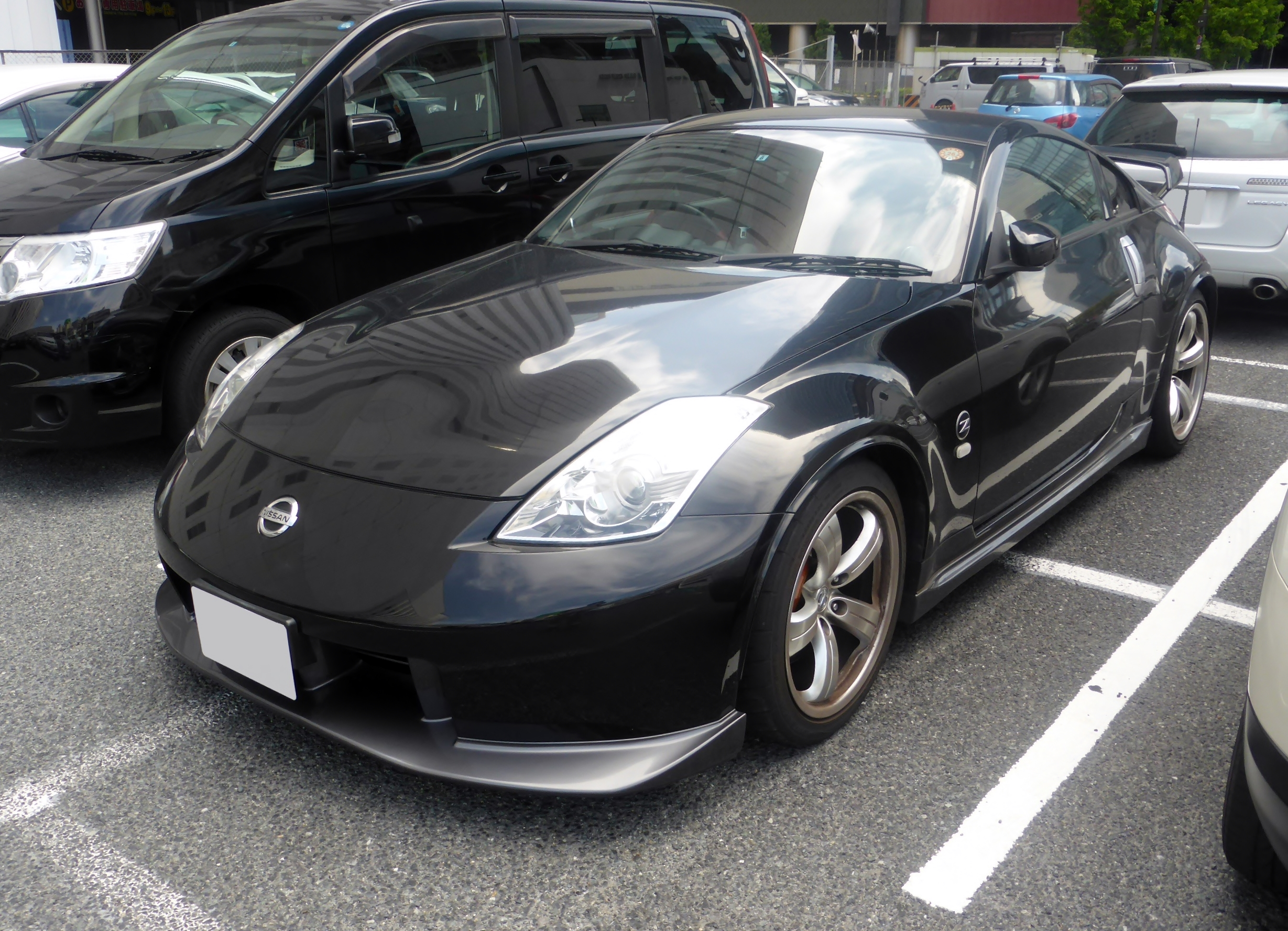
Nismo Type 380RS

Released as the road version for Japanese market of the Type 380RS-Competition race car, the Type 380RS includes a detuned version of the 380RS-C race engine, rated at 257 kW (349 PS; 345 hp) at 7,200 rpm and 397 N·m (40.5 kgf·m/293 lbf·ft) of torque at 4,800 rpm. Brembo disc brakes are fitted, front and rear dampers from Yamaha and forged RAYS alloy wheels.

Nismo Type 380RS is priced 5.397 million (5.14 million+tax) yen (US$38,695). Only 300 units were produced from 2007 through 2008.

=== Nismo Type 380RS-Competition ===
The Nismo Type 380RS-Competition is the race car on which Nismo Type 380RS is based. The 3,798 cc engine (VQ38HR) is rated at 294 kW (400 PS) at 7,500 rpm and 421 N m (43 kgf m) of torque at 5,200 rpm. This in turn is based on the GT 500 race car that Nissan enters into the Super GT championship.

According to Nissan, the race car cost 26.25 million yen.

== Motorsport ==
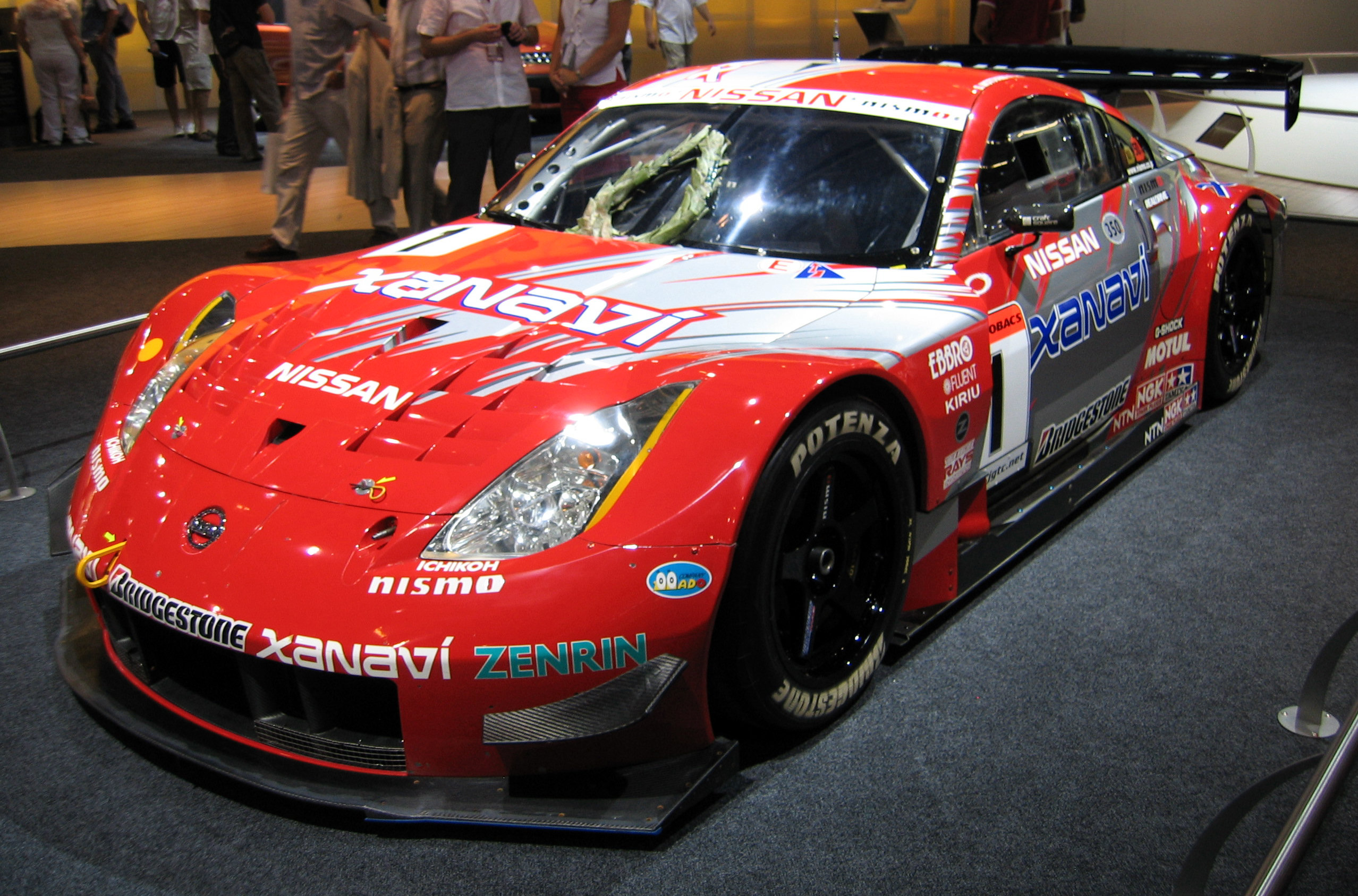
Xanavi Nissan 350Z GT at the 2006 British International Motor Show

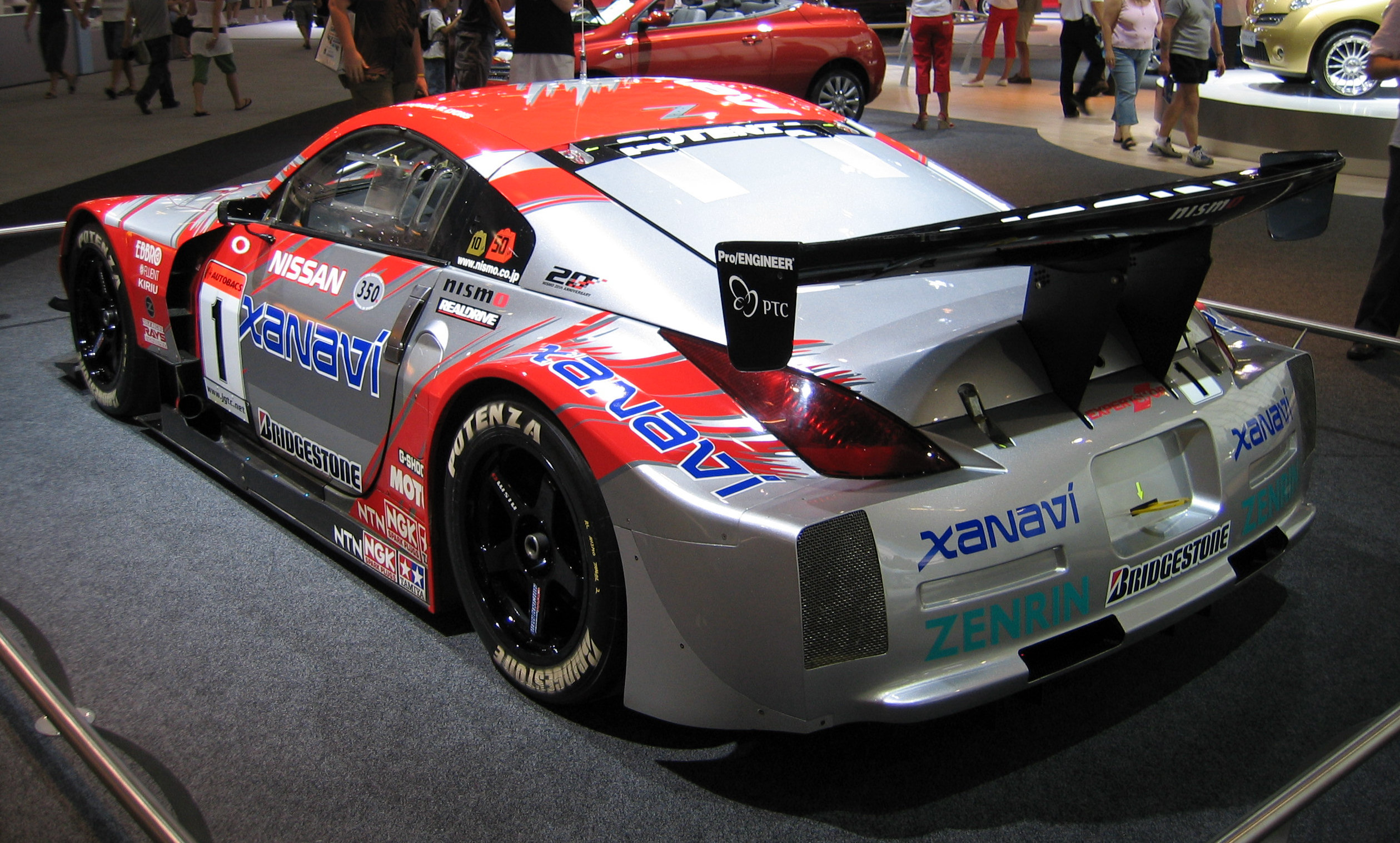
Xanavi 350Z, rear

=== Grand Am ===
Since its introduction in 2002, it did not take long for drivers and teams to enter a 350Z for competition when B.J. Zacharias and Michiel Schuitemaker of Schuitemaker Motorsports helped the car to make its début in the Grand-Am Cup Series at the start of the 2003 season. They have taken a few podium finishes with Unitech Racing who is also the other team to field a Z33, but effort was proved to be successful under the name of Geddings Racing scoring wins along with the other current Grand-Am entrant East Competition Promotorsport. The Grand-Am Cup car has also been used in the new FIA GT4 European Cup. Schuitemaker Motorsports with drivers Michiel Schuitemaker and BJ Zacharias won 3rd place in the '03 Grand-Am Cup season. The following year, they improved and finished in 2nd place. After winning 3rd overall in the '03 season, Nissan had Wright Tuning build a new 350Z race car for the '04 season. This car differed from the '03 car in that it was completely stripped and seam welded. The cage was lighter and stiffer by using different diameter tubing where possible. The car used a Menard's built engine with a Pectel engine management system. Overall racing weight was 2,450 lb (1,110 kg) which was the minimum allowable weight for its class. The '04 chassis proved to be the most successful chassis to run in Grand-Am to date. The '03 chassis was sold to a French team with Edouardo Atkatlan as the driver. It still competes in the European "Fun Races" today, winning 2nd place in the inaugural '07 race in Madrid, Spain.

=== JGTC/Super GT ===
The 350Z replaced the Skyline GT-R as the car for Nissan's factory and customer teams in the Super GT's GT 500 class. The cars used are heavily modified and had a longer nose and tail (requiring the production of the Type-E homologation special), carbon fiber bodywork, and a tube chassis. In 2004, Nismo won the GT500 championship. Until the 2007 season, the car was powered by a VQ30DETT V6, then a new 4.5L V8 powerplant was developed. The 350Z, with slightly more pedestrian modifications also competed in the GT300 class, having started there even before the Skyline GT-Rs were replaced, by teams such as Endless Sports and Mola. In 2003 Hasemi Sports won the GT300 championship with the 350Z. In the 2008 season, the 350Zs were all replaced by Nissan GT-Rs in the GT500 class, but they continued to be used in the GT300 class as the GT-Rs exceed the class's horsepower limits. Two 350Zs competed in the series and MOLA won both the Drivers' and Teams' championships in the GT300 class.

=== Super Taikyu ===
The Z33 also appears in Japan's Super Taikyu series, entered by C-West Labs.

=== British GT Championship ===
The British GT Championship also fielded a privateer 350Z which competed in the series until 2006.

=== SCCA ===
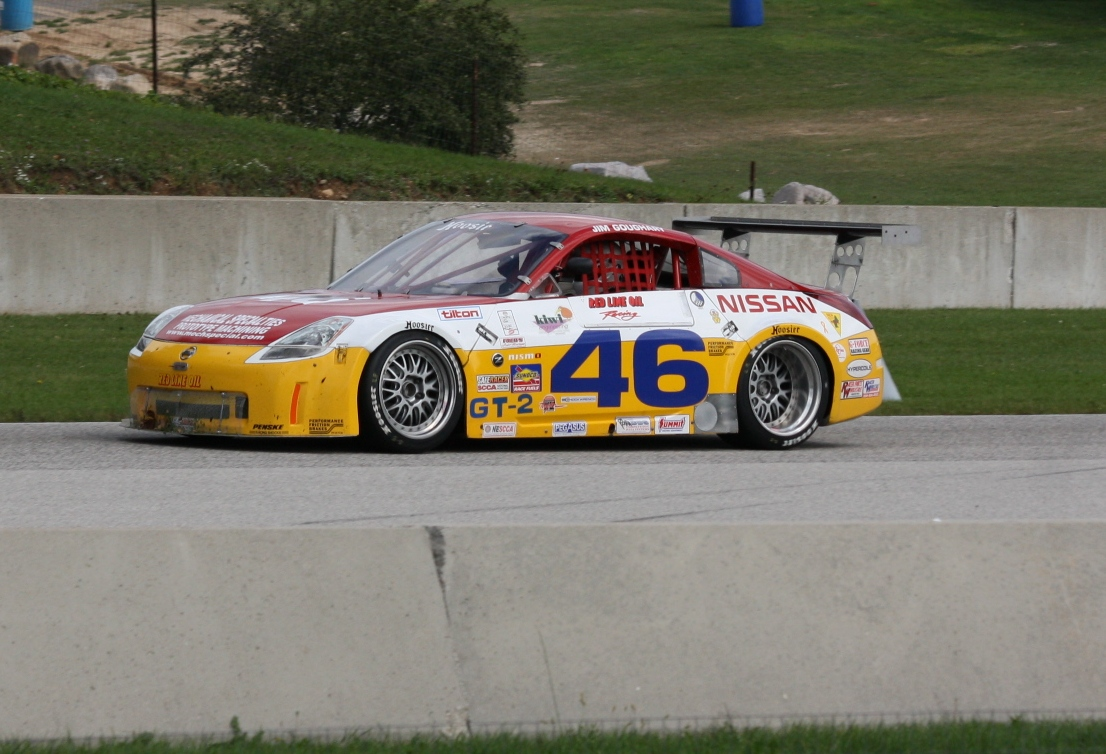
An SCCA GT-2 prepped Nissan 350Z.

The 350Z is a popular choice for amateurs and professionals competing in SCCA events. T.C Kline achieved third place in the 2003 Touring 2 category in one of three Z33s that qualified to the SCCA T-2 runoffs that year. In the SCCA GT2 class, Jim Goughary took the title in the car's debut season.

The car has also seen success in SCCA solo events. In 2006, Carter Thompson's 350Z lost the SCCA National Championship by 0.1 second over two days of competition. The 350Z has achieved a high level of success at the National Solo Championships since 2006. Although production of the 350Z was discontinued in 2009, the car continues to compete in local and national SCCA events. As recently as 2015, 350Z solo drivers Jeff Stuart and Bryan Heitkotter were rated as the top two SCCA drivers competing in national autocross.

=== NASA ===
In 2012, NASA (National Auto Sport Association), created a class of racing specifically for the 350Z. The "Spec Z" class includes all trim levels of the popular 2003-2008 Nissan 350Z in a single class focused on close competition, parity and cost containment that will showcase driving ability and car setup skills. The road racing series is backed by Nissan Motorsports and BFG Tires. The 2012 class rules were in their infant stage, but solidified by mid-2012.

=== Drifting ===
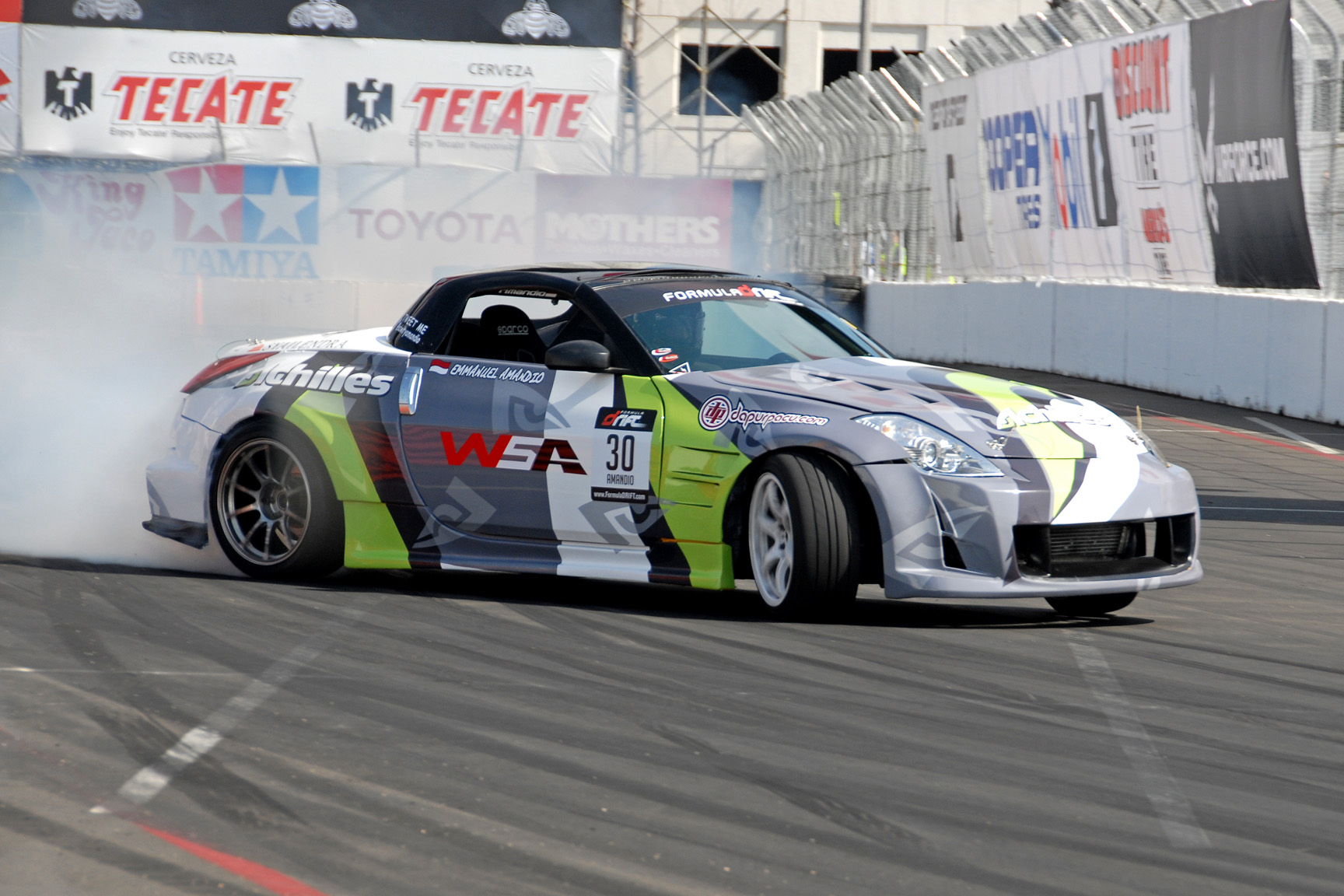
Nissan 350Z drift car competing in Formula Drift in 2012

The 350Z is a popular platform for import events and drifting, where in the latter, drivers including Ryuji Miki, Youichi Imamura, Tyler McQuarrie and Tanner Foust have used them with success in the D1 Grand Prix and Formula D series. During the 2006 D1 Grand Prix exhibition event at the Las Vegas Motor Speedway, Tanner Foust, driving a 350Z, became the first competitor to achieve a perfect score of 100. Two Z33s competed in the non-Japanese domestic D1 Grand Prix spin-off series, D1 Great Britain. In the 2007 season, both SVA Imports and Sumo Power competed using 350Zs in the European Drift Championship. In Formula D, Foust was awarded the runner-up spot in Round 1. In Round 2, Chris Forsberg scored a maiden victory in his 350Z Roadster equipped with a VK56DE from a Nissan Titan. Forsberg's win for the 350Z was followed-up by Youichi Imamura's win during the Las Vegas round of the US$1 Grand Prix series in his RB26DETT-engined car. Foust would eventually take his 350Z to the Formula D title.

=== Open road racing ===
Option magazine founder Daijiro Inada used an extensively modified 350Z, dubbed Option Stream Z, to compete in the Silver State Classic Challenge. The car was equipped with a GReddy/Trust T88 turbo-charger and was stroked to 3.8 L to produce over 900 bhp (671 kW; 912 PS). The Option Stream Z appeared in the games Gran Turismo 4, Gran Turismo 5, and Gran Turismo (PSP).

=== Speed trials ===
In 2004, the tuner Dandy and magazine Option entered a Z33 known as the "Option Dandy 380Z" with a donor engine from a salvaged Stream Z with a deleted turbo, producing 370 bhp (276 kW; 375 PS), to compete in the F/GT class for naturally aspirated grand touring sport cars at the Bonneville Speed Week. The car reached a speed of 151 mph (243 km/h), measured over a fixed distance.

== Advertising and promotions ==
To promote the 350Z, Nissan released a short film, "The Run", with a 2003 model being driven in a high-speed run through city streets of up to 200 km/h (124 mph). This took place through the narrow cobblestone streets of Prague in the Czech Republic, and lasted six and a half minutes.

The 350Z has been extremely popular with diecast manufacturers, with companies such as Hot Wheels releasing various colors and styles of the car over the years.

The 350Z benefitted in popularity by making an appearance in The Fast and the Furious: Tokyo Drift, where it was fitted with a Veilside bodykit, amongst other modifications, and was driven by the fictional character "Drift King" Takashi, who was portrayed by Brian Tee.

== Specifications ==
	2003–04	2005	2006	2007	2008	2009
Available Trims	350Z (base), Enthusiast, Performance, Touring, Track	350Z (base), Enthusiast, Performance, Touring, Track, Anniversary	350Z (base), Enthusiast, Touring, Grand Touring, Track	Coupé: Base, Enthusiast, Touring, Grand Touring, Nismo; Roadster: Enthusiast, Touring, Grand Touring		Roadster: Enthusiast, Touring, Grand Touring
Powertrain
Engine	VQ35DE 3.5 L (210 cu in) V6; 287 hp (214 kW; 291 PS) at 6,200 rpm 274 lb⋅ft (371 N⋅m) at 4,800 rpm	VQ35DE 3.5 L (210 cu in) V6; 287 hp (214 kW; 291 PS) at 6,200 rpm 274 lb⋅ft (371 N⋅m) at 4,800 rpm VQ35DE 3.5 L (210 cu in) V6; 300 hp (224 kW; 304 PS) at 6,400 rpm 260 lb⋅ft (353 N⋅m) at 4,800 rpm	VQ35DE 3.5 L (210 cu in) V6; 300 hp (224 kW; 304 PS) at 6,400 rpm 260 lb⋅ft (353 N⋅m) at 4,800 rpm	VQ35HR 3.5 L (210 cu in) V6; 306 hp (228 kW; 310 PS) at 6,800 rpm 268 lb⋅ft (363 N⋅m) at 4,800 rpm		
Transmission	6-speed manual, 5-speed automatic					
Dimensions
Curb Weight	Coupé: 3,188 lb (1,446 kg) (Base); 3,197 lb (1,450 kg) (Enth); 3,217 lb (1,459 kg) (Perf); 3,247 lb (1,473 kg) (Tour); 3,225 lb (1,463 kg) (Track); Roadster: 3,428 lb (1,555 kg) (Enth); 3,462 lb (1,570 kg) (Tour)		Coupé: 3,339 lb (1,515 kg) (Base); 3,346 lb (1,518 kg) (Enth); 3,400 lb (1,542 kg) (Tour); 3,404 lb (1,544 kg) (Grand); 3,353 lb (1,521 kg) (Nismo); Roadster: 3,580 lb (1,624 kg) (Enth); 3,600 lb (1,633 kg) (Tour); 3,602 lb (1,634 kg) (Grand)			Roadster: 3,580 lb (1,624 kg) (Enth); 3,600 lb (1,633 kg) (Tour); 3,602 lb (1,634 kg) (Grand)
Wheelbase	104.3 in (2,650 mm)					
Length	169.8 in (4,310 mm)					
Width	71.5 in (1,820 mm)					
Height	52.1 in (1,320 mm)					

== Sales by calendar year ==
Year	U.S. Sales	Europe
2002	13,253	3
2003	36,728	2187
2004	30,690	6959
2005	27,278	5598
2006	24,635	3955
2007	18,957	2493
2008	10,337	1411
2009	0	424

== Reception ==
The 350Z has been given extensive coverage in the automotive press, and has obtained generally positive reviews. Eddie Alterman, senior editor of Automobile magazine, said of the 350Z "An outstanding performance value. They got all the important stuff right." While David Swigg of Motor Trend said "With a competent driver at the wheel and the traction control switched off, many Boxster drivers would be hard-pressed to post better lap times than with this Z." Top Gear magazine later awarded the Nissan Designers with the 2004 Top Gear Magazine Car of the year award.

Automotive journalists tend to praise the 350Z's value, performance, handling, and braking. Criticisms tend to be directed towards the grade of interior plastics, greater curb weight than its competitors, cabin ergonomics and engine refinement. Other reviews have criticised reflections off the back strut in the rear window.

The 350Z has been recognized including the following:

- Japanese Performance Car of the Year 2007 TopSpeed Magazine
- 10 Best Cars 2003 Car and Driver
- Most Significant Vehicle of the Year. Two years running Edmunds.com
- Editors' Most Wanted 2003 Edmunds.com
- International Car of the Year: Most Sex Appeal Award 2003 Road and Travel
- Canadian Car of the Year 2003 Automobile Journalists Association of Canada
- Best New Design 2003 Automobile Journalists Association of Canada
- Driver's Choice Best Performance Car 2003 MotorWeek
- Winner 12 Best Cars Under 30K Road & Track
- Car of the Year 2004 Top Gear Magazine
- Automobile of the Year 2003 Automobile Magazine

=== In other media ===
- Cover of Need for Speed: Underground 2, and the car owned by Rachel Teller in the game
- Cover of Forza Motorsport 2, GT Cube (and shared cover of Forza Motorsport)
- Poster of The Fast and the Furious: Tokyo Drift

=== Safety ===
The 350Z came with front air bags in standard and supplemental side air bags and curtain air bags as an option. With 143 deaths per million registrations, the two-door 350Z has been one of the least safe 2005–2008 model cars in the United States.

NHTSA crash test ratings (2009 Roadster):

- Frontal Crash Test – Driver:
- Frontal Crash Test – Passenger:
- Side Impact Rating – Driver:
- Rollover Rating: 8.2%

== See also ==
- List of Nissan vehicles
- Nissan VQ engine
- Nissan Z-car
