= Silver State Classic Challenge =

Authorized Open Road Racing event

- Venue: Highway 318
- Location: Nevada: Start 38.8370°N 115.0107°W; Finish 37.6273°N 115.2212°W
- Corporate sponsor: Optima Batteries
- First race: 1988

Circuit information
- Surface: Asphalt
- Length: 90 mi (140 km)
- Lap record: (Robert Allyn and David Bauer, 2001 Chevrolet Monte Carlo, 2017, Stock)

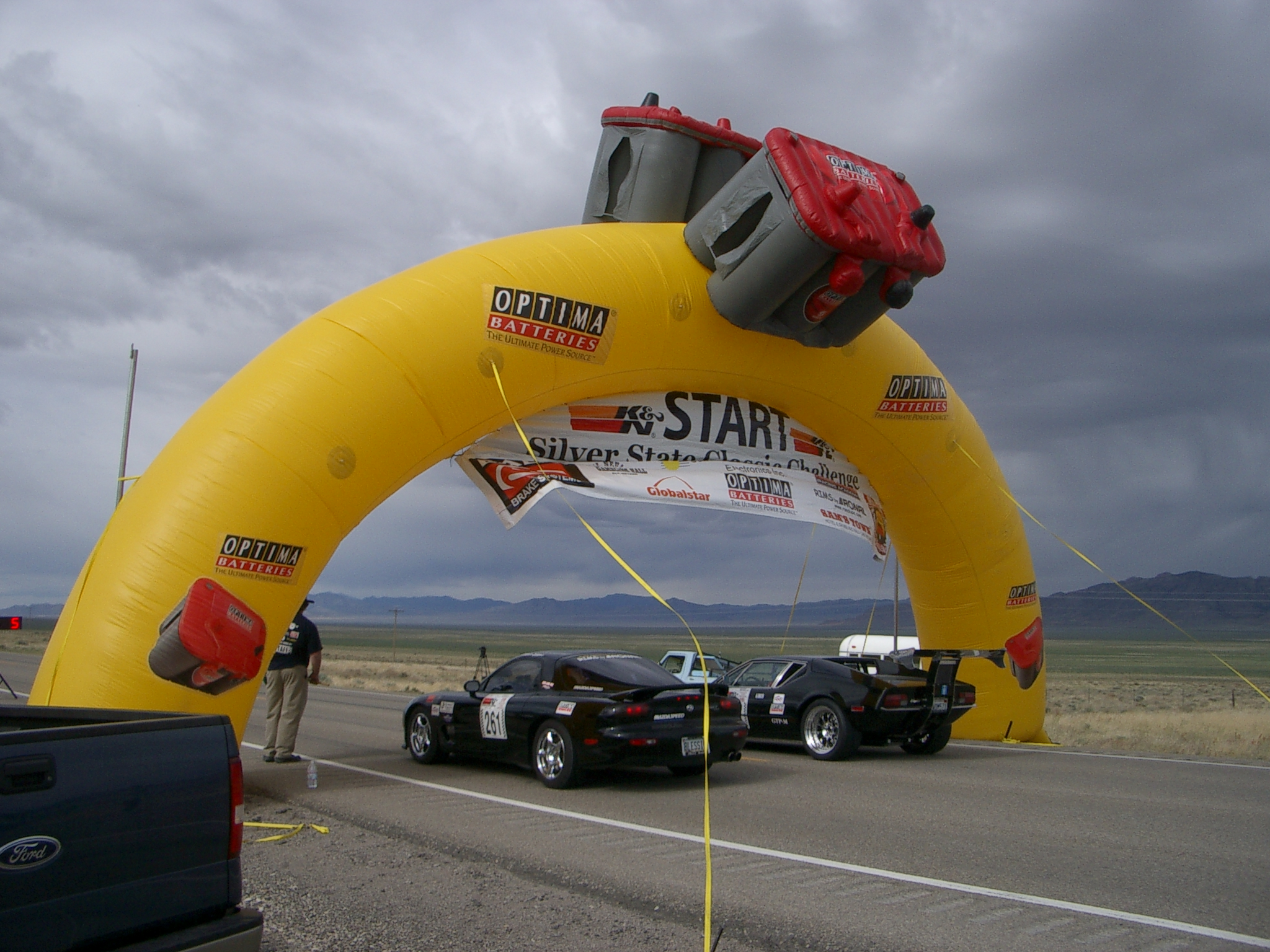
Start of the race

The Silver State Classic Challenge is an authorized Open Road Racing event that is run since 1988 on a 90 mi (140 km) stretch of State Route 318 in Nevada, United States which is closed for the occasion.

Called the fastest road race in the world by Guinness World Records, Robert “Bob” Allyn and David Bauer achieved the highest speed in an open road race there when in 2017 they averaged 219.643 mph (353.481 km/h) driving a 2001 Chevrolet Monte Carlo stock car. Although high-speed race cars receive much of the publicity, the majority of participants take part in mainstream street cars at average speeds ranging from 95 to 155 mph (153 to 249 km/h). These cars run the gamut from sports cars such as Corvettes and Mustangs to coupes such as Nissan Skylines, Mercedes wagons, and even Saturns.

== History ==
Conceived by Steve Waldman, the event was first run on September 25, 1988, primarily as a showcase for vintage cars. With the assistance of the White Pine Chamber of Commerce and the Nevada Department of Transportation, a 90 mi (140 km) stretch of State Route 318 was closed for the day, and approximately fifty cars took part. The following year, Big Red set the record of 197.99 mph (318.63 km/h) was set by a 19‑year‑old driver named R. J. Gottlieb, driving a race-prepared Donovan big-block powered 1969 Chevrolet Camaro Z-28. This run was well documented in a Hot Rod article that year. In the years that followed, the organization became increasingly professional, with rules for safety, car preparation and driver experience becoming more stringent.

An additional event has been run each May since 1991, called the Nevada Open Road Challenge. This follows the same rules as the Silver State Classic Challenge, but on a shorter 60 mile course which is run once in each direction, with a break between the two runs when drivers and navigators have the option to swap positions.

== Rules and Speed Classes ==
Drivers and optional navigators compete to set a specified average speed ("Target Speed") over the 90-mile (140 km) course. The start and finish time for each car is recorded against a GPS clock, and the average speed is calculated from the elapsed time. In each speed class, the winners are driver and navigator to achieve the speed closest to their target speed.

Currently there are four main classes, each of which has several subclasses, where drivers must achieve target speeds between 95 and 180 mph (153 and 290 km/h). The classes specify safety equipment levels required for cars, drivers and navigators, and a maximum "Tech Speed", which may never be exceeded. Radar traps are hidden along the course to enforce this rule. There is also an Unlimited Class, in which drivers compete to set the fastest possible time over the course, with no maximum speed restrictions.

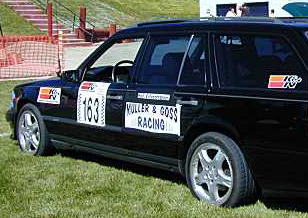
Grand Touring Mercedes Wagon

- Touring Class (Speed classes: 95, 100, 105, 110 mph)

Stock street cars with regular 3-point seatbelts may be run in this class. A handheld fire extinguisher must be fitted, while gloves and Snell approved motorsports helmets must be worn by drivers and navigators. First-time drivers must run in this class unless they have appropriate motorsports experience. At no time may the car exceed the Tech Speed of 124 mph (200 km/h).

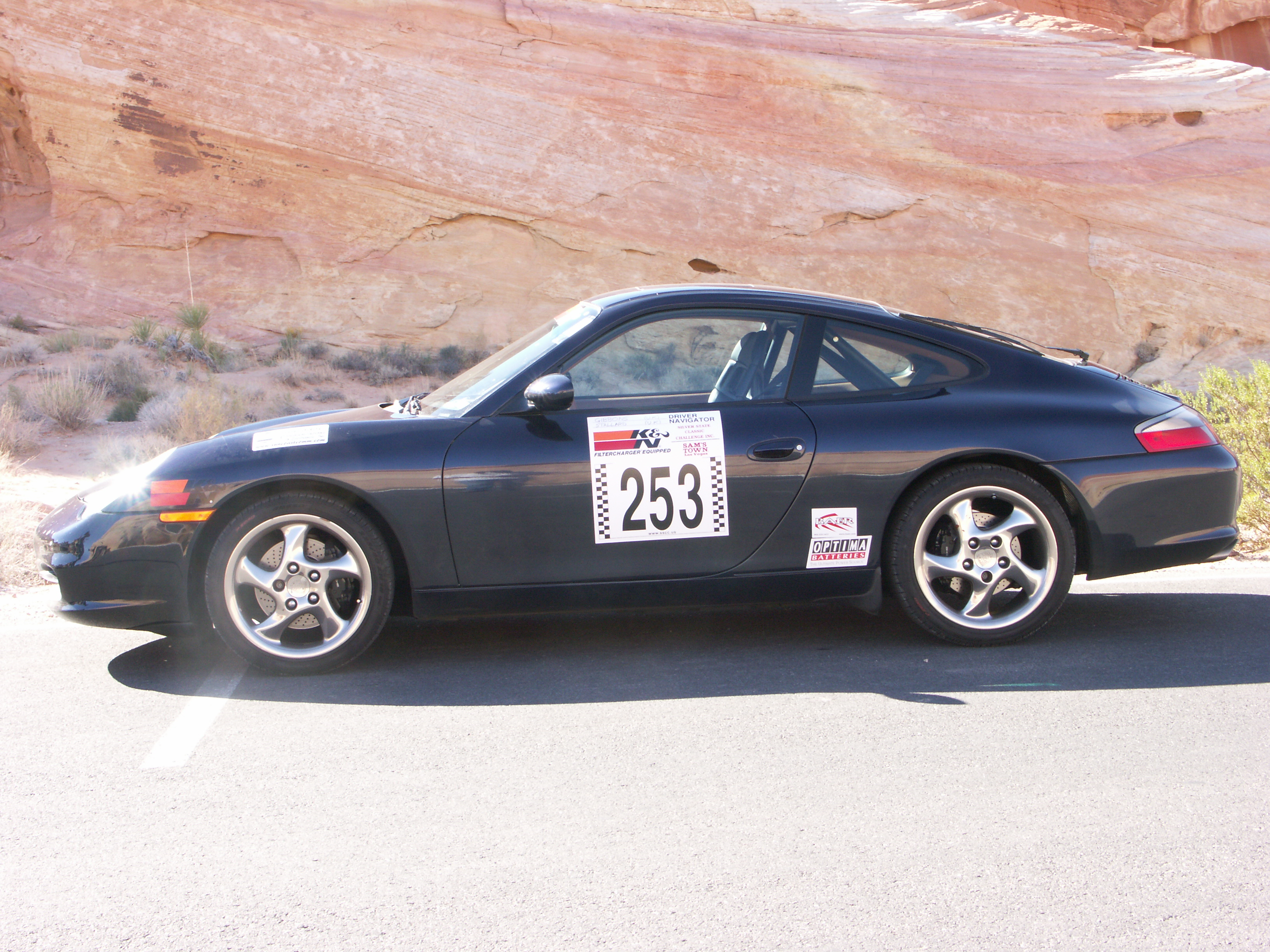
Grand Sport car showing rollbar

- Grand Touring Class (Speed classes: 115, 120, 125 mph)

In addition to a handheld fire extinguisher, gloves and Snell helmets, the car must be fitted with 5-point or 6-point harnesses and (from 2007) window nets or arm restraints for the driver and navigator (if present). Open cars must have a rollbar fitted. At no time may the car exceed the Tech Speed of 140 mph (230 km/h).

- Grand Sport Class (Speed classes: 130, 135, 140, 145, 150, 155 mph)

In addition to the above equipment, all cars must be fitted with a rollbar or equivalent roll-over protection. Drivers and navigators must wear fireproof racing suits. At no time may the car exceed the Tech Speed of 165 mph (266 km/h).

- Super Sport Class (Speed classes: 160, 170, 180 mph, and Unlimited)

In this class, specialist race cars are necessary. A full roll cage, fuel cell and onboard plumbed fire extinguisher are required. Cars in the 160 and 170 mph (260 and 270 km/h) speed classes may not exceed the Tech Speed of 180 mph (290 km/h) at any time. Cars in the 180 mph (290 km/h) and Unlimited classes have no specified maximum speed.

== Other events ==
Over the weekend, there are also two drag events on a local stretch of closed-off highway. This is an unusual event, in that the 6,400 ft (2,000 m) altitude of Ely significantly reduces engine power, so the results are slower than similar events at lower altitude.

On Friday, the Z1Z/Z2Z challenge is held. In this event, competitors attempt to accelerate from a standstill to 100 mph (160 km/h) ("Z1Z" held each May) or 200 mph (320 km/h) ("Z2Z" held each September) and brake to a halt as quickly as possible. Classes are determined by engine size and engine aspiration method. In May 2007, the fastest car took 16.1 seconds and 1,289 ft (393 m) to reach 100 mph (160 km/h) and stop again.

On Saturday, the High Noon Shootout takes place. This is a pure speed event, in which Touring and Grand Touring cars have half a mile to accelerate to the highest possible speed, while Grand Sports cars and above have a one-mile (1.6 km) straight. In May 2007, a new record of 202 mph (325 km/h) was set by a modified Dodge Viper. However, the car was severely damaged in an incident on a subsequent run. In September 2007, the record was raised once again to 212 mph (341 km/h) by Mike Reichen driving a highly modified 1994 Evo II.

== Safety ==
Due to the lack of crash barriers, spectators are not permitted. The only way to watch the race is as one of the safety marshals who man every gate along the course.

There were two fatalities in the first decade of the Silver State Classic Challenge, five altogether with the most recent in 2014. In recent years, much more stringent safety rules have been enforced, with a particularly strong emphasis on the speed and load capacity of the tires. During 2003, a number of drivers questioned the effectiveness of the radio system used by course marshals to monitor cars and (if necessary) to call for medical assistance. This has been addressed through an improved radio communication system, including the loan of a basic 2-way radio to each competitor.

== Management ==
The founding president and chairman of the Silver State Classic Challenge was Steve Waldman, who was also a regular participant in a Dodge Viper and other vehicles. Mr. Waldman was involved in the setting up of the Silver State Classic Challenge from the beginning. The Silver State Classic Challenge awards banquet and hotel sponsor was originally the Showboat Hotel & Casino, where Mr. Waldman was Vice-President of Marketing for the hotel chain. Following the death of Mr Waldman in 2014, operational control of the event has moved to an appointed board of directors, as well as a number of corporate officers with responsibilities ranging from finance to rookie liaison.

== Notable participants ==
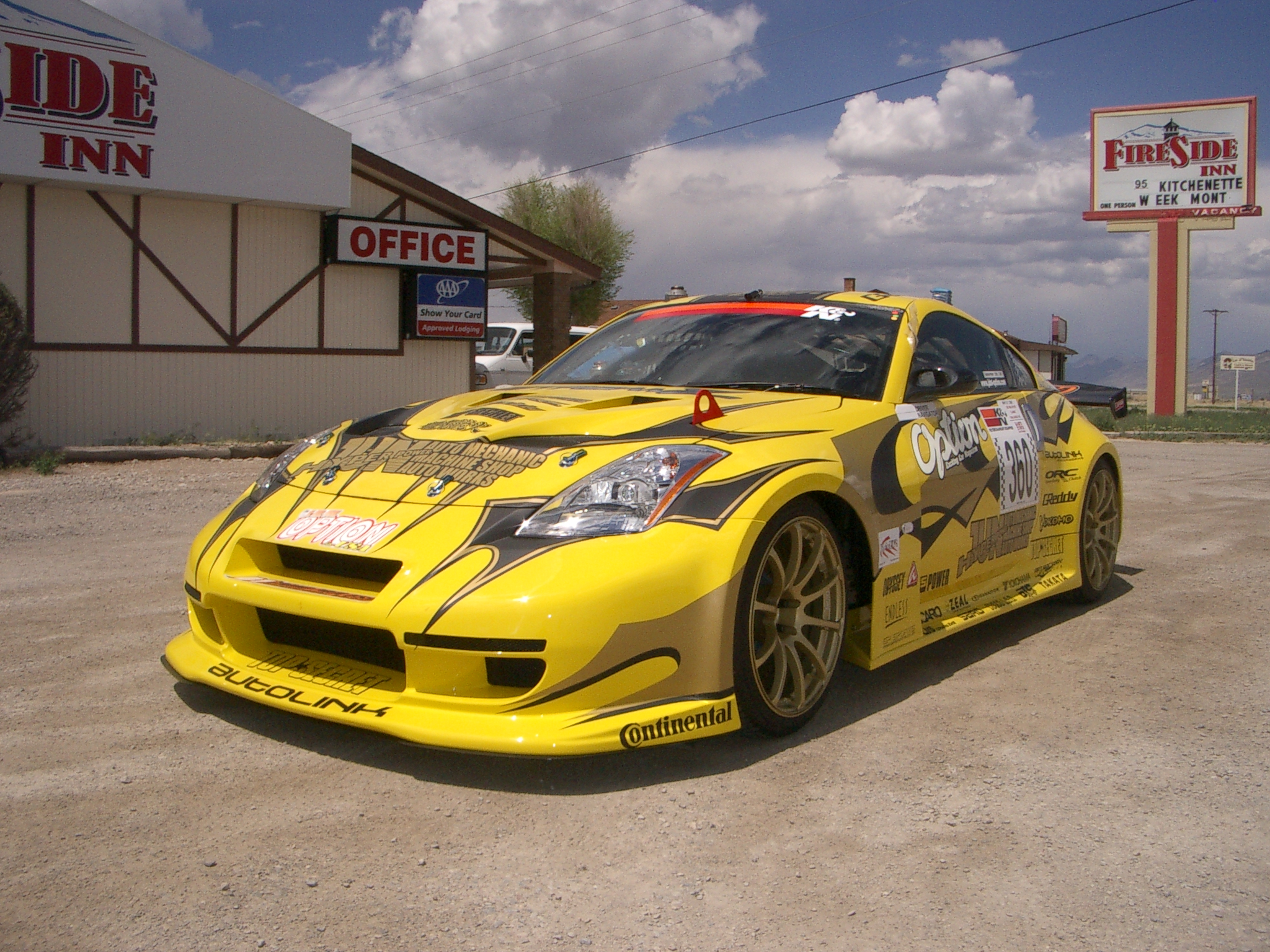
Daijiro Inada's 350Z

One of the event's participants is the Japanese car magazine Option founder Daijiro Inada, a renowned figure in the import, and drifting scene. The video magazine spinoff, Video Option, recorded his attempts at the event in 1999 and from 2003 to 2006. Due to driver error and equipment problems, the 2004 run was the only one he has so far completed successfully. His current car, the Option Stream Z, is an unlimited category Nissan 350Z.

Another high-profile participant, who has had more success, is former The Dukes of Hazzard star John Schneider, who has competed on several occasions in the General Lee.

Jeff Allen, star of CNBC's The Car Chasers and iTunes Skidmarks Show attended in both 2015 and 2016 with his custom build GTR Pennzilla winning the 2016 "Hooker Award", 2016 "Most Beautiful Car", "Fastest Car" in the Half mile shootout and 4th in the Open Road Challenge.

Jeff Schwartz, protouring car builder and chassis designer, won the 2006 Silver State Classic Challenge 0-200 mph-0 (Z2Z) in his homebuilt Ultima GTR, set a record for fastest 0-100-0 and was runner up in the 2007 Silver State Classic 0-200-0.

Guy Martin's appearance in the 2016 Open Road Challenge with his Ford Transit was a subject of his television documentary series Speed with Guy Martin.

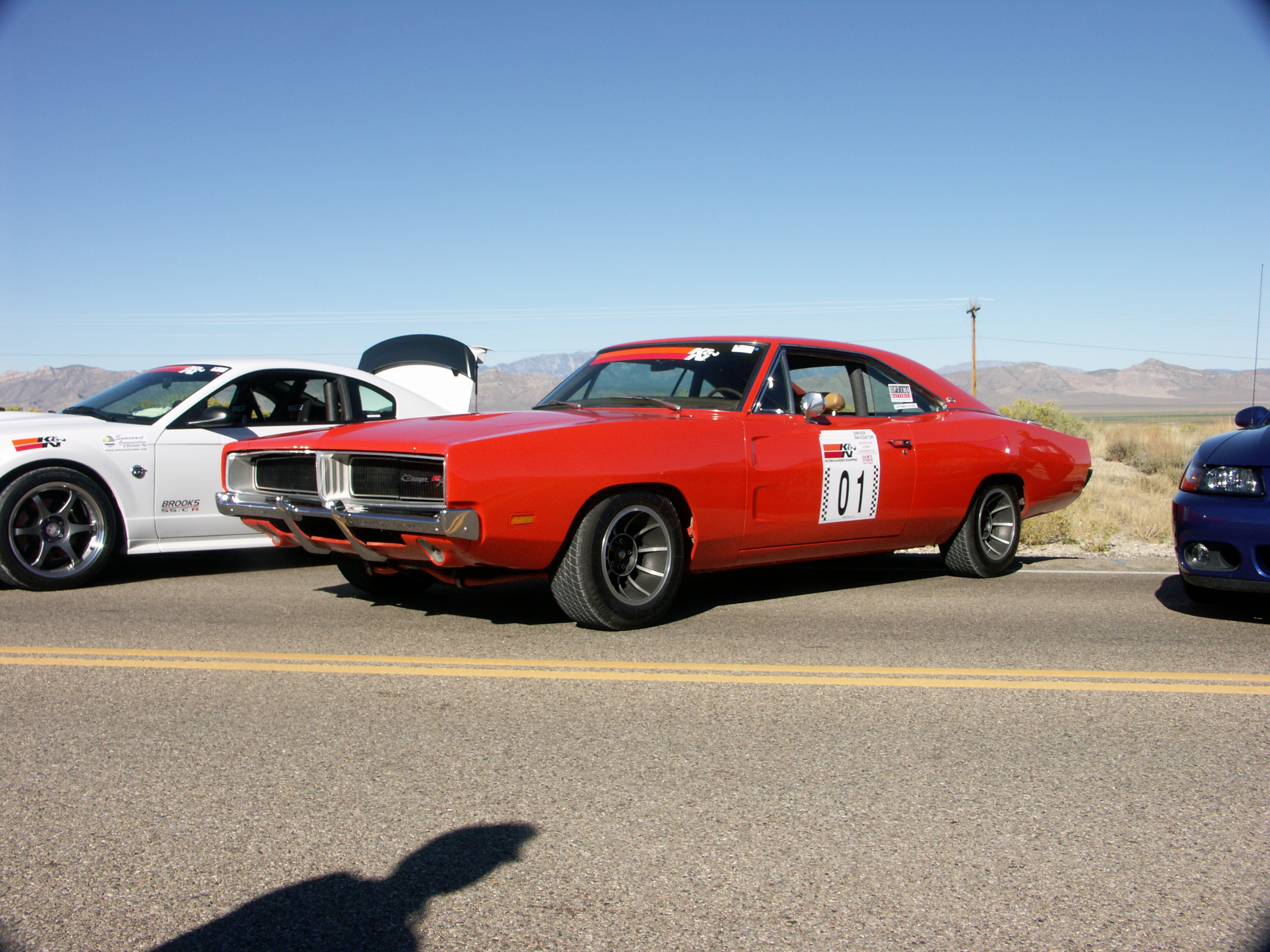
General Lee

== Notable cars ==
=== Big Red Camaro ===
"Big Red" is the first pro-touring American muscle car and the first Silver State Classic Unlimited-class winner. The car was built in 1987 by R. J. and Dan Gottlieb and crew using a 1969 Chevrolet Camaro for the main platform. The power came from a 540c.i. Lingenfelter-built, all aluminum Donovan big-block Chevrolet V8 making 750 lb-ft of torque and 800 horsepower. R. J. and crew went on to set the record for the Unlimited class of 197.99 mph (318.63 km/h). The original car was destroyed in an accident in the La Carrera road race as the chassis proved unable to handle the high power output. The second car was designed and built by Bill Osborne with a spaceframe tube chassis. Big Red was retired to a car museum in Laughlin, Nevada in 1996, and was revived for racing again in 2004 with a complete overhaul and restoration of the entire car.

== Similar events ==
Two other Open Road Racing events happen annually in the U.S. the Big Bend Open Road Racing organization happens in West Texas every April, and the Sandhills Open Road Challenge happens in Arnold, Nebraska every August.
