= Manabu Suzuki =

Manabu Suzuki (Shinjitai: 鈴木 学, Suzuki Manabu; born Tokyo, Japan, March 20, 1963) is a former racing driver, journalist, sport announcer and radio and TV presenter for the automotive industry. He is a Japanese citizen and is nicknamed Mana-P (マナP in katakana).

Suzuki competed in the Formula Toyota and Saurus Cup until the mid nineties. When he left circuit racing behind, he became well known for working with Option as a writer and presenter for the magazine's offshoot video magazine, Video Option and Drift Tengoku.

Suzuki was best known as one of the three original key judges (the other being Keiichi Tsuchiya and Manabu Orido, which Orido left at the end of the 2004 season to compete for 2005, while Tsuchiya left D1 with Daijro Inada due to irresponsible management) in the D1 Grand Prix series. He adds many comic expressions during commentary to keep the crowds entertained during the races. He also hosts various issues of the Option DVD where he is discussing cars. He often exclaims "giri giri", which means "little little" in Japanese. This phrase is used to express an instance where the "drift" is extremely close or a driver is almost in a position where he/she is going to crash.

Suzuki is also involved in car designs, appearing on a segment in Drift Tengoku on DIY graphics and even working on the paint scheme and decals for Orido's 2005 RS*R Toyota Supra JZA80 and Yasuyuki Kazama's 2006 DG-5 Nissan Silvia S15.
