= Open-road racing =

Form of rally car racing

Open-road racing is a form of regularity rally carried out at high speeds on closed public highways, most commonly in sparsely populated parts of the Southwestern United States. Competitors attempt to set specified average speeds which can range from 80 to 150 mph (130 to 240 km/h) or higher along courses ranging between 50 and 110 miles (80 and 180 km) in length. At the lower speeds, unmodified production cars can be used, while straightforward safety modifications can permit powerful sports cars to reach speeds of 165 mph (266 km/h).

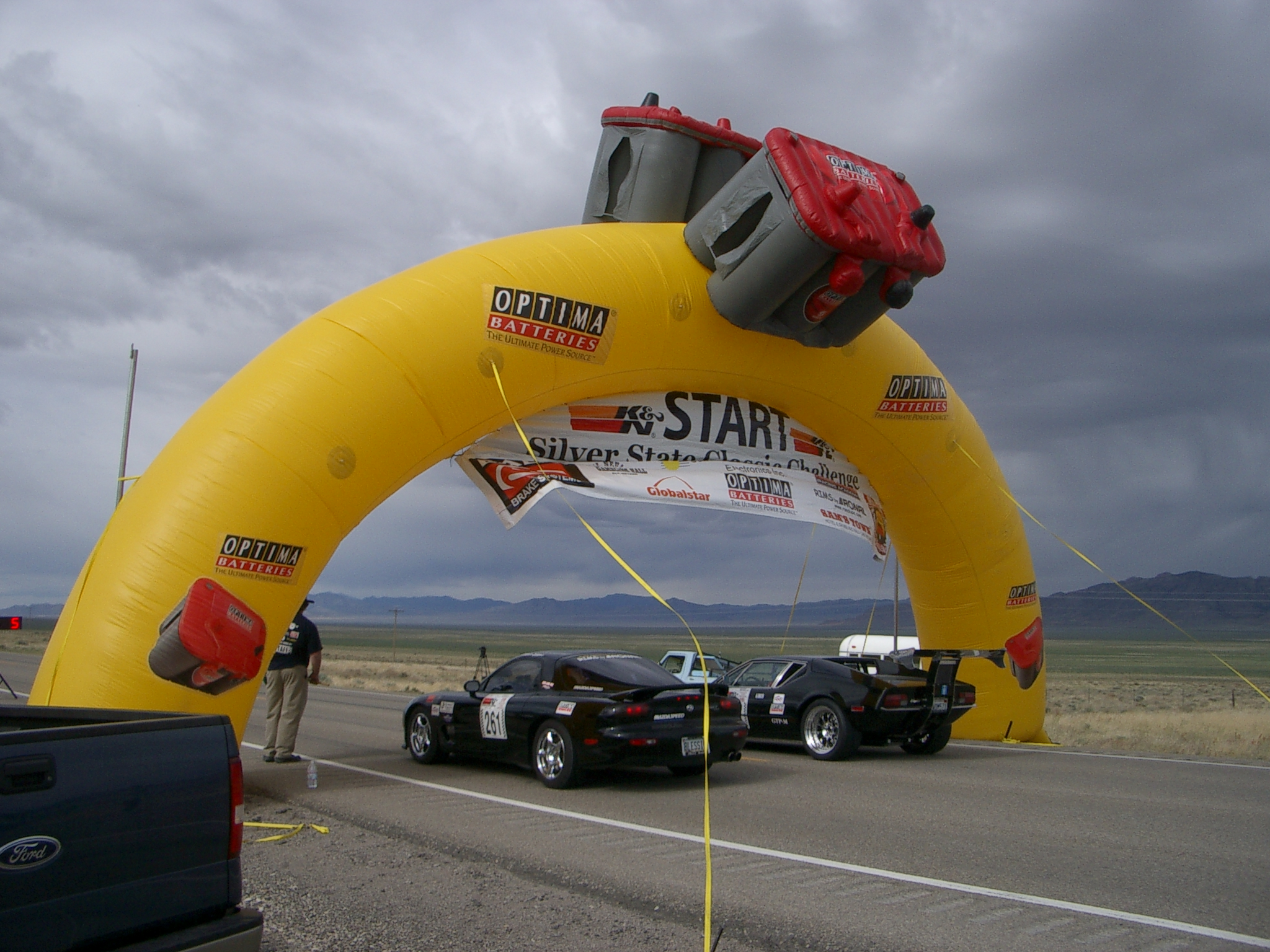
Start of the 2006 Silver State Classic Challenge

== History ==
Open Road Racing (ORR) marks a return to the earliest forms of motorsport, in which a public highway is closed down for amateur racers' use. Among the first motor races was the 1906 French Grand Prix, which was run on public roads near Le Mans. Similar types of races on public roads (not always closed off) continued until the 1950s, when a series of accidents in races like the Mille Miglia led to the abandonment of this type of racing.

A modified form of open road racing resumed in the 1980s, with the inception of the Silver State Classic Challenge in Nevada. Since then, a number of other events have been organized, including three events organized by MKM Promotions in Northern Nevada, at Wendover, Elko and Battle Mountain. Two races are run in West Texas each year: the Big Bend Open Road Race on U.S. Route 285 in April and the Road Runner event in October. Since 2001, the Sandhills Open Road Race in Arnold, Nebraska has been run every August.

== Example rules and entry requirements ==
All these organizations have similar rules and regulations. Drivers and optional navigators compete to set a specified average speed ("Target Speed") over the measured course, which is typically 50–90 miles in length. The start and finish time for each car is recorded against a GPS clock, and the average speed is calculated from the elapsed time. In each speed class, the winners are driver and navigator to achieve the speed closest to their target speed. Speed classes are chosen by the driver, with constraints according to their racing experience, the performance potential of their car, and the safety requirements set by the organizers.

As an example, in the Silver State Classic Challenge there are currently four main classes, in which cars can achieve target speeds between 95 and 180 mph. The classes specify safety equipment levels required for cars, drivers and navigators, and a maximum "Tech Speed", which may never be exceeded. Radar traps are hidden along the course to enforce this rule. There is also an Unlimited Class, in which drivers compete to set the fastest possible time over the course.

=== Touring (Speed classes: 95, 100, 105, 110 mph) ===
Stock street cars with regular 3-point seatbelts may be run in this class. A handheld fire extinguisher must be fitted, while gloves and Snell approved motorsports helmets must be worn by drivers and navigators. First-time drivers must run in this class unless they have appropriate motorsports experience. At no time may the car exceed the Tech Speed of 124 mph.

=== Grand Touring (Speed classes: 115, 120, 125 mph) ===
In addition to a handheld fire extinguisher, gloves and Snell helmets, the car must be fitted with 5-point or 6-point harnesses for the driver and navigator (if present). Open cars must have a rollbar fitted. At no time may the car exceed the Tech Speed of 140 mph.

=== Grand Sport (Speed classes: 130, 135, 140, 145, 150 mph) ===
In addition to the above equipment, all cars must be fitted with a rollbar or equivalent roll-over protection. Drivers and navigators must wear fireproof racing suits. At no time may the car exceed the Tech Speed of 168 mph (270 km/h) (the speed rating of ZR tires).

=== Super Sport (Speed classes: 155, 160, 170, 180 mph, and Unlimited) ===
In this class, specialist race cars are necessary. A full roll cage, fuel cell and onboard plumbed fire extinguisher are required. Cars in the 160 and 170 mph speed classes may not exceed the Tech Speed of 180 mph at any time. Cars in the 180 mph and Unlimited classes have no specified maximum speed.

== See also ==
- Street circuit
