= Jeffrey E Schwartz =

American car builder

Jeff Schwartz
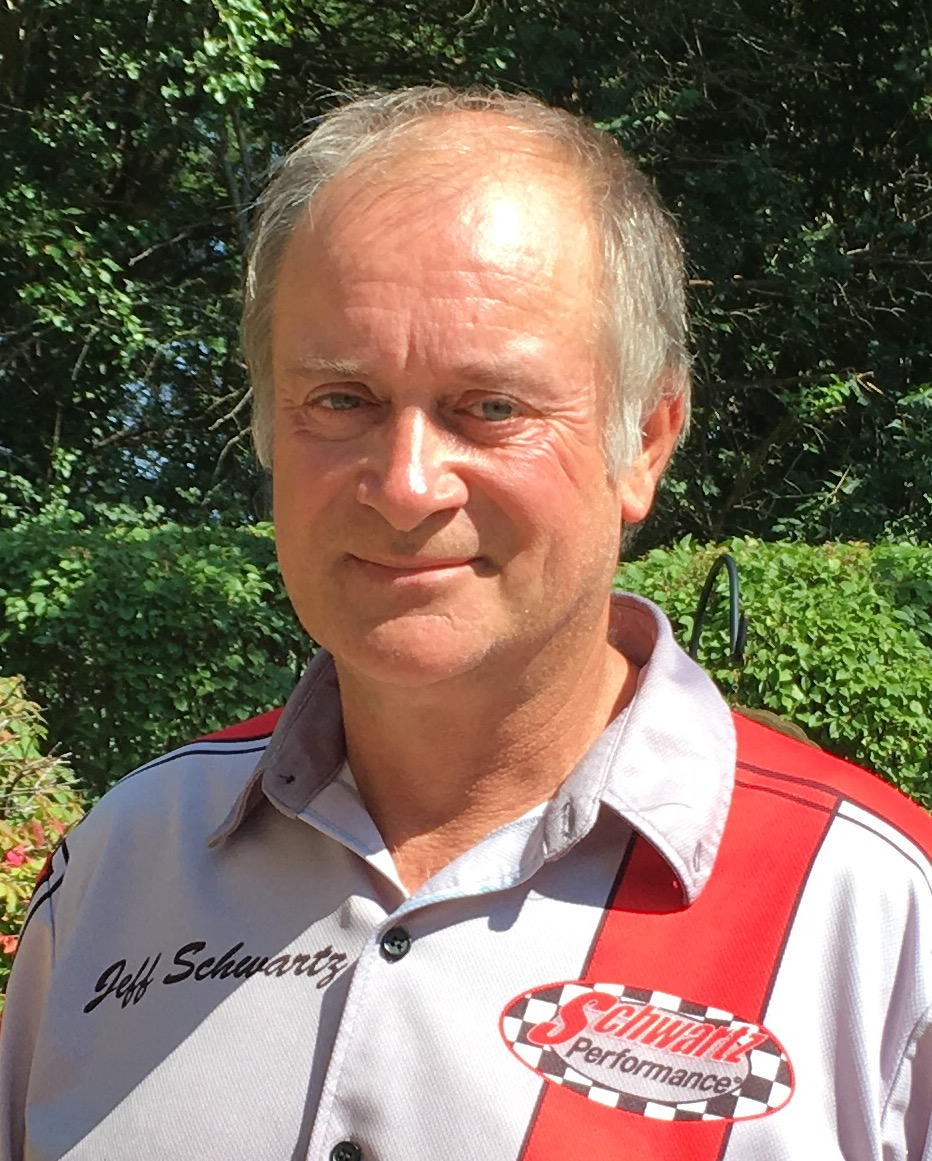
- Schwartz in 2017
- Born: June 12, 1958 (age 68); Bemidji, Minnesota, United States
- Occupations: Customizer of ProTouring Custom Cars and Manufacturer of G-Machine Chassis, Owner of Schwartz Performance, Founder of the Schwartz Motocross History Museum
- Website: schwartzperformance.comschwartzmuseum.org

Jeff Schwartz is an American protouring car builder/designer and former professional road racer who brought to market the first Bolt-in Muscle Car Chassis for GM A-body cars. In his modified and equipped cars, Schwartz is a six-time winner of the Car Craft Magazine's Real Street Eliminator competition with his fifth and sixth win at the ProAm Invitational in Milwaukee, WI in 2015. In 2013, Schwartz won "Popular Hot Rodding Magazine's Muscle Car of the Year" with his 1981 Twin Turbo TransAm and was voted Car Craft Magazine's "Pro-Builder of the Year" with Jake Wallace's Twin Turbo 1967 Chevy Malibu. In 2017, Schwartz and his crew won his second Car Craft Pro-Builder Award with a right hand drive 1970 Cuda. He is the owner of Schwartz Performance in Harvard, IL, the founder of the Schwartz Motocross History Museum in McHenry County, IL and the father of two children.

== Racing ==
Jeffrey Elmer Schwartz was born on June 12, 1958, in Bemidji, Minnesota, to Dale Elmer Schwartz and Patricia (Leseman) Schwartz. A lifelong automobile and motorcycle enthusiast, Schwartz subscribed to Hot Rod Magazine and learned to weld when he was 12 years old. He went on to become an accomplished machinist with an extensive career in manufacturing and product design. Spending most of his career managing automotive parts and equipment manufacturing plants, Schwartz raced whenever possible.

Schwartz started his racing career as a Motocross rider in the 1970s. Competing in an average of 36 American Motorcyclist Association (AMA) sanctioned events per year, Schwartz won awards on Puch and Monark motorcycles that were modified and equipped with his own custom designed long travel suspension systems. His competitive automobile racing began in 1979 when Schwartz won the National Council of Corvette Club Midwest Regional Championship both in Overall Points and Speed in his first year of competition. In the 80's, his professional road racing put Schwartz in control of various race cars from four and six-cylinder front-wheel-drive Sport Compacts to V8-powered GT1 Corvettes and IMSA Camaros. Throughout the 1982 Central Division race season, Schwartz was inspired by Jerry Hansen, the father of TV Host and personality Courtney Hansen, to adopt a more refined racing style noting Hanson's aggressive but smooth style. Schwartz continued on to win numerous races, including the June Sprints, setting a new Showroom Stock B record at Road America, set 5 SCCA National Track records and be named the 1982 SCCA Chicago Region "Rookie Driver of the Year".

Schwartz's 1982 SCCA year was highlighted by earning pole position at the SCCA National Championship Run offs in which Schwartz, as Tom Mulhern wrote, "turned some heads with his performance, especially considering he was the only rookie in the field of 18 drivers from across the country" but lost due to mechanical failure. He was featured in several Goodyear Tire magazine ads and in 1983 moved to IMSA Pro Races, setting fastest race laps, leading and finishing on the podium at several events and receiving more public exposure. Late 1983, Schwartz earned a spot in the Renault Elf Winfield Racing School at Circuit Paul Ricard in France to try out for a full-time ride with Renault Racing in Europe. Losing his chance by two-tenths of a second, Schwartz was the USA group runner-up for the ride that was ultimately earned by Gerhard Berger, who went on to Formula One Racing fame.

== Pro-touring-car building ==
With the evolution of the automobile aftermarket industry and technologies, Schwartz realized that race car performance no longer required an uncomfortable feel. He proved his idea in 2002 with his home built 1982 Cadillac Fleetwood Brougham that handled like a sports car. In the "Cadillac Attack", Schwartz won his first Car Craft Magazine's 2002 Real Street Eliminator competition with the fastest trap speed, fastest autocross time, and quickest ET against Camaros, Dodge Vipers and Corvettes. With his second home built car, the Ultima GTR, he won the 2006 Silver State Classic Challenge 0-200 mph-0 (Z2Z) against RJ and Dan Gottlieb's notable Big Red Camaro, among others, set a record for fastest 0-100-0, and was runner up in the 2007 Silver State Classic 0-200-0.

== Schwartz performance and chassis manufacturing ==
In 2003, Schwartz lost his job as Manufacturing Plant Manager due to corporate restructuring. After building custom cars and motorcycles as a hobby for 26 years, many of which had been seen in major magazines, Schwartz set out on a path to put his passions to work. Because Schwartz had built cars in his home garage like the ‘82 Cadillac Fleetwood Brougham that were competitive with track prepared sports cars and the 1002 horsepower street legal Schwartz Ultima GTR kit car that attained magazine and TV coverage, when Schwartz opened his business in 2004, he had earned enough recognition for his first opportunity to work a concept car by Jimi Day and Murray Pfaff, Rick Weis’ Poison Dart.

In 2006, Schwartz brought to market the First Bolt-in Muscle Car chassis for the GM A-Body 1964 Chevelle known as the Schwartz G-Machine A-body Chassis. He then immediately followed with the First Bolt-in full frame for Unibody cars. Schwartz has since developed and improved upon over 20 track-tested chassis designs to work in 25 models of GM, Ford and Mopar cars and trucks.

Debuting at the 2012 Car Craft Pro-Builder shootout, Schwartz' 1981 Twin Turbo Trans Am, dubbed the "Full Force Trans Am" due to its Full Frame and Forced induction, was built for himself and showcased the pairing of a Schwartz Full Frame Chassis and its handling capability with the high-horsepowered performance of a Schwartz modified engine. The ’81 TransAm featured a Schwartz G-Machine full chassis, Schwartz 1300 hp Twin Turbo 6.9 liter engine and was topped with a "one of a kind" bird, designed by Murray Pfaff.

In 2013, Schwartz's '81 Trans Am was the runner up in the Car Craft Real Street Eliminator and won the Popular Hot Rodding Muscle Car of the Year Shoot-Out. In the same year, Schwartz was voted the CAR CRAFT "Pro-Builder of the Year" with Jake Wallace's Twin Turbo 1967 Chevy Malibu.

Known as a master when it comes to rebuilding classic vehicles that are engineered to handle a road course, Brake Parts Inc., the manufacturer of Raybestos Brakes, commissioned Schwartz to build several of their Giveaway Cars. Partnering with Schwartz for their 1971 Raybestos Camaro build the Raybestos Camaro was the runner-up for both the 2014 Car Craft Muscle Car of the Year Shootout and the 2014 Real Street Eliminator Their 2nd build, a 1969 Raybestos FastBack Mustang. was given away at the AAPEX show in Las Vegas in 2016. In 2017, Raybestos teamed up with Schwartz for a 3rd time for a 1953 Chevy Pick-Up Truck Build.

== Motocross Bike Preservation ==
In 2016, Schwartz founded the Schwartz Motocross History Museum which is dedicated to the preservation and education of Motocross history. With his extensive collection of 1970s bikes from around the world, Schwartz is an active member in the vintage motocross bike restoration and racing community.
