= Import scene =

Car subculture

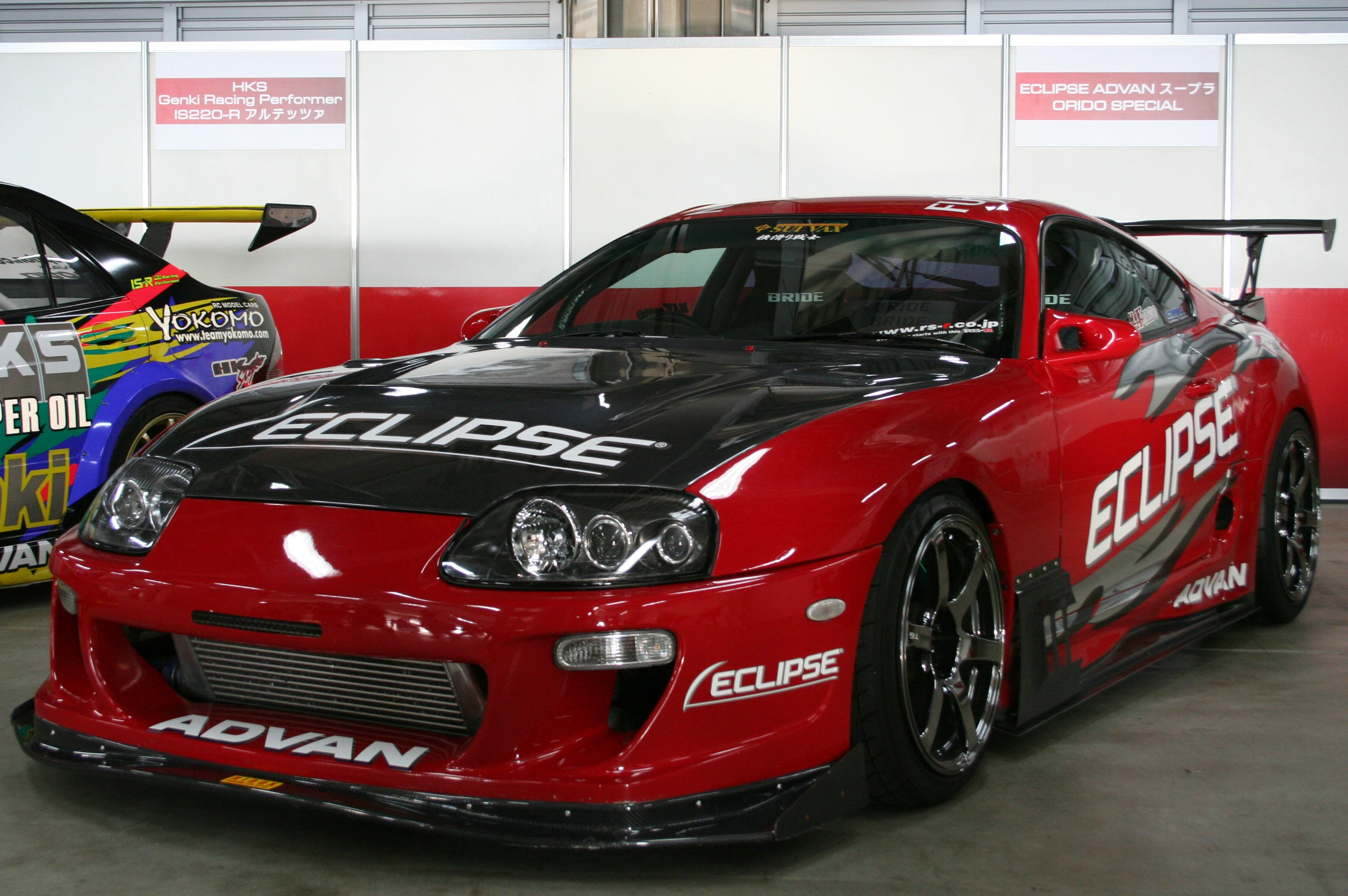
Modified Toyota Supra A80

The import scene, also known as the import racing scene or tuner scene, is a subculture of modifying mostly Japanese-import cars, particularly in the United States and Europe.

== History ==
Car modifying has been popular among youths in the US, especially in Southern California, since the days of hot rods in the 1950s and 1960s and muscle cars in the 1970s. There is significant evidence indicating that import drag racing first started in Southern California in the mid-1960s, with modified Volkswagen Beetles, Ford Populars and Austin A40 Devons: Documentation of quarter-mile passes were published in Hot Rod Magazine as early as August 1965.

Puerto Rico also has a history of pioneering import drag racing in the mid-'70s and -'80s, and it is still a popular hobby on the island.

In the late 1970s and early 1980s, Japanese vehicles, mostly early smaller Hondas (Civic, Prelude), Toyotas (Celica, Corolla, Supra), Nissans (Datsun 510) and Mazdas (RX-2, RX-3) gained popularity in Southern California. To be more precise, within the city of "Gardena" at a parking lot (location) for then what was called "Meiji (Japanese) Market or Meiji Market Plaza" along with a line of other authentic Japanese retailers serving the largely Japanese communities of Gardena, Torrance, and Palos Verdes was to become the " 1st known and established Weekend late-night meet-up location."

The young Asian-Americans and first generation "Issei" Japanese street racers from Japan and Okinawa played a particularly important role in the development of the early street racing scene. Many enthusiasts in southern California centered around the City of Gardena also began to modify their compact Japanese cars, following similar trends that originated in Japan, such as the paint schemes, modified exhausts, and engine carburation. As the import racers and car aesthetics grew in popularity and numbers, so did the competition. Meiji Market's parking lot became very well known outside the original Japanese car crews and this attracted more outsiders to visit, as well as American Car race Crews to appear. Non-Japanese automobile racers & car clubs started to appear from far outside the Gardena, Torrance, & South Bay communities and in approx. by around 1983 to 1986. In 1973, the Japanese issei began to bring the style of Japanese styled cars over to the U.S.

Cars such as the Datsun 510, Toyota Corolla, and the Honda Civic along with other modified vehicles.

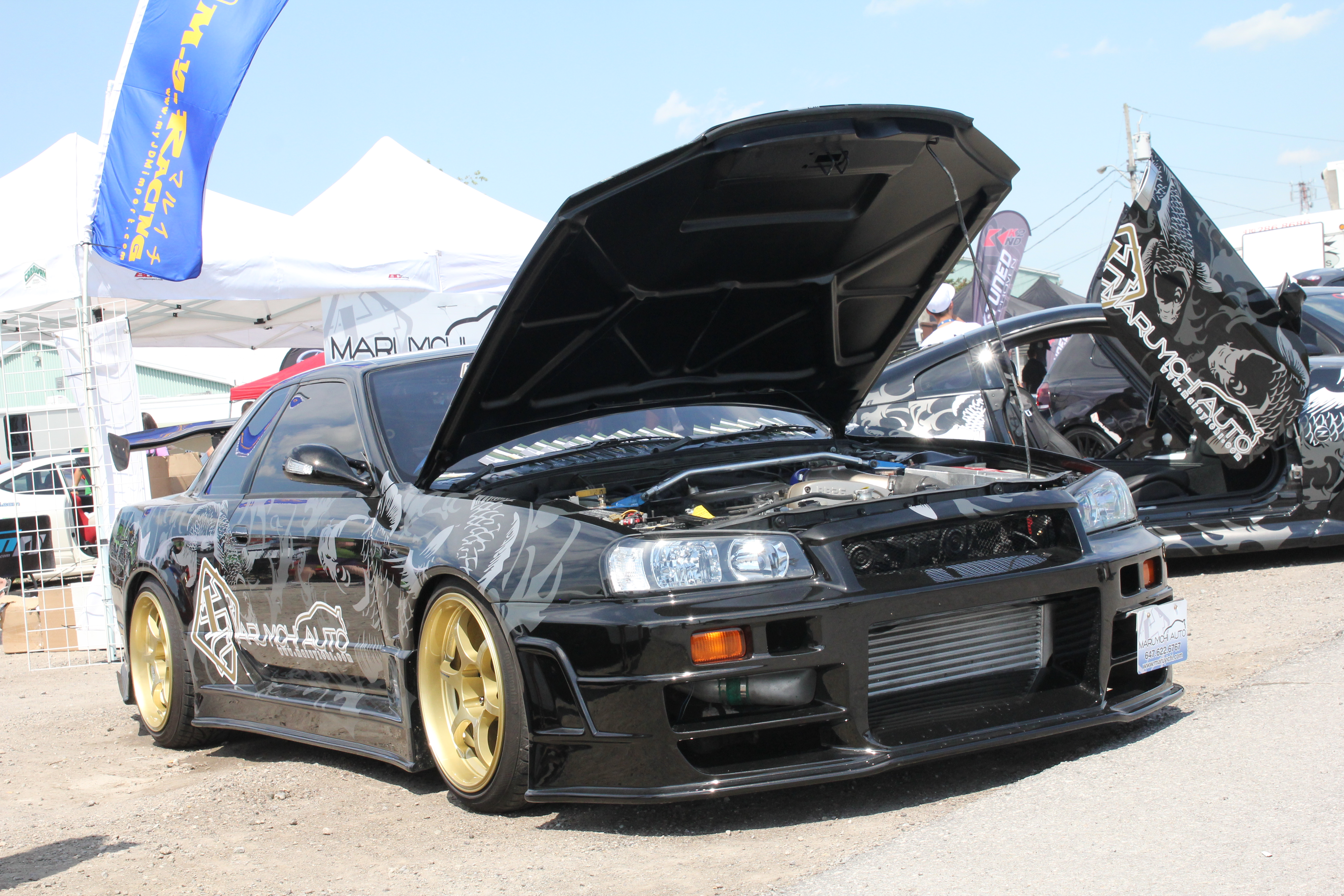
Modified Nissan R32 Skyline GT-R at Importexpo 2011

The import scene grew exponentially in the 1990s and 2000s with more Japanese imports internationally, better performance, and media and cultural influences such as the Fast & Furious film series and Need for Speed video games.

Street Import racing venues and street meet-up locations in nearby cities such as Carson, Ca. and Long Beach, Ca. eventually arose from the original Meiji Market Location, and then came huge drag racing events at Palmdale, California often packed in over 10,000 spectators per day. Racers like Stephan Papadakis, Ed Bergenholtz, Myles Bautista, Lisa Kubo, and Eric Sebastian on the West Coast dominated the first import drag racing circuit IDRC (Battle of the Imports) in the mid 1990s. Show car clubs became a huge factor within the import scene: Southern California had Team Macross 7, Team Outkast, Team Kosoku, Northern California had SVP, Sinister Racing, Team Flipspeed, Team Light*Speed Racing. in the East Coast (New Jersey, Toronto). In the South, Team Himitsujigen and Team Dangerous (Texas) and Team Hawaii had Midnight Racing and Alpha Project which won numerous car shows all over the island of Oahu. Special thanks to the crews at Distinctive, GX Auto, Progressive Auto Sounds, P.A.T.S, Sonic Motorsports, Midnight Tinting, Kaizo Speed Gear, Architechs, Hypersports Racing, Speedline, HDS, Hawaii Raceway Park and AugustKinetics. Guam had teams like Lowered 2 Perfection and Toys R Us, while the East Coast had the still-active Jade Crew.

The Japanese racing scene can be seen in the anime series Initial D, which focuses mainly on mountain pass-racing and Wangan Midnight which deals with high-speed expressway racing.
