= Nissan Micra =

Supermini car produced by Nissan

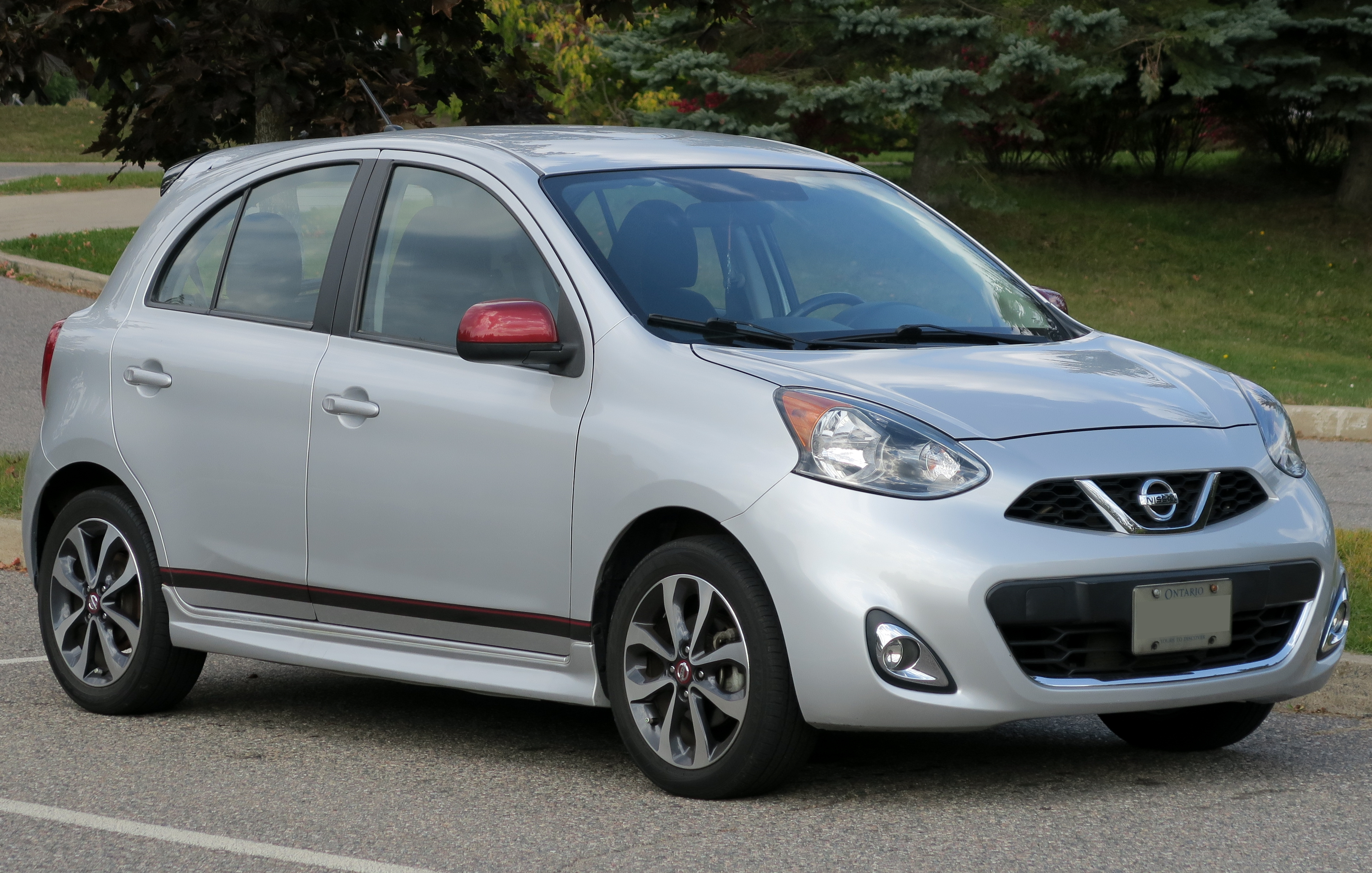
- Fourth-generation Micra (K13)

Overview
- Manufacturer: Nissan
- Also called: Nissan March (until K13 model); Datsun Micra (1983–1984)
- Production: 1982–present

Body and chassis
- Class: Supermini (B)

Chronology
- Predecessor: Nissan Cherry (Japan)

The Nissan Micra, also known as the Nissan March (Japanese: 日産・マーチ, Hepburn: Nissan Māchi), is a supermini car (B-segment) that has been produced by the Japanese automobile manufacturer Nissan from 1982. The March name has always been used in the Japanese markets but also in many export markets across Asia and Latin America and others.

The Nissan Micra/March partially replaced the Nissan Cherry. It was exclusive to the Nissan Japanese dealership network Nissan Cherry Store until 1999 when the Cherry network was combined into Nissan Red Stage until 2003. Until Nissan began selling kei cars in Japan, the March was Nissan's smallest vehicle there. Unlike most Nissans in the domestic market, it was never sold under other names through other distribution chains.

== First generation (K10; 1982) ==
First generation
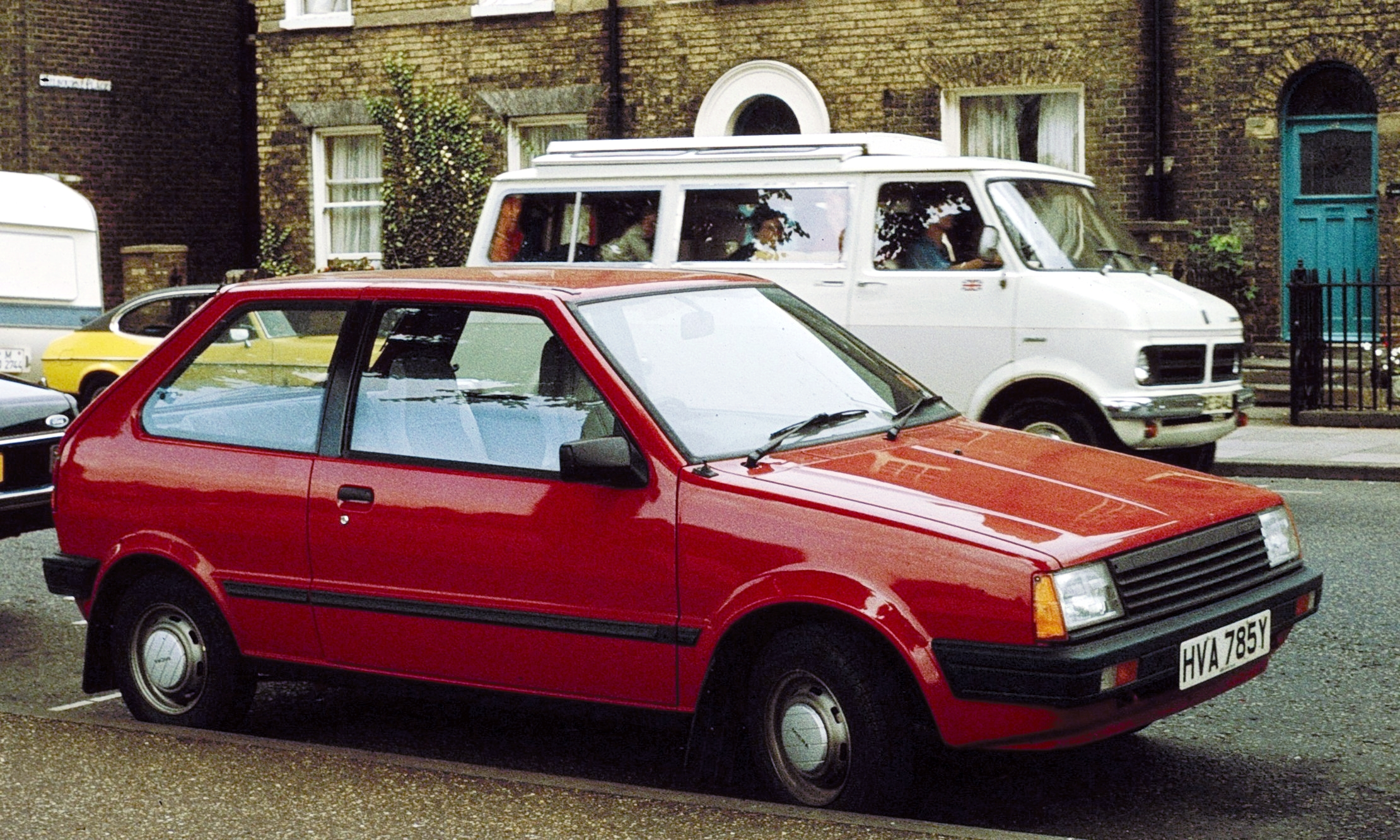
- K10 (Original version)

Overview
- Model code: K10
- Also called: Datsun Micra (1982–1984); Nissan March
- Production: October 1982 – December 1992
- Model years: 1983–1992
- Assembly: Japan: Oppama Plant, Yokosuka, Kanagawa
- Designer: Naganori Ito

Body and chassis
- Body style: 3 and 5-door hatchback
- Layout: Front-engine, front-wheel-drive
- Related: Nissan Figaro; Nissan Be-1; Nissan Pao

Powertrain
- Engine: 930 cc MA09ERT twincharger I4; 987 cc MA10S I4; 1235 cc MA12S I4
- Transmission: 4- or 5-speed manual 3-speed automatic

Dimensions
- Wheelbase: 2,300 mm (90.6 in)
- Length: 3,785 mm (149.0 in)
- Width: 1,560 mm (61.4 in)
- Height: 1,395 mm (54.9 in)
- Curb weight: 635 kg (1,400 lb)

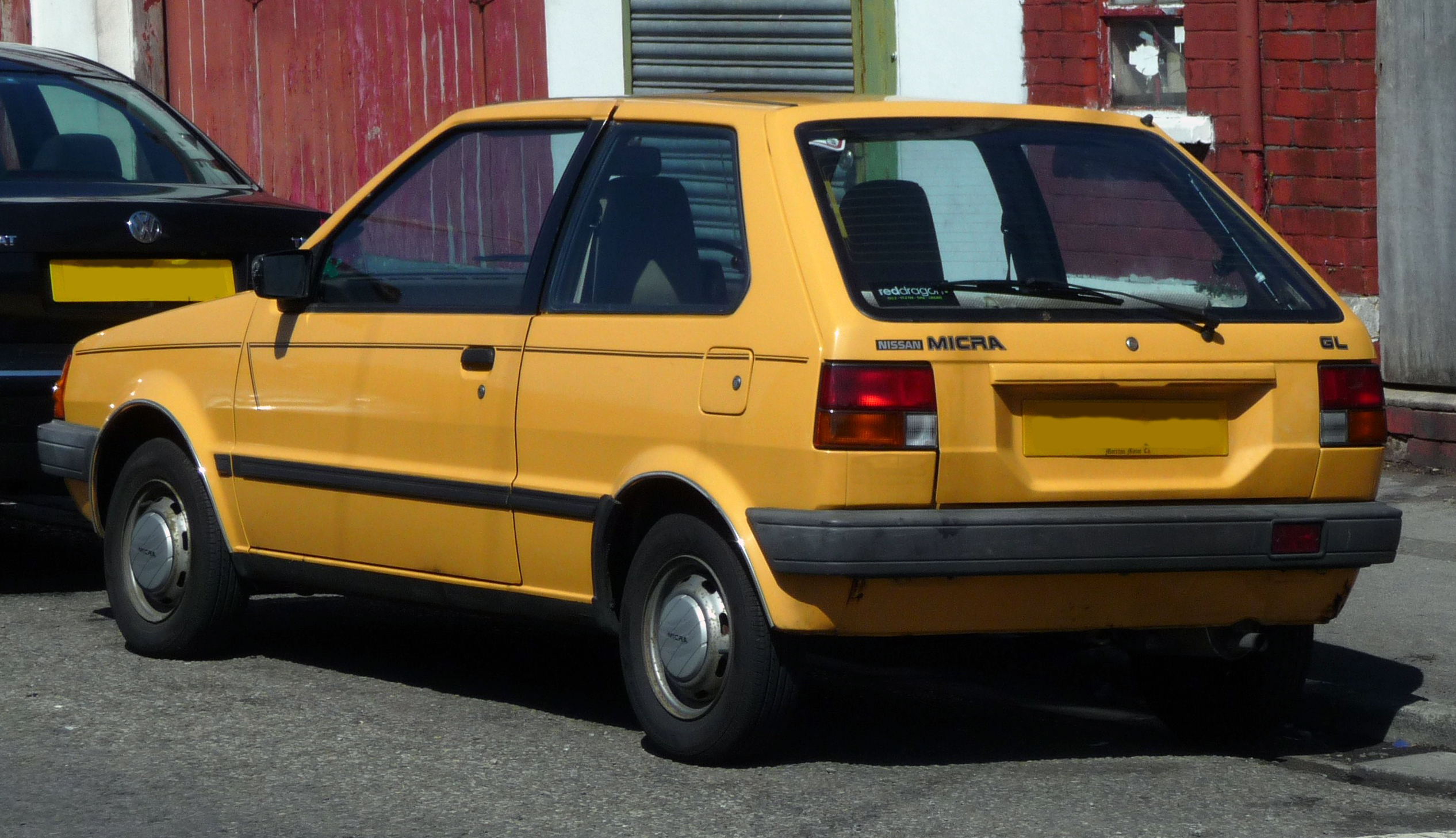
An early Micra showing the original pre-85.5 model year tailgate design

The original March (chassis name K10) was introduced onto the Japanese market in October 1982 as a challenger to the Honda City, Daihatsu Charade, Suzuki Cultus, and Toyota Starlet. It was intended to replace the Nissan Cherry as the company's competitor in the supermini sector, as the Cherry model had progressively become larger with each successive generation. In Japan, it was exclusive to Nissan Cherry store locations, benefiting from engineering contributions from Nissan's 1966 acquisition of the Prince Motor Company, who originally developed the outgoing Cherry. The car was sold as the Micra in Europe; it had particularly low fuel consumption made possible by a specially developed engine only used in the March/Micra, uncommonly high gearing and a particularly low weight of 630 kg (1,389 lb) in early European trim. The low weight target necessitated a minimum of insulation, meaning that early Micras were quite loud. Japanese owners benefitted from an engine below 1000 cc when it came time to pay the annual road tax obligation.

The body style was originally designed for Fiat as a replacement for the Fiat 127, but Fiat then adopted the Giugiaro-styled Uno instead. It was introduced in the European market in June 1983, and in Canada in 1984 for the 1985 model year (replacing the slightly larger Nissan Pulsar hatchbacks). Because the Micra was launched during Nissan's rebranding effort to systematically phase out the Datsun name, a small "Datsun" (ダットサン, Dattosan) appeared on the tailgate for the first two years, and in some European markets, the car was known as the "Datsun-Nissan Micra". The Datsun badges had disappeared completely by the end of 1984. The Micra was initially available with an extremely refined all-aluminium MA10S SOHC engine. European market cars developed 37 kW (50 PS) or 40 kW (55 PS) in the high compression version coupled with the five-speed option. It was also available with either a four-speed or five-speed automatic transmission (called "Nissanmatic"). Both the automatic and five-speed manual gearboxes were unusual in a supermini at this time. The Nissanmatic model originally had a 44 kW (60 PS) version of the 1-litre engine.

It was one of several important small cars to be launched onto the European market during 1983. Also launched that year were the Fiat Uno, Peugeot 205, Vauxhall Nova (a Britain-only model which had been launched across Europe the previous year as the Opel Corsa) and the second generation of the Ford Fiesta. It sold well in Britain, being launched there in June 1983 and peaking at more than 50,000 sales for the year in 1989, and was one of the most popular imported cars of its era. It was quietly discontinued in August 2023, and only the fourth-generation model remains in some markets.

=== Mid-model refresh ===
The model was revised in June 1985, identifiable by a restyled tailgate and larger rear lamp clusters. The Japanese market saw the debut of the first Micra Turbo/MA10ET, where Nissan grafted a turbocharger and added electronic fuel injection to the small 1.0 L engine. This version was never sold in Europe, where the only engines ever available were the 1.0 and 1.2 units. The 1.2, with the larger MA12 1.2 L engine with an electronically controlled carburettor with 42 kW (57 PS), arrived in late 1987. A non-catalyzed version produced 44 kW (60 PS). Another facelift came in March 1989, which consisted of some minor upgrades such as deeper bumpers, a new front grille, minor interior details, and headlight changes. This was also when the five-door hatchback version was introduced in Europe, shortly before Ford launched the third-generation Fiesta which also offered a 5-door model for the first time.

The Micra's chassis spawned a number of variations. The Be-1 (BK10), launched at the Tokyo Motor Show in 1985 (but not sold until 1987), was a limited-edition model with a more rounded bodyshape, and only 10,000 were sold. In 1987, the canvas-topped, retro-looking hatchback Pao (パオ) (PK10) was launched (also at the Tokyo Motor Show) and sold to the public in 1989; 51,657 units were sold. The canvas-topped Figaro (フィガロ) (FK10) coupé was unveiled at the same show in 1989, but not released until 1991. Because demand for the Figaro exceeded the 20,000 vehicles built, Nissan sold the car by lottery: winners could place orders for the car. Despite being a JDM-only model, the Figaro is one of the most imported models of the K10 derivatives; its popularity among numerous celebrity owners helped it earn cult status. The K10 ceased production on 21 December 1992, although its replacement had gone into production some months earlier.

During its lifetime, the Micra gained a good reputation for reliability and economy. In 1995, it topped the small car class in a reliability survey of four to six-year-old cars undertaken by the German Automobile Association (ADAC), with 7.5 recorded breakdowns per 1,000 vehicles for four-year-old Micras and 11.5 for six-year-old cars: this compared with 8.0 breakdowns per 1,000 cars for four-year-old Volkswagen Polos and 15.3 for six-year-old Polos. (The class loser was the Fiat Uno with 20.7 breakdowns per 1,000 for four-year-old cars and 37.3 for six-year-old Unos. In the longer term, the Micra would also go on to achieve a much higher survival rate than many of its competitors.)

For the 1991 model year, a rebadged Nissan Sentra B12 entered Canada to replace the Micra as the Nissan Sentra Classic after Nissan announced it would not import the Micra to Canada after 1991. The Sentra Classics were built in Mexico.

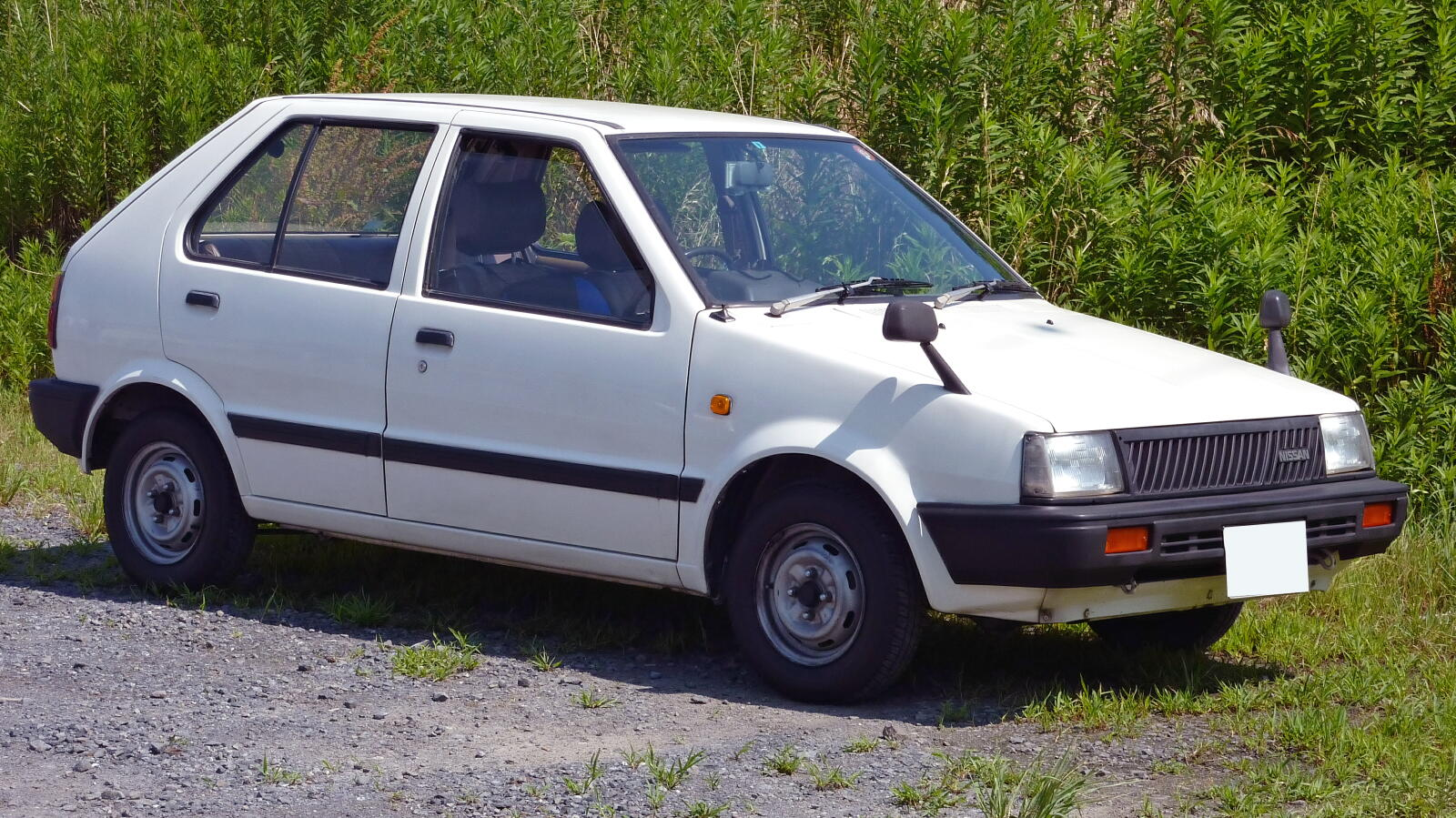
5-door pre-facelift Nissan Micra

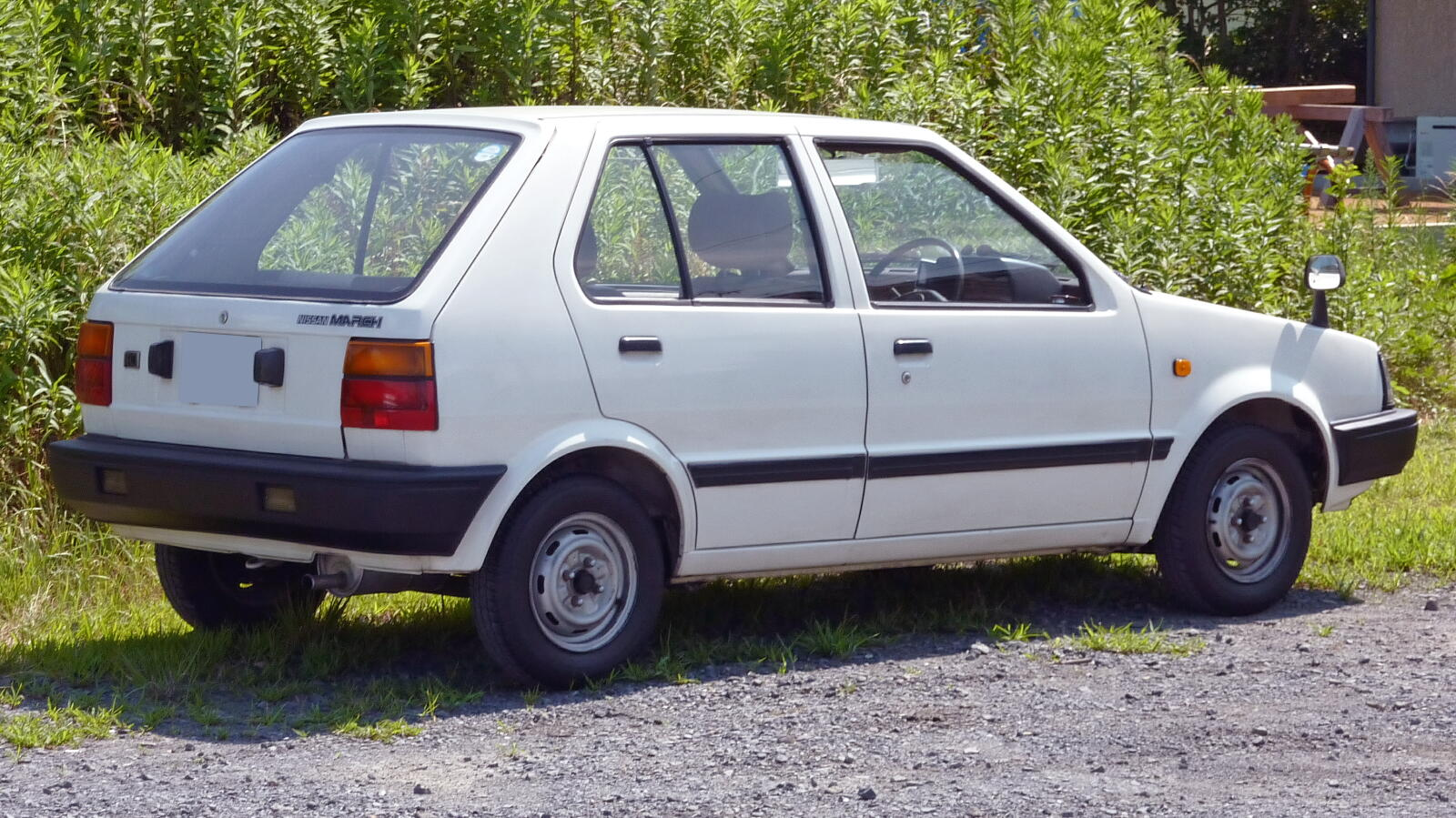
5-door pre-facelift Nissan Micra

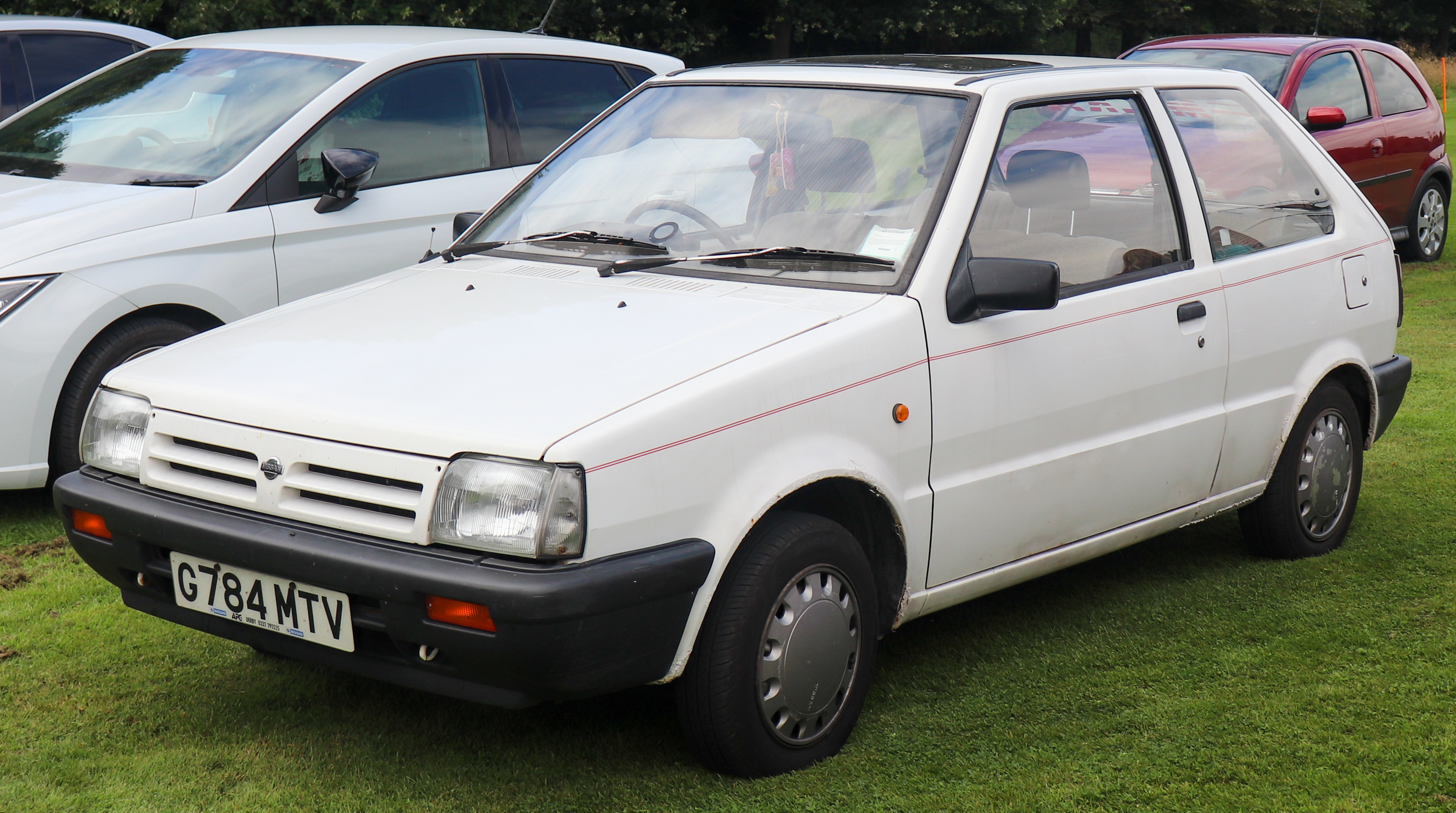
Facelift version (Europe, 1989–1992)

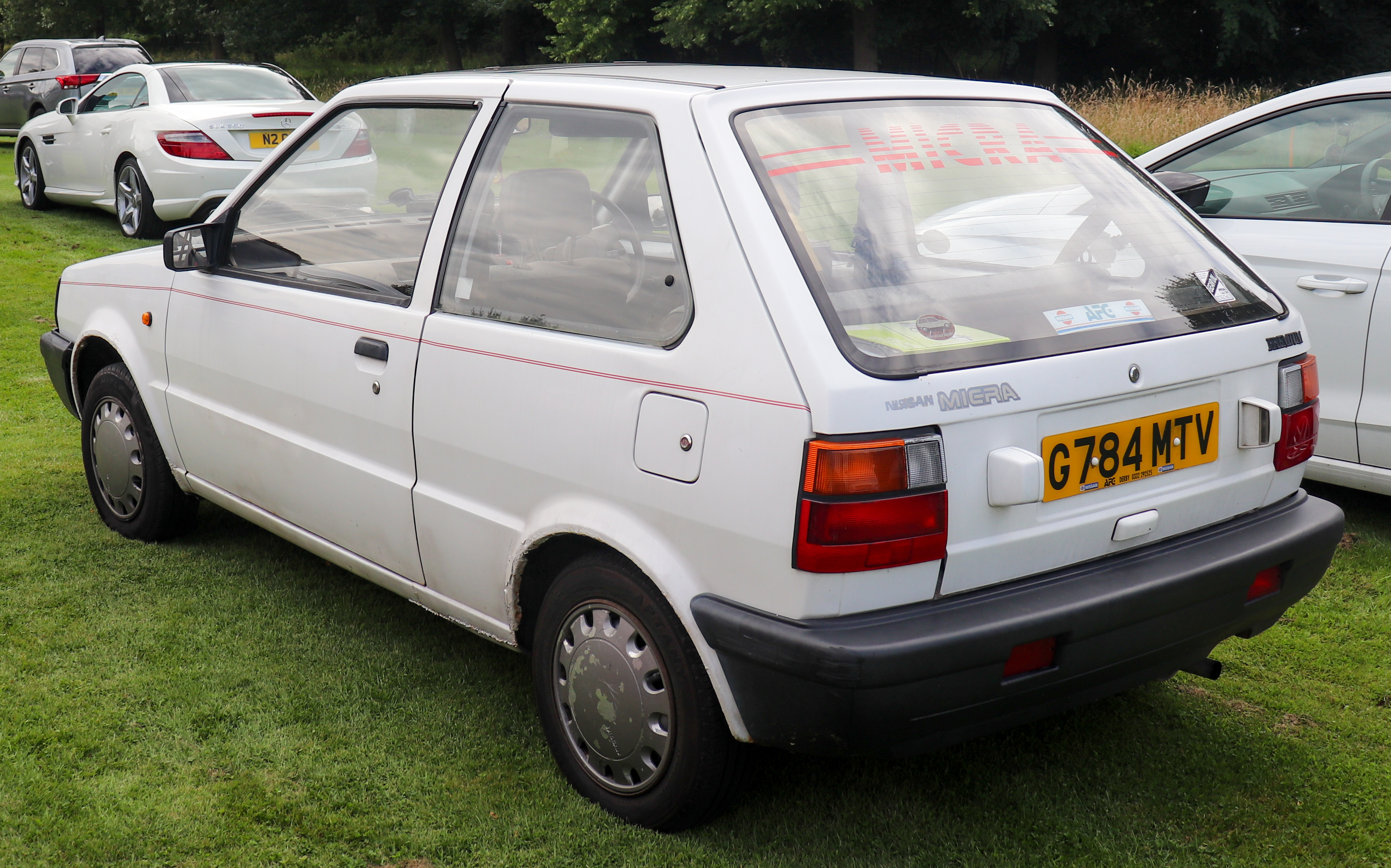
Facelift version (Europe, 1989–1992)

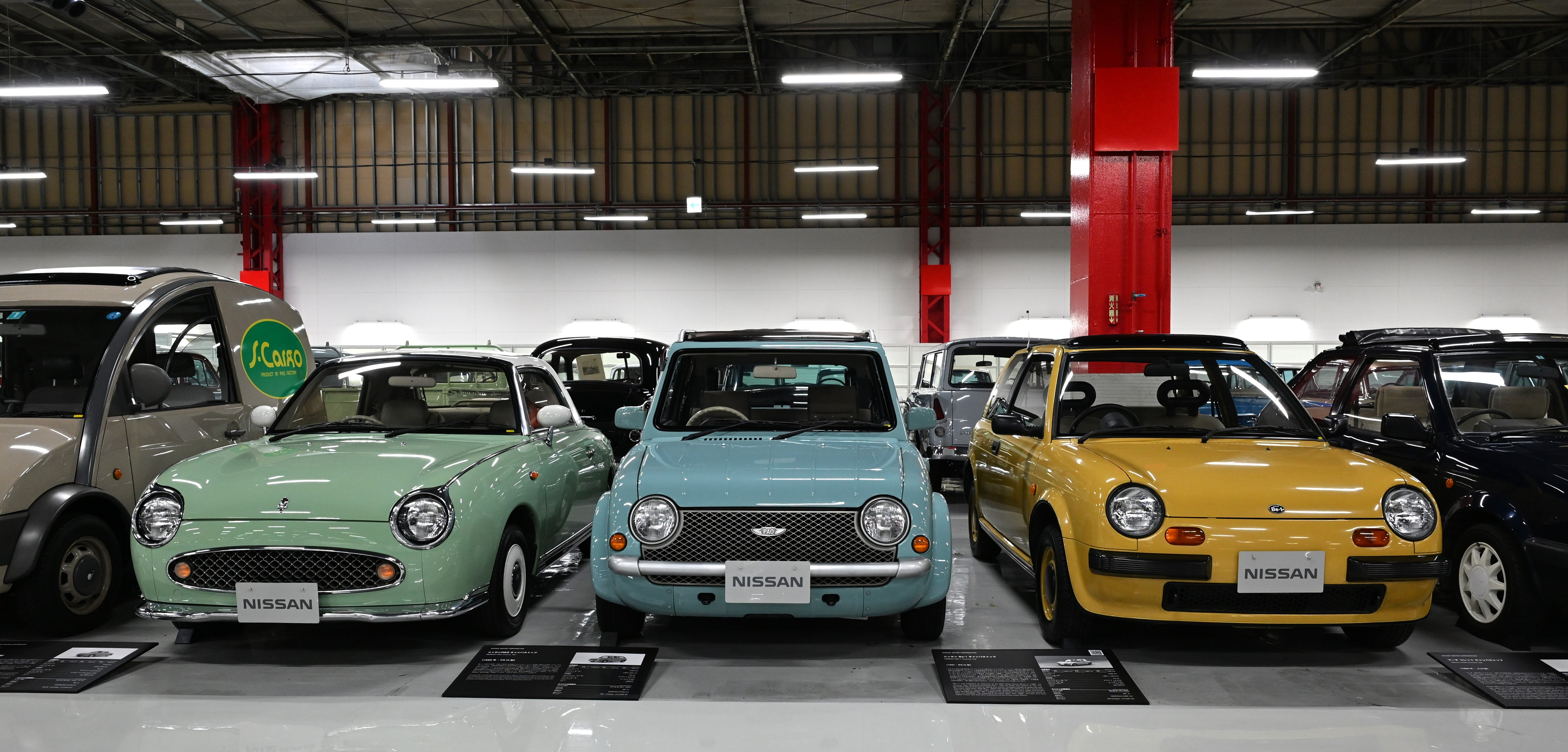
Pike car variations, Figaro, PAO, Be-1

=== Super S ===
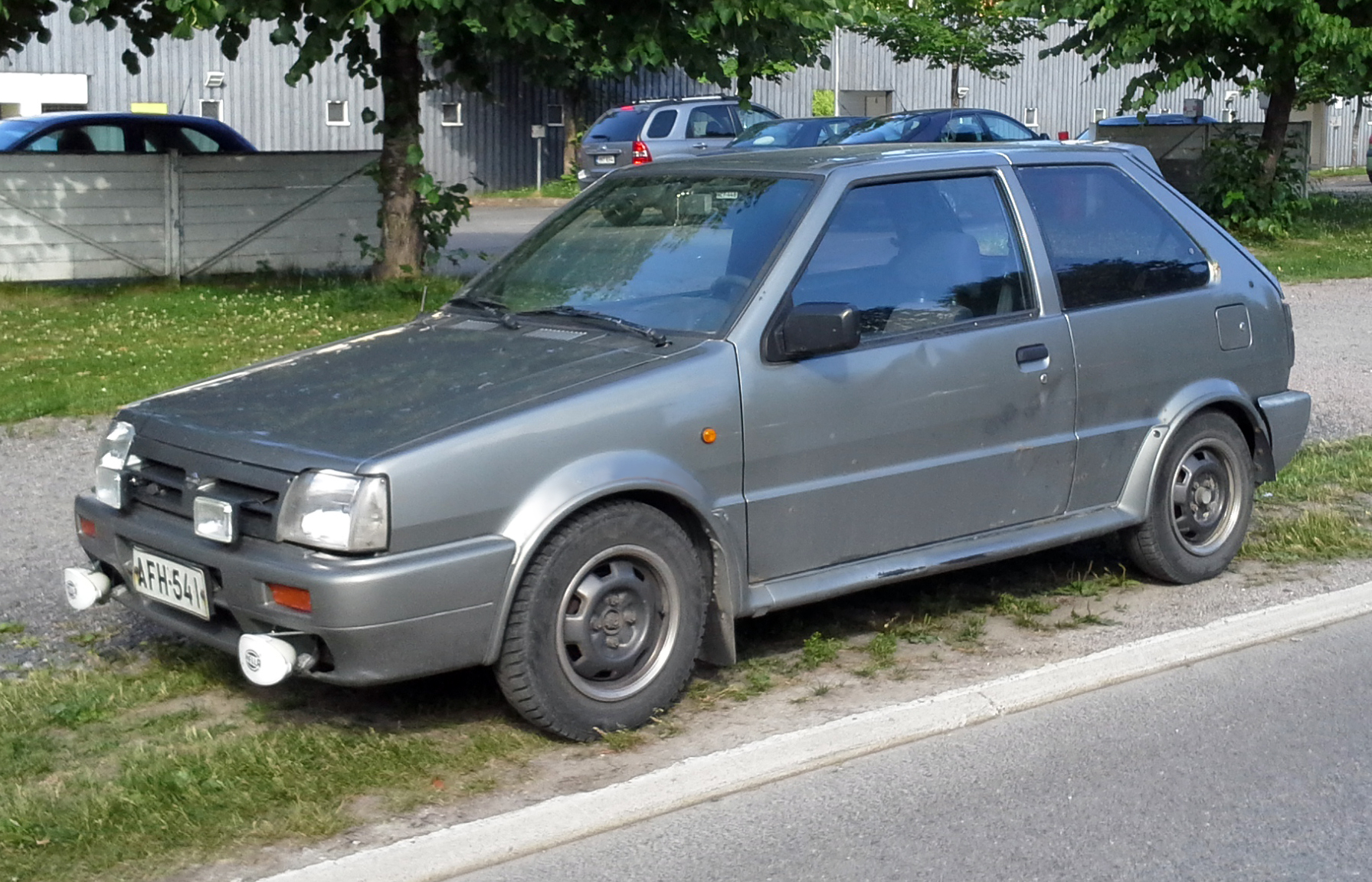
Micra Super S (Europe)

The European market Super S trim became available along with the second facelift in 1989. Sporty Super S included a factory body kit, racing seats and a tachometer and was only available in black, gray, white and red. Despite its appearance it had the same MA12 engine as the standard K10 Micra, although catalytic converters were a non-deletable feature on the car making them slightly less powerful than the non-cat cars.

=== Super Turbo ===
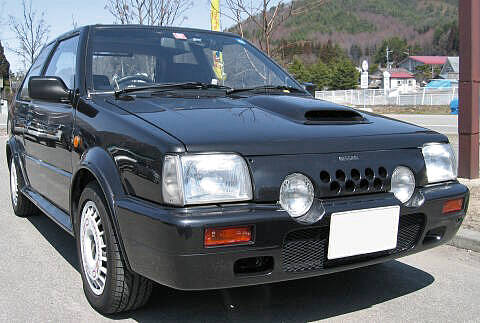
Nissan March Super Turbo (Japan)

In 1988, Nissan launched a limited 10,000-unit run of its homologated (certified) Nissan 1989 Micra Super Turbo (EK10GFR/GAR). Both this and the 1988 Micra R (EK10FR) featured the same highly advanced sequential compound charged (supercharger plus turbocharger) engine in an all-aluminium straight-four 930 cc eight-valve MA09ERT unit that produced 110 PS (81 kW; 108 hp) at 6400 rpm. This car came with either a 3-speed automatic or 5-speed manual gearbox with viscous limited slip differential, as well as options such as air conditioning and electric mirrors. The Micra Super Turbo still holds the crown for the fastest production Micra in Nissan's history, with factory performance figures of 7.7 seconds to go from 0 to 100 km/h (62 mph) and 15.5 seconds to run a quarter-mile. It has a top speed of 180 km/h (112 mph) (the maximum allowed to Japanese production cars at the time) and continued to be built until December 1991.

== Second generation (K11; 1992) ==
Second generation
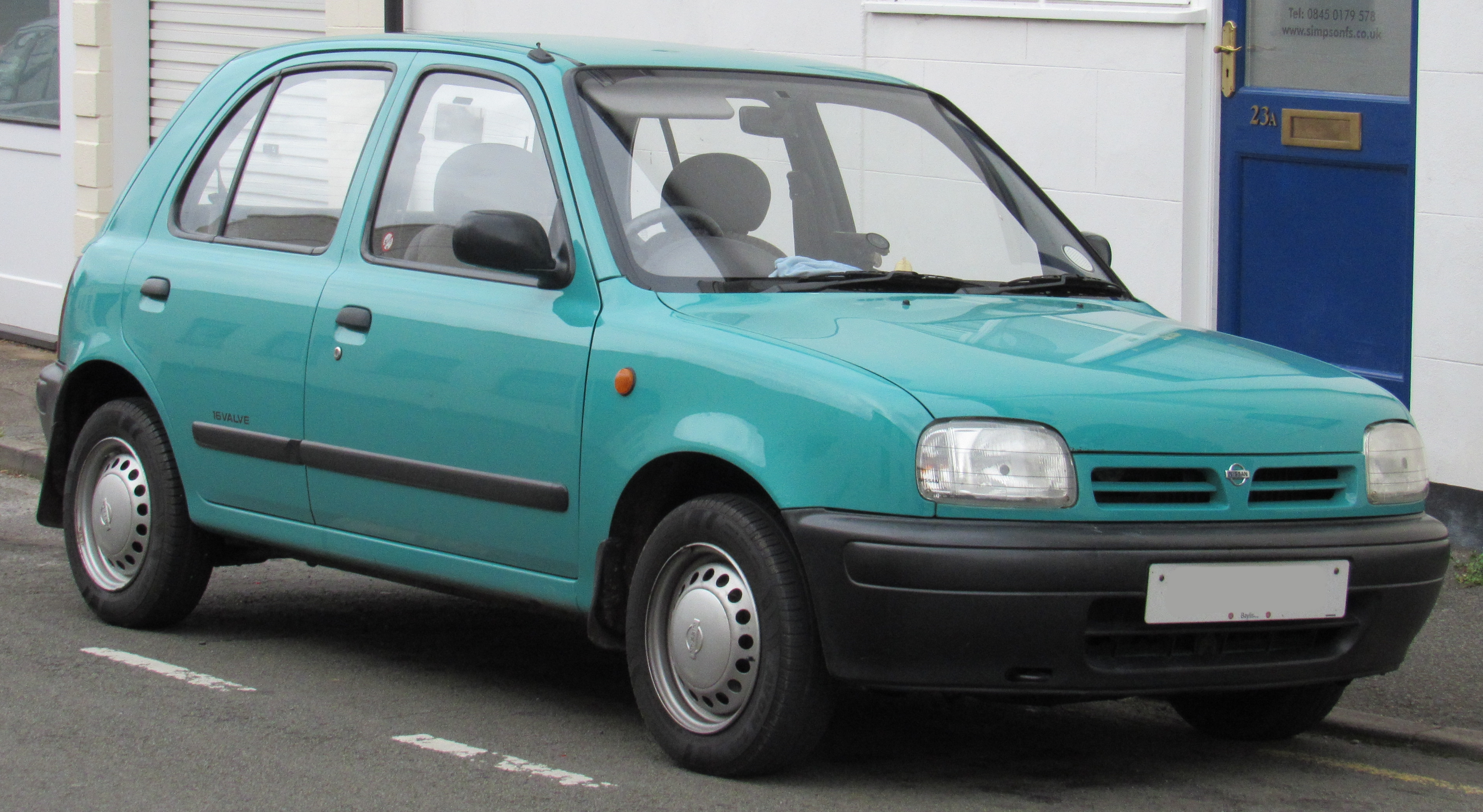
- Pre-facelift Nissan Micra

Overview
- Model code: K11
- Also called: Nissan March; Nissan Verita (Taiwan/Philippines); Mitsuoka Viewt; Muji Car 1000
- Production: 1992–2003; 1993–2007 (Taiwan); 2000–2007 (Philippines)
- Assembly: Japan: Oppama Plant, Yokosuka, Kanagawa; United Kingdom: Sunderland (NMUK); Taiwan: Miaoli (Yulon)

Body and chassis
- Body style: 3-door hatchback 5-door hatchback 2-door cabriolet 4-door sedan (March Cubic); 5-door station wagon (March Box)
- Layout: Front-engine, front-wheel-drive
- Related: Nissan Cube (Z10)

Powertrain
- Engine: 1.0 L CG10DE I4 (K11); 1.3 L CG13DE I4 (HK11); 1.4 L CGA3DE I4 (AK11); 1.5 L TUD5 diesel I4
- Transmission: 5-speed manual 4-speed automatic CVT

Dimensions
- Wheelbase: 2,360 mm (92.9 in)
- Length: 3,695–3,746 mm (145.5–147.5 in); 3,980 mm (156.7 in) (March Box)
- Width: 1,585–1,595 mm (62.4–62.8 in)
- Height: 1,430–1,440 mm (56.3–56.7 in)

=== Micra K11 (1992) ===
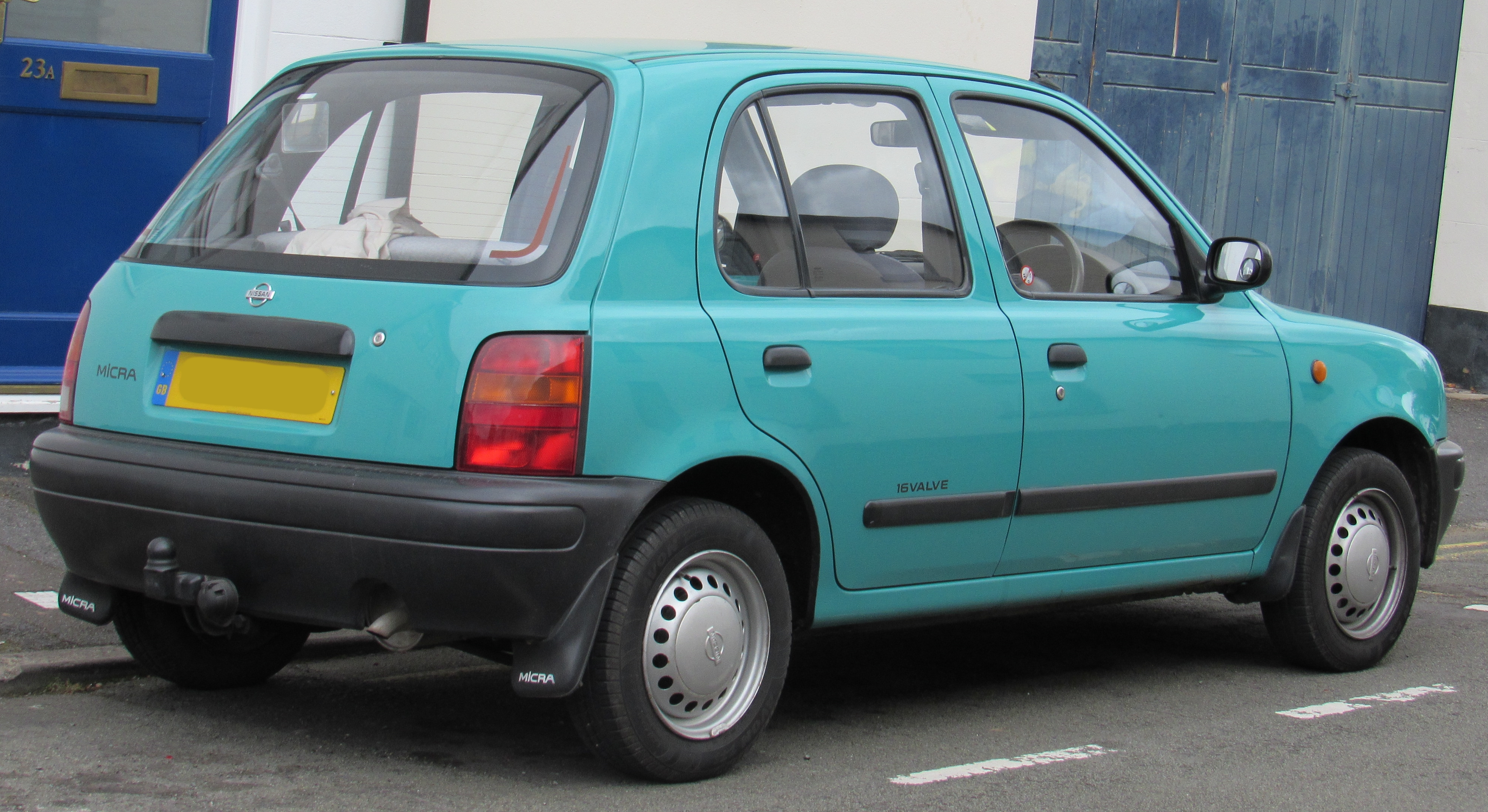
Pre-facelift Nissan Micra

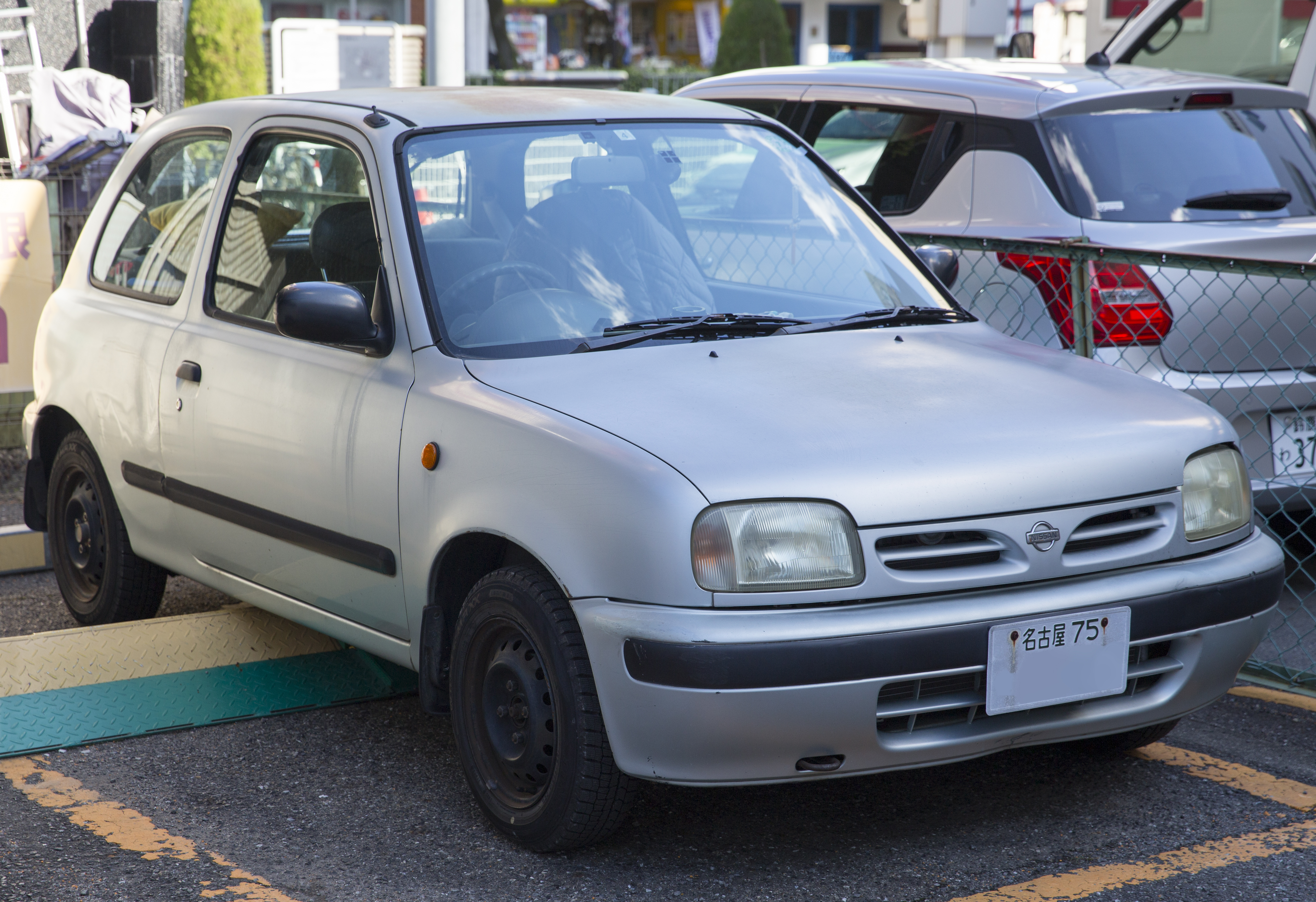
First revision of the pre-facelift design (March; Japan)

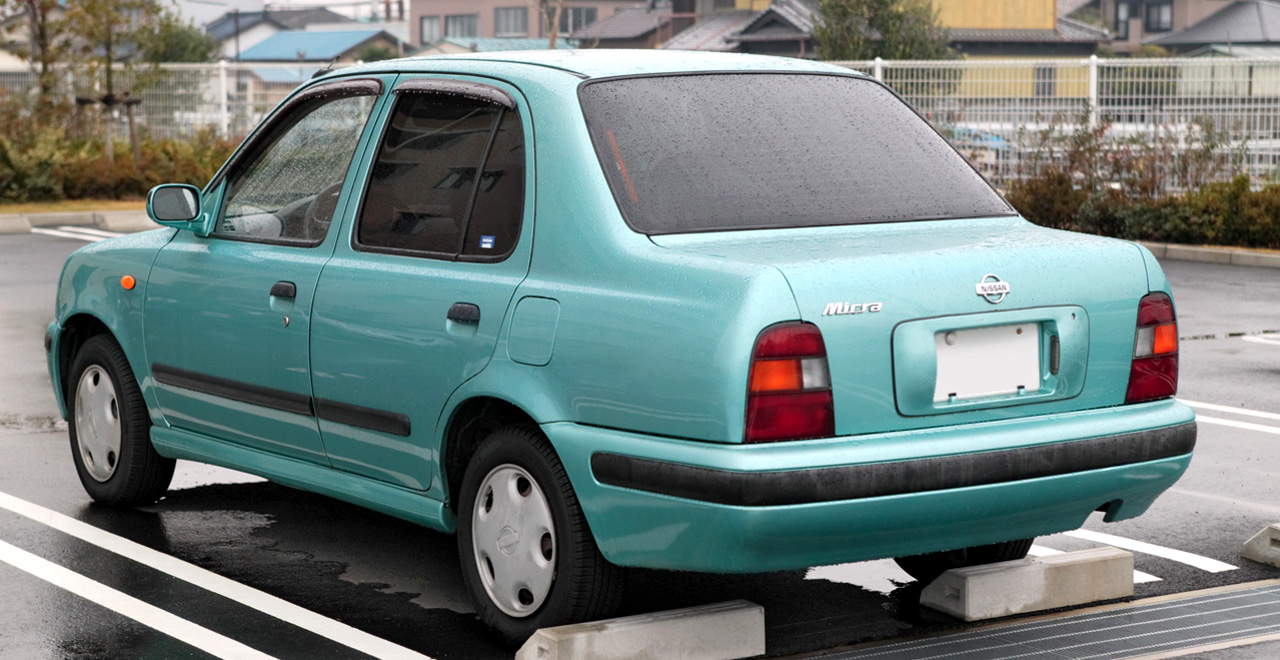
Taiwan designed pre-facelift Nissan March sedan

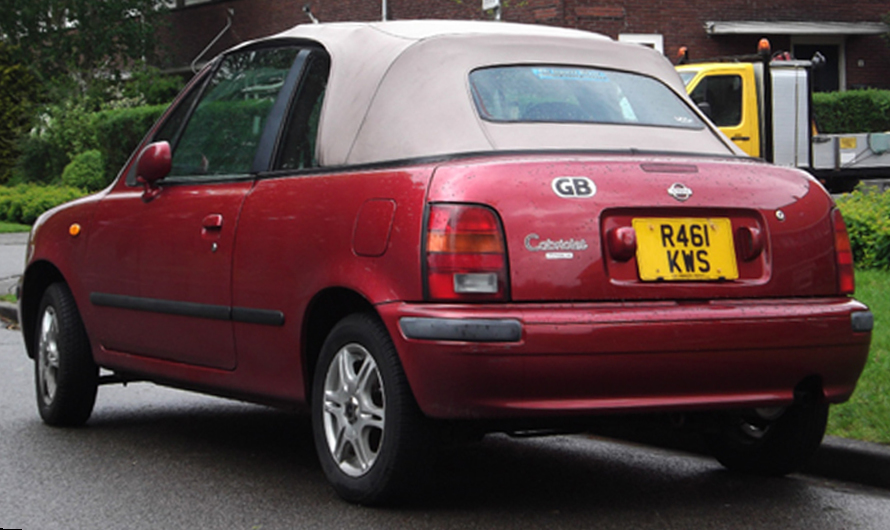
Nissan March Cabriolet

The second-generation K11 was built in the UK, Japan and Taiwan. It was launched in Japan in January 1992, and released in Europe in the fourth quarter of the year. It was powered by brand new all-aluminium 1.0 L (CG10DE) and 1.3 L (CG13DE) DOHC 16-valve engines, with 55 PS (40 kW; 54 hp) and 75 PS (55 kW; 74 hp) respectively (higher outputs were claimed in Japan, according to the JIS rather than DIN/ECE rating), both with ECCS (Electronic Concentrated Control System) fuel injection. It was the second Nissan model line to be produced in the UK at the Nissan Motor Manufacturing UK (NMUK) plant, Washington Tyne and Wear. A diesel version was offered with the 1.5 L PSA TUD market in Europe as Micra 1.5 D. Continuously variable transmission and power steering was an option on some models The equipment list also included safety features not usually available in this market segment: a toughened safety-cage and side-impact door beams were standard and pre-tensioning seat-belts and a driver's air-bag were optional. However, the Mk2 Micra scored only a modest two stars in Euro NCAP testing in 1997. CVT was the only automatic option available in Europe; in Japan, the 1.0-litre models were also available with a traditional, four-speed automatic transmission.

Airbags, antilock brakes, electric windows, central locking and air conditioning were as either standard equipment or options on some models in the Micra range. The European model range consisted of 1.0L and LX, 1.3LX, SLX and Super S. The car soon won the European Car of the Year award for 1993, becoming the first Japanese car to do so. It also won the Good Design Award (a Trade and Industry Design award in Japan) along with the Car of the Year Japan award in 1992. At its introduction in 1993, it won the Automotive Researchers' and Journalists' Conference Car of the Year award in Japan. To celebrate these three major awards, Nissan manufactured 2,000 examples of the limited V3 Award edition.

After receiving minor changes in December 1995 (a revised grille foreshadowing the later facelift design), the Micra received a facelift in 1998, six years after its launch.

There was a Cabriolet (FHK11) unveiled at the Tokyo Motor Show in 1995, but it was not sold until August 1997, with an electric top. These were produced in limited numbers for the Japanese Domestic Market (JDM) only. However, much like the Nissan Figaro, some have been imported into the UK unofficially. There was also an estate version called the March Box (WK11), which was unveiled in November 1999, with a split folding rear seat and either the 1.0- or 1.3-litre engines. Both engine options could be ordered either with a traditional, four-speed automatic transmission or with the revised Hyper-CVT transmission.

=== K11C (facelift; 1997) ===
In May 1997, a facelift version was introduced in Japan. The UK-built Micra, meanwhile, was only updated in March 1998 and was built until early 2003. The cumulative visual changes from the first models included redesigned headlights and front grille – the grille was now incorporated into the bonnet and featured Nissan's then-corporate "face". Both front and rear bumpers were also redesigned, oval instead of round side repeater indicators, major changes to the interior and dashboard, redesigned rear light lenses, and the radio aerial was repositioned from the top of the right-hand A-pillar to the middle of the roof, towards the rear. In Japan, the four-speed automatic became an option on the 1.3 as well, meaning that both engines could be ordered with three different types of transmission (5-speed manual, 4-speed automatic, or the CVT).

In November 1999, the original facelift was replaced by a second version known as the K11C. For UK-built Micras, this took place in late 2000. While it still looked quite similar from the outside, the engines had been updated to run on the newer individual coilpack system (whereas the earlier models had been fitted with a distributor). As well as this, the secondary catalytic converter was removed and the primary catalytic converter (on the manifold) was enlarged. Other exterior changes included new lights on the bumper, an altered lower body, orange turn signals and minor changes to the interior. Further changes included a redesigned rear wiper which rested horizontally instead of vertically, and the centre high level brake lamp being reduced in size and mounted at the top of the rear window, instead of on the parcel shelf.

The 1.3 L (1275 cc) CG13DE engine offered in previous K11s were removed in the second facelift, and replaced by a 1,348 cc "1.4" unit (CGA3DE). This was still referred to as a 1.3 in Japan. The 1.0-litre CG10DE remained in the second facelift models but had a slightly higher power output; 60 hp (44 kW) compared to the earlier 54 hp (40 kW). Also new in November 1999 was a four-wheel drive version, only offered on the hatchback with the 1.35-litre engine and CVT transmission.

In 2001, Muji, the well-known Japanese "non-brand" issued a limited release of 1,000 badgeless and decontented Nissan Marches, only available online. It was intended as an exercise to test their online marketing systems and was sold as the "Muji Car 1000" (ムジ・カー 1000). The rear seat is upholstered in vinyl, the hubcaps are minimal, and the car was only offered in "marble white". The Muji Car 1000 has a four-speed automatic transmission and the 1-litre CG10DE engine.

By late 2002, the new K12 was introduced (although the S and SE models were still being built). They were fully replaced by K12 in early 2003.

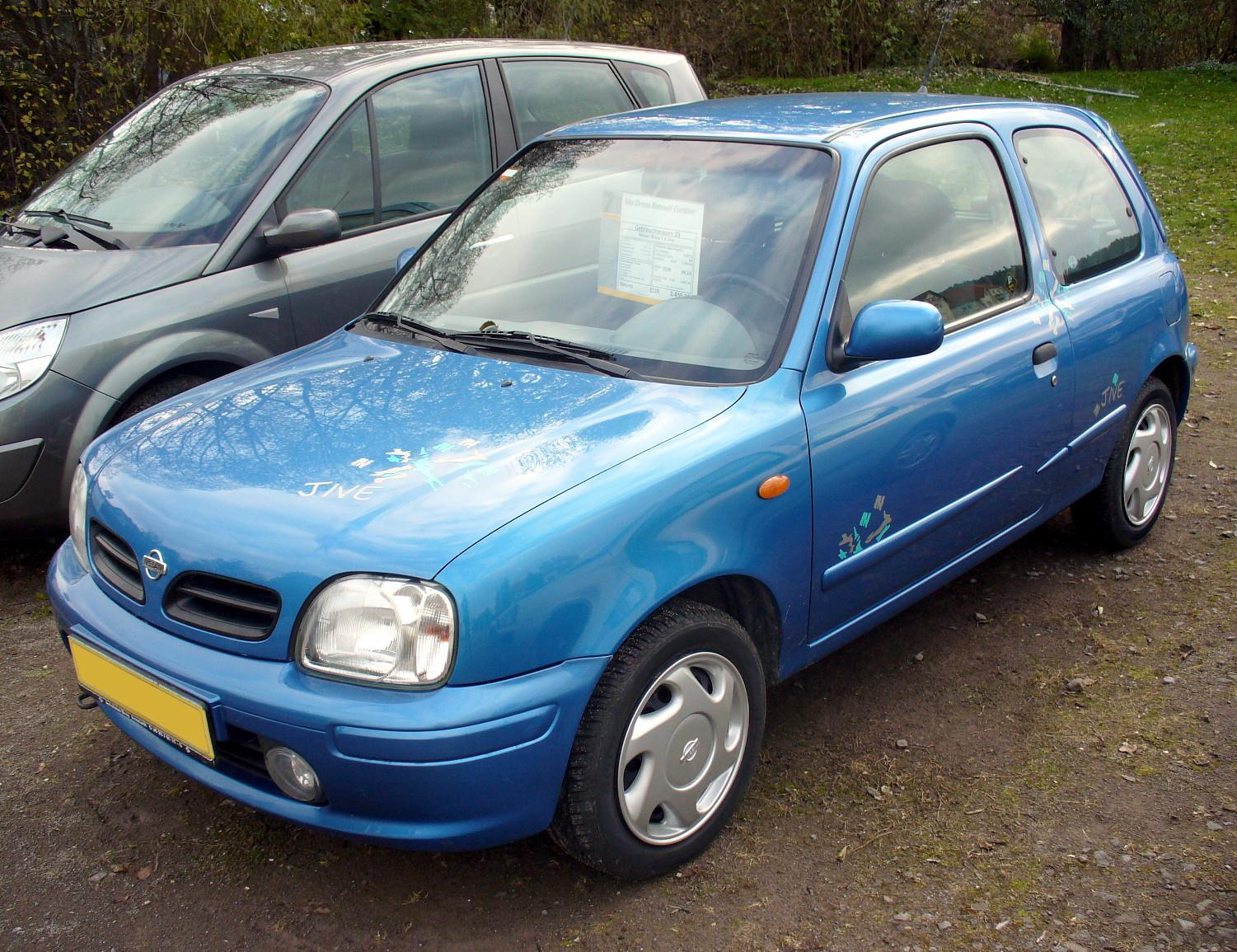
First facelift Nissan Micra (Europe)

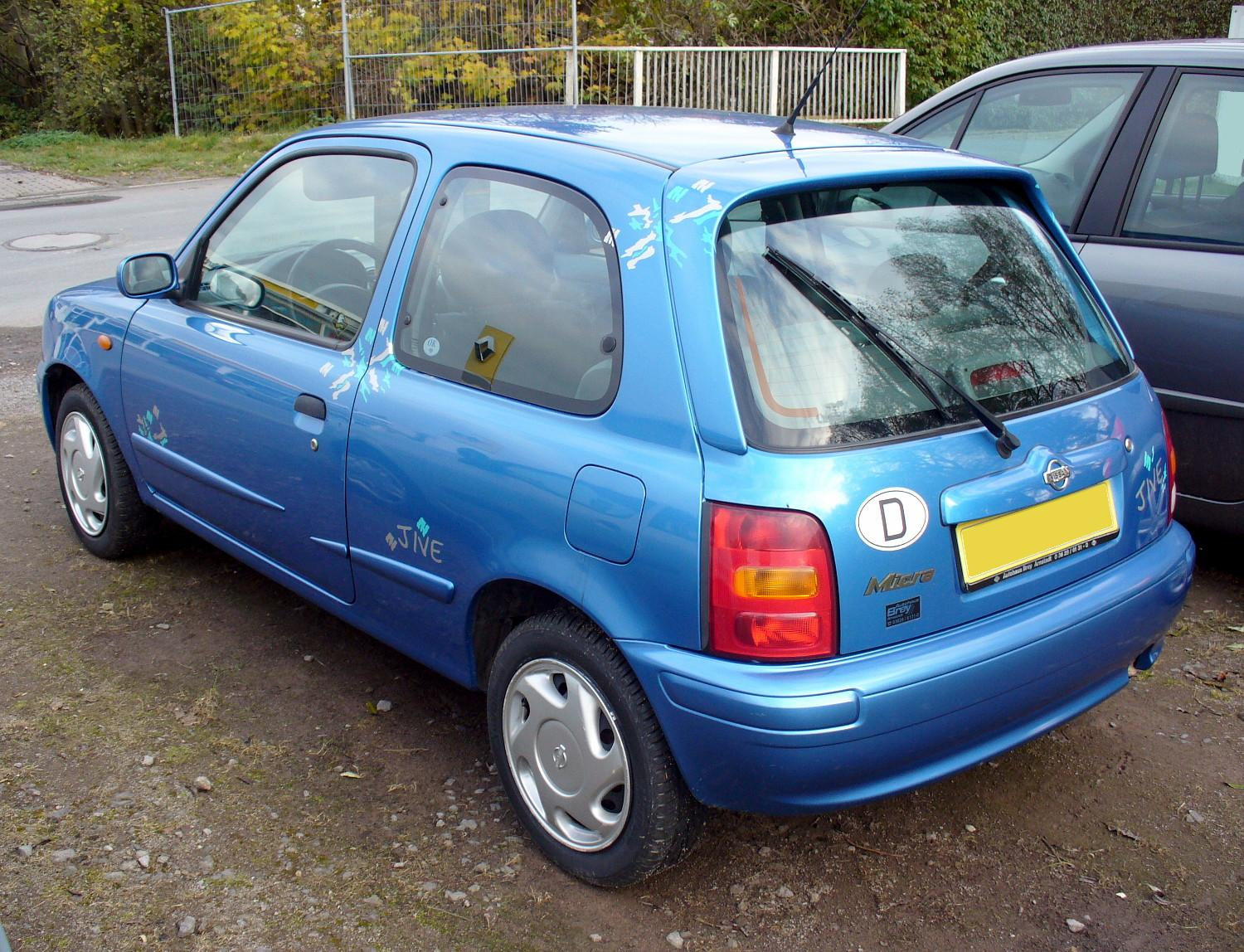
First facelift Nissan Micra (Europe)

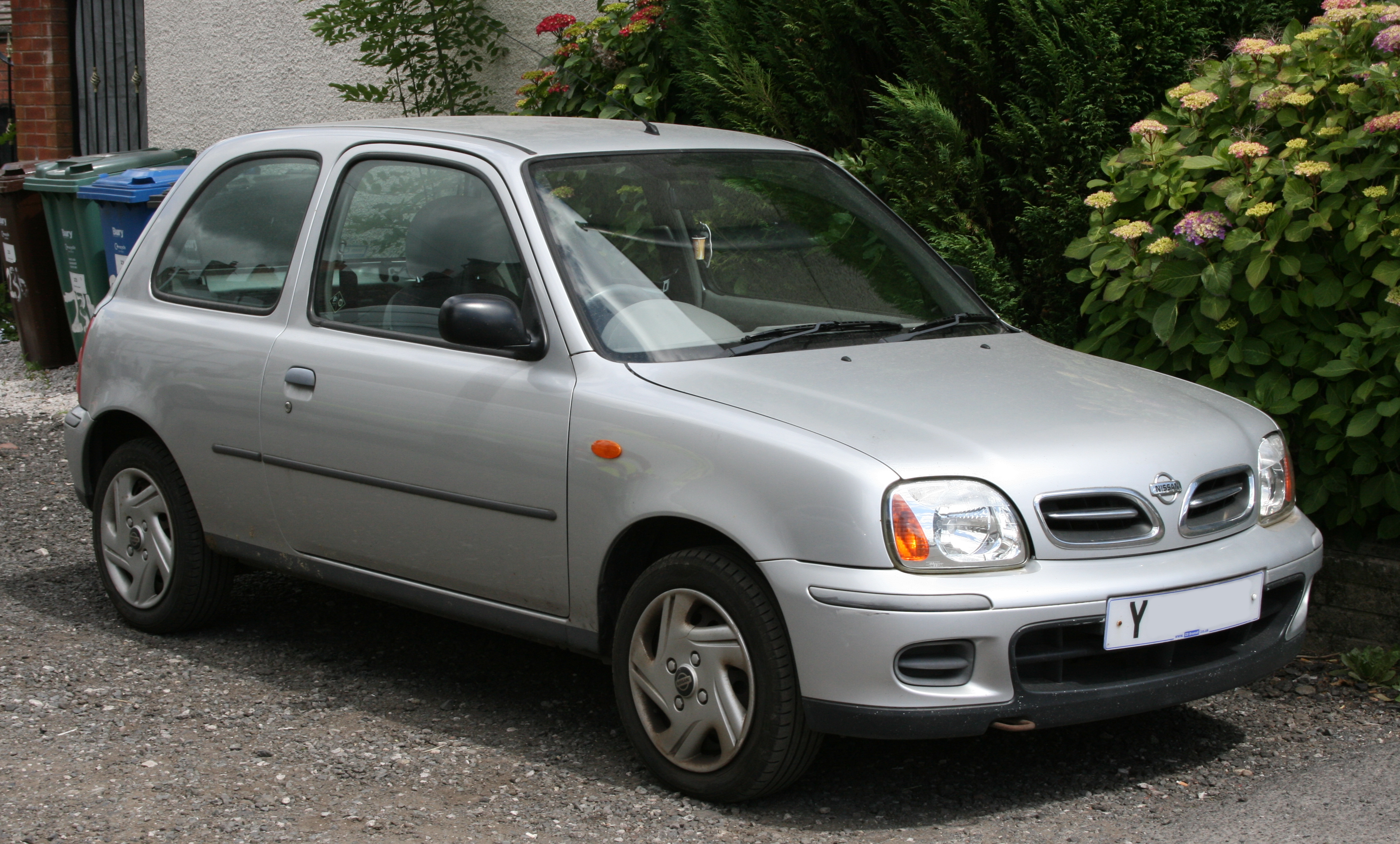
Second facelift Nissan Micra (Europe)

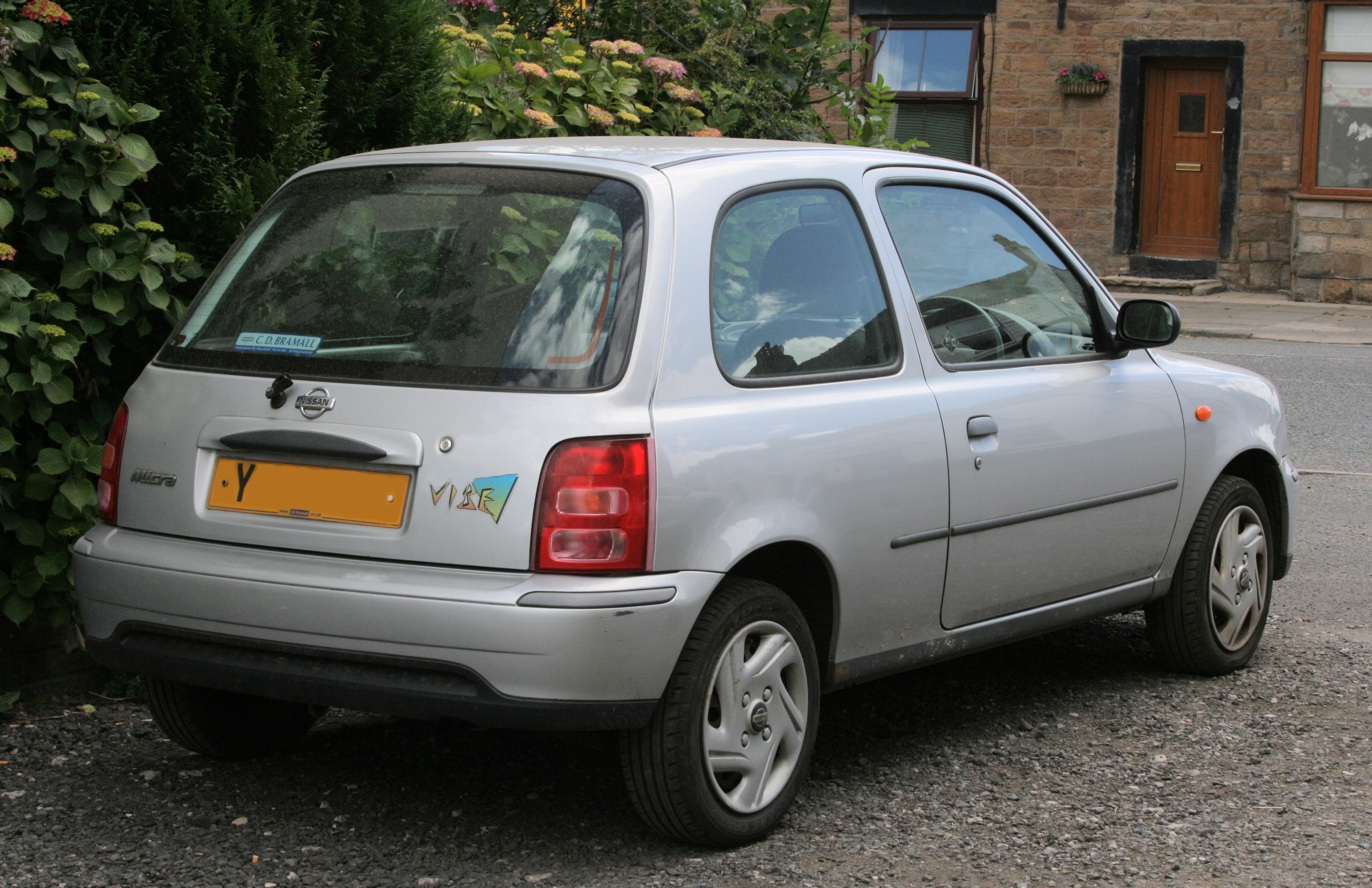
Second facelift Nissan Micra (Europe)

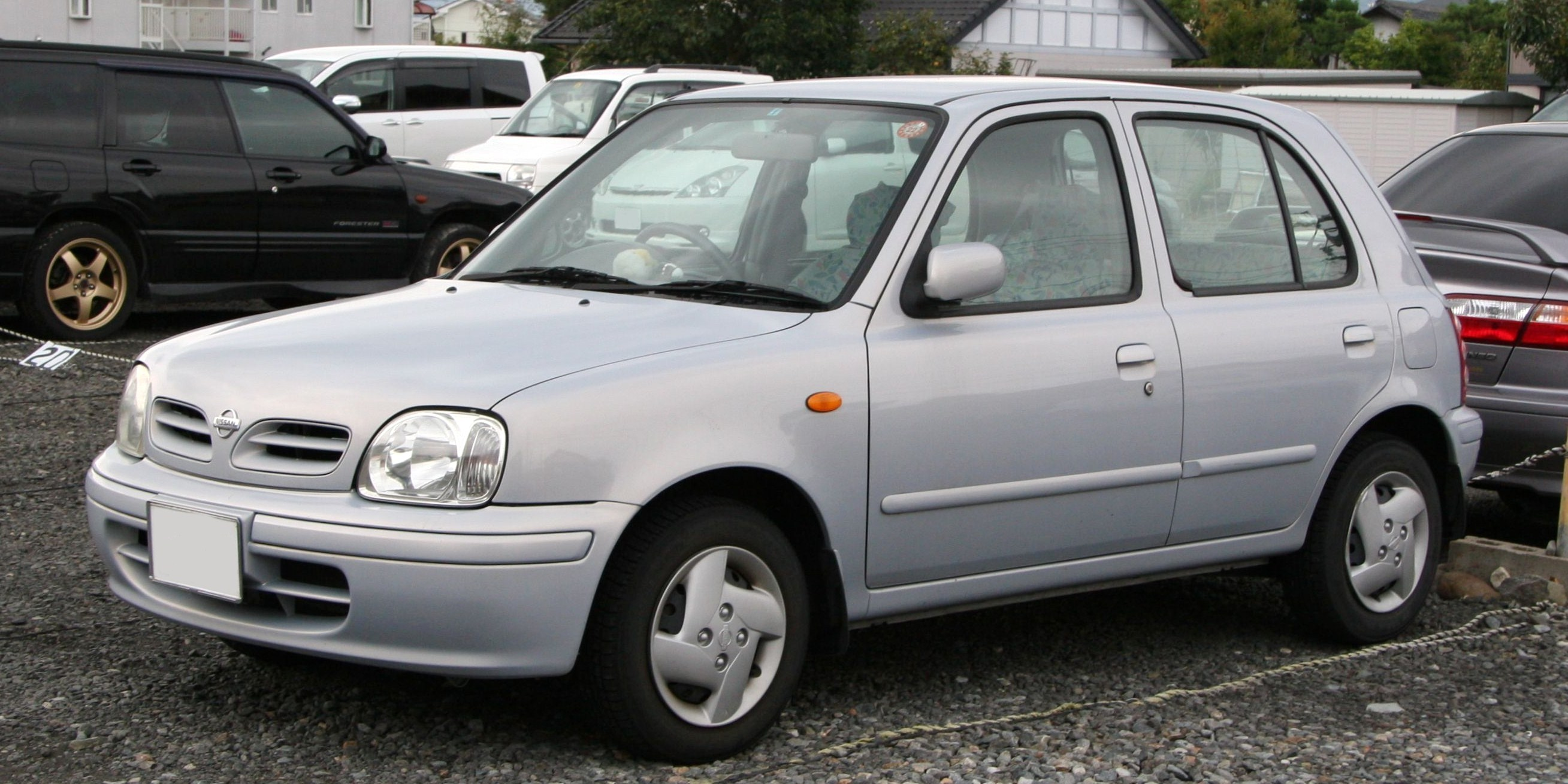
Second facelift Nissan March (Japan)

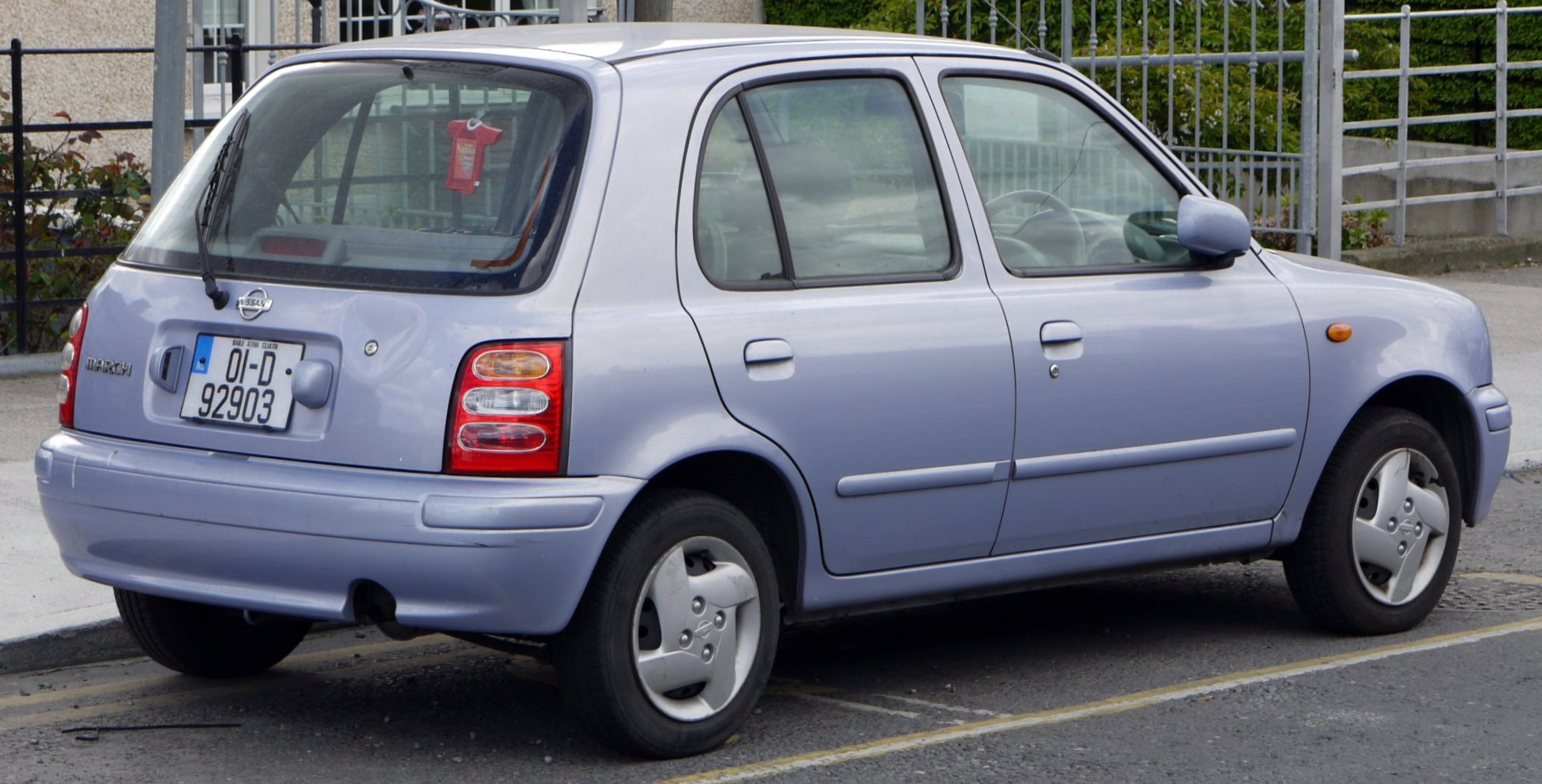
Second facelift Nissan March (Japan)

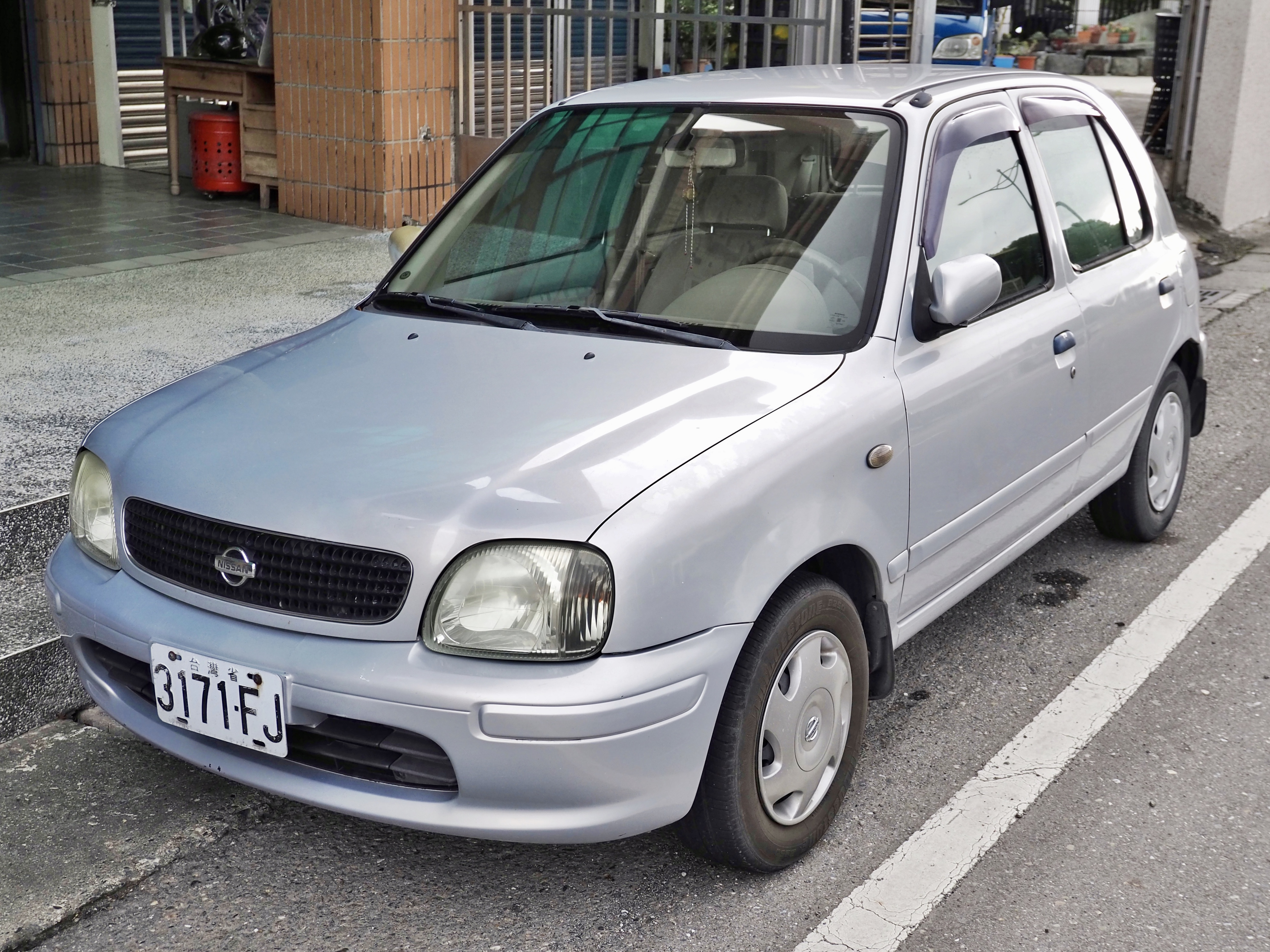
Second facelift Nissan March GX (Taiwan)

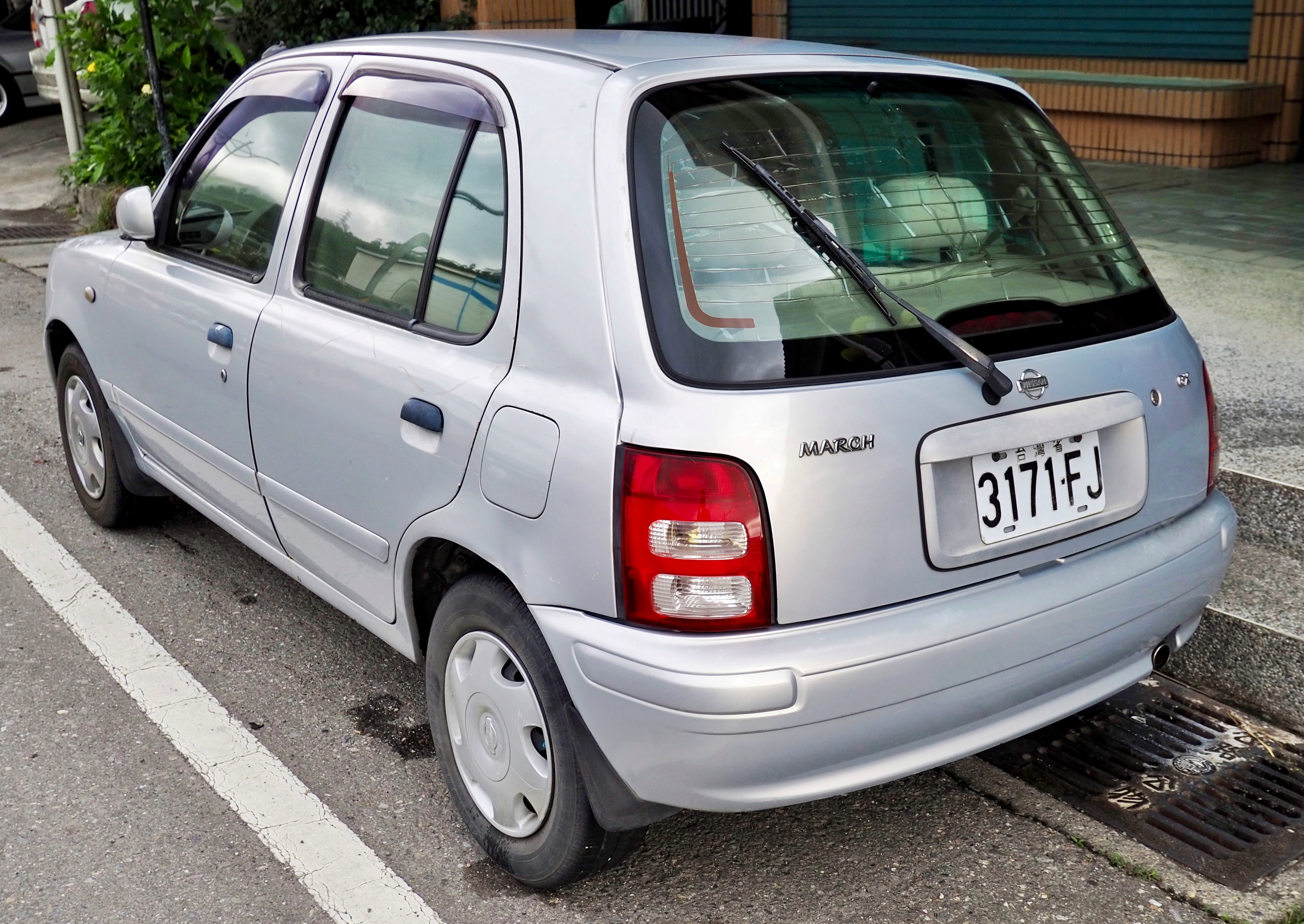
Second facelift Nissan March GX (Taiwan)

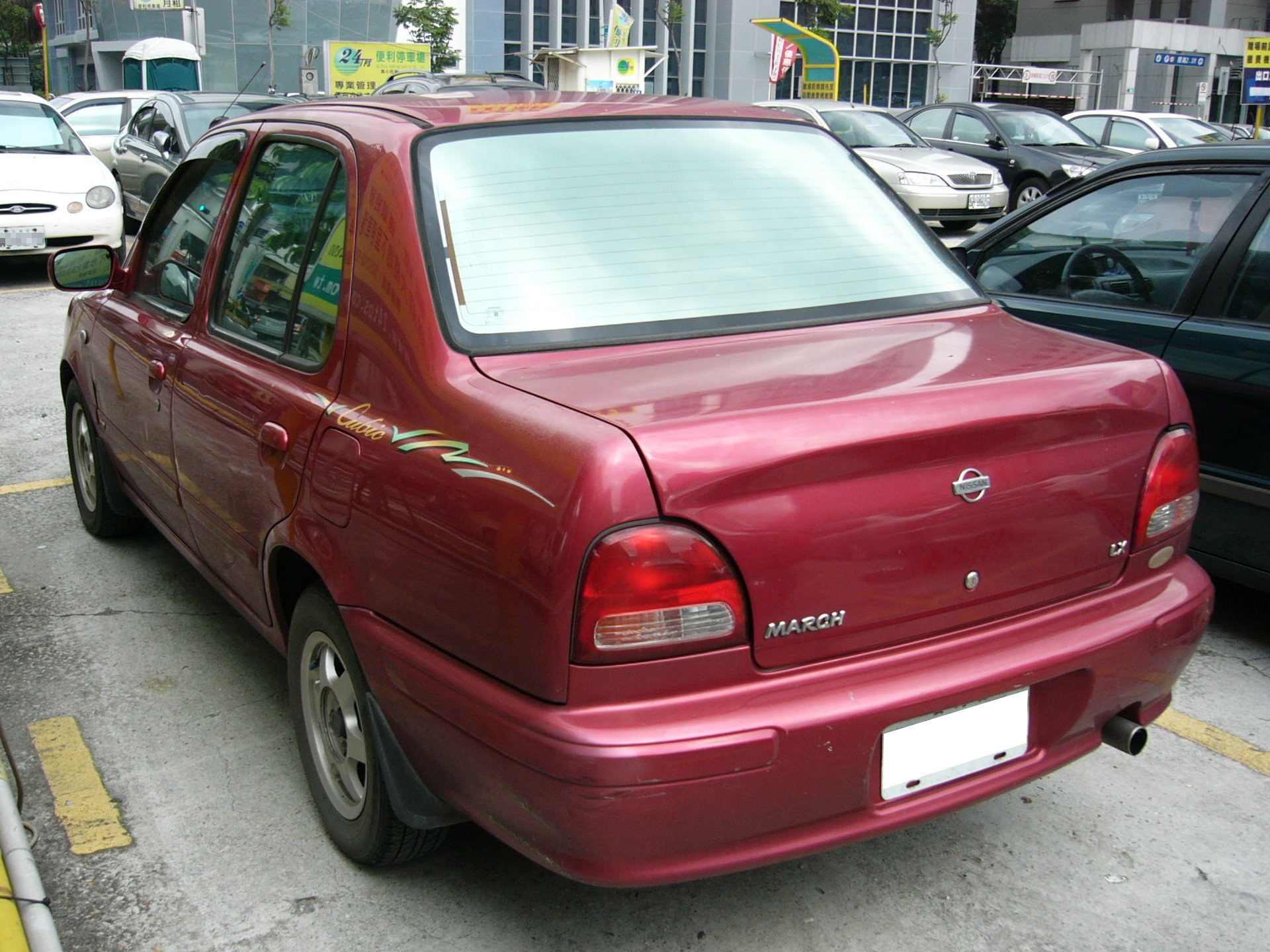
Second facelift Nissan March LX Cubic (Taiwan)

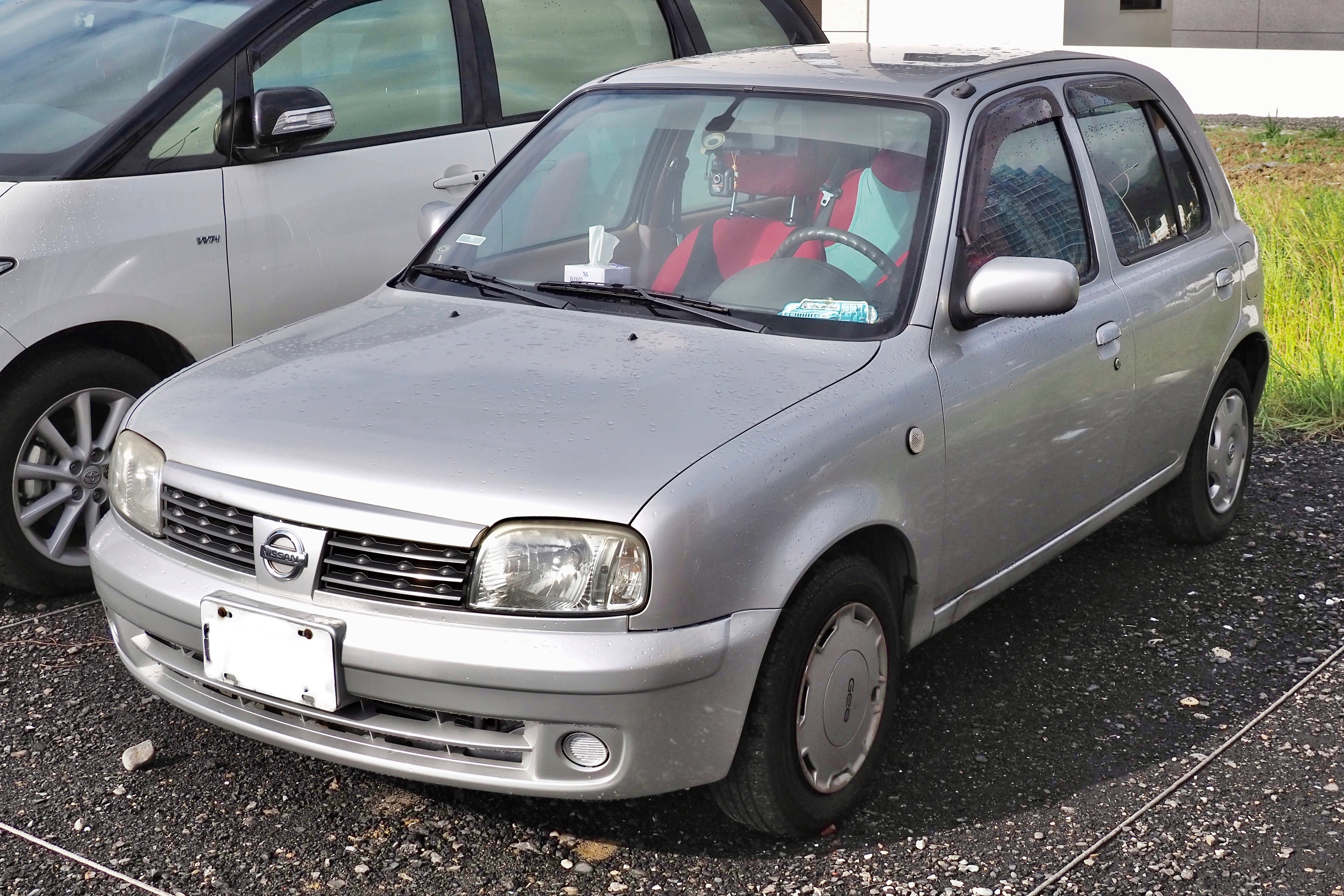
Third facelift Nissan March (Taiwan)

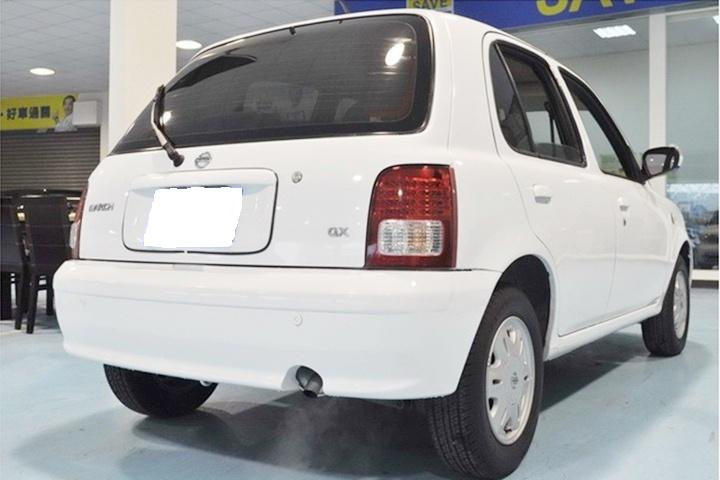
Third facelift Nissan March GX (Taiwan)

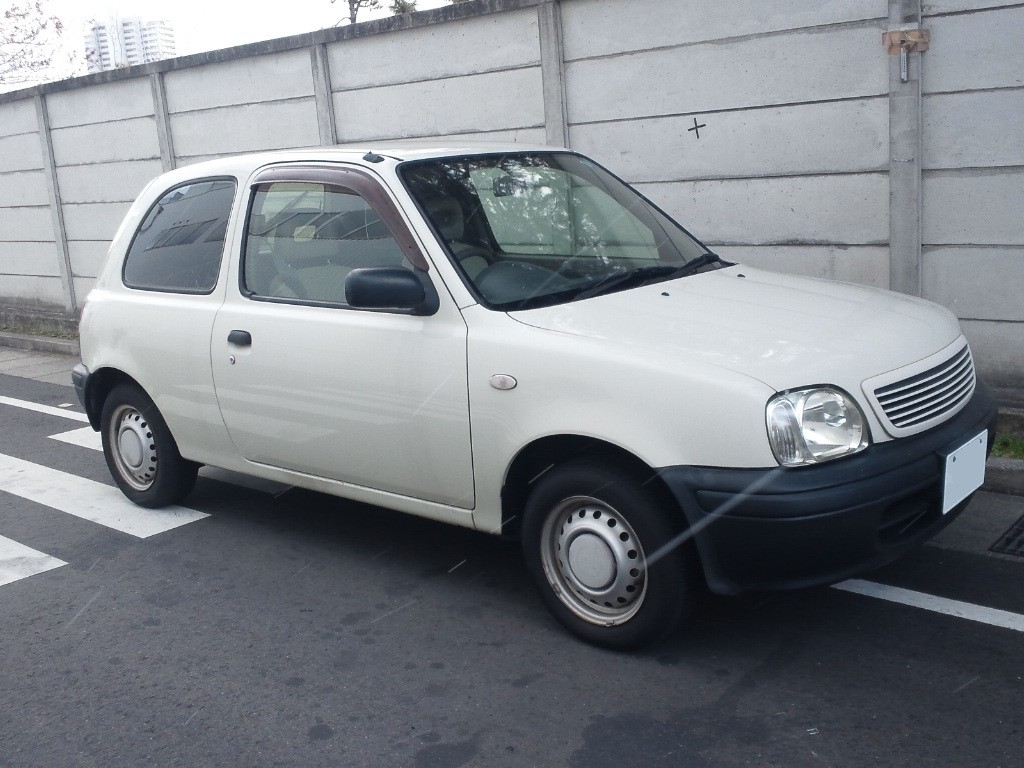
Muji Car 1000 (Japan)

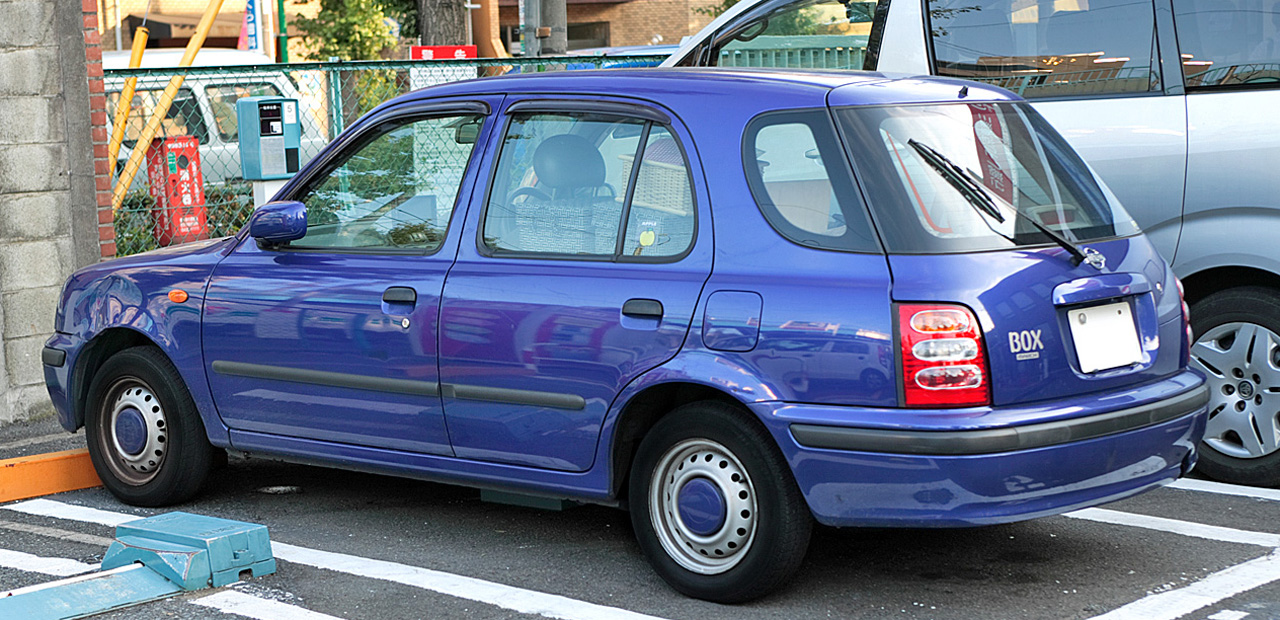
Nissan March Box (Japan)

=== Bolero, Rumba ===
The March Bolero was a luxury model available in the Japanese markets from October 1997 to 2003. It featured a redesigned exterior with a traditionally designed chrome grille and round headlights, and an interior with special upholstery and unique fabric color. The taillights were replaced by protruding inserts holding twin round lamps. Developed and built by Autech, the Bolero was based on the Colette (1.0) and the A# (1.3) models and was available with three or five doors.

The Bolero sold well and in November 1998, Nissan added the March Rumba, a more "casual" variation of the theme. It also had a revised grille, but lower and wider and turned down at the corners. The taillights were the same as for the Bolero but the bumbers were smoother, without the Bolero's chrome overriders. The interior fabric was either Denim Blue or Warm Gray, with distinct piping, and the dashboard had a vaguely sporting air, with ivory meter faces and a sporty, three-spoke steering wheel. The Rumba was available in the same versions as the Bolero.

A similar model with a slightly different front, with a lower, wider grille, was available in Taiwan as the Nissan Verita. The Verita was also sold in the Philippines.

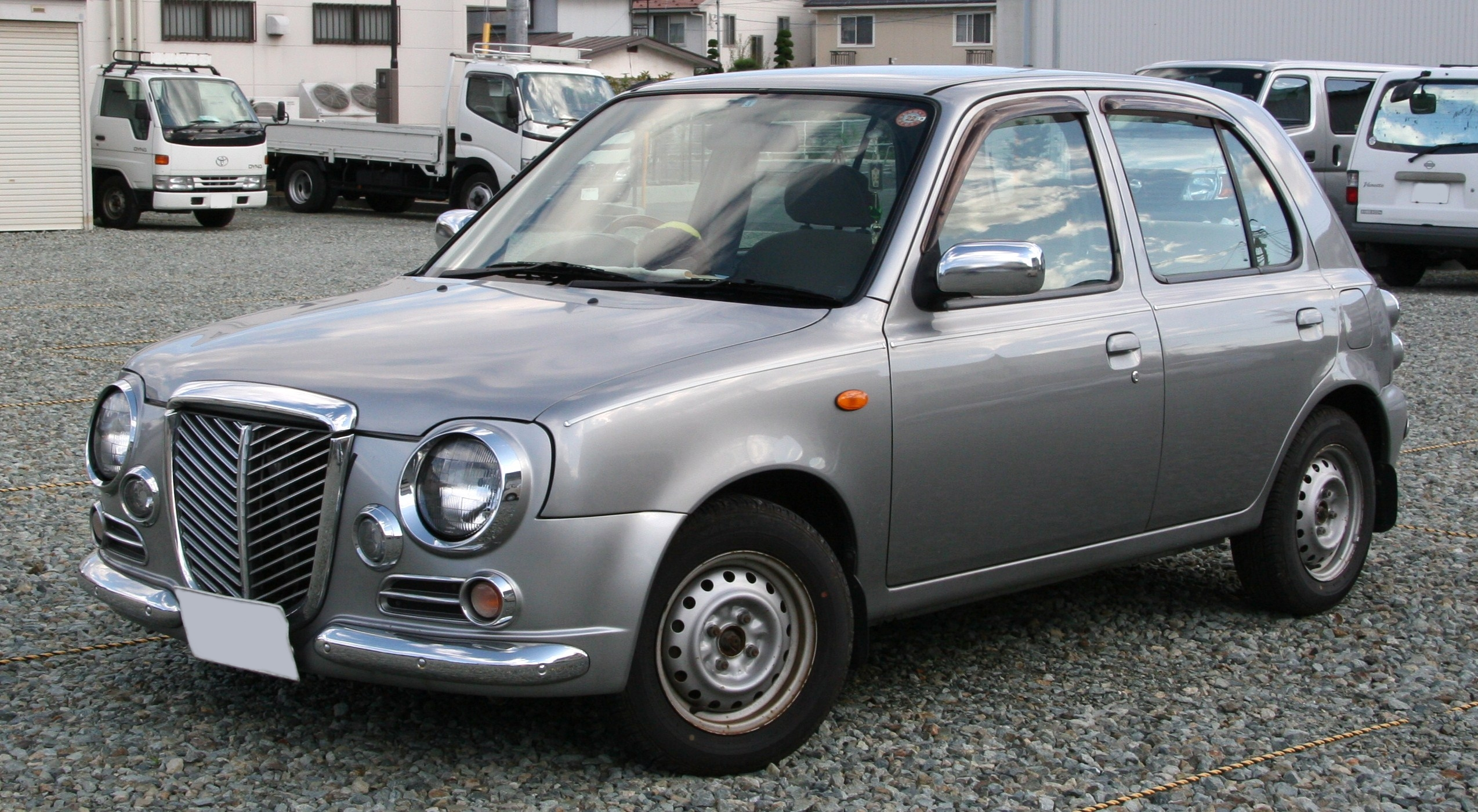
March Bolero (Japan)

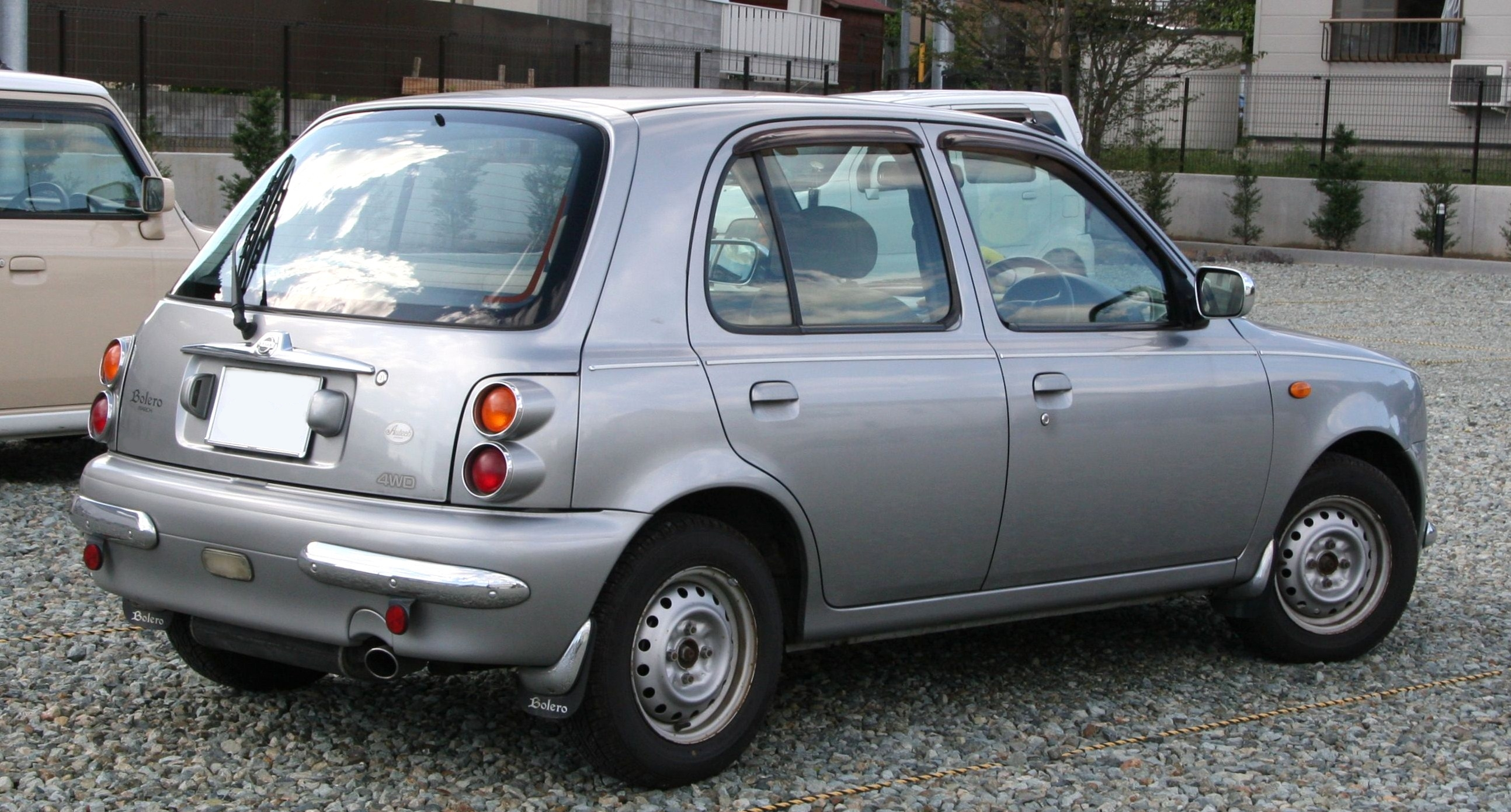
March Bolero (Japan)

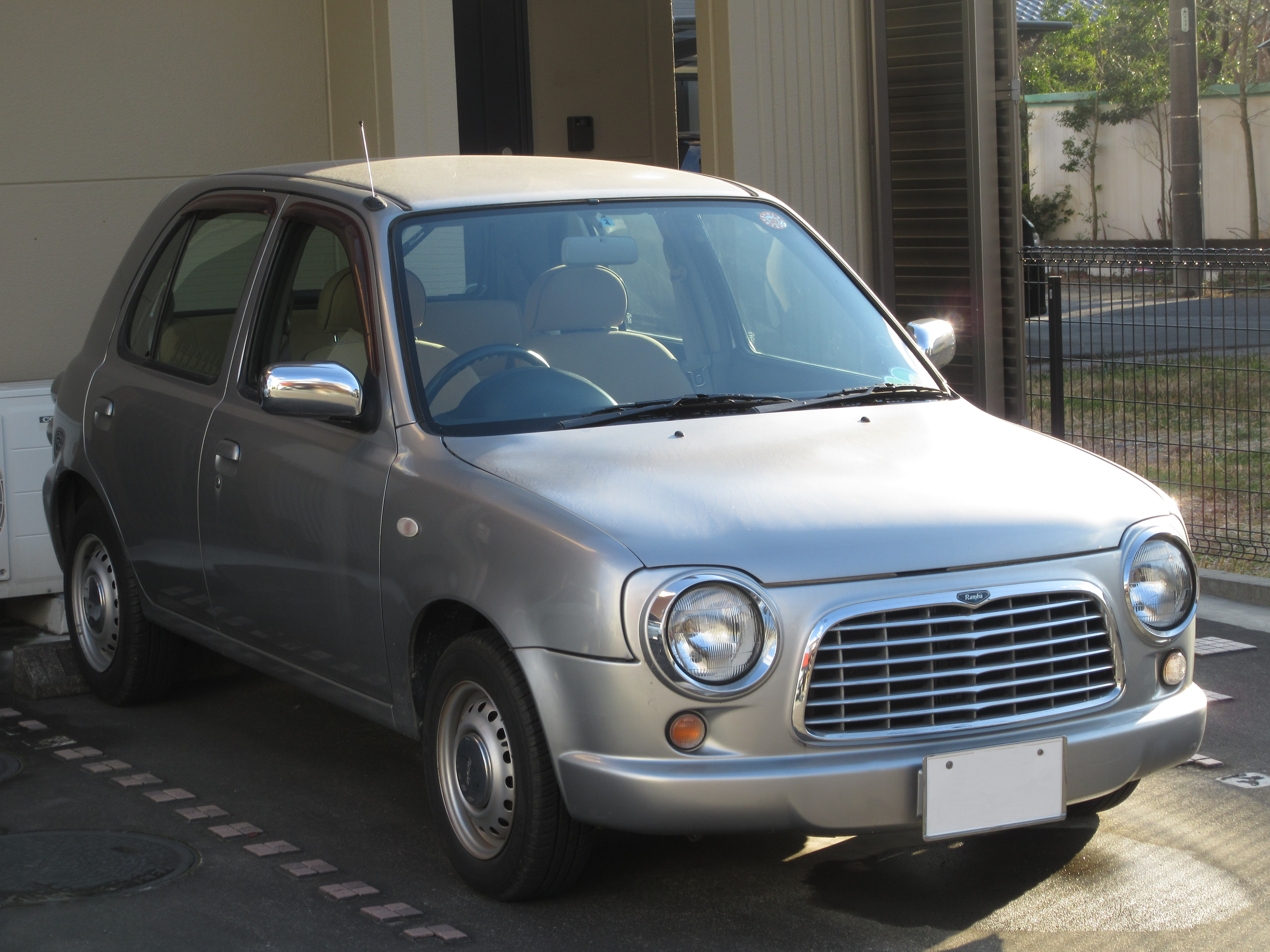
March Rumba (Japan)

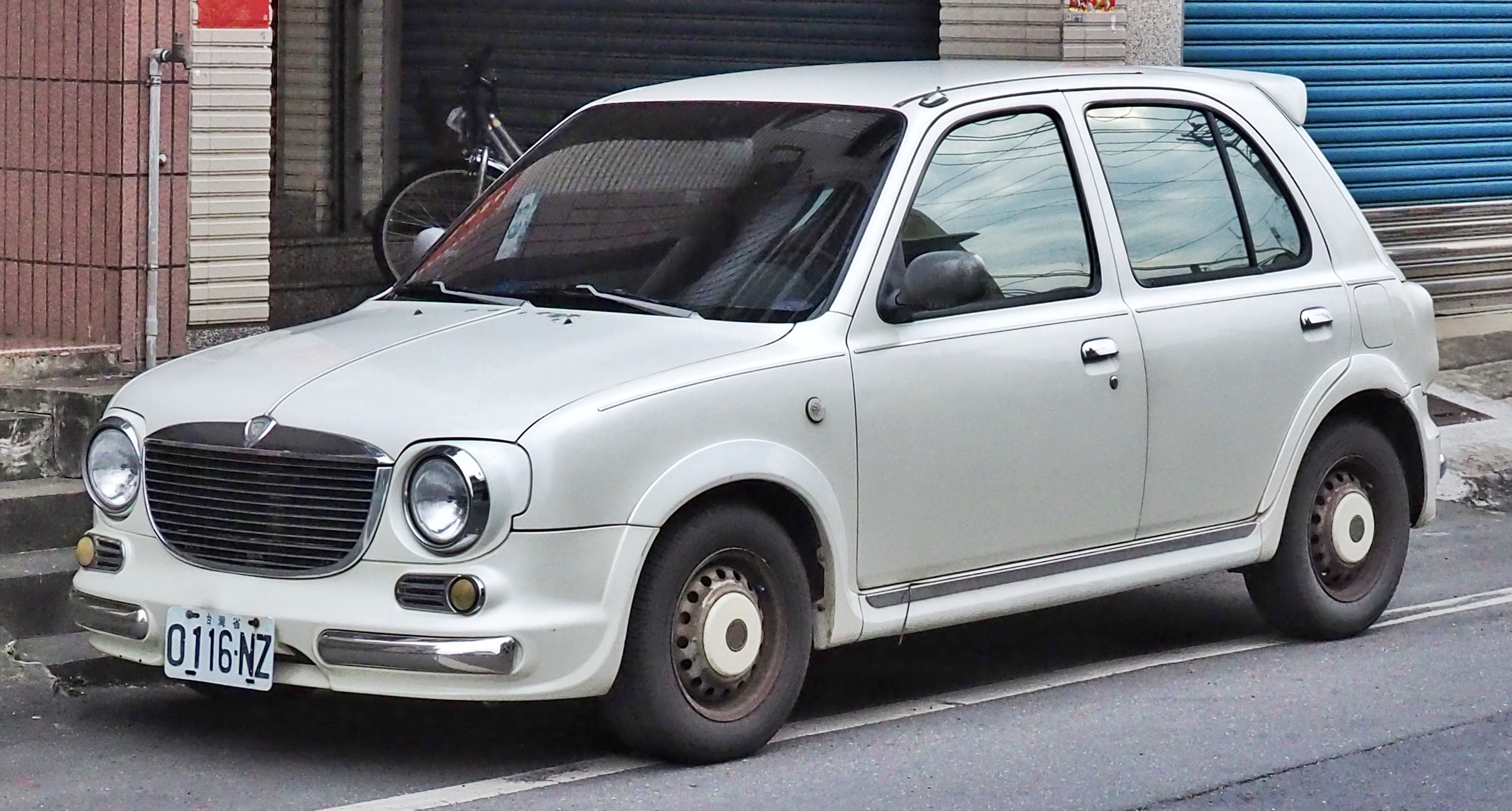
Verita (Taiwan)

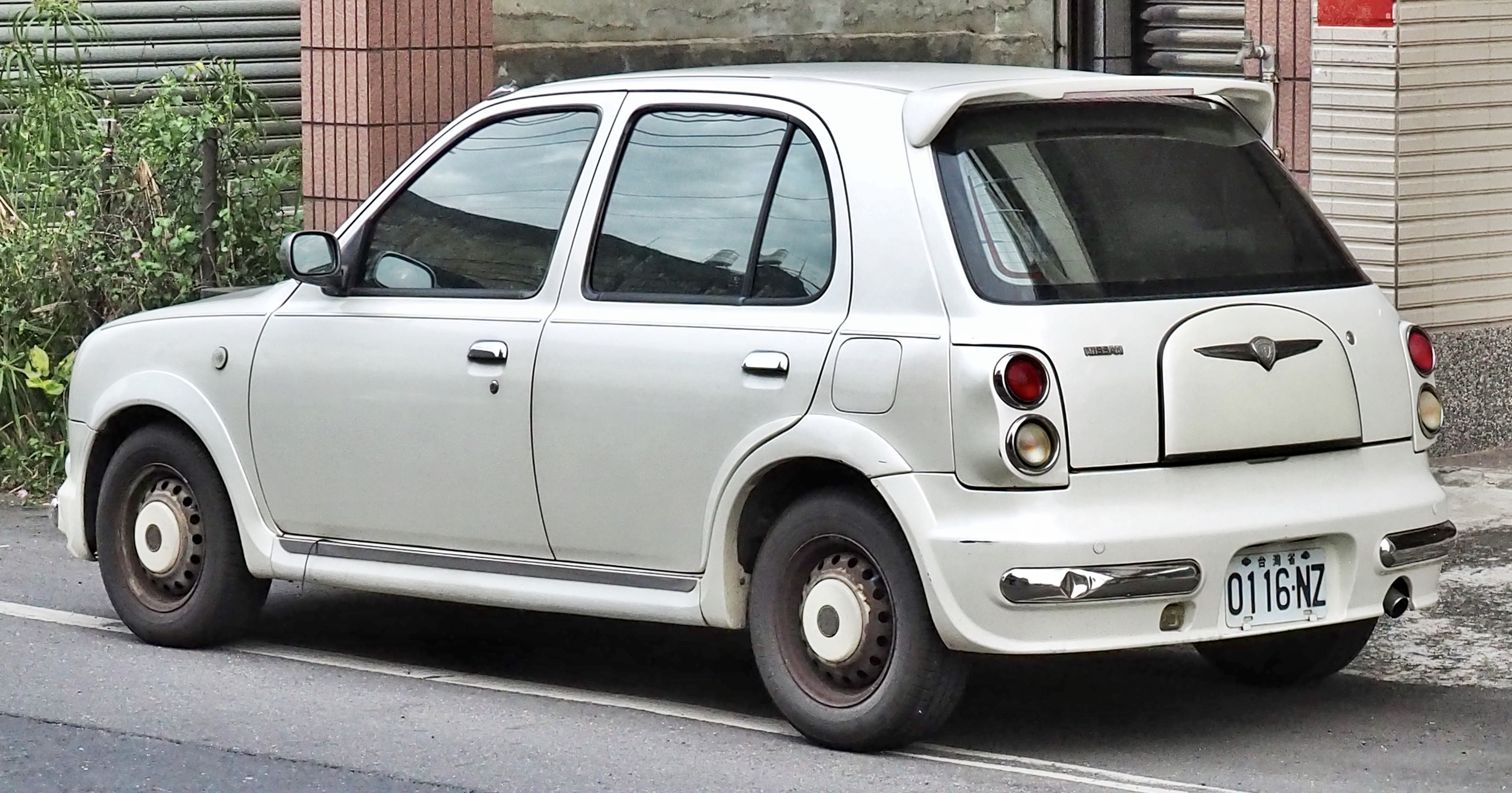
Verita (Taiwan)

=== Super S ===
The Super S trim was available in 1993–1997; the name was changed to SR when the Micra was facelifted. Differences include a slightly faster 3.6 turns lock-to-lock rack, over the standard 3.8 turns, different colour-coded front and rear bumpers, colour-coded wing mirrors and bump strips, rear wrap-around spoiler, front fog lights, remote fuel flap opening, wider 175/60/r13 tyres, rear ashtray, tachometer, more heavily bolstered seats, split folding rear seats and rear speaker shelf as standard. Features such as electric windows and power steering were still optional extras. The only engine available for the Super S was the 1.3-litre 75 hp (55 kW) CG13DE twin cam, 16-valve engine

== Third generation (K12; 2002) ==
Third generation
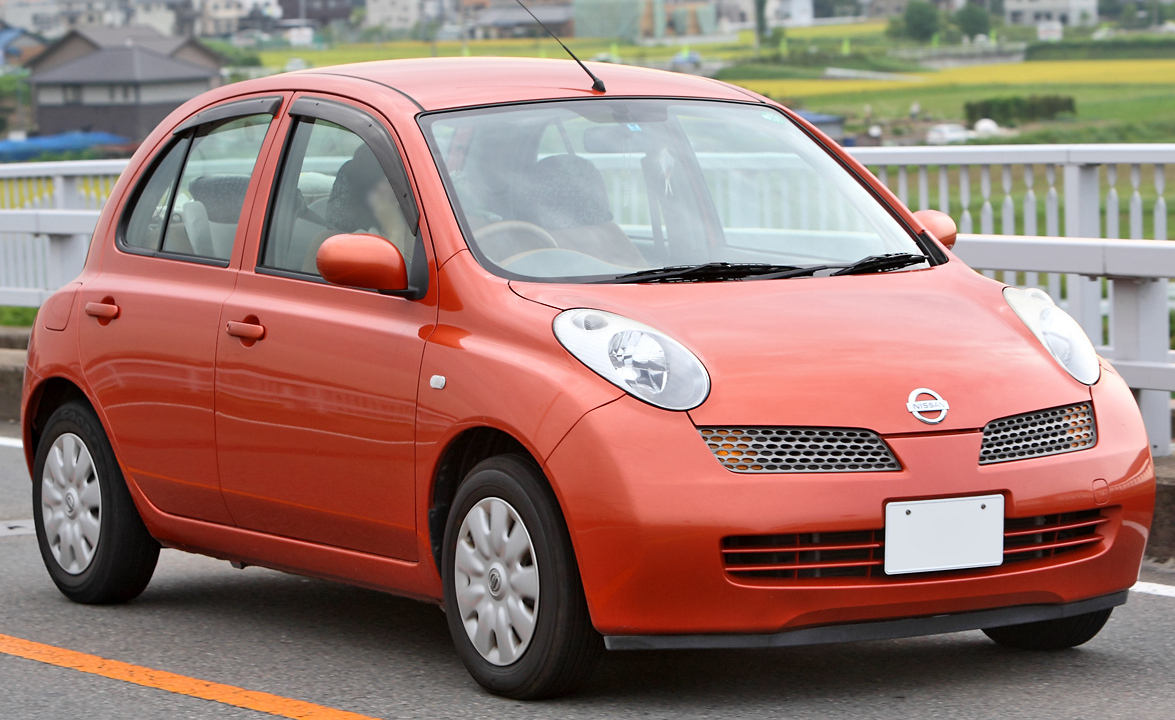
- Pre-facelift Nissan March (Japan)

Overview
- Model code: K12
- Also called: Nissan March; Mitsuoka Viewt; Duesen Bayern Ritz
- Production: February 2002 – June 2010
- Assembly: Japan: Yokosuka, Kanagawa (Oppama Plant); United Kingdom: Sunderland (NMUK); Germany: Osnabrück (Karmann, C+C)

Body and chassis
- Body style: 3/5-door hatchback 2-door coupé convertible
- Layout: Front-engine, front-wheel-drive or all-wheel-drive (Nissan E-4WD)
- Platform: Nissan B platform
- Related: Nissan Tiida/Versa; Nissan Note; Nissan Cube; Nissan Juke; Nissan NV200; Renault Clio III; Renault Modus; Duesen Bayern Ritz

Powertrain
- Engine: Petrol: 1.0 L CR10DE I4; 1.2 L CR12DE I4; 1.4 L CR14DE I4; 1.5 L HR15DE I4; 1.6 L HR16DE I4; Diesel: 1.5 L K9K I4
- Transmission: 5-speed manual 4-speed automatic

Dimensions
- Wheelbase: 2,430 mm (95.7 in) (hatchback); 2,432 mm (95.7 in) (coupé convertible)
- Length: 3,719 mm (146.4 in) (hatchback); 3,806 mm (149.8 in) (coupé convertible)
- Width: 1,680 mm (66.1 in) (hatchback); 1,668 mm (65.7 in) (coupé convertible)
- Height: 1,540 mm (60.6 in) (hatchback); 1,441 mm (56.7 in) (coupé convertible)

=== Micra K12 (2002) ===
The next version of the Micra, the K12, was unveiled in production form at the 2002 Paris Motor Show, following the lines of the Nissan mm.e concept car presented the year before at the Frankfurt Motor Show. It was introduced to the Japanese market in February 2002 and to the European market at the end of 2002., The car was restyled, featuring a new, 70 mm longer wheelbase (developed with Renault), increased height and width, and prominent headlamps extending into the wings/fenders. The redesign coincided with the Japanese Nissan dealership network Nissan Cherry Store being renamed Nissan Red Stage in 1999. Other features included a sliding rear seat and optional keyless ignition. The range of engines included improved 1.2 (CR12DE) and 1.4 (CR14DE) petrol models, and a Renault-sourced 1.5 diesel unit (K9K). The automatic CVT transmission of the previous model was replaced by a conventional automatic transmission.

Though its successor came out in 2010, the K12 was produced up through model year 2011.

Euro NCAP tested a Micra 1.2 S in 2003 achieving safety ratings of:

- Adult Occupant:
- Pedestrian:
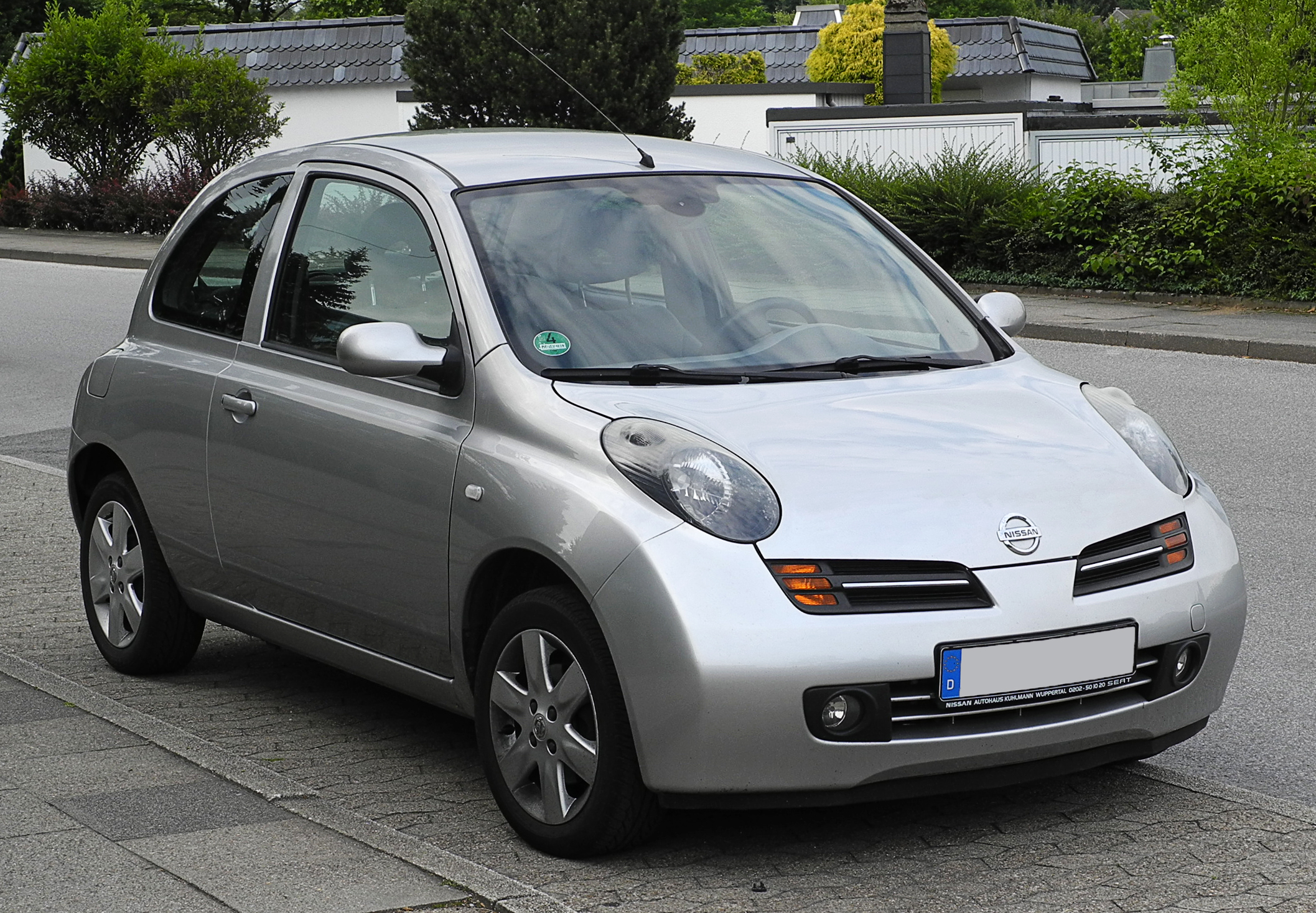
2002–2006 Nissan Micra 3-door (Europe)

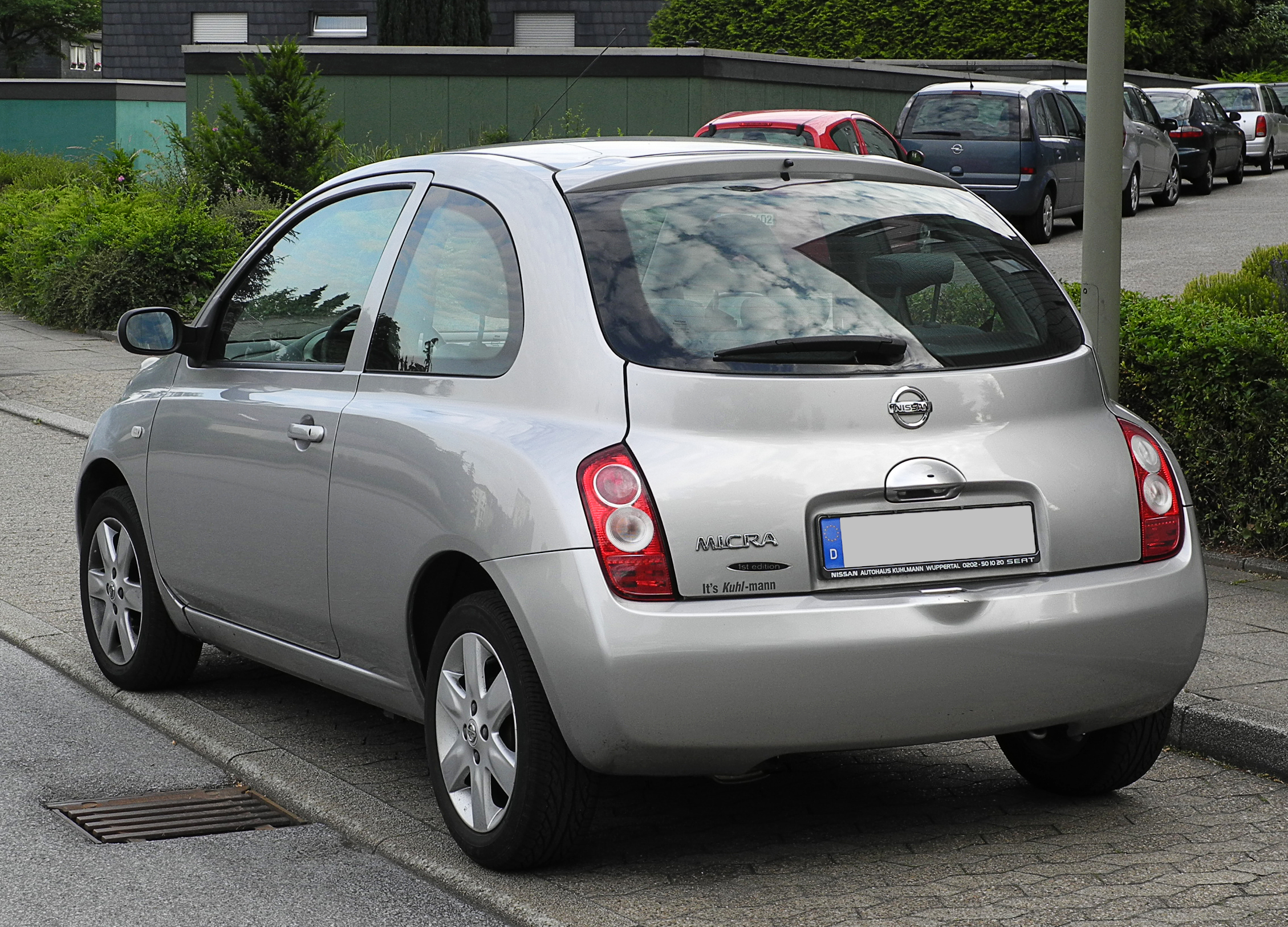
2002–2006 Nissan Micra 3-door (Europe)

==== Nissan March K12 (2002) ====
The vehicle was unveiled in Nissan Headquarters Gallery, and in Nissan's Ginza Gallery in a wide array of colour variations.

March Enchante includes a swivel front passenger's seat that turns 90° to facilitate easy ingress and egress. The March Driving Helper is fitted with hand-operated driving controls to enable persons with leg disabilities to drive and a control lever for operating the accelerator and the brakes with the left hand. These hand-operated controls are incorporated in the Autech Driving Control package, developed originally by Autech Japan for Nissan vehicles.

The March Enchante was unveiled at the 2004 Tokyo Motor Show.

The vehicles went on sale on 5 March 2002. Early models include 14e (5-door), 12c (3/5-door), 10b (3/5-door). Early March Enchante models include 12c (3/5-door). Early March Driving Helper models include 12c (3/5-door).

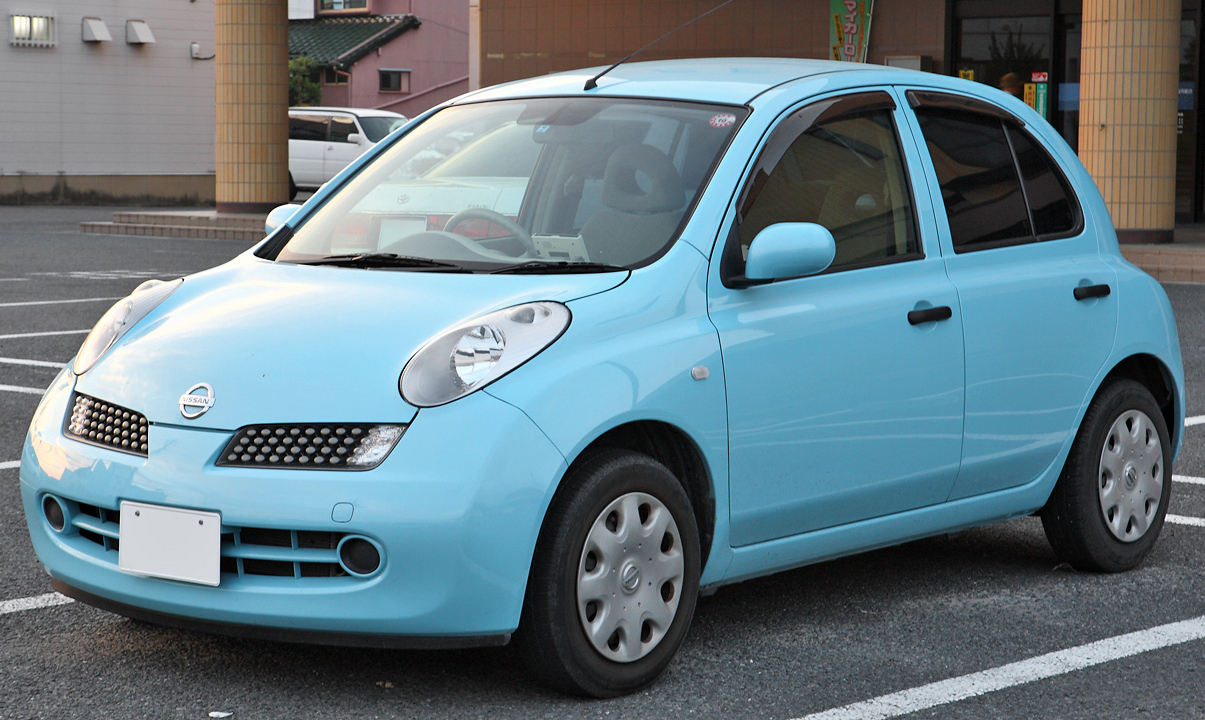
First facelift Nissan March (Japan)

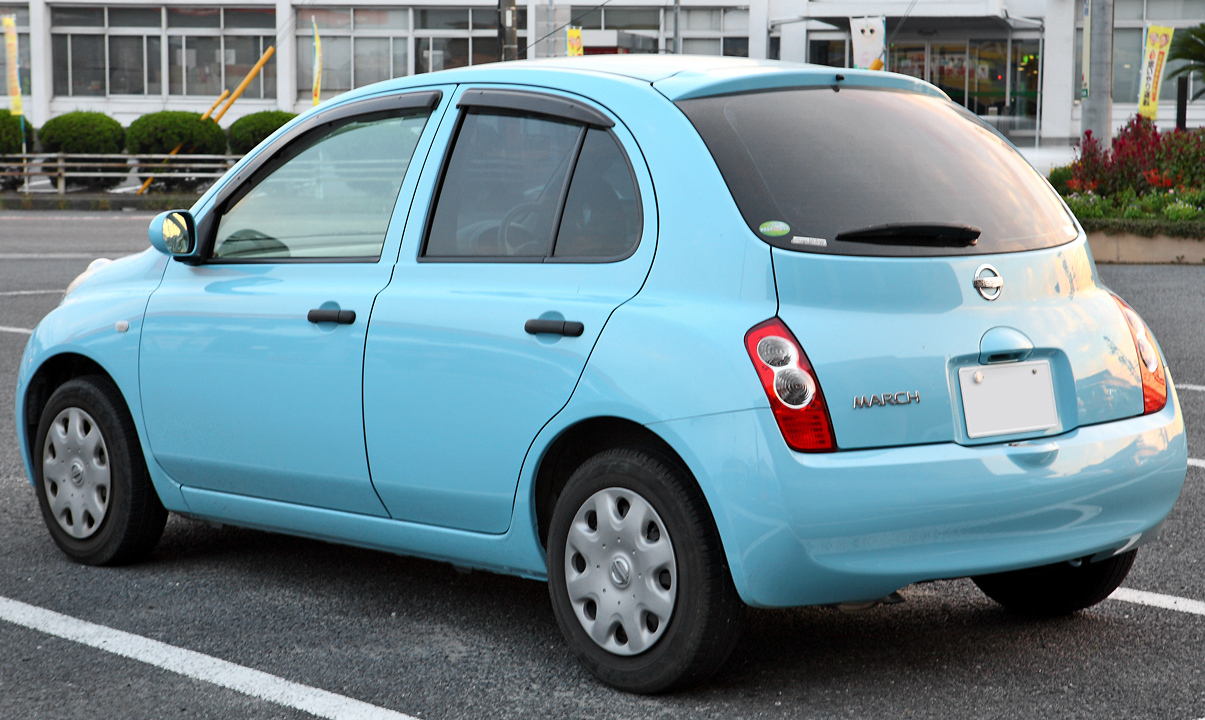
First facelift Nissan March (Japan)

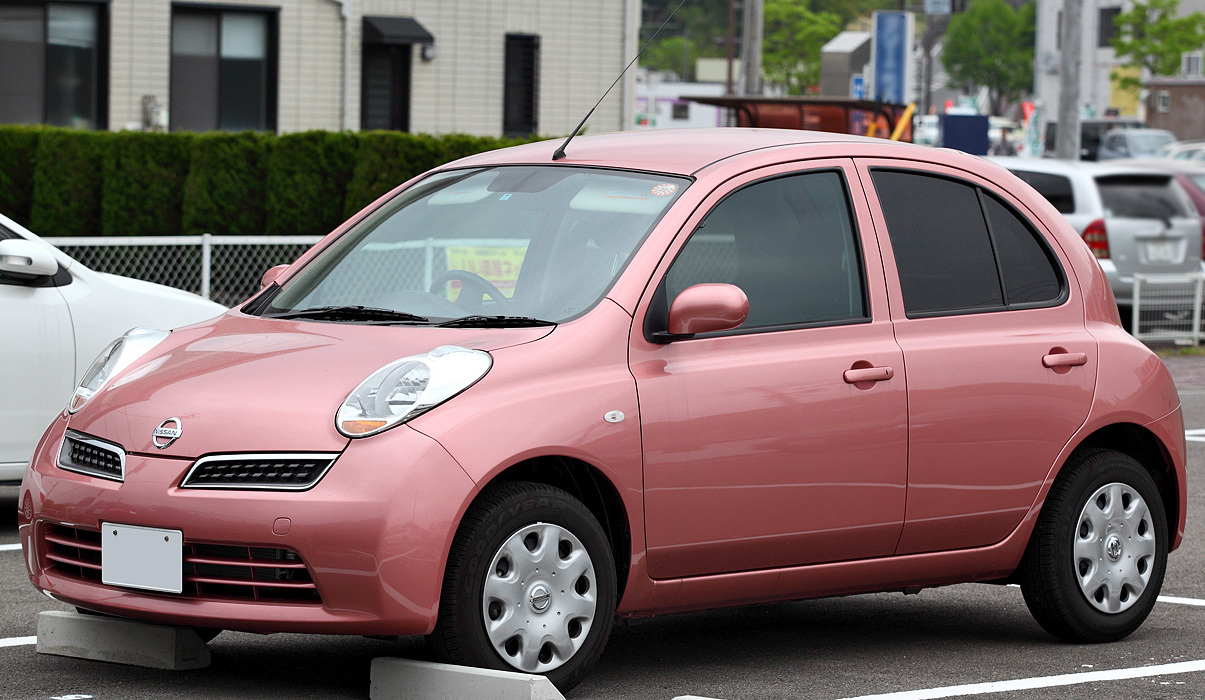
Second facelift Nissan March (Japan)

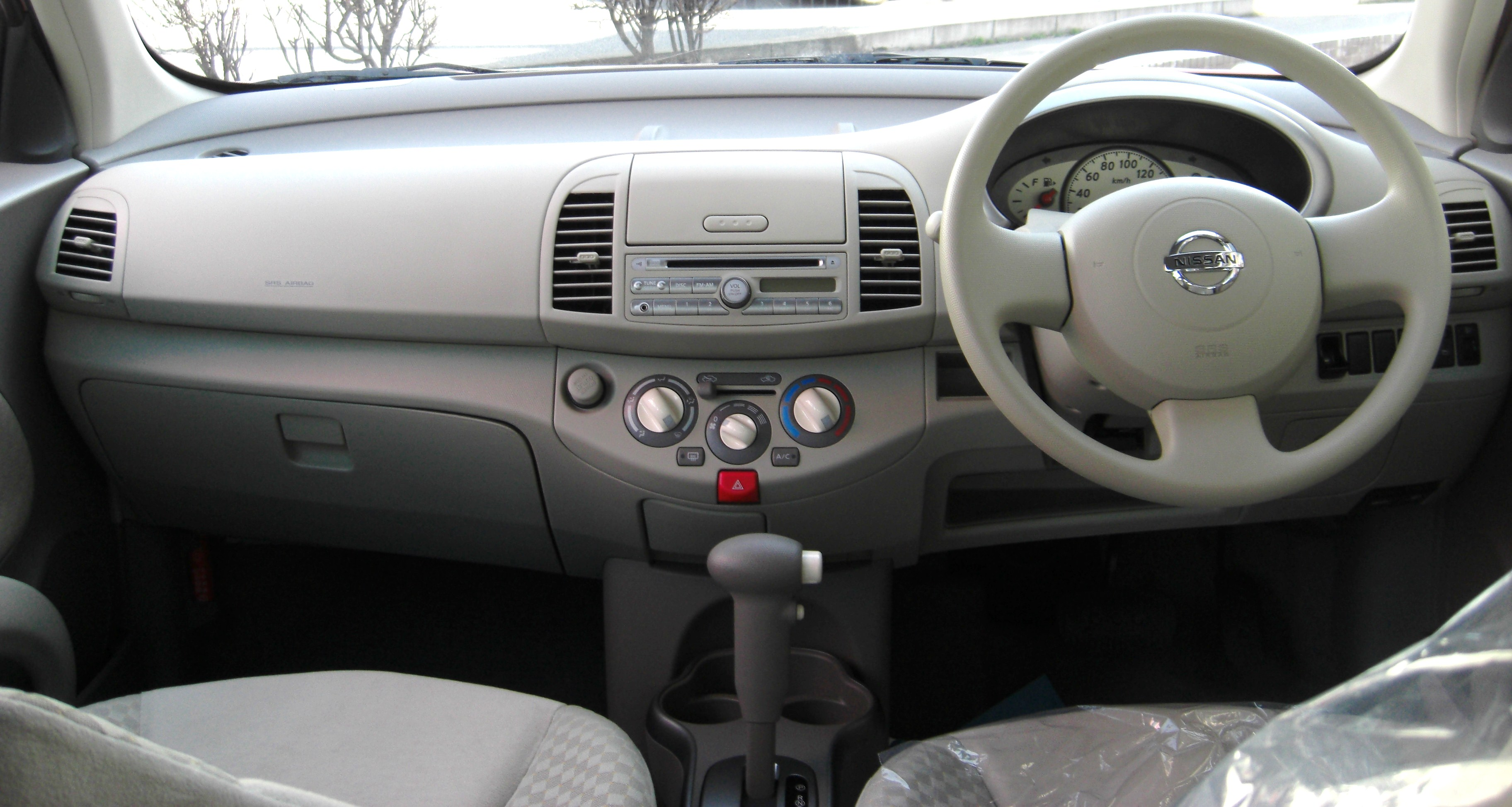
Interior

==== Nissan March Rafeet and 4WD models (2002) ====
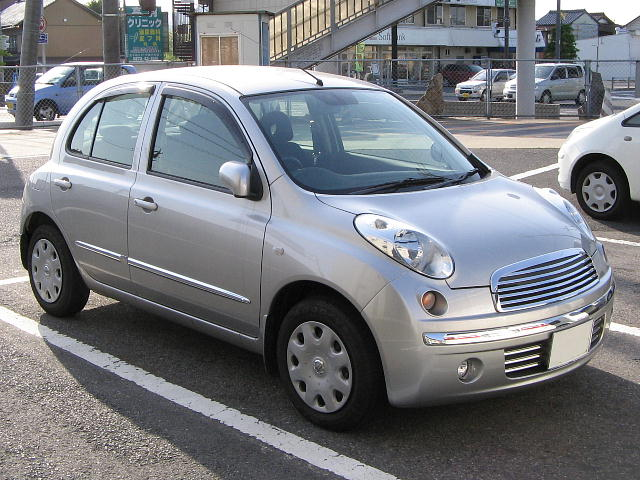
Nissan March Rafeet

The March Rafeet and 4WD models went on sale on 5 September 2002. Early March Rafeet models include the 12c and the 14c-four. Other four wheel drive models included March Enchante (14c-four, 14e-four), March Enchante flip seat (14c-four), and the March Driving Helper (14c-four).

==== Nissan Micra R (2003) ====
In 2003, Nissan UK, inspired by the Andros Trophy K11, unveiled the Micra-R, a one-off mid-engined K12. Shown at the Geneva Motor Show without running gear and engine, being only a display car, it was later given the go-ahead and Nissan commissioned Ray Mallock Ltd to insert a mid-mounted BTCC-derived Primera QG20DE engine for show and press demonstration purposes. In 2005, Nissan UK decided to replace the Primera engine with a VQ35DE from a 350Z with a modified Altima SE-R gearbox for user-friendliness on the road. This model was baptized 350SR, although it was not offered for sale. It was taken on to EVO magazine's "fast fleet" for a period of time where it became a favourite of many of the writers. Other modifications to this car include a vented rear arch and a set of Rays wheels. To date, Nissan has no plans to put this model into production.

=== 2004 update ===
==== Nissan Micra (2004) ====
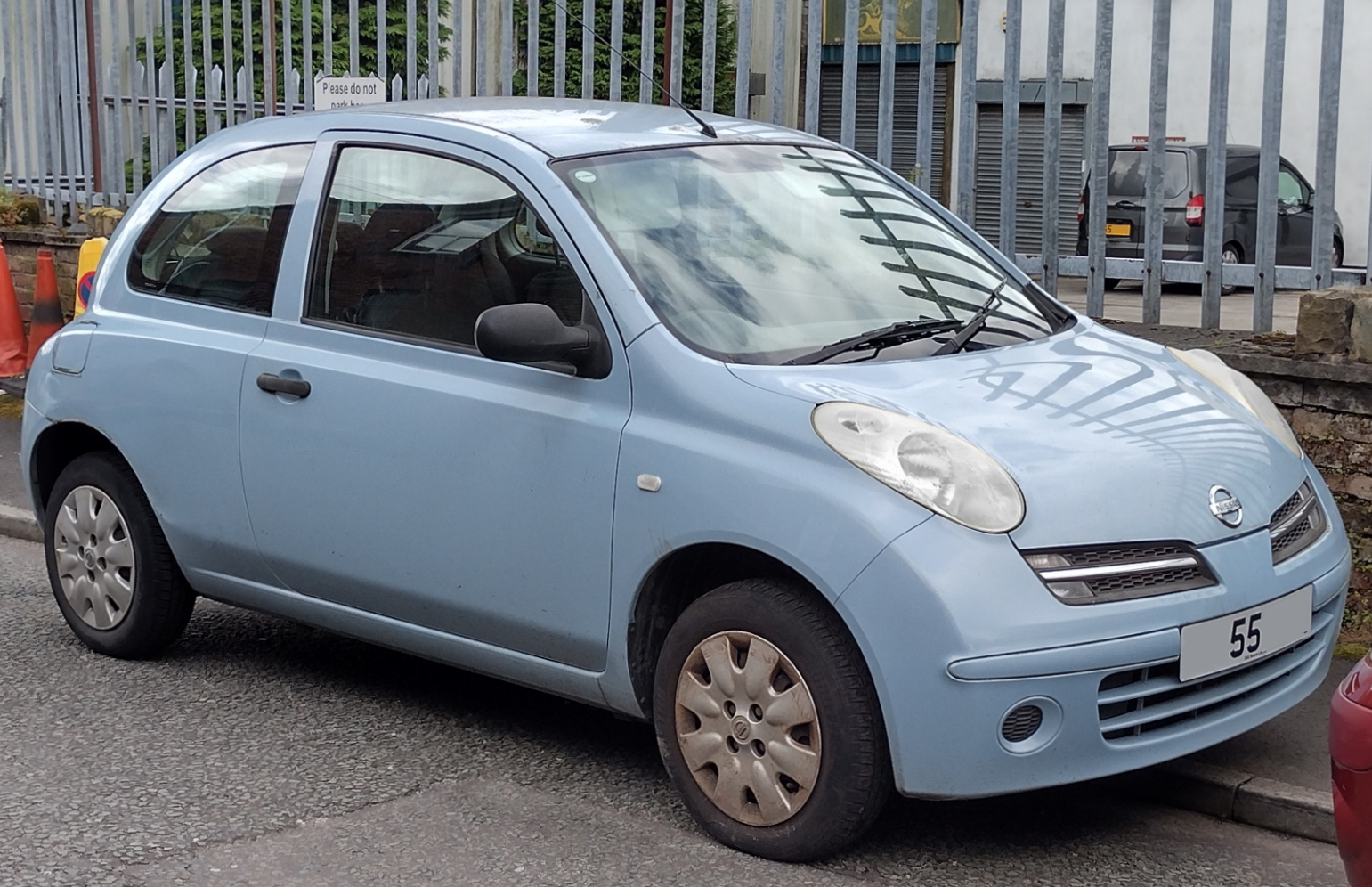
2004 facelift with clear front indicator lamps

Changes include addition of clear front indicator lamps, a new seven-spoke design of 15" wheel covers, body-coloured powered door mirrors and door handles, front seats with improved support, addition of remote controls for the CD audio system and drive computer.

The vehicle was unveiled at the 2004 Paris Motor Show.

==== Bolero, Rafeet ====
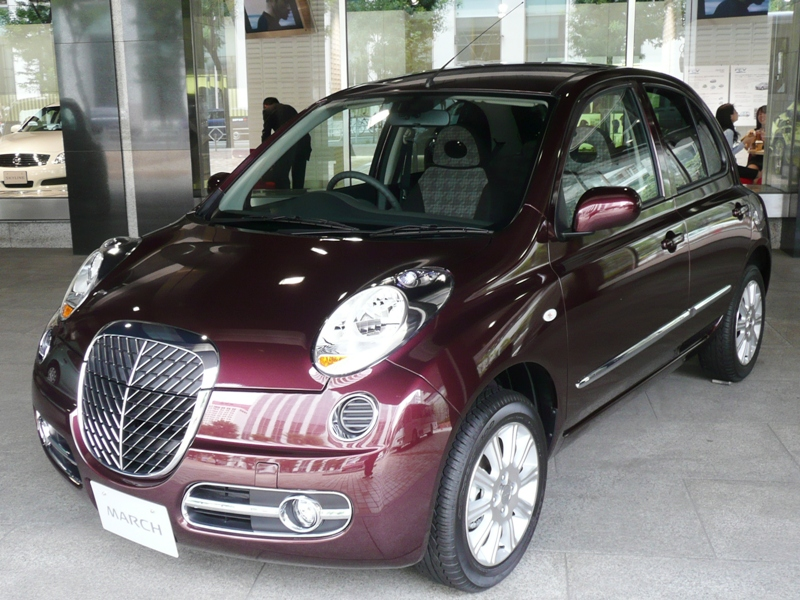
Nissan March Bolero (Japan)

Autech, a Nissan-owned company, unveiled alternative models called the Bolero and the Rafeet. The Bolero, like Autech's versions of the K11, has the usual retro front end (which with the standard Micra headlights makes the car resemble the Lancia Ypsilon); the Rafeet has a more modern approach, resembling a BMW MINI, with either a black or white leather interior, whereas the Bolero has partial wood panelling and exclusive seating.

==== Nissan Micra C+C (2005) ====
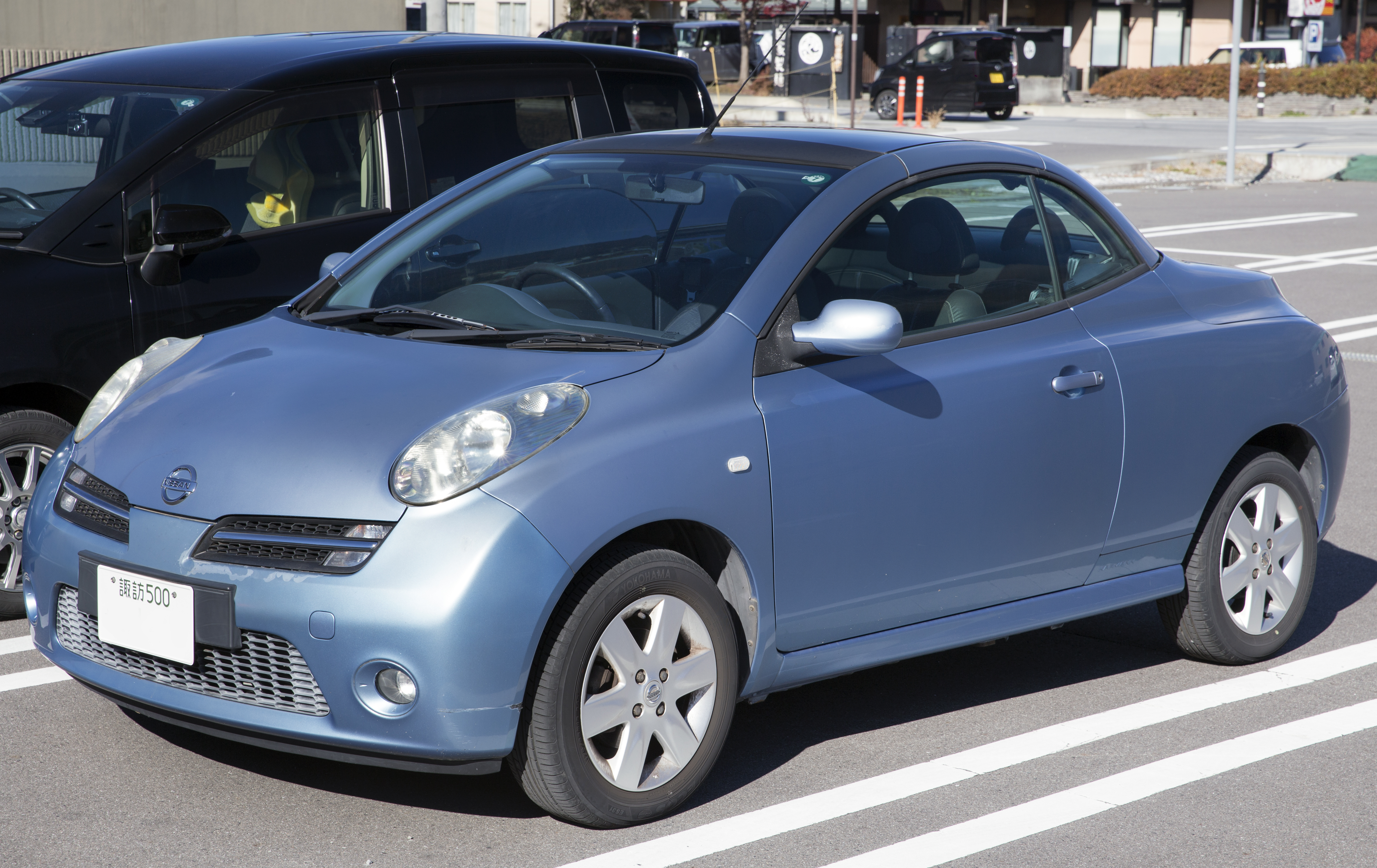

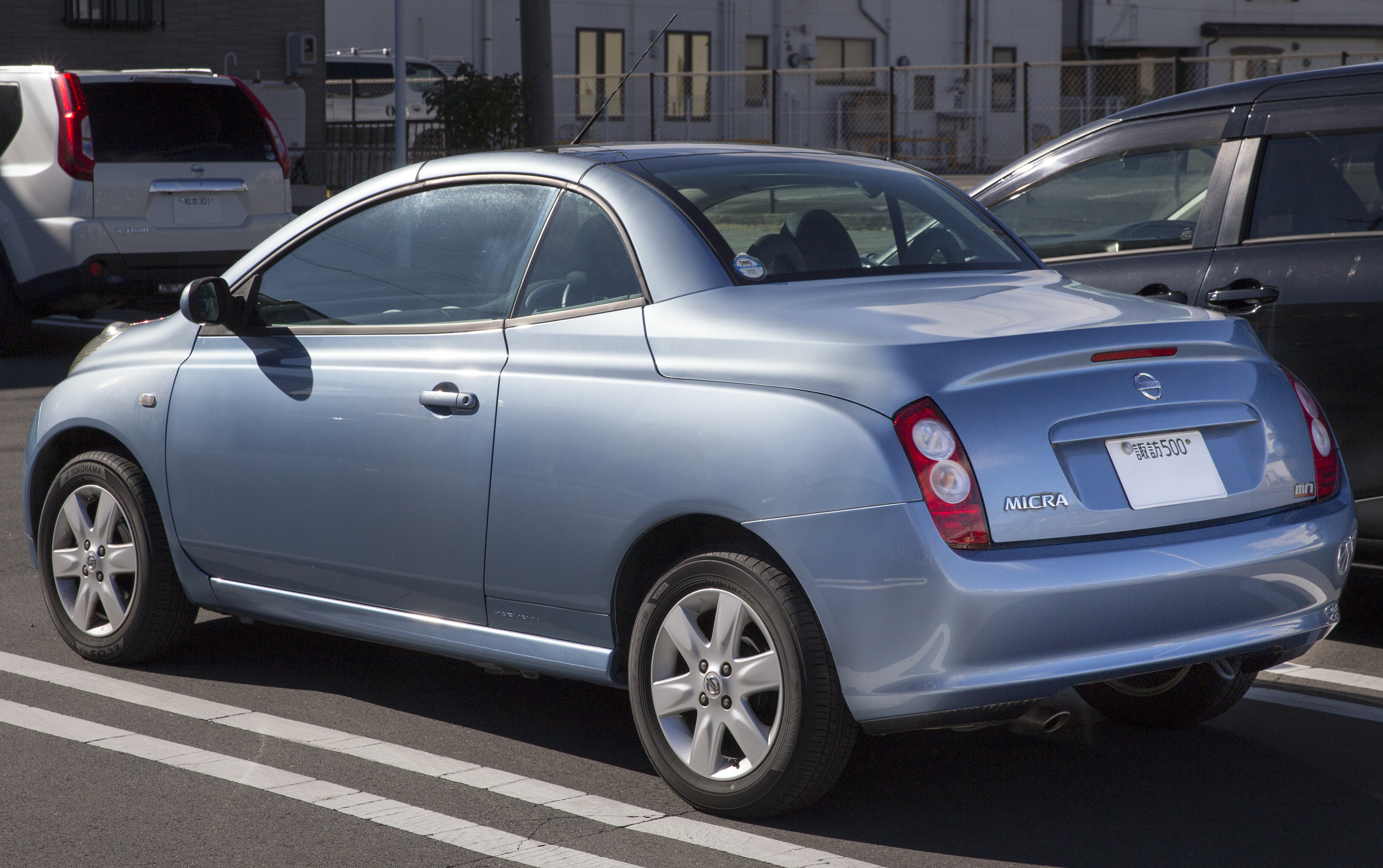
JDM Micra C+C; this version kept the European front license plate carrier

In 2005, the K12 chassis spawned the coupé convertible model called the Nissan Micra C+C. The vehicle was unveiled at the 2005 Frankfurt Motor Show, followed by the 2006 Geneva Motor Show. It was designed at the new London-based Nissan Design Europe studio, developed at the Nissan Technical Centre Europe at Cranfield, Bedfordshire and built, as with its predecessor, at the Sunderland plant. The electric folding glass roof is made by Karmann coachworks and has a 2+2 seating layout. The car is powered by a 1.4 or 1.6 L petrol engine, or a 1.5 L diesel available on continental European versions only. The Japanese-market model went on sale in limited quantities (1500 units) in July 2007, using the European name (Micra C+C) rather than the JDM March badging. It was equipped with the HR16DE engine and a 5-speed manual or 4-speed electronic automatic transmission).

There were originally four trim levels: Urbis, Sport, Essenza and Active Luxury.

In October 2013, Top Gear magazine placed the Micra C+C on its list of "The 13 worst cars of the last 20 years", on the basis that "If you need us to justify its inclusion here, you are not only reading the wrong mag [...] As much fun as sticking chilli-infused toothpicks in your eyes."

=== 2005 update ===
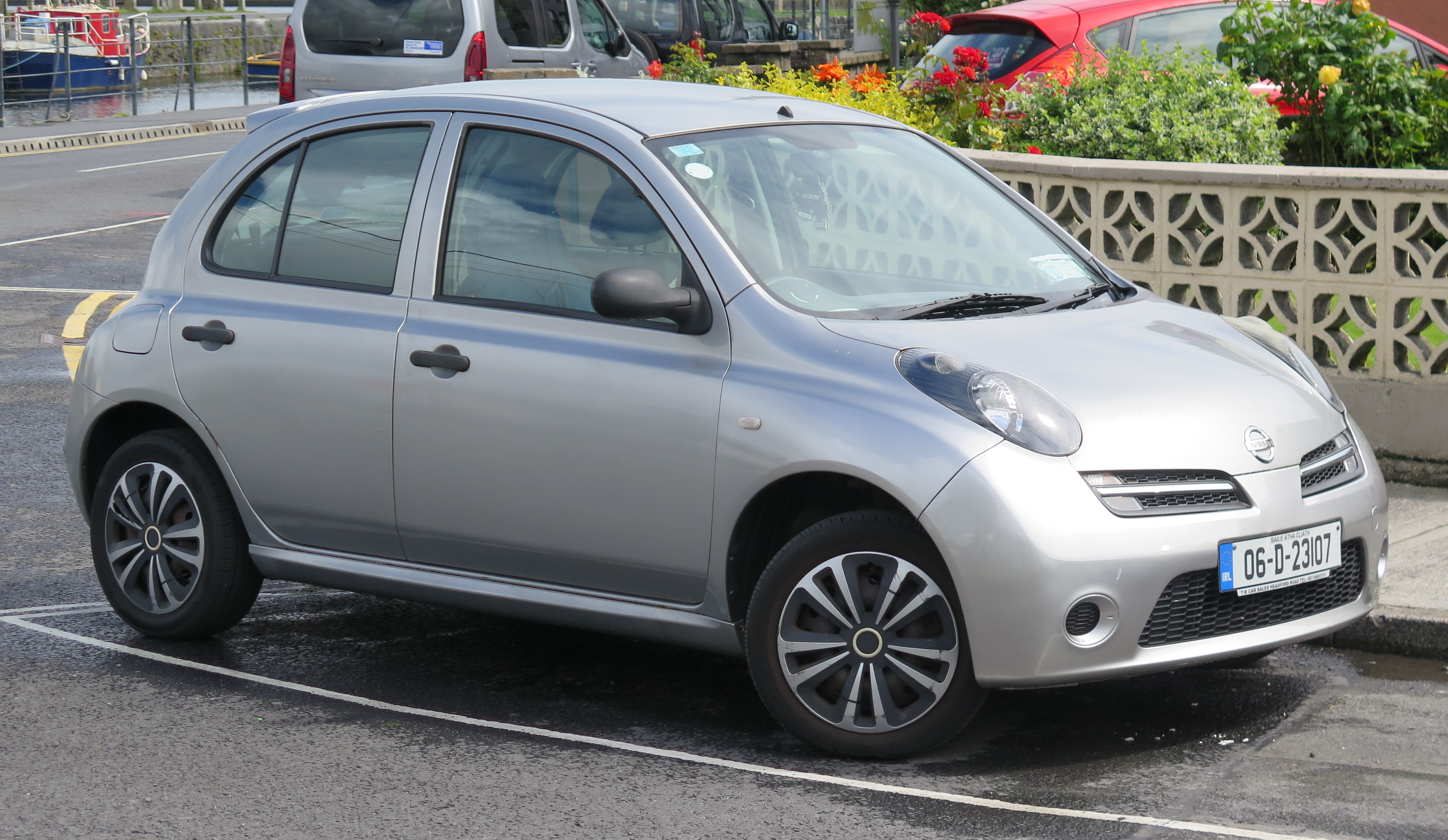
2005 facelift

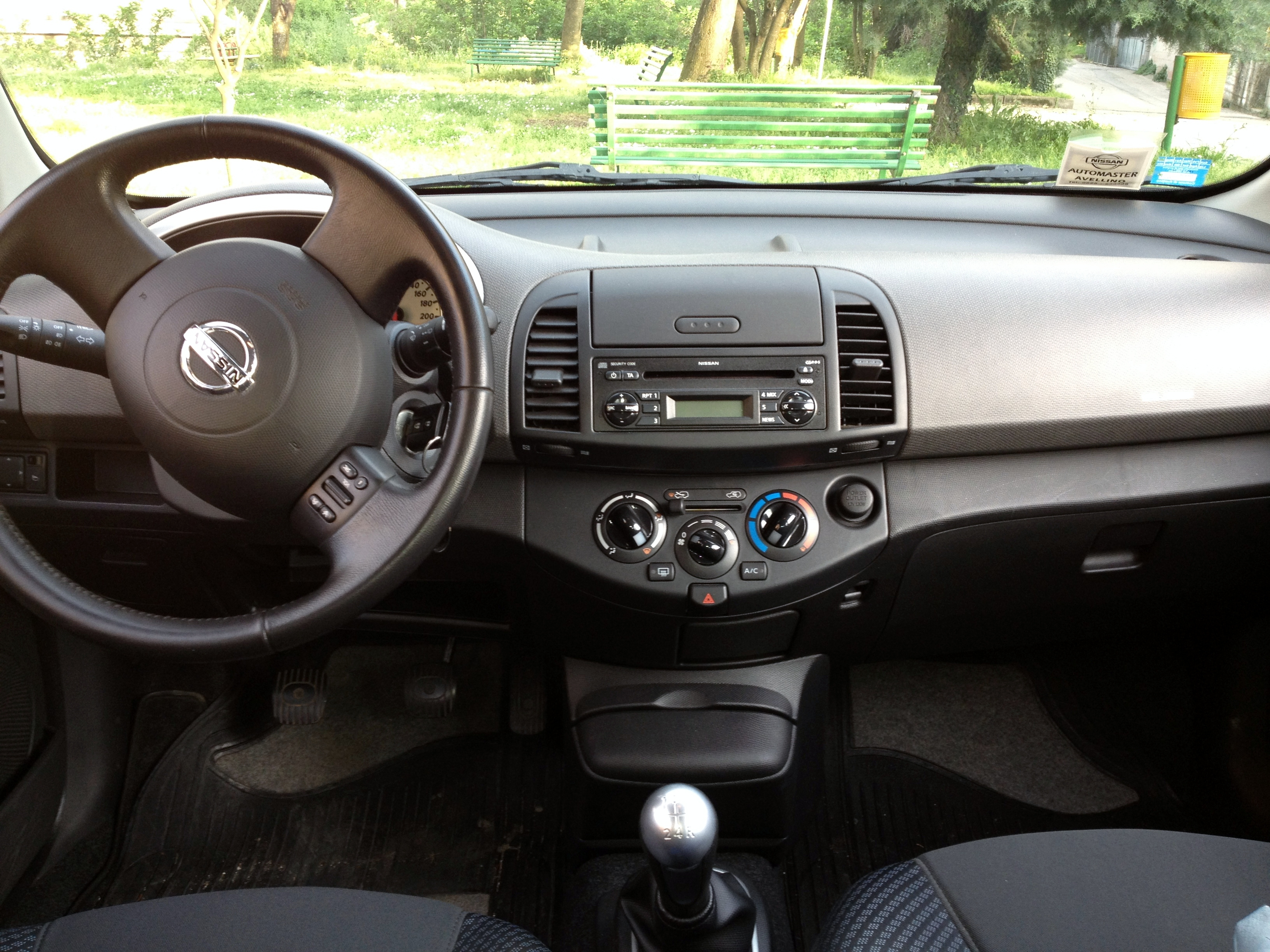
Interior

Changes to Nissan March include:

- Redesigned front grille, front bumper, 14-inch full wheel cover, rear combination lamps, rear bumper
- New seat cloth, reshaped seat
- Added floor trim cloth
- Redesigned meter
- Headlamp manual levellizer (with xenon headlamp auto levellizer)
- Change to HR15DE engine

Micra 12SR is a version of Nissan March with:

- CR12DE engine with stainless exhaust manifold, cylinder head port polish
- Redesigned suspension, power steering assist
- Enlarged front brake rotor
- Tail crossbar
- SR-exclusive front spoiler, rear under protector, large roof spoiler, under body aerodynamic parts
- Exclusive sport seat, meter, aluminium pedal, grade and black interior colour scheme

Japanese models went on sale on 25 August 2005.

==== Nissan Micra 160 SR (2005) ====
In 2005, Nissan Europe released a performance model of the K12. Dubbed the 160 SR, it is equipped with a 1.6 L HR16DE engine, giving 113 PS (83 kW; 111 hp) and uprated sports suspension. In 2006, Nissan renamed the 160 SR to the Sport SR in line with name changes across the board for the K12. However, this rebranding was short-lived: the performance model reverted to the 160 SR name in late 2007.

The launch of the 160 SR coincided with a revision of the K12. The radiator grilles were given a chrome strip through the centre and the original amber indicators were replaced with clear ones. The rear bumper was restyled and made more robust (apparently in response to French parking habits). The interior was also given a makeover, with more supportive seats, thicker glass and better soundproofing.

There were originally six trim levels of the K12, but in 2006 they were simplified to just three: Initia, Spirita and Sport. In addition, the launch line-up of six engines was reduced to the most popular four. The vehicle was unveiled at the 2005 Frankfurt Motor Show.

=== Micra K12C (2007) ===
In late 2007, the Nissan Micra was facelifted again. It had several cosmetic tweaks: every model featured the standard racing grille taken from the K12 160 SR; the front headlights were tidied up (incorporating light blue-tinted sidelights) and the grilles housing the indicators were edged in chrome. Inside, there were new seat fabric designs, and the dashboard featured parts taken from other Nissans. New equipment included an audible speed warning, bluetooth connectivity with the vehicle and reversing sensors. All models (save for entry-level) were fitted with sport bumpers and spoilers on the sides and rear. Larger wing mirrors were also added on some models.

The 1.2-litre engine for the entry-level Visia was a 65 PS (48 kW; 64 hp) unit, as opposed to the 80 PS (59 kW; 79 hp) version on other grades. In addition, the Visia did not have the option of a 1.4 L engine. The 1.6 L engine was reserved for the 160 SR and as an option on the Active Luxury grade.

Starting from 2007, Nissan began selling the K12 in Australia. Imported from Japan, all were five-door hatchbacks, with the 1.4-litre petrol engine and automatic transmission. The only factory option was the City Collection pack, which included an upgraded six-disc sound system, six-spoke alloy wheels, and side and curtain airbags. The Australian specification adopted the Japanese facelift, with indicators integrated into the headlamps.

In 2009, it was reported that a total of 31,600 units were sold in Japan and nearly 122,000 worldwide.

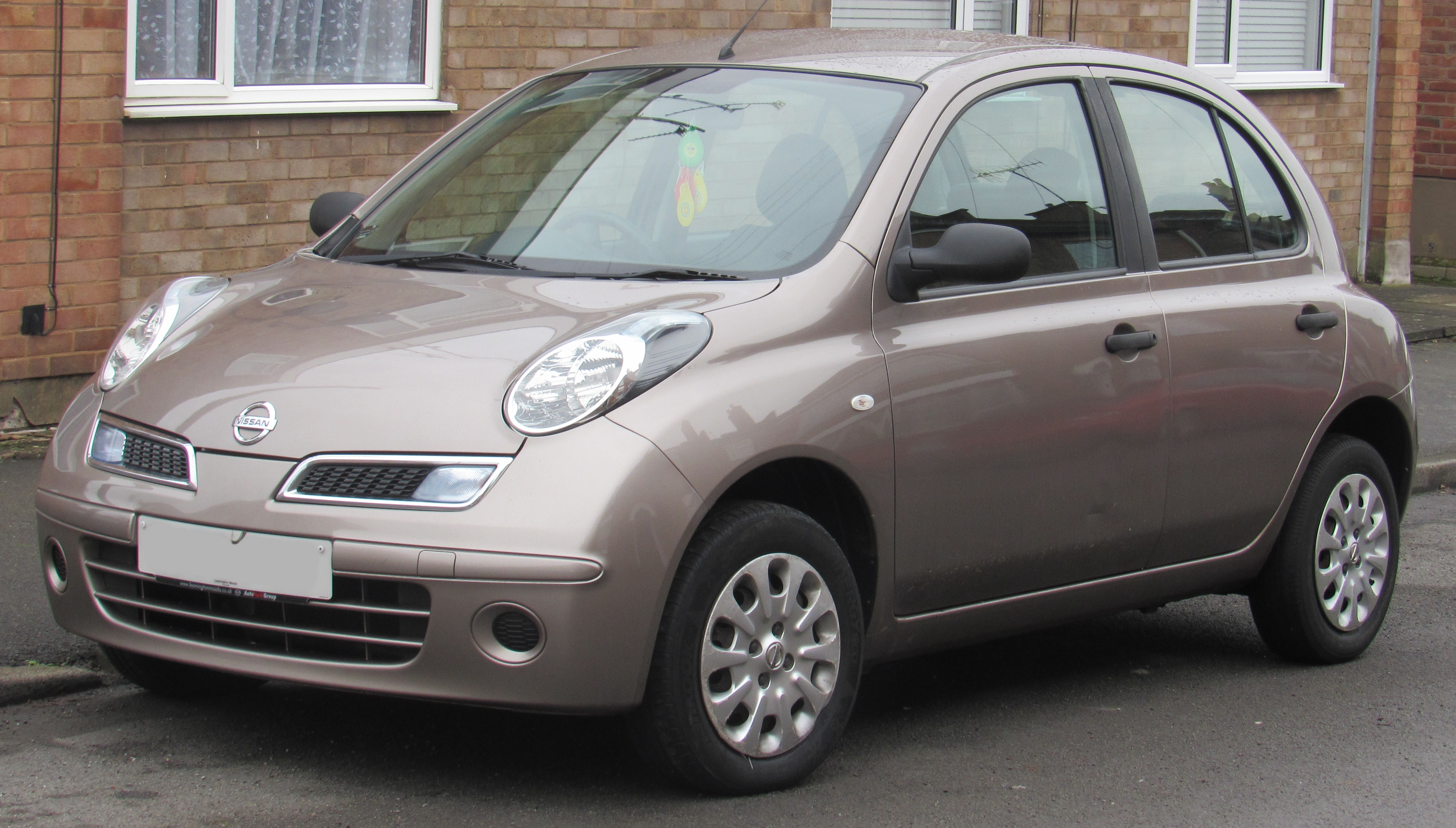
Nissan Micra Visia (UK)

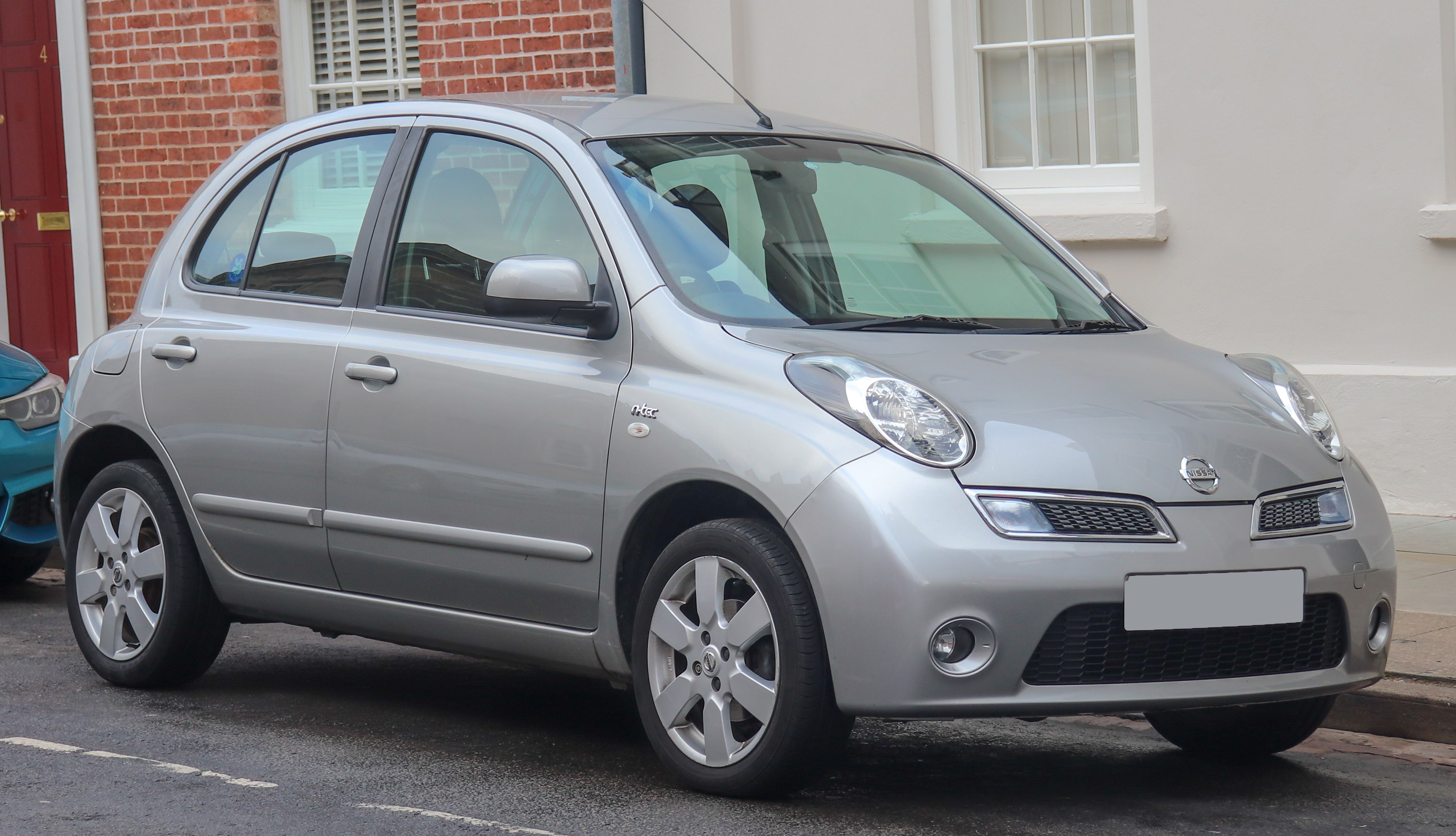
Nissan Micra N-Tec (UK)

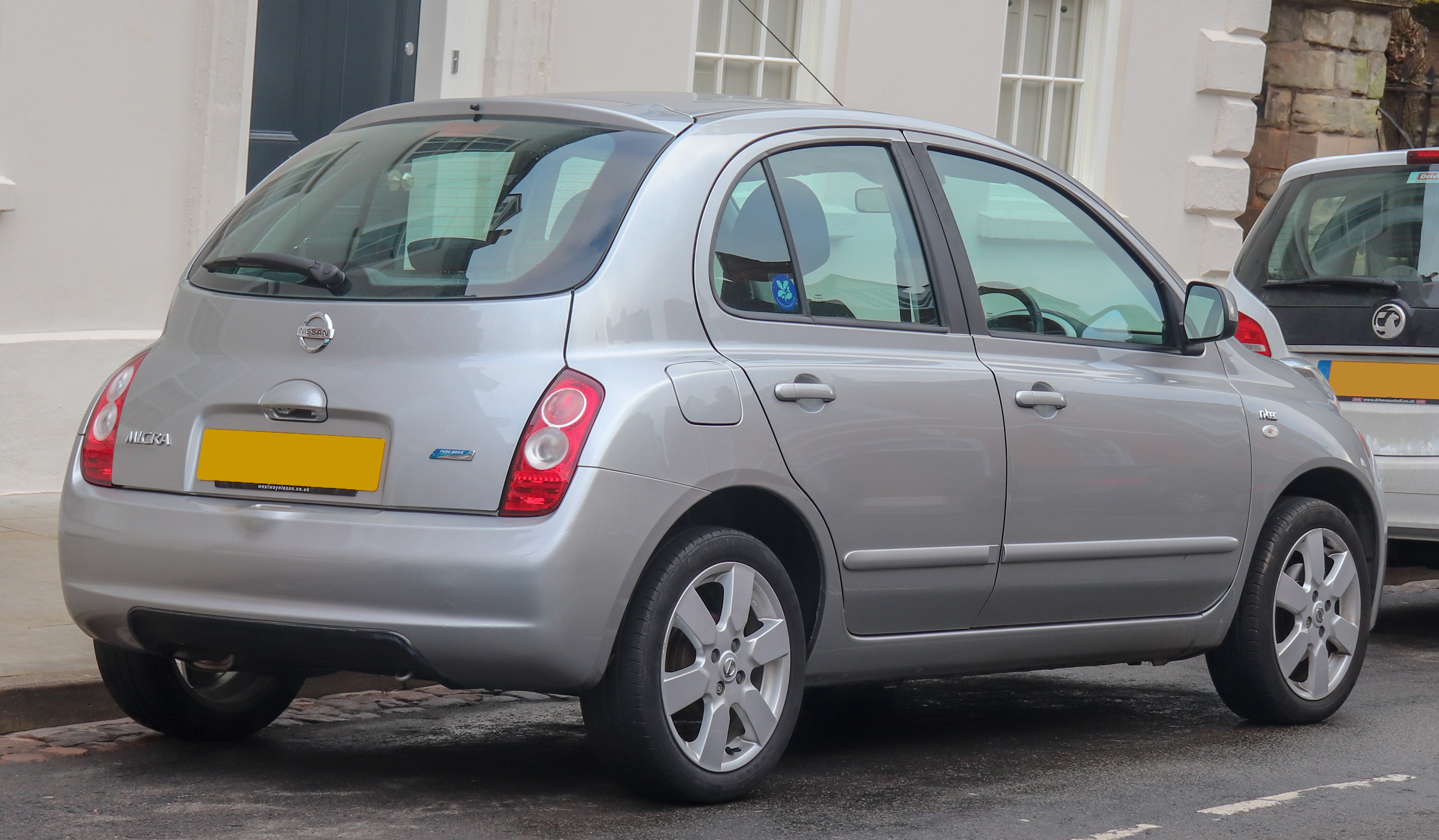
Nissan Micra N-Tec (UK)

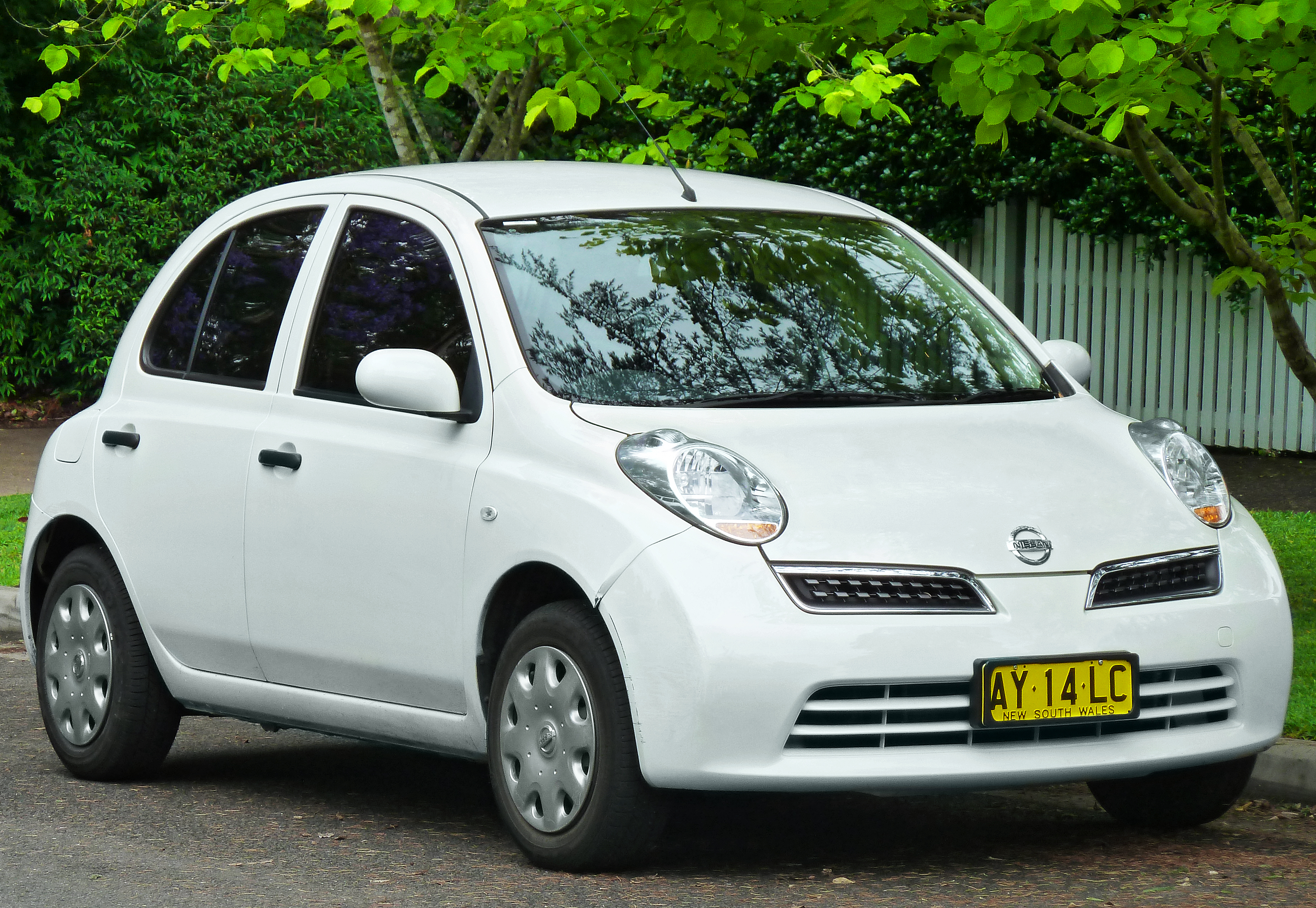
Nissan Micra (Australia; with integrated indicators in headlamps)

=== Safety ===
ANCAP test results Nissan Micra (2008)
Test	Score
Overall	3 /5 stars
Frontal offset	9.26/16
Side impact	12.92/16
Pole	Not Assessed
Seat belt reminders	0/3
Whiplash protection	Not Assessed
Pedestrian protection	Marginal
Electronic stability control	Not Available

== Fourth generation (K13; 2010) ==
Fourth generation
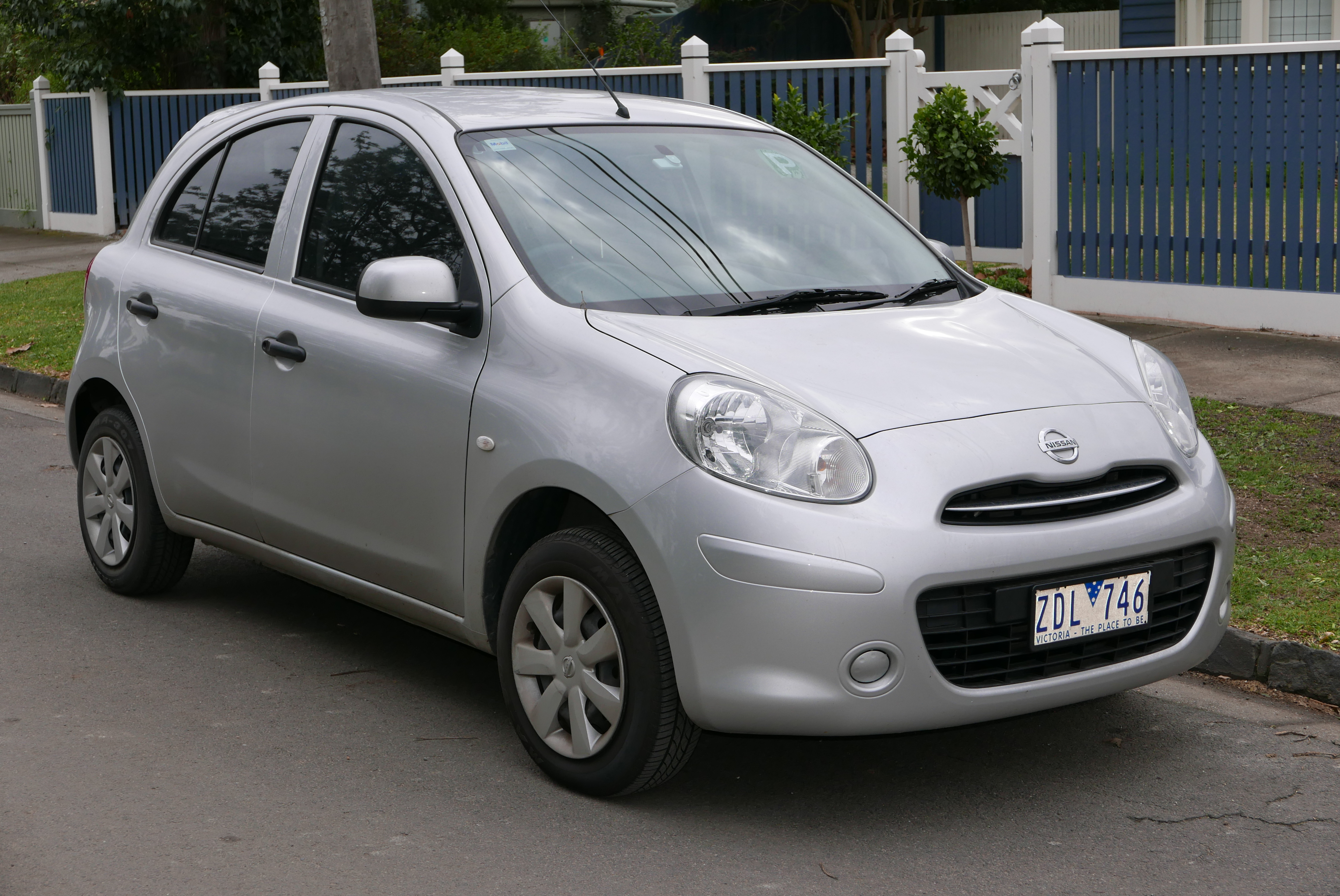
- 2012 Nissan Micra ST hatchback (pre-facelift, Australia)

Overview
- Model code: K13
- Also called: Nissan March; Renault Pulse (India)
- Production: March 2010 – July 2022 (Thailand); May 2010 – April 2020 (India); October 2011 – September 2020 (Brazil); March 2011 – present (Mexico)
- Assembly: Thailand: Samut Prakan; Mexico: Aguascalientes (Nissan Mexicana, A1); Brazil: Resende, Rio de Janeiro; China: Guangzhou (Dongfeng Nissan); India: Chennai (Renault Nissan India); Indonesia: Purwakarta (NMI); Taiwan: Miaoli (Yulon)
- Designer: Kenji Yamamoto, Tooru Odagiri, and Yuusuke Kojima

Body and chassis
- Body style: 5-door hatchback
- Layout: Front-engine, front-wheel-drive layout or four-wheel-drive (Nissan E-4WD)
- Platform: Nissan V platform
- Related: Nissan Almera/Versa/Sunny/Latio (N17); Nissan Note (E12); Datsun Go; Venucia R30; Mitsuoka Viewt

Powertrain
- Engine: Petrol: 1.0 L HR10DE I3; 1.0 L D4D I4; 1.2 L HR12DE I3; 1.2 L HR12DDR supercharged I3; 1.5 L HR15DE I4; 1.6 L HR16DE I4; Diesel: 1.5 L K9K turbo I4
- Transmission: 5-speed manual 4-speed automatic CVT

Dimensions
- Wheelbase: 2,450 mm (96.5 in)
- Length: 3,780–3,870 mm (148.8–152.4 in)
- Width: 1,665–1,690 mm (65.6–66.5 in)
- Height: 1,495–1,525 mm (58.9–60.0 in)
- Curb weight: 915–1,040 kg (2,017–2,293 lb)

The first sketches of the fourth generation Nissan Micra, first internally referred as W02A as the development code and as K13 for the model code, were unveiled on 1 October 2009. The car was first displayed at the 80th Geneva International Motor Show.

It was sold in more than 160 countries, including Thailand from March 2010, India from July 2010, Europe from November 2010, and Indonesia from December 2010. It was the first March/Micra to be built in a North American plant, even though this generation did not have any sales in the United States. The K13 was however available in Canada after the spring of 2014.

It is based on the V platform with a new 1.2-litre HR12DE (XH5) 59 kW (79 hp) 108 N⋅m (80 ft⋅lbf), 3-cylinder engine (the first for a March/Micra). In the end of 2011 Nissan introduced the supercharged version of 1.2 (HR12DDR) called in Europe as Micra 1.2 DIG-S and the other engine 1.5 (HR15DE) and 1.6 (HR16DE) for the South American, Asian and Australian markets. The car was expected to be fuel efficient, delivering 18 km to a litre of petrol. The new idling stop system was reported to improve fuel economy by 2.0 km/L. It features variable control of voltage for power generation with an alternator (including regenerative charging function with braking energy).

The Micra's coefficient of drag is just 0.32 achieved in part by the sleek roofline, with a raised rear end, which optimally adjusts airflow to the rear sides and other elements of the body designed to reduce air resistance such as door mirrors, a large front spoiler and the underbody configuration. A lightweight roof panel helps to keep weight to 915 kg (2,017 lb).

The Nissan March was unveiled at the 2010 Bangkok International Motor Show, followed by 2010 Beijing International Automobile Exhibition, and Nissan Global Headquarter gallery.

In 2021, it is only marketed in Mexico. It undergoes a significant redesign in the country along with a technological update.

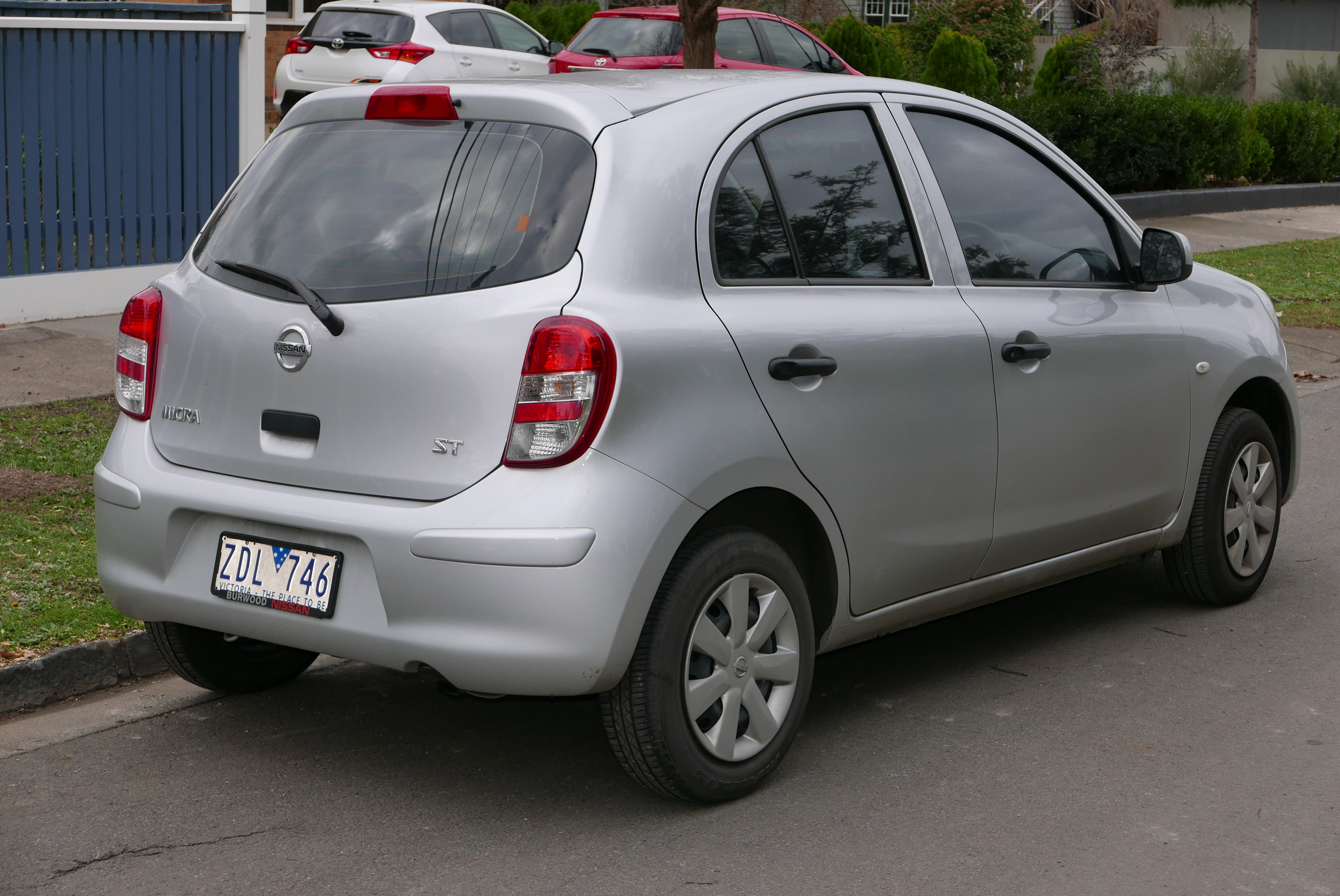
Rear view

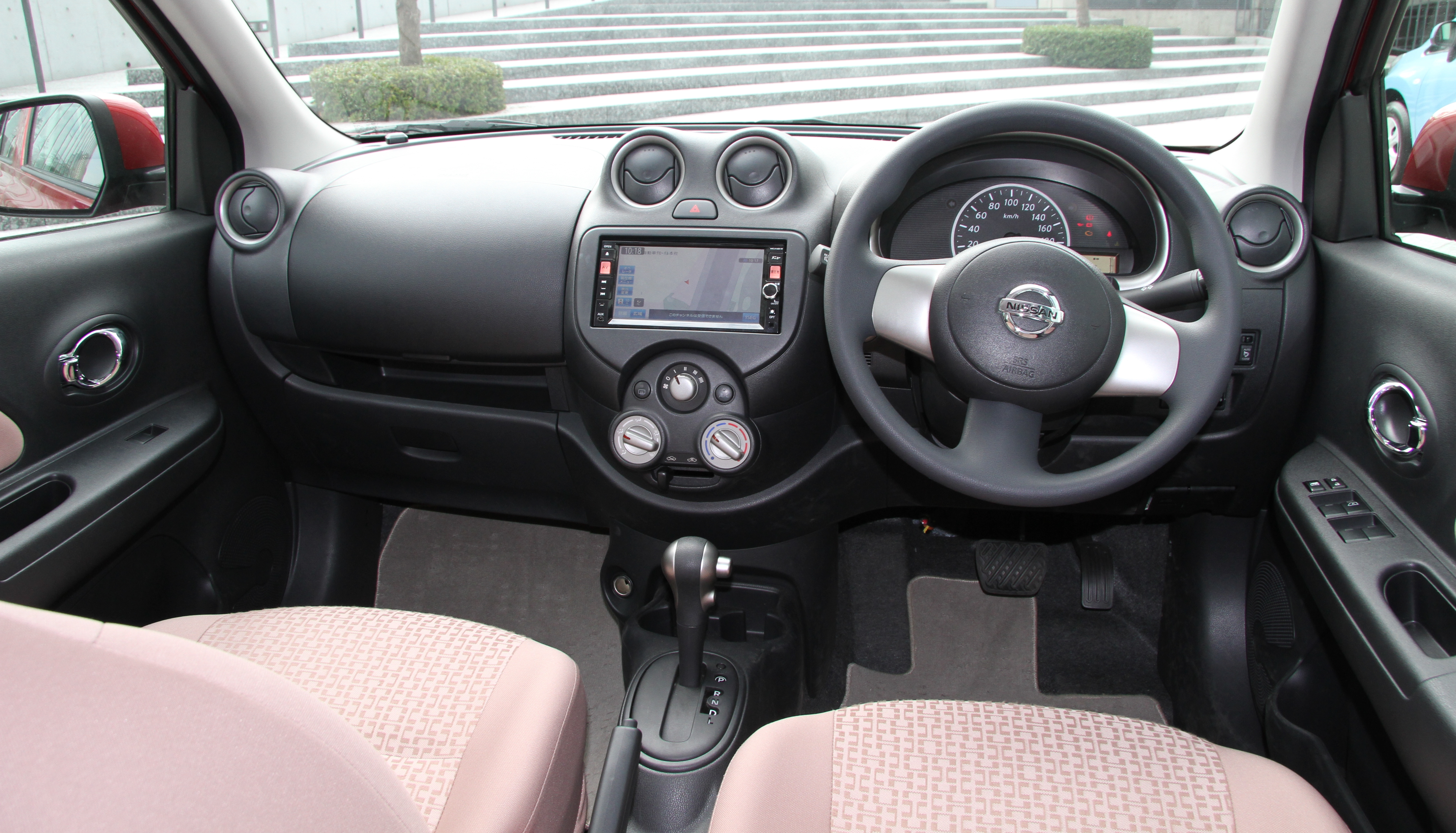
Interior (pre-facelift)

=== Production ===
At its launch, Nissan announced that the model would be produced in at least five countries. On 12 March 2010, Nissan Motor Thailand (NMT) began production of the March, making it the first vehicle to qualify for Thailand's Eco Car tax incentives. The Thai-produced March went on sale in the Japanese market in July 2010.

The Micra commenced production in India on 24 May 2010 at the Renault Nissan India (RNAIPL) manufacturing plant in Oragadam, Tamil Nadu. Domestic sales in India began in July 2010, followed by exports in September 2010. Exports to Europe started in October 2010. On 16 June 2011, the Chennai plant reached the milestone of producing its 100,000th Micra. The Renault Pulse was also manufactured at this facility. Production of the Micra in India ceased in April 2020 due to the implementation of Bharat Stage 6 emissions regulations.

Assembly of the March in Purwakarta, Indonesia, began in October 2010. In addition to serving the domestic market, Nissan Motor Indonesia (NMI) exported the March to Australia under the Micra name. The domestic March was equipped with a 1.2-litre HR12DE engine, while the Australian Micra featured a 1.5-litre HR15DE engine. Production in Indonesia ended in 2013, with units thereafter imported from Thailand.

Production of the March began in Aguascalientes, Mexico in February 2011.

Production of the March in China by Dongfeng Nissan started in 2010, and ended in 2015 due to low sales.

At the end of May 2011, global sales of the Nissan Micra/March surpassed six million units.

In October 2011, production of the K13 Micra began in Brazil. It continued until September 2020.

In July 2022, Nissan Motor Thailand ended production of the March after an 11-year production run. Consequently, in August 2022, Nissan discontinued sales of the Thailand-imported March in Japan as the company shifted its focus to the Nissan Note and the promotion of electrification across its model lineup.

As of 2024, the K13 Micra/March continued to be produced in Mexico.

=== Markets ===
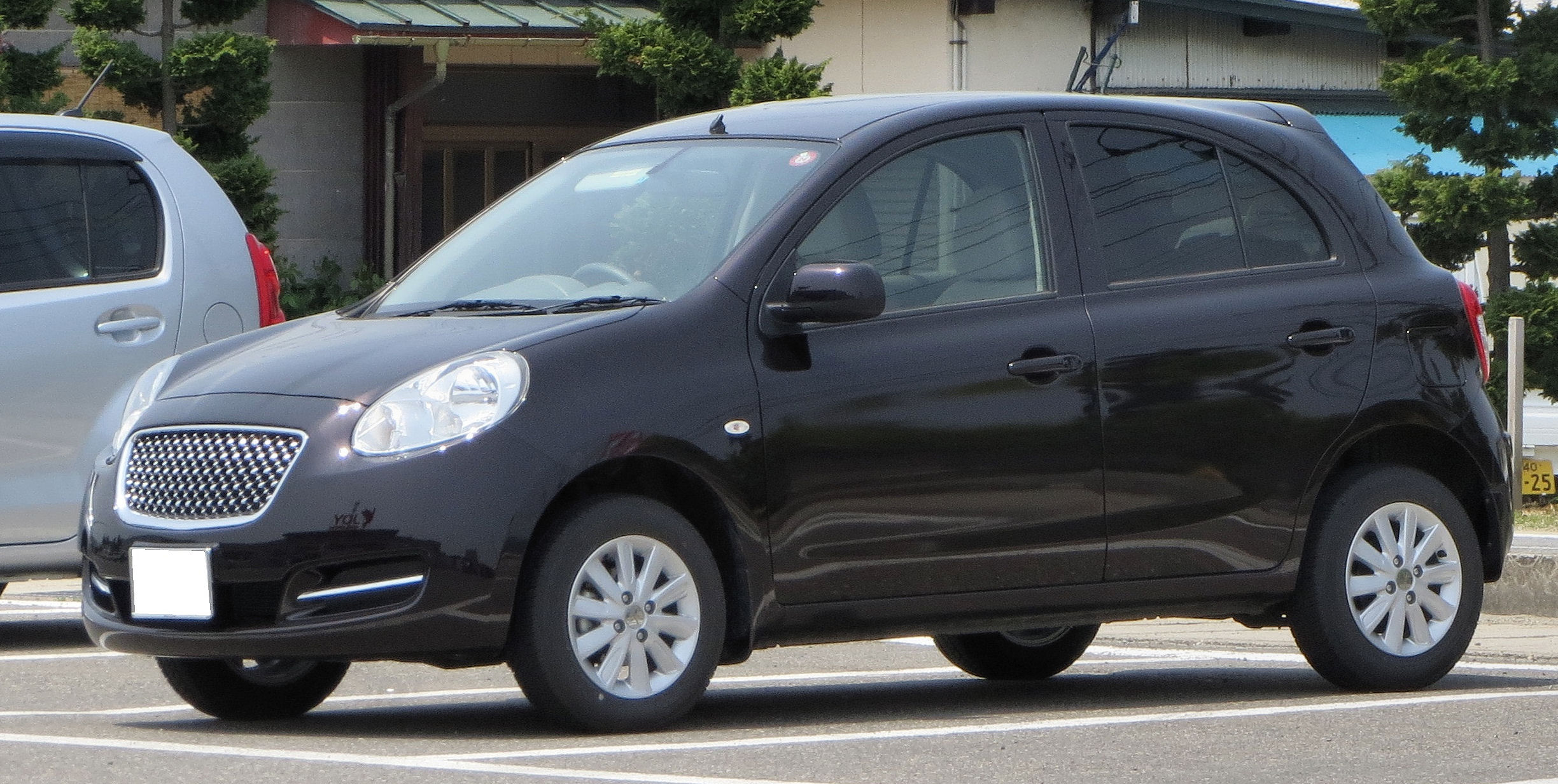
Nissan March Bolero (Japan)

The Japanese model went on sale on 13 July 2010, with the units sourced from Thailand. Early models include 1.2L 3-cylinder HR12DE engine, Xtronic CVT with an auxiliary two-speed transmission, Idling Stop (standard on 12X and 12G).

The 2014 Montreal Auto Show announced a Canadian model imported from Mexico, with some of the changes being made, such as featuring a different dashboard design borrowed from the US-spec Versa and a single glovebox instead of an upper one, as well as orange side markers that were implemented into the headlights in order to comply with Canadian safety standards. It is equipped with ducts for rear-seat heating, a 60/40 split folding rear seat, heated side mirrors, and front and rear sway bars for the suspension. It went on sale as a 2015 model year vehicle. Early models include a 1.6-litre four-cylinder engine from the Versa, a 4-speed automatic or 5-speed manual transmission, and 15- and 16-inch wheels.

=== Safety ===
The Latin American March has ventilated front disc brakes.

==== Latin NCAP ====
The March in its most basic Latin American market configuration with 2 airbags received 2 stars for adult occupants and 1 star for toddlers from Latin NCAP 1.0 in 2011.

Latin NCAP 1.0 test results Nissan March + 2 Airbags (2011, based on Euro NCAP 1997)
Test	Points	Stars
Adult occupant:	7.62/17.0	2 /5 stars
Child occupant:	9.68/49.00	1 /5 stars

The March in its most basic Latin American market configuration with 2 airbags, no ABS and no ESC received 3 stars for adult occupants and 2 stars for toddlers from Latin NCAP 1.0 in 2016.

Latin NCAP 2.0 test results Nissan March + 2 Airbags (2016, based on Euro NCAP 2008)
Test	Points	Stars
Adult occupant:	8.00/34.0	3 /5 stars
Child occupant:	10.71/49.00	1 /5 stars

The March in its most basic Latin American market configuration with 2 airbags, no ABS and no ESC received 1 star for adult occupants and 2 stars for toddlers from Latin NCAP 2.0 in 2018.

Latin NCAP 2.0 test results Nissan March + 2 Airbags (2018, based on Euro NCAP 2008)
Test	Points	Stars
Adult occupant:	20.11/34.0	1 /5 stars
Child occupant:	21.42/49.00	2 /5 stars

==== ANCAP ====
ANCAP test results Nissan Micra all variants with a 1.2L or 1.5L engine (2011)
Test	Score
Overall	4 /5 stars
Frontal offset	12.79/16
Side impact	15.32/16
Pole	2/2
Seat belt reminders	1/3
Whiplash protection	Good
Pedestrian protection	Adequate
Electronic stability control	Standard

==== ASEAN NCAP ====
ASEAN NCAP test results Nissan March (2012)
Test	Points	Stars
Adult occupant:	11.66	4 /5 stars
Child occupant:	48%	0 /5 stars
Safety assist:	NA	

=== Facelift ===
The 2013 facelift of the Micra was unveiled at the 2013 Frankfurt Motor Show. Changes to the Nissan Micra include new exterior styling front and rear (new grille with Nissan badge 'held' within a chromed extended V-shaped motif, new bonnet, wings, headlamps and front bumper; front fog lamps and chrome surround, a new bumper, new LED tail lamps and a new infill panel at the bottom of the tailgate), new 15-inch alloy wheel design (optional machine-finished 16-inch alloy wheels), instrument graphics ahead of the driver have been improved for greater clarity, a new centre console with restyled air vents, gloss black finish on the centre console, a silver look to the gear selector finisher, textured door armrests, new seat and door pad fabrics.

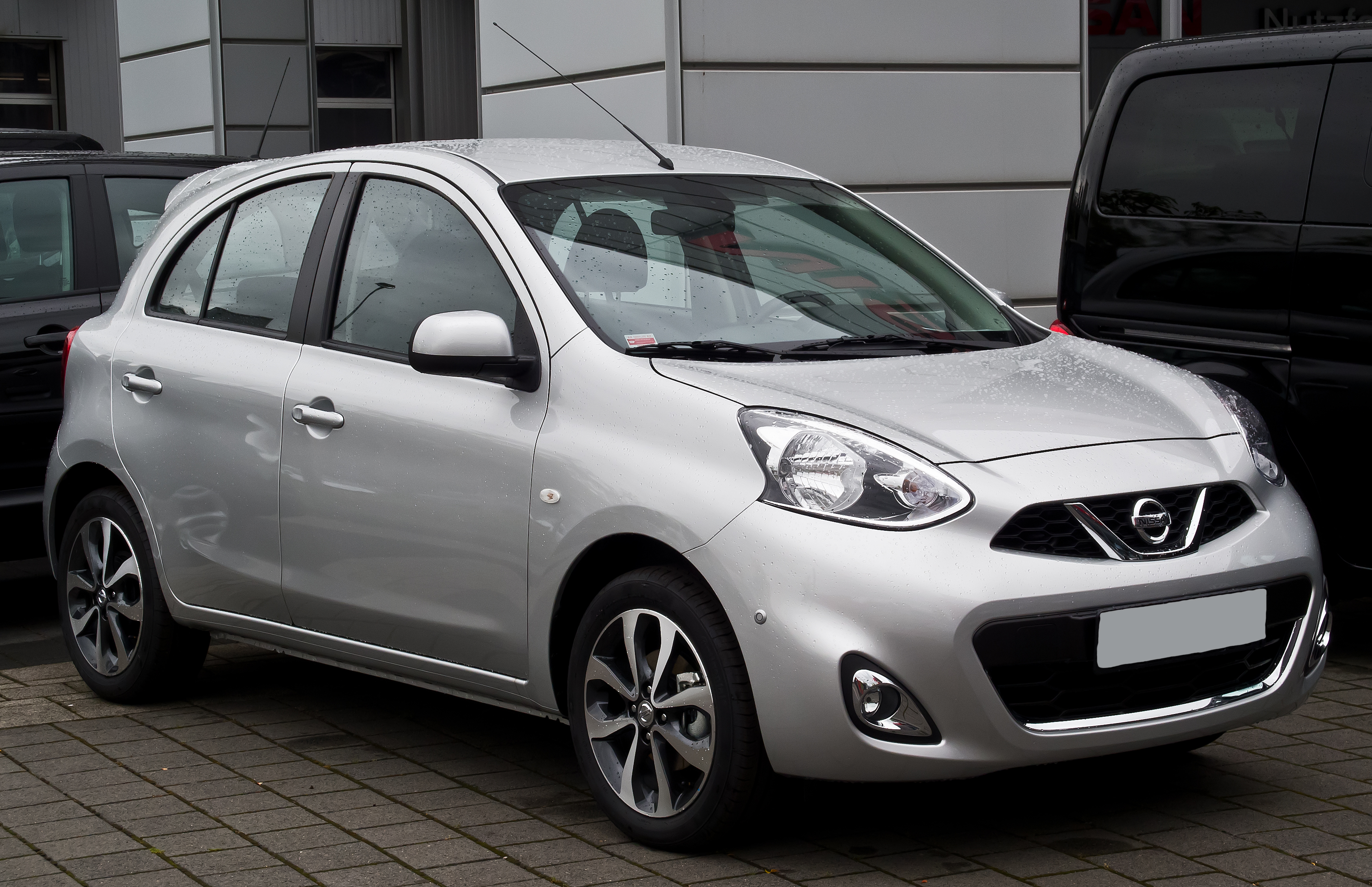
2014 Nissan Micra (Western Europe and UK; global 2013 facelift)

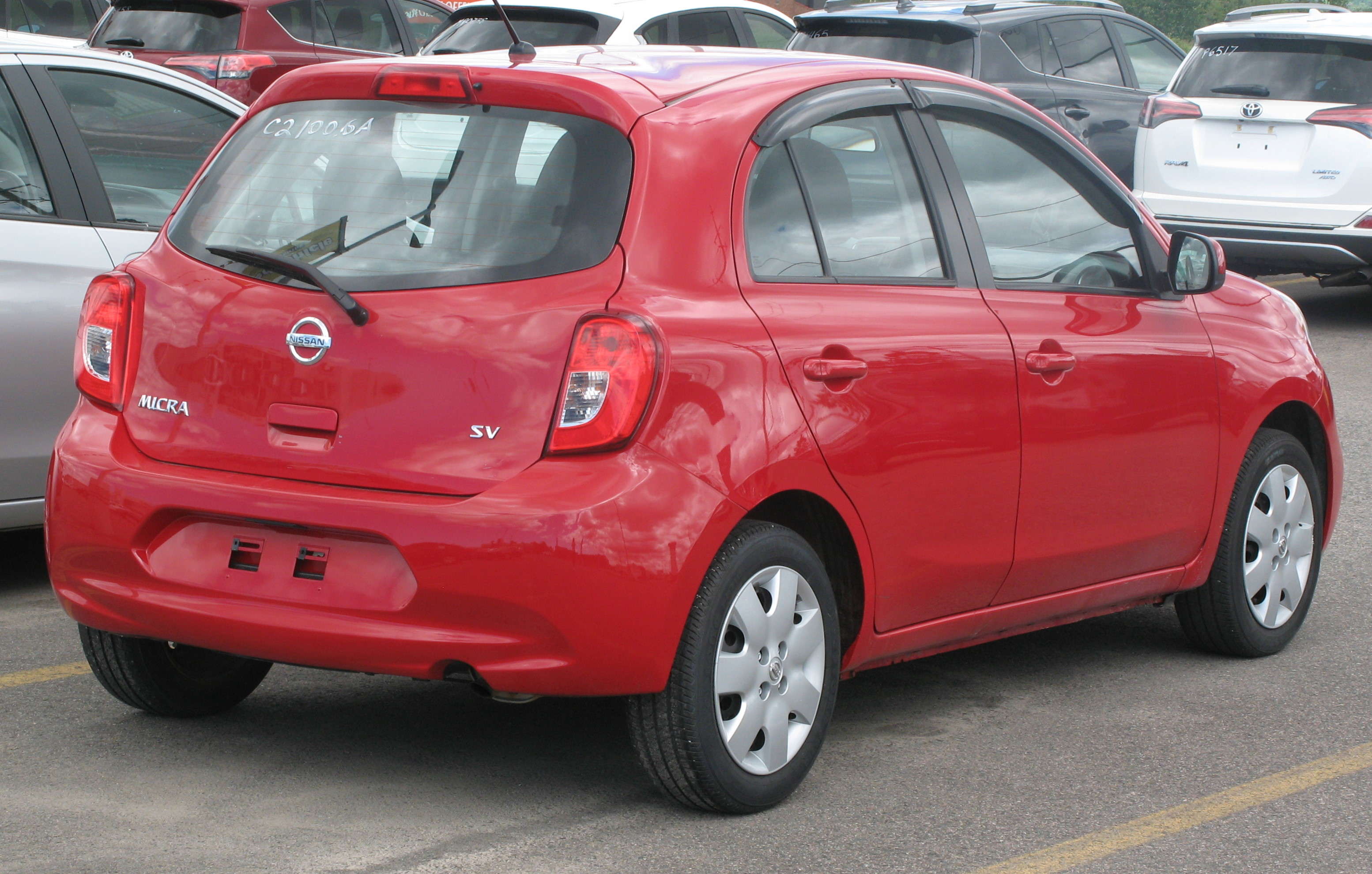
2016 Nissan Micra SV (Canada; global 2013 facelift)

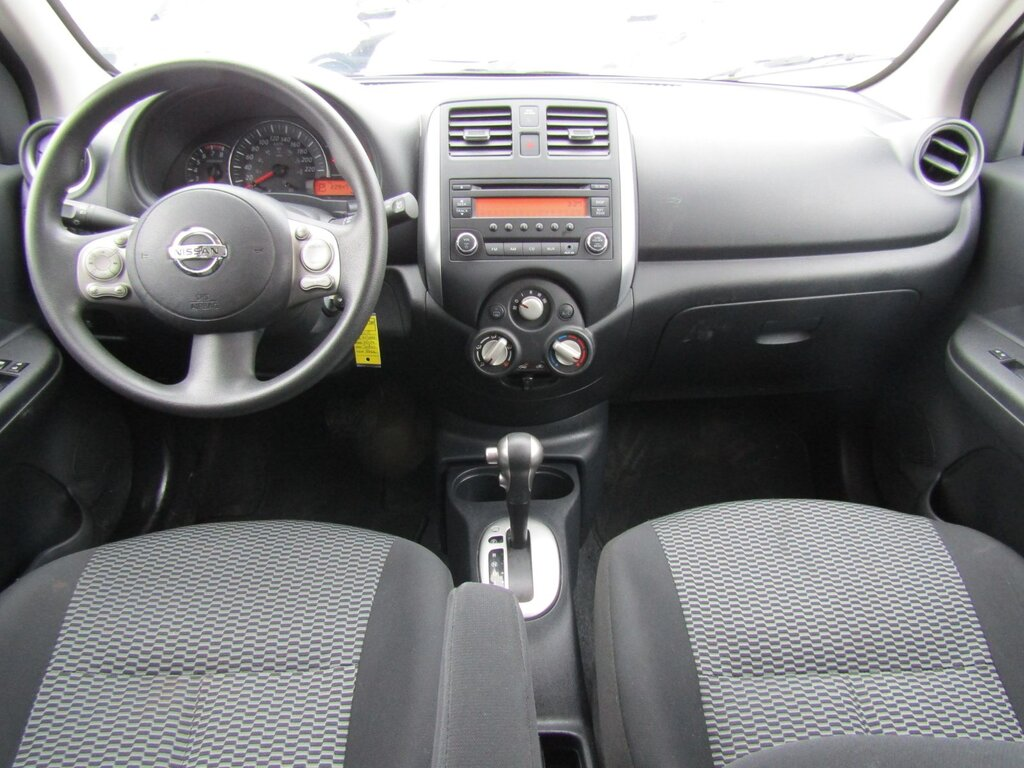
2015 Nissan Micra SV interior (Canada)

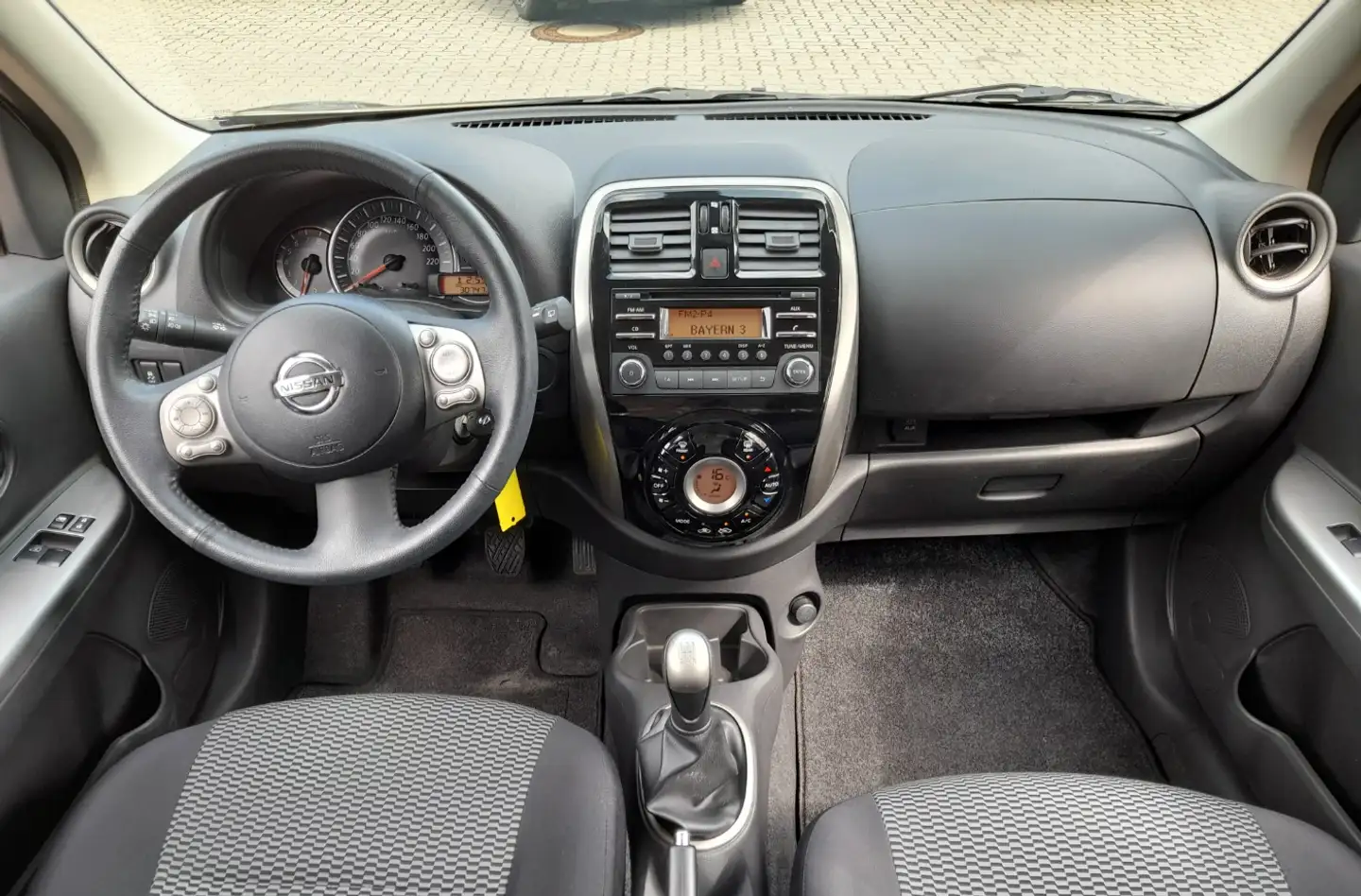
2014 Nissan Micra interior (Europe; global model)

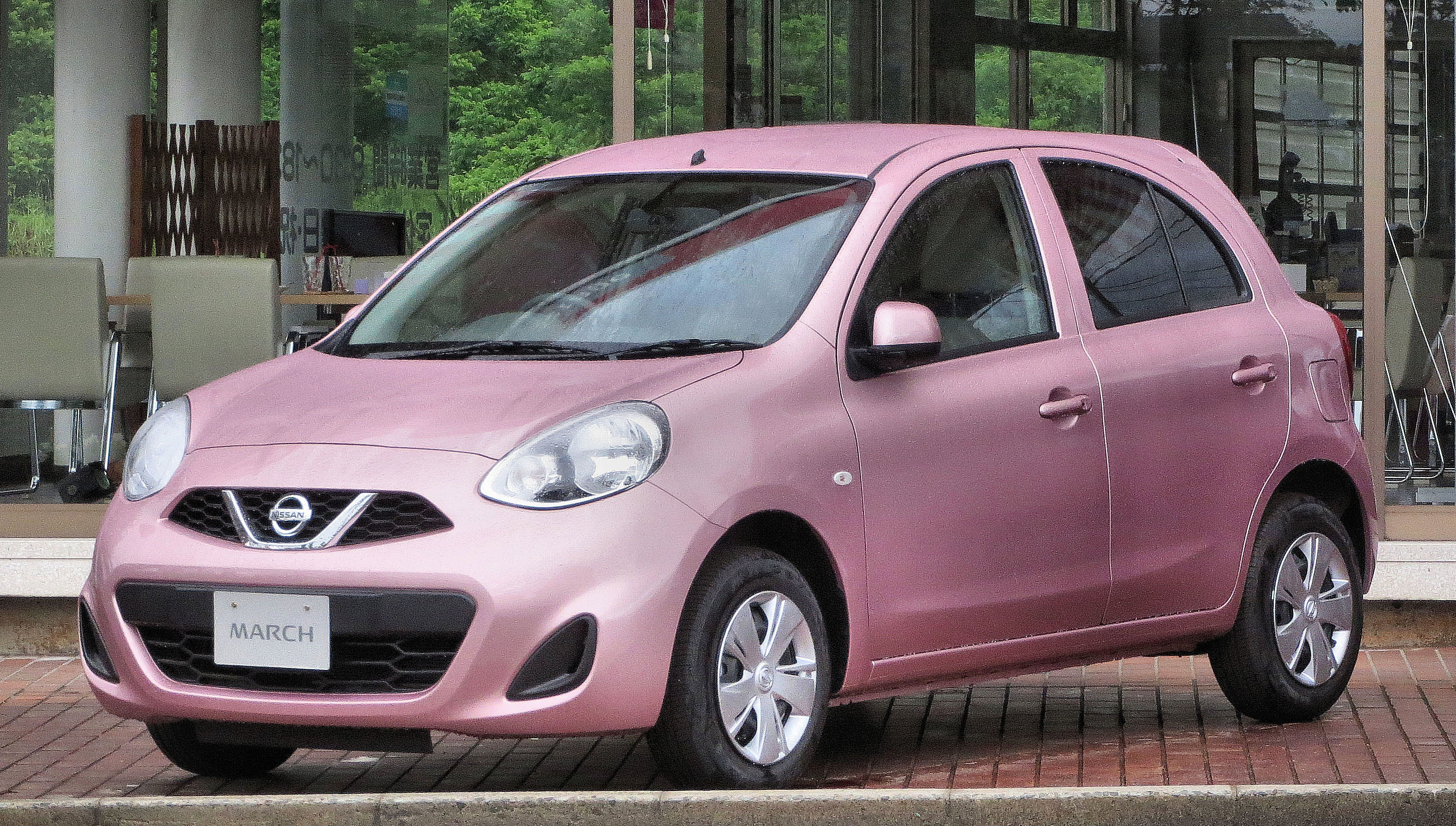
2013 Nissan March 1.2X V Selection (Japan; Asian 2013 facelift)

==== Second facelift ====
For the 2021 model year, the second restyling of the March was introduced in Mexico on 29 January 2021, and other Latin American markets afterwards. Changes include a redesigned front and rear styling, updated LED headlamps and taillamps, updated wheel design, and a revised interior design. For the Mexican market, it received upgraded standard safety features including ABS, EBD, 5 seatbelts, and 6 airbags. It is offered on the Sense, Advance, and Exclusive trim lines.

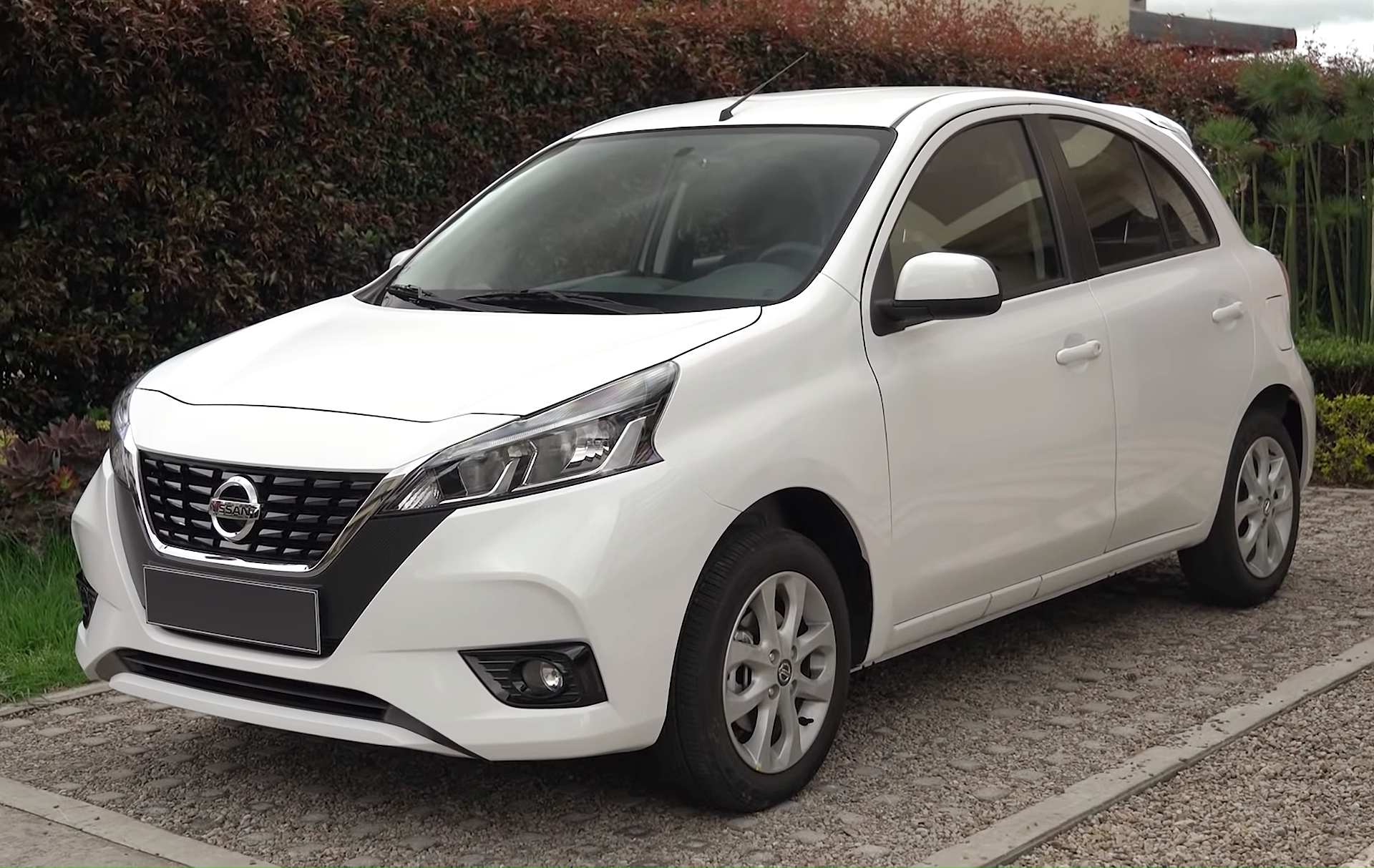
2021 Nissan March Advance (Colombia; Latin American 2021 facelift)

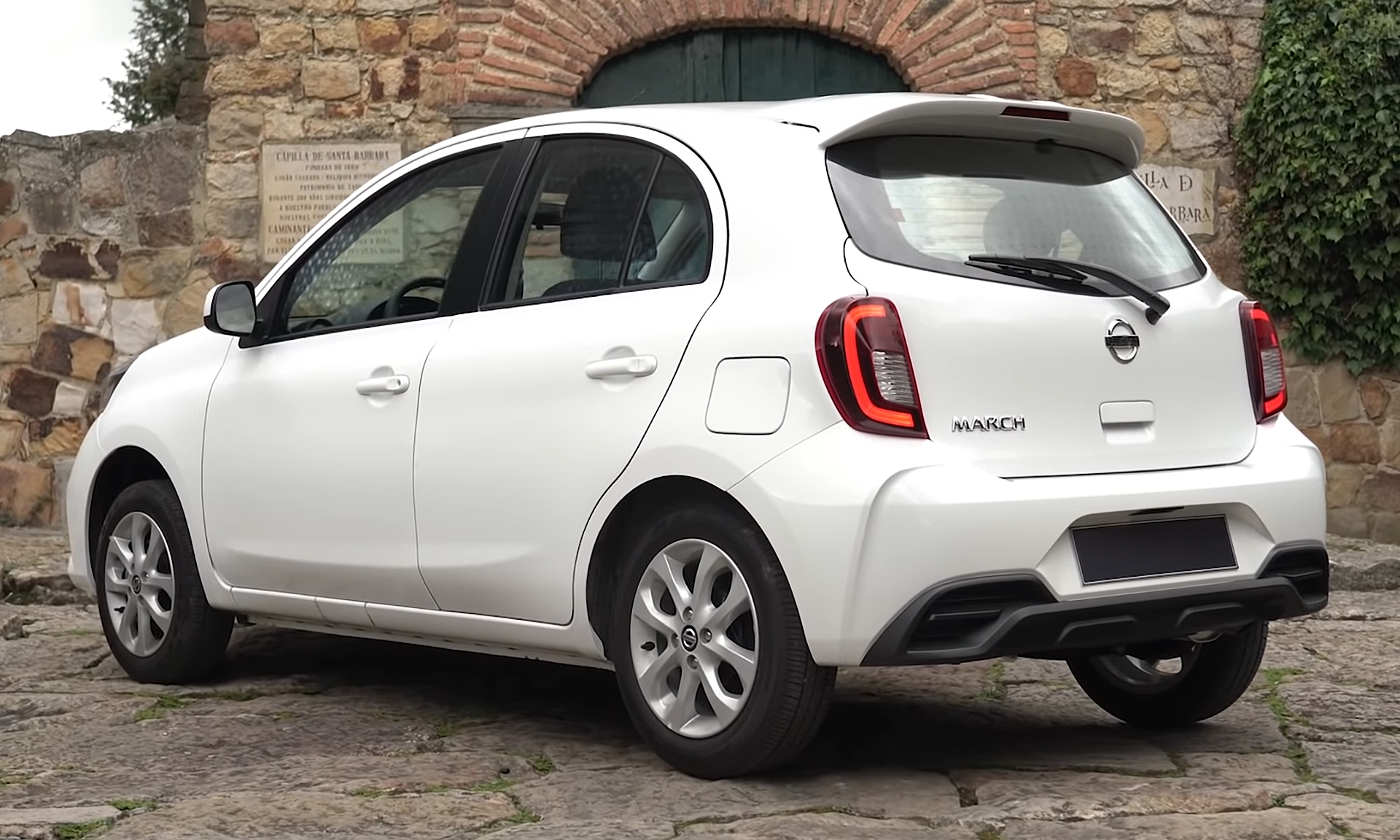
2021 Nissan March Advance (Colombia; Latin American 2021 facelift)

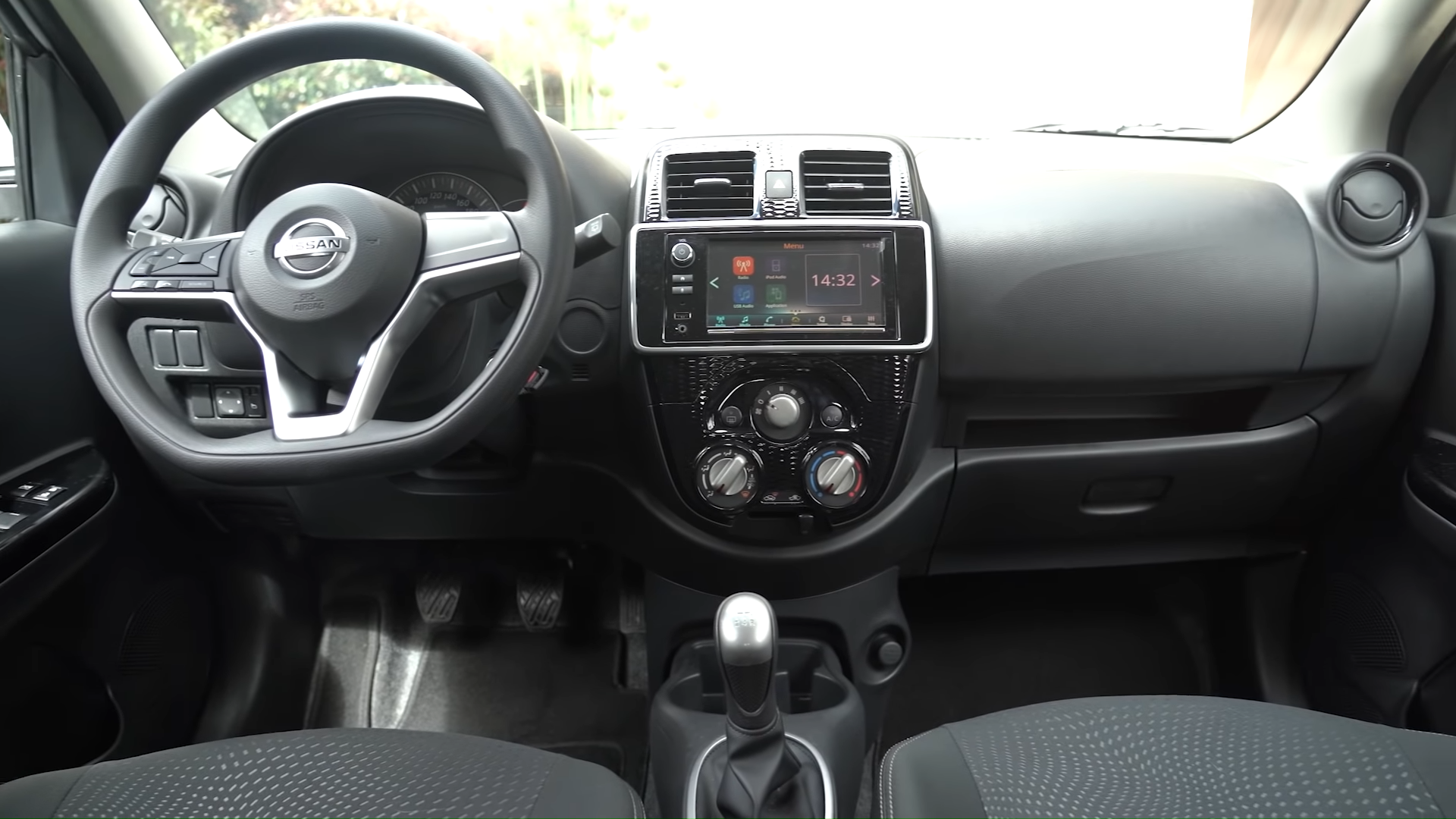
Interior (Latin American 2021 facelift)

=== March Nismo ===
March Nismo went on sale in Japan on sale in December 2013. with the Nismo S unveiled at the 2014 Tokyo Auto Salon.

The March Nismo includes special exterior design features including front and rear bumpers, LED hyper daytime running lights, 16-inch aluminium wheels and includes Vehicle Dynamic Control (VDC), but retains a standard 1.2-litre engine producing 79 bhp (59 kW; 80 PS). The Nismo S version include additional tuning to the HR15DE 1.5-litre engine to produce 114 bhp (85 kW; 116 PS), with a special tuning computer (ECM), exhaust system, customized suspension (stabiliser) brake system and quick steering gear ratio.

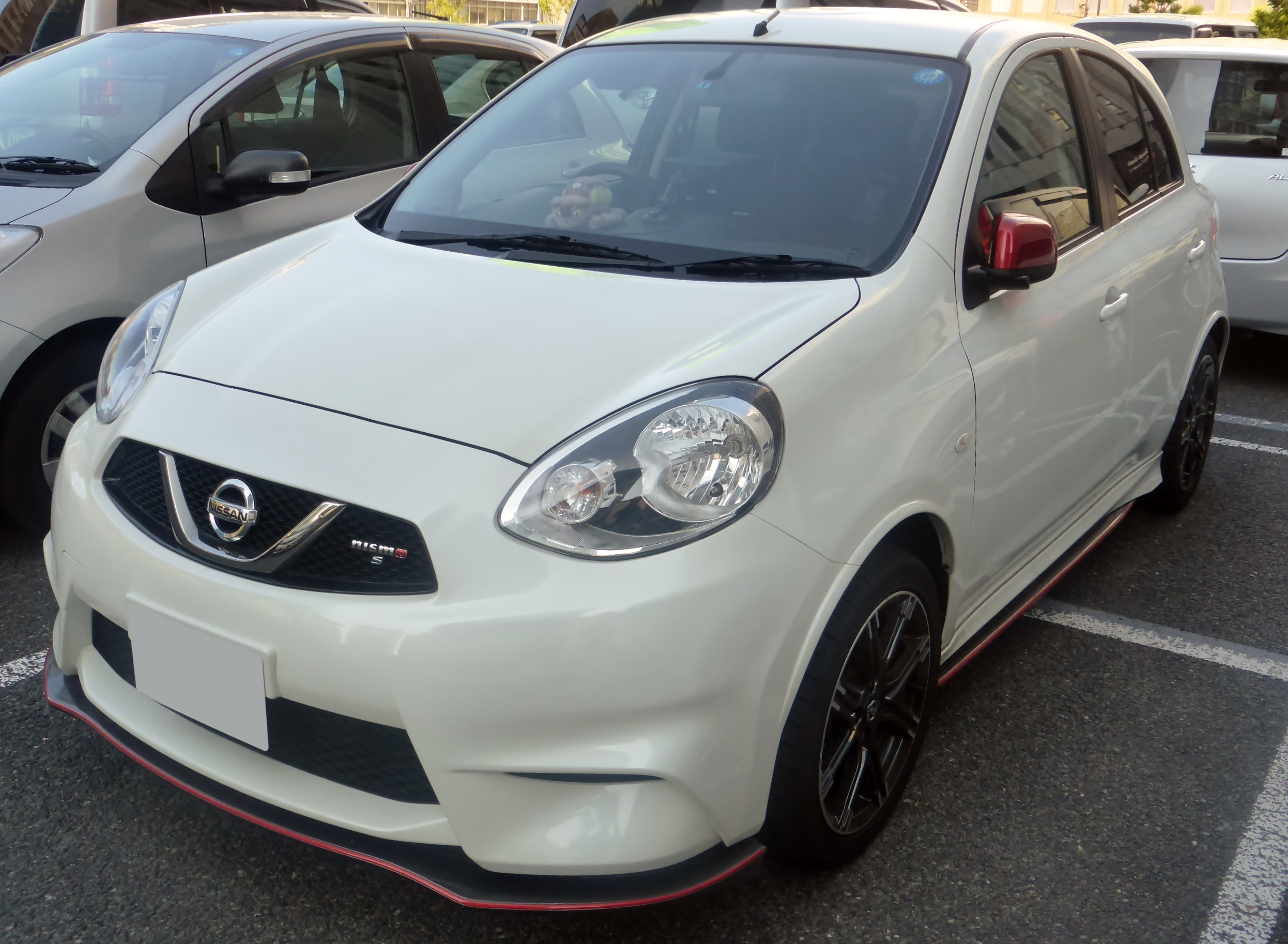
Nissan March Nismo S (Japan)

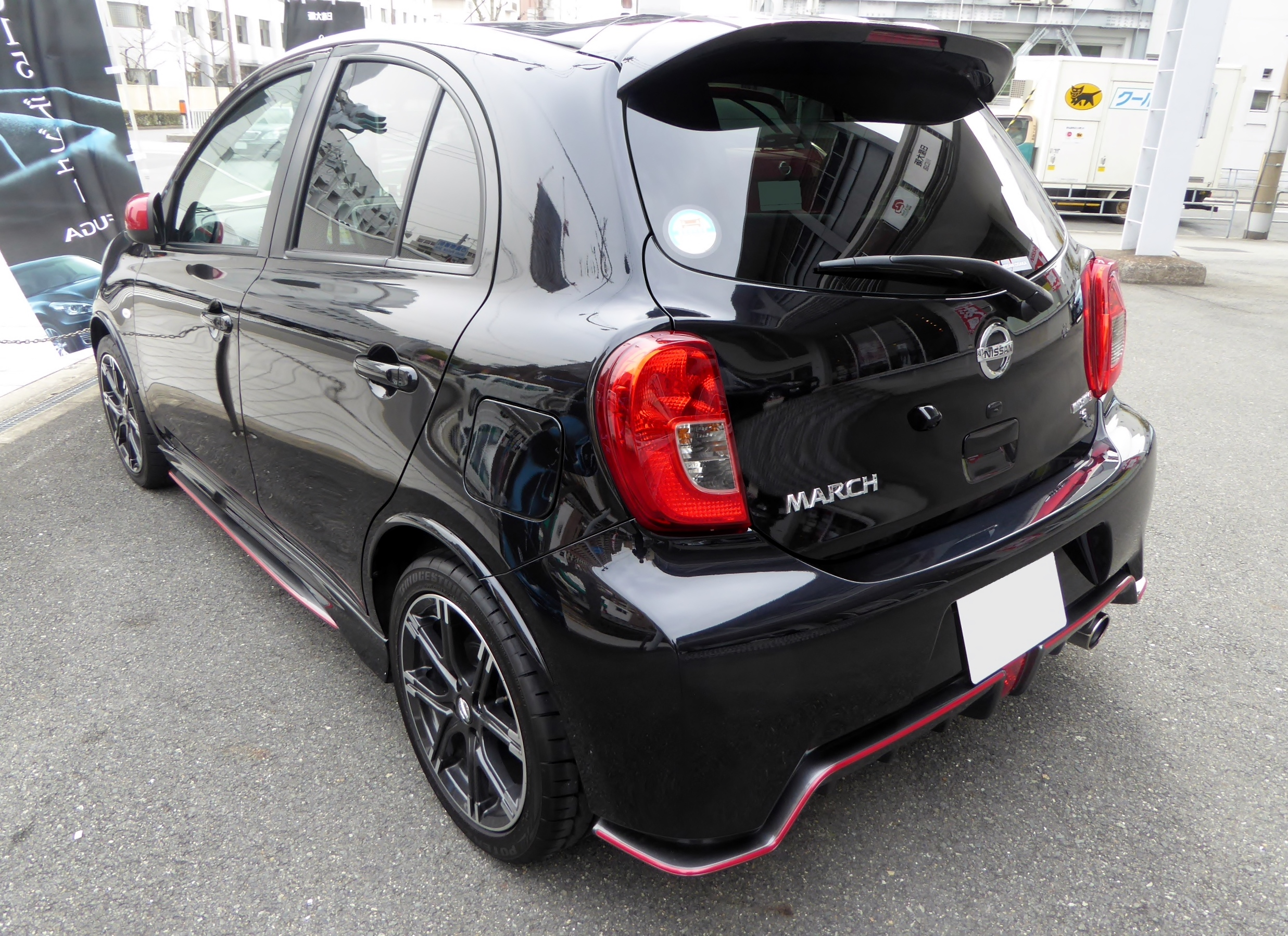
Nissan March Nismo S (Japan)

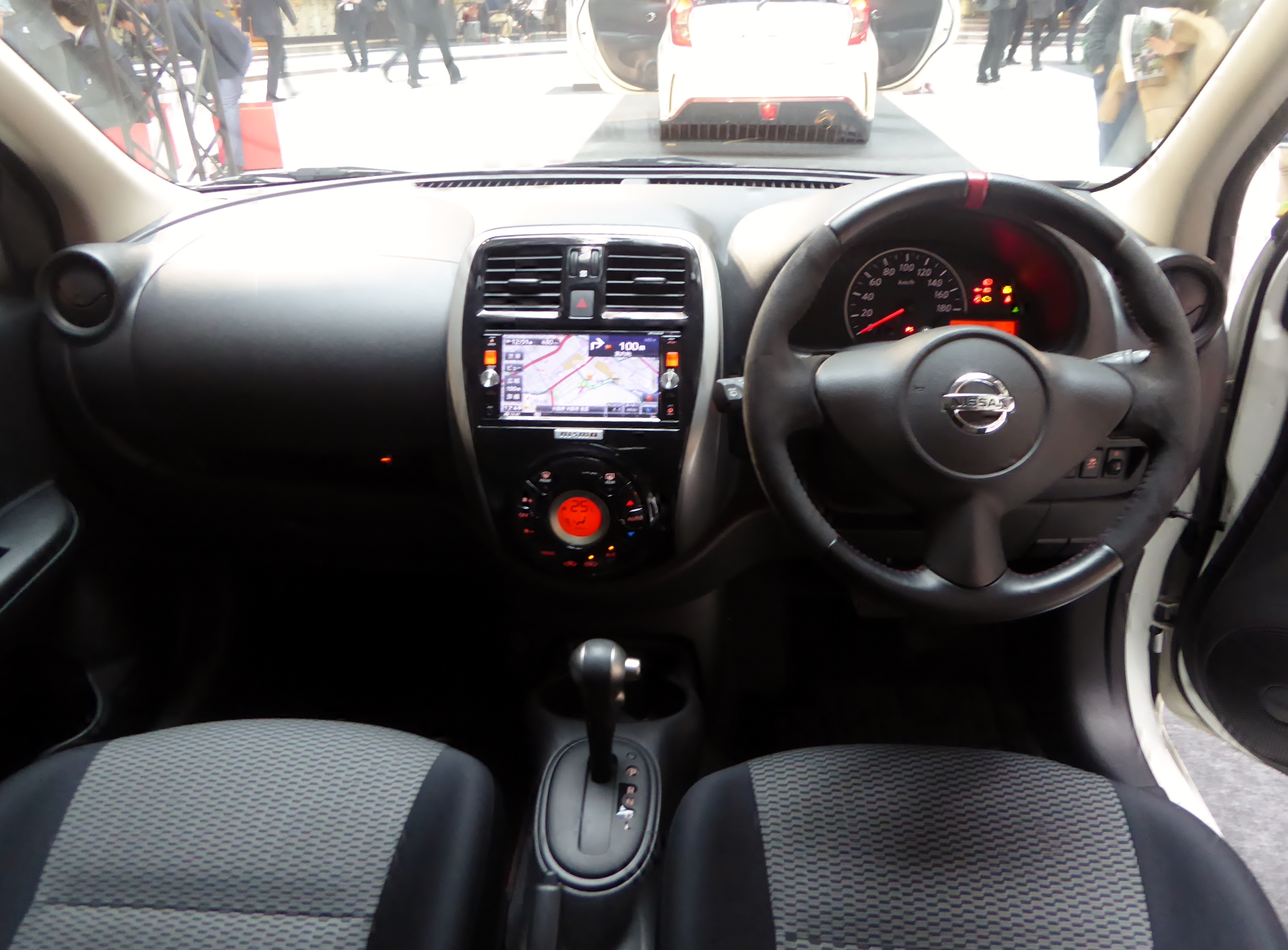
Interior

=== Nissan March Bolero A30 by Autech ===
To commemorate their 30th anniversary in 2016, Nissan's skunkworks division, Autech, built a limited run of 30 Nissan March Autech Bolero models called the "A30." The goal was to create "a wolf in sheep's clothing." Development began in 2014 by Autech Japan's in-house Chigasaki skunkworks club, "Wakuwaku Motors;" a group of volunteer Autech employees who work after hours on special projects.

The project mule, named Bolero R, utilized a larger HR engine from Nissan's Note Rider as a base for testing and developing the production powertrain for the A30. Meanwhile, the gearbox used was the same five-speed close ratio manual found in the then March NISMO. The Bolero R used a variety of bespoke parts (such as the body kit and wheels), off the shelf parts from the Nismo/Autech catalogue, and aftermarket components (such as Öhlins adjustable dampers). The production version, named "Bolero A30," was announced in late 2015 as a limited run model, and closely mirrors the Bolero R, albeit with a few minor changes.

The A30 features houndstooth Recaro LX-F IM110 front cloth seats, a leather steering wheel, bespoke gauges with a higher redline and top speed than the standard March Bolero, and a piano black shift knob. Otherwise, there are no other material differences, regarding the interior, between the A30 and the standard Bolero. As for the exterior, the A30 features 90mm wide fender flares to accommodate 205/45ZR16 Michelin Pilot Sport 3s tires, larger 16' Enkei wheels, different front and rear bumpers, an Autech rear spoiler, and the Bolero grille. All of the 30 examples were painted in the same Night Veil Purple colour.

The A30 features the larger HR16DE engine, however it was assembled by hand at Autech's Chigasaki facility. Notably, the A30 is the only Japanese K13 March to use the HR16DE engine, whereas other markets did receive the HR16DE in the K13 Micra/March. Using the HR16DE engine also deviated from the HR15DE used in the Bolero R test mule. Modifications included upgraded Autech camshafts, valve springs, pistons, connecting rods, and a lighter crankshaft. Along with these upgrades, the head was ported and polished. Without changing the displacement, a re-tune of the ECM, upgrading the intake, and upgrading to a freer flowing twin exit Autech exhaust, the engine now produced 150ps and 160N⋅m, with a redline of 7,100RPM and a top speed of 220 km/h (137 mph). Power is sent to the front wheels via the same 5-speed manual transmission as the March Nismo S, which does not have a limited slip differential.

The curb weight of the A30 is 1030kg, which is 20kg more than the Nismo S. The A30 also received suspension and brake upgrades, with the rear brakes notably changed from drums to discs, which were material differences distinct to the A30 and were not found on any other K13 Micra/March. The A30 also featured an additional rear crossbar, made possible by removing the spare tire well and installing a flattened floor in its place. Upgraded front and rear bracings were also added to the A30.

The original sale price for the A30 was ¥3,564,000. The A30 was only available for purchase through a lottery system held in collaboration with the Chigasaki Chamber of Commerce and Industry. For price comparison, the 2016 Nissan March Nismo S started at ¥1,876,600, and a standard 2016 Nissan March started at ¥1,151,280. Finally, each A30 has an individualized plaque inside the car denoting the cars serial production number.

=== Renault Pulse ===
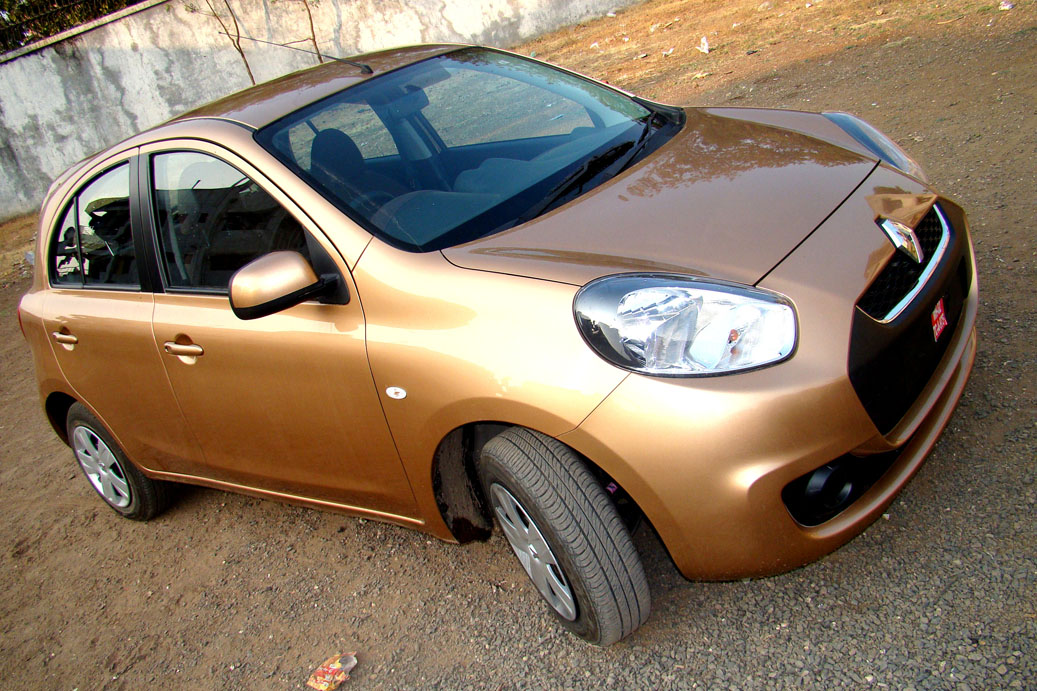
2012 Renault Pulse

The Renault Pulse is a version of the Micra sold by Renault for the Indian market, designed by Renault's Design Center in Mumbai. Changes include a redesigned front end, new headlights and tail lights, and a redesigned rear bumper. RXZ models is equipped with dual airbags, automatic climate control, engine start/stop button, lock/unlock sensing, folding outside rear-view mirrors, etc. It went on sale from January 2012 at the Auto Expo India. Early models include a 1.5 dCi diesel engine. The Pulse was discontinued in 2017 due to poor sales.

=== Engines ===
Engine Type	Code	Power/rpm	Torque/rpm
1.0 L (999 cc; 61 cu in) I4	D4D	75 PS (55 kW; 74 hp) at 5850	98 N⋅m (72 lb⋅ft) at 4350
1.2 L (1,198 cc; 73 cu in) I3	HR12DE	79 PS (58 kW; 78 hp) at 6000	106 N⋅m (78 lb⋅ft) at 4400
1.2 L (1,198 cc; 73 cu in) I3	HR12DE	80 PS (59 kW; 79 hp) at 6000	110 N⋅m (81 lb⋅ft) at 4000
1.2 L (1,198 cc; 73 cu in) supercharged I3	HR12DDR	98 PS (72 kW; 97 hp) at 5600	142 N⋅m (105 lb⋅ft) at 4400
1.5 L (1,498 cc; 91 cu in) I4	HR15DE	99 PS (73 kW; 98 hp) at 6000	137 N⋅m (101 lb⋅ft) at 4800
1.6 L (1,598 cc; 98 cu in) I4	HR16DE	107.5 PS (79 kW; 106 hp) at 5600	142 N⋅m (105 lb⋅ft) at 4000
Canadian spec: 1.6 L (1,598 cc; 98 cu in) I4	HR16DE	109.0 PS (80 kW; 108 hp) at 6000	142 N⋅m (105 lb⋅ft) at 4400

=== Transmission ===
The K13 Micra has a 5-speed manual transmission. The manual transmission uses up to 15% less fuel than Xtronic CVT depending on driving conditions and style of driving. It also has better durability and can support more horsepower and torque. The manual transmission ratio and the maximum speed in each manual transmission gear (in Thailand spec).

=== Safety ===
EuroNCAP tested this model of the Nissan Micra as a standard equipment LHD, 5-door hatchback, registered in 2010. They scored it accordingly:

- Overall
- Adult Occupant 84%, 30 points
- Child Occupant 79%, 39 points
- Pedestrian 58%, 21 points
- Safety Assist 57%, 4 points

The Micra scored well in the test and received 4 stars from a possible 5, although the car was penalised for "loading the dummy in an unrealistic way" and increasing chest damage to the driver and passenger. Despite this, the results were decent for a hatchback and the car offers good protection for side and front end impacts.

== Fifth generation (K14; 2016) ==
Fifth generation
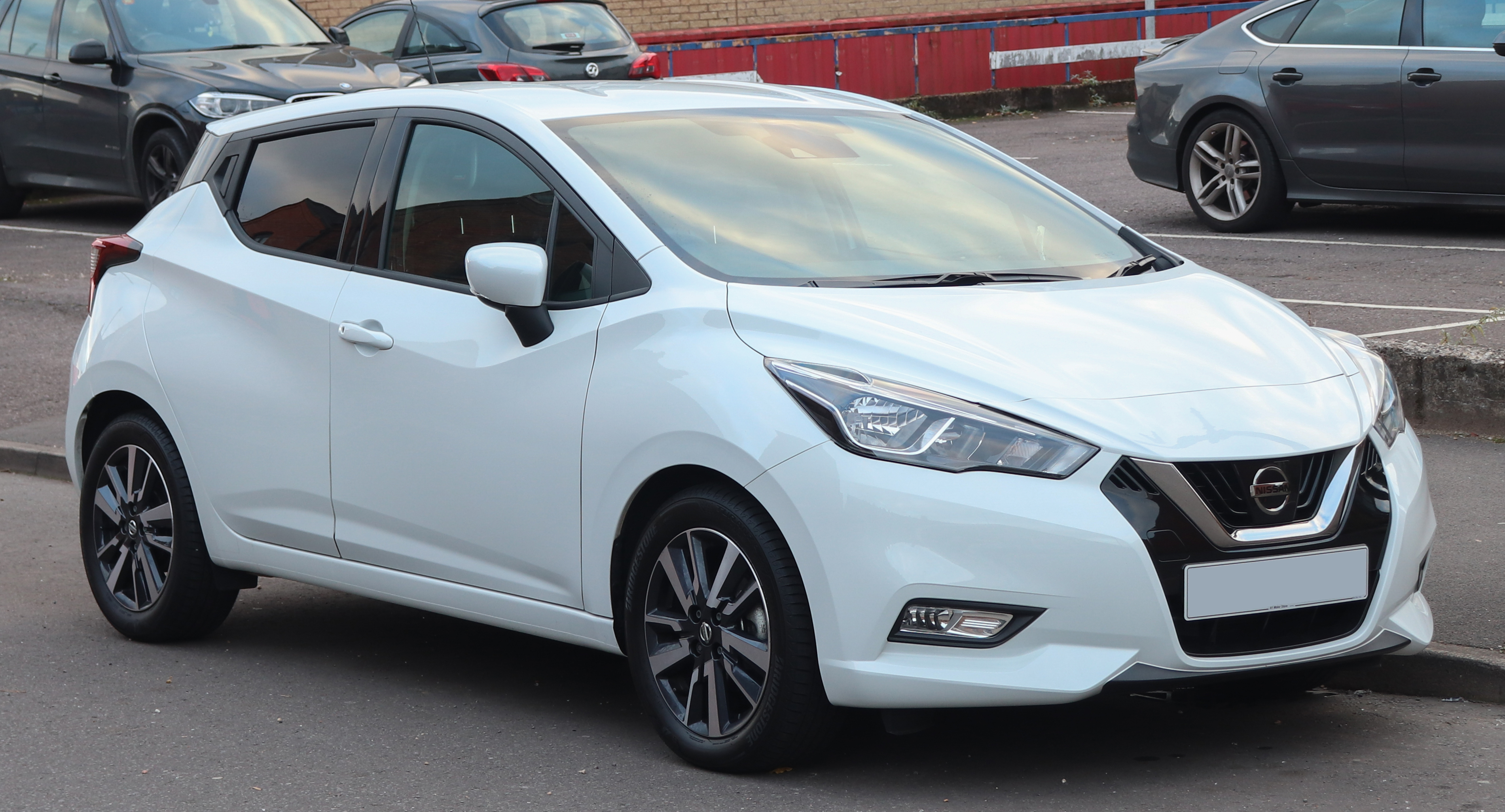
- 2017 Nissan Micra N-Connecta (UK)

Overview
- Model code: K14
- Production: December 2016 – January 2023
- Assembly: France: Flins-sur-Seine (Flins Renault Factory)

Body and chassis
- Body style: 5-door hatchback
- Layout: Front-engine, front-wheel-drive
- Platform: Nissan V platform
- Related: Nissan Almera (N18); Nissan Kicks (P15); Renault Clio IV; Renault Captur I

Powertrain
- Engine: Petrol: 898 cc H4BT turbo I3; 999 cc M281 I3; 999 cc HR10DET/HRA0 turbo I3; Diesel: 1461 cc K9K turbo I4
- Transmission: 5/6-speed manual Xtronic CVT

Dimensions
- Wheelbase: 2,525 mm (99.4 in)
- Length: 3,999 mm (157.4 in)
- Width: 1,743 mm (68.6 in)
- Height: 1,455 mm (57.3 in)
- Kerb weight: 1,052–1,530 kg (2,319–3,373 lb)

Chronology
- Predecessor: Nissan Note (Europe)

The fifth-generation Micra, the K14, was unveiled at the 2016 Paris Motor Show. It has all-new exterior and interior design and shares the same platform as its predecessor.

The fifth-generation Micra is only available in Europe and selected markets such as South Africa, Turkey, Morocco, and New Zealand, while the previous generation remained in production for markets such as Australia, Canada, India, Latin America, Indonesia, and Thailand. Sales in Europe began in March 2017. In South Africa, the fifth-generation Micra is sold alongside the fourth-generation Micra Active and sales began in June 2018. By 2022, the Micra Active was no longer sold in South Africa and only the fifth generation "New" Micra was still available. Plans to sell the Micra in Latin America were scrapped since the model would be too expensive. Similar plans to bring the new fifth-generation Micra into Canada were also scrapped since the model's main selling point was its just over $10,000 price, which the new model could not match.

Its range of engines is shared with the Renault Clio IV. An entry level, 1.0-litre petrol engine that produces 70 hp (52 kW; 71 PS) is the base engine, while it was also offered with a 1.5-litre diesel engine that produces 90 hp (67 kW; 91 PS) and a 0.9 petrol engine that produces 90 hp (67 kW; 91 PS) (95 hp (71 kW; 96 PS) with its overboost function). The K14 Micra comes with a system called trace control, which prevents understeer by softly pinching the brakes.

Currently, there are five core trims available from - Visia, Visia+, Acenta, N-Connecta, N-Sport and Tekna.

Each one has more advanced systems such as hill start assist and reversing camera, premium rims, 4 speaker system and a leather steering wheel.

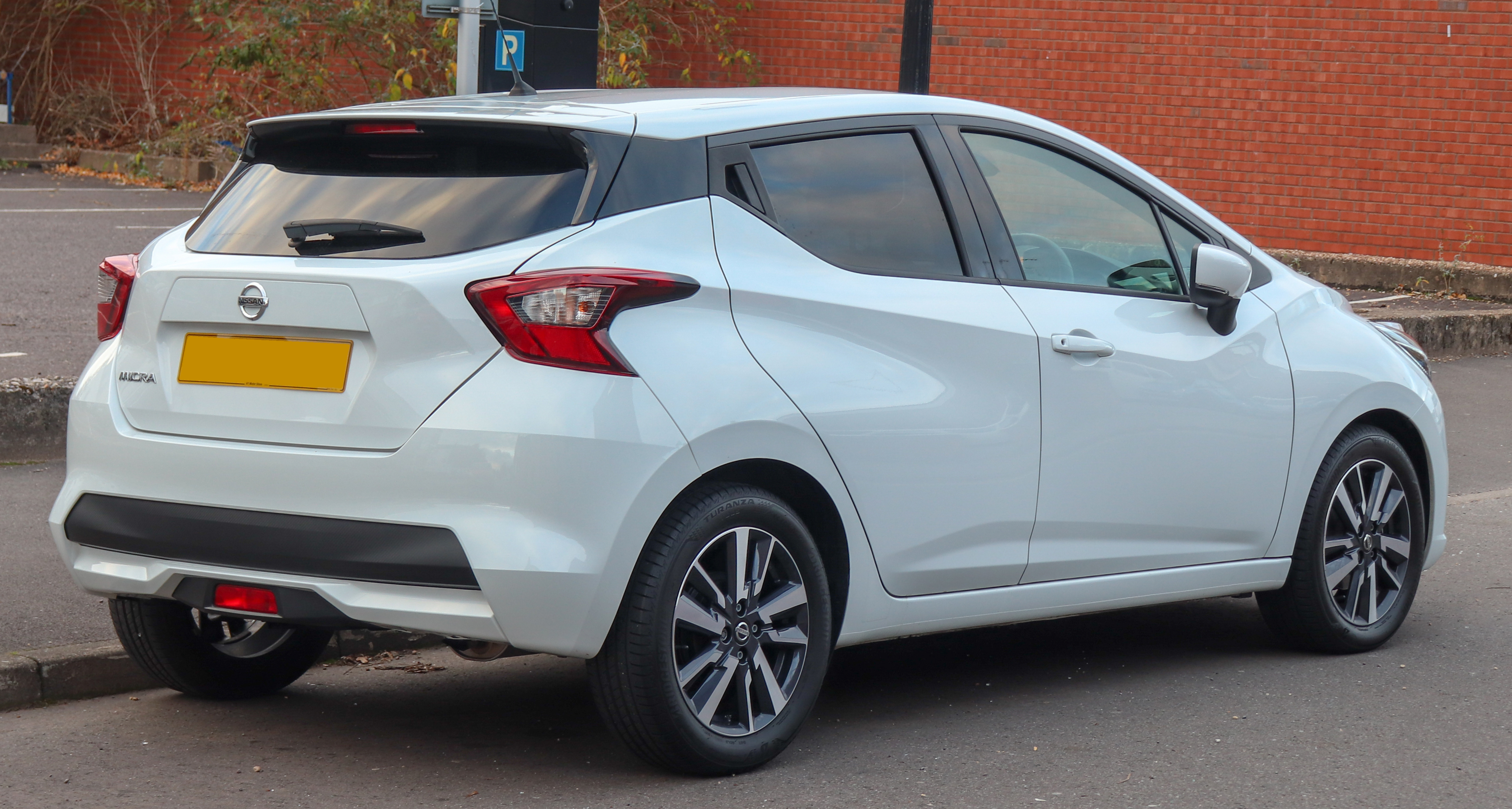
Rear view

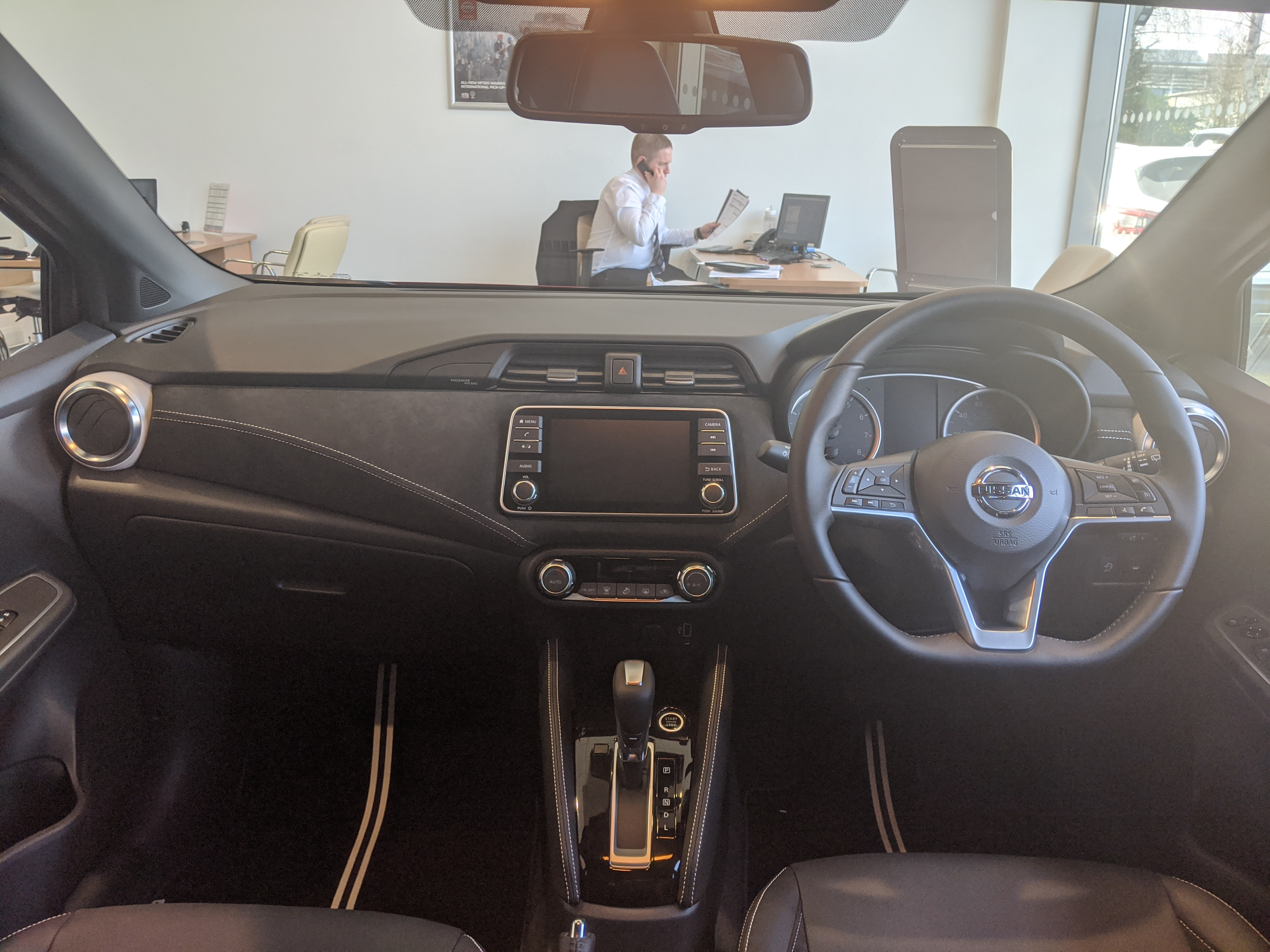
Interior

=== Facelift ===
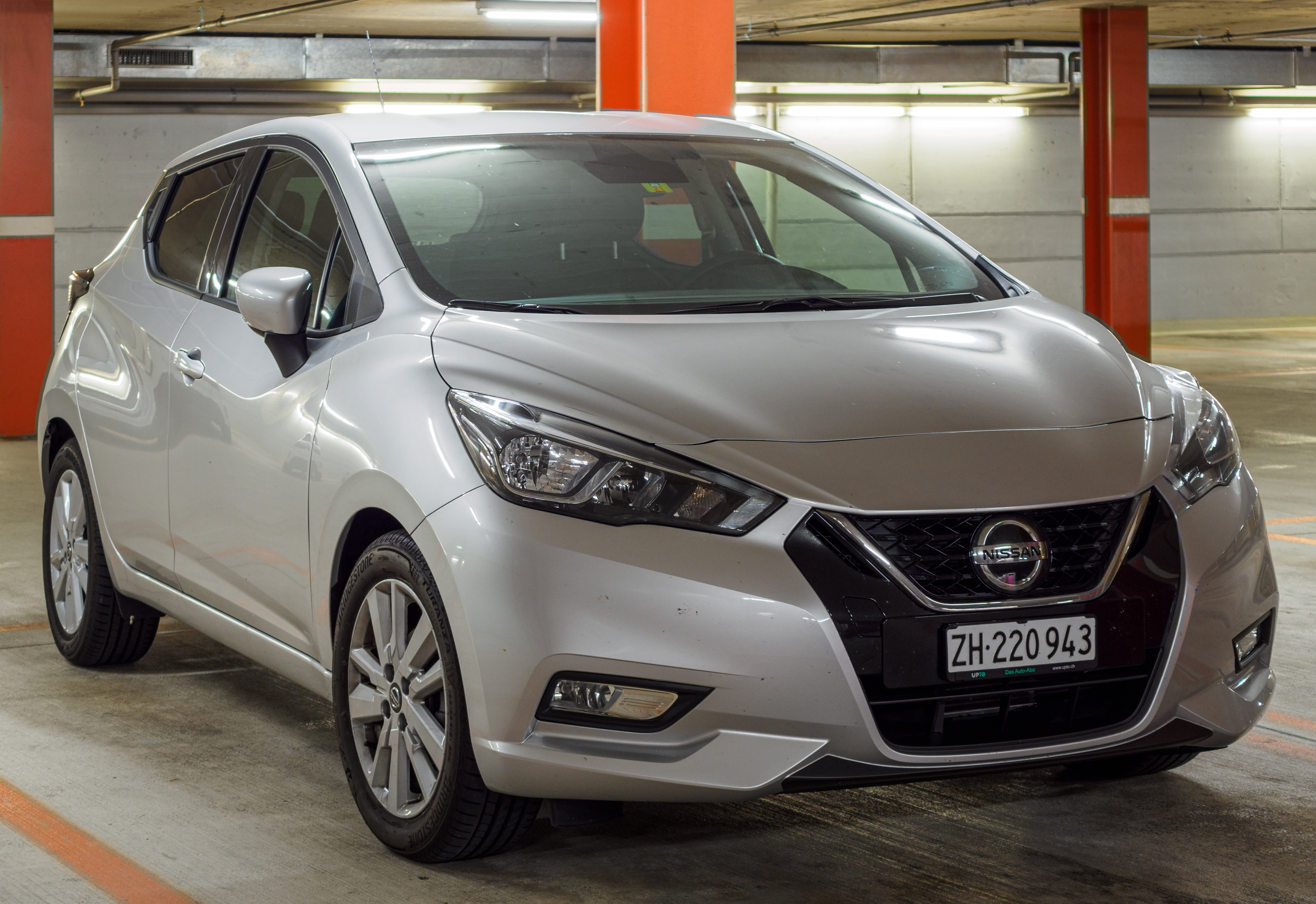
2020 Nissan Micra Acenta

The Micra received an update on 28 January 2019 which introduced a new N-Sport trim. In November 2020, a further minor facelift of the Micra was revealed, showcasing the new N-Design trim. This update included features such as hill start assist, Intelligent Ride Control, and Intelligent Trace Control. Selected versions were also equipped with systems from the Nissan Intelligent Mobility suite, which comprised high beam assist, Intelligent Lane Intervention, traffic sign recognition, and Intelligent Forward Emergency Braking with pedestrian detection. Additionally, two new engines were incorporated into the range: the 999 cc HR10DET/HRA0 turbocharged inline-three and the 1461 cc Renault K9K turbo-diesel inline-four engine.

=== Special Editions ===
==== Kiiro ====
In 2022, Nissan released a special edition of the Micra called "Kiiro" ("Yellow" in Japanese). This version adds lemon yellow elements to the lower area of both bumpers and the side doors, in conjunction with a Gunmetal Grey paintjob, the only colour available, and with the 17-inch wheels which also have a darker tone The Kiiro is based on the Micra Acenta model, fitted with the 999 cc HR10DET/HRA0 turbo i3.

Primarily sold in Portugal and the United Kingdom, the initial plan was to release 100 units, however was later expanded to 200.

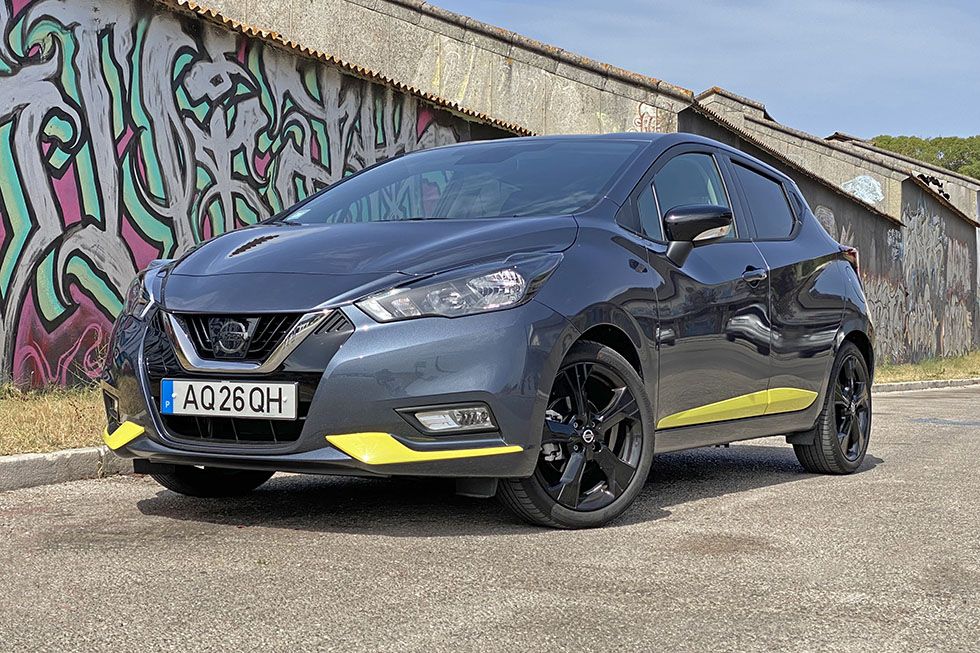
Front featuring the yellow trim and rims

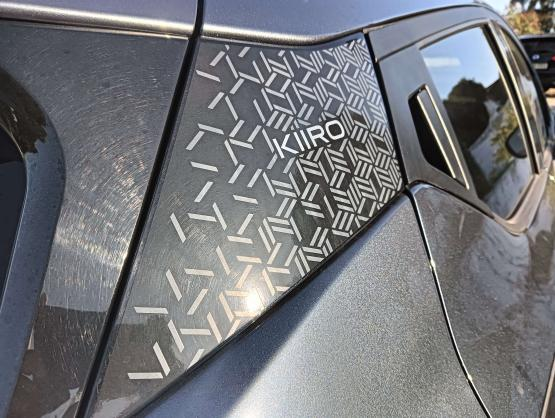
Kiiro lettering

==== Bose ====
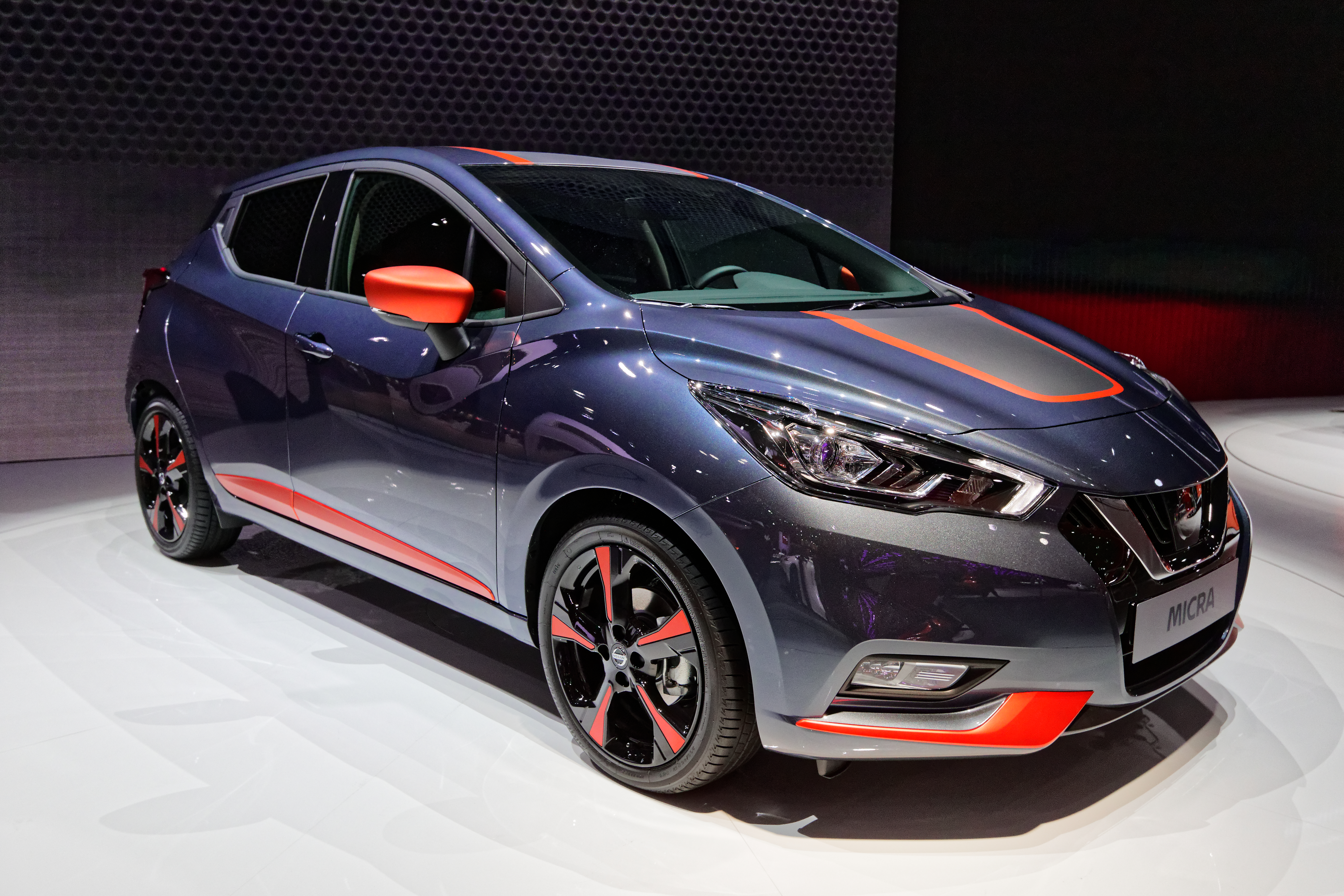
Micra Bose Edition

Nissan also released a special variant called Bose, which added a Bose stereo setup. The stereo includes twin nearfield speakers built into the headrest on the driver's seat and PersonalSpace controls for fine tuning the audio. It uses the same rims as the Kiiro and a special trim. The Micra Bose is available in two colours – "Enigma Black" or "Gunmetal Grey". There were also touches of "Energy Orange", orange accents on the bumper, hood, roof, doors, rear view mirrors and 17-inch wheels.

It is equipped with either the 999 cc M281 straight-three engine or a 1461 cc Renault K9K turbodiesel straight-four engine. 3,000 examples were made available across Europe.

=== Powertrain ===
Petrol Engines
Engine Type	Code	Power/rpm	Torque/rpm
1.0 L (999 cc) i3	M281 E10	52 kW (70 hp) at 6,000 rpm	91 N⋅m (67 lb⋅ft) at 2,850 rpm
0.9 L (898 cc) turbo i3	H4BT	66 kW (89 hp; 90 PS) at 5500 rpm	135 to 140 N⋅m (100 to 103 lbf⋅ft) at 2250–2500 rpm
1.0 L (999 cc) turbo i3	HR10DET/HRA0	74 kW (101 PS; 99 hp) at 5000 rpm	160 N⋅m (118 lbf⋅ft) at 1750 rpm

Diesel Engine
Engine Type	Code	Power
1.5 L (1,461 cc) turbo i4	K9K	90 PS (66 kW)

=== Safety ===
The fifth generation Micra brought more safety features such as side airbags (head and chest) and a more rigid unibody. EuroNcap tested an Acenta Nissan Micra (2017).

- Overall
- Adult Occupant 91%, 34.6 points
- Child Occupant 79%, 39.1 points
- Pedestrian 68%, 28 points
- Safety Assist 49%, 6 points

ANCAP test results Nissan Micra New Zealand variants with a 0.9L engine (2017, aligned with Euro NCAP)
Test	Points	%
Overall:	5 /5 stars	
Adult occupant:	34.6	91%
Child occupant:	39.1	79%
Pedestrian:	33.4	79%
Safety assist:	8.6	72%

== Sixth generation (K15; 2025) ==
Sixth generation
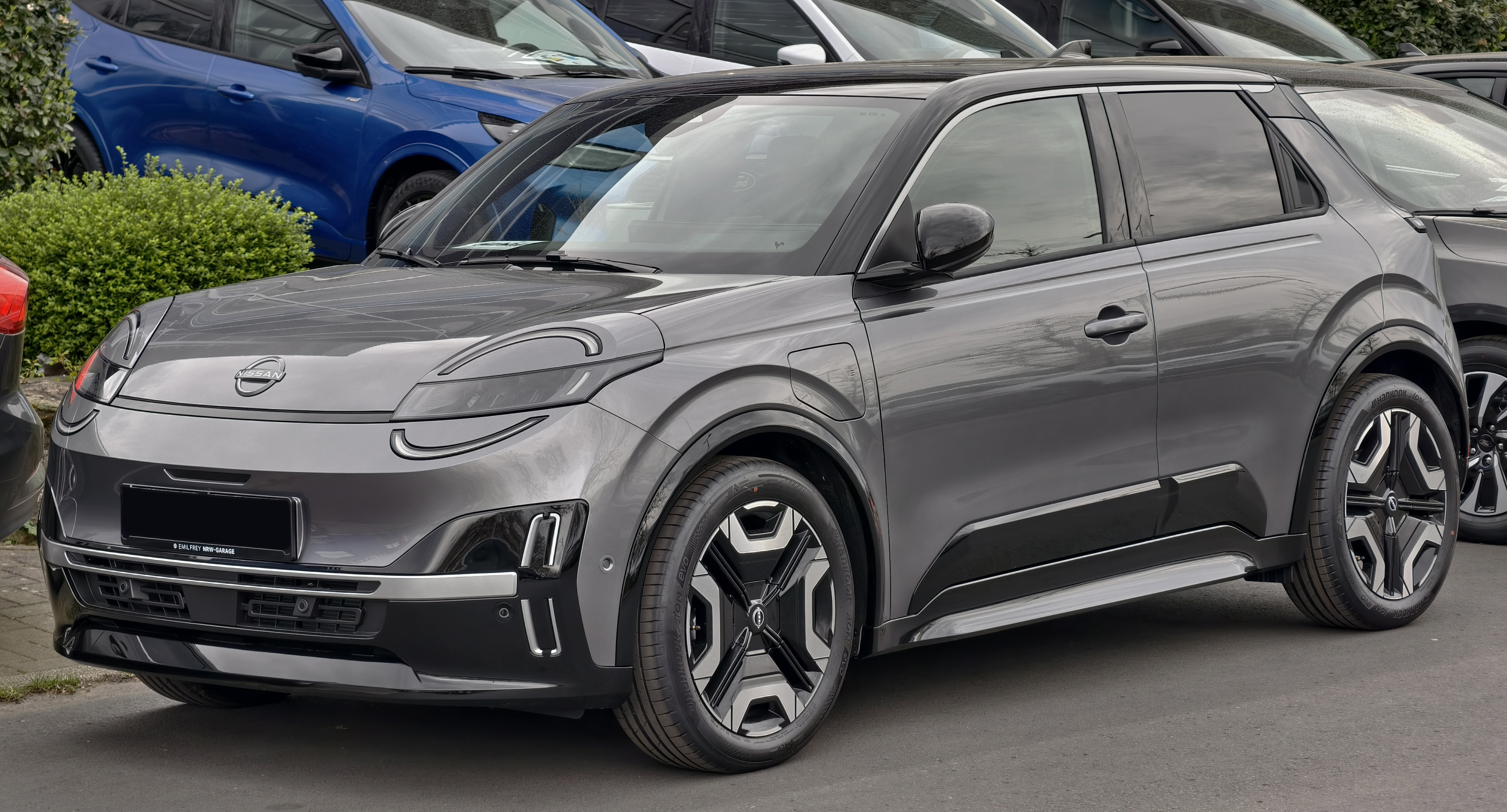
- 2026 Nissan Micra Evolve EV (Europe)

Overview
- Model code: K15
- Production: August 2025 – present
- Assembly: France: Douai (Renault ElectriCity)
- Designer: Matthew Weaver

Body and chassis
- Body style: 5-door hatchback
- Platform: AmpR Small
- Related: Alpine A290; Renault 4 E-Tech; Renault 5 E-Tech; Renault Twingo E-Tech

Powertrain
- Battery: 40 kWh NMC; 52 kWh NMC
- Electric range: 400 km (250 mi) (WLTP)

Dimensions
- Wheelbase: 2,540 mm (100.0 in)
- Length: 3,999 mm (157.4 in)
- Width: 1,750 mm (68.9 in)
- Height: 1,505 mm (59.3 in)

The sixth-generation Micra is a battery electric vehicle based on the AmpR Small platform, shared with the Renault 5 E-Tech and Renault 4 E-Tech. It is assembled at Renault ElectriCity in Douai, northern France. Proposed Euro 7 emissions regulations, which could increase the cost of a conventionally powered supermini by up to €5,000, prompted Nissan to launch the Micra as electric-only.

The Micra EV was teased on 26 March 2025 alongside the third-generation Leaf. It was officially unveiled on 21 May 2025.

It is available with two powertrains: a front-mounted electric motor producing 90 kW (121 bhp) paired with a 40 kWh lithium iron phosphate (LFP) battery, offering 309 km (192 mi) WLTP range; and 110 kW (148 bhp) with a 52 kWh nickel manganese cobalt (NMC) battery, providing up to 408 km (253 mi) WLTP range. The larger battery supports 100 kW DC fast charging (10–80% in 28 minutes). Initial markets are in Europe, with sales starting late 2025 at prices from around £22,995 (UK).

Sales commenced on 1 September 2025.

It is available in three trim levels; Engage, Advance and Evolve.

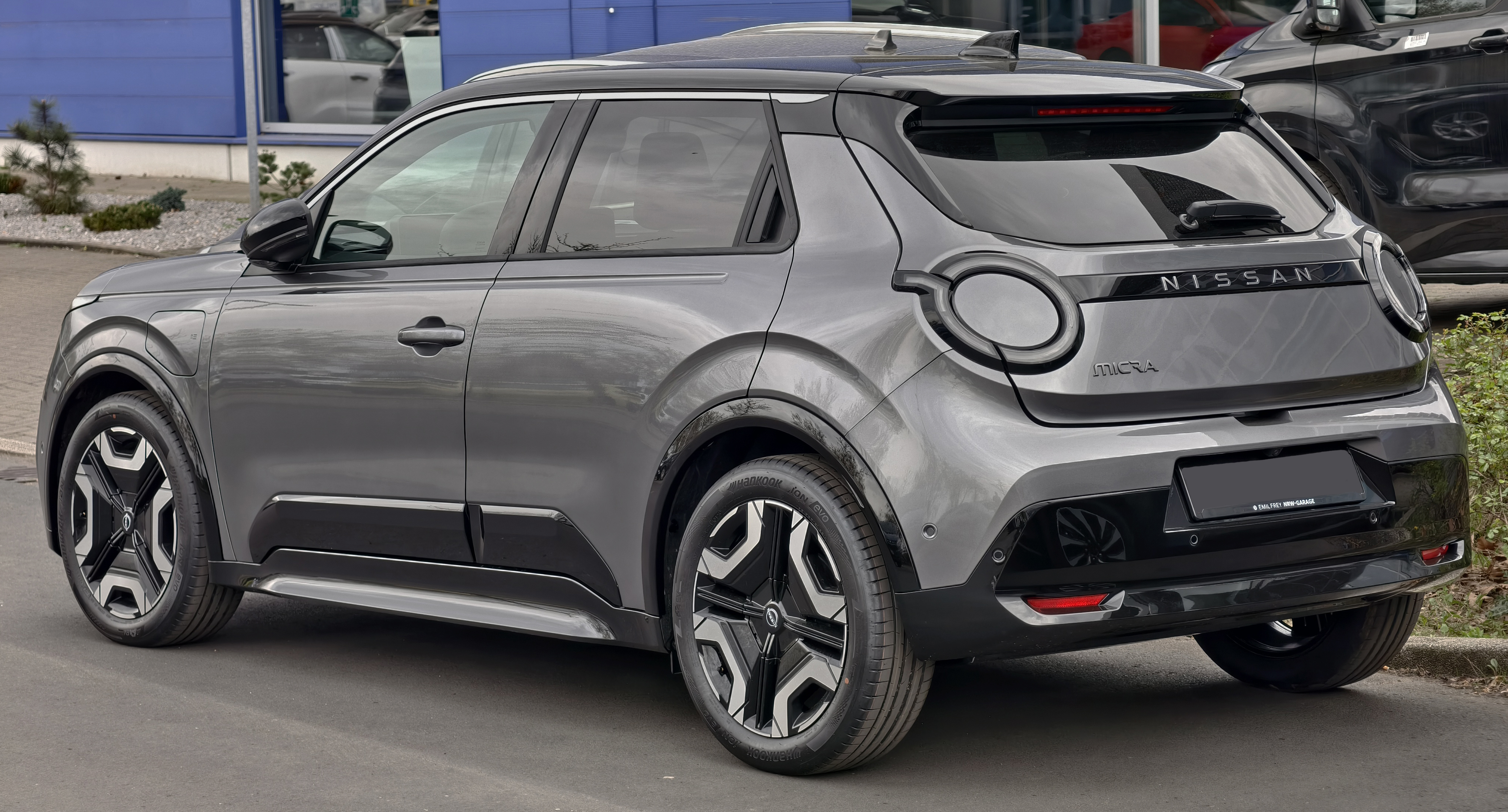
Rear view

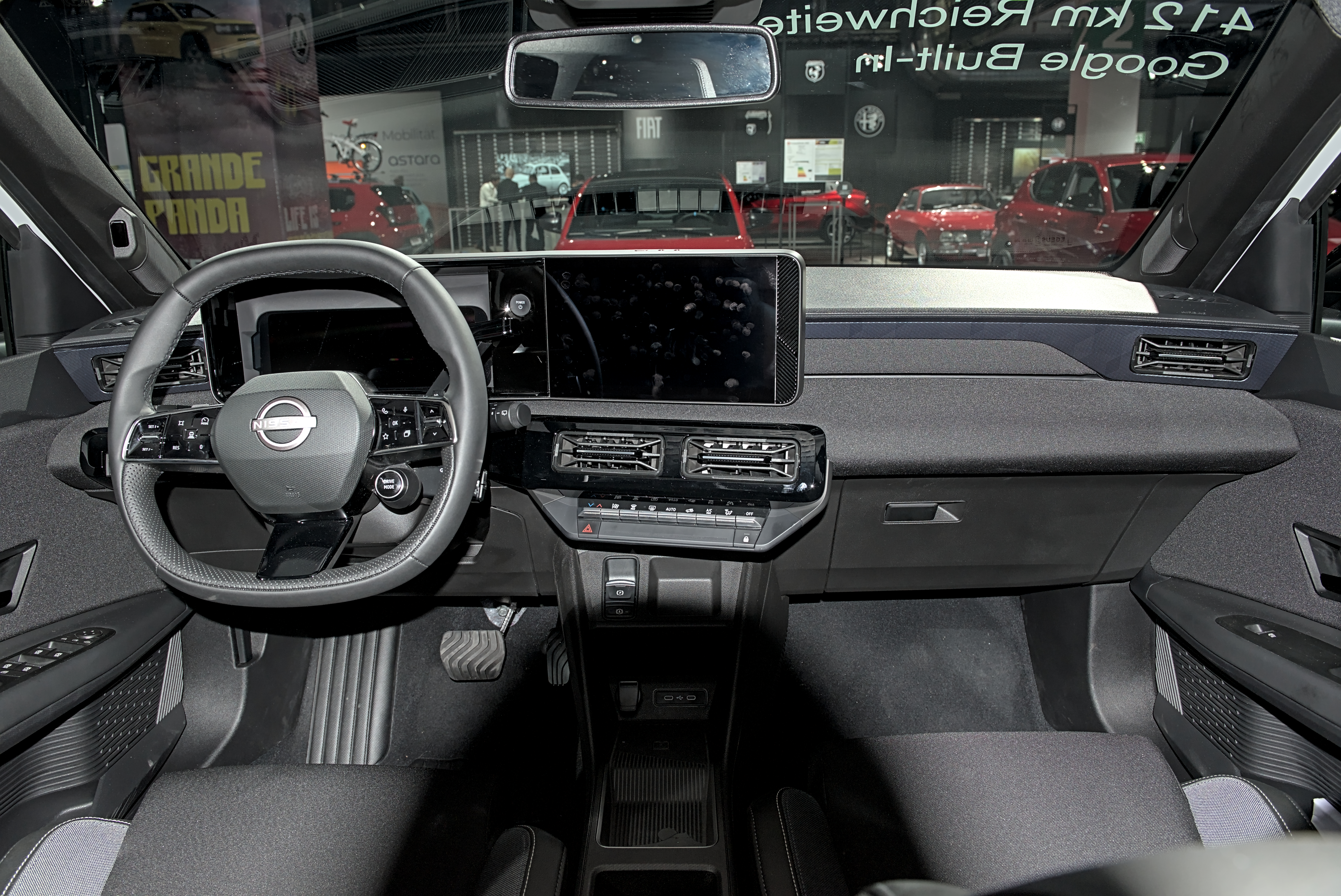
Interior

=== 20-23 concept ===
Nissan released the 20-23 concept in September 2023 to celebrate the 20th anniversary of Nissan Design Europe, its local design office in Paddington, London. It is a battery-electric supermini with styling influenced by the Micra EV previews and JDM cars including the Nissan Pao, Figaro, and S-Cargo. The NDE design team, led by Matthew Weaver, was provided a brief to create a car they would like to drive "on the streets of the city where they work".

== Marketing by country ==
=== Australia ===
The UK-built Micra K11 was briefly exported to the Australian market beginning in 1995 with a three model line up, base 3-door LX, 5-door SLX and 3-door Super S (of which only 303 were ever sold in Australia and demand a hefty price premium over the other models). Class leading performance, a surprisingly dynamic chassis with well sorted suspension, roomy interior and above average build quality were the Micra's strengths in comparison to its Korean competitors like the Hyundai Excel, Daewoo Cielo and Ford Festiva. A poor exchange rate between the UK and Australia meant the Micra's pricing was rather steep and Australian buyers saw the cheaper Koreans and more established Japanese-sourced superminis, such as the Suzuki Swift and Daihatsu Charade, as offering better value for money. Also, the Micra received the lowest possible rating (one star) in Australian crash tests. The Micra was dropped from Nissan Australia's line-up in 1997.

Nissan reintroduced the Micra to Australia in 2007, being sold only as a 5-door hatchback, and coming from Japan and not the UK. The fourth generation Micra was introduced to Australia in October 2010 and imported from Thailand. Nissan dropped the Micra from the Australian market on 29 April 2016.

=== Canada ===
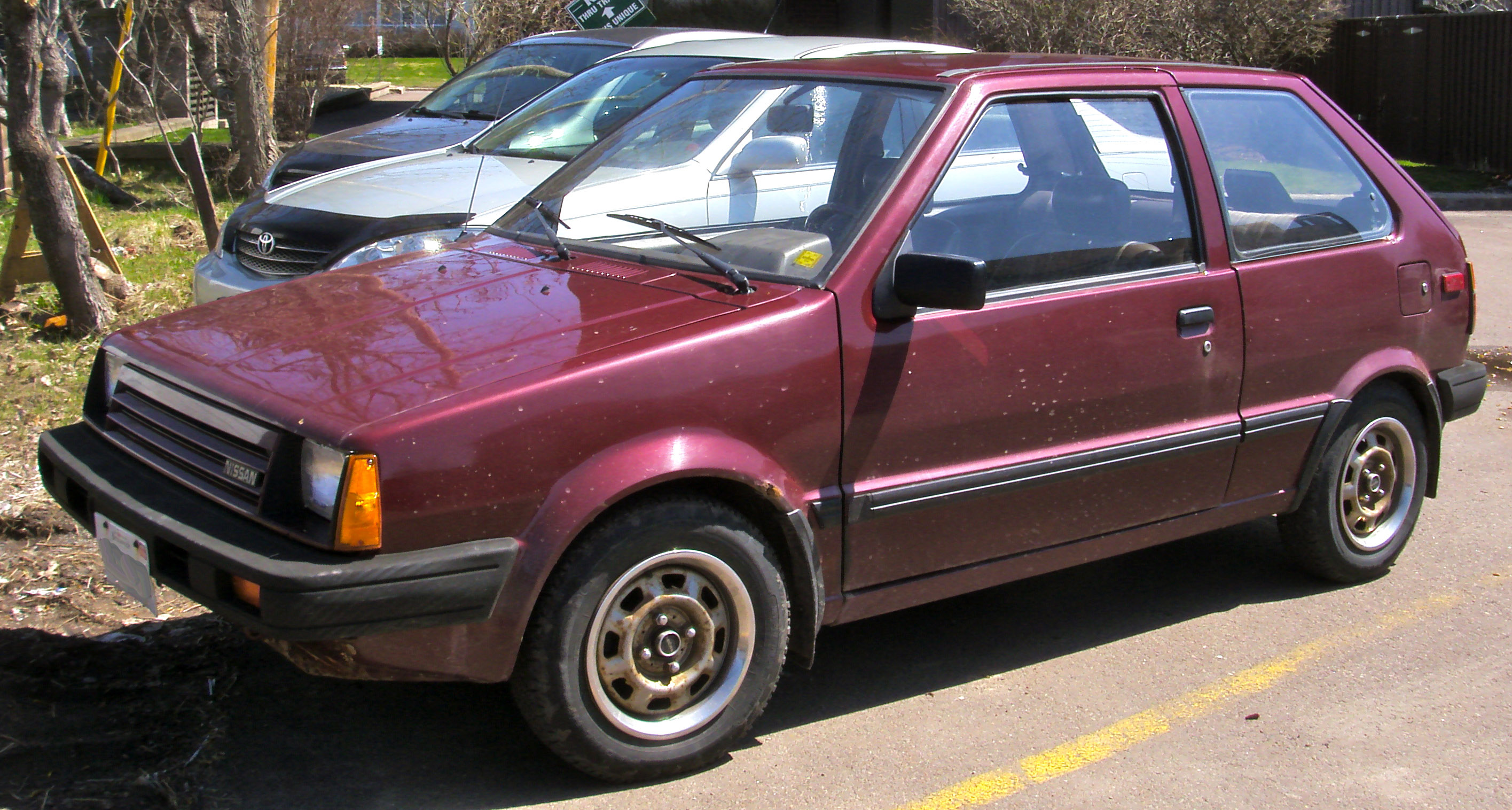
Canadian version of the Micra K10

In Canada, the K10-J was sold and branded as the Nissan Micra. It came standard with the larger MA12S inline 4-cylinder OHC 1.2 L (1235 cc) engine. The Nissan Micra was finally discontinued in Canada in 1991, replaced by the Nissan Sentra Classic.

In 2007, Nissan introduced the substantially larger Versa to the Canadian line up as the new entry-level model.

On 9 January 2014, Nissan Canada Inc. announced the return of the Micra back to the Canadian market after 21 years of absence. Sales started in spring 2014 as a 2015-year model, taking the place of the slow-selling Versa sedan.

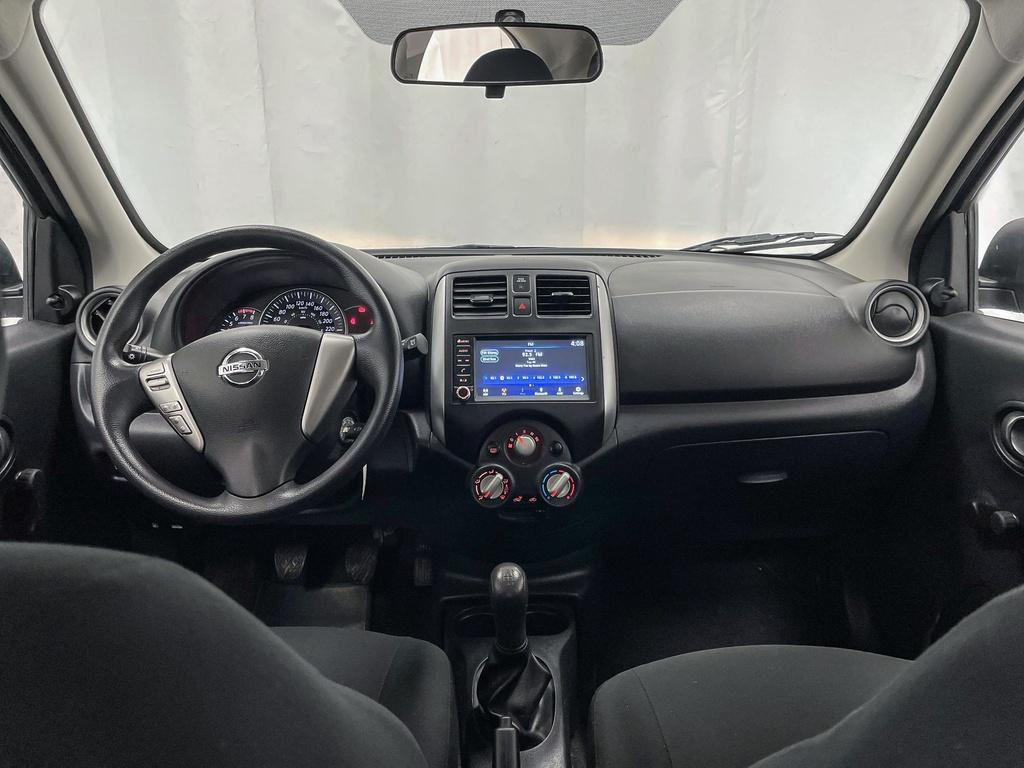
2019 Nissan Micra S interior (Canada; equipped with a mandatory backup camera and car stereo)

The company revealed the car's starting price of C$9,998 for the base, 5-speed manual transmission model at the 2014 Canadian International Auto Show in February. The price made it the least expensive new car in the country by a significant margin.

The available three trim levels are: S, SV, and SR.

The base S trim in its most basic configuration comes standard with a 5-speed manual transmission, along with plastic door handles, manual door locks, manual windows, and manual black mirrors, but lacks both air conditioning and cruise control. Furthermore, it includes 15-inch steel wheels with hubcap covers, intermittent rear wipers, large cupholders, 60/40 split folding rear seats, floor mats, and a two-speaker AM/FM/CD player with an aux-in jack as standard equipment. An optional 4-speed automatic transmission for the S trim adds air conditioning, cruise control with steering wheel controls, a USB port, as well as silver accents on the shift knob and steering wheel.

The SV is the mid-trim variant, which adds body-coloured door handles and mirrors, 2 extra rear speakers, a Bluetooth Hands-free phone system, a rearview monitor, power heated mirrors, air conditioning, and cruise control, power door locks with keyless entry, power windows, an armrest, a height-adjustable driver's seat, a passenger grip handle, chromed interior door handles, and an upgraded sporty trim cloth. The SV style package adds 15-inch aluminum alloy wheels and a body-coloured rear spoiler with LED centre high-mounted stop light.

The SR model, being the higher-end trim, adds a rear spoiler and side skirts, giving it a more sporty appearance, as well as the addition of fog lights, a glossy centre console dash, a 4.3-inch (109 mm) colour display audio system with a reverse camera and a USB port, a leather-wrapped steering wheel and shift knob, a chrome exhaust finisher, and 16-inch aluminum black-painted alloy wheels.

All trim levels of the Canadian-spec Micra come standard with a 5-speed manual transmission as well as front-wheel drive and a DOHC 1.6-litre four-cylinder engine rated at 109 horsepower at 6,000 rpm and 107 lb-ft of torque at 4,400 rpm.

During the final model year, all 2019 Nissan Micra trim models were equipped with a backup camera due to the new regulation law in Transport Canada mandating all new vehicles to be equipped with a backup camera, which took effect starting in mid-2018.

The Micra was once again discontinued after the 2019 model year, due to the new generation Micra being "not budget-friendly". It was instead replaced yet again with the newer third-generation Versa.

=== China ===
In China, Dongfeng Nissan released the Micra K13 on 30 August 2010. Four trims with 1.5-litre engines (HR15DE) are available, priced between 69,900 and 92,900 yuan. It has since been discontinued.

=== India ===
One of the four factories which produce the Nissan Micra K13 is located in India.

Nissan Micra is available in India with four petrol and two diesel variants. The four petrol variants of Nissan Micra are: Nissan Micra XE, Nissan Micra XE Plus, Nissan Micra XL and Nissan Micra XV. All the four variants are powered by the 1.2 L, 1198 cc, petrol engine with five-speed manual transmission that delivers 76 PS (56 kW; 75 hp) at 6000 rpm with 104 N⋅m (77 lb⋅ft) of torque at 4000 rpm. These variants differ from each other by the interior comfort, luxury and safety features. A notable feature includes a standard air bag across the range although ABS is available only on the top variant.

The diesel variants of Nissan Micra are Nissan Micra Diesel XV and Nissan Micra Diesel XV Premium. The Nissan Micra diesel is loaded with a 1.5-litre, 4-cylinder, 8-valve, SOHC, 1461 cc, common rail powertrain that is capable of developing maximum power of 64 PS (47 kW; 63 hp) at 4000 rpm and 160 N⋅m (118 lb⋅ft) of highest torque at 2000 rpm with the same 5-speed.

A rebranded variant of Micra named "Pulse" is sold by Renault in India. It has the same interiors as the Micra though the styling on the exterior is slightly modified. Having the same specifications, features and engines as the Micra, it is similarly priced.

In India, the Micra was offered with a diesel unit: the 65 hp (48 kW) 1.5 dCI K9K produced by Renault. It was discontinued on 11 May 2020, alongside the Sunny saloon, due to both cars not being compliant with India's Bharat Stage VI emissions standards, leaving Nissan with the locally built Kicks and Magnite crossover SUVs and the GT-R as the only cars offered by Nissan for the Indian market.

=== Mexico ===
One of the four factories which produce the Nissan Micra K13 is located in Mexico.

The Nissan Micra K13 is called the Nissan March in Mexico and went on sale in late March 2011, it began production at the Aguascalientes plant in early March.

The Nissan March is sold in 4 trim levels: Drive, Sense, Advance and SR.

The base Drive trim level does not have air conditioning and rear window wipers and has black mirrors; this trim level also lacks a radio and comes with 14-inch steel wheels with wheel covers.

The Sense trim level adds air conditioning, MP3 radio player, colour-coded mirrors and a rear window wiper. This model also comes with 14-inch steel wheels with wheel covers.

The Advance trim level adds 15-inch alloy wheels an optional 4-speed automatic transmission and also adds 2 front airbags for the driver and passenger.

The SR trim adds side skirts and a rear spoiler for a more sporty appearance and has the same alloy wheels only with a darker colour.

All trim levels come standard with a 5-speed manual transmission and with the 1.6-litre engine with 106 hp (79 kW; 107 PS).

It replaced the Nissan Platina in its assembly plant and lineup, plus the previous-generation Micra was sold in Mexico using the Micra name. Even though the March was meant to replace the Platina sedan, the Juke (using the same Micra platform) took the Micra's Mexican place after the 2011 model year.

=== Taiwan ===
In Taiwan, the K11 March was sold from 1993 to 2007. It was sold in three generations. The last generation was a facelifted and improved version called the Super March. It had a digital instrument cluster, LED rear light clusters, side mirror indicators, and an updated front end with crystal headlights. It also came with a semi leather interior with rear headrests. Another more upscale K11 variant, known as the Nissan Verita, was produced. This featured retro styling inside and out. Notable differences included rounded headlights and taillights, a distinctive front end, along with a chrome and faux wood trimmed interior. All Taiwan K11s came with the CG13DE engine. There was also a three-box sedan called the "March Cubic" designed exclusively for the Taiwanese market by Nissan Yulon; its taillights, trunklid, and rear bumpers were different from those used in Japanese market versions.

At the end of 2011, the Nissan March returned to the Taiwanese market as the K13. The HR15DE is currently the only engine available. A 4-speed automatic is the only transmission option as well. The K13 March was discontinued in 2019.

=== Thailand ===
One of the four factories which produce the Nissan Micra K13 was located in Thailand.

In Thailand, the Micra K13 was launched, as Nissan March, at the Bangkok International Motor Show on 26 March 2010, priced from 375,000 baht ($11,600) to 537,000 baht. By early July 2010, the company has received about 8,000 sales order and said new buyers would have to wait for five months. The company expects to produce 90,000 units in 2010.

In April 2013, the facelifted version of March are revealed, with some upgrade on equipment include LED rear lamps, redesigned grille, headlamps, wheels, improved interior and addition of front airbags in all version. The K13 March was discontinued in July 2022.

=== UK ===
From 1992, Micras were built in the UK at the NMUK plant in Sunderland, Tyne and Wear, where a total of 2,368,704 were built at its close in July 2010.

==== K10 ====
The Micra K10 first went on sale the UK over the summer of 1983, and it was an instant sales success. In its best year, 1990, it was the eleventh most popular new car in the UK with just under 50,000 sales. It was a popular choice with driving instructors and undemanding motorists thanks to its ease of driving, solid build and durable mechanical components. 343,411 were sold in nearly a decade. As recently as early 2007, almost 15 years after the last examples were sold, 96,421 examples were still reported to be in circulation, and four years on, as the 20th anniversary of its demise approaches, the number remaining on Britain's roads is likely to be still well into five figures. It compares particularly well to many other popular small cars in Britain of its era, particularly the British-built Austin Metro and Italian Fiat Uno.

==== K11 ====
The second incarnation of the Micra, the K11, was launched in the UK at the end of 1992, with production taking place in Britain at the Sunderland plant rather than in Japan. It was available with a limited range of engines: 1.0 and 1.3 petrol units. A facelift over the summer of 2000 saw the 1.3 shelved and replaced with a 1.4 unit. This upgrade, after a previous makeover in 1998, enhanced the Micra's appeal and it was still fairly popular on the launch of its successor in December 2002.

The Micra K11 (as it is known in Europe), was the third model after the Nissan Bluebird and Primera built in Nissan's NMUK plant in Sunderland, Tyne and Wear.

In 1998, the Sunderland, plant produced its millionth Micra, becoming the first Japanese manufacturer in Europe to achieve the milestone.

==== K12 ====
Like the previous version of the Micra, the third generation model, the K12, was made at the Sunderland plant. It had a wider range of engines, including 1.2 petrol and Renault-sourced 1.5 direct-injection diesel powerplants, and offered an improved driving experience. Its chassis would form the basis of the next Renault Clio, launched in 2005 but still built in France. This stylish, all-new Micra helped Nissan bolster its market share of the supermini sector, which had been declining in the final year or two of its predecessor's life. Although it has never featured in the SMMT's official top 10 best-selling cars in the UK, it has been among the best-selling 10 cars in Britain among private buyers for virtually all of its production life.

In 2003, the BBC's Top Gear programme featured a segment on cars that gave value for money, highlighting specification that could be purchased for £9,000. The Micra K12 was selected and tested by presenter Richard Hammond, who gave it a positive review. This was despite comparing its qualities to those of a Boeing 737, concluding that the Micra "had all the toys". However, when Hammond tested the Micra C+C in 2006, he was less than enthusiastic. This was because his model was coloured pink and as a result, he spent most of the segment driving it with a paper bag over his head, especially during a drive around the town of Ledbury in Herefordshire.

The pink C+C was one of only five, made specifically for Nissan's sponsorship of the C+C TLC Tour in 2005–06, in support of the Breakthrough Breast Cancer charity. Such was the public's response that Nissan subsequently announced the launch of the Micra C+C Pink, limited to 100 units. These quickly sold out and another production run was announced in August 2006, this time limited to 175 cars.

In July 2004, Nissan announced that a Coral Blue K12 Micra had become NMUK's one millionth car for the UK market, and that its Sunderland plant had produced over 250,000 K12s since the model's launch, for sale in up to 45 markets.

In August 2006, the K10 was still receiving credit for its impressive durability. An Auto Express survey revealed that of the 340,000 K10 Micras registered in the UK between 1983 and 1992, 96,000 were still on the road – nearly 30%, an impressive figure for a car which had been out of production for 14 years. This gave it a far higher rating than the Fiat Uno and the Austin Metro, both of which had dwindled away to less than 3%.

In 2007, with the Micra K12C, the model grades were brought into line with the rest of the Nissan UK range, namely Visia, Acenta, Tekna, 160 SR and Active Luxury.

The Micra C+C convertible was available in Visia, Acenta, Tekna and Active Luxury grades. However, the 1.6-litre engine is available for all models, save the Visia.

== Reputation, popularity and sales ==
The K10/K11 generations of Micra were known for reliability, excellent build quality, and user friendliness. The K12 model has received consistently good reviews, with the main criticisms being limited rear seat head room and luggage space.

The insurance company Folksam rated the models produced between 1988 and 1995 as dangerous in the event of a crash. However, safety specifications improved with successive models. The Micra's Euro NCAP ratings are two stars for the K11 and four for the K12.

The K12 Micra came top of its class in What Car? magazine's Security Supertest in 2003, passing both entry and driveaway tests and achieving a maximum score for its locking system and immobiliser.

In 2005, the UK motor insurance research expert Thatcham introduced a standard for keyless go, requiring the device to be inoperable at a distance of more than 10 cm from the vehicle. In an independent test, the Micra was found to be the most secure, while certain BMW and Mercedes models failed, being theoretically capable of allowing cars to be driven away while their owners were refuelling.

In What Car?'s Reliability Supertest in 2007, Nissan was ranked 6th out of 26 manufacturers overall, with the K11 Micra (1998–2002) being its most reliable model.

In Mexico, the Nissan March has been a commercial success because of its affordable price at Mex$150,800, compact dimensions ideal for city driving, and low maintenance and ownership costs. The March has been awarded in the Most Trusted Compact Car category awarded by Reader's Digest Mexico for three consecutive years.

Nissan Micra Sales Figures
Year	Japan	Europe	Brazil	Mexico	Canada	China	Indonesia	Australia
1994	128,887							
1995	132,147							
1996	131,830							
1997	143,965	147,196						
1998	94,712	151,262						
1999	60,430	144,233						
2000	62,902	129,400						
2001	60,425	114,472						
2002	139,332	106,476						
2003	123,709	171,453						
2004	102,792	164,295						
2005	62,505	153,424		2,281				
2006	50,316	124,003		1,403				
2007	45,693	82,213		501				
2008	46,686	78,827		120				
2009	31,433	83,371		-				
2010	49,193	70,857		-		14,705	1,915	
2011	50,274	75,699	6,928	18,995		16,225	12,345	
2012	39,694	58,293	33,152	25,306		6,720	7,740	9,162
2013	27,711	48,088	24,257	22,773		2,975	7,968	
2014		60,318	24,654	36,565	7,815	6,926	6,110	2,419
2015		66,147	22,940	49,658	11,909	1,166	4,564	1,243
2016		60,212	18,381	55,918	9,896	86	2,099	1,525
2017		86,489	14,053	54,063	8,812	2	2,416	
2018		77,815	11,947	53,780	5,372		1,159	
2019		65,240	6,897	49,493	6,361		202	
2020		39,721	3,232	38,393	3,277			
2021		36,340	64	34,974				
2022		32,204		28,986				
2023				30,595				
2024				27,926				
2025				31,401				

=== In popular culture ===
An abandoned Nissan Micra formed a key part of one of the artworks in Banksy's London animal series in the summer of 2024. The piece, depicting a spray-painted rhinoceros mounting a car with a traffic cone placed on its bonnet, was painted in Charlton, London. The car was later towed away and the artwork defaced, although it was recreated for an exhibition in Manchester in 2026.

== Motorsport ==
Nissan first entered the Micra in motorsports with the March Superturbo R. Introduced in 1987, this rare pre-facelift K10 weighed in at 740 kg (1,631 lb) with half interior, roll cage and tool kit. It was built for the new sub-1600 cc Group A class, and shortly after in 1988 Nissan released the March Superturbo as a road car.

While the March was a favourite with the drivers in the Japanese Rally Championship, veteran Swedish rally driver Per Eklund finished the 1988 RAC Rally in 21st position and the 1989 Acropolis Rally Greece in 10th place.

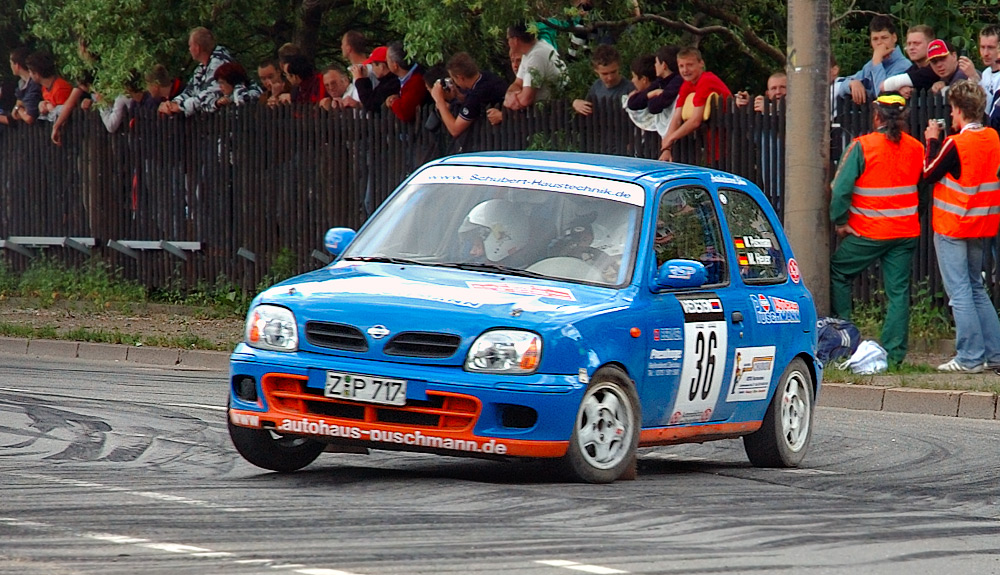
A Micra K11C at the German Saxony Rally

During the K11's production life, there was a series of national rally championship trophies held all over Europe called the Micra Challenge. This was intended as a cheap introduction to rallying, as the cars all had identical 1.3 L race-prepared engines. The UK series ran between 1995 and 1999. This model is still used in club and national rallies. In France, the 1.3 L model was used as the basis for a circuit racing one-make cup for celebrity drivers, the Nissan Stars Cup. In Portugal, the Micra spawned a one-make trophy alongside the National Rally Championship for Beginners.

In the late 1990s, a K11 was adapted into a VQ30 mid-engined 4WD configuration to race in the Trophée Andros, the French ice racing series. Drivers who raced this car include Érik Comas, Philippe Gache, Stéphane Peterhansel and Emmanuel Collard.

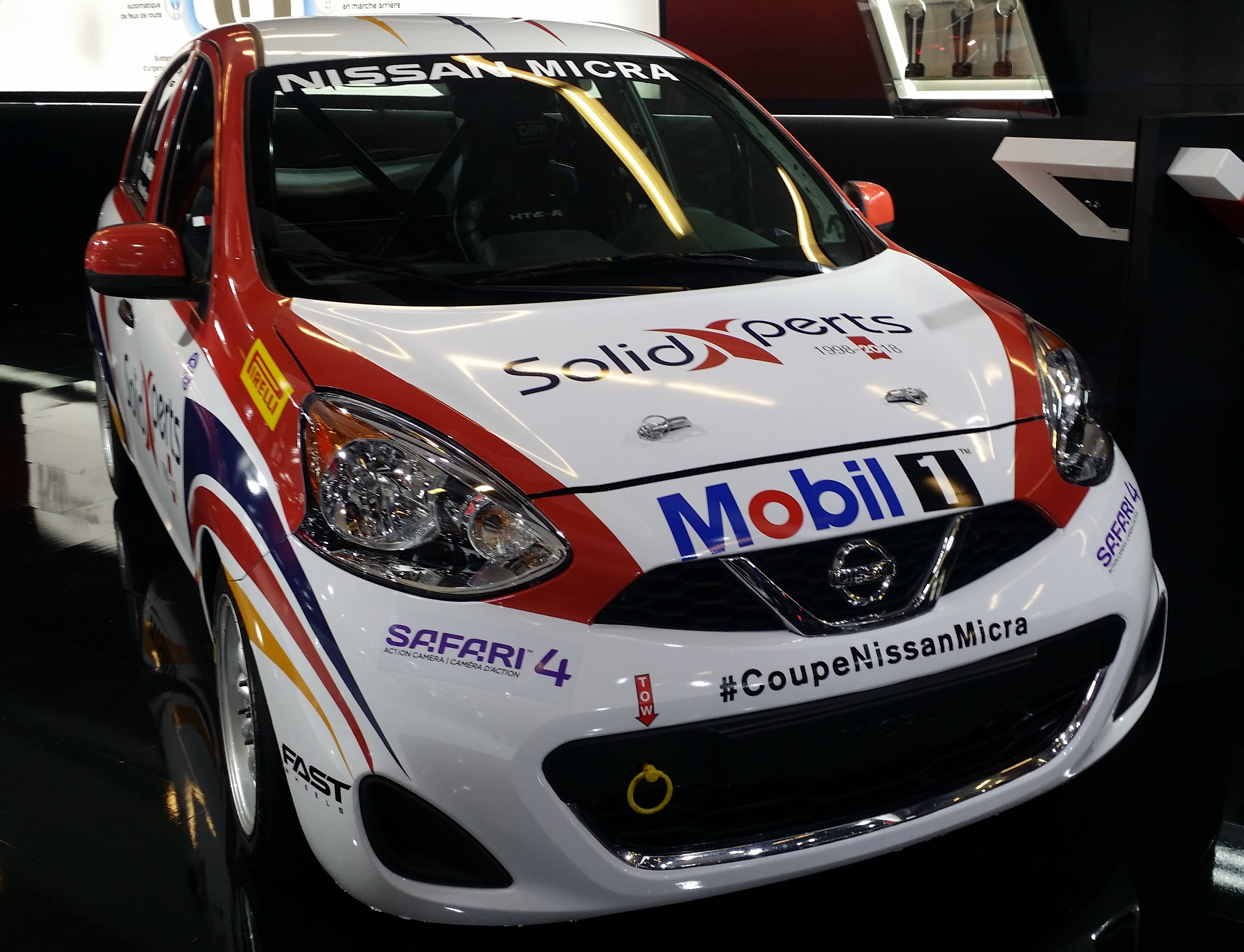
A Nissan Micra Cup (K13C) in Montréal, Canada

Nissan sponsors a one-make series in Japan called the March Cup, which has been running since the introduction of the K10. Usually a JGTC support race, it is held in two separate five-round championships called West Japan Series and East Japan Series, and a ladies series running simultaneously. At the end of the season, the best-performing cars from both sides meet up for the Champions Cup final at the end the season.

Beginning of 2015, Nissan Canada sponsored the Nissan Micra Cup. It consisted of 10 races across 5 weekends in Quebec. Each racing weekend included a 30-minute trial, a 30-minute qualifying session, and two 30-minute races.

The 2nd generation Micra is the basis for the 1 Litre Hotrod Formula of British Stock Car Racing.
