= Mitsuoka Viewt =

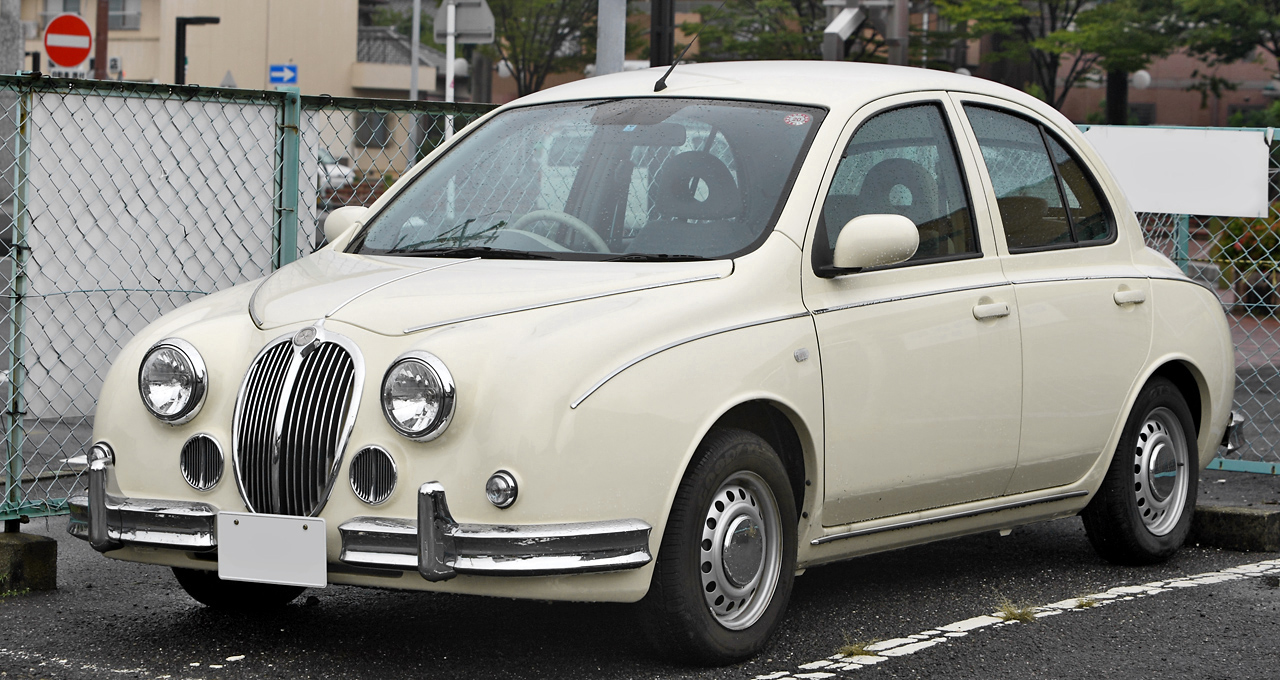
- Mitsuoka Viewt (K12)

Overview
- Manufacturer: Mitsuoka
- Production: 1993–present

Body and chassis
- Class: Subcompact car (B)
- Related: Nissan March (1993–2023); Toyota Yaris (XP210) (Story, 2023–present)

The Mitsuoka Viewt (Japanese: 光岡・ビュート, Hepburn: Mittsuoka Byūto) is a series of retro-styled subcompact cars sold by the Japanese automaker Mitsuoka, intended to resemble the 1963 Jaguar Mark 2. The Viewt is Mitsuoka's best- selling model.

It was based on the Nissan March until 2023, when the March was replaced by the Note. The Viewt Story, which was introduced in February 2023, is based on the Toyota Yaris (XP210) hatchback. The line was launched in January 1993. Over the thirty-year production period of the Nissan-based Viewt, around 13,000 examples were sold. The Viewt, along with Mitsuoka's later Galue, encouraged larger Japanese manufacturers to produce retro-styled versions of their own cars.

The model is manufactured by transporting completed March and Yaris cars to Toyama, where the interior and exterior of the body are disassembled and customized by hand.

== First generation (K11; 1993–2003) ==
First generation
- Mitsuoka Viewt K11

Overview
- Production: 1993–2003

Body and chassis
- Body style: 4-door sedan; 2-door cabriolet (1997–2003); 3-door hatchback (1997–2003); 5-door hatchback (1997–2003)
- Layout: Front-engine, front-wheel-drive
- Related: Nissan March (second generation)

Powertrain
- Engine: 1.0 L CG10DE I4 (K11); 1.3 L CG13DE I4 (HK11)
- Transmission: 5-speed manual; 4-speed automatic; CVT

Dimensions
- Wheelbase: 2,360 mm (92.9 in)
- Length: 4,250 mm (167.3 in)
- Width: 1,640 mm (64.6 in)
- Height: 1,425 mm (56.1 in)
- Curb weight: 870 kg (1,918 lb)

The first Viewt, introduced in January 1993, was produced on the basis of the K11 March. The March's hatchback was replaced by a fixed rear window and rounded boot, and the front grille and headlamp assembly was replaced by one closely resembling that of the Jaguar Mark II. In standard form the interior was much the same as the March's, but leather seats and wood trim could be added at extra cost.

The Viewt shared its 1.0- and 1.3-litre engines with the March. It was originally available with manual or automatic transmissions; later, more luxurious editions were automatic-only. In November 2001 the larger engine's displacement was increased from 1,275 to 1,348 cc (77.8 to 82.3 cu in), reflecting changes made to the March/Micra.

Changes to the March were usually echoed in the Viewt; for example, when the March received a new dashboard the Viewt received it too, with a new wood kit. After the March convertible was introduced in 1997, Mitsuoka developed a Viewt convertible which used the Jaguar-style front but had a unique built-out rear. At the same time, the Viewt was also made available in 3- and 5-door hatchback models.

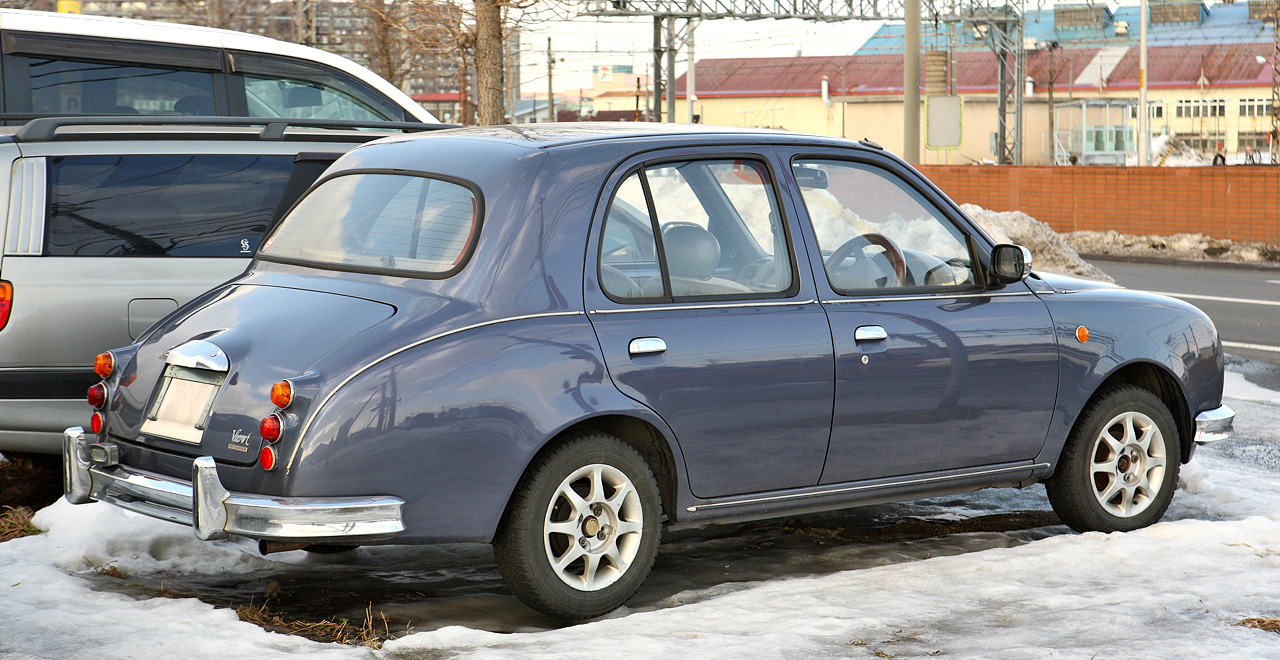
Rear view

1998 Mitsuoka Viewt Convertible

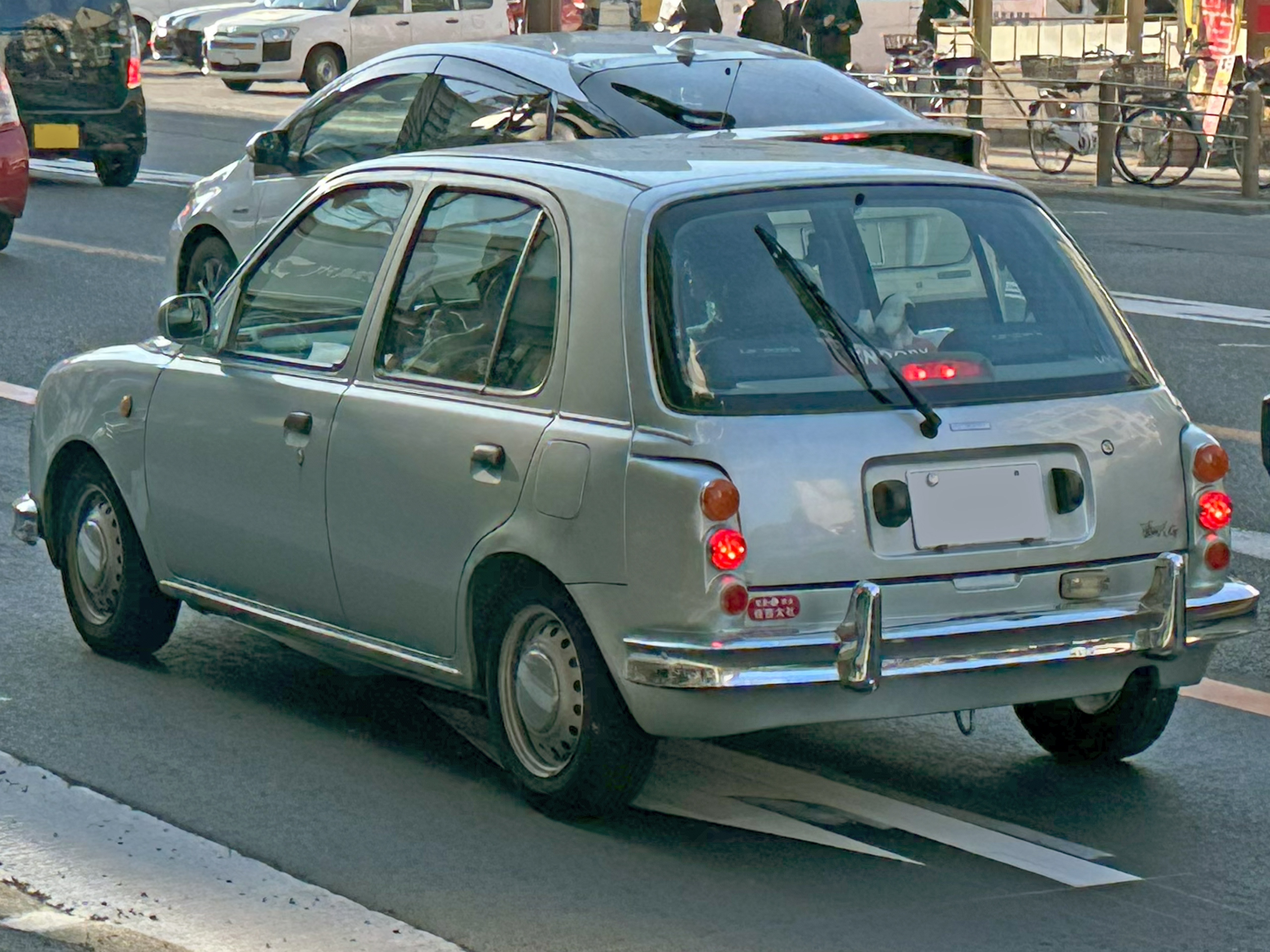
Mitsuoka Viewt 5-door; rear view

== Second generation (K12; 2005–2010) ==
Second generation

Overview
- Also called: Mitsuoka Cute (hatchback model; 2009–2013)
- Production: 2005–2010; 2009–2013 (Cute)
- Designer: Takanori Aoki

Body and chassis
- Body style: 4-door sedan; 5-door hatchback (Cute)
- Layout: Front-engine, front-wheel-drive; Front-engine, four-wheel drive
- Related: Nissan March (third generation)

Powertrain
- Engine: 1.2 L CR12DE I4; 1.4 L CR14DE I4; 1.5 L HR15DE I4
- Transmission: 5-speed manual; CVT

Dimensions
- Wheelbase: 24,530 mm (965.7 in)
- Length: 4,400 mm (173.2 in)
- Width: 1,680 mm (66.1 in)
- Height: 1,520–1,530 mm (59.8–60.2 in)
- Curb weight: 1,040–1,130 kg (2,293–2,491 lb)

When the March was updated (becoming the K12) Mitsuoka produced a new Viewt, which first appeared in September 2005. The changes in the style of the March are evident to some extent in the new Viewt: for example, the shape of the rear door has changed and the cabin appears rounder. However, Mitsuoka retained their Jaguar-style front and rear. New safety rules introduced for 2009 meant that Viewts could not be based on cars built after 1 January 2009; Mitsuoka continued converting 2008-built cars and then briefly halted production. The only three-door version was the 12SR, which was created by converting used March 12SRs and sold through Mitsuoka's certified used car program. Mitsuoka also built the Mitsuoka Cute (光岡・キュート, Mitsuoka kyūto) from March 2009 until 2013, a similar conversion based on the regular March hatchback. Buyers could choose to base the Cute on any certified, used K12 March, with prices depending on age and mileage.

In October 2009 production resumed; to meet the revised safety legislation, the rear end received enclosed taillights and the bumper overriders were deleted. The revised version was first shown at the 2009 Tokyo Motor Show. Production of new, K12-based Viewts ended in the latter half of 2010, but Mitsuoka continued converting used cars until at least 2013.

Like the March, the second-generation Viewt was available with 1.2-, 1.4- and 1.5-litre engines, with automatic or manual transmissions. The interior resembled the March's; leather seats were optionally available. The 12SR version used some of the March 12SR's interior decoration, such as carbon fibre inserts on the dashboard.

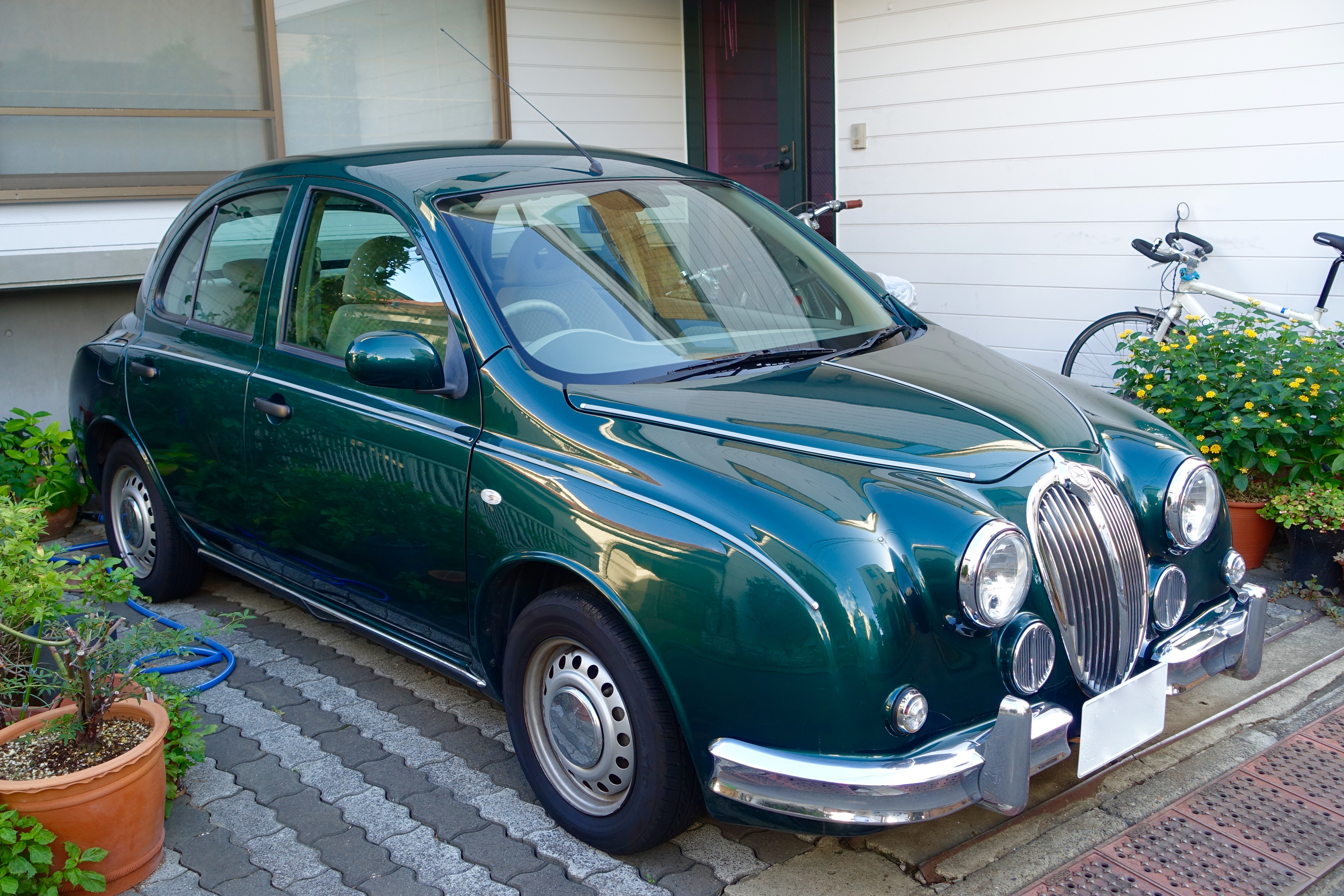
Mitsuoka Viewt (K12)

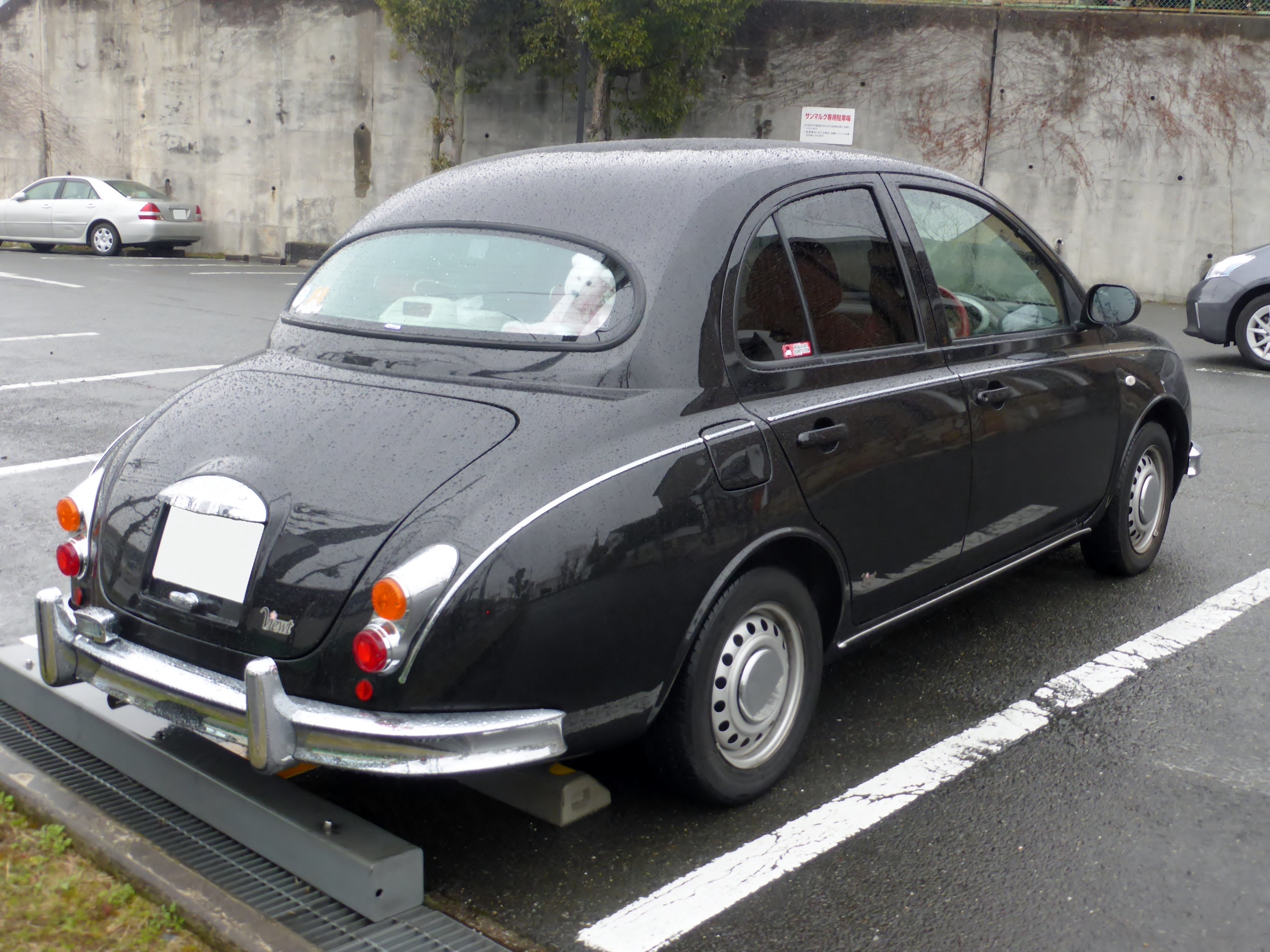
Rear view

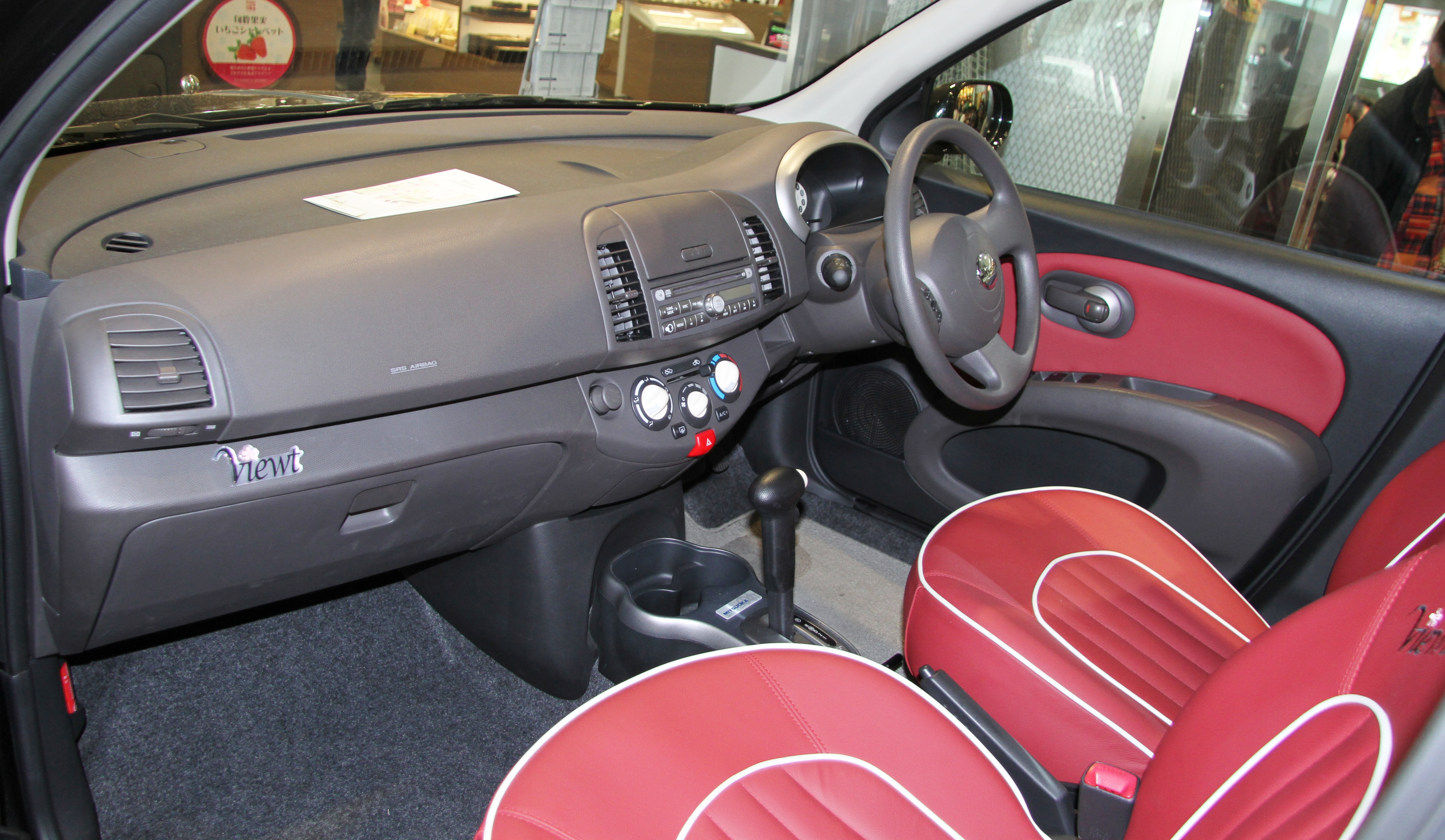
Interior (Viewt 12LX)

== Third generation (K13; 2012–2023) ==
Third generation
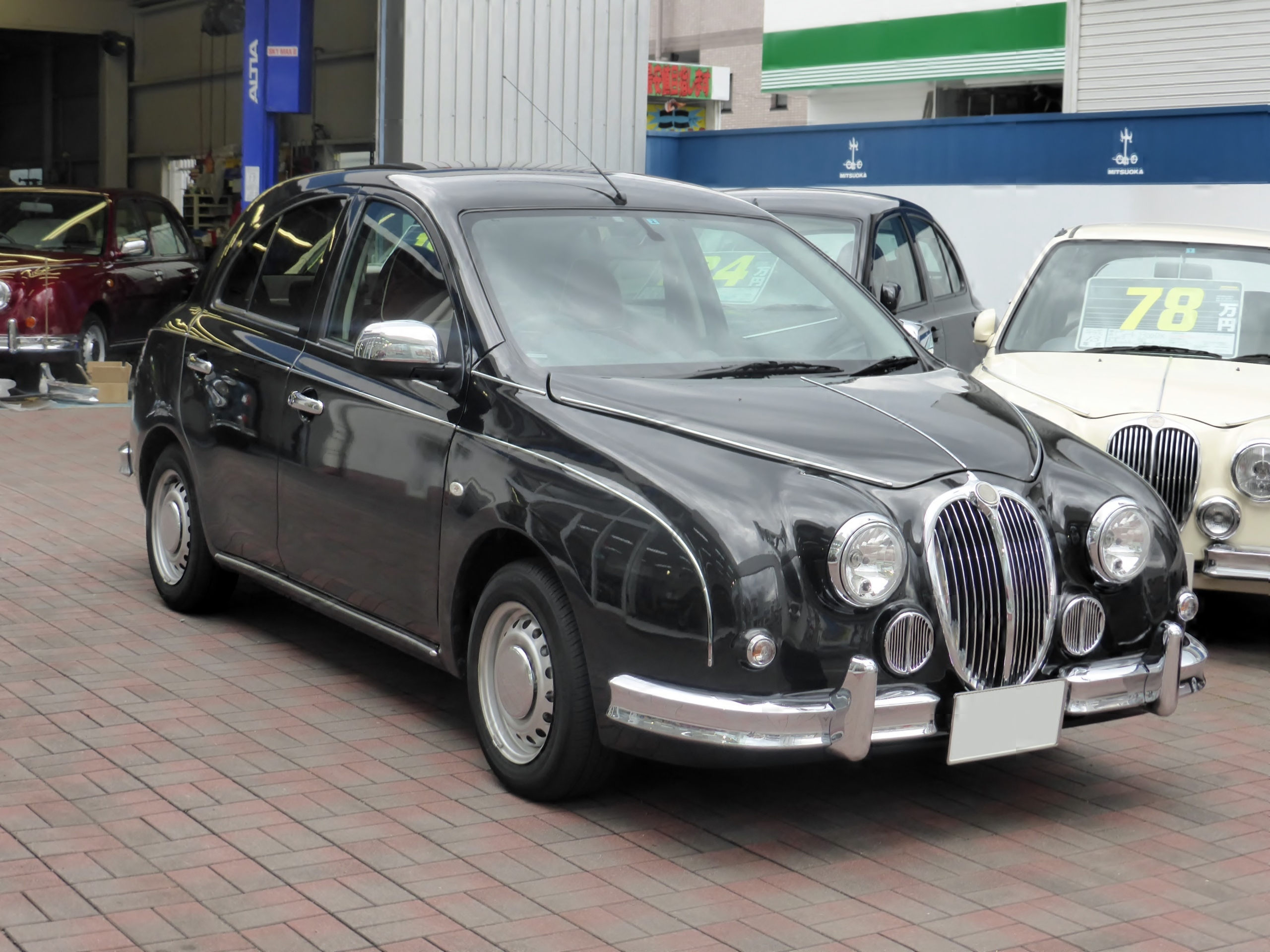
- Mitsuoka Viewt 12ST

Overview
- Also called: Mitsuoka Viewt Nadeshiko (hatchback model, 2015–2023)
- Production: May 2012–January 2023

Body and chassis
- Body style: 4-door sedan; 5-door hatchback (2015–2023)
- Layout: Front-engine, front-wheel-drive; Front-engine, four-wheel drive
- Related: Nissan March (fourth generation)

Powertrain
- Engine: 1.2 L HR12DE I4
- Transmission: CVT

Dimensions
- Wheelbase: 2,450 mm (96.5 in)
- Length: 4,515 mm (177.8 in); 3,980 mm (156.7 in) (Nadeshiko)
- Width: 1,680 mm (66.1 in); 1,665 mm (65.6 in) (Nadeshiko)
- Height: 1,515–1,560 mm (59.6–61.4 in)
- Curb weight: 960–1,150 kg (2,116–2,535 lb)

The third- generation Viewt was based on the Thai-built K13 March and first appeared in March 2012 at the 2012 Bangkok Motor Show. It went on sale on 23 May 2012 and was available in four grades: 12ST, 12ST Premium, 12LX and 12DX. In this generation, a CVT was standard on all grades.

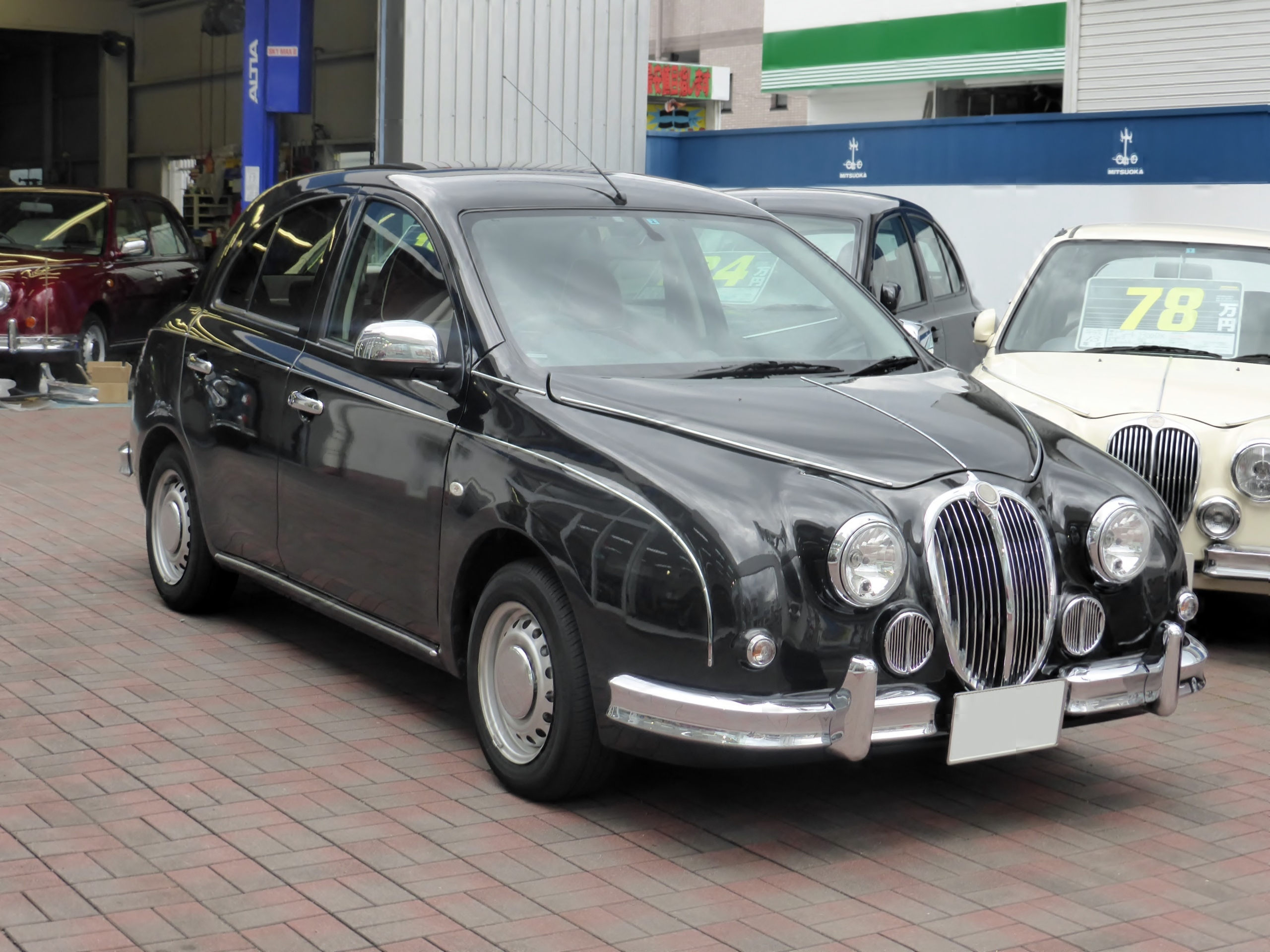
Mitsuoka Viewt (K13)

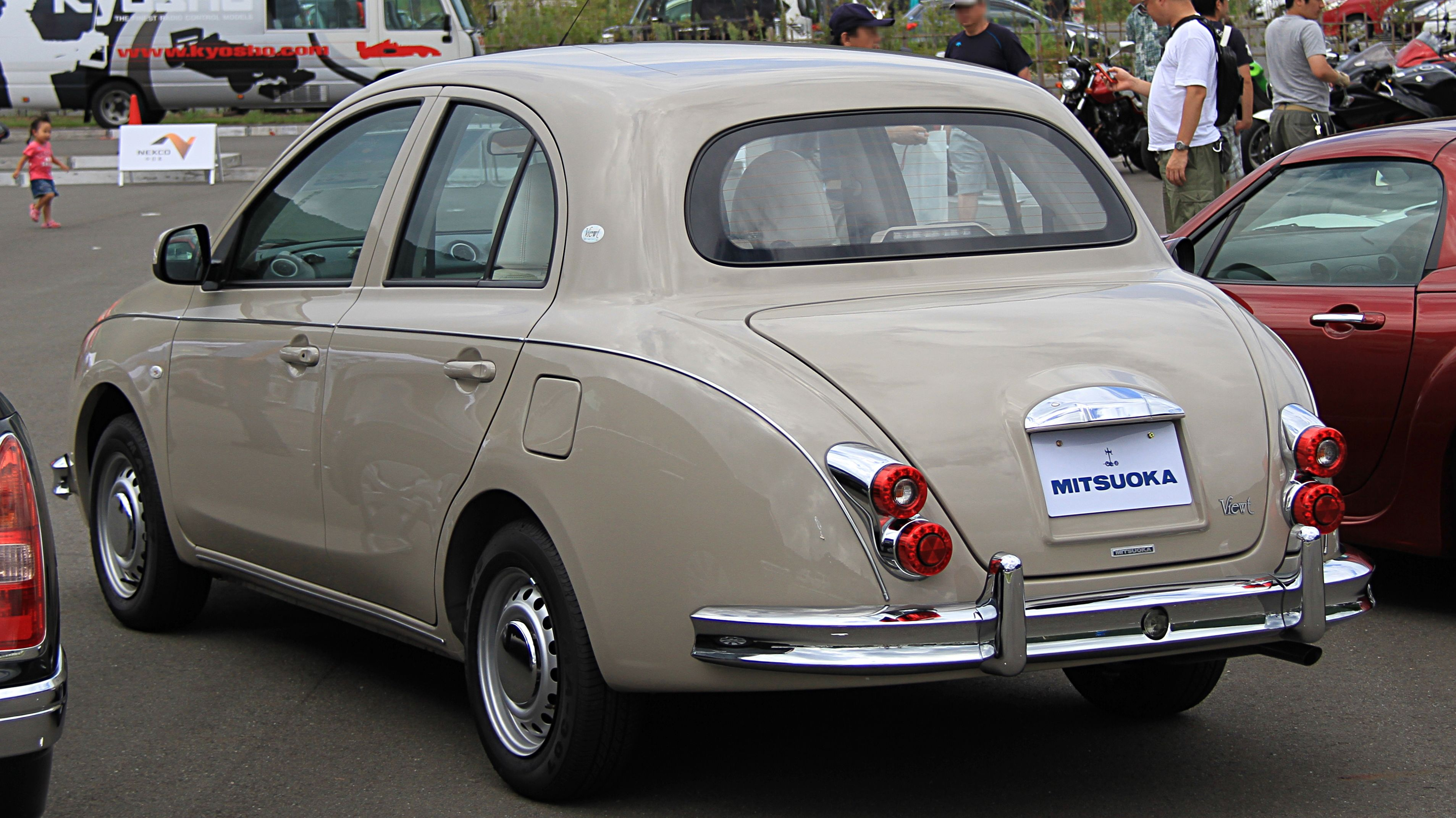
Rear view

Interior

=== Viewt Nadeshiko (2015–2023) ===
The hatchback version, called the Viewt Nadeshiko, first appeared on 15 July 2015 and was sold in parallel with the regular Viewt. Since it used the taillights and tail lamps from the Nissan March directly, its price was significantly lower than that of the Viewt saloon. The overall width was 15 cm less, due to the redesigned front and rear bumpers. With the discontinuation of the March in the Japanese market, Mitsuoka announced the end of Viewt production in January 2023. However, Mitsuoka continued to carry out conversions on suitable used Nissans. Unlike the regular Viewt, the Nadeshiko was offered only with front-wheel drive.

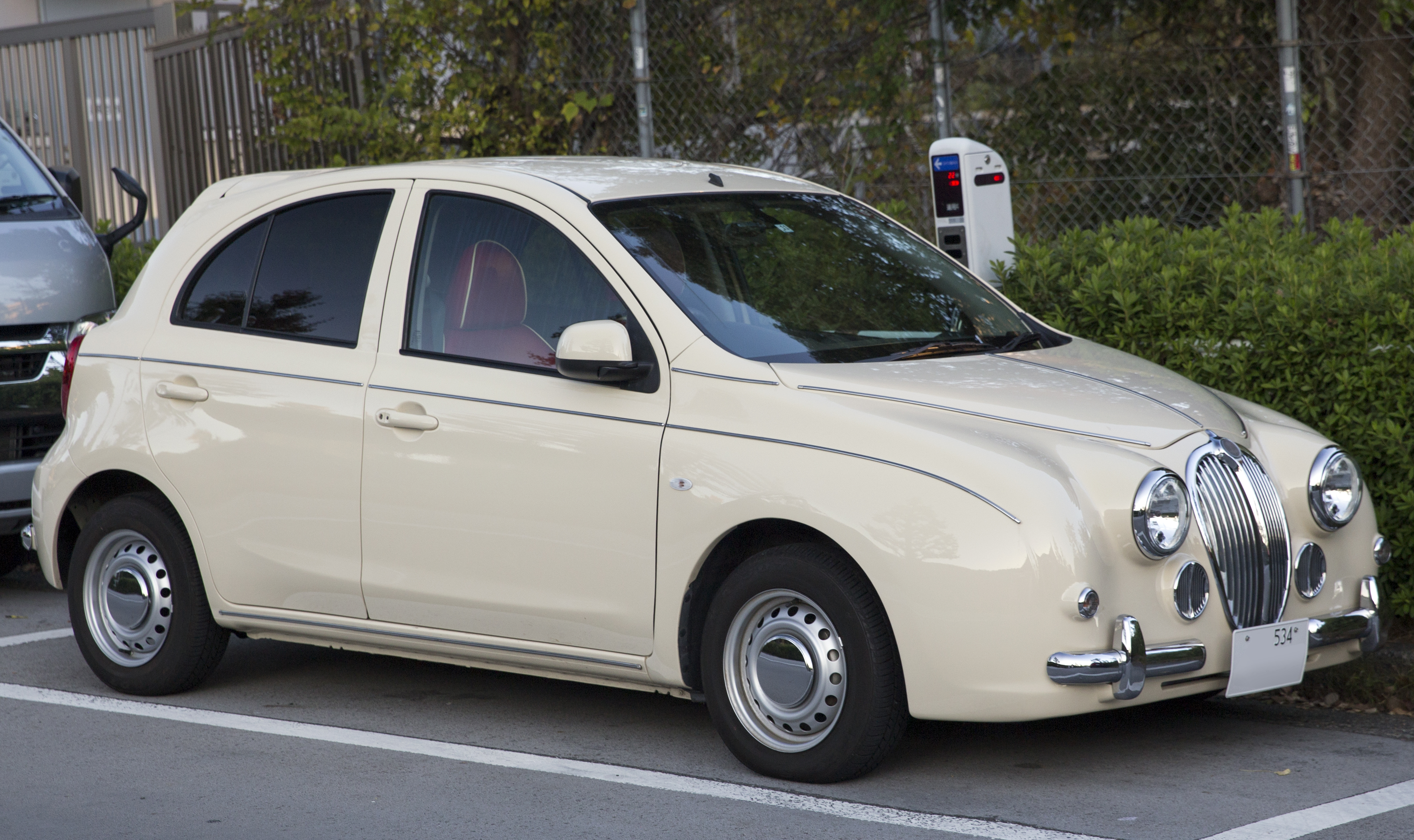
Mitsuoka Viewt Nadeshiko

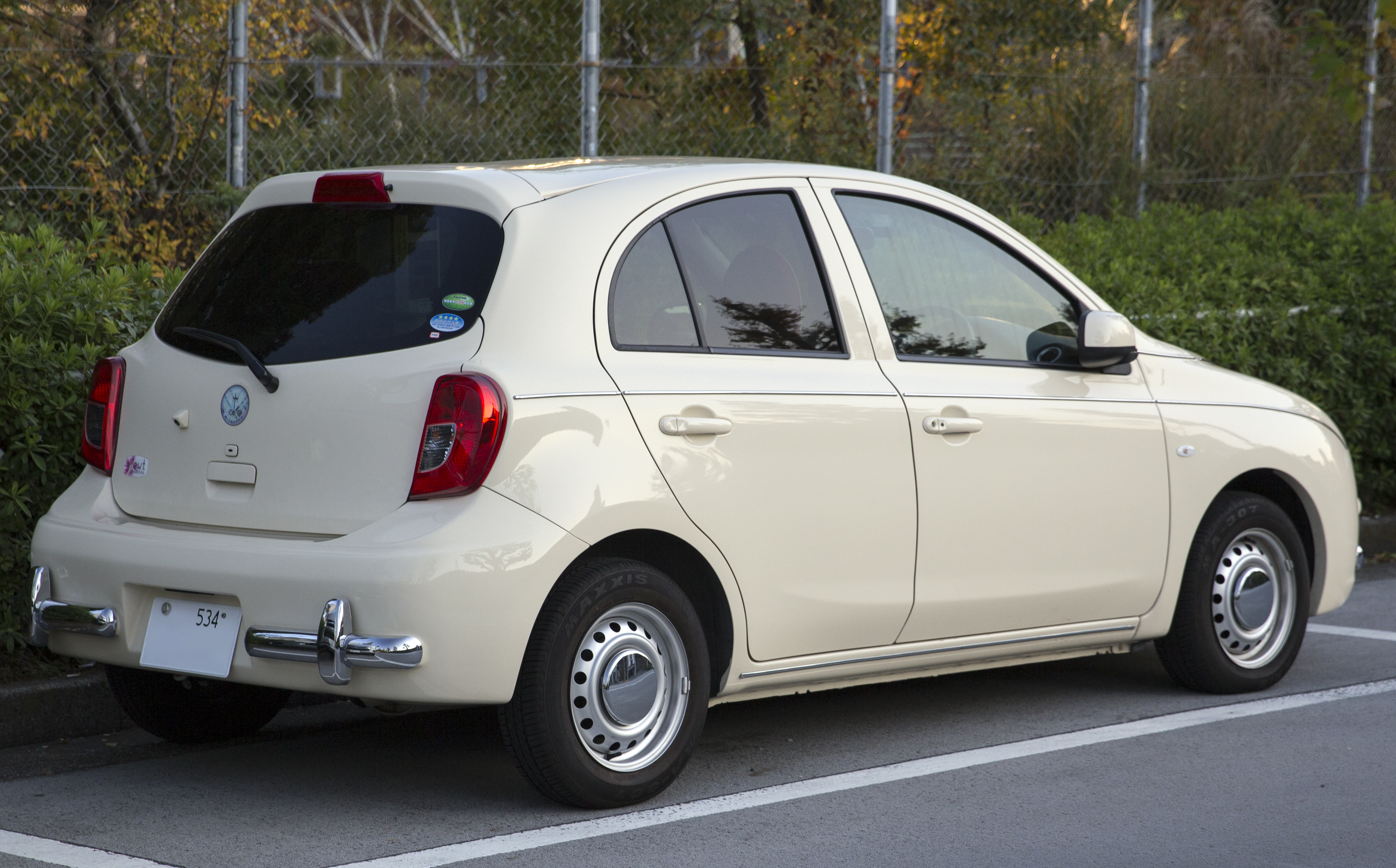
Rear view

== Fourth generation (XP210; 2023–present) ==
Mitsuoka Viewt Story
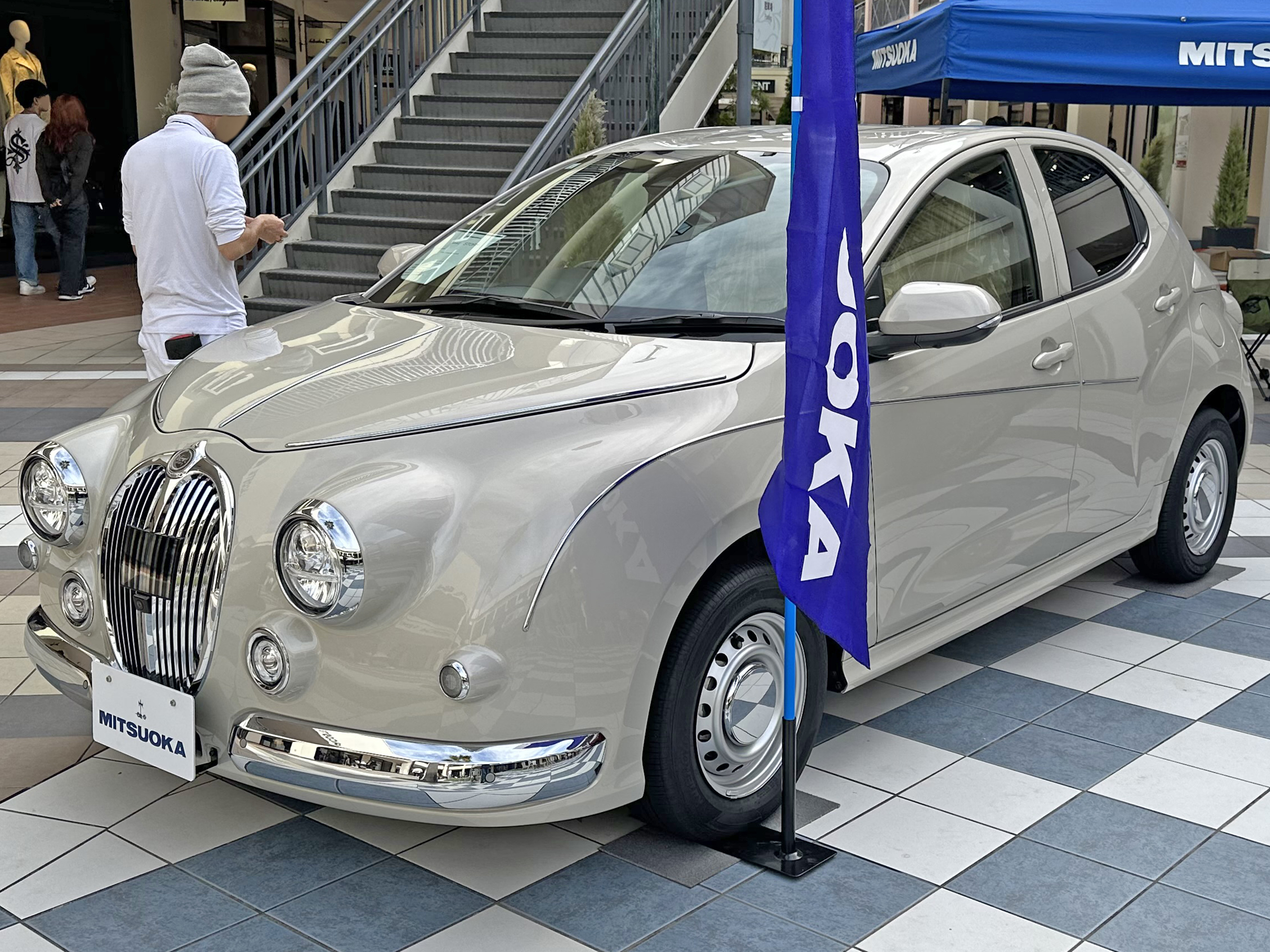
- Mitsuoka Viewt Story 15DX

Overview
- Production: January 2023–present

Body and chassis
- Body style: 5-door hatchback
- Layout: Front-engine, front-wheel-drive; Front-engine, four-wheel-drive
- Related: Toyota Yaris (XP210)

Powertrain
- Engine: Petrol: 996 cc 1KR-FE I3 (KSP210/211; 2023–2026); 1490 cc M15A-FKS I3 (MXPA10/11/15); Petrol hybrid: 1490 cc M15A-FXE I3 (MXPH10/11/15)
- Electric motor: 59 kW (80 PS; 79 hp) 1NM AC synchronous (front, hybrid); 3.9 kW (5.3 PS; 5.2 hp) 1MM AC synchronous (rear, hybrid)
- Transmission: 5-speed manual (1.0 L FWD); 6-speed manual (1.5 L FWD); K120 CVT with physical first gear; eCVT (hybrid)
- Hybrid drivetrain: Power-split
- Battery: Lithium-ion

The fourth- generation Viewt, called the Viewt Story, is based on the Toyota Yaris (XP210) hatchback and was introduced in February 2023; it was released for sale in September 2023. The model lineup includes 1.5-liter gasoline vehicles "15LX" and "15DX", 1.0-liter gasoline vehicles "10LX" and "10DX", and 1.5-liter hybrid vehicles "Hybrid LX" and "Hybrid DX". In addition, a 6-speed manual transmission is available for the 1.5-liter model, and a 4WD model (E-four for the hybrid) is available for the 1.5-liter and hybrid models.

The 1.0-liter variant produces 51 kW (69 PS; 68 hp), while the 1.5-liter petrol variant produces between 88 and 92 kW (120 and 125 PS; 118 and 123 hp) . The internal combustion engine of the Hybrid model produces 67 kW (91 PS; 90 hp); combined system output is 85 kW (116 PS; 114 hp). The 1.0-liter was discontinued in May 2026.

Rear view

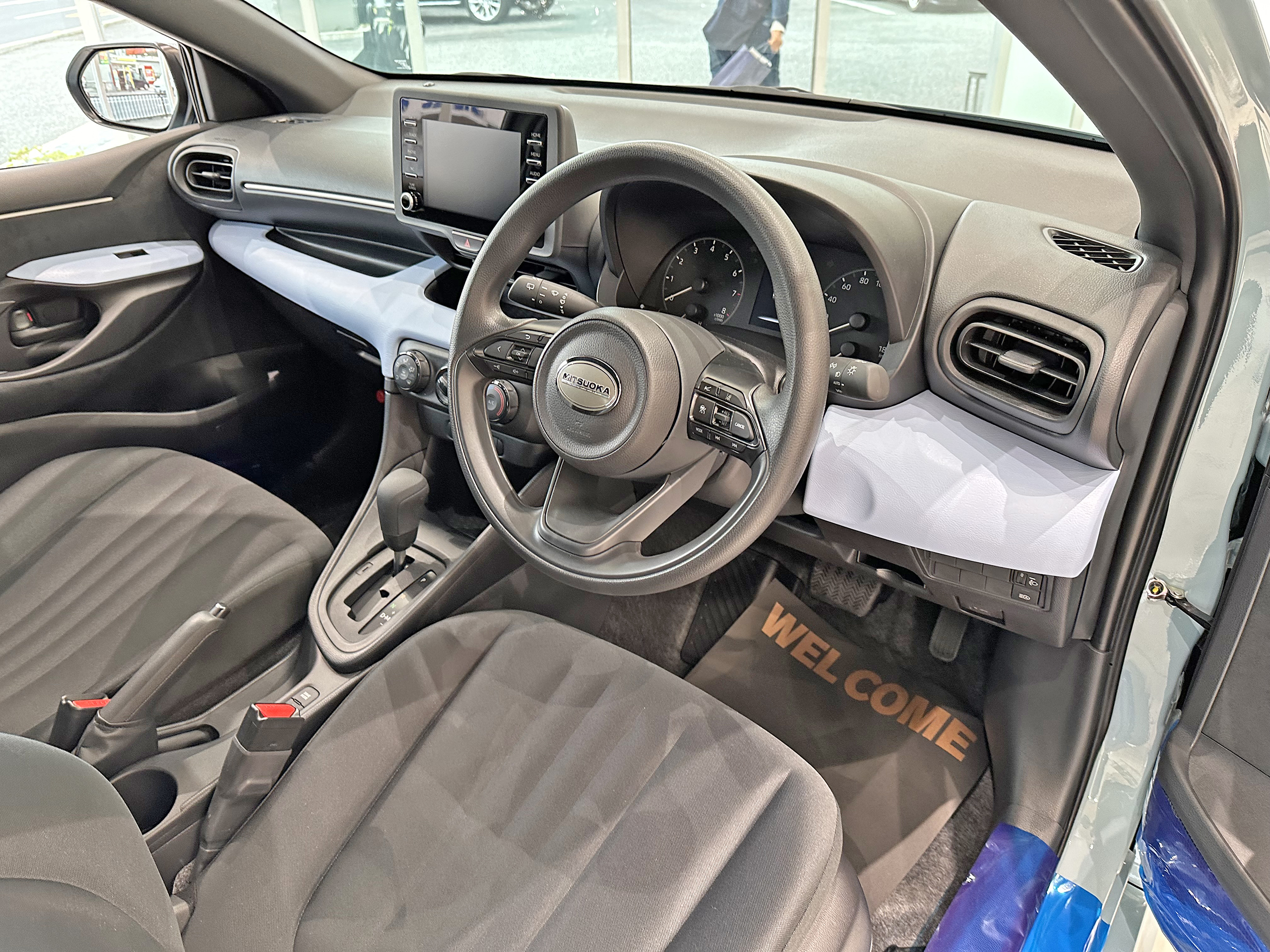
Interior

Viewt Story emblem
