= Nissan Cube =

Model of car

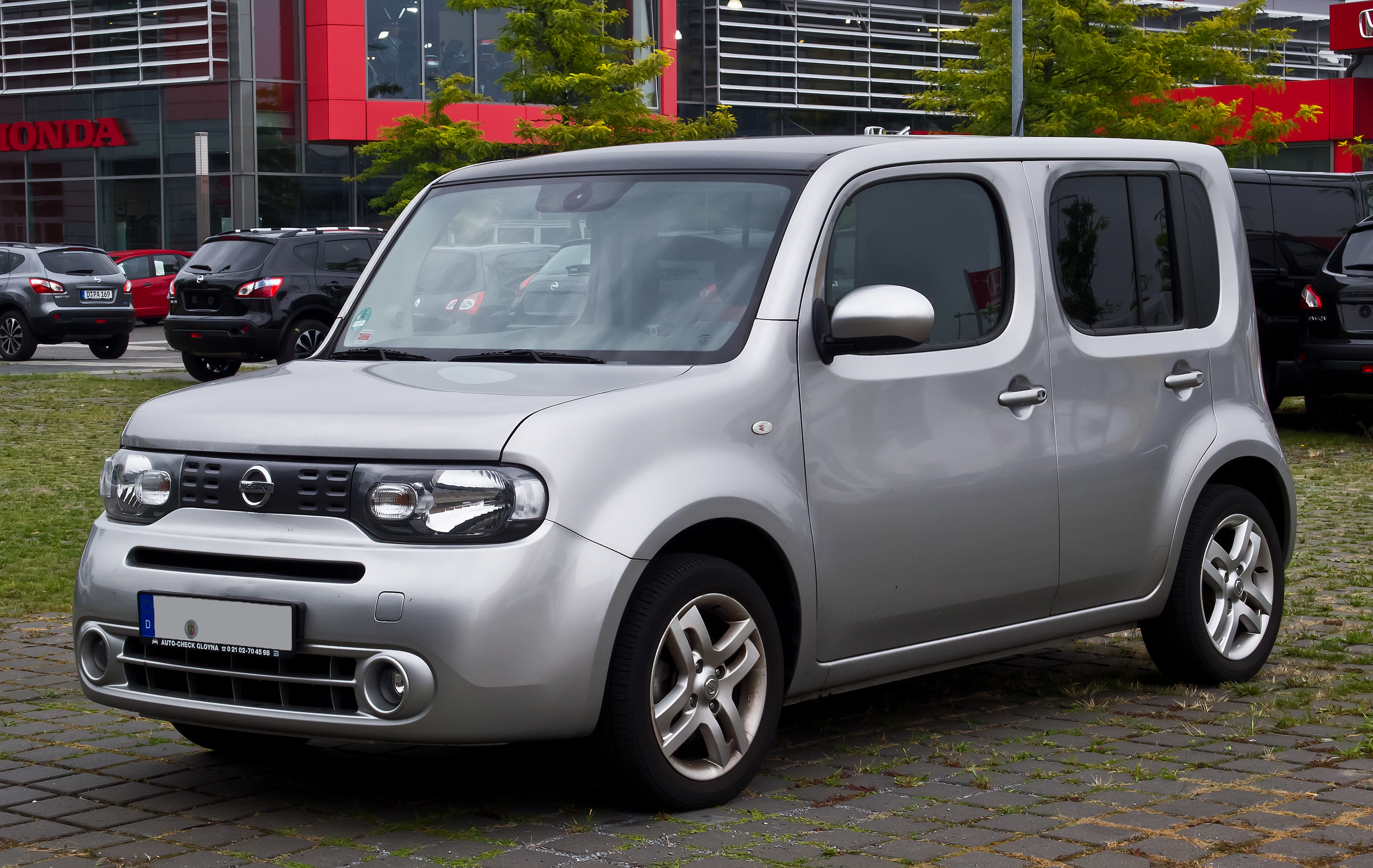

Overview
- Manufacturer: Nissan
- Production: 1998–2019
- Model years: 2009–2014 (North America)
- Assembly: Japan: Yokosuka, Kanagawa (Oppama Plant)

Body and chassis
- Class: Mini MPV
- Body style: 5-door hatchback
- Layout: Front-engine, front-wheel-drive; Front-engine, four-wheel-drive
- Platform: Nissan B platform

The Nissan Cube is a mini MPV produced by carmaker Nissan between 1998 and 2019. Initially sold only in Japan, the Cube was sold in North American markets from 2009 to 2014, and in European markets from 2009 to 2011. In Japan, it was exclusive to Nissan Red Stage dealerships. It is a slightly larger load-carrying alternative to the Nissan Micra hatchback. While production for the North American market ended in 2014, the Japanese-market Cube lasted until December 2019.

== First generation (Z10; 1998) ==
First generation
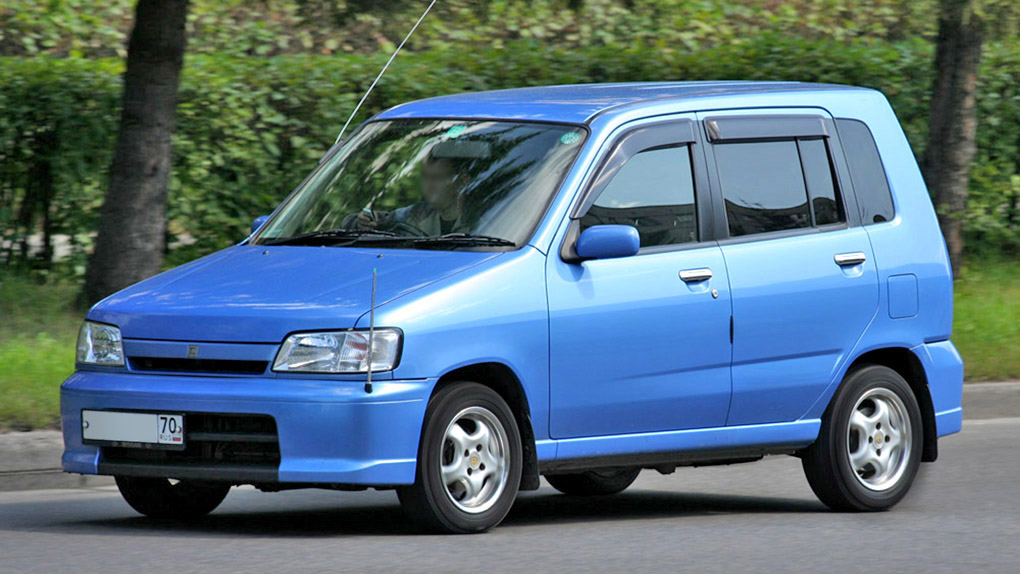

Overview
- Model code: Z10
- Production: 1998–2002

Body and chassis
- Related: Nissan March/Micra

Powertrain
- Engine: 1275 cc CG13DE I4; 1348 cc CGA3DE I4
- Transmission: 4-speed automatic; CVT

The first-generation Cube was introduced in 1998. It shared the same platform as the Nissan Micra (known as the March in Japan and Southeast Asia), as well as the same 1.3 L inline-four engine. A continuously variable transmission and four-wheel drive were optional. The Cube helped narrow the gap in the Nissan lineup between the March and the Sunny.

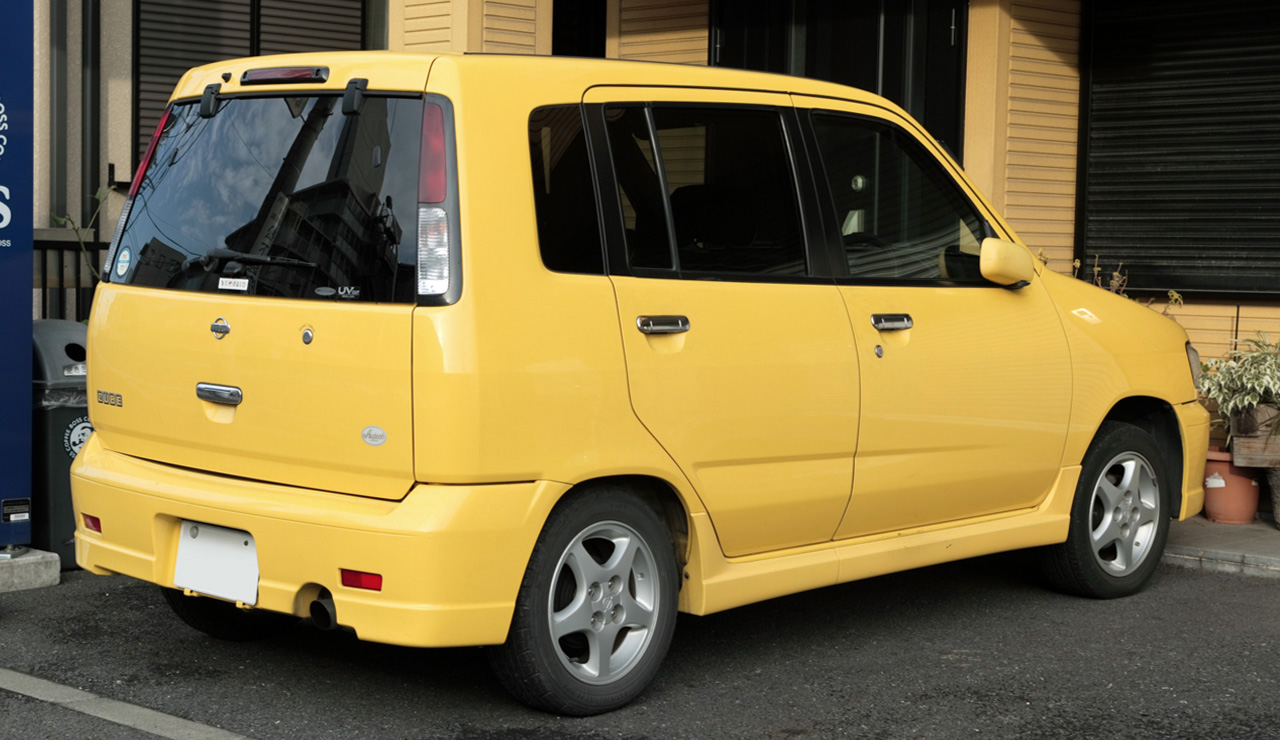
Rear view

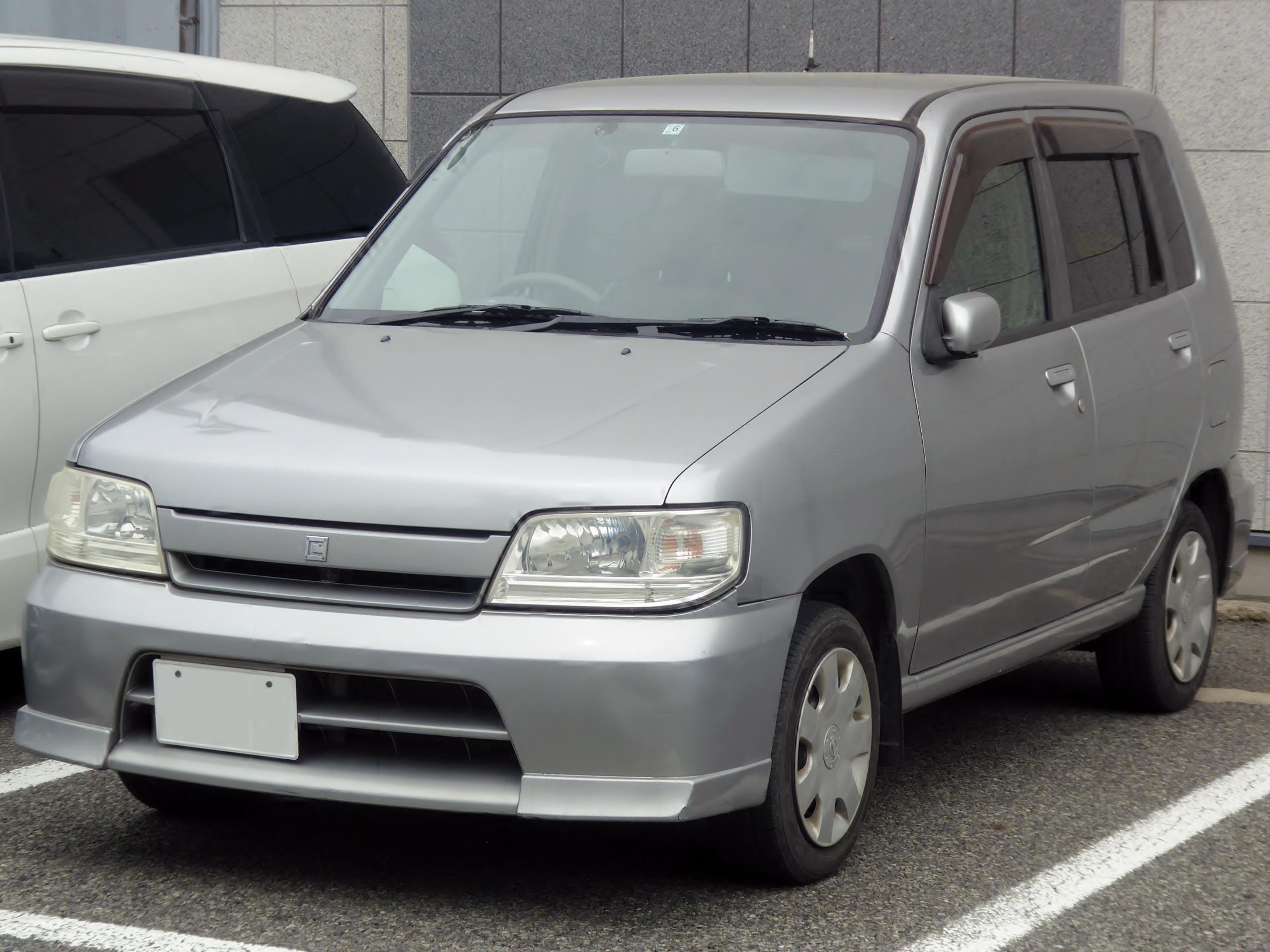
Cube S

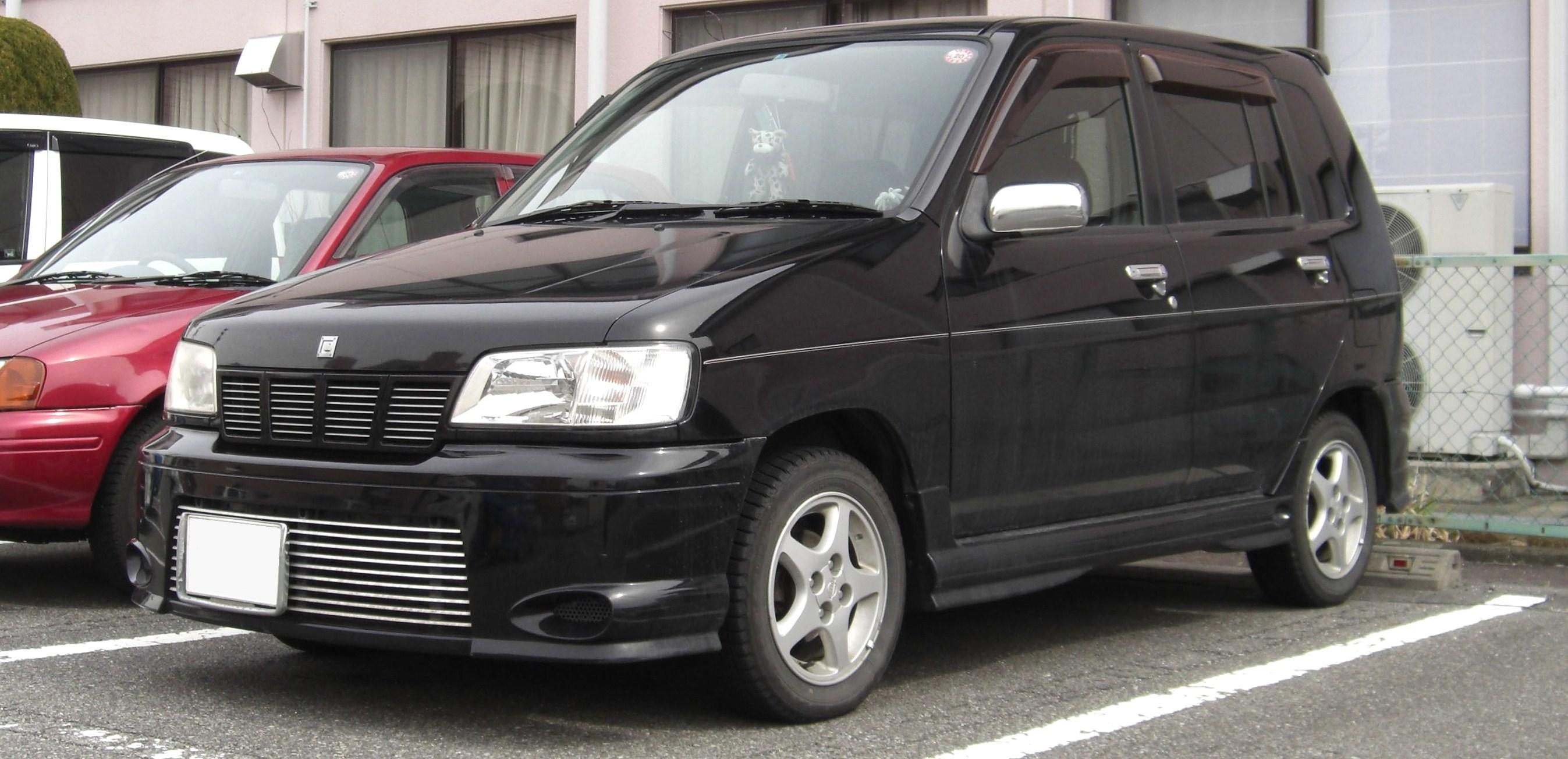
Cube Rider

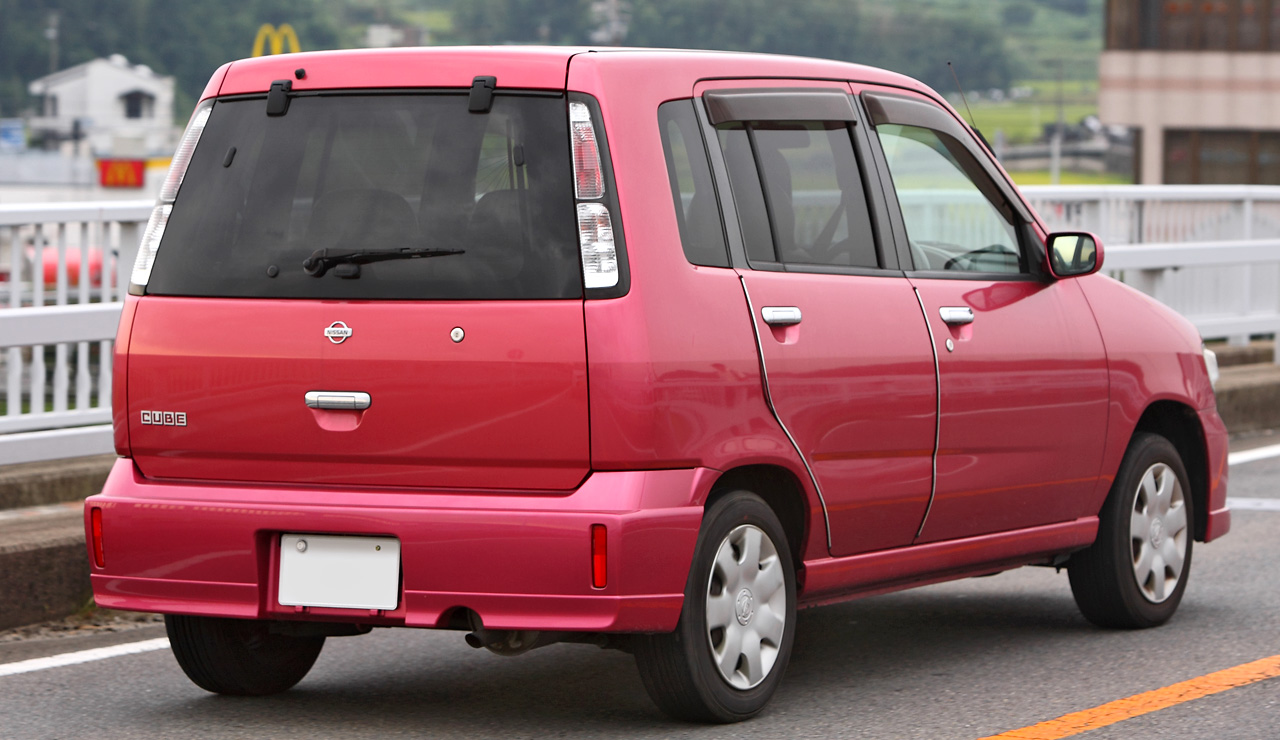
Facelift

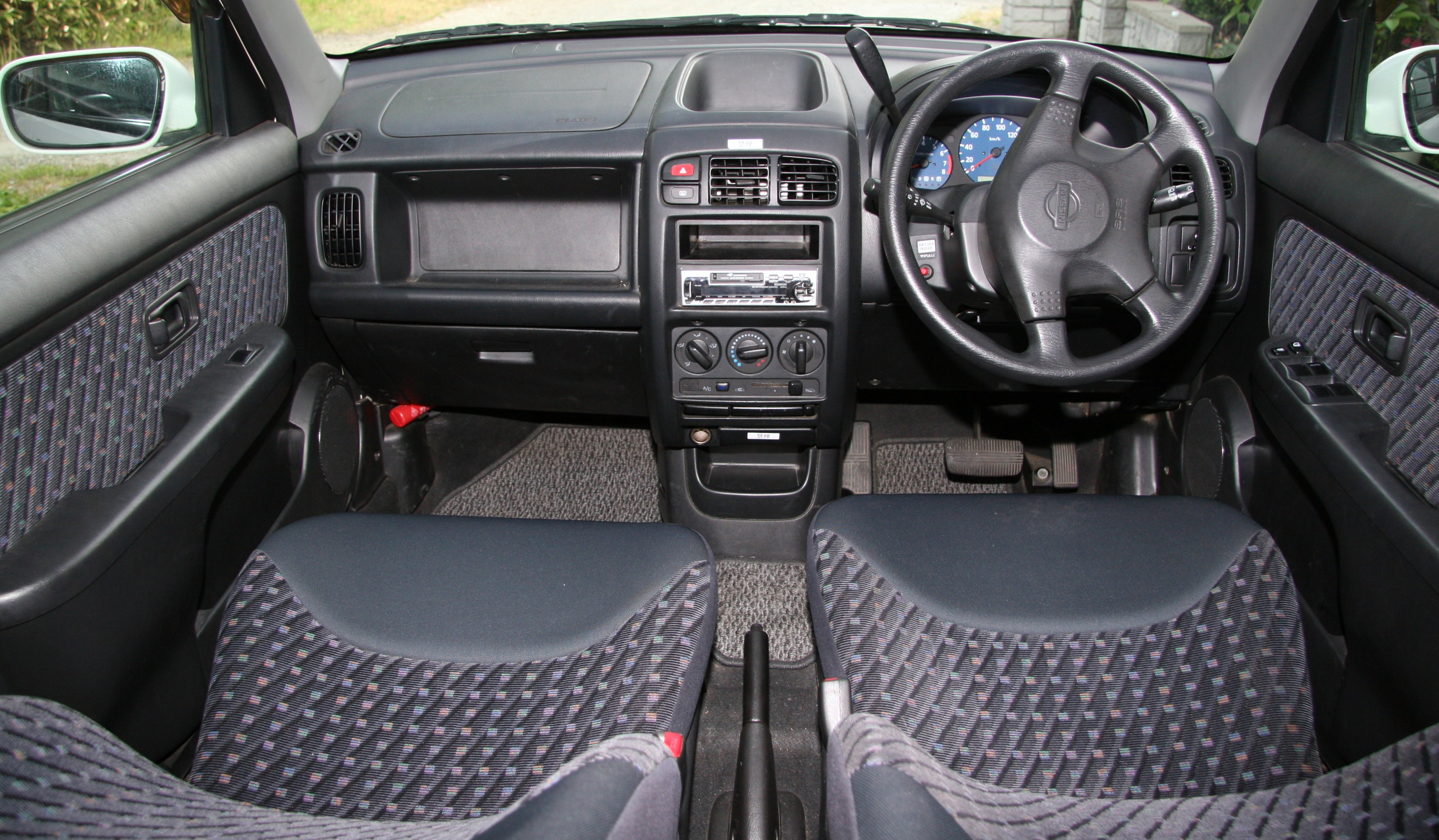
Interior

=== Mitsuoka Yuga (2000–2001) ===
The Mitsuoka Yuga (光岡・ユーガ) is an aftermarket modified version of the Cube. It was launched in March 2000. Its design was inspired by the London Taxi. Each drivetrain type had two trim levels: the base grade Deluxe and the higher-end Royal. The higher-end model is equipped with features such as power windows and central locking.

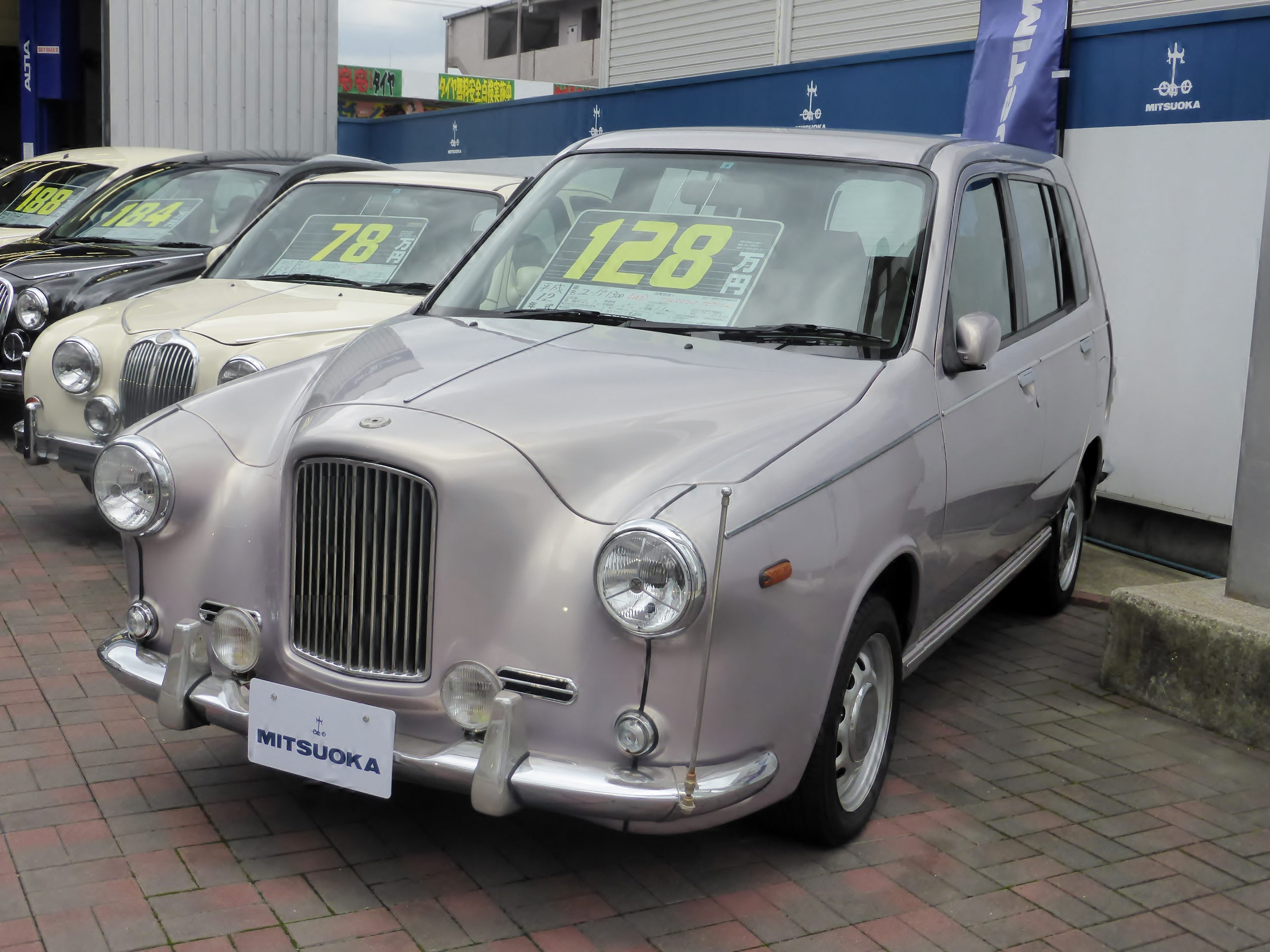
Mitsuoka Yuga

Mitsuoka Yuga Royal (rear view)

== Second generation (Z11; 2002) ==
Second generation
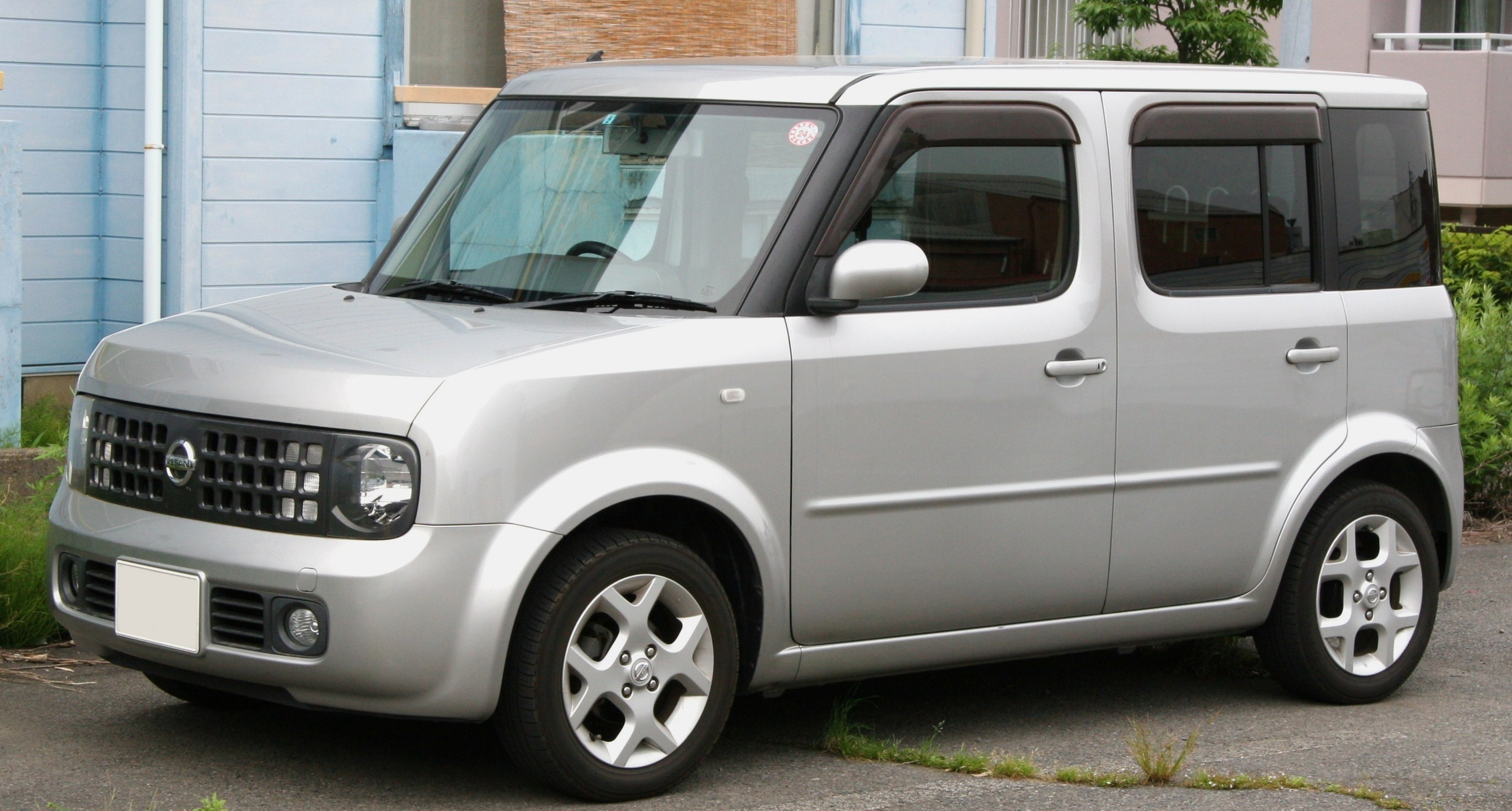

Overview
- Model code: Z11
- Also called: Mitsuoka MPV/M-Box (Malaysia)
- Production: 2002–2008

Body and chassis
- Platform: Nissan B platform
- Related: Nissan Micra/March; Nissan Tiida/Versa

Powertrain
- Engine: 1.4 L CR14DE I4; 1.5 L HR15DE I4
- Transmission: 4-speed E-ATx automatic; JATCO XTRONIC CVT-M6

Dimensions
- Wheelbase: 2,430 mm (95.7 in); Cube³: 2,600 mm (102.4 in)
- Length: 3,720 mm (146.5 in); Cube³: 3,900 mm (153.5 in)
- Width: 1,610 mm (63.4 in)
- Height: 1,625 mm (64.0 in)

The second-generation Cube was released in 2002 with a larger interior than the previous model. Its design was previewed by the Nissan Chappo Concept, which debuted at the 2001 Geneva Motor Show. With a combination of angled and curved surfaces that more closely resembled a cube, it is based on the third-generation Micra/March and powered by a 1.4-litre inline-four engine. The model included the "e4WD" system as an option, which sends power to the rear wheels when the front wheels spin via a small electric motor on the rear underside of the floor. The electrically powered system allows for reduced drivetrain drag in FWD mode. A slightly longer, three-row model, the Cube³ (pronounced "Cube Cubic", model code GZ11) went on sale in September 2003. Until the second and final facelift in January 2007, the Cube³ had a different grille from the regular Cube. This, along with slightly longer rear doors, is the only external difference between the two.

When equipped with a CVT, the steering wheel button controls and the sport wheel button on the dash panel are located next to the hazard flasher switch. In May 2005, the Cube had a light facelift which included the optional upgrade of the new HR-series 1.5 L engine from the Nissan Tiida. The Cube received another exterior update in January 2007.

All Cube models had optional extras including an Ion filter (Air Ioniser) for cleaning the air and Nissan's 'smart key', which allows the driver to enter the car without having to use a key. Other options included a sunroof, 12 different styles of front grille and satellite navigation. Some models also had different styles of bodykits and fender flares. Optional 14 or 15 inch wheels were available, and the Autech versions (Rider, Cube³ and GT models) had chrome styling and special seat covering.

The second-generation Cube was imported and sold in Malaysia by Mitsuoka as the M-Box and later the MPV. Unlike other Mitsuoka models, it had no major differences from the original car, featuring only a different grille and a few other exterior parts. The M-Box and MPV were exclusive to Malaysia.

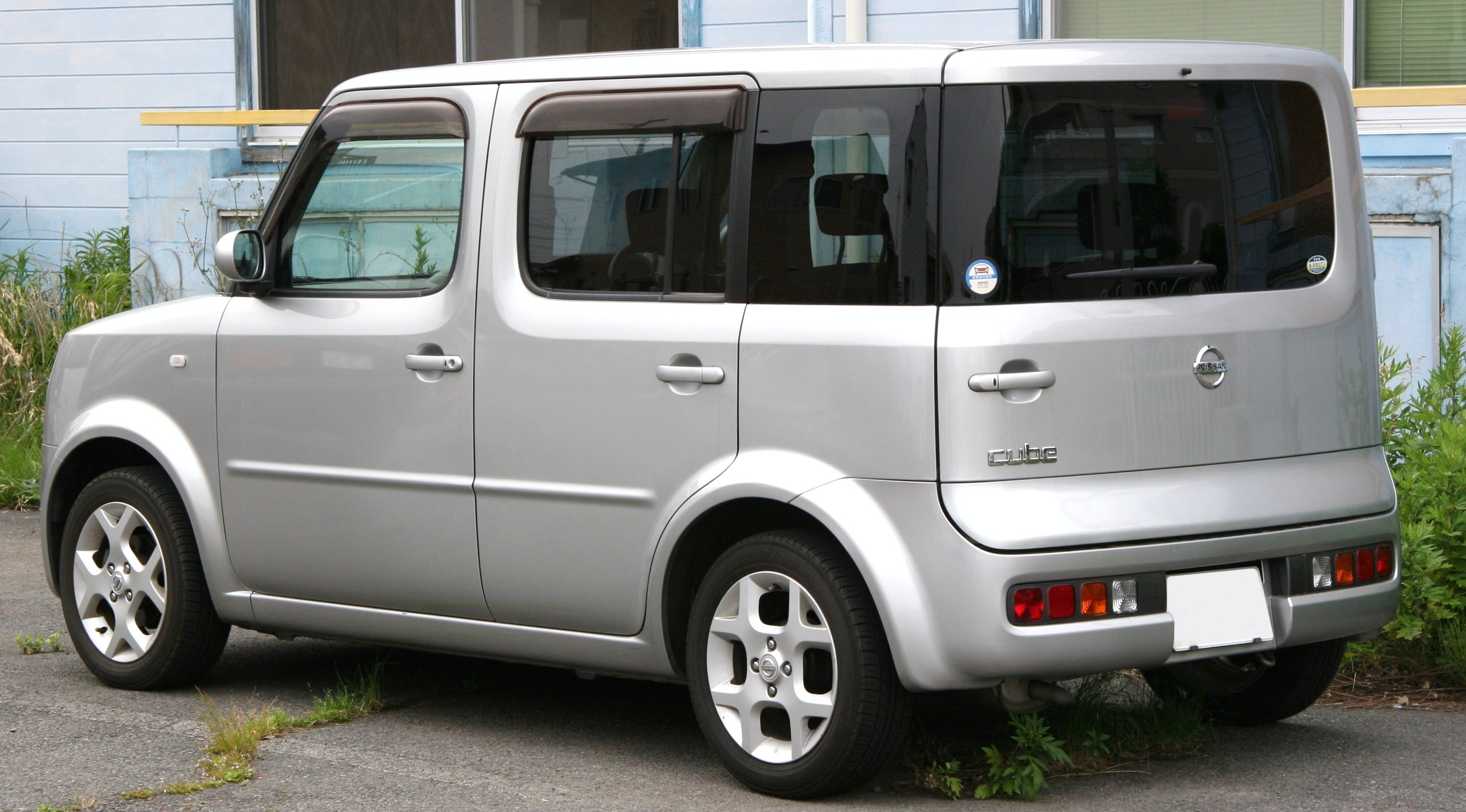
Rear view (pre-facelift)

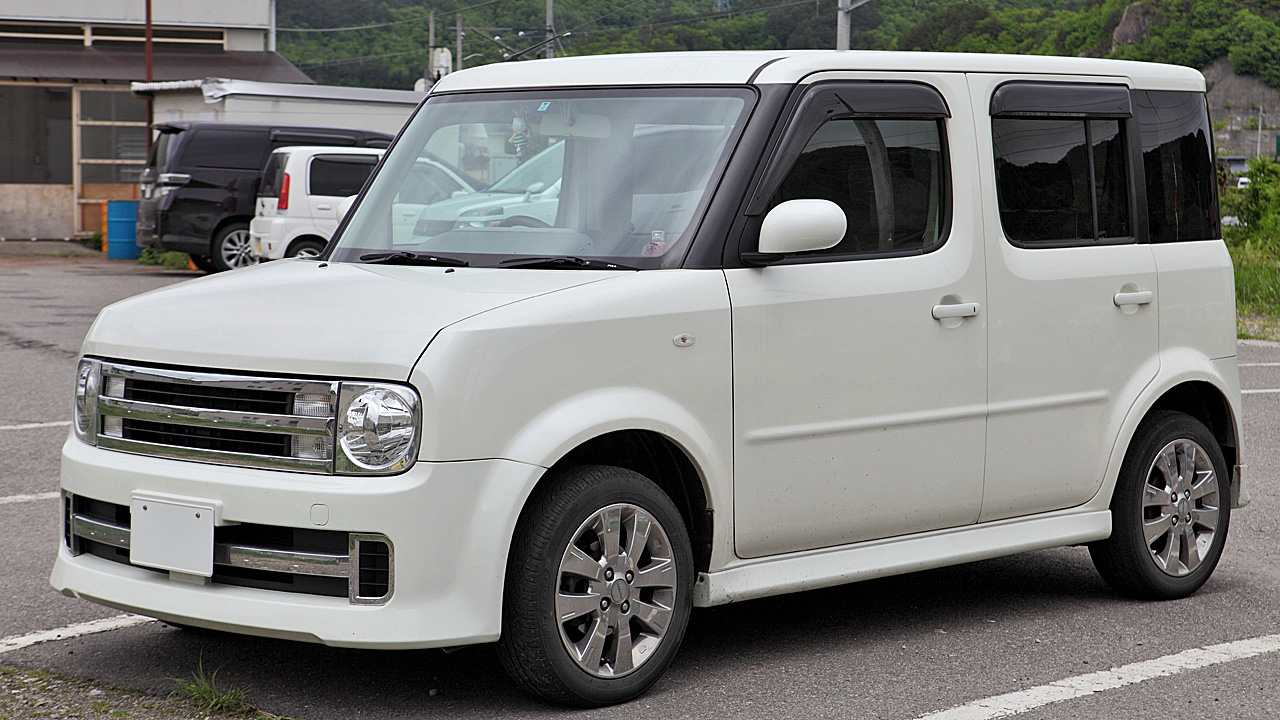
Cube Rider

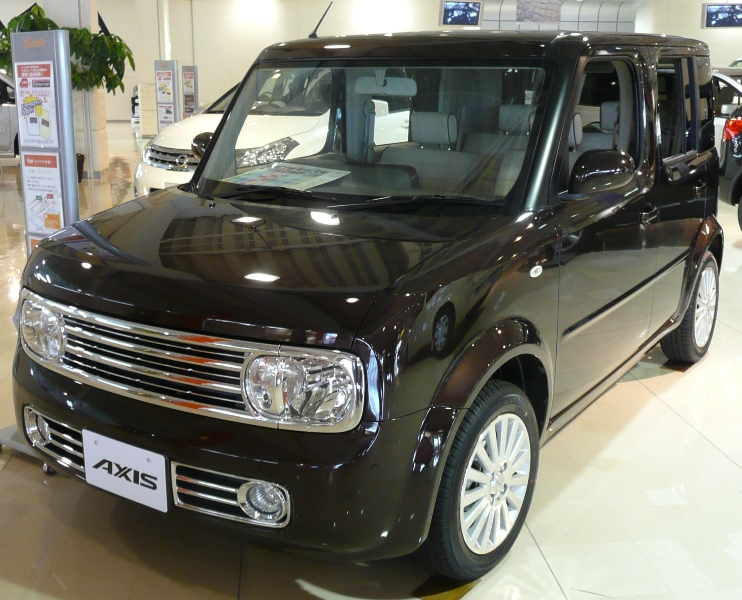
Cube Axis

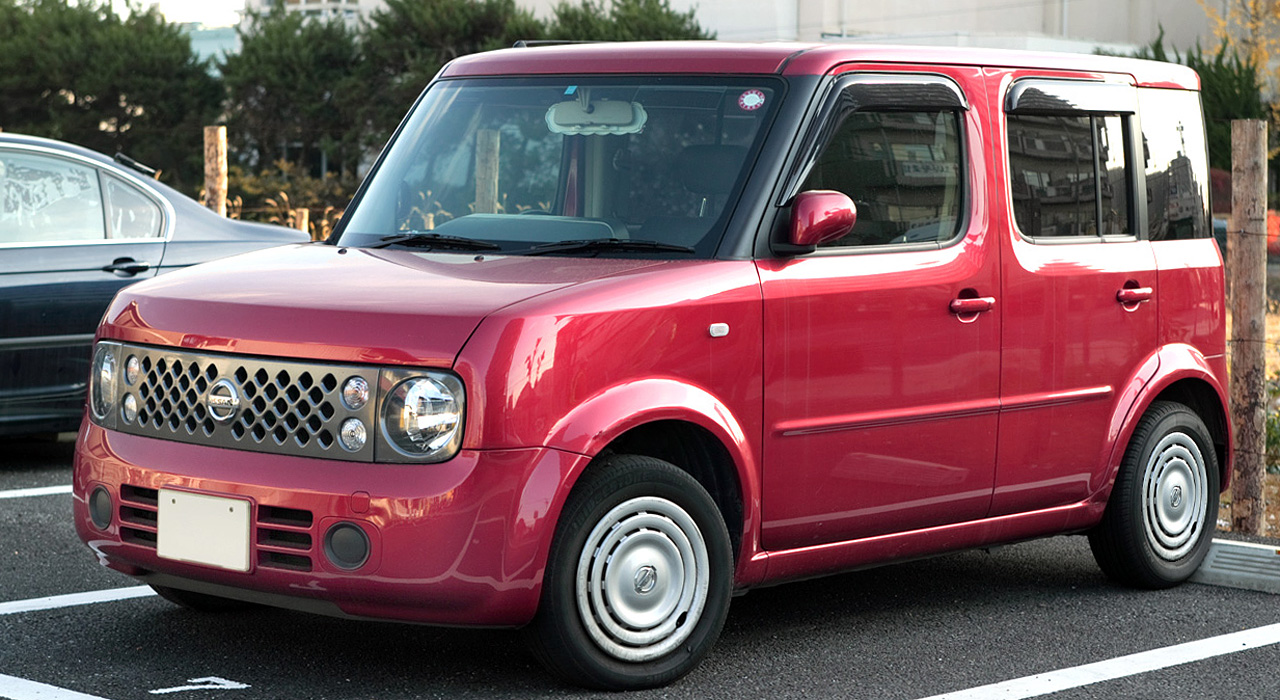
First facelift

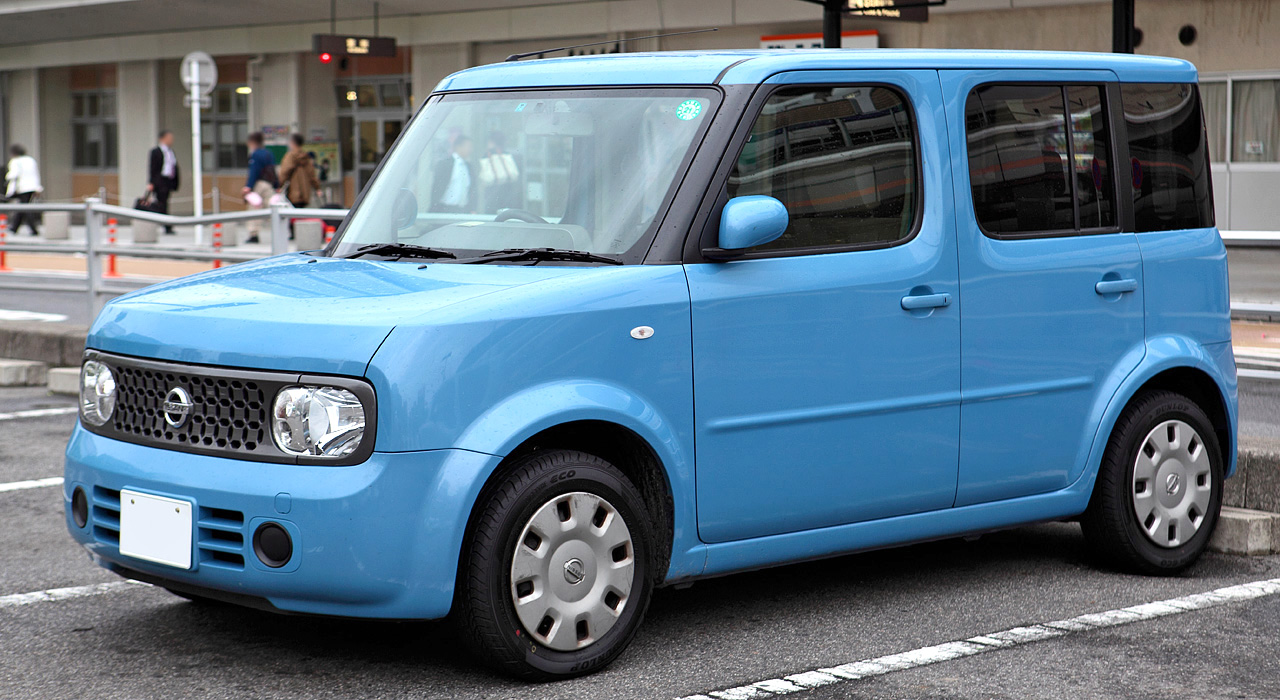
Second facelift

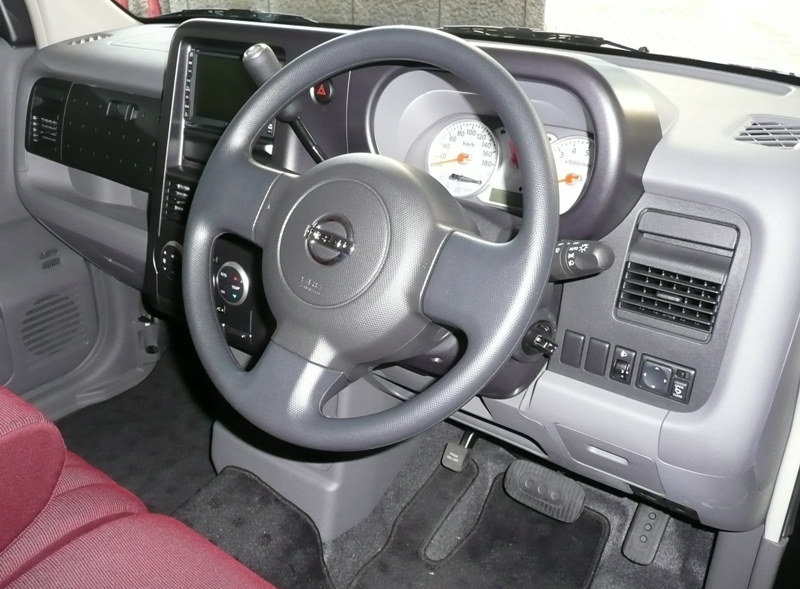
Interior

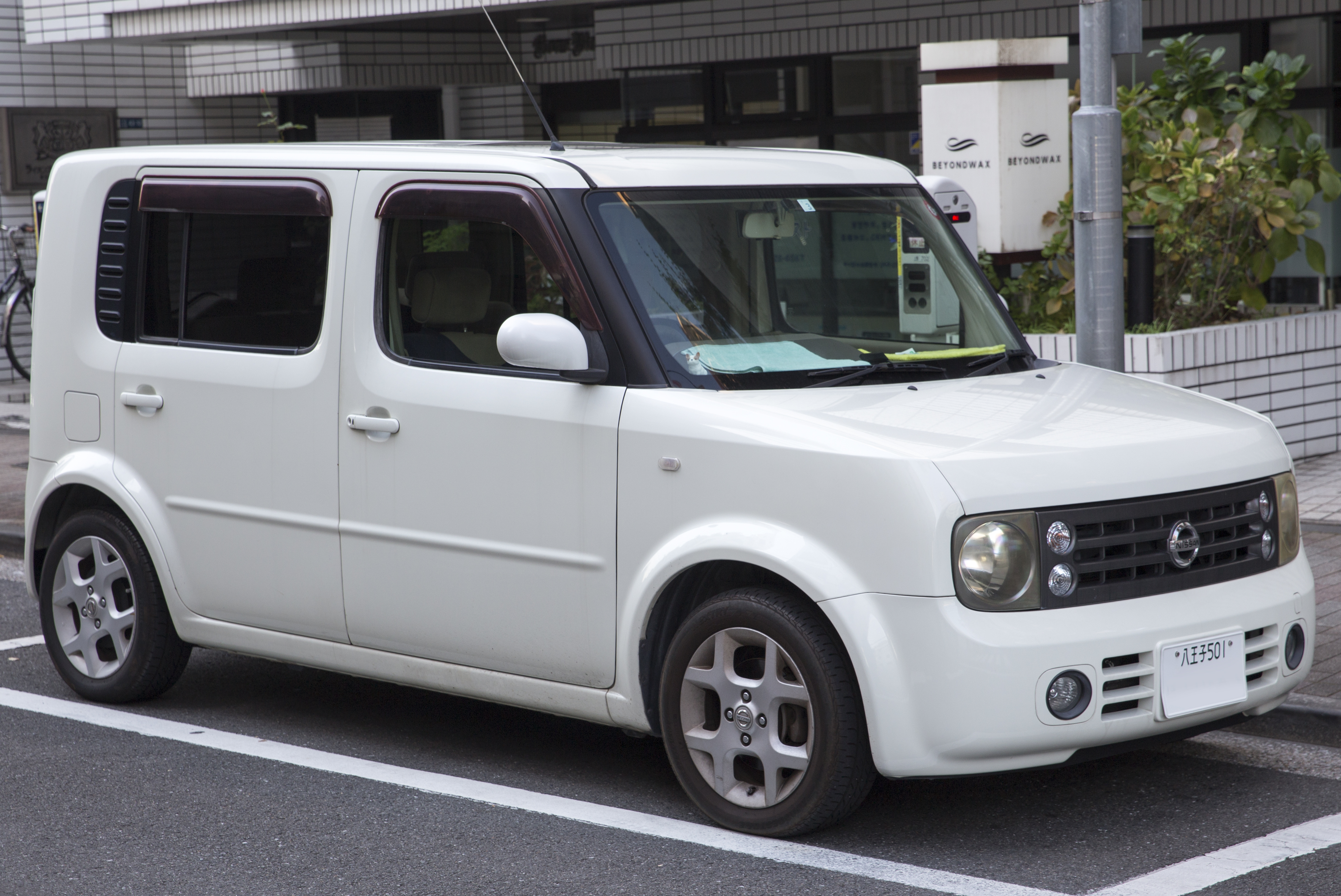
The longer, seven-seater Cube³ (first facelift)

=== EV (2008) ===
In March 2008, Nissan unveiled the Denki Cube Concept (denki means "electric" in Japanese) at the 2008 New York International Auto Show. The concept featured a redesigned front fascia and a lighting motif grille.

The EV-01 and EV-02 prototypes were unveiled in August 2008. They were test vehicles based on the larger Cube Cubic, with an 80 kW motor and lithium-ion batteries. Nissan stated that the production version, to be introduced in 2010, would have a unique bodystyle and would not be based on any existing Nissan model; this became the Nissan Leaf.

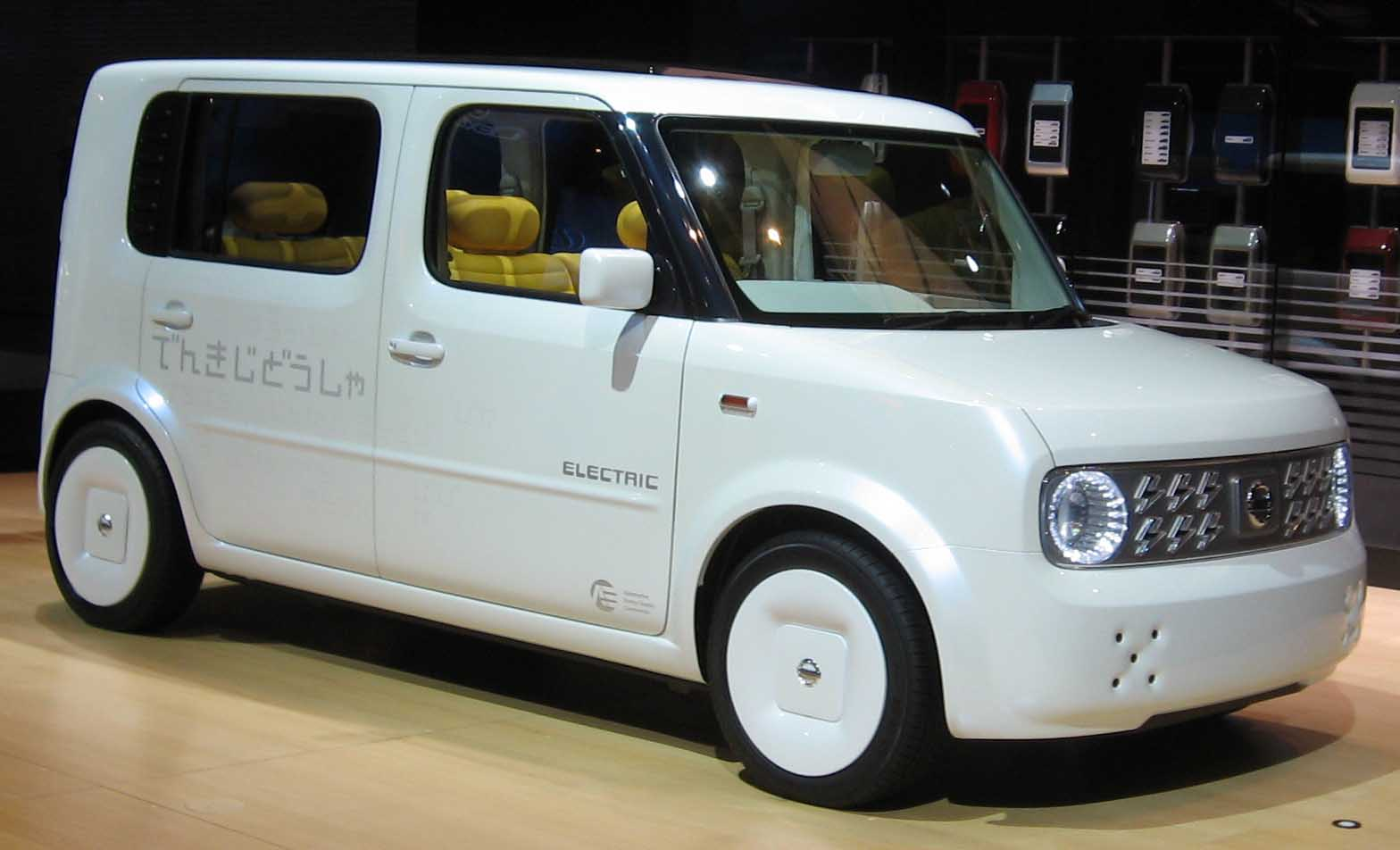
Nissan Denki Cube

Nissan EV-01

== Third generation (Z12; 2008) ==
Third generation
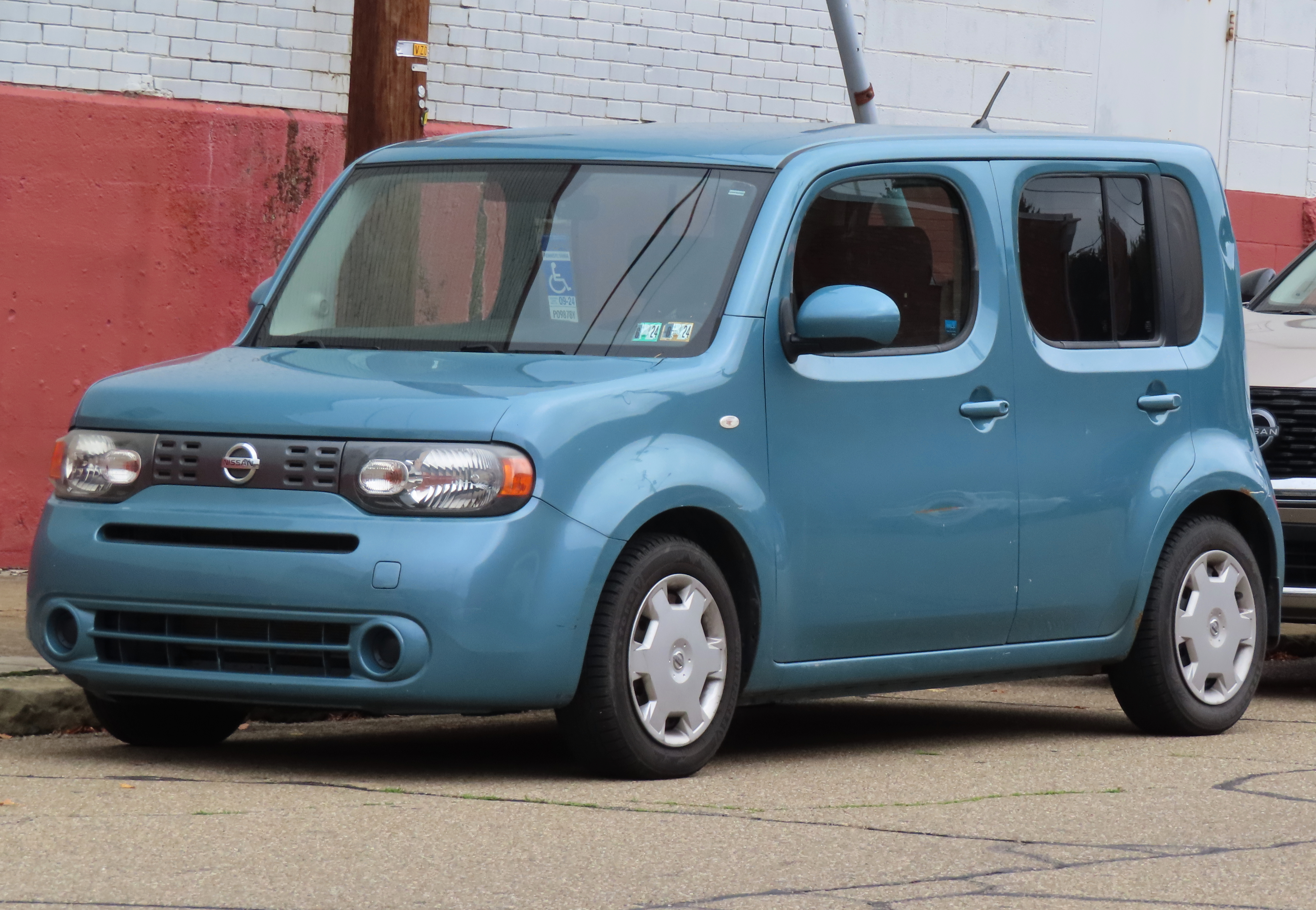

Overview
- Model code: Z12
- Production: 2008–2019
- Model years: 2009–2014 (North America)
- Designer: John Sahs and Alfonso Albaisa; Hirotada Kuwahara (final design); Tadamasa Hayakawa (interior design)

Body and chassis
- Platform: Nissan B platform
- Related: Nissan Tiida/Versa; Nissan Juke

Powertrain
- Engine: 1.5L HR15DE I4 (gasoline); 1.6L HR16DE I4 (gasoline); 1.8L MR18DE I4 (gasoline); 1.5L K9K I4 dCi (diesel)
- Transmission: 5-speed manual; 6-speed manual; CVT

Dimensions
- Wheelbase: 2,530 mm (99.6 in)
- Length: 3,980 mm (156.7 in)
- Width: 1,695 mm (66.7 in)
- Height: 1,680 mm (66.1 in)
- Curb weight: 1,253–1,299 kg (2,762–2,864 lb)

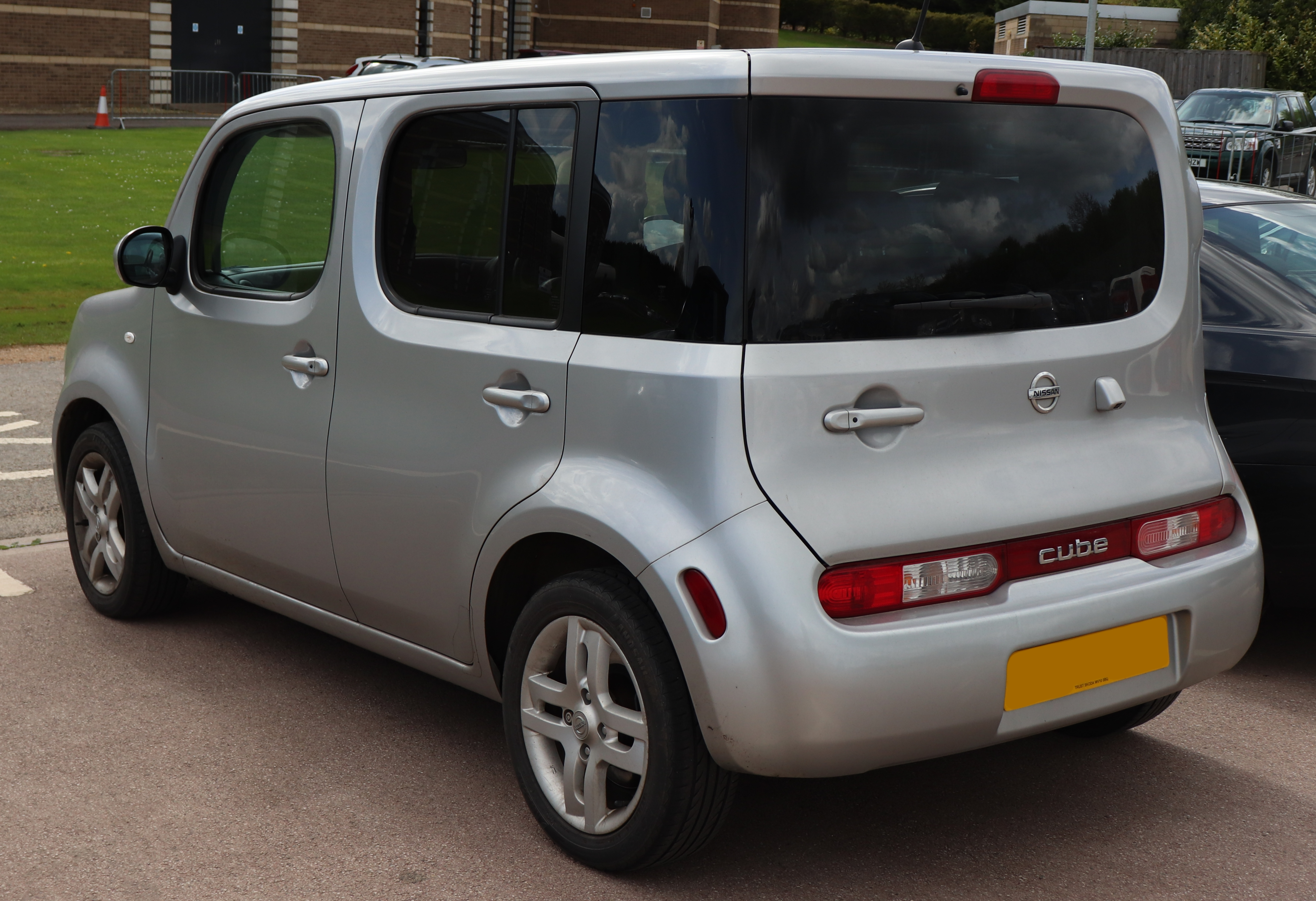
2010 Nissan Cube Kaizen (RHD model; UK)

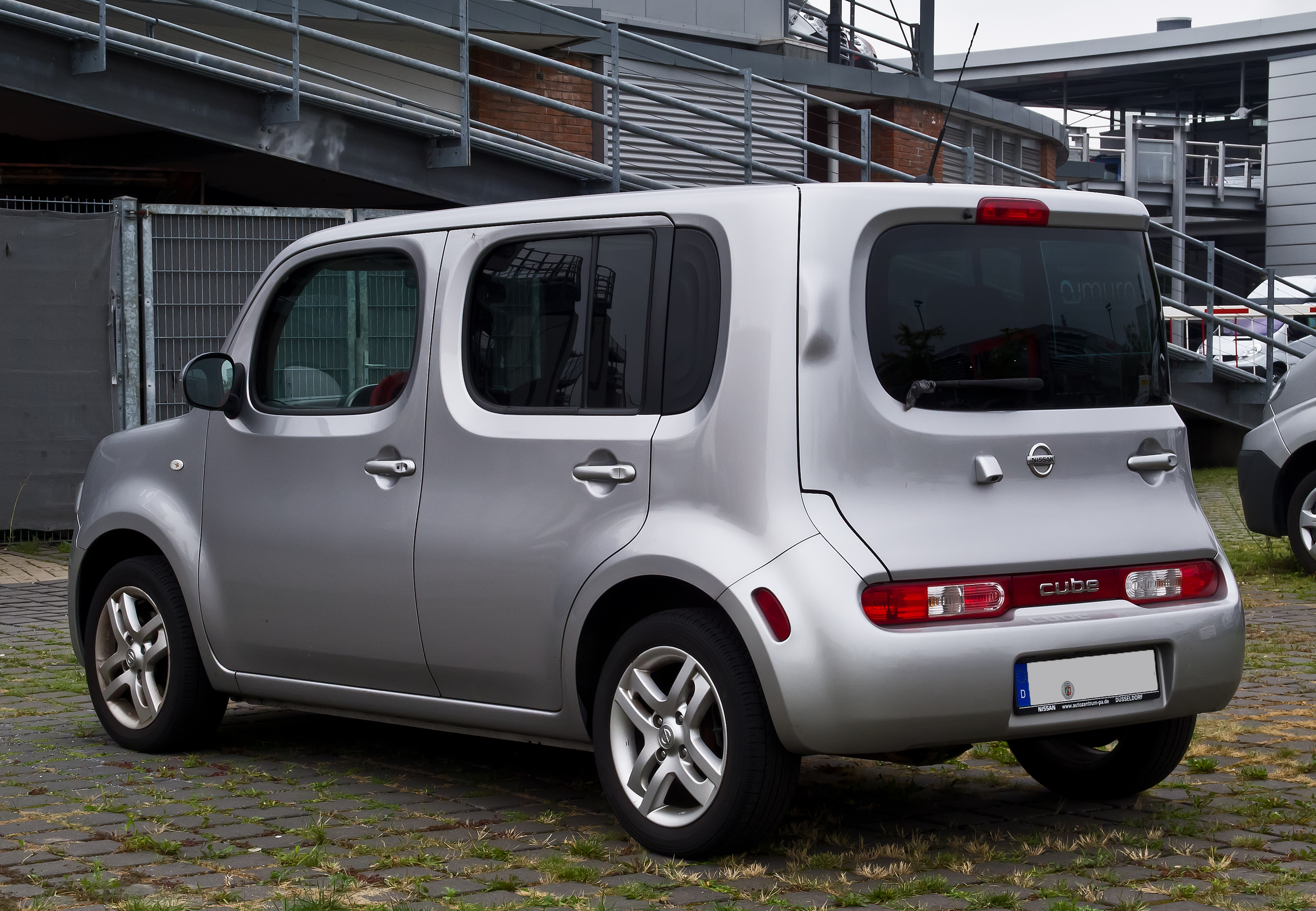
Nissan Cube (LHD model; Germany)

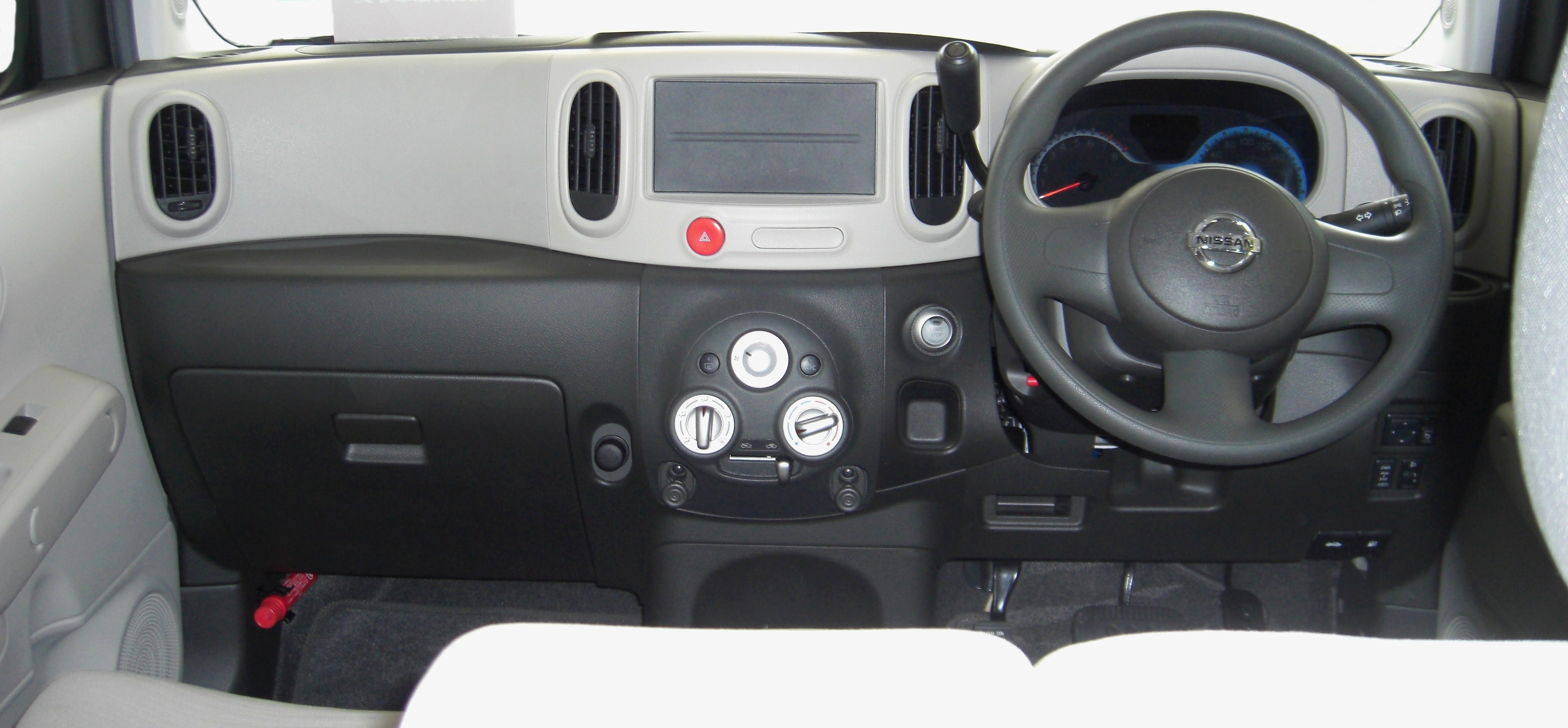
Interior (RHD model)

The third-generation Cube was revealed for the first time at the Los Angeles Auto Show on November 19, 2008. It was the first generation of the Cube to be officially exported beyond Japan, including to the European and North American markets. The Cube went on sale in Japan on November 19, 2008, and the U.S. on May 5, 2009.

The updated model had more rounded and curved styling in the rear bumper area, in the asymmetrical rear window which wraps around to the passenger side, and in the driver and front-passenger windows. The tailgate is side-hinged to swing open like a door, rather than upward like a hatch. The hatch hinge is on the right side for countries with left-hand traffic, such as Japan and the UK, and on the left side for right-hand traffic markets such as North America.

Seating capacity remained at five. According to Nissan designers, the interior is inspired by the 'enveloping curves of a jacuzzi to promote a comfortable and social atmosphere.' Design cues included a water-ripple motif that appeared in the headliner and is repeated in details like the speaker covers and cup holders. Nissan developed an extended line of accessories for the Cube to encourage personalization. These included multicolour appliqués that could be placed around air vents and window switches, utility hooks and elastic bands in different colours, variable colour LED accent lighting for the footwell and cup holders, and a sculptured piece of colour-coordinated shag carpet that sat in a shallow well on the top of the dash.

The third-generation Cube is built on the Renault-Nissan Alliance's front-wheel-drive B platform and powered by a 16-valve 1.5 L HR engine with 109 PS (80 kW; 108 bhp). North American models used the 1.8 L four-cylinder engine of the MR family, which produces 122 hp (91 kW) and 127 lb⋅ft (172 N⋅m) of torque. European models used the HR 1.6 petrol and 1.5 dCi Diesel engines. All of these engines were also used in the Nissan Note and Tiida/Versa. Depending on the engine, the Cube was available with a 5- or 6-speed manual transmission or Nissan's automatic Continuously Variable Transmission. The Cube is capable of averaging 20 km/L (5 L/100 km; 47 mpg_{‑US}) in Japan, and 28 mpg_{‑US} (8.4 L/100 km) city and 30 mpg_{‑US} (7.8 L/100 km) highway with its Xtronic CVT transmission. The e-4WD trim contained an electric rear- wheel- drive motor to assist the front wheels, which are powered by the gasoline engine.

As a result of power shortages in Japan caused by the 2011 Tōhoku earthquake and tsunami, the 2012 Cube made a delayed appearance in the United States in January 2012. The 2012 model had no mechanical or styling changes, but Nissan did introduce a special-edition version, the S Indigo, with a navigation system, rear-view monitor, upgraded audio system, intelligent key and upgraded wheels. New paint colours were available: Pearl White, Brilliant Silver, Gun Metallic, Cayenne Red, and Bali Blue. New equipment features were added to certain trim levels. The price of the base model increased by $240.

In early 2011, Nissan announced the Z12 Cube was to be withdrawn from sale in the UK and the rest of Europe, following weak sales. Nissan cited a poor exchange rate as one of the reasons why the model failed to be competitive.

The Cube was discontinued in the North American market at the end of the 2014 model year, due to poor sales. Production for the Japanese market continued until at least December 2019.

=== Marketing ===
Nissan provided visitors at the 2008 LA Auto Show with a brochure featuring the car using augmented reality technology by Total Immersion. When the brochure was held up to a webcam, 3D models of the vehicle appeared on screen, offering views of the car's exterior and interior in real-time interaction with the brochure.

To promote the first Cube model to arrive in Canada, Nissan Canada ran a contest in early and mid-2009 to give away 50 Nissan Cubes to "creative Canadians". The marketing campaign, called 'hypercube', picked 500 Canadians to compete for 50 Cubes by showing their creative talents. The winners received their Cubes at events held in Toronto, Vancouver, and Montreal.

=== 2010 recall ===
On July 21, 2010, Nissan announced a recall in the United States affecting 46,000 MY 2009 and 2010 Cube vehicles for failing to comply with Federal Motor Vehicle Safety Standard (FMVSS) 301, "Fuel System Integrity", due to excessive fuel leakage after a rear-end collision.

== Awards and recognition ==
- Kelley Blue Book named the Nissan Cube one of its Top 10 Coolest Cars Under $18,000 and also as one of its Top 10 Road Trip Cars.
- Nissan Cube rated a Top Safety Pick by the Insurance Institute for Highway Safety (IIHS).
- Automobile Design of the Year Award
- AAA Top vehicle picks for dog owners
- Nissan Cube won an AutoPacific's Best in Class Vehicle Satisfaction Award.
- Nissan Cube won the Japan Good Design Long Life Design Award of 2018.

== Sales ==
| Year | Japan | US | Canada | Europe |
|---|---|---|---|---|
| 1998 | 107,857 | | | |
| 1999 | 81,796 | | | |
| 2000 | 85,836 | | | |
| 2001 | 75,003 | | | |
| 2002 | 75,215 | | | |
| 2003 | 139,570 | | | |
| 2004 | 138,623 | | | |
| 2005 | 74,818 | | | |
| 2006 | 57,069 | | | |
| 2007 | 51,846 | | | |
| 2008 | 47,295 | | | |
| 2009 | 59,760 | 21,471 | 2,417 | 178 |
| 2010 | 54,406 | 22,968 | 2,864 | 4,359 |
| 2011 | 35,734 | 14,459 | 459 | 1,259 |
| 2012 | 40,680 | 8,354 | 318 | 70 |
| 2013 | 20,995 | 5,461 | 183 | 6 |
| 2014 | 14,331 | 3,784 | 15 | 1 |
| 2015 | 11,012 | 943 | 2 | |
| 2016 | 11,024 | 15 | | |
| 2017 | 7,351 | | | |
| 2018 | 6,590 | | | |
| 2019 | 4,331 | | | |
| 2020 | 254 | | | |

== See also ==
- List of Nissan vehicles
