= Nissan CG engine =

CG engine
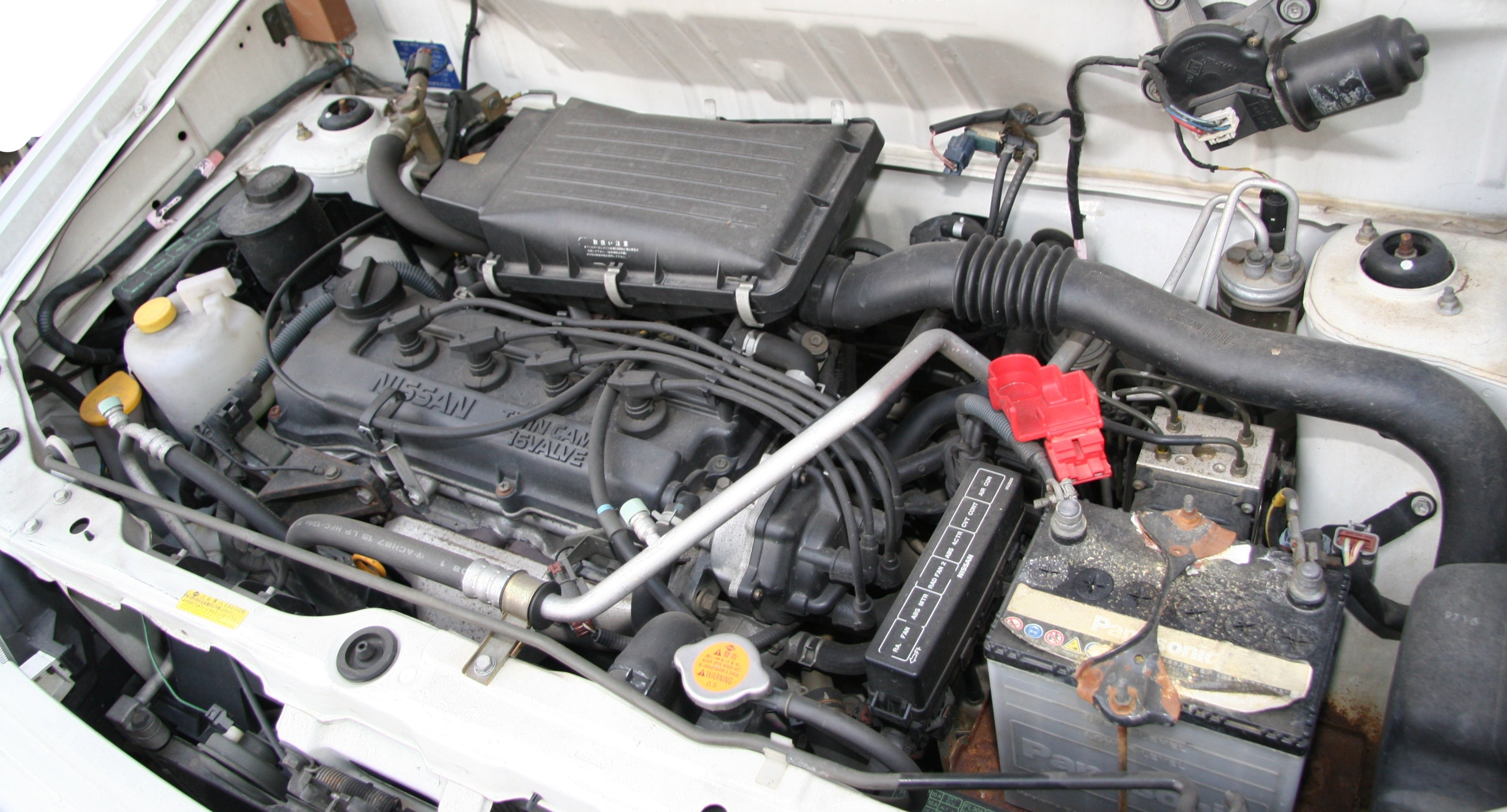

Overview
- Manufacturer: Nissan Motors
- Production: 1992–2002

Layout
- Configuration: Inline-4
- Displacement: 1.0–1.3 L (998–1,348 cc)
- Cylinder bore: 71 mm (2.80 in); 72 mm (2.83 in)
- Piston stroke: 63 mm (2.48 in); 80.5 mm (3.17 in); 82.8 mm (3.26 in)
- Valvetrain: DOHC, 4 valves per cylinder
- Compression ratio: 9.5:1

RPM range
- Max. engine speed: 7300 rpm

Combustion
- Fuel system: Multi-point fuel injection
- Fuel type: Gasoline
- Cooling system: Water-cooled

Output
- Power output: 55–115 PS (40–85 kW)
- Torque output: 79–160 N⋅m (58–118 lb⋅ft)

Chronology
- Predecessor: Nissan MA engine
- Successor: Nissan CR engine

The CG engine is a range of 1.0 to 1.35 litre straight-4 piston engines from Nissan's Aichi Kikai division. It is an aluminum DOHC 16-valve design. The engine was developed for use in the Nissan Micra/March K11 series. All engines featured multi-point fuel injection.

The motor has also been used in many Nissan Forklift models.

The breakdown of the engine code is as follows:

- CG — Clean Green
- 10, 13 or A3 — 1.0, 1.3 or 1.35 Litres.
- D — Double Overhead Cam (DOHC)
- E — Multi-port Fuel Injection

== CG10DE ==
The 1.0 L (998 cc) CG10DE was built from the introduction of the Nissan Micra K11 in January 1992 until it was replaced by the K12 series in 2002.

== CG13DE ==
The 1.3 L (1,275 cc) CG13DE was built from 1992 and continues to power the current (2007) model K11 in Taiwan. In 2000 it was replaced by the CGA3DE in most countries.

== CGA3DE ==
The 1.3 L (1,348 cc) CGA3DE was built between November 1999 and 2002. The engine produced 85 PS (63 kW) at 6000 rpm and 120 N⋅m (89 lb⋅ft) at 4000 rpm. This engine, although considered a 1.4 in the European market, was still marketed as a 1.3 engine in Japan due to the cubic capacity being 1.3 L (1,348 cc).

The x-alpha spec Z10 Nissan Cube was made from May 2001 to September 2002.

In October 2002 the CG engines were replaced with CR engines in Japan.

== Engine reference ==
The CG engine was manufactured in the following versions:

Code	Vehicle	Year	Displacement	Bore x stroke	Max. Power at 6000 rpm	Max. Torque	Features
CG10DE	K11 March/Micra	1992–1999	1.0 L (998 cc)	71 mm × 63 mm (2.80 in × 2.48 in)	55 PS (40 kW; 54 bhp)	79 N⋅m (58 lb⋅ft) at 4000 rpm	MPFI
CG10DE	K11 March/Micra	2000–2003	1.0 L (998 cc)	71 mm × 63 mm (2.80 in × 2.48 in)	60 PS (44 kW; 59 bhp)	80 N⋅m (59 lb⋅ft) at 4000 rpm	MPFI, Direct Ignition
CG13DE	K11 March/Micra; Z10 Nissan Cube	1992–2003; 1998–2000	1.3 L (1,275 cc)	71 mm × 80.5 mm (2.80 in × 3.17 in)	75 PS (55 kW; 74 bhp)	103 N⋅m (76 lb⋅ft) at 4000 rpm	MPFI
CGA3DE	K11 March/Micra; Z10 Nissan Cube	2000–2003	1.3 L (1,348 cc)	72 mm × 82.8 mm (2.83 in × 3.26 in)	82 PS (60 kW; 81 bhp)	108 N⋅m (80 lb⋅ft) at 2800 rpm	MPFI, Direct Ignition

== See also ==
- Nissan Micra
- Nissan Cube
- List of Nissan engines
