= Nissan CR engine =

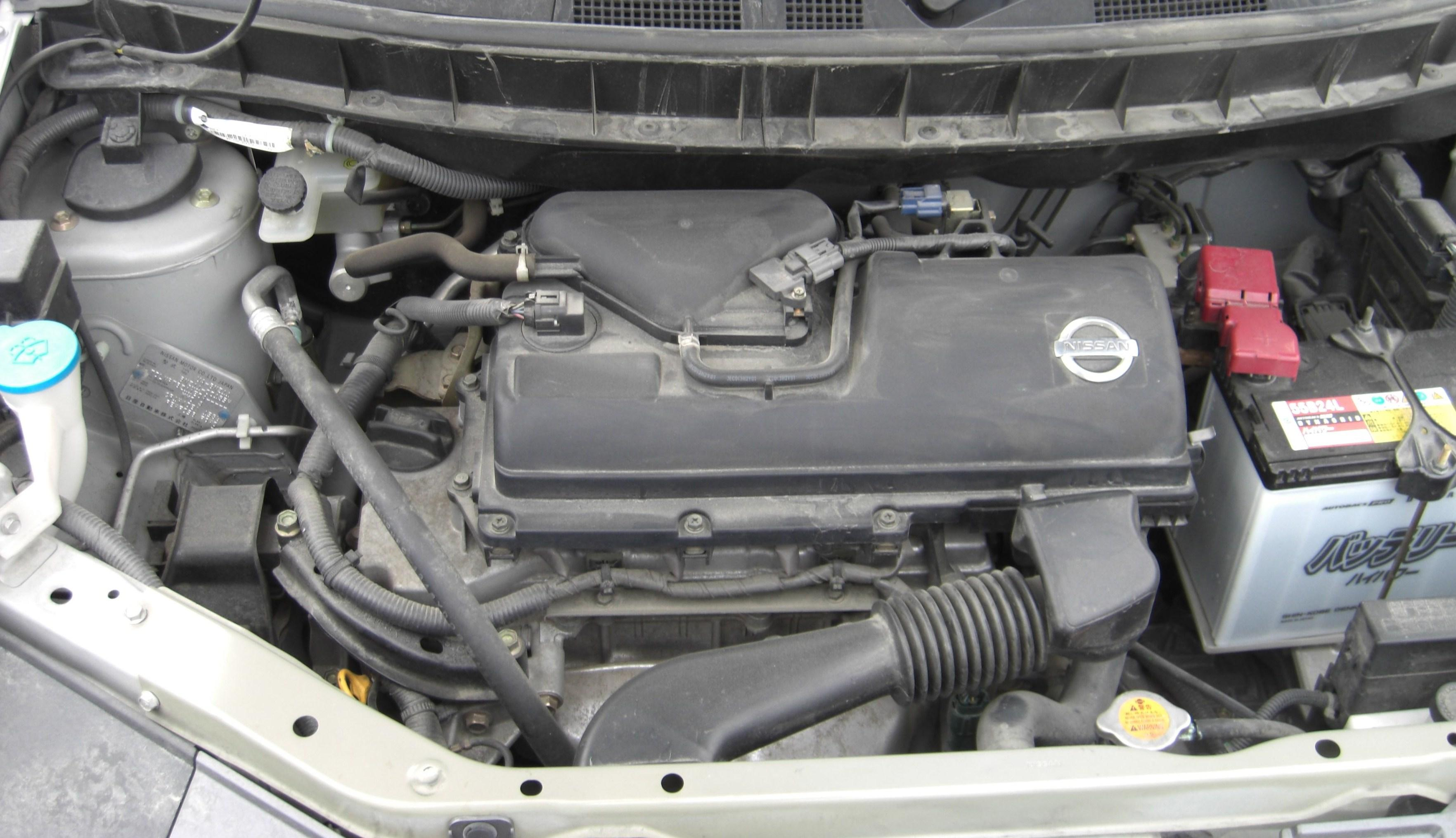

Overview
- Manufacturer: Nissan Motors
- Production: 2002–2013

Layout
- Configuration: Naturally aspirated inline-4
- Displacement: 1.0–1.4 L (997–1,386 cc)
- Cylinder bore: 71 mm (2.80 in); 73 mm (2.87 in)
- Piston stroke: 63 mm (2.48 in); 78.3 mm (3.08 in); 82.8 mm (3.26 in)
- Cylinder block material: Aluminum
- Cylinder head material: Aluminum
- Valvetrain: DOHC
- Compression ratio: 9.8:1-10.1:1

Combustion
- Fuel system: Fuel injection
- Fuel type: Gasoline
- Cooling system: Water-cooled

Output
- Power output: 68–88 PS (50–65 kW; 67–87 hp)
- Torque output: 9.8–14 kg⋅m (96–137 N⋅m; 71–101 lb⋅ft)

Chronology
- Predecessor: Nissan CG engine
- Successor: Nissan HR engine

The Nissan CR engine is a 1.0 L (997 cc), 1.2 L (1,240 cc) or 1.4 L (1,386 cc) straight-4 piston engine from Nissan's Aichi Kikai division in Japan. It is an aluminum DOHC 16-valve design. The CR14DE also features Variable Valve Timing on the inlet camshaft.

It was first used in the Nissan K12 Micra/March in March 2002, then the Z11 Nissan Cube in October 2002 in Japan and the European E11 Nissan Note in March 2006 It replaced the similar Nissan CG engine.

In 2013, the CR engine was discontinued and replaced by the HR engine family.

== Engine reference ==
The CR engine was manufactured in the following versions.

Code	Vehicle	Year	Displacement	Bore x stroke	C.R.	Max. Power @ 5600 rpm	Max. Torque	Features
CR10DE	Nissan March/Micra (K12)	2002–2004	1.0 L (997 cc)	71 mm × 63 mm (2.80 in × 2.48 in)	10.1:1	68 PS (50 kW; 67 hp)	9.8 kg⋅m (96 N⋅m; 71 lb⋅ft) @ 3600 rpm	Coil packs, VVT
CR12DE	Nissan March/Micra (K12); Nissan AD (Y12)	2002–2010; 2006–2013	1.2 L (1,240 cc)	71 mm × 78.3 mm (2.80 in × 3.08 in)	9.8:1	80 PS (59 kW; 79 hp)	12.3 kg⋅m (121 N⋅m; 89 lb⋅ft) @ 4000 rpm	Coil packs, VVT
CR14DE	Nissan March/Micra (K12); Nissan Cube (Z11) / Nissan Note (E11; Europe)	2002–2010; 2002–2008; 2006–2013	1.4 L (1,386 cc)	73 mm × 82.8 mm (2.87 in × 3.26 in)	9.8:1	88 PS (65 kW; 87 hp)	14 kg⋅m (137 N⋅m; 101 lb⋅ft) @ 3200 rpm	Coil packs, VVT

== See also ==
- Nissan Micra
- Nissan Cube
- Nissan Note
- Nissan AD
- List of Nissan engines
